= List of inactive United States Navy aircraft squadrons =

Most of the United States Navy aircraft squadrons established since the Navy designated its first aircraft squadrons in 1919 no longer exist, having been "disestablished". Another 40 or so have been "deactivated", currently existing only "on paper" in an inactive status. These disestablished and/or deactivated squadrons are sometimes incorrectly referred to as decommissioned squadrons, but the U.S. Navy does not "commission" or "decommission" aircraft squadrons. Until 1998, squadrons were "established", "disestablished", and sometimes "re-designated"; since 1998, squadrons are "established", "deactivated", and sometimes "reactivated" and/or "redesignated". It has never been correct to refer to U.S. Navy aircraft squadrons as being commissioned and decommissioned, ships are commissioned and decommissioned, U.S. Navy aircraft squadrons are not.

Under the system in use until 1998, a squadron's history and lineage began when it was established and ended when it was disestablished. During the course of its existence (between establishment and disestablishment) a squadron could be redesignated multiple times. The Navy's oldest currently active aircraft squadron is VFA-14 "Tophatters". It was established in September 1919 and has carried sixteen different designations (VT-5, VP-1-4, VF-4, VB-3, VS-41, VA-14, VF-14, VFA-14 to name just a few) having been redesignated fifteen times. Re-designation might assign a squadron a new number while leaving the basic designation untouched (e.g., VF-151 to VF-192), or it could change the entire designation (e.g., HS-3 to HSC-9). A Squadron retains its lineage regardless of its redesignation(s). When a squadron was disestablished or redesignated its former designation became available to be used for a new squadron or in the redesignation of an existing squadron. Squadrons which share a designation do not also share a lineage as a squadron's lineage follows that squadron regardless of the designation. A squadron which receives the designation of a former squadron might adopt the nickname and/or the insignia and carry on the traditions of the previous squadron, but it could not lay claim to the history or lineage of that previous squadron any more than a new ship commissioned with the name USS Enterprise could claim to be the actual WWII aircraft carrier USS Enterprise.

This system changed in March 1998 with Chief of Naval Operations Instruction (OPNAVINST) 5030.4E. U.S. Navy aircraft squadrons are now no longer disestablished, they are instead "deactivated." A deactivated squadron remains in existence, though only "on paper", awaiting possible future "reactivation". Neither its designation nor any previous designations are available for use by a new squadron. A reactivated squadron would trace its lineage back to the squadron's original establishment date, including its inactive period. Under this new system a squadron can still be redesignated if its function changes necessitating a different designation, for example Helicopter Antisubmarine Squadron EIGHT (HS-8) was redesignated as a Sea Combat Squadron; Helicopter Sea Combat Squadron EIGHT (HSC-8)

The current update of OPNAVINST 3050.4 contains a list of all currently active and deactivated U.S. Navy aircraft squadrons.

The tables in this article list disestablished and deactivated squadrons but also listed will be the former no longer used designations of squadrons which are still active under their current designation.

== Squadrons unique to WWII and prior ==
The squadron types in this section existed only prior to or through WWII. Squadron types which existed prior to or during WWII and which continued to exist after the war are detailed in the sections which follow along with any squadron types which existed only after WWII.

=== WWII and pre-war Aircraft Carrier Squadrons ===
Aircraft squadrons operating from the Navy's first Aircraft Carriers prior to WWII were assigned to that aircraft carrier and were organizationally grouped into that carrier's "air group". On the day that Pearl Harbor was attacked the Navy had seven aircraft carriers each with its own carrier air group. Each carrier air group was composed of four squadrons; one Fighting (VF), one Bombing (VB), one Scouting (VS) and one Torpedo (VT) squadron with the exception of the air group aboard USS Ranger. Because of its smaller size, USS Ranger unlike other the fleet carriers of the time had no room for torpedo storage and so she had no Torpedo Squadron. Instead of the standard air group she embarked one Fighting, one Bombing and two Scouting squadrons.

This four squadron air group aboard Fleet Carriers was the standard through the war, however by 1945 there had been a shift towards more fighters and fewer dive bombers per air group. The Scouting (VS) squadron of the air group was a second dive bombing squadron. The VB and the VS squadrons entered the war flying the Douglas SBD Dauntless dive bomber. The designation SBD designated "S-Scout" "B-Bomber" "D-Douglass" with the VS squadron focused on scouting with a secondary bombing role and the VB squadron as the primary bombing squadron. Beginning in 1943 VS squadrons began to disappear and by early 1945 VS squadrons had been replaced in carrier air groups by a "Bombing Fighting" (VBF) squadron flying either the Vought F4U Corsair or the Grumman F6F Hellcat as a second fighting squadron because by that time in the war the Japanese Navy had been virtually defeated at sea and the need for dive bombers for sinking Japanese warships was outstripped by the need for fighters capable of establishing air superiority and attacking ground targets as the Navy assaulted Japanese held islands in its advance across the Pacific. The F4Us and the F6Fs of the Fighting (VF) and Bombing Fighting (VBF) squadrons established air superiority and participated in amphibious assaults ashore with the air group's VB squadron flying a specialized dive bomber, the Curtiss SB2C Helldiver for both amphibious and counter warship actions when needed, and the VT squadron flying the Grumman TBF Avenger which could be used in the Torpedo bomber role against warships or glide bomber and horizontal bomber roles for amphibious operations.

In addition to the Carrier Air Groups (CVG) of four squadrons each aboard the large Fleet Carriers, there were smaller "Light Carrier Air Groups" (CVLG) aboard "light" Independence-class aircraft carriers made up of a single Fighting (VF) squadron and a single Torpedo (VT) squadron. Also it was initially planned that Escort carriers would embark small air groups made up of an "Escort Fighter" (VGF) squadron and an "Escort Scouting" (VGS) squadron but those designations were used only during 1942 and 1943 after which the VGF squadrons were redesignated to "Fighting" (VF) squadrons and the VGS squadrons were redesignated "Composite" (VC) squadrons. VC squadrons were single squadrons composed of both fighter and Grumman TBF Avenger torpedo/glide bomber/horizontal bombers which served as the air group aboard most of the war's escort carriers. The largest of the escort carriers were paired with "Escort Carrier Air Groups" (CVEG) which were structured the same as the CVLGs with a VF and a VT squadron each.

==== (VF) Fighting Squadrons ====
Fighting Squadrons operated from Fleet Carriers during WWII initially as squadrons of the seven "Ship Named" Carrier Air Groups, then as squadrons of numbered Carrier Air Groups (CVG). They also operated from Light Carriers and Escort Carriers (larger escort carriers only)

==== (VB) Bombing Squadrons ====
Bombing Squadrons operated from Fleet Carriers during WWII initially as squadrons of the seven "Ship Named" Carrier Air Groups, then as squadrons of numbered Carrier Air Groups (CVG).

==== (VS) Scouting Squadrons ====
Scouting Squadrons operated from Fleet Carriers during WWII initially as squadrons of the seven "Ship Named" Carrier Air Groups, then as squadrons of numbered Carrier Air Groups (CVG).

VS was used to designate scouting squadrons from 1922 to 1946, although all 26 or so VS squadrons had by the end of 1943 been given other designations (VF, VT, VC or VCS cruiser scouting squadron). All except VS-41/VFA-14 were disestablished by the end of 1949. (From 1950 to 2009, VS was used for Antisubmarine or Sea Control squadrons.)

| Designation | Insignia | Nickname | Aircraft | Establishment and Redesignation | Disestablished as | Disestablished Date | Notes |
Squadrons in operation before the U.S. Navy began aircraft carrier operations (Note: The Navy's aircraft squadron designation system came into being in the early 1920s. Prior to that time Navy aircraft were assigned to air stations but to fully utilize aviation's potential it was necessary to extend its capabilities to operate with the fleet through the organization of squadrons. Squadrons were numbered according to ship squadron numbers and were designated according to the use of the squadron's aircraft such as "Scouting" or "Patrol" or "Spotting"; however, the official use of abbreviated designations such as VS, VP or VO had not yet been implemented.)
| VS-1 | | | | Establishment and Disestablishment unknown | | | Navy Directory dated 1 Jan 1922 lists the squadrons and notes that it and VS-2 were combined in Dec 1921 to form one squadron |
| VS-2 | | | | Establishment and Disestablishment unknown | | | Navy Directory dated 1 Jan 1922 lists the squadrons and notes that it and VS-2 were combined in Dec 1921 to form one squadron |
1 July 1922 to 1 July 1927 (Note: Naval Aviation Organization for FY 1923 issued on 17 June 1922 and implemented on 1 July 1922 changed the numbering of squadrons from according to ship squadron number to serially within each class and listed the squadrons by abbreviated designation (VF, VO, VS, VT) for the first time. USS Langley (CV 1) was commissioned on 20 March 1922.)
| VS-1 | | | | Establishment and Disestablishment unknown | | | Naval Aviation Organization for Fiscal Year 1923 issued on 17 June 1922 and effective 1 July 1922 lists the squadron. It may be the combined VS-1 and VS-2 listed in the Navy Directory dated 1 Jan 1922 |
1 July 1927 to 1 July 1937: Suffix letters were added to squadron designations which denoted to which fleet squadrons were assigned: B-Battle Fleet, S-Scouting Fleet, A-Asiatic Fleet or "D" followed by a Naval District number for those squadrons assigned to Naval Districts. (Note: Squadrons were redesignated as they were reassigned between fleets. Squadrons were assigned variously to the Aircraft Carriers USS Langley (CV 1), USS Lexington (CV 2), USS Saratoga (CV 3) and USS Ranger (CV 4) as needed to continue the development of ship based aircraft operations and tactics.)
| VS-1B (first use) | | | | VS-1B(1st): May 1928 – 1930; VS-1S: 1930–1931; VS-1B(2nd): 1931-1 Jul 1937; VS-41(1st): 1 Jul 1937-15 Mar 1941; VF-42(1st): 15 Mar 1941 – 22 Jun 1942 | VF-42 (1st) | 22 June 1942 | |
| VS-1S | | | | VS-1B: May 1928 – 1930; VS-1S: 1930-1931; VS-1B: 1931-1 Jul 1937; VS-41(1st): 1 Jul 1937-15 Mar 1941; VF-42(1st): 15 Mar 1941 – 22 Jun 1942 | VF-42 (1st) | 22 June 1942 | |
| VS-1B (second use) | | | | VS-1B(1st): May 1928 – 1930; VS-1S: 1930–1931; VS-1B(2nd): 1931-1 Jul 1937; VS-41(1st): 1 Jul 1937-15 Mar 1941; VF-42(1st): 15 Mar 1941 – 22 Jun 1942 | VF-42 (1st) | 22 June 1942 | |
| VS-1D7 | | | OS2U | 12 March 1942 | | | |
| VS-2B | | | | VS-2B: 3 Jul 1928 – 1 Jul 1937; VS-3: 1 Jul 1937-1 Mar 1943; VB-4: 1 Mar 1943-15 Jul 1943; VB-5: 15 Jul 1943-15 Nov 1946; VA-5A: 15 Nov 1946-16 Aug 1948; VA-54(1st): 16 Aug 1948 – 1 Dec 1949 | VA-54 (1st) | 1 December 1949 | |
| VS-3B | | | | Establishment and Disestablishment unknown | | | Squadron was listed in the January 1929 "Fleet Organization" |
| VS-4B | | | | Establishment and Disestablishment unknown | | | Squadron was listed in the January 1929 "Fleet Organization" |
| VS-5S | | | | Establishment and Disestablishment unknown | | | Squadron was listed in the January 1929 "Fleet Organization" |
1 Jul 1937 through 1 Mar 1943: (Note: Squadron suffix letters were discontinued. Squadrons were redesignated to conform with the hull number of the Aircraft Carrier to which they were assigned: CV 2, CV 3, CV 4 and CV 5 (USS Yorktown (CV 5) was commissioned on 30 Sep 1937). USS Langley (CV 1) had ceased operating as an Aircraft Carrier by October 1936 and had been converted to a Seaplane Tender)
Ship Named Air Groups: (Note: On 1 July 1938 existing squadrons were assigned to five newly established "Air Groups" which were established to operate from USS Lexington (CV 2), USS Saratoga (CV 3), USS Ranger (CV 4), USS Yorktown (CV 5) and USS Enterprise (CV 6) (USS Enterprise was commissioned on 12 May 1938). The Air Groups were designated with the Aircraft Carrier's name (Lexington Air Group, Saratoga Air Group etc...) and the squadrons remained designated with the aircraft carrier's hull number (Lexington Air Group: VS-2, Saratoga Air Group: VS-3 etc...). Two new VS squadrons were established in 1939 and 1941 to equip two new Air Groups which were established in 1939 and 1941 to operate with USS Wasp (CV 7) and USS Hornet (CV 8) which were commissioned in 1940 and 1941 respectively)
| VS-2 | | | | Establishment and disestablishment unknown | | | listed in the Status of Naval Aircraft for July 1937. assigned to USS Lexington (CV 2) |
| VS-3 | | | | established as VS-2B: 3 July 1928 redesignated as VS-3: 1 Jul 1937 redesignated VB-4: 1 Mar 1943 redesignated VB-5: 15 July 1943 redesignated as VA-5A: 15 Nov 1946 redesignated as VA-54: 16 Aug 1948 | VA-54 1 December 1949 | | assigned to USS Saratoga (CV 3) |
| VS-41 | | | | VS-1B(1st): May 1928 – 1930; VS-1S: 1930–1931; VS-1B(2nd): 1931-1 Jul 1937; VS-41: 1 Jul 1937 – 15 Mar 1941; VF-42(1st): 15 Mar 1941 – 22 Jun 1942 | VF-42 (1st) | 22 June 1942 | assigned to USS Ranger (CV 4) as one of two VS squadrons. Redesignated as second VF squadron in the Air Group on 15 March 1941 |
| VS-33 | | | | | | 5 June 1944 | |
| VS-41 (second use) | | Top Hatters | | Air Det Pac Flt: Sep 1919-15 Jun 1920; VT-5(1st): 15 Jun 1920-7 Sep 1921; VP-1-4: 7 Dec 1921-23 Sep 1921; VF-4(1st): 23 Sep 1921-1 Jul 1922; VF-1(1st): 1 Jul 1922-1 Jul 1927; VF-1B(1st): 1 Jul 1927-1 Jul 1934; VB-2B: 1 Jul 1934-1 Jul 1937; VB-3: 1 Jul 1937-1 Jul 1939; VB-4: 1 Jul 1939-15 Mar 1941; VS-41(2nd): 15 Mar 1941 – 1 Mar 1943; VB-41: 1 Mar 1943-4 Aug 1943; VB-4: 4 Aug 1943-15 Nov 1946; VA-1A: 15 Nov 1946-2 Aug 1948; VA-14: 2 Aug 1948-15 Dec 1949; VF-14(2nd): 15 Dec 1949-1 Dec 2001; VFA-14: 1 Dec 2001–present | VFA-14 | Not applicable, still exists | Oldest continuously active aircraft squadron in the U.S. Navy. Ranger's VB squadron was redesignated VS-41(2nd) to replace VS-41(1st) when it was redesignated a VF squadron (VF-42) |
| VS-42 | | | | Establishment and disestablishment unknown | | | listed in 'Status of Naval Aircraft' for July 1937. Assigned to USS Ranger (CV 4) as one of two VS squadrons |
| VS-5 | | | | Establishment and disestablishment unknown | | | listed in the 'Status of Naval Aircraft' for July 1937. assigned to USS Yorktown (CV 5) |
| VS-6 | | | | Establishment and disestablishment unknown | | | listed in the 'Status of Naval Aircraft' for July 1937. assigned to USS Enterprise (CV 6) |

The Lexington Air Group, Yorktown Air Group, Wasp Air Group and Hornet Air Group were disestablished in 1942 after the loss of USS Lexington (CV-2) (Battle of the Coral Sea, May 1942), USS Yorktown (CV-5) (Battle of Midway, June 1942), USS Wasp (CV-7) (September 1942), and USS Hornet (CV-8) (Battle of the Santa Cruz Islands, October 1942). Enterprise Air Group was disestablished in September 1942 while USS Enterprise (CV-6) was undergoing repairs of major damage suffered in August 1942 and Saratoga Air Group and Ranger Air Group were redesignated CVG-3 and CVG-4 in August and September 1943 respectively. Between 1 March 1943 and 15 November 1946 the squadron designation system was changed: numbering squadrons with the hull number of the ship to which it was assigned was stopped and newly established squadrons were numbered serially within each class. (Note: One year earlier, on 1 March 1942, new Numbered Carrier Air Groups were established, the first was CVG-9 (1st) on 1 March 1942. Eighty-eight numbered Air Groups were established during the course of World War II: CVGs were assigned to Essex-class "fleet carriers" and to CV-3, CV-4, and CV-6, which were the three pre-World War II carriers which had not been sunk; CVBGs were assigned to Midway-class "large carriers" toward the end of the war; CVLGs were assigned to Independence-class "light carriers"; and CVEGs were assigned to small "escort carriers". Each group's squadrons were designated with that group's number and each Air Group had one VS squadron assigned (VS-1 belonged to CVG-1 etc...). A squadron reassigned from one group to another was redesignated to conform with the designation of the new group.)

==== (VT) Torpedo Squadrons ====
Torpedo Squadrons operated from From Fleet Carriers during WWII initially as squadrons of the seven "Ship Named" Carrier Air Groups, then as squadrons of numbered Carrier Air Groups (CVG). They also operated from Light Carriers and Escort Carriers (larger escort carriers only).

The VT designation is one of the earliest used by the U.S. Navy. A "Torpedo Plane Squadron" existed as early as 1920 but the use of abbreviated squadron designations (such as "VT") did not come into accepted use until 1922. From 1922 to 1930 it designated "Torpedo & Bombing Plane Squadrons" or "Torpedo and Bombing Squadrons". In 1930 it designated "Torpedo Squadrons" until 1946 when all remaining VT squadrons were redesignated Attack (VA) squadrons and the VT designation disappeared. Between 1927 and 1937 a suffix letter was added after the designation number to identify to which fleet or Naval District the squadron belonged: B for Battle Fleet, S for Scouting Fleet, A for Asiatic Fleet or D followed by a Naval District number for those squadrons assigned to Naval Districts. On 15 November 1946 the squadron designation system underwent a major change; the 17 still existing VT and 14 still existing Bombing (VB) squadrons were redesignated Attack (VA) squadrons and the VT and VB designations were eliminated. The VTN designation was used from 1944 to 1946 to designate "Night Torpedo Squadrons"

On 1 May 1960 the VT designation was resurrected as the designation for training squadrons

Approximately 90 to 100 squadrons carried the VT designation between 1921 and 1946.

| Designation | Insignia | Nickname | Aircraft | Establishment and Redesignation (if applicable) Dates | Disestablished as (or current designation) | Disestablished Date | Notes |
|---|---|---|---|---|---|---|---|
Squadrons in operation prior to the beginning of U.S. Navy Aircraft Carrier operations. Squadrons were numbered according to ship squadron numbers and were designated according to the use of the squadron's aircraft such as "Torpedo" or "Patrol" or "Combat"; however, the official use of abbreviated designations such as VT, VP or VF had not yet been implemented.
| VT-5 (first use) | | Top Hatters | | { Air Det Pac Flt: Sep 1919; VT-5(1st): 15 Jun 1920; VP-1-4: 7 Dec 1921; VF-4(1st): 23 Sep 1921; VF-1: 1 Jul 1922; VF-1B: 1 Jul 1927; VB-2B: 1 Jul 1934; VB-3: 1 Jul 1937; VB-4: 1 Jul 1939; VS-41: 15 Mar 1941; VB-41: 1 Mar 1943; VB-4: 4 Aug 1943; VA-1A: 15 Nov 1946; VA-14: 2 Aug 1948; VF-14(2nd): 15 Dec 1949; VFA-14: 1 Dec 2001 | VFA-14 | Not applicable, still exists | Oldest continuously active aircraft squadron in the U.S. Navy |
1 July 1922 to 1 July 1927: Naval Aviation Organization for FY 1923 issued on 17 June 1922 and implemented on 1 July 1922 changed the numbering of squadrons from according to ship squadron number to serially within each class and listed the squadrons by abbreviated designation (VF, VO, VS, VT) for the first time. USS Langley (CV 1) was commissioned on 20 March 1922, VT-2 operated from USS Langley (CV 1) conducting experimentation in the concept of shipborne aviation.
| VT-1 (first use) | | | T3M | VT-1(1st): 1926; VT-1B(1st): 1 Jul 1927; VT-1S: Jun 1932; VT-1B(2nd): Apr 1933; VB-1B: 1934; VT-2(2nd): 1 Jul 1937 | VT-2 (2nd) | 6 November 1942 | |
| VT-2 (first use) | | Dragons | DT; SC; CS; T2D | VT-2(1st): 1925- VT-2B: 1 Jul 1927; VT-3: 1 Jul 1937; VA-4A: 15 Nov 1946; VA-35(1st): 7 Aug 1948 | VA-35 (1st) | 7 November 1949 | Assigned to "Aircraft Squadrons, Battle Fleet". Operated from USS Langley (CV 1) |
| VT-19D14 | | | DT | VT-19D14: 7 Feb 1924; VT-6D14: 1 Jul 1927; VP-6B: 1 Apr 1931; VP-6F: 17 Jul 1933; VP-6(2nd): 1 Oct 1937; VP-23(1st): 1 Jul 1939; VP-11(3rd): 1 Aug 1941; VPB-11: 1 Oct 1944 | VPB-11 | 20 June 1945 | Assigned to Naval District 14 |
1 July 1927 to 1 July 1937: Suffix letters were added to squadron designations which denoted to which fleet squadrons were assigned: B-Battle Fleet, S-Scouting Fleet, A-Asiatic Fleet or "D" followed by a Naval District number for those squadrons assigned to Naval Districts. Squadrons were redesignated as they were reassigned between fleets.
| VT-1B (first use) | | | T3M; T4M | VT-1(1st): 1926; VT-1B(1st): 1 Jul 1927; VT-1S: Jun 1932; VT-1B(2nd): Apr 1933; VB-1B: 1934 VT-2(2nd): 1 Jul 1937 | VT-2 (2nd) | 6 November 1942 | |
| VT-1S | | | T4M; BM | VT-1(1st): 1926-1 Jul 1927; VT-1B(1st): 1 Jul 1927- Jun 1932; VT-1S: Jun 1932-Apr 1933; VT-1B(2nd): Apr 1933–1934; VB-1B: 1934-1 Jul 1937; VT-2(2nd): 1 Jul 1937 – 6 Nov 1942 | VT-2 (2nd) | 6 November 1942 | |
| VT-1B (second use) | | | BM | VT-1(1st): 1926-1 Jul 1927; VT-1B(1st): 1 Jul 1927- Jun 1932; VT-1S: Jun 1932-Apr 1933; VT-1B(2nd): Apr 1933–1934; VB-1B: 1934-1 Jul 1937; VT-2(2nd): 1 Jul 1937 – 6 Nov 1942 | VT-2 (2nd) | 6 November 1942 | |
| VT-2B | (1928) | Dragons | T2D; T3M; TB; T4M, TG | VT-2(1st): 1925-1 Jul 1927; VT-2B: 1 Jul 1927 – 1 Jul 1937; VT-3: 1 Jul 1937-15 Nov 1946; VA-4A: 15 Nov 1946-7 Aug 1948; VA-35(1st): 7 Aug 1948 – 7 Nov 1949 | VA-35 (1st) | 7 November 1949 | Assigned to "Aircraft Squadrons, Battle Fleet" until 9 Apr 1927 when it was assigned to Saratoga (CV 3) air group |
| VT-3D15 | | | T3M | DANAS Vol II, App 7 VT-3D15: 12 Jul 1928 – 21 Jan 1931; VP-3S: 21 Jan 1931-17 Jul 1933; VP-3F: 1 Jul 1933-1 Oct 1937; VP-3(1st): 1 Oct 1937-1 Jul 1939; VP-32(1st): 1 Jul 1939-1 Jul 1941; VP-52(2nd): 1 Jul 1941-1 Oct 1944; VPB-52: 1 Oct 1944 – 7 Apr 1945 | VPB-52 | 7 April 1945 | Assigned to Naval District 15 |
| VT-6D14 | | | SC; T3M | DANAS Vol II, App 7 VT-19D14: 7 Feb 1924-1 Jul 1927; VT-6D14: 1 Jul 1927 – 1 Apr 1931; VP-6B: 1 Apr 1931-17 Jul 1933; VP-6F: 17 Jul 1933-1 Oct 1937; VP-6(2nd): 1 Oct 1937-1 Jul 1939; VP-23(1st): 1 Jul 1939-1 Aug 1941; VP-11(3rd): 1 Aug 1941-1 Oct 1944; VPB-11: 1 Oct 1944 – 20 Jun 1945 | VPB-11 | 20 June 1945 | Assigned to Naval District 14 |
| VT-7B | | | TBD | VT-7B: Jun 1937-1 Jul 1937; VT-5(2nd): 1 Jul 1937-Jul 1942 | VT-5 (2nd) | Jul 1942 | Established and redesignated on 1 Jul as Yorktown (CV 5) Air Group's VT squadron. |
| VT-8B | | | TBD | VT-8B: Jun 1937-1 Jul 1937; VT-6(1st): 1 Jul 1937-Feb 1943 | VA-6 (1st) | Jul 1942 | Established and redesignated on 1 Jul as Enterprise (CV 6) Air Group's VT squadron. |
1 Jul 1937 through 1 Mar 1943: Squadron suffix letters were discontinued. Squadrons were redesignated to conform with the hull number of the Aircraft Carrier to which they were assigned: CV 2, CV 3, CV 4 and CV 5 (USS Yorktown (CV-5) was commissioned on 30 Sep 1937). USS Langley (CV 1) had ceased operating as an Aircraft Carrier by October 1936 and had been converted to a seaplane tender
Ship Named Air Groups (Note: On 1 July 1938 existing squadrons were assigned to five newly established "Air Groups" which were established to operate from USS Lexington (CV-2), USS Saratoga (CV-3), USS Ranger (CV-4), USS Yorktown (CV-5) and USS Enterprise (CV-6). The Air Groups were designated with the Aircraft Carrier's name (eg "Lexington Air Group") and the squadrons remained designated with the aircraft carrier's hull number (Lexington Air Group: VT-2,) Two new VT squadrons were established in 1939 and 1941 to equip two new Air Groups which were established in 1939 and 1941 to operate with USS Wasp (CV-7) and USS Hornet (CV-8))
| VT-2 (second use) | | | TBD | VT-1: 1926-1 Jul 1927; VT-1B(1st): 1 Jul 1927- Jun 1932; VT-1S: Jun 1932-Apr 1933; VT-1B(2nd): Apr 1933–1934; VB-1B: 1934-1 Jul 1937; VT-2(2nd): 1 Jul 1937 – 6 Nov 1942 | VT-2 (2nd) | 6 November 1942 | Redesignated VT-2 as Lexington's (CV 2) VT squadron (became Lexington Air Group's VT squadron upon the group's establishment on 1 Jul 1938). Disestablished with the disestablishment Lexington Air Group after USS Lexington was sunk |
| VT-3 | | Dragons | T4M, TG; TBD; TBF, TBM | VT-2(1st): 1925-1 Jul 1927; VT-2B: 1 Jul 1927- 1 Jul 1937; VT-3: 1 Jul 1937 – 15 Nov 1946; VA-4A: 15 Nov 1946-7 Aug 1948; VA-35(1st): 7 Aug 1948 – 7 Nov 1949 | VA-35 (1st) | 7 November 1949 | Redesignated VT-3 as Saratoga's (CV 3) VT squadron (became Saratoga Air Group's VT squadron upon the group's establishment on 1 July 1938). Saratoga Air Group redesignated CVG-3 in Sep 1943, remained as CVG-3's VT squadron. Redesignated after the war with CVG-3's redesignation |
| VT-4 | | | TBD; TBF, TBM | VT-4: 10 Jan 1942 – 15 Nov 1946; VA-2A: 15 Nov 1946-2 Aug 1948; VA-15(1st): 2 Aug 1948 – 1 Jun 1969 | VA-15 (1st) | 1 June 1969 | Established as Ranger (CV-4) Air Group's VT squadron. Ranger Air Group redesignated CVG-4 in Aug 1943, remained as CVG-4's VT squadron. Redesignated after the war with CVG-4's redesignation |
| VT-5 (second use) | | | TBD | VT-7B: Jun 1937-1 Jul 1937; VT-5(2nd): 1 Jul 1937-Jul 1942 | VT-5 (2nd) | Jul 1942 | Redesignated as Yorktown's VT squadron (became Yorktown Air Group's VT squadron upon the group's establishment on 1 Jul 1938). Yorktown Air Group disestablished in June 1942 after it was sunk |
| VT-6(1st) | | | TBD | VT-8B: Jun 1937-1 Jul 1937; VT-6(1st): 1 Jul 1937-Feb 1943 | VA-6 (1st) | Jul 1942 | Redesignated as Enterprise's (CV 6) VT squadron (became Enterprise Air Group's VT squadron upon the group's establishment on 1 Jul 1938). Enterprise Air Group disestablished in September 1942 while USS Enterprise was undergoing major repairs |
| VT-8 (first use) | | | SBN; TBD | VT-8(1st): Sep 1941-Jan 1943 | VT-8(1st) | January 1943 | Hornet (CV 8) Air Group's VT squadron until Hornet Air Group was disestablished in Oct 1942 after the sinking of USS Hornet |
Lexington Air Group, Yorktown Air Group, Wasp Air Group and Hornet Air Group were disestablished in 1942 when USS Lexington, USS Yorktown, USS Wasp and USS Hornet were sunk. Enterprise Air Group was disestablished in Sep 1942 while USS Enterprise was undergoing repairs of major damage suffered in Aug 1942 and Saratoga Air Group and Ranger Air Group were redesignated CVG-3 and CVG-4 in Aug and Sep of 1943 respectively.
1 Mar 1943 to 15 Nov 1946: The squadron designation system was changed to cease numbering squadrons with the hull number of the ship to which it was assigned. (Note: One year earlier, on 1 March 1942 new Numbered Carrier Air Groups were established, the first was CVG-9 on 1 Mar 1942. Eighty eight numbered Air Groups were established during the course of WWII: CVGs were assigned to Essex-class "fleet carriers" and to CV 3, CV 4 and CV 6 which were the three pre-WWII carriers which had not been sunk; CVBGs were assigned to Midway-class "large carriers" toward the end of the war; CVLGs were assigned to Independence-class light carriers; and CVEGs were assigned to small escort carriers. Each group's squadrons were all designated with that group's number and each Air Group had one VT squadron assigned. VT-1 belonged to CVG-1 etc). A squadron reassigned from one group to another was redesignated to conform with the designation of the new group.)
| VT-1 (second use) | | | TBF, TBM | VT-1(2nd): May 1943-Oct 1945 | VT-1 (2nd) | October 1945 | Established with CVG-1 as its VT squadron, disestablished with CVG-1 at the end of the war |
| VT-2 (third use) | | | TBM | VT-2(3rd): 1 Jun 1943 – 9 Nov 1945 | VT-2 (3rd) | 9 November 1945 | Established with CVG-2 as its VT squadron, disestablished with CVG-2 at the end of the war |
| VT-5 (third use) | | Torpcats | TBM | VT-5(3rd): 15 Feb 1943 – 15 Nov 1946; VA-6A: 15 Nov 1946-16 Aug 1948; VA-55(1st): 16 Aug 1948 – 12 Dec 1975 | VA-55 (1st) | 19 December 1975 | Established with CVG-5 as its VT squadron. Redesignated after the war with CVG-5's redesignation |
| VT-7 | | | | | | | |
| VT-8 (second use) | | | TBF | VT-8(2nd): June 1943-Nov 1945 | | 1945 | Established with CVG-8 as its VT squadron, disestablished with CVG-8 at the end of the war |
| VT-11 | | | TBM | VT-11: 10 Oct 1942 – 15 Nov 1946; VA-12A: 15 Nov 1946-15 Jul 1948; VA-115: 15 Jul 1948-30 Sep 1996; VFA-115: 30 Sep 1996–present | VFA-115 | Not applicable, still exists | |
| VT-17 | | | SB2C; AD | VT-17: 1 Jan 1943 – 15 Nov 1946; VA-6B: 15 Nov 1946-27 Jul 1948; VA-65(1st): 27 Jul 1948-1 Jul 1959; VA-25(2nd): 1 Jul 1959-1 Jul 1983; VFA-125: 1 Jul 1983–present | VFA-25 | Not applicable, still exists | |
| VT-18 | | Air Barons | TBM | VT-18: 20 Jul 1943 – 15 Nov 1946; VA-8A: 15 Nov 1946-27 Jul 1948; VA-75(1st): 27 Jul 1948 – 30 Nov 1949 | VA-75 (1st) | 30 November 1949 | |
| VT-19 | | | TBM; AD | VT-19: 15 Aug 1943 – 15 Nov 1946; VA-20A: 15 Nov 1946 – 24 Aug 1948'; VA-195: 24 Aug 1948-15 Apr 1985; VFA-195: 15 Apr 1985–present | VFA-195 | Not applicable, still exists | |
| VT-20 | | | TBM | VT-20: 15 Oct 1943 – 15 Nov 1946; VA-10A: 15 Nov 1946-12 Aug 1948; VA-95(1st): 12 Aug 1948 – 30 Nov 1949 | VA-95 (1st) | 30 November 1949 | |
| VT-41 | | | TBM | VT-41: 26 Mar 1946 – 15 Nov 1946; VA-1E: 15 Nov 1946 – 1 Sep 1948 | VA-1E | 1 September 1948 | |
| VT-42 | | | TBM | VT-42: 19 Jul 1945 – 15 Nov 1946; VA-2E: 15 Nov 1946-1 Sep 1948; VC-22(2nd): 1 Sep 1948-20 Apr 1950 (same sqdn listed in VC section); VS-22(1st): 20 Apr 1950-1 Jun 1956 (same sqdn listed in VS section) | VS-22 (2nd) | 1 June 1956 | |
| VT-58 | | | TBM; XTB2D; AD | VT-58: 19 Mar 1946 – 15 Nov 1946; VA-1L: 15 Nov 1946 – 20 Nov 1948 | VA-1L | 20 November 1948 | |
| VT-74 | | | SBW; TBM; SNJ; Douglas A-1 Skyraider | VT-74: 1 May 1945 – 15 Nov 1946; VA-2B: 15 Nov 1946-1 Sep 1948; VA-25(1st): 1 Sep 1948-1 Jul 1959; VA-65(2nd): 1 Jul 1959 – 31 Mar 1993 | VA-65 (2nd) | 31 March 1993 | |
| VT-75 | | Fish Hawks | SB2C; AD | VT-75: 1 Jun 1945 – 15 Nov 1946; VA-4B: 15 Nov 1946-1 Sep 1948; VA-45(1st): 1 Sep 1948 – 8 Jun 1950 | VA-45 (1st) | 8 June 1950 | |
| VT-81 | | Uninvited | TBM | VT-81: 1 Mar 1944 – 15 Nov 1946; VA-14A: 15 Nov 1946- 2 Aug 1948; VA-135(1st): 2 Aug 1948 – 30 Nov 1949 | VA-135 (1st) | 30 November 1949 | |
| VT-82 | | Devils Diplomats | TBM | VT-82: 1 Apr 1944 – 15 Nov 1946; VA-18A: 15 Nov 1946-11 Aug 1948; VA-175: 11 Aug 1948 – 15 Mar 1958 | VA-175 | 15 March 1958 | |
| VT-98 | | | TBM | VT-98: 28 Aug 1944 – 15 Nov 1946; VA-22A: 15 Nov 1946 – 5 Aug 1947 | VA-22A | 5 August 1947 | |
| VT-153 | | | TBM | VT-153: 26 Mar 1945 – 15 Nov 1946; VA-16A: 15 Nov 1946-15 Jul 1948; VA-155(1st): 15 Jul 1948 – 30 Nov 1949 | VA-155 (1st) | 30 November 1949 | |

==== (VBF) Bombing Fighting Squadrons ====
Bombing Fighting Squadrons operated from From Fleet Carriers during WWII as squadrons of numbered Carrier Air Groups (CVG).

==== (VGF) Escort Fighter Squadrons ====
Escort Fighting Squadrons operated from Escort Carriers during WWII as squadrons of numbered Escort Carrier Air Groups (CEVG).

==== (VGS) Escort Scouting Squadrons ====
Escort Scouting Squadrons operated from Escort Carriers during WWII as squadrons of numbered Escort Carrier Air Groups (CEVG).

==== (VC) Composite Squadrons ====
Composite Squadrons operated from the majority of Escort Carriers during WWII in lieu of numbered Escort Carrier Air Groups (CEVG) which were paired with only the largest Escort Carriers.

A total of about 90 Composite Squadron (VC) squadrons existed between 1 March 1943, when Escort Scouting Squadrons (VGS) based aboard escort carriers (CVE) were redesignated as VC units, and the end of 1945, when they had all been disestablished. VC squadrons flew combinations of fighters, dive bombers, and torpedo bombers.

| Designation | Insignia | Nickname | Aircraft | Establishment/ redesignation | Reestablishment | Disestablished as | Notes |
|---|---|---|---|---|---|---|---|
| VC-1 | | | | VS-201: 5 April 1941; VGS-1: 1 April 1942; VC-1: 1 March 1943 | VOF-1: 15 December 1943; VOC-1: 18 December 1944; VC-1: 1 August 1945 | 1 April 1944; 17 September 1945 | |
| VC-2 | | | | VS-25: 15 February 1943; VC-2: 1 May 1943; VC-25: 15 September 1943; VT-25: 15 December 1943 | VOF-2: 1 March 1944; VOC-2: 13 December 1944; VC-2: 20 August 1945 | 20 September 1945; 13 September 1945 | |
| VC-3 | | | | 26 August 1943 | | 28 October 1945 | |
| VC-4 | | | | 2 September 1943 | | 16 October 1945 | |
| VC-5 | | | | 16 September 1943 | | 1 October 1945 | |
| VC-6 | | | Grumman FM-2 Wildcat Grumman TBM Avenger | VGS-25: 1 January 1943; VC-25: 1 March 1943; VC-6: 1 September 1943 | | 5 October 1945 | |
| VC-7 | | | | VGS-31: 24 February 1943; VC-31: 1 March 1943; VC-7: 1 September 1943 | | 1 October 1945 | |
| VC-8 | | | | 9 September 1943 | | 9 October 1945 | Operated fighter and scouting planes from an escort carrier (CVE) |
| VC-9 | | | | VGS-9: 6 August 1942; VC-9: 1 March 1943 | | 19 September 1945 | |
| VC-10 | | | | 23 September 1943 | | 25 October 1945 | Operated fighter and torpedo planes from USS Gambier Bay (CVE 73) |
| VC-11 | | | | VGS-11: 5 Aug 1942; VC-11: 1 March 1943; VF-21: 16 May 1943 | 30 September 1943 | 5 November 1945; 10 October 1945 | |
| VC-12 | | | | VGS-12: 28 May 1942; VC-12: 1 March 1943; VT-21: 16 May 1943 | 6 October 1943 | 7 August 1945; 7 June 1945 | |
| VC-13 | | Fools in God's Oceans | F4F Wildcat, TBM | VGS-13: 5 August 1942; VC-13: 1 March 1943 | | 24 September 1945 | USS Tripoli (CVE-64), USS Anzio (CVE-57) |
| VC-14 | | | | 12 October 1943 | | 1 October 1945 | |
| VC-15 | | | | 18 October 1943 | | 14 June 1945 | |
| VC-16 | | | | VGS-16: 8 Aug 1942; VC-16: 1 March 1943; VF-33: 15 November 1945 | | 19 November 1945 | |
| VC-17 | | | | VC-17: 1 May 1943; VC-31: 15 September 1943; VT-31: 1 November 1943 | | 20 October 1945 | |
| VC-18 | | | | VGS-18: 15 Oct 1942; VC-18: 1 March 1943; VF-36: 15 August 1943; VF-18: 5 March 1944; VF-7A: 15 Nov 1946; VF-71: 28 Jul 1948 | | VF-71: 31 March 1959 | |
| VC-19 | | | | VGS-23: 1 January 1943; VC-19: 1 March 1943 | | 14 June 1945 | |
| VC-20 | | | | VGS-20: 1 January 1943; VC-20: 1 March 1943 | 24 October 1943 | 15 June 1943; 1 October 1945 | |
| VC-21 | | | | VGS-21: 15 October 1942; VC-21: 1 March 1943 | 30 October 1943 | 16 June 1943; 15 September 1945 | |
| VC-22 | | | | VS-22: 31 December 1942; VC-22: 1 March 1943; VT-22: 15 December 1943 | | 22 August 1945 | |
| VC-23 | | | | VS-23: 16 November 1942; VC-23: 1 March 1943; VT-23: 15 November 1943 | | 19 September 1945 | |
| VC-24 | | | | VS-24: 31 December 1942; VC-24: 1 March 1943; VB-98: 15 December 1943 | | 25 June 1944 | |
| VC-25 | | | FM-2, TBM | VS-25: 15 February 1943; VC-2: 1 March 1943; VC-25: 15 September 1943; VT-25: 15 December 1943 | | 20 September 1945 | |
| VC-26 | | | | VGS-26: 5 May 1942; VC-26: 1 March 1943; VT-26: 15 November 1943 | | 13 November 1945 | |
| VC-27 | | | | 5 November 1943 | | 11 September 1945 | |
| VC-28 | | | | VGS-28: 4 May 1942; VC-28: 1 March 1943; VT-28: 20 January 1944 | | 8 August 1945 | |
| VC-29 | | | | VGS-29: 20 July 1942; VC-29: 1 March 1943; VT-29: 15 December 1943 | | 1 August 1945 | |
| VC-30 | | | | 1 April 1943; VT-30: 15 December 1943 | | 18 August 1945 | |
| VC-34 | | | | VGS-34: 24 Feb 1943; VC-34: 1 Mar 1943; VF-34: 15 Aug 1943 | | VF-34 8 July 1944 | |
| VC-64 | | | | VC-64: 1 Jun 1943; VF-39: 15 Aug 1943 | | VF-39 15 July 1944 | |
| VC-72 | | Ball the Jack | FM-2, TBM | 1944-1945 | | 1945 | |
| VC-91 | | Green Weenies | FM-2, TBM | 11 February 1944 | | 22 September 1945 | November 1944 - February 1945 USS Kitkun Bay (CVE-71); February 1945 - May 1945 USS Savo Island (CVE-78); July 1945 - November 1945 USS Makin Island (CVE-93) |

==== (VFN) Night Fighter Squadrons ====
VFN squadrons were part of Night Carrier Air Groups CVG(N), CVLG(N) or CVEG(N). There were five CVG(N)s, three CVLG(N)s and one CVEG(N). The designation was in use only from 1944 to 1946.

==== (VTN) Night Torpedo Squadrons ====
VTN squadrons were part of Night Carrier Air Groups CVG(N), CVLG(N) or CVEG(N). There were five CVG(N)s, three CVLG(N)s and one CVEG(N). The designation was in use only from 1944 to 1946.

=== WWII and pre-war non-Aircraft Carrier Squadrons ===
The squadrons below operated from ships other than aircraft carriers or from bases ashore

==== (VH) Rescue Squadrons ====
| Squadron Designation | Insignia | Nickname | Last aircraft | Disestablished | Notes |
|---|---|---|---|---|---|
| VH-1 | | | Martin PBM Mariner | April 1946 | Rescue Squadron established on 1 February 1944 |
| VH-2 | | | Martin PBM Mariner | November 1945 | Rescue Squadron established August 1944 |
| VH-3 | | | Martin PBM Mariner | April 1946 | Rescue Squadron established on 1 August 1944 |
| VH-4 | | | Martin PBM Mariner | November 1946 | Rescue Squadron established in September 1944 |
| VH-5 | | | Martin PBM Mariner | June 1946 | Rescue Squadron established in September 1944 |
| VH-6 | | | Martin PBM Mariner | February 1946 | Rescue Squadron established in January 1945 |

==== (VCS) Cruiser Scouting Squadron ====
The VCS designation existed from 1937 to 1945. It designated squadrons which provided float planes to Cruisers to be used for scouting and naval gunfire spotting. The aircraft were launched from a shipboard catapult and landed in the water near the ship to be craned aboard and placed back on the catapult.

==== (VOS) Observation Squadron ====
The VOS designation designated only one squadron which was formed for Operation Overlord. The squadron was formed from detachments of "Cruiser Scouting" (VCS) squadron 7 and existed only from 1 June 1944 to 27 June 1944. It was possibly the shortest lived military squadron.

- VOS-7: Established 1 June 1944, disestablished 27 June 1944.

| Designation | Insignia | Nickname | Aircraft | Lineage | Notes | Disestablished |
|---|---|---|---|---|---|---|
| VOS-7 | | | Spitfire Mk V, Seafire (Note: from RAF and Fleet air arm stocks. Aircraft were pooled and flown as available.) | 1 Jun 1944 – 27 Jun 1944 | Based at RNAS Lee-on-Solent (HMS Daedalus) United Kingdom. Part of 34th Reconnaissance Wing, RAF Second Tactical Air Force, which was a mixed force of USN, RAF, and FAA squadrons flying spotting flights for naval artillery. VOS-7 operated from the invasion of Normandy until the capture of Cherbourg. | 27 June 1944 |

== Antisubmarine and Patrol Squadrons ==
Patrol squadrons were among the first type of squadrons established in the early 1920s. They generally were and remain squadrons of large multi-engine maritime patrol aircraft. Up until the 1950s patrol squadrons flew either seaplane or land based aircraft. During WWII patrol squadrons were at times designated Bombing (VB) squadrons and/or Patrol Bombing (VPB) squadrons. The VP designation remains in use today. Antisubmarine squadrons grew out of modifications to WWII torpedo bombers. They were first established as specialized aircraft carrier based squadrons in 1948 and they existed into the 21st century.

=== (VC)(VS) Air Anti-submarine/Sea Control Squadrons ===
From April 1950 to September 1993 the VS designation designated "Air Antisubmarine" squadron. (Note: 'VS' had been used from 1922 to 1946 to designate "Scouting" squadrons which flew dive bombers in bombing and scouting roles, but there is no relation between those scouting squadrons and these antisubmarine squadrons) In September 1993 the name of the VS designation was changed from "Air Antisubmarine" (VS) squadron" to "Sea Control" (VS) squadron when the S-3A Viking was replaced with the S-3B Viking which was capable of anti-surface warfare as well as anti-submarine warfare. On 31 March 2009 the last VS squadron was deactivated ending the active use of the VS designation. Today it exists only attached to eleven deactivated VS squadrons.

Beginning in 1948 land based squadrons which provided detachments of specialized aircraft to Carrier Air Groups were established and designated "Composite" (VC) squadrons. These specialized functions were: All-Weather/Night Fighter; All Weather Attack; Heavy Attack (Nuclear Bombers); Airborne Early Warning; Anti-Submarine Warfare; and Photographic Reconnaissance. By 1956 all VC squadrons had been redesignated to role descriptive designations.

From September 1948 through May 1949 four squadrons were redesignated and three were established as "Composite" (VC) squadrons VC-21, 22, 23, 24, 25, 31 and 32. These seven squadrons were specialized antisubmarine warfare (ASW) squadrons and they provided detachments of ASW aircraft to Carrier Air Groups. In April 1950 these seven squadrons were all redesignated "Air Antisubmarine" (VS) squadrons.

- VT-41/VA-1E/VC-21(2nd)/VS-21: Established 26 March 1946, deactivated 28 February 2005.

| Designation | Insignia | Nickname | Aircraft | Lineage | Notes | Deactivated (Note: Chief of Naval Operations Instruction (OPNAVINST) 5030.4E dated March 1998 changed the designation system putting it in line with the system used by the USAF and USMC in that since that date U.S. Navy aircraft squadrons are no longer disestablished, they are instead "deactivated." A deactivated squadron remains in existence, though only "on paper", awaiting possible future "reactivation". Neither its designation nor any previous designations are available for use by a new squadron. A reactivated squadron would trace its lineage back to the squadron's original establishment date, including its inactive period) |
|---|---|---|---|---|---|---|
| VT-41 | | | TBM-1, TBM-1C, TBM-3 | VT-41: 26 Mar 1946-15 Nov 1946 | WWII Torpedo squadron of CVEG 41 | |
| VA-1E | | | TBM-1, TBM-1C, TBM-3 | VA-1E: 15 Nov 1946 – 1 Sep 1948 | Post WWII Attack squadron of CVEG-1 (Note: on 15 November 1946 CVEG-41 was redesignated CVEG-1 and its torpedo squadron (VT-41) was redesignated Attack (VA) squadron VA-1E (its fighting squadron (VF-41(2nd)) was redesignated VF-1E) | |
| VC-21(2nd) | | Redtails | TBM-3E | VC-21(2nd): 1 Sep 1948 – 23 Apr 1950 | ASW squadron (Note: Provided detachments of specialized ASW aircraft to Carrier Air Groups) | |
| VS-21 | (Note: (Sep 1993)) | Fighting Redtails | TBM-3E, TBM-3S, AF-2S, AF-2W, S2F-1, S2F-1S/S-2B, S2F-1S1/S-2F, S-2E, S-3A, S-3B | VS-21: 23 Apr 1950-28 Feb 2005 | | 28 February 2005 |

- VT-42/VA-2E/VC-22(2nd)/VS-22(1st): Established 19 July 1945, disestablished 1 June 1956.

| Designation | Insignia | Nickname | Aircraft | Lineage | Notes | Disestablished |
|---|---|---|---|---|---|---|
| VT-42 | | Checkmates | TBM-3E, TBM-3S, TBM-3W | VT-42: 19 Jul 1945-15 Nov 1946 | WWII Torpedo squadron of CVEG 42 | |
| VA-2E | | Checkmates | TBM-3E, TBM-3S, TBM-3W | VA-2E: 15 Nov 1946 – 1 Sep 1948 | Post WWII Attack squadron of CVEG-2 (Note: on 15 November 1946 CVEG-42 was redesignated CVEG-2 and its torpedo squadron (VT-42) was redesignated Attack (VA) squadron VA-2E (its fighting squadron (VF-42(2nd)) was redesignated VF-2E) | |
| VC-22(2nd) | | Checkmates | TBM-3S, TBM-3W, AF-2S, AF-2W | VC-22(2nd): 1 Sep 1948 – 20 Apr 1950 | ASW squadron (Note: Provided detachments of specialized ASW aircraft to Carrier Air Groups) | |
| VS-22(1st) | | Checkmates | AF-2S, AF-2W | VS-22(1st): 20 April 1950 – 1 June 1956 | | 1 June 1956 |

- VA-3E/VC-23(2nd)/VS-23: Established 21 April 1947, disestablished 27 September 1968.

| Designation | Insignia | Nickname | Aircraft | Lineage | Notes | Disestablished |
|---|---|---|---|---|---|---|
| VA-3E | | Black Cats | TBM | VA-3E: 21 Apr 1947 – 1 Sep 1948 | Post WWII Attack squadron of CVEG-3 | |
| VC-23(2nd) | | Black Cats | TBM-3S, TBM-3W | VC-23(2nd): 1 Sep 1948 – 23 Apr 1950' | ASW Squadron (Note: Provided detachments of specialized ASW aircraft to Carrier Air Groups) | |
| VS-23 | | Black Cats | S2F-1/S-2A, S-2E | VS-23: 23 Apr 1950-27 Sep 1968 | | 27 September 1968 |

- VB-17/VA-5B/VA-64(1st)/VC-24(2nd)/VS-24(1st): Established 1 January 1943, disestablished 1 June 1956.

| Designation | Insignia | Nickname | Aircraft | Lineage | Notes | Disestablished |
|---|---|---|---|---|---|---|
| VB-17 | | | SB2C | VB-17: 1 Jan 1943-15 Nov 1946 | WWII Bombing squadron of CVG 17(1st) | |
| VA-5B | | | SB2C, AD | VA-5B: 15 Nov 1946 – 27 Jul 1948 | Post WWII Attack squadron of CVBG-5 | |
| VA-64(1st) | | | AD | VA-64(1st): 27 Jul 1948 – 8 Apr 1949 | 1st Attack squadron of CVG-6(2nd) | |
| VC-24(2nd) | | Duty Cats | TBM-3E | VC-24(2nd): 8 Apr 1949 – 20 Apr 1950 | ASW Squadron | |
| VS-24(1st) | Duty | Duty Cats | TBM-3E, AF-2S, AF-2W, S2F-1 | VS-24(1st): 20 Apr 1950-1 Jun 1956 | | 1 June 1956 |

- VC-25(3rd)/VS-25(1st): Established 1 April 1949, disestablished 1 June 1956.

| Designation | Insignia | Nickname | Aircraft | Lineage | Notes | Disestablished |
|---|---|---|---|---|---|---|
| VC-25(3rd) | | Golden Eagles | TBM-3W, TBM-3S | VC-25(3rd): 1 Apr 1949 – 20 Apr 1950 | ASW Squadron | |
| VS-25(1st) | | Golden Eagles | AF-2S, AF-2W, S2F-1 | VS-25: 20 Apr 1950-1 June 1956 | | 1 June 1956 |

- VC-31(3rd)/VS-31: Established 28 September 1948, deactivated 31 March 2008.

| Designation | Insignia | Nickname | Aircraft | Lineage | Notes | Deactivated (Note: Chief of Naval Operations Instruction (OPNAVINST) 5030.4E dated March 1998 changed the designation system putting it in line with the system used by the USAF and USMC in that since that date U.S. Navy aircraft squadrons are no longer disestablished, they are instead "deactivated." A deactivated squadron remains in existence, though only "on paper", awaiting possible future "reactivation". Neither its designation nor any previous designations are available for use by a new squadron. A reactivated squadron would trace its lineage back to the squadron's original establishment date, including its inactive period) |
|---|---|---|---|---|---|---|
| VC-31(3rd) | | Topcats | TBM-3S, TBM-3W | VC-31(3rd): 28 Sep 1948 – 20 Apr 1950 | ASW Squadron | |
| VS-31 | (Note: (Sep 1993)) | Topcats | TBM-3S, TBM-3W, AF-2S, AF-2W, S2F-1/S-2A, S-2F, S-2E, S-2G, S-3A, S-3B | VS-31: 20 Apr 1950-31 Mar 2008 | | 31 March 2008 |

- VC-32(2nd)/VS-32: Established 31 May 1949, deactivated 30 September 2008.

| Designation | Insignia | Nickname | Aircraft | Lineage | Notes | Deactivated (Note: Chief of Naval Operations Instruction (OPNAVINST) 5030.4E dated March 1998 changed the designation system putting it in line with the system used by the USAF and USMC in that since that date U.S. Navy aircraft squadrons are no longer disestablished, they are instead "deactivated." A deactivated squadron remains in existence, though only "on paper", awaiting possible future "reactivation". Neither its designation nor any previous designations are available for use by a new squadron. A reactivated squadron would trace its lineage back to the squadron's original establishment date, including its inactive period) |
|---|---|---|---|---|---|---|
| VC-32(2nd) | | Maulers | TBM-3E, TBM-3W | VC-32(2nd): 31 May 1949 – 20 Apr 1950 | ASW Squadron | |
| VS-32 | | Maulers | TBM-3E, TBM-3W, S2F-1/S-2A, S-2B, S-3F, S-2E, S-3A, S-3B | VS-32: 20 Apr 1950-30 Sep 2008 | | 30 September 2008 |

In April 1950 the "Air Antisubmarine" squadron designation was created using the letters 'VS'. All seven VC squadrons were redesignated VS squadrons, two new Air Antisubmarine (VS) squadrons were established, and from 20 July 1950 to 1 May 1951 six U.S. Navy Reserve antisubmarine squadrons were activated for service in the Korean War (Navy Reserve squadrons were designated with three digit numbers in the 600, 700, 800 and 900 series). On 4 February 1953 five of the reserve squadrons were permanently activated and redesignated as active component squadrons and the sixth was permanently activated five months later on 8 July 1953.

Two new VS squadrons were established in September and November 1950

- VS-26(1st): Established 1 September 1950, disestablished 26 May 1956.

| Designation | Insignia | Nickname | Aircraft | Lineage | Notes | Disestablished |
|---|---|---|---|---|---|---|
| VS-26(1st) | | Ready Squadron | TBM-3E, TBM-3W, S2F-1 | VS-26(1st): 1 Sep 1950-26 May 1956 | | 26 May 1956 |

- VS-27(1st): Established 1 September 1950, disestablished 26 May 1956.

| Designation | Insignia | Nickname | Aircraft | Lineage | Notes | Disestablished |
|---|---|---|---|---|---|---|
| VS-27(1st) | | Pelicans | TBM-3S, TBM-3W, AF-2S, AF-2W, S2F-1, S2F-1F/S-2F, S-2E, S-2G | VS-27(1st): 15 Nov 1950-30 June 1973 | Disestablished with CVSG-56 | 30 June 1973 |

Six U. S. Navy Reserve squadrons were activated for Korean War between July 1950 and May 1951

- VC-931/VS-931/VS-20(1st): Activated 1 March 1951, disestablished 1 June 1956.

| Designation | Insignia | Nickname | Aircraft | Lineage | Notes | Disestablished |
|---|---|---|---|---|---|---|
| VC-931; VS-931 (Note: Inactive Navy Reserve squadron) | | | AF-2S, AF-2W, S2F-1 | VC-931: Sep 1948-1 Aug 1950; VS-931: 1 Aug 1950-4 Feb 1953 | Activated on 1 Mar 1951 | |
| VS-20(1st) | | | AF-2S, AF-2W, S2F-1 | VS-20(1st): 4 Feb 1953-1 Jun 1956 | Permanently activated and redesignated VS-20(1st) | 1 June 1956 |

- VS-801/VS-30: Activated 9 April 1951, deactivated 20 April 2007.

| Designation | Insignia | Nickname | Aircraft | Lineage | Notes | Deactivated (Note: Chief of Naval Operations Instruction (OPNAVINST) 5030.4E dated March 1998 changed the designation system putting it in line with the system used by the USAF and USMC in that since that date U.S. Navy aircraft squadrons are no longer disestablished, they are instead "deactivated." A deactivated squadron remains in existence, though only "on paper", awaiting possible future "reactivation". Neither its designation nor any previous designations are available for use by a new squadron. A reactivated squadron would trace its lineage back to the squadron's original establishment date, including its inactive period) |
|---|---|---|---|---|---|---|
| VS-801 | | | TBM-3E, TBM-3W, AF-2S, AF-2W, S2F-1/S-2A, S-2D, S-2E, S-2G, S-3A, S-3B | VS-801: 9 Apr 1951-4 Feb 1953 | Activated on 9 Apr 1951 | |
| VS-30 | | Sea Tigers, Diamondcutters (Note: (1960)) | TBM-3E, TBM-3W, AF-2S, AF-2W, S2F-1/S-2A, S-2D, S-2E, S-2G, S-3A, S-3B | VS-30: 4 Feb 1953-20 Apr 2007 | Permanently activated and redesignated VS-30 (Note: The squadron operated as the Atlantic Fleet S-2 FRS from Jun 1960 to Apr 1976.) | 20 April 2007 (Note: Though the official deactivation date is 20 April 2007 the squadron ceased operations in 2005 and held its deactivation ceremony on 9 Dec 2005) |

- VS-831/VS-36: Activated 8 February 1951, disestablished 31 May 1966.

| Designation | Insignia | Nickname | Aircraft | Lineage | Notes | Disestablished |
|---|---|---|---|---|---|---|
| VS-831 | | | TBM-3E, TBM-3W, AF-2S, AF-2W, S2F-2, S-2D | VS-831: 8 Feb 1951-4 Feb 1953 | Activated on 8 Feb 1951 | |
| VS-36 | | Gray Wolves | TBM-3E, TBM-3W, AF-2S, AF-2W, S2F-2, S-2D | VS-36: 4 Feb 1953-31 May 1966 | Permanently activated and redesignated VS-36 | 31 May 1966 |

- VA-76E/VC-871/VS-871/VS-37: Activated 1 May 1951, disestablished 31 March 1995.

| Designation | Insignia | Nickname | Aircraft | Lineage | Notes | Disestablished |
|---|---|---|---|---|---|---|
| VA-76E; VC-871; VS-871 | | | TBM-3E, TBM-3W, AF-2S, AF-2W, S2F-1, S2F-1F, S-2D, S-2E, S-2G, S-3A, S-3B | VA-76E: 14 Nov 1946-1 Sep 1948; VC-871: 1 Sep 1948-Apr 1950; VS-871: Apr 1950-8 Jul 1953 | Activated on 1 May 1951 | |
| VS-37 | | Sawbucks | TBM-3E, TBM-3W, AF-2S, AF-2W, S2F-1, S2F-1F, S-2D, S-2E, S-2G, S-3A, S-3B | VS-37: 8 July 1953-31 Mar 1995 | Permanently activated and redesignated VS-37 | 31 March 1995 |

- VC-892/VS-892/VS-38: Activated 20 July 1950, deactivated 30 April 2004.

| Designation | Insignia | Nickname | Aircraft | Lineage | Notes | Deactivated (Note: Chief of Naval Operations Instruction (OPNAVINST) 5030.4E dated March 1998 changed the designation system putting it in line with the system used by the USAF and USMC in that since that date U.S. Navy aircraft squadrons are no longer disestablished, they are instead "deactivated." A deactivated squadron remains in existence, though only "on paper", awaiting possible future "reactivation". Neither its designation nor any previous designations are available for use by a new squadron. A reactivated squadron would trace its lineage back to the squadron's original establishment date, including its inactive period) |
|---|---|---|---|---|---|---|
| VC-892; VS-892 | | | TBM-3E, TBM-3S, S2F-1/S-2A, S-2E, S-2G, S-3A, S-3B | VC-892: 20 Jul 1950-4 Aug 1950; VS-892: 4 Aug 1950-4 Feb 1953 | Activated on 20 Jul 1950 | |
| VS-38 | | Red Griffins | TBM-3E, TBM-3S, S2F-1/S-2A, S-2E, S-2G, S-3A, S-3B | VS-38: 4 Feb 1953-30 Apr 2004 | Permanently activated and redesignated VS-38 | 30 April 2004 |

- VS-931/VS-39: Activated 1 February 1951, disestablished 30 September 1968.

| Designation | Insignia | Nickname | Aircraft | Lineage | Notes | Disestablished |
|---|---|---|---|---|---|---|
| VS-913 | | | TBM-3S, TBM-3W, AF-2S, AF-2W, S2F-1/S-3A, S-2D, S-2E | VS-913: 1 Feb 1951-4 Feb 1953 | Activated on 1 Feb 1951 | |
| VS-39 | | Hoot Owls | TBM-3S, TBM-3W, AF-2S, AF-2W, S2F-1/S-3A, S-2D, S-2E | VS-39: 4 Feb 1953-30 Sep 1968 | Permanently activated and redesignated VS-39 | 30 September 1968 |

At the beginning of 1960 there were ten Air Antisubmarine squadrons as five of the fifteen squadrons which had previously been established or redesignated as Air Antisubmarine squadrons had been disestablished. From April 1960 to September 1961 ten Antisubmarine Carrier Air Groups (CVSG) were established. These CVSGs were paired with Essex-class aircraft carriers which had been converted to "Anti-Submarine Carriers" (CVS). CVSGs consisted of two Air Antisubmarine squadrons and a Helicopter Antisubmarine squadron along with detachments of airborne early warning aircraft and a detachment of fighter type aircraft for defense of the carrier and air group. Additionally there were two Readiness Antisubmarine Carrier Air Groups (RCVSG) each consisting of one Air Antisubmarine (VS) Fleet Replacement Squadron (FRS) "training" squadron and one Helicopter Antisubmarine (HS) FRS which provided trained aircrews and maintenance personnel to the fleet VS and HS squadrons. Twelve more VS squadrons were required to add to the ten existing squadrons to total the twenty-two VS squadrons to fill out ten CVSGs (two per CVSG) and two RCVSGs (one per RCVSG). Those twelve VS squadrons were established from April 1960 to August 1961.

- VS-20: Established 25 August 1961, disestablished 1 October 1962.

| Designation | Insignia | Nickname | Aircraft | Lineage | Notes | Disestablished |
|---|---|---|---|---|---|---|
| VS-20(2nd) | | | S2F-1F | VS-20: 25 Aug 1961-1 Oct 1962 | Disestablished with the short lived CVSG-62 | 1 October 1962 |

- VS-22(2nd): Established 18 May 1960, deactivated 31 March 2009.

| Designation | Insignia | Nickname | Aircraft | Lineage | Notes | Deactivated (Note: Chief of Naval Operations Instruction (OPNAVINST) 5030.4E dated March 1998 changed the designation system putting it in line with the system used by the USAF and USMC in that since that date U.S. Navy aircraft squadrons are no longer disestablished, they are instead "deactivated." A deactivated squadron remains in existence, though only "on paper", awaiting possible future "reactivation". Neither its designation nor any previous designations are available for use by a new squadron. A reactivated squadron would trace its lineage back to the squadron's original establishment date, including its inactive period) |
|---|---|---|---|---|---|---|
| VS-22(2nd) | (Note: adopted from VS-22(1st)) | Checkmates (Note: adopted from VS-22(1st)) | S2F-1/S-2F, S-2E, S-3A, S-3B | VS-22: 18 May 1960-31 Mar 2009 | | 31 March 2009 |

- VS-24(2nd): Established 24 May 1960, deactivated 31 March 2007.

| Designation | Insignia | Nickname | Aircraft | Lineage | Notes | Deactivated (Note: Chief of Naval Operations Instruction (OPNAVINST) 5030.4E dated March 1998 changed the designation system putting it in line with the system used by the USAF and USMC in that since that date U.S. Navy aircraft squadrons are no longer disestablished, they are instead "deactivated." A deactivated squadron remains in existence, though only "on paper", awaiting possible future "reactivation". Neither its designation nor any previous designations are available for use by a new squadron. A reactivated squadron would trace its lineage back to the squadron's original establishment date, including its inactive period) |
|---|---|---|---|---|---|---|
| VS-24(2nd) | (Note: adopted from VS-24(1st)) | Scouts | S2F-1/S-2A, S-2F, S-2D, S-2E, S-2G, S-3A, S-3B | VS-24: 24 May 1960-31 Mar 2007 | | 31 March 2007 |

- VS-25(2nd): Established 1 September 1960, disestablished 27 September 1968.

| Designation | Insignia | Nickname | Aircraft | Lineage | Notes | Disestablished |
|---|---|---|---|---|---|---|
| VS-25(2nd) | (Note: adopted from VS-25(1st)) | Golden Eagles (Note: adopted from VS-25(1st)) | S2F-1F/S-2F, S-2E | VS-25: 1 Sep 1960-27 Sep 1968 | Disestablished with CVSG-55 | 27 September 1968 |

- VS-26: Established 1 June 1960, disestablished 1 May 1966.

| Designation | Insignia | Nickname | Aircraft | Lineage | Notes | Disestablished |
|---|---|---|---|---|---|---|
| VS-26(2nd) | | Lucky Tigers | S2F-2F/S-2B, D | VS-26: 1 Jun 1960-1 May 1966 | Disestablished with CVSG-58 | 31 May 1966 |

- VS-28: Established 1 June 1960, disestablished 1 October 1992.

| Designation | Insignia | Nickname | Aircraft | Lineage | Notes | Disestablished |
|---|---|---|---|---|---|---|
| VS-28 | | Gamblers | S2F-1/S-2A, S-2E, S-3A, S-3B | VS-28: 1 Jun 1960-1 Oct 1992 | | 1 October 1992 |

- VS-29: Established 1 April 1960, deactivated 30 April 2004.

| Designation | Insignia | Nickname | Aircraft | Lineage | Notes | Deactivated (Note: Chief of Naval Operations Instruction (OPNAVINST) 5030.4E dated March 1998 changed the designation system putting it in line with the system used by the USAF and USMC in that since that date U.S. Navy aircraft squadrons are no longer disestablished, they are instead "deactivated." A deactivated squadron remains in existence, though only "on paper", awaiting possible future "reactivation". Neither its designation nor any previous designations are available for use by a new squadron. A reactivated squadron would trace its lineage back to the squadron's original establishment date, including its inactive period) |
|---|---|---|---|---|---|---|
| VS-29 | | Dragonfires | S2F-1/S-2A, S-2F, S-2E, S-3A, S-3B | VS-29: 1 April 1960-30 Apr 2004 | | 30 April 2004 |

- VS-33: Established 1 April 1960, deactivated 31 July 2006.

| Designation | Insignia | Nickname | Aircraft | Lineage | Notes | Deactivated (Note: Chief of Naval Operations Instruction (OPNAVINST) 5030.4E dated March 1998 changed the designation system putting it in line with the system used by the USAF and USMC in that since that date U.S. Navy aircraft squadrons are no longer disestablished, they are instead "deactivated." A deactivated squadron remains in existence, though only "on paper", awaiting possible future "reactivation". Neither its designation nor any previous designations are available for use by a new squadron. A reactivated squadron would trace its lineage back to the squadron's original establishment date, including its inactive period) |
|---|---|---|---|---|---|---|
| VS-33 | | Screwbirds | S2F-1/S-2A, S-2E, S-2G, S-3A, S-3B | VS-33: 1 Apr 1960-31 Jul 2006 | | 31 July 2006 |

- VS-34: Established 2 May 1960, disestablished 1 October 1968.

| Designation | Insignia | Nickname | Aircraft | Lineage | Notes | Disestablished |
|---|---|---|---|---|---|---|
| VS-34 | | Proud Tigers | S2F-1, S-2D, S-2E | VS-34: 2 May 1960-1 Oct 1968 | Disestablished with CVSG-60 | 1 October 1968 |

- VS-35: Established 3 January 1961, disestablished 30 June 1973.

| Designation | Insignia | Nickname | Aircraft | Lineage | Notes | Disestablished |
|---|---|---|---|---|---|---|
| VS-35(1st) | | Boomerangers | S2F-1, S2F-33/S-2D, S-2E | VS-35: 3 Jan 1961-30 Jun 1973 | Disestablished with CVSG-53 | 30 June 1973 |

- VS-41: Established 30 June 1960, deactivated 30 September 2006.

| Designation | Insignia | Nickname | Aircraft | Lineage | Notes | Deactivated (Note: Chief of Naval Operations Instruction (OPNAVINST) 5030.4E dated March 1998 changed the designation system putting it in line with the system used by the USAF and USMC in that since that date U.S. Navy aircraft squadrons are no longer disestablished, they are instead "deactivated." A deactivated squadron remains in existence, though only "on paper", awaiting possible future "reactivation". Neither its designation nor any previous designations are available for use by a new squadron. A reactivated squadron would trace its lineage back to the squadron's original establishment date, including its inactive period) |
|---|---|---|---|---|---|---|
| VS-41 | | Shamrocks | S2F-1F/S-2F, S-2D, S-2E, S-3A, S-3B | 30 June 1960-30 Sep 2007 | Pacific Fleet S-2 and S-3 FRS (Note: On 20 February 1974 this squadron was the first to receive the Lockheed S-3A Viking aircraft. It operated as the single S-3 FRS until VS-27 was established in January 1987 as the Atlantic Fleet S-3 FRS) | 30 September 2006 |

- VS-42: Established 25 August 1961, disestablished 1 October 1962.

| Designation | Insignia | Nickname | Aircraft | Lineage | Notes | Disestablished |
|---|---|---|---|---|---|---|
| VS-42 | | | S2F-1F | VS-42: 25 Aug 1961-1 Oct 1962 | Disestablished with the short lived CVSG-62 | 1 October 1962 |

A decade later, by 1970 six of the ten CVSGs had been disestablished along with eight of the twenty-two VS squadrons leaving the two RCVSGs each with a VS FRS, and three VS squadrons for each of the four remaining CVSGs. Both RCVSGs and the four remaining CVSG were all disestablished by 30 June 1973 along with two of the remaining fourteen VS squadrons. With the demise of the Antisubmarine carriers and Antisubmarine Carrier Air Groups VS squadrons were assigned to Carrier Air Wings (CVW), one VS squadron to each and from this point on the number of VS squadrons was determined by the number of CVWs plus two Fleet Replacement Squadrons until 1976 when VS-30 ceased operations as an FRS leaving VS-41 as the single VS FRS. A list of the VS squadrons which remained after these disestablishments along with squadron histories can be found at this reference:

In 1976 a new squadron was planned for establishment in conjunction with the fleet wide introduction of the new Lockheed S-3A Viking which had become operational in 1975, however sufficient resources were not available and the squadron was disestablished six months after its establishment without ever becoming operational

- VS-35(2nd): Established 1 October 1976, disestablished 30 March 1977.

| Designation | Insignia | Nickname | Aircraft | Lineage | Notes | Disestablished |
|---|---|---|---|---|---|---|
| VS-35(2nd) | | | None | VS-35(2nd): 1 Oct 1976-30 Mar 1977 | | 30 March 1977 |

In 1987 a second S-3 Viking Fleet Replacement Squadron was established to support the fleet wide VS transition from the S-3A to the S-3B. Also a new Carrier Air Wing was planned for establishment and a new VS squadron was established for it; however, the air wing's establishment was cancelled and it and its squadrons were disestablished less than eighteen months later.

- VS-27: Established 22 January 1987, disestablished 30 September 1994.

| Designation | Insignia | Nickname | Aircraft | Lineage | Notes | Disestablished |
|---|---|---|---|---|---|---|
| VS-27(2nd) | | Sea Wolves | S-3A | VS-27: 22 Jan 1987-30 Sep 1994 | Atlantic Fleet S-3 FRS | 30 September 1994 |

- VS-35(3rd): Established 3 March 1987, disestablished 1 June 1988.

| Designation | Insignia | Nickname | Aircraft | Lineage | Notes | Disestablished |
|---|---|---|---|---|---|---|
| VS-35(3rd) | (Note: adopted from disestablished VS-35(1st)) | Boomerangers (Note: adopted from disestablished VS-35(1st)) | S-3A | VS-35: 3 Mar 1987-1 Jun 1988 | Established for CVW-10 (Note: Established as part of a new Carrier Air Wing 10 however the squadron was short lived as Carrier Air Wing 10 and its squadrons were disestablished less than 18 months later) | 1 June 1988 |

In 1991 one final VS squadron was established.

- VS-35(4th): Established 4 April 1991, deactivated 31 March 2005.

| Designation | Insignia | Nickname | Aircraft | Lineage | Notes | Deactivated (Note: Chief of Naval Operations Instruction (OPNAVINST) 5030.4E dated March 1998 changed the designation system putting it in line with the system used by the USAF and USMC in that since that date U.S. Navy aircraft squadrons are no longer disestablished, they are instead "deactivated." A deactivated squadron remains in existence, though only "on paper", awaiting possible future "reactivation". Neither its designation nor any previous designations are available for use by a new squadron. A reactivated squadron would trace its lineage back to the squadron's original establishment date, including its inactive period) |
|---|---|---|---|---|---|---|
| VS-35(4th) | | Blue Wolves | S-3A, S-3B | VS-35: 4 Apr 1991-31 Mar 2005 | | 31 March 2005 |

U. S. Navy Reserve Squadrons
On 1 May 1970 the Navy Reserve established two Reserve Antisubmarine Carrier Air Groups (CVSGR)s, CVSGR-70 and CVSGR-80. Modeling them on the four CVGSs which still existed at the time each CVSGR consisted of three Air Antisubmarine (VS) squadrons and two Helicopter Antisubmarine (HS) squadrons along with an Airborne Early Warning (VAW) squadron and an Antisubmarine Fighter (VSF) squadron. The CVGRs were disestablished on 30 June 1976 and 30 July 1976.

Air Antisubmarine squadrons of CVSGR-70

| Designation | Insignia | Nickname | Aircraft | Lineage | Notes | Disestablished |
|---|---|---|---|---|---|---|
| VS-71 | | | S-2E | 1 Jul 1970-1 Jan 1975 | United States Navy Reserve Squadrons. Air Antisubmarine squadrons of CVSGR-70 | 1 January 1975 |
| VS-72 | | | S-2E | 1 Jul 1970-1 Jan 1975 | United States Navy Reserve Squadrons. Air Antisubmarine squadrons of CVSGR-70 | 1 January 1975 |
| VS-73 | | Blue Bandits | S-2E | 1 Jul 1970-1 Jan 1975 | United States Navy Reserve Squadrons. Air Antisubmarine squadrons of CVSGR-70 | 1 January 1975 |

Air Antisubmarine squadrons of CVSGR-80

| Designation | Insignia | Nickname | Aircraft | Lineage | Notes | Disestablished |
|---|---|---|---|---|---|---|
| VS-81 | | | S-2E | 1 Jul 1970-1 Jan 1975 | United States Navy Reserve Squadrons. Air Antisubmarine squadrons of CVSGR-80 | 1 January 1975 |
| VS-82 | | | S-2E | 1 Jul 1970-1 Jan 1975 | United States Navy Reserve Squadrons. Air Antisubmarine squadrons of CVSGR-80 | 1 January 1975 |
| VS-83 | | | S-2E | 1 Jul 1970-1 Jan 1975 | United States Navy Reserve Squadrons. Air Antisubmarine squadrons of CVSGR-80 | 1 January 1975 |

=== (VP) Patrol Squadrons ===
| Squadron Designation | Insignia | Nickname | Aircraft | Disestablished | Notes |
|---|---|---|---|---|---|
| VP-1 | | | Curtiss N-9 | July 1922 | |
| VP-1 (1924-6) | | | Felixstowe F5L | 3 May 1926 | |
| VP-1 (1937–9) | | | | | redesignated VP-21 on 1 July 1939 |
| VP-1 (1940) | | | | | redesignated VP-101 on 3 December 1940 |
| VP-1 (1943–4) | | | | | redesignated VPB-1 on 1 October 1944 |
| VP-1B | | | | | redesignated VP-1F on 15 April 1933 |
| VP-1D14 | | | | | redesignated VP-1B on 1 July 1931 |
| VP-1F | | | | | redesignated VP-1 on 1 October 1937 |
| VP-2 | | | | | redesignated VP-31 on 1 July 1939 |
| VP-2 (1948–69) | | | Lockheed SP-2H Neptune | 30 September 1969 | |
| VP-2D15 | | | | | redesignated VP-2S on 1 July 1931 |
| VP-2F | | | | | redesignated VP-2 on 1 October 1937 |
| VP-2S | | | | | redesignated VP-2F on 17 July 1933 |
| VP-3 | | | | | redesignated VP-32 on 1 July 1939 |
| VP-3 (1948–55) | | | Lockheed P2V-5 | 1 November 1955 | |
| VP-3F | | | | | redesignated VP-3 on 1 October 1937 |
| VP-3S | | | | | redesignated VP-3F on 17 July 1933 |
| VP-4-1 | | Tophatters | | Not Applicable. Still exists as VFA-14 | Established in Sep 1919 as Air Detachment Pacific Fleet, redesignated VT-5 1920, redesignated VP-4-1 1921, redesignated VF-4 1921, redesignated VF-1 1922, redesignated VF-1B 1927 redesignated VB-2B 1934, redesignated VB-3 1937, redesignated VB-4 1939, redesignated VS-41 1941, redesignated VB-41 1943, redesignated VB-4 1943, redesignated VA-1A 1946, redesignated VA-14 1948 redesignated VF-14 in 1949 redesignated VFA-14 on 1 Dec 2001. This is the oldest continuously operating squadron in the U.S. Navy. |
| VP-4 | | | | | redesignated VP-22 on 1 July 1939 |
| VP-4B | | | | | redesignated VP-4F on 17 July 1933 |
| VP-4D14 | | | | | redesignated VP-4B on 21 January 1931 |
| VP-4F | | | | | redesignated VP-4 on 1 October 1937 |
| VP-6 (1924-6) | | | F5L | 3 May 1926 | |
| VP-6 (1937–9) | | | | | redesignated VP-23 on 1 July 1939 |
| VP-6 (1948–93) | | Blue Sharks | Lockheed P-3 Orion | 31 May 1993 | NAS Barbers Point |
| VP-6B | | | | | redesignated VP-6F on 17 July 1933 |
| VP-6F | | | | | redesignated VP-6 on 1 October 1937 |
| VP-7 | | | | | redesignated VP-11 on 1 July 1939 |
| VP-7 (1948–69) | | Dragon Patrol; Black Falcons | SP-2H | 8 October 1969 | |
| VP-7B | | | | | redesignated VP-7F on 1 July 1931 |
| VP-7F | | | | | redesignated VP-7 on 1 October 1937 |
| VP-8 | | | | | redesignated VP-24 on 1 July 1939 |
| VP-8F | | | | | redesignated VP-8 on 1 October 1937 |
| VP-8S | | | | | redesignated VP-8F on 3 April 1933 |
| VP-9 | | | | | redesignated VP-12 on 1 July 1939 |
| VP-9B | | | | | redesignated VP-9F on 26 October 1931 |
| VP-9F | | | | | redesignated VP-9 on 1 October 1937 |
| VP-9S | | | | | redesignated VP-9B on 1 October 1930 |
| VP-10 | | | | | redesignated VP-2D15 on 21 September 1927 |
| VP-10 (1937–9) | | | | | redesignated VP-25 on 1 July 1939 |
| VP-10F | | | | | redesignated VP-10 on 1 October 1937 |
| VP-10S | | | | | redesignated VP-10F on 17 July 1933 |
| VP-11 | | | | | redesignated VP-54 on 1 October 1937 |
| VP-11 (1939–41) | | | | | redesignated VP-21 on 1 February 1941 |
| VP-11 (1941–4) | | | | | redesignated VPB-11 on 1 October 1944 |
| VP-11 (1952–97) | | Proud Pegasus | P-3 | 15 January 1997 | |
| VP-11F | | | | | redesignated VP-11 on 1 October 1937 |
| VP-12 (1937–9) | | | | | redesignated VP-51 on 1 July 1939 |
| VP-12 (1939–41) | | | | | redesignated VP-24 on 1 August 1941 |
| VP-12 (1941–4) | | | | | redesignated VPB-120 on 1 October 1944 |
| VP-12F | | | | | redesignated VP-12 on 1 October 1937 |
| VP-13 | | | | | redesignated VP-26 on 11 December 1939 |
| VP-13 (1940–4) | | | | | redesignated VPB-13 on 1 October 1944 |
| VP-14 | | | | | redesignated VP-1D14 on 21 September 1927 |
| VP-14 (1937–9) | | | | | redesignated VP-52 on 1 July 1939 |
| VP-14 (1940–1) | | | | | redesignated VP-26 on 15 April 1941 |
| VP-14 (1941–4) | | | | | redesignated VPB-14 on 1 October 1944 |
| VP-14F | | | | | redesignated VP-14 on 4 September 1937 |
| VP-15 | | | | | redesignated VP-53 on 1 July 1939 |
| VP-15 (1943–4) | | | | | redesignated VPB-15 on 1 October 1944 |
| VP-15F | | | | | redesignated VP-15 on 1 October 1937 |
| VP-16 | | | | | redesignated VP-41 on 1 July 1939 |
| VP-16 (1943–4) | | | | | redesignated VPB-16 on 1 October 1944 |
| VP-16F | | | | | redesignated VP-16 on 1 October 1937 |
| VP-17 (1944) | | | | | redesignated VPB-17 on 1 October 1944 |
| VP-17 (1953–6) | | | | | redesignated VA(HM)-10 on 1 July 1956 |
| VP-17 (1959–95) | | White Lightnings | P-3 | 31 March 1995 | NAS Barbers Point |
| VP-18 (1937–9) | | | | | redesignated VP-13 on 1 July 1939 |
| VP-18 (1944) | | | | | redesignated VPB-18 on 1 October 1944 |
| VP-18 (1953–68) | | Flying Phantoms | P-2 | 10 October 1968 | |
| VP-19 | | | | | redesignated VP-43 on 1 July 1939 |
| VP-19 (1944) | | | | | redesignated VPB-19 on 1 October 1944 |
| VP-19 (1946) | | | | | redesignated VP-MS-9 on 15 November 1946 |
| VP-19 (1953–91) | | Big Red | P-3 | 31 August 1991 | NAS Moffett Field |
| VP-20 | | | | | redesignated VP-44 on 1 July 1940 |
| VP-20 (1944) | | | | | redesignated VPB-20 on 1 October 1944 |
| VP-20 (1948–9) | | | PB4Y-2 | 31 March 1949 | |
| VP-21 | | | | | redesignated VP-45 on 1 July 1939 |
| VP-21 (1939–40) | | | | | redesignated VP-1 on 30 July 1940 |
| VP-21 (1941–2) | | | PBY-5 | 18 April 1942 | merged with VP-101 and VP-22 |
| VP-21 (1944) | | | | | redesignated VPB-21 on 1 October 1944 |
| VP-21 (1946) | | | | | redesignated VP-MS-11 on 15 November 1946 |
| VP-21 (1948–69) | | Black Jacks | P-2 | 21 November 1969 | NAS Brunswick |
| VP-22 | | | PBY-5 | 18 April 1942 | merged with VP-101 on 18 April 1942 |
| VP-22 (1944) | | | | | redesignated VPB-22 on 1 October 1944 |
| VP-22 (1946) | | | | | redesignated VP-MS-2 on 15 November 1946 |
| VP-22 (1948–94) | | Blue Geese | P-3 | 31 March 1994 | NAS Barbers Point |
| VP-23 | | | | | redesignated VP-11 on 1 August 1941 |
| VP-23 (1941–4) | | | | | redesignated VPB-23 on 1 October 1944 |
| VP-23 (1946–95) | | Sea Hawks | P-3 | 28 February 1995 | NAS Brunswick |
| VP-24 | | | | | redesignated VP-12 on 1 August 1941 |
| VP-24 (1941–4) | | | | | redesignated VPB-24 on 1 October 1944 |
| VP-24 (1948–56) | | | | | redesignated as VA-HM-13 on 1 July 1956 |
| VP-24 (1959–95) | | Batmen | P-3 | 30 April 1995 | NAS Jacksonville |
| VP-25 | | | | | redesignated VP-23 on 1 August 1941 |
| VP-25 (1944) | | | | | redesignated VPB-25 on 1 October 1944 |
| VP-25 (1946) | | | PBM-3D2 | 28 June 1946 | |
| VP-25 (1948–50) | | Bulldogs | PB4Y-2B | 1 January 1950 | |
| VP-26 | | | | | redesignated VP-102 on 16 December 1940 |
| VP-26 (1941) | | | | | redesignated VP-14 on 1 July 1941 |
| VP-26 (1944) | | | | | redesignated VPB-26 on 1 October 1944 |
| VP-26 (1946) | | | PBM-5 | 14 December 1946 | |
| VP-27 | | | PB4Y-2 | 11 January 1950 | |
| VP-28 | | | | | redesignated VPB-28 on 1 October 1944 |
| VP-28 (1946) | | | | | redesignated VP-MS-3 on 15 November 1946 |
| VP-28 (1948–69) | | Hawaiian Warriors | P-3A | 1 October 1969 | |
| VP-29 | | | PB4Y-2 | 18 January 1950 | |
| VP-29 (1952–55) | | | P2V-7 | 1 November 1955 | |
| VP-31 | | | | | redesignated VB-105 on 15 May 1943 |
| VP-31 (1960–93) | | Black Lightnings/Genies | P-3 | 1 November 1993 | NAS Moffett Field; West Coast FRS |
| VP-32 | | | | | redesignated VP-52 on 1 July 1941 |
| VP-32 (1948–9) | | | PBY-6A | 6 June 1949 | |
| VP-33 | | | | | redesignated VPB-33 on 1 October 1944 |
| VP-33 (1948–9) | | | PBM-5A | 15 December 1949 | |
| VP-34 | | | | | redesignated VPB-34 on 1 October 1944 |
| VP-34 (1948–56) | | | PBM-5S | 30 June 1956 | |
| VP-40 | | | PBM-5E | 25 January 1950 | |
| VP-41 | | | | | redesignated VB-136 on 1 March 1943 |
| VP-41 (1948–9) | | | PBM-3D | 23 April 1949 | |
| VP-42 | | | SP-2H | 26 September 1969 | |
| VP-43 | | | | | redesignated VP-81 on 1 July 1941 |
| VP-43 (1941–4) | | | | | redesignated VPB-43 on 1 October 1944 |
| VP-43 (1948–9) | | | PBM-3D | 31 March 1949 | |
| VP-44 (1940–1) | | | | | redesignated VP-61 on 6 January 1941 |
| VP-44 (1941–4) | | | | | redesignated VPB-44 on 1 October 1944 |
| VP-44 (1948–50) | | | PBM | 20 January 1950 | NAS Norfolk |
| VP-44 (1951-91) | | Golden Pelicans | P-3 | 28 June 1991 | NAS Brunswick |
| VP-45 | | | | | redesignated VP-14 on 1 December 1939 |
| VP-45 (1943–4) | | | | | redesignated VPB-45 on 1 October 1944 |
| VP-48 | | | PBM-5 | 31 December 1949 | |
| VP-48 (1946-91) | | Boomers | P-3 | 23 May 1991 | NAS Moffett Field |
| VP-49 | | Woodpeckers | P-3 | 1 March 1994 | NAS Jacksonville |
| VP-50 | | Blue Dragons | P-3 | 30 June 1992 | NAS Moffett Field |
| VP-51 | | | | | redesignated VP-71 on 1 July 1941 |
| VP-51 (1941–3) | | | | | redesignated VB-101 on 1 March 1943 |
| VP-51 (1948–50) | | | PB4Y-2 | 1 February 1950 | |
| VP-52 | | | | | redesignated VP-72 on 1 July 1941 |
| VP-52 (1941–4) | | | | | redesignated VPB-52 on 1 October 1944 |
| VP-53 | | | | | redesignated VP-73 on 1 July 1941 |
| VP-53 (1942–4) | | | | | redesignated VPB-53 on 1 October 1944 |
| VP-53 (1946) | | | | | redesignated VP-AM-1 on 15 November 1946 |
| VP-54 | | | | | redesignated VP-51 on 1 July 1941 |
| VP-54 (1942–4) | | | | | redesignated VPB-54 on 1 October 1944 |
| VP-55 | | | | | redesignated VP-74 on 1 July 1941 |
| VP-56 | | | | | redesignated OTS on 1 July 1941 |
| VP-56 (1953–91) | | Dragons | P-3 | 28 June 1991 | NAS Jacksonville |
| VP-60 | | Cobras | P-3 | 1 September 1994 | USNR NAS Glenview |
| VP-61 | | | | | redesignated VP-82 on 1 July 1941 |
| VP-61 (1942–4) | | | | | redesignated VPB-61 on 1 October 1944 |
| VP-61 (1948–50) | | | SNB-2P | 17 January 1950 | |
| VP-61 (1951–2) | | | | | redesignated VJ-61 on 5 March 1952 |
| VP-62 | | | PBY-5A | 1 July 1943 | |
| VP-62 (1943–4) | | | | | redesignated VPB-62 on 1 October 1944 |
| VP-62 (1946) | | | | | redesignated VP-AM-2 on 15 November 1946 |
| VP-62 (1948–50) | | | PB4Y-1P | 30 January 1950 | |
| VP-63 | | | | | redesignated VPB-63 on 1 October 1944 |
| VP-67 | | Golden Hawks | P-3 | 30 September 1994 | USNR NAS Memphis |
| VP-68 | | Blackhawks | P-3 | 16 January 1997 | USNR NAF Washington/Andrews AFB |
| VP-71 | | | | | redesignated VPB-71 on 1 October 1944 |
| VP-71 (1946) | | | | | redesignated VP-AM-3 on 15 November 1946 |
| VP-72 | | | | | redesignated VPB-122 on 1 October 1944 |
| VP-73 | | | | | redesignated VPB-73 on 1 October 1944 |
| VP-73 (1946) | | | | | redesignated VP-AM-4 on 15 November 1946 |
| VP-74 | | | | | redesignated VPB-74 on 1 October 1944 |
| VP-74 (1946) | | | | | redesignated VP-MS-10 on 15 November 1946 |
| VP-81 | | | | | redesignated VPB-121 on 1 October 1944 |
| VP-82 | | | | | redesignated VB-125 on 1 March 1943 |
| VP-83 | | | | | redesignated VB-107 on 15 May 1943 |
| VP-84 | | | | | redesignated VPB-84 on 1 October 1944 |
| VP-90 | | Lions | P-3 | 30 September 1994 | USNR NAS Glenview |
| VP-91 | | | | | redesignated VPB-91 on 1 October 1944 |
| VP-92 | | | | | redesignated VPB-92 on 1 October 1944 |
| VP-93 | | Executioners | P-3 | 30 September 1994 | USNR NAF Detroit/Selfridge ANGB |
| VP-94 | | | | | redesignated VPB-94 on 1 October 1944 |
| VP-100 | | | | | redesignated VPB-100 on 1 October 1944 |
| VP-101 | | | | | redesignated VPB-29 on 1 October 1944 |
| VP-102 | | Unknown | PBY | 18 April 1942 | |
| VP-102 (1943–4) | | | | | redesignated VPB-4 on 1 October 1944 |
| VP-102 (1946) | | | | | redesignated VP-HL-2 on 15 November 1946 |
| VP-104 | | | | | redesignated as VP-HL-4 on 15 November 1946, |
| VP-106 | | Wolverators | PB4Y-2 | 5 October 1946 | |
| VP-107 | | | | | redesignated VP-HL-7 on 15 November 1946 |
| VP-108 | | | | | redesignated VP-HL-8 on 15 November 1946 |
| VP-111 | | | | | redesignated VP-HL-11 on 15 November 1946 |
| VP-115 | | | | | redesignated VP-HL-13 on 15 November 1946 |
| VP-116 | | | | | redesignated VP-HL-1 on 15 November 1946 |
| VP-119 | | | | | redesignated VP-HL-9 on 15 November 1946 |
| VP-120 | | | | | redesignated VP-HL-10 on 15 November 1946 |
| VP-122 | | | | | redesignated VP-HL-12 on 15 November 1946 |
| VP-123 | | | PB4Y-2 | 1 October 1946 | |
| VP-124 | | | | | redesignated VP-HL-3 on 15 November 1946 |
| VP-130 | | | | | redesignated VP-ML-2 on 15 November 1946 |
| VP-131 | | | PV-2 | 11 June 1946 | |
| VP-133 | | | PV-2 | 17 June 1946 | |
| VP-136 | | | | | redesignated VP-ML-3 on 15 November 1946 |
| VP-142 | | | PV-2 | 14 June 1946 | |
| VP-143 | | | | | redesignated VP-HL-5 on 15 November 1946 |
| VP-146 | | | | | redesignated VP-ML-6 on 15 November 1946 |
| VP-148 | | | PV-2 | 15 June 1946 | |
| VP-152 | | | PV-2 | 14 June 1946 | |
| VP-153 | | | PV-2 | 14 June 1946 | |
| VP-202 | | | | | redesignated VPB-202 on 1 October 1944 |
| VP-203 | | | | | redesignated VPB-203 on 1 October 1944 |
| VP-204 (1942–4) | | | | | redesignated VPB-204 on 1 October 1944 |
| VP-204 (1946) | | | | | redesignated VP-MS-4 on 15 November 1946 |
| VP-206 | | | | | redesignated VPB-206 on 1 October 1944 |
| VP-207 | | | | | redesignated VPB-207 on 1 October 1944 |
| VP-208 | | | | | redesignated VPB-208 on 1 October 1944 |
| VP-208 (1946) | | | | | redesignated VP-MS-8 on 15 November 1946 |
| VP-209 | | | | | redesignated VPB-209 on 1 October 1944 |
| VP-210 | | | | | redesignated VPB-210 on 1 October 1944 |
| VP-211 | | | | | redesignated VPB-211 on 1 October 1944 |
| VP-212 | | | | | redesignated VPB-212 on 1 October 1944 |
| VP-213 | | | | | redesignated VPB-213 on 1 October 1944 |
| VP-214 | | | | | redesignated VPB-214 on 1 October 1944 |
| VP-215 | | | | | redesignated VPB-215 on 1 October 1944 |
| VP-216 | | | | | redesignated VPB-216 on 1 October 1944 |
| VP-661 | | | | | redesignated VP-56 on 4 February 1953 |
| VP-731 | | | | | redesignated VP-48 on 4 February 1953 |
| VP-772 | | | | | redesignated VP-17 on 4 February 1953 |
| VP-812 | | | | | redesignated VP-29 on 27 August 1952 |
| VP-861 | | | | | redesignated VP-18 on 4 February 1953 |
| VP-871 | | | | | redesignated VP-19 on 4 February 1953 |
| VP-892 | | | | | redesignated VP-50 on 4 February 1953 |
| VP-900 | | | | | redesignated VP-ML-71 on 15 November 1946 |
| VP-905 | | | | | redesignated VP-ML-55 on 15 November 1946 |
| VP-907 | | | | | redesignated VP-ML-57 on 15 November 1946 |
| VP-911 | | | | | redesignated VP-ML-61 on 15 November 1946 |
| VP-914 | | | | | redesignated VP-ML-64 on 15 November 1946 |
| VP-916 | | | | | redesignated VP-ML-66 on 15 November 1946 |
| VP-917 | | | | | redesignated VP-ML-67 on 15 November 1946 |
| VPB-1 | | | PB2Y-3 | 6 March 1945 | |
| VPB-4 | | | PB2Y-3R | 1 November 1945 | |
| VPB-11 | | | PBY-5 | 20 June 1945 | |
| VPB-13 | | | PB2Y-5 | 1 December 1945 | |
| VPB-14 | | | | | redesignated VPB-197 on 2 December 1944 |
| VPB-15 | | | PB2Y-5 | 23 November 1945 | |
| VPB-16 | | | PBM-3D | 30 June 1945 | |
| VPB-17 | | | PBM-3D | 30 January 1946 | |
| VPB-18 | | Unknown | PBM | 23 November 1945 | |
| VPB-19 | | | | | redesignated VP-19 on 15 May 1946 |
| VPB-20 | | | PBM-5 | 4 February 1946 | |
| VPB-21 | | | | | redesignated VP-21 on 15 May 1946 |
| VPB-22 | | | | | redesignated VP-22 on 15 May 1946 |
| VPB-23 | | | PBY-5A | 25 January 1946 | |
| VPB-24 | | | PBY-5A | 30 June 1945 | |
| VPB-25 | | | | | redesignated VP-25 on 15 May 1946 |
| VPB-26 | | | | | redesignated VP-26 on 15 May 1946 |
| VPB-28 | | | | | redesignated VP-28 on 25 June 1946 |
| VPB-29 | | | PBY-5 | 20 June 1945 | |
| VPB-33 | | | PBY-5A | 7 April 1945 | |
| VPB-34 | | | PBY-5 | 7 April 1945 | |
| VPB-43 | | | PBY-5A | 15 September 1945 | |
| VPB-44 | | | PBY-5A | 20 June 1945 | |
| VPB-45 | | | PBY-5A | 5 June 1945 | |
| VPB-52 | | | PBY-5 | 7 April 1945 | |
| VPB-53 | | | | | redesignated VP-53 on 15 May 1946 |
| VPB-54 | | | PBY-5A | 7 April 1945 | |
| VPB-61 | | | PBY-5A | 15 September 1945 | |
| VPB-62 | | | | | redesignated VP-62 on 15 May 1946 |
| VPB-63 | | Madcats | PBY-5 | 2 July 1945 | |
| VPB-71 | | | | | redesignated VP-71 on 15 May 1946 |
| VPB-73 | | | | | redesignated VP-73 on 15 May 1946 |
| VPB-74 | | | | | redesignated VP-74 on 15 May 1946 |
| VPB-84 | | | PBY-5 | 28 June 1945 | |
| VPB-91 | | | PBM-3S | 2 April 1946 | |
| VPB-92 | | | PBY-5A | 28 May 1945 | |
| VPB-94 | | | PBY-5A | 22 December 1944 | |
| VPB-98 | | | PBM-5D | 1 April 1946 | |
| VPB-99 | | | PBM-5D | 15 January 1946 | |
| VPB-100 | | | PV-2 | 15 December 1945 | |
| VPB-101 | | | | | redesignated VX-4 on 15 May 1946 |
| VPB-102 | | | | | redesignated VP-102 on 15 May 1946 |
| VPB-103 | | | PB4Y-2 | 31 August 1945 | |
| VPB-104 | | | | | redesignated as VP-104 on 15 May 1946 |
| VPB-105 | | | PB4Y-1 | 27 June 1945 | |
| VPB-106 | | | | | redesignated VP-106 on 15 May 1946 |
| VPB-107 | | | | | redesignated VP-107 on 15 May 1946 |
| VPB-108 | | | | | redesignated VP-108 on 15 May 1946 |
| VPB-109 | | | PB4Y-2 | 12 October 1945 | |
| VPB-110 | | | PB4Y-1 | 1 September 1945 | |
| VPB-111 | | | | | redesignated VP-111 on 15 May 1946 |
| VPB-112 | | | PB4Y-2 | 1 September 1945 | |
| VPB-113 | | | PB4Y-1 | 28 May 1945 | |
| VPB-115 | | | | | redesignated VP-115 on 15 May 1946 |
| VPB-116 | | | | | redesignated VP-116 on 15 May 1946 |
| VPB-117 | | | PB4Y-2 | 15 November 1945 | |
| VPB-118 | | | PB4Y-2 | 11 December 1945 | |
| VPB-119 | | | | | redesignated VP-119 on 15 May 1946 |
| VPB-120 | | | | | redesignated VP-120 on 15 May 1946 |
| VPB-121 | | | PB4Y-2 | 1 June 1946 | |
| VPB-122 | | | | | redesignated VP-122 on 15 May 1946 |
| VPB-123 | | | | | redesignated VP-123 on 15 May 1946 |
| VPB-124 | | | | | redesignated VP-124 on 15 May 1946 |
| VPB-125 | | | PV-1 | 8 June 1945 | |
| VPB-126 | | | PV-1 | 27 June 1945 | |
| VPB-127 | | | PV-1 | 10 July 1945 | |
| VPB-129 | | | PV-1 | 4 June 1945 | |
| VPB-130 | | | | | redesignated VP-130 on 15 May 1946 |
| VPB-131 | | | | | redesignated VP-131 on 15 May 1946 |
| VPB-132 | | | PV-1 | 30 May 1945 | |
| VPB-133 | | | | | redesignated VP-133 on 15 May 1946 |
| VPB-134 | | | PV-1 | 25 April 1945 | |
| VPB-136 | | | | | redesignated VP-136 on 15 May 1946 |
| VPB-137 | | | PV-1 | 20 July 1945 | |
| VPB-138 | | | | | redesignated VPB-124 on 15 December 1944 |
| VPB-139 | | Vee-Bees | PV-2 | 13 September 1945 | |
| VPB-140 | | | | | redesignated VPB-123 on 20 November 1944 |
| VPB-141 | | | PV-2 | 16 June 1945 | |
| VPB-142 | | | | | redesignated VP-142 on 15 May 1946 |
| VPB-143 | | | | | redesignated VP-143 on 15 May 1946 |
| VPB-145 | | | PV-1 | 18 June 1945 | |
| VPB-146 | | | | | redesignated as VP-146 on 15 May 1946 |
| VPB-147 | | | PV-2 | 2 July 1945 | |
| VPB-148 | | | | | redesignated VP-148 on 15 May 1946 |
| VPB-149 | | | PV-1 | 6 September 1945 | |
| VPB-150 | | Devilfish P-Viators | PV-2 | 20 July 1945 | |
| VPB-151 | | | PV-1 | 30 June 1945 | |
| VPB-152 | | | | | redesignated VP-152 on 15 May 1946 |
| VPB-153 | | | | | redesignated VP-153 on 15 May 1946 |
| VPB-197 | | | PB4Y-1 | 1 April 1946 | |
| VPB-198 | | | PV-2 | 1 April 1946 | |
| VPB-199 | | | PV-2 | 2 November 1945 | |
| VPB-200 | | | | 24 October 1945 | |
| VPB-202 | | Leeman's Demons | PBM-3D | 20 June 1945 | |
| VPB-203 | | | PBM-3S | 30 June 1945 | |
| VPB-204 | | | | | redesignated VP-204 on 15 May 1946 |
| VPB-206 | | | PBM-3S | 4 June 1945 | |
| VPB-207 | | | PBM-3S | 26 June 1945 | |
| VPB-208 | | | | | redesignated VP-208 on 15 May 1946 |
| VPB-209 | | | PBM-3S | 20 June 1945 | |
| VPB-210 | | | PBM-3S | 10 July 1945 | |
| VPB-211 | | | PBM-3S | 14 June 1945 | |
| VPB-212 | | | PBM-5E | 15 May 1946 | |
| VPB-213 | | | PBM-3S | 10 July 1945 | |
| VPB-214 | | | PBM-3S | 21 June 1945 | |
| VPB-215 | | | PBM-3S | 28 May 1945 | |
| VPB-216 | | | PBM-3D | 7 April 1945 | |
| VA(HM)-10 | | | | | redesignated VP-17 on 1 July 1959 |
| VA-HM-13 | | | | | redesignated VP-24 on 1 July 1959 |
| VP-AM-1 | | | PBY-6A | 5 May 1948 | |
| VP-AM-2 | | | | | redesignated VP-32 on 1 September 1948 |
| VP-AM-3 | | | | | redesignated VP-33 on 1 September 1948 |
| VP-AM-4 | | | | | redesignated VP-34 on 1 September 1948 |
| VP-AM-5 | | | PBY-5A | 31 December 1947 | |
| VP-HL-1 | | | PB4Y-2 | 22 May 1947 | |
| VP-HL-2 | | | | | redesignated VP-22 on 1 September 1948 |
| VP-HL-3 | | | PB4Y-2 | 22 May 1947 | |
| VP-HL-4 | | | | | redesignated VP-24 on 1 September 1948 |
| VP-HL-5 | | | PB4Y-2 | 27 May 1947 | |
| VP-HL-7 | | | | | redesignated VP-27 on 1 September 1948 |
| VP-HL-8 | | | | | redesignated VP-28 on 1 September 1948 |
| VP-HL-9 | | | | | redesignated VP-ML-7 on 25 June 1947 |
| VP-HL-10 | | | | | redesignated VP-20 on 1 September 1948 |
| VP-HL-11 | | | | | redesignated VP-21 on 1 September 1948 |
| VP-HL-12 | | | | | redesignated VP-29 on 1 September 1948 |
| VP-HL-13 | | | | | redesignated VP-25 on 1 September 1948 |
| VP-MAU | | Rolling Thunder | P-3 | 17 August 1991 | USNR NAS Moffett Field |
| VP-ML-2 | | | | | redesignated VP-2 on 1 September 1948 |
| VP-ML-3 | | | | | redesignated VP-3 on 1 September 1948 |
| VP-ML-6 | | | | | redesignated VP-6 on 1 September 1948 |
| VP-ML-7 | | | | | redesignated VP-7 on 1 September 1948 |
| VP-ML-55 | | | | | redesignated VP-731 in February 1950 |
| VP-ML-57 | | | | | redesignated VP-871 in February 1950 |
| VP-ML-61 | | | | | redesignated VP-812 in February 1950 |
| VP-ML-64 | | | | | redesignated VP-861 in February 1950 |
| VP-ML-66 | | | | | redesignated VP-772 in February 1950 |
| VP-ML-67 | | | | | redesignated VP-892 in February 1950 |
| VP-ML-71 | | | | | redesignated VP-661 in February 1950 |
| VP-MS-2 | | | | | redesignated VP-42 on 1 September 1948 |
| VP-MS-3 | | | | | redesignated VP-43 on 1 September 1948 |
| VP-MS-4 | | | | | redesignated VP-44 on 1 September 1948 |
| VP-MS-8 | | | | | redesignated VP-48 on 1 September 1948 |
| VP-MS-9 | | | | | redesignated VP-49 on 1 September 1948 |
| VP-MS-10 | | | | | redesignated VP-40 on 1 September 1948 |
| VP-MS-11 | | | | | redesignated VP-41 on 1 September 1948 |
| VPW-1 | | | | | redesignated VP-51 on 1 September 1948 |
| VB-101 | | | | | redesignated VPB-101 on 1 October 1944 |
| VB-102 | | | | | redesignated VPB-102 on 1 October 1944 |
| VB-103 | | | | | redesignated VPB-103 on 1 October 1944 |
| VB-104 | | | | | redesignated VPB-104 on 1 October 1944 |
| VB-105 | | | | | redesignated VPB-105 on 1 October 1944 |
| VB-106 | | | | | redesignated VPB-106 on 1 October 1944 |
| VB-107 | | | | | redesignated VPB-107 on 1 October 1944 |
| VB-108 | | | | | redesignated VPB-108 on 1 October 1944 |
| VB-109 | | | | | redesignated VPB-109 on 1 October 1944 |
| VB-110 | | | | | redesignated VPB-110 on 1 October 1944 |
| VB-111 | | | | | redesignated VPB-111 on 1 October 1944 |
| VB-112 | | | | | redesignated VPB-112 on 1 October 1944 |
| VB-113 | | | | | redesignated VPB-113 on 1 October 1944 |
| VB-115 | | | | | redesignated VPB-115 on 1 October 1944 |
| VB-116 | | | | | redesignated VPB-116 on 1 October 1944 |
| VB-117 | | | | | redesignated VPB-117 on 1 October 1944 |
| VB-118 | | | | | redesignated VPB-118 on 1 October 1944 |
| VB-119 | | | | | redesignated VPB-119 on 1 October 1944 |
| VB-125 | | | | | redesignated VPB-125 on 1 October 1944 |
| VB-126 | | | | | redesignated VPB-126 on 1 October 1944 |
| VB-127 | | | | | redesignated VPB-127 on 1 October 1944 |
| VB-129 | | | | | redesignated VPB-129 on 1 October 1944 |
| VB-130 | | | | | redesignated VPB-130 on 1 October 1944 |
| VB-131 | | | | | redesignated VPB-131 on 1 October 1944 |
| VB-132 | | | | | redesignated VPB-132 on 1 October 1944 |
| VB-133 | | | | | redesignated VPB-133 on 1 October 1944 |
| VB-134 | | | | | redesignated VPB-134 on 1 October 1944 |
| VB-136 | | | | | redesignated VPB-136 on 1 October 1944 |
| VB-137 | | | | | redesignated VPB-137 on 1 October 1944 |
| VB-138 | | | | | redesignated VPB-138 on 1 October 1944 |
| VB-139 | | | | | redesignated VPB-139 on 1 October 1944 |
| VB-140 | | | | | redesignated VPB-140 on 1 October 1944 |
| VB-141 | | | | | redesignated VPB-141 on 1 October 1944 |
| VB-142 | | | | | redesignated VPB-142 on 1 October 1944 |
| VB-143 | | | | | redesignated VPB-143 on 1 October 1944 |
| VB-145 | | | | | redesignated VPB-145 on 1 October 1944 |
| VB-146 | | | | | redesignated VPB-146 on 1 October 1944 |
| VB-147 | | | | | redesignated VPB-147 on 1 October 1944 |
| VB-148 | | | | | redesignated VPB-148 on 1 October 1944 |
| VB-149 | | | | | redesignated VPB-149 on 1 October 1944 |
| VB-150 | | | | | redesignated VPB-150 on 1 October 1944 |
| VB-151 | | | | | redesignated VPB-151 on 1 October 1944 |
| VB-152 | | | | | redesignated VPB-152 on 1 October 1944 |
| VB-153 | | | | | redesignated VPB-153 on 1 October 1944 |
| VB-198 | | | | | redesignated VPB-198 on 1 October 1944 |
| VB-200 | | | | | redesignated VPB-200 on 1 October 1944 |

| Squadron Designation | Insignia | Nickname | Aircraft | Deactivated | Notes |
|---|---|---|---|---|---|
| VP-64 | | Condors | Lockheed P-3 Orion | N/A, still exists as VR-64 | USNR; Established 1 November 1970, redesignated VR-64 on 18 September 2004. NAS Willow Grove |
| VP-65 | | Tridents | Lockheed P-3 Orion | 31 March 2006 | USNR; Established 16 November 1970. NAS Point Mugu |
| VP-66 | | Liberty Bells | Lockheed P-3 Orion | 31 March 2006 | USNR; Established 1 November 1970. NAS Willow Grove |
| VP-91 (1970–99) | | Black Cats | Lockheed P-3 Orion | 31 March 1999 | USNR; Established 1 November 1970. NAS Moffett Field |
| VP-92 (1970–2007) | | Minutemen | Lockheed P-3 Orion | 30 November 2007 | USNR; Established 1 November 1970. NAS Brunswick |
| VP-94 (1970–2006) | | Crawfishers | Lockheed P-3 Orion | 31 March 2006 | USNR; Established 1 November 1970. NAS New Orleans |
| VPU-1 | | Old Buzzards | Lockheed P-3 Orion | 27 April 2012 | Established 1 July 1982 as "Patrol Squadron Special Project Unit ONE (VPU-1)", redesignated "Special Projects Patrol Squadron ONE (VPU-1)" 1 April 1998. |

== Attack squadrons ==
Attack squadrons first appeared in 1946 when the remaining WWII Bombing (VB) and Torpedo (VT) squadrons were redesignated Attack (VA) squadrons. Attack squadrons are those with a primary role of attacking enemy ships or targets ashore. From the creation of Carrier Air Groups it has been Attack squadrons (first as VB and VT squadrons) along with Fighter squadrons that formed the nucleus of the Carrier Air Group. From the late 1940s through the decade of the 1950s there were specialized "All Weather" attack squadrons which were equipped with early radar equipped attack aircraft and until the mid-1960s "Heavy Attack" squadrons were tasked with the strategic nuclear bombing mission. During the Vietnam war a specialized "Light Attack" squadron was established to support riverine and naval special warfare forces. The VA designation disappeared in the mid 90s having been replaced with the "Strike Fighter" (VFA) designation which combines the Fighter and Attack functions into one squadron type.

=== (VA) Attack squadrons ===
Several changes to designations were made on 15 November 1946. First, the Bombing (VB) and Torpedo (VT) designations were retired; all such squadrons were redesignated Attack squadrons (VA).

Second, the Carrier Air Group designation (CVG) was modified to identify the type of aircraft carrier to which the group was assigned. Henceforth, CVAGs were assigned to Essex-class carriers (sometimes called "Attack" carriers) and CVBGs were assigned to the large Midway-class carriers (sometimes called "Battle" carriers). Two designations from World War II survived: CVLGs (light carrier air group) were assigned to "light" Independence- or Saipan-class carriers, and CVEGs (escort carrier air group) to remaining small WWII escort carriers.

Third, and similarly, aircraft squadron designations were appended with an "A", "B", "L", or "E" to denote the type of Carrier Air Group the squadron was assigned. CVAGs and CVBGs were designated with odd numbers; each was assigned two VA squadrons; the first carried the Air Group's number; the second, the Air Group number plus one (CVAG-1: VA-1A, VA-2A; CVBG-1: VA-1B, VA-2B; CVAG-7: VA-7A, VA-8A; CVAG-11; VA-11A, VA-12A etc...)

The rules governing the squadron designation system changed twice between 1946 and 1996, when the last Attack squadron switched to the F/A-18 Hornet and was redesignated a Strike Fighter (VFA) squadron.

The list below is not a list of disestablished squadrons; it is a list of squadron designations that are no longer in use. Many squadrons carried multiple designations over the years; some were both VA and VF at various times. Sometimes a single squadron was redesignated several times; sometimes a given designation was assigned to several distinct squadrons. Most of the squadron designations in the list belonged to squadrons which have been disestablished, but also included are former designations of some VFA squadrons which are still active.

| Designation | Insignia | Nickname | Aircraft | Establishment and Redesignation | Disestablished as (or current designation) | Disestablished (or Deactivated) Date | Notes |
|---|---|---|---|---|---|---|---|
| VA-1A | | Top Hatters | SB2C; F4U | VB-2B: 1 Jul 1934-1 Jul 1937; VB-3: 1 Jul 1937-1 Jul 1939; VB-4: 1 Jul 1939-15 Mar 1941; VS-41: 15 Mar 1941-1 Mar 1943; VB-41: 1 Mar 1943-4 Aug 1943; VB-4: 4 Aug 1943-15 Nov 1946; VA-1A: 15 Nov 1946 – 2 Aug 1948; VA-14: 2 Aug 1948-15 Dec 1949; VF-14(2nd): 15 Dec 1949-1 Dec 2001; VFA-14: 1 Dec 2001–present | VFA-14 | Not applicable, still exists | Oldest continuously active aircraft squadron in the U.S. Navy; 1st VA squadron of CVAG-1 |
| VA-1B | | unknown | SB2C; AD | VB-74: 1 May 1945-15 Nov 1946; VA-1B: 15 Nov 1946 – 1 Sep 1948; VA-24: 1 Sep 1948-1 Dec 1949; VF-24(2nd): 1 Dec 1949-9 Mar 1959; VF-211(3rd): 9 Mar 1959-Aug 2006; VFA-211: Aug 2006–present | VFA-211 | Not applicable, still exists | 1st VA squadron of CVBG-1 |
| VA-1E | | unknown | TBM | VT-41: 26 Mar 1946-15 Nov 1946; VA-1E: 15 Nov 1946 – 1 Sep 1948 | VA-1E | 1 September 1948 | Only VA squadron of CVEG-1. CVEG-1 (composed of VF-1E and VA-1E) was redesignated Composite Squadron 21 (VC-21) on 1 September 1948 |
| VA-1L | | unknown | TBM; XTB2D; AD | VT-58: 19 Mar 1946-15 Nov 1946; VA-1L: 15 Nov 1946 – 20 Nov 1948 | VA-1L | 20 November 1948 | Only VA squadron of CVLG-1. Assets merged with VF-1L to form the first squadron designated VX-3 |
| VA-2A | | unknown | TBM | VT-4: 10 Jan 1942-15 Nov 1946; VA-2A: 15 Nov 1946 – 2 Aug 1948; VA-15(1st): 2 Aug 1948 – 1 Jun 1969 | VA-15 (1st) | 1 June 1969 | 2nd VA squadron of CVAG-1 |
| VA-2B | | unknown | SB2C, SBW; TBM; SNJ; AD | VT-74: 1 May 1945-15 Nov 1946; VA-2B: 15 Nov 1946 – 1 Sep 1948; VA-25(1st): 1 Sep 1948-1 Jul 1959; VA-65(2nd): 1 Jul 1959 – 31 Mar 1993 | VA-65 (2nd) | 31 March 1993 | 2nd VA squadron of CVBG-1 |
| VA-2E | | unknown | TBM | VT-42: 19 Jul 1945-15 Nov 1946; VA-2E: 15 Nov 1946 – 1 Sep 1948; VC-22(2nd): 1 Sep 1948-20 Apr 1950 (same sqdn listed in VC section); VS-22(1st): 20 Apr 1950-1 Jun 1956 (same sqdn listed in VS section) | VS-22 (2nd) | 1 June 1956 | Only VA squadron of CVEG-2 |
| VA-3A | | Black Panthers | SB2C; AD | VB-3B: 1 Jul 1934-1 Jul 1937; VB-4: 1 Jul 1937-1 Jul 1939; VB-3: 1 Jul 1939-15 Nov 1946; VA-3A: 15 Nov 1946 – 7 Aug 1948; VA-34(1st): 7 Aug 1948-15 Feb 1950; VA-35(2nd): 15 Feb 1950 – 31 Jan 1995 | VA-35 (2nd) | 31 January 1995 | 1st VA squadron of CVAG-3. The "diving panther" insignia was created by VB-3B and remained in use through the entire life of the squadron through all of its redesignations. |
| VA-3B | | unknown | SB2C; AD | VB-75: 1 Jun 1945-15 Nov 1946; VA-3B: 15 Nov 1946 – 1 Sep 1948; VA-44(1st): 1 Sep 1948 – 8 Jun 1950 | VA-44 (1st) | 8 June 1950 | 1st VA squadron of CVBG-3 |
| VA-3E | | unknown | TBM | VA-3E: 21 Apr 1947 – 1 Sep 1948; VC-23(2nd): 1 Sep 1948-23 Apr 1950 (same sqdn listed in VC section); VS-23: 23 Apr 1959-27 Sep 1968 (same sqdn listed in VS section) | VS-23 | 27 September 1968 | Only VA squadron of CVEG-3 |
| VA-4A | | Dragons | TBM | VT-2: 1925-1 Jul 1927; VT-2B: 1 Jul 1927- 1 Jul 1937; VT-3: 1 Jul 1937-15 Nov 1946; VA-4A: 15 Nov 1946 – 7 Aug 1948; VA-35(1st): 7 Aug 1948 – 7 Nov 1949 | VA-35 (1st) | 7 November 1949 | 2nd VA squadron of CVAG-3 |
| VA-4B | | Fish Hawks | SB2C; AD | VT-75: 1 Jun 1945-15 Nov 1946; VA-4B: 15 Nov 1946 – 1 Sep 1948; VA-45(1st): 1 Sep 1948 – 8 Jun 1950 | VA-45 (1st) | 8 June 1950 | 2nd VA squadron of CVBG-3 |
| VA-5A | | unknown | SB2C; F4U | VS-2B: 3 Jul 1928-1 Jul 1937 (VS = "Scouting Squadron"); VS-3: 1 Jul 1937-1 Mar 1943; VB-4: 1 Mar 1943-15 Jul 1943; VB-5: 15 Jul 1943-15 Nov 1946; VA-5A: 15 Nov 1946 – 16 Aug 1948; VA-54(1st): 16 Aug 1948 – 1 Dec 1949 | VA-54 (1st) | 1 December 1949 | 1st VA squadron of CVAG-5 |
| VA-5B | | unknown | SB2C; AD | VB-17: 1 Jan 1943-15 Nov 1946; VA-5B: 15 Nov 1946 – 27 Jul 1948; VA-64(1st): 27 Jul 1948-8 Apr 1949; VC-24(2nd): 8 Apr 1949-20 Apr 1950 (same sqdn listed in VC section); VS-24(1st): 20 Apr 1950-1 Jun 1956 (same sqdn listed in VS section) | VS-24 (1st) | 1 June 1956 | 1st VA squadron of CVBG-5 |
| VA-6A | | Torpcats | TBM | VT-5: 15 Feb 1943-15 Nov 1946; VA-6A: 15 Nov 1946 – 16 Aug 1948; VA-55(1st): 16 Aug 1948 – 12 Dec 1975 | VA-55 (1st) | 19 December 1975 | 2nd VA squadron of CVAG-5 |
| VA-6B | | unknown | SB2C; AD | VT-17: 1 Jan 1943-15 Nov 1946; VA-6B: 15 Nov 1946 – 27 Jul 1948; VA-65(1st): 27 Jul 1948-1 Jul 1959; VA-25(2nd): 1 Jul 1959-1 Jul 1983; VFA-125: 1 Jul 1983–present | VFA-25 | Not applicable, still exists | 2nd VA squadron of CVBG-5 |
| VA-7A | | Sunday Punchers | SBW, SB2C; F4U | VB-18: 20 Jul 1943-15 Nov 1946; VA-7A: 15 Nov 1946 – 27 Jul 1948; VA-74: 27 Jul 1948-15 Feb 1950; VA-75(2nd): 15 Feb 1950 – 28 Feb 1997 | VA-75 (2nd) | 28 February 1997 | 1st VA squadron of CVAG-7 |
| VA-8A | | Air Barons | TBM | VT-18: 20 Jul 1943-15 Nov 1946; VA-8A: 15 Nov 1946 – 27 Jul 1948; VA-75(1st): 27 Jul 1948 – 30 Nov 1949 | VA-75 (1st) | 30 November 1949 | 2nd VA squadron of CVAG-7 |
| VA-9A | | unknown | SB2C | VB-99: 1 Jul 1943-15 Oct 1943; VB-20: 15 Oct 1943-15 Nov 1946; VA-9A: 15 Nov 1946 – 12 Aug 1948; VA-94(1st): 12 Aug 1948 – 31 Nov 1949 | VA-94 (1st) | 31 November 1949 | 1st VA squadron of CVAG-9 |
| VA-10A | | unknown | TBM | VT-20: 15 Oct 1943-15 Nov 1946; VA-10A: 15 Nov 1946 – 12 Aug 1948; VA-95(1st): 12 Aug 1948 – 30 Nov 1949 | VA-95 (1st) | 30 November 1949 | 2nd VA squadron of CVAG-9 |
| VA-11A | | unknown | SB2C | VB-11: 10 Oct 1942-15 Nov 1946; VA-11A: 15 Nov 1946 – 15 Jul 1948; VA-114: 15 Jul 1948 – 1 Dec 1949 | VA-114 | 1 December 1949 | 1st VA squadron of CVAG-11 |
| VA-12A | | unknown | TBM | VT-11: 10 Oct 1942-15 Nov 1946; VA-12A: 15 Nov 1946 – 15 Jul 1948; VA-115: 15 Jul 1948-30 Sep 1996; VFA-115: 30 Sep 1996–present | VFA-115 | Not applicable, still exists | 2nd VA squadron of CVAG-11 |
| VA-13A | | Hell Razors | SBW; F4U | VB-81: 1 Mar 1944-15 Nov 1946; VA-13A: 15 Nov 1946 – 2 Aug 1948; VA-134(1st): 2 Aug 1948-15 Feb 1950; VF-174: 15 Feb 1950-1 Jul 1966; VA-174(2nd): 1 Jul 1966 – 30 Jun 1988 | VA-174 (2nd) | 30 June 1988 | 1st VA squadron of CVAG-13 |
| VA-14A | | Uninvited | TBM | VT-81: 1 Mar 1944-15 Nov 1946; VA-14A: 15 Nov 1946 – 2 Aug 1948; VA-135(1st): 2 Aug 1948 – 30 Nov 1949 | VA-135 (1st) | 30 November 1949 | 2nd VA squadron of CVAG-13 |
| VA-15A | | Flying Cannons | SB2C | VB-153: 26 Mar 1945-15 Nov 1946; VA-15A: 15 Nov 1946 – 15 Jul 1948; VA-154: 15 Jul 1948 – 1 Dec 1949 | VA-154 | 1 December 1949 | 1st VA squadron of CVAG-15 |
| VA-16A | | unknown | TBM | VT-153: 26 Mar 1945-15 Nov 1946; VA-16A: 15 Nov 1946 – 15 Jul 1948; VA-155(1st): 15 Jul 1948 – 30 Nov 1949 | VA-155 (1st) | 30 November 1949 | 2nd VA squadron of CVAG-15 |
| VA-17A | | Battering Rams | SBW; AM | VB-82: 1 Apr 1944-15 Nov 1946; VA-17A: 15 Nov 1946 – 11 Aug 1948; VA-174: 11 Aug 1948 – 25 Jan 1950 | VA-174 | 25 January 1950 | 1st VA squadron of CVAG-17 |
| VA-18A | | Devils Diplomats | TBM | VT-82: 1 Apr 1944-15 Nov 1946; VA-18A: 15 Nov 1946 – 11 Aug 1948; VA-175: 11 Aug 1948 – 15 Mar 1958 | VA-175 | 15 March 1958 | 2nd VA squadron of CVAG-17 |
| VA-19A | | unknown | SB2C; AD | VB-19: 15 Aug 1943-15 Nov 1946; VA-19A: 15 Nov 1946 – 15 Aug 1948; VA-194: 24 Aug 1948 – 1 Dec 1949 | VA-194 | 1 December 1949 | 1st VA squadron of CVAG-19 |
| VA-20A | | unknown | TBM; AD | VT-19: 15 Aug 1943-15 Nov 1946; VA-20A: 15 Nov 1946 – 24 Aug 1948; VA-195: 24 Aug 1948-15 Apr 1985; VFA-195: 15 Apr 1985–present | VFA-195 | Not applicable, still exists | 2nd VA squadron of CVAG-19 |
| VA-21A | | unknown | SB2C | VB-98: 28 Aug 1944-15 Nov 1946; VA-21A: 15 Nov 1946 – 5 Aug 1947 | VA-21A | 5 August 1947 | 1st VA squadron of CVAG-21 |
| VA-22A | | unknown | TBM | VT-98: 28 Aug 1944-15 Nov 1946; VA-22A: 15 Nov 1946 – 5 Aug 1947 | VA-22A | 5 August 1947 | 2nd VA squadron of CVAG-21 |
A new Squadron and Air Group designation scheme was established in 1948. CVAGs and CVBGs were all redesignated CVGs, CVLGs and CVEGs were disestablished, and squadron suffix letters were eliminated. New squadron designation numbers denoted to which CVG the squadron was assigned with the first one or two digits identifying the CVG followed by a 4 or 5 to differentiate between the two VA squadrons of each CVG. (Note: There were initially three VF squadrons in each CVG numbered with 1, 2 and 3 and two VA squadrons numbered with 4 and 5, therefore CVG-1's VA squadrons were VA-14 and VA-15; CVG-2's were VA-24 and VA-25; CVG-11's were VA-114 and VA-115; CVG-15's were VA-154 and VA-155 etc... When a squadron was moved from one CVG to another it was redesignated to conform with the designation of the newly assigned CVG. From 1951 to 1959 the Navy operated a number of Air Task Groups (ATG)s which were usually equipped by removing one squadron each from a number of then typical five VF/VA squadron CVGs leaving those CVGs at four VF/VA squadrons. Squadrons retained their former CVG's designation when assigned to an ATG. In some cases squadrons were established and assigned directly to an ATG, in those cases the squadron was typically assigned a designation as if assigned to one of the existing CVGs but with the last digit of the designation greater than "5". Squadrons and CVGs are grouped by designation below for ease of reading the table but it should not be assumed that the listed squadrons were assigned only to the CVG in which section they appear in the table as ATG assignment did not occasion a redesignation, and by the late 1950s the practice of redesignating squadrons upon transfer between CVGs had begun to be abandoned with squadrons being redesignated in some cases but not in others.)
CVG-1 (2nd): CVAG-1 redesignated CVG-1 (2nd) 1 Sep 1948, currently exists as CVW-1
| VA-12 | | Ubangis, Clinchers (1982) | F2H; F7U; AD4/A-4; A-7 | VBF-4: 12 May 1945-15 Nov 1946; VF-2A: 15 Nov 1946-2 Aug 1948; VF-12: 2 Aug 1948-1 Aug 1955; VA-12: 1 Aug 1955 – 1 Oct 1986 | VA-12 | 1 October 1986 | CVG-1(2nd) VF squadron redesignated as a CVG-1(2nd) VA squadron. |
| VA-14 | | Top Hatters | F4U | Air Det Pac Flt: Sep 1919-15 Jun 1920; VT-5(1st): 15 Jun 1920-7 Sep 1921; VP-1-4: 7 Dec 1921-23 Sep 1921; VF-4(1st): 23 Sep 1921-1 Jul 1922; VF-1(1st): 1 Jul 1922-1 Jul 1927; VF-1B(1st): 1 Jul 1927-1 Jul 1934; VB-2B: 1 Jul 1934-1 Jul 1937; VB-3: 1 Jul 1937-1 Jul 1939; VB-4: 1 Jul 1939-15 Mar 1941; VS-41(2nd): 15 Mar 1941-1 Mar 1943; VB-41: 1 Mar 1943-4 Aug 1943; VB-4: 4 Aug 1943-15 Nov 1946; VA-1A: 15 Nov 1946-2 Aug 1948; VA-14: 2 Aug 1948 – 15 Dec 1949; VF-14(2nd): 15 Dec 1949-1 Dec 2001; VFA-14: 1 Dec 2001–present | VFA-14 | Not applicable, still exists | Oldest continuously active aircraft squadron in the U.S. Navy. Redesignated as one of CVG-1(2nd)'s initial squadrons |
| VA-15 (First use) | (1951) | Valions (mid 1950s) | TBM; AD/A-1; A-4 | VT-4: 10 Jan 1942-15 Nov 1946; VA-2A: 15 Nov 1946-2 Aug 1948; VA-15(1st): 2 Aug 1948 – 1 Jun 1969 | VA-15 (1st) | 1 June 1969 | Redesignated as one of CVG-1(2nd)'s initial squadrons |
| VA-16 | | unknown | AD | VA-16: 1 Jun 1955 – 1 Mar 1958 | VA-16 | 1 March 1958 | Established and assigned to Air Task Group 182 (ATG-182) |
CVG-2 (2nd): CVBG-1 redesignated CVG-2 (2nd) 1 Sep 1948, currently exists as CVW-2
| VA-22 | | Fighting Redcocks | FJ-4; A4D/A-4; A-7 | VF-63: 28 Jul 1948-Mar 1956; VA-63: Mar 1956-1 Jul 1959; VA-22: 1 Jul 1959-4 May 1990; VFA-22: 4 May 1990 – present | VFA-22 | Not applicable, still exists | VF-63 had been transferred to CVG-2(2nd) in 1950 without being redesignated. Was redesignated a VA squadron retaining the 63 designation while still in CVG-2(2nd). Was ultimately redesignated VA-22 in 1959 to conform with the CVG designation |
| VA-23 | | Black Knights | FJ-4; A4D/A-4 | VF-653 (USNR): 1 Feb 1951-4 Feb 1953; VF-151(3rd): 4 Feb 1953-7 Feb 1956; VA-151: 7 Feb 1956-23 Feb 1959; VA-23: 23 Feb 1959 – 1 Apr 1970 | VA-23 | 1 April 1970 | VA-151 reassigned to CVG-2(2nd) and redesignated VA-23 |
| VA-24 | | unknown | AD; F4U | VB-74: 1 May 1945-15 Nov 1946; VA-1B: 15 Nov 1946-1 Sep 1948; VA-24: 1 Sep 1948 – 1 Dec 1949; VF-24(2nd): 1 Dec 1949-9 Mar 1959; VF-211(3rd): 9 Mar 1959-Aug 2006; VFA-211: Aug 2006–present | VFA-211 | Not applicable, still exists | Redesignated as one of CVG-2 initial squadrons |
| VA-25 (First use) | (1950) | Tigers (1950) | SNJ; AD/A-1 | VT-74: 1 May 1945-15 Nov 1946; VA-2B: 15 Nov 1946-1 Sep 1948; VA-25(1st): 1 Sep 1948 – 1 Jul 1959; VA-65(2nd): 1 Jul 1959 – 31 Mar 1993 | VA-65 (2nd) | 31 March 1993 | Redesignated as one of CVG-2(2nd)'s initial squadrons. Reassigned to CVG-6 in 1950 without being redesignated until 1959 |
| VA-25 (Second use) | (1974) | Fist of the Fleet | AD/A-1; A-7 | VT-17: 1 Jan 1943-15 Nov 1946; VA-6B: 15 Nov 1946-27 Jul 1948; VA-65(1st): 27 Jul 1948-1 Jul 1959; VA-25(2nd): 1 Jul 1959 – 1 Jul 1983; VFA-125: 1 Jul 1983–present | VFA-25 | Not applicable, still exists | VA-65(1st) reassigned to CVG-2(2nd) in 1950 without being redesignated until 1959 |
| VA-26 | | Skylancers | F9F-8 | VA-26: 30 Jun 1956 – 11 Apr 1958; VA-125(2nd): 11 Apr 1958 – 1 Oct 1977 | VA-125 (2nd) | 11 April 1977 | Established and assigned to Air Task Group THREE (ATG-3) until its redesignation to VA-125 and reassignment to RCVG-12 |
CVG-3 (2nd): CVAG-3 redesignated CVG-3 (2nd) 1 Sep 1948, currently exists as CVW-3
| VA-34 (First use) | | Black Panthers | AD/A-1 | VB-3B: 1 Jul 1934-1 Jul 1937; VB-4: 1 Jul 1937-1 Jul 1939; VB-3: 1 Jul 1939-15 Nov 1946; VA-3A: 15 Nov 1946-7 Aug 1948; VA-34(1st): 7 Aug 1948 – 15 Feb 1950; VA-35(2nd): 15 Feb 1950 – 31 Jan 1995 | VA-35 (2nd) | 31 January 1995 | Redesignated as one of CVG-3(2nd)'s initial squadrons. The "diving panther" insignia was created by VB-3B and remained in use through the entire life of the squadron through all of its redesignations. |
| VA-34 (1943–69) (Second use) | | Blue Blasters | F2H; F7U; A4D/A-4 | VF-20: 15 Oct 1943-15 Nov 1946; VF-9A: 15 Nov 1946-12 Aug 1948; VF-91(1st): 12 Aug 1948-15 Feb 1950; VF-34(3rd): 15 Feb 1950-1 Jul 1955; VA-34(2nd): 1 Jul 1955 – 1 Jun 1969 | VA-34 (2nd) | 1 June 1969 | VF-34(3rd) returned to CVG-3(2nd) from Air Task Group 181 (ATG-181) and redesignated a VA squadron |
| VA-35 (First use) | | Dragons | TBM; AD | VT-2: 1925-1 Jul 1927; VT-2B: 1 Jul 1927- 1 Jul 1937; VT-3: 1 Jul 1937-15 Nov 1946; VA-4A: 15 Nov 1946-7 Aug 1948; VA-35(1st): 7 Aug 1948 – 7 Nov 1949 | VA-35 (1st) | 7 November 1949 | Redesignated as one of CVG-3(2nd)'s initial squadrons |
| VA-35 (Second use) | | Black Panthers | A-1; A-6, KA-6 | VB-3B: 1 Jul 1934-1 Jul 1937; VB-4: 1 Jul 1937-1 Jul 1939; VB-3: 1 Jul 1939-15 Nov 1946; VA-3A: 15 Nov 1946-7 Aug 1948; VA-34(1st): 7 Aug 1948-15 Feb 1950; VA-35(2nd): 15 Feb 1950 – 31 Jan 1995 | VA-35 (2nd) | 31 January 1995 | VA-34(1st) redesignated VA-35(2nd) when VF-91(1st) was reassigned to CVG-3(2nd) as the group's fourth VF squadron VF-34(3rd) on 15 Feb 1950. The "diving panther" insignia was created by VB-3B and remained in use through the entire life of the squadron through all of its redesignations. |
| VA-36 (First use) | | Roadrunners | F9F-5; F9F-8; A4D/A-4 | VF-102(1st): 1 May 1952-1 Jul 1955; VA-36(1st): 1 Jul 1955 – 1 Aug 1970 | VA-36 (1st) | 1 August 1970 | VF-201 redesignated VA-36 and assigned to Air Task Group 201 (ATG-201). Ultimately assigned to CVG-3(2nd) in 1958 |
CVG-4 (2nd): CVBG-1 redesignated CVG-4 (2nd) 1 Sep 1948, disestablished 8 Jun 1950
| VA-44 (First use) | | unknown | AD; AM | VB-75: 1 Jun 1945-15 Nov 1946; VA-3B: 15 Nov 1946-1 Sep 1948; VA-44(1st): 1 Sep 1948 – 8 Jun 1950 | VA-44 (1st) | 8 June 1950 | Redesignated as one of CVG-4(2nd)'s initial squadrons |
| VA-45 (First use) | | Black Knights | AD; AM | VT-75: 1 Jun 1945-15 Nov 1946; VA-4B: 15 Nov 1946-1 Sep 1948; VA-45(1st): 1 Sep 1948 – 8 Jun 1950 | VA-45 (1st) | 8 June 1950 | Redesignated as one of CVG-4(2nd)'s initial squadrons |
CVG-4 (3rd): Established 1 Sep 1950, redesignated RCVG-4 on 1 Apr 1958 to control FRSs, disestablished 1 Jun 1970 as RCVW-4
| VA-45 (Second use) | | Blackbirds | AD | VA-45 : 1 Sep 1950 – 1 Mar 1958 | VA-45 (2nd) | 1 March 1958 | Established as one of CVG-4 initial squadrons. CVG-4 initially had four VF squadrons and only this single initial VA squadron. Was disestablished when CVG-4 was redesignated RCVG-4 |
| VA-46 | | Clansmen (1960) | F9F-5; F9F-8; A4D/A-4; A-7E | VA-46: 25 May 1955 – 30 Jun 1991 | VA-46 | 30 June 1991 | Assigned to CVG-4(3rd) upon establishment but reassigned to Air Task Group 202 (ATG-202) two months later and never returned to CVG-4(3rd) |
RCVG-4 / RCVW-4 Fleet Replacement Squadrons
| VA-42 | (1992) | Green Pawns, Thunderbolts (1992) | AD; North American T-28 Trojan; Grumman TC-4C; Grumman A-6, KA-6 | VF-42(4th): 1 Sep 1950-1 Nov 1953; VA-42: 1 Nov 1953 – 30 Sep 1994 | VA-42 | 30 September 1994 | VF-42 assigned to CVG-6(2nd) at the time redesignated a VA squadron in 1953. Transitioned from an operational VA squadron to an AD Sky Raider FRS on 24 Oct 1958 and reassigned to RCVG-4. Later became an A-6 FRS. Adopted "Thunderbolts" name and insignia from VA-176 when it was disestablished in 1992 |
| VA-43 | | Challengers | A4D/A-4 | VF-74A: 1 May 1945-1 Aug 1945; VF-74(2nd): 1 Aug 1945-15 Nov 1946; VF-1B(3rd): 15 Nov 1946-1 Sep 1948; VF-21(2nd): 1 Sep 1948-1 Jul 1959; VA-43: 1 Jul 1959 – 1 Jun 1973; VF-43(5th): 1 Jun 1973 – 1 Jul 1994 | VF-43 (5th) | 1 July 1994 | VF-21 redesignated as an A4D Skyhawk FRS and assigned to RCVG-4 |
| VA-44 (Second use) | | Hornets | F2H; F9F-8; F9F-8T/TF-9; TV-2; T-28; A4D/A-4, TA-4; AD/A-1 | VF-44(2nd): 1 Sep 1950-1 Jan 1956; VA-44(2nd): 1 Jan 1956 – 1 May 1970 | VA-44 (2nd) | 1 May 1970 | CVG-4(3rd)'s VF-44 redesignated a VA squadron in 1956. Transitioned from an operational VA squadron of CVG-4(3rd) to an A4D Skyhawk FRS on 1 Jun 1958 in conjunction with CVG-4(3rd)'s redesignation to RCVG-4. In 1959 AD Sky Raider training was added and the squadron operated as both an A4D (A-4 in Sep 1962) and an AD (A-1 in Sep 1962) FRS. "Split out" VA-45(3rd) in 1963 to continue A-1 training and became solely an A-4 FRS |
| VA-45 (1963–96) (Third use) | | Blackbirds | A-1; A-4 | VA-45(3rd): 15 Feb 1963 – 7 Feb 1985; VF-45(2nd): 7 Feb 1985 – 31 Mar 1996 | VF-45 (2nd) | 31 March 1996 | Adopted both the "Blackbirds" name and the insignia of the disestablished VA-45(2nd). Established as an A-1 Sky Raider FRS and assigned to RCVG-4 (was "split out of" VA-44(2nd) to continue A-1 training to allow VA-44(2nd) to become solely an A-4 FRS). After the A-1's retirement the squadron provided A-4 detachments to ASW air groups and later assumed an adversary role in support of Air Combat Maneuvering training |
CVG-5 (2nd): CVAG-5 redesignated CVG-5 (2nd) 1 Sep 1948, currently exists as CVW-5
| VA-52 | | Knightriders | AD/A-1; A-6, KA-6 | VF-884: 20 Jul 1950-4 Feb 1953; VF-144: 4 Feb 1953-23 Feb 1959; VA-52: 23 Feb 1959 – 31 Mar 1995 | VA-52 | 31 March 1995 | VF-144 was redesignated a VA squadron and reassigned to CVG-5(2nd) |
| VA-54 (First use) | | unknown | F4U; AD | VS-2B: 3 Jul 1928-1 Jul 1937 (VS = "Scouting Squadron"); VS-3: 1 Jul 1937-1 Mar 1943; VB-4: 1 Mar 1943-15 Jul 1943; VB-5: 15 Jul 1943-15 Nov 1946; VA-5A: 15 Nov 1946-16 Aug 1948; VA-54(1st): 16 Aug 1948 – 1 Dec 1949 | VA-54 (1st) | 1 December 1949 | Redesignated as one of CVG-5(2nd)'s initial squadrons |
| VA-54 (Second use) | | Hell's Angels | AD; F9F-8 | VBF-153: 26 Mar 1945-15 Nov 1946; VF-16A: 15 Nov 1946-15 Jul 1948; VF-152(2nd): 15 Jul 1948-15 Feb 1950; VF-54(1st): 15 Feb 1950-15 Jun 1956; VA-54(2nd): 15 Jun 1956 – 1 Apr 1958 | VA-54 (2nd) | 1 April 1958 | CVG-5(2nd) VF squadron redesignated a VA squadron |
| VA-55 (First use) | (1955) | Torpcats, Warhorses (1955) | TBM; AD; FJ-4; A4D/A-4 | VT-5: 15 Feb 1943-15 Nov 1946; VA-6A: 15 Nov 1946-16 Aug 1948; VA-55(1st): 16 Aug 1948 – 12 Dec 1975 | VA-55 (1st) | 19 December 1975 | Redesignated as one of CVG-5(2nd)'s initial squadrons |
| VA-56 | | Boomerangs, Champions (1958) | F9F-3; F9F-8; FJ-4; A4D/A-4; A-7 | VA-56: 4 Jun 1956 – 31 Aug 1986 | VA-56 | 31 August 1986 | Established as a CVG-5(2nd) VA squadron |
CVG-6 (2nd): CVBG-5 redesignated CVG-6 (2nd) 1 Sep 1948, disestablished 1 Apr 1992 as CVW-6
| VA-63 | | Fighting Redcocks | F9F-8; FJ-4 | VF-63: 28 Jul 1948-Mar 1956; VA-63: Mar 1956-1 Jul 1959; VA-22: 1 Jul 1959-4 May 1990; VFA-22: 4 May 1990 – present | VFA-22 | Not applicable, still exists | VF-63 had been transferred to CVG-2(2nd) in 1950 without being redesignated. Was redesignated a VA squadron retaining the 63 designation while still in CVG-2(2nd). Was ultimately redesignated VA-22 in 1959 to conform with the CVG designation |
| VA-64 (First use) | | unknown | AD | VB-17: 1 Jan 1943-15 Nov 1946; VA-5B: 15 Nov 1946-27 Jul 1948; VA-64(1st): 27 Jul 1948 – 8 Apr 1949; VC-24(2nd): 8 Apr 1949-20 Apr 1950 (same sqdn listed in VC section); VS-24(1st): 20 Apr 1950-1 Jun 1956 (same sqdn listed in VS section) | VS-24 (1st) | 1 June 1956 | Redesignated as one of CVG-6(2nd)'s initial squadrons |
| VA-64 (Second use) | | Black Lancers | A4D/A-4 | VA-64(2nd): 1 Jul 1961 – 7 Nov 1969 | VA-64 (2nd) | 7 November 1969 | Established as a CVG-6(2nd) VA squadron |
| VA-65 (First use) | (1949) | Fist of the Fleet (1949) | AD | VT-17: 1 Jan 1943-15 Nov 1946; VA-6B: 15 Nov 1946-27 Jul 1948; VA-65(1st): 27 Jul 1948 – 1 Jul 1959; VA-25(2nd): 1 Jul 1959-1 Jul 1983; VFA-125: 1 Jul 1983–present | VFA-25 | Not applicable, still exists | Redesignated as one of CVG-6(2nd)'s initial squadrons |
| VA-65 (Second use) | | Tigers | AD/A-1; A-6, KA-6 | VT-74: 1 May 1945-15 Nov 1946; VA-2B: 15 Nov 1946-1 Sep 1948; VA-25(1st): 1 Sep 1948-1 Jul 1959; VA-65(2nd): 1 Jul 1959 – 31 Mar 1993 | VA-65 (2nd) | 31 March 1993 | Replaced VA-65(1st) in CVG-6(2nd) when VA-65(1st) was moved to CVG-2(2nd) |
| VA-66 (First use) | | Crusaders | F9F-8 | VA-66(1st): 1 Jul 1955 – 1 Jul 1955; VF-81(4th): 1 Jul 1955-1 Jul 1959; VA-81: 1 Jul 1959-4 Feb 1988; VFA-81: 4 Feb 1988–present | VFA-81 | Not applicable, still exists | Established as VA-66(1st) but redesignated to VF-81(4th) on the same day and replaced VF-81(3rd) in CVG-8(2nd) |
| VA-66 (Second use) | | Waldomen | F7U; F9F-8; A4D/A-4; A-7 | VF-671: 1 Feb 1951-4 Feb 1953; VF-81(3rd): 4 Feb 1953-1 Jul 1955; VA-66(2nd): 1 Jul 1955 – 1 Oct 1986 | VA-66 (2nd) | 1 October 1986 | VF-81(3rd) which was assigned to CVG-8(2nd) was redesignated a VA squadron and reassigned to CVG-6(2nd) |
CVG-7 (2nd): CVAG-7 redesignated CVG-7 (2nd) 1 Sep 1948, still exists as CVW-7
| VA-72 | | Hawks, Blue Hawks (early 1960s) | F9F-5; A4D/A-4; A-7 | VBF-18: 25 Jan 1945-15 Nov 1946; VF-8A: 15 Nov 1946-28 Jul 1948; VF-72(2nd): 28 Jul 1948-3 Jan 1956; VA-72: 3 Jan 1956 – 30 Jun 1991 | VA-72 | 30 June 1991 | CVG-7(2nd) VF squadron redesignated a CVG-7(2nd) VA squadron |
| VA-74 | | Sunday Punchers | F4U; AD | VB-18: 20 Jul 1943-15 Nov 1946; VA-7A: 15 Nov 1946-27 Jul 1948; VA-74: 27 Jul 1948 – 15 Feb 1950; VA-75(2nd): 15 Feb 1950 – 28 Feb 1997 | VA-75 (2nd) | 28 February 1997 | Redesignated as one of CVG-7(2nd)'s initial squadrons |
| VA-75 (First use) | | Air Barons | TBM; AD | VT-18: 20 Jul 1943-15 Nov 1946; VA-8A: 15 Nov 1946-27 Jul 1948; VA-75(1st): 27 Jul 1948 – 30 Nov 1949 | VA-75 (1st) | 30 November 1949 | Redesignated as one of CVG-7(2nd)'s initial squadrons |
| VA-75 (Second use) | (after 1950) | Sunday Punchers | AD/A-1; A-6, KA-6 | VB-18: 20 Jul 1943-15 Nov 1946; VA-7A: 15 Nov 1946-27 Jul 1948; VA-74: 27 Jul 1948-15 Feb 1950; VA-75(2nd): 15 Feb 1950 – 28 Feb 1997 | VA-75 (2nd) | 28 February 1997 | CVG-7(2nd) VA-74 redesignated VA-75(2nd). Original insignia of VB-18 was re-adopated after 1950. |
| VA-76 | | Spirits | F2H; F9F-8; A4D/A-4 | VA-76: 1 Jun 1955 – 30 Sep 1969 | VA-76 | 30 September 1969 | Established and assigned to Air Task Group 182 (ATG-182). Was never assigned to CVG-7(2nd) |
CVG-8 (2nd): Planned for establishment in 1948 but cancelled
| VA-84 | | unknown | TBM; AM | VA-84: 15 Sep 1948 – 29 Nov 1949 | VA-84 | 29 November 1949 | Established for assignment to CVG-8(2nd) but CVG-8 establishment was cancelled and squadron was disestablished |
| VA-85 (First use) | | unknown | TBM; AM | VA-85(1st): 15 Sep 1948 – 29 Nov 1949 | VA-85 (1st) | 29 November 1949 | Established for assignment to CVG-8(2nd) but CVG-8 establishment was cancelled and squadron was disestablished |
CVG-8 (2nd): Established 9 Apr 1951 to receive USNR squadrons activated for the Korean War, still exists as CVW-8
| VA-81 | (1963) | Crusaders, Sunliners (1963) | A4D/A-4; A-7 | VA-66(1st): 1 Jul 1955-1 Jul 1955; VF-81(4th): 1 Jul 1955-1 Jul 1959; VA-81: 1 Jul 1959 – 4 Feb 1988; VFA-81: 4 Feb 1988–present | VFA-81 | Not applicable, still exists | CVG-8(2nd) VF squadron redesignated a CVG-8(2nd) VA squadron |
| VA-83 | (1957) | Roaring Bulls, Rampagers (1957) | F7U; A4D/A-4; A-7 | VF-916: 1 Feb 1951-4 Feb 1953; VF-83(3rd): 4 Feb 1953-1 Jul 1955; VA-83: 1 Jul 1955 – 3 Mar 1988; VFA-83: 3 Mar 1988–present | VFA-83 | Not applicable, still exists | CVG-8(2nd)'s VF-83 redesignated a CVG-8(2nd) VA squadron |
| VA-85 (Second use) | (1954) (1958) | Black Falcons (1958) | AD/A-1; A-6, KA-6 | VA-859 (USNR): not listed-4 Feb 1953; VA-85(2nd): 4 Feb 1953 – 30 Sep 1994 | VA-85 (2nd) | 30 September 1994 | USNR VA-859 establishment date not listed, activated 1 Feb 1951 for the Korean War and assigned to CVG-8(2nd) when it was established on 9 Apr. Permanently activated and redesignated VA-85(2nd) in 1953 |
| VA-86 (First use) | | Vagabonds | FJ-3 | VA-86(1st): 1 July 1955 – 1 Jul 1955; VF-84(3rd): 1 Jul 1955 – 1 Oct 1995 | VF-84 (3rd) | 1 October 1995 | Established as VA-86(1st) but redesignated to VF-84(3rd) on the same day |
| VA-86 (Second use) | | Sidewinders | F7U; A4D/A-4; A-7 | VF-921: 1 Feb 1951-4 Feb 1953; VF-84(2nd): 4 Feb 1953-1 Jul 1955; VA-86(2nd): 1 Jul 1955 – 15 Jul 1987; VFA-86: 15 Jul 1987–present | VFA-86 | Not applicable, still exists | VF-84 redesignated VA-86 and assigned to Air Task Group 181 (ATG-181) |
CVG-9 (2nd): CVAG-9 redesignated CVG-9 (2nd) 1 Sep 1948, disestablished 1 Dec 1949
| VA-94 (First use) | | unknown | SB2C; AD | VB-99: 1 Jul 1943-15 Oct 1943; VB-20: 15 Oct 1943-15 Nov 1946; VA-9A: 15 Nov 1946-12 Aug 1948; VA-94(1st): 12 Aug 1948 – 31 Nov 1949 | VA-94 (1st) | 31 November 1949 | Redesignated as one of CVG-9(2nd)'s initial squadrons |
| VA-95 (First use) | | unknown | TBM; AD | VT-20: 15 Oct 1943-15 Nov 1946; VA-10A: 15 Nov 1946-12 Aug 1948; VA-95(1st): 12 Aug 1948 – 30 Nov 1949 | VA-95 (1st) | 30 November 1949 | Redesignated as one of CVG-9(2nd)'s initial squadrons |
CVG-9 (3rd): Established 26 Mar 1952, still exists as CVW-9
| VA-93 | (1957) (1965) | Blue Blazers, Ravens (1976) | A4D/A-4; A-7 | VF-93(3rd): 26 Mar 1952-15 Sep 1956; VA-93: 15 Sep 1956 – 30 Aug 1986 | VA-93 | 30 August 1986 | CVG-9(3rd)'s VF-93 redesignated as a VA squadron |
| VA-94 (Second use) | (1967) | Shrikes or Mighty Shrikes (1959) | FJ-4; A4D/A-4; A-7 | VF-94(2nd): 26 Mar 1952-1 Aug 1958; VA-94(2nd): 1 Aug 1958 – 28 Jun 1990; VFA-94: 28 Jun 1990–present | VFA-94 | Not applicable, still exists | CVG-9(3rd)'s VF-94 redesignated as a VA squadron |
| VA-95 (Second use) | | Sky Knights, Green Lizards (1963) | F6F; AD/A-1; A-4 | VA-95(2nd): 26 Mar 1952 – 1 Apr 1970 | VA-95 (2nd) | 1 April 1970 | Established as CVG-9(3rd)'s only initial VA squadron (CVG-9(3rd) was established with four VF squadrons) |
| VA-96 | | unknown | AD | VA-96: 30 Jun 1956 – 10 Apr 1958 | VA-96 | 10 April 1958 | Established and assigned to Air Task Group THREE (ATG-3) |
CVG-10 (2nd): Established 1 May 1952, disestablished 20 Nov 1969 as CVW-10(1st)
| VA-104 | | Hells Archers | AD | VF-104: 1 May 1952-4 Dec 1953; VA-104: 4 Dec 1953 – 31 Mar 1959 | VA-104 | 31 March 1959 | CVG-10(2nd)'s VF-104 redesignated as a second VA squadron in the Air Group |
| VA-105 (First use) | | Cannoneers | AD | VA-105(1st): 1 May 1952 – 1 Feb 1959 | VA-105 (1st) | 1 February 1959 | Established as CVG-10(2nd)'s only initial VA squadron (CVG-10(2nd) was established with four VF squadrons). Reassigned to RCVG-4 in Nov 1958 as a FRS until its disestablishment less than 3 months later. |
| VA-106 (First use) | | Boomerangs | FJ-3 | VA-106(1st): 1 Jul 1955 – 1 Jul 1955; VF-62(2nd): 1 Jul 1955 – 1 Oct 1969 | VF-62 (2nd) | 1 October 1969 | Established as VA-106(1st) on 1 Jul 1955 and redesignated VF-62(2nd) and assigned to CVG-6(2nd) on the same day |
| VA-106 (Second use) | | Gladiators | F2H; F9F-8; A4D/A-4 | VBF-17: 2 Jan 1945-15 Nov 1946; VF-6B(3rd): 15 Nov 1946-28 Jul 1948; VF-62(1st): 28 Jul 1948-1 Jul 1955; VA-106(2nd): 1 Jul 1955 – 7 Nov 1969 | VA-106 (2nd) | 7 November 1969 | VF-62(1st) redesignated and reassigned to CVG-10(2nd) while a new VF-63(2nd) was established (as VA-106(1st) and immediately redesignated) to replace VF-62(1st) in CVG-6(2nd) |
CVG-11 (2nd): CVAG-11 redesignated CVG-11 (2nd) 1 Sep 1948, still exists as CVW-11
| VA-112 | | Broncos (1961) | A4D/A-4 | VBF-11: 9 Apr 1945-15 Nov 1946; VF-12A: 15 Nov 1946-15 July 1948; VF-112: 15 Jul 1948-15 Feb 1959; VA-112: 15 Feb 1959 – 10 Oct 1969 | VA-112 | 10 October 1969 | CVG-11(2nd)'s VF-112 redesignated as a CVG-11(2nd) VA squadron |
| VA-113 | | Stingers | F9F-8; A4D/A-4; A-7 | VF-113: 15 Jul 1948-Mar 1956; VA-113: Mar 1956-25 Mar 1983; VFA-113: 25 Mar 1983–present | VFA-113 | Not applicable, still exists | CVG-11(2nd)'s VF-113 redesignated as a CVG-11(2nd) VA squadron |
| VA-114 | | unknown | AD; F8F | VB-11: 10 Oct 1942-15 Nov 1946; VA-11A: 15 Nov 1946-15 Jul 1948; VA-114: 15 Jul 1948 – 1 Dec 1949 | VA-114 | 1 December 1949 | Redesignated as one of CVG-11(2nd)'s initial squadrons |
| VA-115 | (1956) | Arabs (1960); Eagles (1979) | TBM; AD/A-1; A-6, KA-6 | VT-11: 10 Oct 1942-15 Nov 1946; VA-12A: 15 Nov 1946-15 Jul 1948; VA-115: 15 Jul 1948 – 30 Sep 1996; VFA-115: 30 Sep 1996–present | VFA-115 | Not applicable, still exists | Redesignated as one of CVG-11(2nd)'s initial squadrons |
| VA-116 | | unknown | F7U; FJ-4 | VA-116: 1 Dec 1955 – 23 Feb 1959; VA-144: 23 Feb 1959 – 29 Jan 1971 | VA-144 | 29 January 1971 | Assigned to Air Task Group TWO (ATG-2) then redesignated VA-144 and assigned to CVG-14(2nd) |
CVG-12 (2nd): Established as CVG-102 on 1 Aug 1950 to receive USNR squadrons activated for the Korean War, redesignated CVG-12 (2nd) on 4 Feb 1952, redesignated RCVG-12 on 1 Apr 1958 to control FRSs
| VA-125 (First use) | | Rough Raiders | AD | VA-55E (USNR): 1946-Jan 1950; VA-923 (USNR): Jan 1950-4 Feb 1953; VA-125(1st): 4 Feb 1953 – 10 Apr 1958 | VA-125 (1st) | 10 April 1958 | USNR VA-923 activated on 20 Jul 1950 for the Korean War and assigned to CVG-102 when it was established 1 Aug 1950. CVG-102 was later redesignated CVG-12(2nd) on 4 Feb 1952. VA-923 redesignated VA-125(1st) and permanently activated in 1953. |
RCVG-12: CVG-12 (2nd) redesignated RCVG-12 on 1 Apr 1958 to control FRSs and other training support squadrons, redesignated RCVW-12 on 20 Dec 1963. Disestablished 30 Jun 1970
| VA-122 | | Flying Eagles | AD/A-1; T-28; A-7; T-39 | VC-35(2nd): 25 May 1950-1 Jul 1956 (same sqdn listed in VC section); VA(AW)-35: 1 Jul 1956-29 Jun 1959; VA-122: 29 Jun 1959 – 31 May 1991 | VA-122; Disestablished | 31 May 1991 | Redesignated and assigned to RCVG-12 as an AD Skyraider FRS. Later transitioned to being an A-7 Corsair II FRS |
| VA-125 (1956–77) (Second use) | | Rough Raiders | AD/A-1; A4D/A-4, TA-4; A-7 | VA-26: 30 Jun 1956-11 Apr 1958; VA-125(2nd): 11 Apr 1958 – 1 Oct 1977 | VA-125 (2nd) | 1 October 1977 | Adopted "Rough Raiders" name from disestablished VA-125(1st). VA-26 redesignated and assigned to RCVG-12 as an A4D/A-4 Skyhawk FRS. Later became an A-7 Corsair II FRS |
| VA-126 | | Fighting Seahawks | F9F-8T; A4D/A-4, TA-4 | VA-126: 6 Apr 1956 – 15 Oct 1965; VF-126: 15 Oct 1965 – 1 Apr 1994 | VF-126 | 1 April 1994 | Established as an instrument training squadron using the F9F-8T Cougar. Later became an A4D/A-4 Skyhawk FRS assigned to RCVG-12 |
| VA-127 | (1980) | Royal Blues, Cylons (1981) | F9F-8T/TF-9; A-4, TA-4 | VA-127: 15 Jun 1962 – 1 Mar 1987; VFA-127: 1 Mar 1987-23 Mar 1996 (same sqdn listed in VFA section) | VFA-127 | 23 March 1996 | Established from VA-126 detachment Alfa to provide advanced instrument training and jet transition training and assigned to RCVG-12. Became an A-4 FRS from 1 Jun 1970 to 1975. Provided basic refresher instrument and jet transition training and Air Combat Maneuvering (ACM) training from 1975 to 1983. 1 Oct 1983 became an "Adversary" squadron providing ACM training to fleet squadrons. |
| VA-128 | | Golden Intruders | A-6; TC-4C | VA-128: 1 Sep 1967 – 29 Sep 1995 | VA-128 | 29 September 1995 | Established as an A-6 Intruder FRS assigned to RCVW-12 |
CVG-13 (2nd): CVAG-13 redesignated CVG-13 (2nd) 1 Sep 1948, disestablished 30 Nov 1949
| VA-134 (First use) | | Hell Razors | F4U | VB-81: 1 Mar 1944-15 Nov 1946; VA-13A: 15 Nov 1946-2 Aug 1948; VA-134(1st): 2 Aug 1948 – 15 Feb 1950; VF-174: 15 Feb 1950-1 Jul 1966; VA-174(2nd): 1 Jul 1966 – 30 Jun 1988 | VA-174 (2nd) | 30 June 1988 | Initially assigned to CVG-1(2nd) but soon redesignated as one of CVG-13(2nd)'s initial squadrons |
| VA-135 (First use) | | Uninvited | TBM; AD | VT-81: 1 Mar 1944-15 Nov 1946; VA-14A: 15 Nov 1946- 2 Aug 1948; VA-135(1st): 2 Aug 1948 – 30 Nov 1949 | VA-135 (1st) | 30 November 1949 | Redesignated as one of CVG-13(2nd)'s initial squadrons |
CVG-13 (3rd): Established 21 Aug 1961, disestablished 1 Oct 1962
| VA-133 | | Blue Knights | A4D | VA-133: 21 Aug 1961 – 1 Oct 1962 | VA-133 | 1 October 1962 | Established as one of CVG-13(3rd)'s initial squadrons |
| VA-134 (Second use) | | Scorpions | A4D | VA-134(2nd): 21 Aug 1961 – 1 Oct 1962 | VA-134 (2nd) | 1 October 1962 | Established as one of CVG-13(3rd)'s initial squadrons |
| VA-135 (Second use) | | Thunderbirds | AD | VA-135(2nd): 21 Aug 1961 – 1 Oct 1962 | VA-135 (2nd) | 1 October 1962 | Established as one of CVG-13(3rd)'s initial squadrons. Adopted the insignia but not the name of the disestablished VA-35(1st) |
CVG-14 (2nd): Established as CVG-101 1 Aug 1950 to receive USNR squadrons activated for the Korean War, redesignated CVG-14 (2nd) 4 Feb 1952, deactivated 31 Mar 2017 as CVW-14
| VA-144 | | Road Runners (1960s) | FJ-4; A4DA-4 | VA-116: 1 Dec 1955-23 Feb 1959; VA-144: 23 Feb 1959 – 29 Jan 1971 | VA-144 | 29 January 1971 | VA-116 reassigned to CVG-14(2nd) and redesignated. Remained attached to CVG-14(2nd)/CVW-14 until 1965 |
| VA-145 | (1954) | Rustlers, Swordsmen (1954) | AD/A-1; A-6, KA-6 | VA-702 (USNR): 1 Dec 1949-4 Feb 1953; VA-145: 4 Feb 1953 – 1 Oct 1993 | VA-145 | 1 October 1993 | USNR VA-702 activated on 20 Jul 1950 for the Korean War and assigned to CVG-101 when it was established 1 Aug 1950. CVG-101 was later redesignated CVG-14(2nd) on 4 Feb 1952. VA-702 redesignated VA-145 and permanently activated in 1953. Remained attached to CVG-14(2nd)/CVW-14 until 1967 |
| VA-146 | (1968) | Blacktails, Blue Diamonds (Late 1950s) | F9F Panther; F9F Cougar; FJ-4; A4D/A-4; A-7 | VA-146: 1 Feb 1956 – 21 Jul 1989; VFA-146: 21 Jul 1989–present | VFA-146 | Not applicable, still exists | Assigned to CVG-14(2nd)/CVW-14 until 1967 |
CVG-15 (2nd): CVAG-15 redesignated CVG-15 (2nd) 1 Sep 1948, disestablished 1 Dec 1949
| VA-154 | | Flying Cannons | AD | VB-153: 26 Mar 1945-15 Nov 1946; VA-15A: 15 Nov 1946-15 Jul 1948; VA-154: 15 Jul 1948 – 1 Dec 1949 | VA-154 | 1 December 1949 | Redesignated as one of CVG-15(2nd)'s initial squadrons |
| VA-155 (First use) | (1949) | unknown | AD | VT-153: 26 Mar 1945-15 Nov 1946; VA-16A: 15 Nov 1946-15 Jul 1948; VA-155(1st): 15 Jul 1948 – 30 Nov 1949 | VA-155 (1st) | 30 November 1949 | Redesignated as one of CVG-15(2nd)'s initial squadrons |
CVG-15 (3rd): Established 5 Apr 1951 to receive USNR squadrons activated for the Korean War, disestablished 31 Mar 1995 as CVW-15
| VA-151 | | Black Knights | F7U; F9F-8; FJ-4 | VF-653: Dec 1949-4 Feb 1953; VF-151(3rd): 4 Feb 1953-7 Feb 1956; VA-151: 7 Feb 1956 – 23 Feb 1959; VA-23: 23 Feb 1959 – 1 Apr 1970 | VA-23 | 1 April 1970 | Assigned to Air Task Group ONE (ATG-1). Reassigned to CVG-2(2nd) and redesignated VA-23 |
| VA-152 | | Friendlies, Mavericks (1968) | F2H; AD/A-1; A-4 | VF-713 (USNR): late 1940s-4 Feb 1953; VF-152(3rd): 4 Feb 1953-1 Aug 1958; VA-152: 1 Aug 1958 – 29 Jan 1971 | VA-152 | 29 January 1971 | CVG-15(3rd) VF squadron redesignated as a VA squadron. Assigned to Air Task Group FOUR (ATG-4) and CVG-15(3rd)/CVW-15 until 1964. |
| VA-153 | | Blue Tail Flies | F9F-8; A4D/A-4; A-7 | VF-718: est date unk-Sep 1949; VF-831: Sep 1949-4 Feb 1953; VF-153(3rd): 4 Feb 1953-17 Dec 1956; VA-153: 17 Dec 1956 – 30 Sep 1977 | VA-153 | 30 September 1977 | CVG-15(3rd) VF squadron redesignated as a VA squadron. Assigned to CVG-15(3rd)/CVW-15 until 1969 |
| VA-155 (Second use) | | Silver Fox (early 1960s) | AD; A4D/A-4; A-7 | VA-71E (USNR): 1946-1 Oct 1948; VA-58A (USNR): 1 Oct 1948-1 Nov 1949; VC-722 (USNR): 1 Nov 1949-1 Apr 1950; VA-728 (USNR): 1 Apr 1950-4 Feb 1953; VA-155(2nd): 4 Feb 1953 – 30 Sep 1977 | VA-155 (2nd) | 30 September 1977 | USNR VA-728 activated on 1 Feb 1951 for the Korean War and assigned to CVG-15(3rd) when it was established on 5 Apr. Permanently activated and redesignated VA-155(2nd) in 1953. Remained assigned to CVG-15(2nd)/CVW-15 until 1968. Adopted insignia of disestablished VA-155(1st) |
| VA-156 | | Iron Tigers | F11F | VA-156: 4 Jun 1956 – 20 Jan 1959; VF-111(2nd): 20 Jan 1959-1 Sep 1964; VF-26(2nd): 1 Sep 1964-17 Sep 1964; VF-111(3rd): 17 Sep 1964 – 31 Mar 1995 | VF-111 (3rd) | 31 March 1995 | Though designated a VA squadron it was equipped with a front line fighter and identified itself as a fighter squadron. It was assigned to CVG-11(2nd) and eventually redesignated as a VF squadron carrying the CVG-11(2nd) designation of VF-111 |
CVG-16 (2nd): Established 1 Sep 1960, disestablished 30 Jun 1970 as CVW-16
| VA-163 | | Saints | A4D/A-4 | VA-163: 1 Sep 1960 – 1 Jul 1971 | VA-163 | 1 July 1971 | Established as one of CVG-16(2nd)'s initial squadrons |
| VA-164 | | Ghost Riders | A4D/A-4 | VA-164: 1 Sep 1960 – 2 Dec 1975 | VA-164 | 2 December 1975 | Established as one of CVG-16(2nd)'s initial squadrons |
| VA-165 | (mid 1960s) | Boomers (mid 1960s) | AD/A-1; A-6, KA-6 | VA-165: 1 Sep 1960 – 30 Sep 1996 | VA-165 | 30 September 1996 | Established as one of CVG-16(2nd)'s initial squadrons |
CVG-17 (2nd): CVAG-17 redesignated CVG-17 (2nd) 1 Sep 1948, disestablished 15 Sep 1958
| VA-172 | | Bluebolts | F2H; A4D/A-4 | VBF-82: 20 Aug 1945-15 Nov 1946; VF-18A: 15 Nov 1946-11 Aug 1948; VF-172: 11 Aug 1948-1 Nov 1955; VA-172: 1 Nov 1955 – 15 Jan 1971 | VA-172 | 15 January 1971 | CVG-17(2nd) VF squadron redesignated a VA squadron. Remained assigned to CVG-17(2nd) until 1959 |
| VA-174 (First use) | | Battering Rams | AM; AD | VB-82: 1 Apr 1944-15 Nov 1946; VA-17A: 15 Nov 1946-11 Aug 1948; VA-174: 11 Aug 1948 – 25 Jan 1950 | VA-174 | 25 January 1950 | Redesignated as one of CVG-17(2nd)'s initial squadrons |
| VA-175 | (1951) | Devils Diplomats | TBM; AD | VT-82: 1 Apr 1944-15 Nov 1946; VA-18A: 15 Nov 1946-11 Aug 1948; VA-175: 11 Aug 1948 – 15 Mar 1958 | VA-175 | 15 March 1958 | Redesignated as one of CVG-17(2nd)'s initial squadrons |
| VA-176 | | Thunderbolts | AD/A-1; A-6, KA-6 | VA-176: 1 Jun 1955 – 1 Oct 1992 | VA-176 | 1 October 1992 | Initially assigned to Air Task Group 202 (ATG-202) and reassigned to CVG-17(2nd) in 1958 but only for six months before being again reassigned (without being redesignated) |
CVG-19 (2nd): CVAG-19 redesignated CVG-19 (2nd) 1 Sep 1948, disestablished 30 Jun 1977 as CVW-19
| VA-192 | | Golden Dragons | F9F Cougar; FJ-4; A4D/A-4; A-7 | VF-153(1st): 26 Mar 1945-15 Nov 1946; VF-15A: 15 Nov 1946-15 Jul 1948; VF-151(2nd): 15 Jul 1948-15 Feb 1950; VF-192(2nd): 15 Feb 1950-15 Mar 1956; VA-192: 15 Mar 1956 – 10 Jan 1986; VFA-192: 10 Jan 1986–present | VFA-192 | Not applicable, still exists | CVG-19(2nd) VF squadron redesignated a VA squadron. Remained assigned to CVG-19(2nd)/CVW-19 until 1970 |
| VA-194 | | unknown | AD | VB-19: 15 Aug 1943-15 Nov 1946; VA-19A: 15 Nov 1946-15 Aug 1948; VA-194: 24 Aug 1948 – 1 Dec 1949 | VA-194 | 1 December 1949 | Redesignated as one of CVG-19(2nd)'s initial squadrons |
| VA-195 | (1949) (1950s) | Tigers (1949); Dam Busters (1951) | AD; A4D/A-4; A-7 | VT-19: 15 Aug 1943-15 Nov 1946; VA-20A: 15 Nov 1946-24 Aug 1948; VA-195: 24 Aug 1948 – 15 Apr 1985; VFA-195: 15 Apr 1985–present | VFA-195 | Not applicable, still exists | Redesignated as one of CVG-19(2nd)'s initial squadrons. Remained assigned to CVG-19(2nd)/CVW-19 until 1970 |
| VA-196 | (1967) | Main Battery, Milestones | AD/A-1; A-6, KA-6 | VF-153(2nd): 15 Jul 1948-15 Feb 1950; VF-194(1st): 15 Feb 1950-4 May 1955; VA-196: 4 May 1955 – 21 Mar 1997 | VA-196 | 21 March 1997 | CVG-19(2nd) VF squadron redesignated a VA squadron. Assigned to Air Task Group ONE (ATG-1) and CVG-19(2nd)/CVW-19 until 1967. "Milestones" name used interchangeably with "Main Battery" beginning in 1979. |
CVG-21 (1st): Established 15 Sep 1948, disestablished 15 Mar 1949
| VA-213 | | unknown | TBM-3E | VA-213: 15 Sep 1948-Jun 1949 | VA-213 | June 1949 | Established as one of CVG-21(1st)'s initial squadrons |
| VA-214 (First use) | | unknown | TBM-3E | VA-214(1st): 15 Sep 1948 – 16 May 1949 | VA-214 (1st) | 16 May 1949 | Established as one of CVG-21(1st)'s initial squadrons |
CVG-21 (2nd): Established 1 Jul 1955, disestablished 12 Dec 1975 as CVW-21
| VA-212 | | Rampant Raiders | F7U; F9F-8; FJ-4; A4D/A-4 | VF-212(2nd): 20 Jun 1955-1 Apr 1956; VA-212: 1 Apr 1956 – 12 Dec 1975 | VA-212 | 12 December 1975 | CVG-21(2nd) VF squadron redesignated a VA squadron. Assigned to CVG-21(2nd)/CVW-21 |
| VA-214 (Second use) | | Volunteers | F9F-8; FJ-4 | VF-214: 30 Mar 1955-11 Oct 1956; VA-214(2nd): 11 Oct 1956 – 1 Aug 1958 | VA-214 (2nd) | 1 August 1958 | CVG-21(2nd) VF squadron redesignated a VA squadron and reassigned to Air Task Group FOUR (ATG-4) |
| VA-215 (First use) | | Barn Owls (1960) | AD/A-1 | VA-215(1st): 15 Jun 1955 – 31 Aug 1967 | VA-215 (1st) | 31 August 1967 | Assigned to CVG-21(2nd)/CVW-21 from establishment to disestablishment |
| VA-216 | | Black Diamonds | AD; FJ-4; A4D/A-4 | VA-216: 28 Mar 1955 – 1 Aug 1970 | VA-216 | 1 August 1970 | Initially assigned to Air Task Group FOUR (ATG-4) then to CVG-21(2nd)/CVW-21 |
The system that determined squadron designation by Carrier Air Wing (CVW) assignment (CVGs had been retitled CVWs on 20 December 1963) was discontinued by 1965. Existing squadron designation numbers were "frozen" and no longer changed with Carrier Air Wing reassignment. Newly established or redesignated squadrons were numbered in accordance with factors determined at the time of establishment or redesignation.
| VA-15 (Second use) | | Valions | A-7 | VA-67:1 Aug 1968-2 Jun 1969; VA-15(2nd): 2 Jun 1969 – 1 Oct 1986; VFA-15: 1 Oct 1986–present (inactive 31 May 2017 – present) (same sqdn listed in VFA section) | VFA-15 | 31 May 2017 (Deactivated) | Adopted both the "Valions" name and the insignia from the disestablished VA-15(1st). Initially assigned to CVW-6 |
| VA-27 | | Royal Maces | A-7 | VA-27: 1 Sep 1967 – 24 Jan 1991; VFA-27: 24 Jan 1991–present | VFA-27 | Not applicable, still exists | Initially assigned to CVW-14 |
| VA-34 (1970-99 (Third use) | | Blue Blasters | A-6, KA-6 | VA-34(3rd): 1 Jan 1970 – 30 Sep 1996; VFA-34: 30 Sep 1996–present | VFA-34 | Not applicable, still exists | Adopted both the "Blue Blasters" name and the insignia from the disestablished VA-34(2nd). Initially assigned to CVW-1 |
| VA-36 (Second use) | | Road Runners | A-6, KA-6 | VA-36(2nd): 6 Mar 1987 – 1 Apr 1994 | VA-36 (2nd) | 1 April 1994 | Adopted "Roadrunners" name from disestablished VA-36(1st). Assigned to CVW-8 from establishment to disestablishment |
| VA-37 | (1980s) | Bulls | A-7 | VA-37: 1 Jul 1967 – 28 Nov 1990; VFA-37: 28 Nov 1990–present | VFA-37 | Not applicable, still exists | Initially assigned to CVW-11 |
| VA-38 | | | None | VA-38: 1 Mar 1967 – 1 Oct 1968 | VA-38 | 1 October 1968 | Was intended as a new A-7 squadron but never received any aircraft and was disestablished |
| VA-55 (Second use) | | Warhorses | A-6, KA-6 | VA-55(2nd): 7 Oct 1983 – 1 Jan 1991 | VA-55 (2nd) | 1 January 1991 | Adopted both the "Warhorses" name and the insignia from the disestablished VA-55(1st). Assigned to CVW-13 from establishment to disestablishment |
| VA-67 | | Vulcans | A-7 | VA-67:1 Aug 1968-2 Jun 1969; VA-15(2nd): 2 Jun 1969-1 Oct 1986; VFA-15: 1 Oct 1986–present (inactive 31 May 2017 – present) | VFA-15 | 31 May 2017 (Deactivated) | Established as VA-67 but redesignated VA-15(2nd) before it departed on its first deployment with CVW-6 |
| VA-82 | | Marauders | A-7 | VA-82: 1 May 1967 – 13 Jul 1987; VFA-82: 13 Jul 1987–present (inactive 30 Sep 2005–present) (same sqdn listed in VFA section) | VFA-82 | 30 September 2005 (Deactivated) | Initially assigned to CVW-6 |
| VA-87 | | Golden Warriors | A-7 | VA-87: 1 Feb 1968 – 1 May 1986; VFA-87: 1 May 1986 – present | VFA-87 | Not applicable, still exists | Initially assigned to CVW-16 |
| VA-95 (Third use) | | Green Lizards | A-6, KA-6 | VA-95(3rd): 1 Apr 1972 – 31 Oct 1995 | VA-95 (3rd) | 31 October 1995 | Adopted "Green Lizards" name from disestablished VA-95(2nd)). Initially assigned to CVW-15 |
| VA-97 | | Warhawks | A-7 | VA-97: 1 Jun 1967 – 24 Jan 1991; VFA-97: 24 Jan 1991–present | VFA-97 | Not applicable, still exists | Initially assigned to CVW-14 |
| VA-105 (1967–90) (Second use) | | Gunslingers | A-7 | VA-105(2nd): 4 Mar 1968 – 17 Dec 1990; VFA-105: 17 Dec 1990–present | VFA-105 | Not applicable, still exists | Initially assigned to CVW-11 |
| VA-147 | | Argonauts | A-7 | VA-147: 1 Feb 1967 – 20 Jul 1989; VFA-147: 20 Jul 1989–present | VFA-147 | Not applicable, still exists | Initially assigned to CVW-2 |
| VA-155 (Third use) | | Silver Foxes | A-6, KA-6 | VA-155(3rd): 1 Sep 1987 – 30 Apr 1993 | VA-155 (3rd) | 30 April 1993 | Adopted "Silver Foxes" name from disestablished VA-155(2nd). Initially assigned to CVW-10(2nd) |
| VA-174 (Second use) | | Hell Razors | A-7 | VB-81: 1 Mar 1944-15 Nov 1946; VA-13A: 15 Nov 1946-2 Aug 1948; VA-134(1st): 2 Aug 1948-15 Feb 1950; VF-174: 15 Feb 1950-1 Jul 1966; VA-174(2nd): 1 Jul 1966 – 30 Jun 1988 | VA-174 (2nd) | 30 June 1988 | VF-174 began operations as a F8U Crusader FRS in March 1958 and was reassigned from CVG-17(2nd) to RCVG-4 (without being redesignated). On 1 Jul 1966 it was redesignated a VA squadron and began operations as the first A-7 FRS |
| VA-185 | | Night Hawks | A-6, KA-6 | VA-185: 1 Dec 1986 – 30 Aug 1991 | VA-186 | 30 August 1991 | Assigned to CVW-5 from establishment to disestablishment |
| VA-215 (Second use) | | Barn Owls | A-7 | VA-215(2nd): 1 Mar 1968 – 30 Sep 1977 | VA-215 (2nd) | 30 September 1977 | Adopted "Barn Owls" name from disestablished VA-215(1st). Initially assigned to CVW-9 |
The U. S. Navy Reserve established two Reserve Carrier Air Wings designated CVWR-20 and CVWR-30 in 1970. It adopted the former system and designated the squadrons in accordance with Carrier Air Wing assignment.
| VA-203 | | Blue Dolphins | A-4; A-7 | VA-203: 1 Jul 1970; VFA-203: 1 Oct 1989 (inactive 30 Jun 2004 | Deactivated 30 June 2004 | | United States Navy Reserve Squadron. Established as part of Reserve Carrier Air Wing Twenty (CVWR-20) |
| VA-204 | | River Rattlers | A-4; A-7 | VA-204: 1 Jul 1970; VFA-204: 1 May 1991 | still exists | | United States Navy Reserve Squadron. Established as part of Reserve Carrier Air Wing Twenty (CVWR-20) |
| VA-205 | | Green Falcons | A-4; A-7; A-6 | VA-205: 1 Jul 1970 | 31 December 1994 | | United States Navy Reserve Squadron. Established as part of Reserve Carrier Air Wing Twenty (CVWR-20) |
| VA-209 | | unknown | A-4 | VA-209: 1 Jul 1970 | 15 August 1971 | | United States Navy Reserve Squadron. Established as part of Reserve Carrier Air Wing Twenty (CVWR-20) |
| VA-210 | | Black Hawks | A-4 | VA-210: 1 Jul 1970 | 30 June 1971 | | United States Navy Reserve Squadron. Established as part of Reserve Carrier Air Wing Twenty (CVWR-20) |
| VA-303 | | Golden Hawks | A-4; A-7 | VA-303: 1 Jul 1970; VFA-303: 1 Jan 1984 | 31 December 1994 | | United States Navy Reserve Squadron. Established as part of Reserve Carrier Air Wing THIRTY (CVWR-30) |
| VA-304 | | Firebirds | A-4; A-7; A-6 | 1 Jul 1970 | 31 December 1994 | | United States Navy Reserve Squadron. Established as part of Reserve Carrier Air Wing THIRTY (CVWR-30) |
| VA-305 | (1971) (1974) | Hackers (1971); Lobos (1974) | A-4; A-7 | VA-305: 1 Jul 1970; VFA-305: 1 Jan 1987 | 31 December 1994 | | United States Navy Reserve Squadron. Established as part of Reserve Carrier Air Wing THIRTY (CVWR-30) |
U. S. Navy Reserve Squadrons called to active duty. There were many U.S. Navy Reserve squadrons from the end of WWII through the 1960s.
| VA-702 | | Rustlers | TBM; AD | VA-702 (USNR): 1 Dec 1949; VA-145: 4 Feb 1953 | VA-145 1 October 1993 | | Activated on 20 Jul 1950 for the Korean War and assigned to CVG-101 (later redesignated to CVG-14), redesignated and permanently activated on 4 Feb 1953 |
| VA-728 | | | AM; AD | VA-71E (USNR): 1946; VA-58A (USNR): 1 Oct 1948; VC-722 (USNR): 1 Nov 1949; VA-728 (USNR): 1 Apr 1950; VA-155: 4 Feb 1953 | VA-155 30 September 1977 | | Activated on 1 Feb 1951 for the Korean War and assigned to CVG-15(3rd), redesignated and permanently activated on 4 Feb 1953 |
| VA-776 | | | A-4 | VA-776 (USNR): 27 Jan 1968 | VA-776 18 October 1968 (Returned to reserve status) | | Dates listed are those of activation from and return to reserve status. The squadron was activated following the capture of USS Pueblo by North Korea |
| VA-831 | | unknown | A-4 | VA-831 (USNR): 27 Jan 1968 | Returned to reserve status 18 October 1968 | | Establishment and disestablishment dates are not listed. The dates listed are those of activation from and return to reserve status. The squadron was activated following the capture of USS Pueblo by North Korea |
| VA-859 | | unknown | AD | VA-859 (USNR): not listed VA-85: 4 Feb 1953 | 30 September 1994 | | Establishment date not listed, activated on 1 Feb 1951 for the Korean War and assigned to CVG-8(2nd), redesignated and permanently activated on 4 Feb 1953 |
| VA-873 | | unknown | A-4 | VA-873 (USNR): 27 Jan 1968 | Returned to reserve status 12 October 1968 | | Establishment and disestablishment dates are not listed. The dates listed are those of activation from and return to reserve status. The squadron was activated following the capture of USS Pueblo by North Korea |
| VA-923 | | Rough Riders | AM; AD | VA-55E (USNR): 1946; VA-923 (USNR): Jan 1950; VA-125: 4 Feb 1953 | 10 April 1958 | | Activated on 20 Jul 1950 for the Korean War and assigned to CVG-102 (later redesignated to CVG-12(2nd)), redesignated and permanently activated on 4 Feb 1953. (Note: VFA-125 has some material in its History section that connects VA-55E, VA-923, and VA-125.) |

=== (VC)(VA(AW)) All Weather Attack Squadrons ===
In 1949 and 1950 two squadrons were established as "Composite" squadrons VC-33 and VC-35. From 1948 to 1956 land based squadrons which provided detachments of specialized aircraft to Carrier Air Groups were designated "Composite Squadrons". These specialized functions were: All-Weather/Night Fighter; All Weather Attack and ASW; Heavy Attack (Nuclear Bombers); Airborne Early Warning; Anti-Submarine Warfare; and Photographic Reconnaissance. By 1956 composite squadrons were all redesignated with new descriptive designations. In July 1956 VC-33 and VC-35 were redesignated "Attack (All Weather)" (VA(AW))) squadrons.

The VA(AW) designation was created in 1956 when VC squadrons were re-designated using role descriptive designators. VC-33 and VC-35 had by then become attack squadrons with radar and electronic countermeasures equipped aircraft. All weather attack squadrons provided detachments of radar and electronic countermeasure equipped attack aircraft to Carrier Air Groups for night and all weather operations.

- VC-33(2nd)/VA(AW)-33/VAW-33/VAQ-33: Established 31 May 1949, disestablished 1 October 1993.

Operated early airborne electronic countermeasures aircraft through redesignations to All Weather Attack Squadron THIRTY-THREE, Carrier Airborne Early Warning Squadron THIRTY-THREE and ultimately to Tactical Electronic Warfare Squadron THIRTY-THREE.

| Designation | Insignia | Nickname | Aircraft | Lineage | Notes | Disestablished |
|---|---|---|---|---|---|---|
| VC-33(2nd) | | Night Hawks | TBM-3E, TBM-3N, TBM-3Q; SNJ-5; AD-1Q, AD-2, AD-3N,3Q, AD-4,4N,4Q; SNB-5 | VC-33(2nd): 31 May 1949 – 2 Jul 1956 | (Note: ASW and All Weather Attack detachments to CVGs. Also began developing early Electronic Countermeasures (ECM) capability with TBM-3Q and AD-1Q, AD-3Q, AD-4Q aircraft.) | |
| VA(AW)-33 | | Night Hawks | AD-5N,5Q; TF-1Q | VA(AW)-33: 2 Jul 1956-30 Jan 1959 | (Note: Night Attack & All Weather Attack detachments to CVGs. Continued advancing Electronic Countermeasures (ECM) capability with AD-5Q and TF-1Q aircraft.) | |
| VAW-33 | | Night Hawks | AD-5W/EA-1E, AD-5Q/EA-1F; TF-1Q/EC-1A | VAW-33: 30 Jan 1959-1 Feb 1968 | (Note: Provided both Airborne Early Warning (AEW) and Electronics Countermeasures (ECM) detachments to CVGs (CVWs after 1963). In 1966 AEW aircraft were divested and only ECM detachments were provided thereafter.) | |
| VAQ-33 | (Note: (1970)) | Nighthawks, Firebirds (Note: (1970)) | EA-1F, ERA-3B, EA-4F, NC-121K, EF-4B, EF-4J, TA-3B, KA-3B, EA-6A, P-3A | VAQ-33: 1 Feb 1968-1 Oct 1993 | (Note: Electronic Countermeasures dets to CVWs until 1970 when it was re tasked in an electronic aggressor role in support of Atlantic Fleet training. Also operated as the A-3 FRS from 1977 to 1991 when the A-3 was retired. Disestablished when electronic aggressor responsibilities were assumed by the Navy Reserve in 1993.) | 1 October 1993 |

- VC-35/VA(AW)-35/VA-122: Established 25 May 1950, disestablished 31 May 1991.

Operated early airborne electronic countermeasures aircraft as Composite Squadron THIRTY-FIVE and All Weather Attack Squadron THIRTY-FIVE. Redesignated Attack Squadron ONE-TWENTY-TWO assigned to Readiness Carrier Air Group 12 (RCVG-12) as an AD Skyraider FRS.

| Designation | Insignia | Nickname | Aircraft | Lineage | Notes | Disestablished |
|---|---|---|---|---|---|---|
| VC-35(2nd) | | Night Hecklers | TBM-3E, TBM-3N; AD-1H, AD-2Q, AD-3Q, N, AD-4N, Q, NL, B, AD-5,5N, AD-6; F3D-2 | VC-35(2nd): 25 May 1950 – 1 Jul 1956 | ASW and All Weather Attack Squadron | |
| VA(AW)-35 | | Night Hecklers | AD-5,5N,5Q,6,7; S2F-1; T-28B | VA(AW)-35: 1 Jul 1956-29 Jun 1959 | ASW and All Weather Attack Squadron | |
| VA-122 | | Flying Eagles | AD/A-1, T-28, A-7, T-39 | VA-122: 29 Jun 1959-31 May 1991 | RCVG-12 AD Skyraider FRS (Note: Later transitioned to an A-7 Corsair II FRS) | 31 May 1991 |

=== (VC)(VAH) Heavy Attack squadrons ===
Between 1948 and 1953 five nuclear bomber squadrons were established as "Composite" (VC) squadrons. From 1948 to 1956 large land based squadrons which provided detachments of specialized aircraft to Carrier Air Groups were designated Composite Squadrons. These specialized functions were: All-Weather/Night Fighter; All Weather Attack and ASW; Heavy Attack (Nuclear Bombers); Airborne Early Warning; Anti-Submarine Warfare; and Photographic Reconnaissance. The five nuclear bomber VC squadrons were VC-5, 6, 7, 8 and 9. On 1 November 1955 four of these VC squadrons were redesignated to "Heavy Attack" (VAH) squadrons and the fifth was redesignated eight months later on 1 July 1956.

- VC-5(2nd)/VAH-5/RVAH-5-11: Established 9 September 1948, disestablished 30 September 1977.

| Designation | Insignia | Nickname | Aircraft | Lineage | Notes | Disestablished |
|---|---|---|---|---|---|---|
| VC-5(2nd) | | Savage Sons | P2V-3C, AJ-1,2 | VC-5(2nd): 9 Sep 1948 – 1 Nov 1955 | Nuclear Bomber squadron | |
| VAH-5 | | Savage Sons | AJ-2, A3D-2/A-3B | VAH-5: 1 Nov 1955-May 1964 | Redesignated Heavy Attack (VAH) | |
| RVAH-5 | | Savage Sons | RA-5C | RVAH-5: May 1964-30 Sep 1997 | Photo Reconnaissance squadron (Note: with relinquishment of the nuclear bomber role to the USAF Atlantic Fleet VAH squadrons were redesignated Reconnaissance Attack (RVAH)) | 30 September 1977 |

- VC-6(2nd)/VAH-6/RVAH-6: Established 6 January 1959, disestablished 20 October 1978.

| Designation | Insignia | Nickname | Aircraft | Lineage | Notes | Disestablished |
|---|---|---|---|---|---|---|
| VC-6(2nd) | | Fire Bees, Fleurs | P2V, AJ-2 | VC-6(2nd): 6 Jan 1950 – 1 Jul 1956 | Nuclear Bomber squadron | |
| VAH-6 | | Fleurs | AJ-2, A3D-2/A-3B | VAH-6: 1 Jul 1956 – 23 Sep 1965 | Redesignated Heavy Attack (VAH) | |
| RVAH-6 | | Fleurs | RA-5C | RVAH-6: 23 Sep 1965-20 Oct 1978 | Photo Reconnaissance squadron (Note: with relinquishment of the nuclear bomber role to the USAF Atlantic Fleet VAH squadrons were redesignated Reconnaissance Attack (RVAH)) | 20 October 1978 |

- VC-7(2nd)/VAH-7/RVAH-7: Established 10 August 1950, disestablished 28 September 1979.

| Designation | Insignia | Nickname | Aircraft | Lineage | Notes | Disestablished |
|---|---|---|---|---|---|---|
| VC-7(2nd) | | Peacemakers of the Fleet | AJ-1,2 | VC-7(2nd): 10 Aug 1950 – 1 Nov 1955 | Nuclear Bomber squadron | |
| VAH-7 | | Peacemakers of the Fleet | AJ-2, A3D-2, A3J-1/A-5A | VAH-7: 1 Nov 1955 – 1 Dec 1964 | Redesiognated Heavy Attack (VAH) | |
| RVAH-7 | | Peacemakers of the Fleet | RA-5C | RVAH-7: 1 Dec 1964-28 Sep 1979 | Photo Reconnaissance squadron (Note: with relinquishment of the nuclear bomber role to the USAF Atlantic Fleet VAH squadrons were redesignated Reconnaissance Attack (RVAH)) | 28 September 1979 |

- VC-8(2nd)/VAH-11/RVAH-11: Established 3 December 1951, disestablished 1 June 1975.

| Designation | Insignia | Nickname | Aircraft | Lineage | Notes | Disestablished |
|---|---|---|---|---|---|---|
| VC-8(2nd) | | Checkertails | P2V-3C, AJ-1,2 | VC-8(2nd): 3 Dec 1951 – 1 Nov 1955 | Nuclear Bomber squadron | |
| VAH-11 | | Checkertails | AJ-2, A3D-2/A-3B | VAH-11: 1 Nov 1955 – 1 Jul 1966 | Redesignated Heavy Attack (VAH) | |
| RVAH-11 | | Checkertails | RA-5C | RVAH-11: 1 Jul 1966-1 Jun 1975 | Photo Reconnaissance squadron (Note: with relinquishment of the nuclear bomber role to the USAF Atlantic Fleet VAH squadrons were redesignated Reconnaissance Attack (RVAH)) | 1 June 1975 |

- VC-9(2nd)/VAH-9/RVAH-9: Established 15 January 1953, disestablished 30 September 1977.

| Designation | Insignia | Nickname | Aircraft | Lineage | Notes | Disestablished |
|---|---|---|---|---|---|---|
| VC-9(2nd) | | Hoot Owls | AJ-2 | VC-9(2nd): 15 Jan 1953 – 1 Nov 1955 | Nuclear Bomber squadron | |
| VAH-9 | | Hoot Owls | AJ-2, A3D-2/A-3B, RA-5C | VAH-9: 1 Nov 1955 – 3 Jun 1964 | Redesignated Heavy Attack (VAH) | |
| RVAH-9 | | Hoot Owls | RA-5C | RVAH-9: 3 Jun 1964-30 Sep 1997 | Photo Reconnaissance squadron (Note: with relinquishment of the nuclear bomber role to the USAF Atlantic Fleet VAH squadrons were redesignated Reconnaissance Attack (RVAH)) | 30 September 1977 |

The VAH designation was created on 1 November 1955 when four of the five nuclear bomber Composite VC squadrons were redesignated Heavy Attack (VAH) squadrons and two new squadrons were established as such. The fifth VC squadron was redesignated 8 months later on 1 July 1956 at about the same time that a third new VAH squadron was established on 14 June 1956 and that a Patrol (VP) squadron was redesignated to VAH on 3 July 1956.

In 1964 the Navy ended its involvement with manned strategic nuclear bombing in favor of developing submarine ballistic missile capabilities. From 1964 through 1966 all Atlantic Fleet VAH squadrons transitioned to a photographic reconnaissance variant of the A-5 Vigilante and were redesignated "Reconnaissance Attack" (RVAH) squadrons. In the Pacific Fleet the five remaining squadrons retained the VAH designation but their A-3 attack aircraft were converted to KA-3 refueling tankers. In very short order electronic countermeasures (ECM) equipment was added to some of the tankers making them an EKA-3B variant. By 1970 three of the five squadrons flying the KA-3 and EKA-3 variants had been redesignated as three of the first Tactical Electronic Warfare (VAQ) squadrons. The remaining two VAH squadrons were disestablished, the last in 1971 retiring the VAH designation.

- VAH-1/RVAH-1: Established 1 November 1955, disestablished 29 January 1979.

| Designation | Insignia | Nickname | Aircraft | Lineage | Notes | Disestablished |
|---|---|---|---|---|---|---|
| VAH-1 | | Tigers | A3D-1, A3D-2/A-3B, A-5A | VAH-1: 1 Nov 1955 – 1 Sep 1964 | (Note: Nucleus of VAH-1 was formed from VP-3 which was disestablished) | |
| RVAH-1 | | Smokin' Tigers | RA-5C | RVAH-1: 1 Sep 1964-29 Jan 1979 | Photo Reconnaissance squadron (Note: with relinquishment of the nuclear bomber role to the USAF Atlantic Fleet VAH squadrons were redesignated Reconnaissance Attack (RVAH)) | 29 January 1979 |

- VAH-2/VAQ-132: Established 1 November 1955, still active as VAQ-132.

| Designation | Insignia | Nickname | Aircraft | Lineage | Notes | Current Designation |
|---|---|---|---|---|---|---|
| VAH-2 | | Royal Rampants | A3D-1, A3D-2/A-3B, KA-3B | VAH-2: 1 Nov 1955 – 1 Nov 1968 | (Note: Nucleus of VAH-2 was formed from VP-29 which was disestablished) Primarily a refueling squadron after 1964 | |
| VAQ-132 | | Scorpions | KA-3B, EKA-3B, EA-6B, EA-18G | VAQ-132: 1 Nov 1968–present | Redesignated as one of the first VAQ squadrons | VAQ-132 |

- VAH-3/RVAH-3: Established 14 June 1956, disestablished 19 August 1979.

Established as an operational VAH squadron with the A3D-1 but converted to a Fleet Replacement Squadron when Heavy Attack Training Unit Atlantic was merged into the squadron in mid 1958.

| Designation | Insignia | Nickname | Aircraft | Lineage | Notes | Disestablished |
|---|---|---|---|---|---|---|
| VAH-3 | | Sea Dragons | A3D-1, A3D-2/A-3B, A3D-2T/TA-3B, R4D-7/TC-47K, P2V-3B/P-2C, F9F-8T/TF-9J, TA-4F, TA-4J, A3J-1/A-5A, RA-5C | VAH-3: 14 Jun 1956 – 1 Jul 1964 | (Note: Nucleus of VAH-3 was formed from VP-34 which was disestablished); Atlantic Fleet A-3 & RA-5C FRS beginning in 1958. (Note: In mid-1958, the squadron was merged with Heavy Attack Training Unit Atlantic (HATULANT) and designated as the Atlantic Fleet AD3 Fleet Replacement Squadron (FRS). It continued as the sole RA-5C FRS as RVAH-3.) | |
| RVAH-3 | | Sea Dragons | A3D-1, A3D-2/A-3B, A3D-2T/TA-3B, R4D-7/TC-47K, P2V-3B/P-2C, F9F-8T/TF-9J, TA-4F, TA-4J, A3J-1/A-5A, RA-5C | RVAH-3: 1 Jul 1964-17 August 1979 | Atlantic Fleet A-3 & RA-5C FRS beginning in 1958. | 17 August 1979 |

- VP-920/VP-ML-70/VP-931/VP-57/VAH-4/VAQ-131: Established 1 May 1946, still active as VAQ-131.

Established in 1946 as one of many U.S. Navy Reserve squadrons created during the post WWII drawdown. Underwent two redesignations as a reserve squadron and on 2 September 1950 it was temporarily activated along with a number of other reserve squadrons for service in the Korean War. It was permanently activated as a Patrol Squadron and redesignated on 4 February 1953. Became the ninth VAH squadron on 3 July 1956 when it was redesignated VAH-4.

| Designation | Insignia | Nickname | Aircraft | Lineage | Notes | Current Designation |
|---|---|---|---|---|---|---|
| VP-920 | | | | VP-920: 1 May 1946-15 Nov 1946 | | |
| VP-ML-70 | | | | VP-ML-70: 15 Nov 1946-Feb 1950 | | |
| VP-931 | | | | VP-931: Feb 1950-4 Feb 1953 | USNR squadron VP-931 activated on 2 Sep 1950 for participation in the Korean War | |
| VP-57 | | | | VP-57: 4 Feb 1953-3 Jul 1956 | USNR squadron VP-931 permanently activated and redesignated | |
| VAH-4 | | Fourrunners | AD3-1, AD3-2/A-3B, KA-3B | VAH-4: 3 Jul 1956 – 1 Nov 1968 | Primarily a refueling squadron after 1964 | |
| VAQ-131 | | Lancers | KA-3B, EKA-3B, EA-6B, EA-18G | VAQ-131: 1 Nov 1968–present | Redesignated as one of the first VAQ squadrons | VAQ-131 |

- VAH-8: Established 1 May 1957, disestablished 17 January 1968.

| Designation | Insignia | Nickname | Aircraft | Lineage | Notes | Disestablished |
|---|---|---|---|---|---|---|
| VAH-8 | | Fireballers | A3D-2/A-3B, KA-3B | VAH-8: 1 May 1957 – 17 Jan 1968 | Primarily a refueling squadron after 1964 | 17 January 1968 |

- Heavy Attack Training Unit Pacific/VAH-123: Established 15 Jun 1957, disestablished 1 February 1971.

Established as a heavy bomber training unit under Heavy Attack Wing 2. Reassigned to Readiness Carrier Air Group 12 (RCVG-12) and redesignated as the 3rd FRS of RCVG-12 (Note: the first two digits of the designation (12) indicate its assignment RCVG-12, and the last digit (3) places it as the third squadron of the air group)

| Designation | Insignia | Nickname | Aircraft | Lineage | Notes | Disestablished |
|---|---|---|---|---|---|---|
| HATUPAC (Note: "Heavy Attack Training Unit Pacific") | | | P2V, FD3, F9F-8, A3D-1A/A-3A, A3D-2A/A-3B, A3D-2T/TA-3B, A3D-2P, A3D-1Q, A3D-2Q, KA-3B, A-6A | HATUPAC: 15 Jun 1957-29 Jun 1959 | Pacific Fleet A-3 & A-6 FRS | |
| VAH-123 | | Professionals (Note: (1961)) | P2V, FD3, F9F-8, A3D-1A/A-3A, A3D-2A/A-3B, A3D-2T/TA-3B, A3D-2P, A3D-1Q, A3D-2Q, KA-3B, A-6A | VAH-123: 29 Jun 1959 – 1 Feb 1971 | Pacific Fleet A-3 & A-6 FRS | 1 February 1971 |

- VAH-15: Established 15 January 1958, disestablished 15 February 1959.

| Designation | Insignia | Nickname | Aircraft | Lineage | Notes | Disestablished |
|---|---|---|---|---|---|---|
| VAH-15 | | Sambos | AJ-2, TV-2 | VAH-15: 15 Jan 1958 – 15 Feb 1959 | (Note: Operated primarily as an Aerial Refueling squadron.) | 15 February 1959 |

- VAH-16: Established 15 January 1958, disestablished 30 January 1959.

| Designation | Insignia | Nickname | Aircraft | Lineage | Notes | Disestablished |
|---|---|---|---|---|---|---|
| VAH-16 | | White Blades | AJ-2 | VAH-16: 15 Jan 1958 – 30 Jan 1959 | (Note: Operated primarily as an Aerial Refueling squadron.) | 30 January 1959 |

- VAH-13/RVAH-13: Established 3 January 1961, disestablished 30 June 1976.

| Designation | Insignia | Nickname | Aircraft | Lineage | Notes | Disestablished |
|---|---|---|---|---|---|---|
| VAH-13 | | Bats | A3D-2/A-3B | VAH-13: 3 Jan 1961 – 1 Nov 1964 | | |
| RVAH-13 | | Bats | RA-5C | RVAH-13: 1 Nov 1964-30 Jun 1976 | Photo Reconnaissance squadron (Note: with relinquishment of the nuclear bomber role to the USAF Atlantic Fleet VAH squadrons were redesignated Reconnaissance Attack (RVAH)) | 30 June 1976 |

- VAH-10/VAQ-129: Established 1 May 1961, still active as VAQ-129.

| Designation | Insignia | Nickname | Aircraft | Lineage | Notes | Current Designation |
|---|---|---|---|---|---|---|
| VAH-10 | | Vikings | A3B-2/A-3B, KA-3B | VAH-10: 1 May 1961 – 1 Sep 1970 | | |
| VAQ-129 | | Vikings | KA-3B, EKA-3B, EA-6B, EA-18G | VAQ-129: 1 Sep 1970–present | EA-6B FRS (Note: Redesignated VAQ-129 to become the Fleet Replacement Squadron for the then new EA-6B electronic countermeasures aircraft. Continued to provide KA-3 and EKA-3 detachments to Carrier Air Wings until 1972 when it became solely the EA-6B FRS) | VAQ-129 |

- VAH-21: Established 1 September 1968, disestablished 16 June 1969.

A unique land based squadron equipped with a specialized night and all-weather ground attack variant of the P-2 Neptune. Four were converted in 1968 for this squadron for operations in South Vietnam.

| Designation | Insignia | Nickname | Aircraft | Lineage | Notes | Disestablished |
|---|---|---|---|---|---|---|
| VAH-21 | | Roadrunners | AP-2H | VAH-21: 1 Sep 1968 – 16 Jun 1969 | | 16 June 1969 |

=== (VAL) Light Attack Squadrons ===
The Light Attack (VAL) designation was created in 1969 and designated only one squadron (VAL-4) which was established to support riverine and special operations during the Vietnam War. The designation was retired with the disestablishment of the squadron. A Helicopter Light Attack (HAL) designation had been created in 1967 to designate a single light attack helicopter squadron (HAL-3). HAL-3 and VAL-4 conducted operations in the Mekong Delta region of South Vietnam.

| Designation | Insignia | Nickname | Aircraft | Established | Disestablished | Notes |
|---|---|---|---|---|---|---|
| VAL-4 | | Yellow Jackets (Note: (1969); Black Ponies (Note: (1971)) | OV-10A, YOV-10D | 3 Jan 1969 | 10 April 1972 | Established to support Riverine Forces, SEALs and joint operations in Mekong Delta region |

== Early Warning and Electronic Countermeasures Squadrons ==
Specialized airborne early warning technologies were first developed during WWII and were advanced and refined until early warning squadrons appeared for the first time in 1948 with the establishment of two squadrons to provide specialized radar equipped aircraft to carrier air groups. Similarly electronic countermeasures (ECM) aircraft first appeared during WWII. The early "Carrier Airborne Early Warning" (VAW) squadrons advanced the technologies, techniques and procedures in both of these specialized areas until in the early to mid 1960s squadrons were specialized in either airborne early warning or electronic countermeasures resulting in the creation of the two separate specialized squadron types of Airborne Early Warning (VW) and (VAW) and Electronic Countermeasures (VQ) and (VAQ). Two of those designations still designate squadrons today as "Airborne Command and Control" (VAW) and Electronic Attack (VAQ) squadrons.

=== (VC)(VAW) Carrier Airborne Early Warning Squadrons ===
The VAW designation was first used in July 1948 with the establishment of VAW-1 and VAW-2 to designate "Carrier Airborne Early Warning Squadron". It was in use for only a month as in August 1948 VAW-1 and VAW-2 were redesignated "Composite Squadron" VC-11 and VC-12. From 1948 to 1956 land based squadrons which provided detachments of specialized aircraft to Carrier Air Groups were designated "Composite Squadrons". These specialized functions were: All-Weather/Night Fighter; All Weather Attack and ASW; Heavy Attack (Nuclear Bombers); Airborne Early Warning; Anti-Submarine Warfare; and Photographic Reconnaissance. By 1956 composite squadrons were all redesignated with new descriptive designations. In February 1956 the two VC Carrier Airborne Early Warning squadrons were redesignated to "Carrier Airborne Early Warning" (VAW) squadrons.

In 1956 the VAW designation was resurrected when VC-11 and VC-12 were redesignated VAW-11 and VAW-12. In 1967, VAW-11 and VAW-12 which were large land based squadrons that provided detachments of Airborne Early Warning aircraft to deploying Carrier Air Wings were redesignated as wings and each of their detachments were established as separate squadrons. Established from VAW-11 were RVAW-110 (a FRS), VAW-111, 112, 113, 114, 115, 116 and established from VAW-12 were RVAW-120 (a FRS), VAW-121, 122, 123, 124. For a short time in 1968 the VAW designation designated "Tactical Electronics Warfare squadron" as well as "Airborne Early Warning squadron" when VAW-13 and VAW-33 which had been operating as electronic countermeasures squadrons were retitled as such until they were redesignated with the new VAQ designation later that year (see the VAQ section).

In 2019, the VAW designation was renamed from "Carrier Airborne Early Warning Squadron" to "Airborne Command and Control Squadron" and all VAW squadrons were renamed "Airborne Command & Control Squadron____" while retaining the VAW designation.

Note: The parenthetical (1st) and (2nd) appended to some designations in the table below are not a part of the squadron designation system. They are added to indicate that the designation was used more than once during the history of U.S. Naval Aviation and which use of the designation is indicated. Absence indicates that the designation was used only once.

- VAW-1/VC-11(2nd)/VAW-11: Established 6 July 1948, elevated to wing status on 20 April 1967 as Carrier Airborne Early Warning Wing 11.

Provided Airborne Early Warning (AEW) aircraft detachments to deploying Carrier Air Groups and from 1958 through July 1961 also provided Electronic Countermeasures (ECM) detachments. Became Airborne Early Warning Wing 11 on 20 April 2967.

| Designation | Insignia | Nickname | Aircraft | Lineage | Notes | Disestablished |
|---|---|---|---|---|---|---|
| VAW-1 | | | TBM-3W | VAW-1: 6 Jul 1948-Aug 1948 | (Note: Land based squadron, provided detachments of Airborne Early Warning Aircraft and Electronic Countermeasures Aircraft to deploying Carrier Air Groups (Carrier Air Wings after 1963). Redesignated a wing on 20 April 1967 and subordinate dets were established as squadrons) | |
| VC-11(2nd) | | Early Elevens | TBM-3W, AD-3W,4W,5W,5Q | VC-11(2nd): 1 Sep 1948 – 2 Jul 1956 | (Note: Land based squadron, provided detachments of Airborne Early Warning Aircraft and Electronic Countermeasures Aircraft to deploying Carrier Air Groups (Carrier Air Wings after 1963). Redesignated a wing on 20 April 1967 and subordinate dets were established as squadrons) | |
| VAW-11 | | Early Elevens | AD-5W, AD-5Q/EA-1E, WF-2/E-1B, TF-1Q, E-2A | VAW-11: Feb 1956-20 Apr 1967 | (Note: Land based squadron, provided detachments of Airborne Early Warning Aircraft and Electronic Countermeasures Aircraft to deploying Carrier Air Groups (Carrier Air Wings after 1963). Redesignated a wing on 20 April 1967 and subordinate dets were established as squadrons) | 20 April 1967 |

- VAW-2/VC-12(2nd)/VAW-12: Established 6 July 1948, elevated to wing status on 1 April 1967 as Carrier Airborne Early Warning Wing 12.

Provided Airborne Early Warning (AEW) aircraft detachments to deploying Carrier Air Groups. Became Airborne Early Warning Wing 12 on 1 April 2967.

| Designation | Insignia | Nickname | Aircraft | Lineage | Notes | Disestablished |
|---|---|---|---|---|---|---|
| VAW-2 | | Bats | TBM-3W | VAW-2: 6 Jul 1948-Aug 1948 | (Note: Land based squadron, provided detachments of Airborne Early Warning Aircraft to deploying Carrier Air Groups (Carrier Air Wings after 1963). Redesignated a wing on 1 April 1967 and subordinate dets were established as squadrons) | |
| VC-12(2nd) | | Bats | TBM-3W, AF-2W, AD-4W,5W | VC-12(2nd): 1-Sep 1948-2 Jul 1956 | (Note: Land based squadron, provided detachments of Airborne Early Warning Aircraft to deploying Carrier Air Groups (Carrier Air Wings after 1963). Redesignated a wing on 1 April 1967 and subordinate dets were established as squadrons) | |
| VAW-12 | | Bats | AD-5W, E-1B, E-2A | VAW-12: Feb 1956-1 Apr 1967 | (Note: Land based squadron, provided detachments of Airborne Early Warning Aircraft to deploying Carrier Air Groups (Carrier Air Wings after 1963). Redesignated a wing on 1 April 1967 and subordinate dets were established as squadrons) | 1 April 1967 |

- VAW-13/VAQ-130: Established 1 September 1959, still active as VAQ-130.

Though the squadron carried the Carrier Airborne Early Warning (VAW) designation it provided both Airborne Early Warning (AEW) and Electronic Countermeasures (ECM) detachments to CVGs until July 1961. That month its AEW aircraft were transferred to VAW-11 after which it provided only ECM detachments. In early 1968 the squadron was renamed "Tactical Electronic Warfare Squadron THIRTEEN" while retaining the VAW-13 designation until on 1 October of that year when the VAQ designation was created to designate Tactical Electronic Warfare squadrons separately from Carrier Airborne Early Warning squadrons and the squadron was redesignated Tactical Electronic Warfare Squadron ONE THIRTY (VAQ-130).

| Designation | Insignia | Nickname | Aircraft | Lineage | Current Designation |
|---|---|---|---|---|---|
| VAW-13 | | Zappers | AD-5Q/EA-1F, EC-1A, KA-3B, EKA-3B | VAW-13: 1 Sep 1959-1 Oct 1968 | |
| VAQ-130 | | Zappers | KA-3B, EKA-3B, EA-6B, EA-18G | VAQ-130: 1 Oct 1968–present | VAQ-130 |

- VC-33(2nd)/VA(AW)-33/VAW-33/VAQ-33: Established 31 May 1949, disestablished 1 October 1993.

Provided Night Fighter, Airborne Early Warning (AEW), and Electronic Countermeasures (ECM) aircraft to deploying carrier air groups.

| Designation | Insignia | Nickname | Aircraft | Lineage | Notes | Disestablished |
|---|---|---|---|---|---|---|
| VC-33(2nd) | | Night Hawks | TBM-3E, TBM-3N, TBM-3Q; SNJ-5; AD-1Q, AD-2, AD-3N,3Q, AD-4,4N,4Q; SNB-5 | VC-33(2nd): 31 May 1949 – 2 Jul 1956 | (Note: ASW and All Weather Attack detachments to CVGs. Also began developing early Electronic Countermeasures (ECM) capability with TBM-3Q and AD-1Q, AD-3Q, AD-4Q aircraft.) | |
| VA(AW)-33 | | Night Hawks | AD-5N,5Q; TF-1Q | VA(AW)-33: 2 Jul 1956-30 Jan 1959 | (Note: Night Attack & All Weather Attack detachments to CVGs. Continued advancing Electronic Countermeasures (ECM) capability with AD-5Q and TF-1Q aircraft.) | |
| VAW-33 | | Night Hawks | AD-5W/EA-1E, AD-5Q/EA-1F; TF-1Q/EC-1A | VAW-33: 30 Jan 1959-1 Feb 1968 | (Note: Provided both Airborne Early Warning (AEW) and Electronics Countermeasures (ECM) detachments to CVGs (CVWs after 1963). In 1966 AEW aircraft were divested and only ECM detachments were provided thereafter.) | |
| VAQ-33 | (Note: (1970)) | Nighthawks, Firebirds (Note: (1970)) | EA-1F, ERA-3B, EA-4F, NC-121K, EF-4B, EF-4J, TA-3B, KA-3B, EA-6A, P-3A | VAQ-33: 1 Feb 1968-1 Oct 1993 | (Note: Electronic Countermeasures dets to CVWs until 1970 when it was re tasked in an electronic aggressor role in support of Atlantic Fleet training. Also operated as the A-3 FRS from 1977 to 1991 when the A-3 was retired. Disestablished when electronic aggressor responsibilities were assumed by the Navy Reserve in 1993.) | 1 October 1993 |

- RVAW-110/VAW-110: Established 20 April 1967, disestablished 1 September 1994.

Established from VAW-11 when VAW-11 was elevated to wing status. Operated as the Pacific Fleet E-1B, later E-2 Fleet Replacement Squadron. Disestablished when all E-2C FRS training was consolidated into VAW-120.

| Designation | Insignia | Nickname | Aircraft | Lineage | Notes | Disestablished |
|---|---|---|---|---|---|---|
| RVAW-110 | | Firebirds | E-1B, E-2A, E-2B, E-2C | RVAW-110: 20 Apr 1967-1 May 1983 | (Note: RVAW-110 established from VAW-11 as a Fleet Replacement Squadron upon VAW-11's redesignation as a wing) | |
| VAW-110 | | Firebirds | E-2C | VAW-110: 1 May 1983-1 Sep 1994 | (Note: The "R" was dropped from the RVAW designation to conform with all other Navy FRS designations) | 1 September 1994 |

- VAW-111(1st): Established 20 April 1967, disestablished 1 June 1977.

Established from VAW-11 when VAW-11 was elevated to wing status. Operated as a deployable VAW squadron assigned to various Carrier Air Wings.

| Designation | Insignia | Nickname | Aircraft | Lineage | Disestablished |
|---|---|---|---|---|---|
| VAW-111(1st) | | Hunters (Note: (1967)); Grey Berets (Note: (1974)) | E-1B | VAW-111(1st): 20 Apr 1967-1 Jun 1977 | 1 June 1977 |

- VAW-111(2nd): Established 1 October 1986, disestablished 30 April 1988.

Established as a squadron of the newly established CVW-10(2nd). The air wing and its squadrons were sort-lived being disestablished a little under a year and a half later.

| Designation | Insignia | Nickname | Aircraft | Lineage | Notes | Disestablished |
|---|---|---|---|---|---|---|
| VAW-111(2nd) | (Note: adopted from VAW-111(1st)) | Grey Berets (Note: adopted from VAW-111(1st)) | E-2B | VAW-111(2nd): 1 Oct 1986-30 Apr 1988 | (Note: The squadron was established as part of the establishment of a new Carrier Air Wing (CVW-10(2nd)) but the wing and all of its squadrons were disestablished in 1988.) | 30 April 1988 |

- VAW-112: Established 20 April 1967, deactivated 31 May 2017.

Established from VAW-11 when VAW-11 was elevated to wing status. Operated as a deployable VAW squadron assigned to various Carrier Air Wings.

| Designation | Insignia | Nickname | Aircraft | Lineage | Deactivated (Note: Chief of Naval Operations Instruction (OPNAVINST) 5030.4E dated March 1998 changed the designation system putting it in line with the system used by the USAF and USMC in that since that date U.S. Navy aircraft squadrons are no longer disestablished, they are instead "deactivated." A deactivated squadron remains in existence, though only "on paper", awaiting possible future "reactivation". Neither its designation nor any previous designations are available for use by a new squadron. A reactivated squadron would trace its lineage back to the squadron's original establishment date, including its inactive period) |
|---|---|---|---|---|---|
| VAW-112 | | Golden Hawks | E-2A, E-2B, E-2C | VAW-112: 20 Apr 1967-31 May 2017 (Note: (inactive 31 May 2017-present)) | 31 May 2017 |

- VAW-114: Established 20 April 1967, disestablished 16 February 1995.

Established from VAW-11 when VAW-11 was elevated to wing status. Operated as a deployable VAW squadron assigned to various Carrier Air Wings.

| Designation | Insignia | Nickname | Aircraft | Lineage | Disestablished |
|---|---|---|---|---|---|
| VAW-114 | | Hormel Hawgs | E-2A, E-2C | VAW-114: 20 Apr 1967-16 Feb 1995 | 16 February 1995 |

- RVAW-120/VAW-120: Established 1 July 1967, still active as VAW-120.

Established from VAW-12 when VAW-12 was elevated to wing status. Operated as the Atlantic Fleet E-1B, later E-2 Fleet Replacement Squadron.

| Designation | Insignia | Nickname | Aircraft | Lineage | Notes | Current Designation |
|---|---|---|---|---|---|---|
| RVAW-120 | | Grey Hawks | E-1B, E-2A, E-2B, E-2C | RVAW-120: 1 Jul 1967-1 May 1983 | (Note: RVAW-120 established from VAW-12 as a Fleet Replacement Squadron upon VAW-12's redesignation as a wing) | |
| VAW-120 | | Grey Hawks | E-2C, E-2D, C-2A | VAW-120: 1 May 1983 – present | (Note: The "R" was dropped from the RVAW designation to conform with all other Navy FRS designations) | VAW-120 |

- VAW-122: Established 1 April 1967, disestablished 31 March 1996.

Established from VAW-12 when VAW-12 was elevated to wing status. Operated as a deployable VAW squadron assigned to various Carrier Air Wings.

| Designation | Insignia | Nickname | Aircraft | Lineage | Disestablished |
|---|---|---|---|---|---|
| VAW-122 | | Hummer Gators, Steeljaws | E-2A, E-2B, E-2C | VAW-122: 1 Apr 1976-31 Mar 1996 | 31 March 1996 |

- VAW-127: Established 2 September 1983, disestablished 30 September 1991.

Operated as a deployable VAW squadron assigned to various Carrier Air Wings.

| Designation | Insignia | Nickname | Aircraft | Lineage | Disestablished |
|---|---|---|---|---|---|
| VAW-127 | | Seabats | E-2C | VAW-127: 2 Sep 1983-30 Sep 1991 | 30 September 1991 |

U. S. Navy Reserve Squadrons
In 1970 the Navy Reserve established two Airborne Early Warning squadrons for its two Reserve Carrier Air Wings (CVWR-20 and CVWR-30) and two for its two Reserve AntiSubmarine Carrier Air Groups (CVSGR-70 and CVSGR-80).

- VAW-207: Established 1 July 1970, disestablished 1 September 1974.

Numbered as the seventh squadron of CVWR-20. Replaced in CVWR-20 by VAW-78 after CVSGR-70 was disestablished in 1976.

| Designation | Insignia | Nickname | Aircraft | Lineage | Notes | Disestablished |
|---|---|---|---|---|---|---|
| VAW-207 | | | E-1B | VAW-207: 1 Jul 1970-1 Sep 1974 | U S Navy Reserve (Note: Established as a squadron of CVWR-20) | 1 September 1974 |

- VAW-307: Established in July 1970, disestablished in September 1974.

Numbered as the seventh squadron of CVWR-30. Replaced in CVWR-30 by VAW-88 after CVSGR-80 was disestablished in 1976.

| Designation | Insignia | Nickname | Aircraft | Lineage | Notes | Disestablished |
|---|---|---|---|---|---|---|
| VAW-307 | | | E-1B | VAW-307: Jul 1970-Sep 1974 | U S Navy Reserve (Note: Established as a squadron of CVWR-30) | September 1974 |

- VAW-78: Established 1 July 1970, deactivated 31 March 2005.

Established as the VAW squadron of CVSGR-70. Moved to CVWR-20 when CVSGR-70 was disestablished in 1976 to replace VAW-207 which had been disestablished in 1974.

| Designation | Insignia | Nickname | Aircraft | Lineage | Notes | Deactivated (Note: Chief of Naval Operations Instruction (OPNAVINST) 5030.4E dated March 1998 changed the designation system putting it in line with the system used by the USAF and USMC in that since that date U.S. Navy aircraft squadrons are no longer disestablished, they are instead "deactivated." A deactivated squadron remains in existence, though only "on paper", awaiting possible future "reactivation". Neither its designation nor any previous designations are available for use by a new squadron. A reactivated squadron would trace its lineage back to the squadron's original establishment date, including its inactive period) |
|---|---|---|---|---|---|---|
| VAW-78 | | Fighting Escargots | E-1B, E-2B, E-2C | VAW-78: 1 Jul 1970-31 Mar 2005 (Note: (inactive 31 Mar 2005-present)) | U S Navy Reserve (Note: Established as a squadron of CVSGR-70) | 31 March 2005 |

- VAW-88: Established 1 June 1970, deactivated 31 December 1994.

Established as the VAW squadron of CVSGR-80. Moved to CVWR-30 when CVSGR-80 was disestablished in 1976 to replace VAW-307 which had been disestablished in 1974.

| Designation | Insignia | Nickname | Aircraft | Lineage | Notes | Disestablished |
|---|---|---|---|---|---|---|
| VAW-88 | | Cotton Pickers | E-1B, E-2B, E-2C | VAW-88: 1 Jun 1970-31 Dec 1994 | U S Navy Reserve (Note: Established as a squadron of CVSGR-80) | 31 December 1994 |

In 1995, the U.S. Navy Reserve established a squadron for the specific purpose of supporting the U.S. Coast Guard, U.S. Customs and other federal agencies in anti-drug smuggling efforts in the Gulf of Mexico and along the southern border.

- VAW-77: Established 1 October 1995, deactivated 9 March 2013.

Established to support counter drug efforts in the Gulf of Mexico, was administratively assigned to CVWR-20 (later Tactical Support Wing)

| Designation | Insignia | Nickname | Aircraft | Lineage | Notes | Deactivated (Note: Chief of Naval Operations Instruction (OPNAVINST) 5030.4E dated March 1998 changed the designation system putting it in line with the system used by the USAF and USMC in that since that date U.S. Navy aircraft squadrons are no longer disestablished, they are instead "deactivated." A deactivated squadron remains in existence, though only "on paper", awaiting possible future "reactivation". Neither its designation nor any previous designations are available for use by a new squadron. A reactivated squadron would trace its lineage back to the squadron's original establishment date, including its inactive period) |
|---|---|---|---|---|---|---|
| VAW-77 | | Night Wolves | E-2C | VAW-77: 1 Oct 1995-9 March 2013 (Note: (inactive 9 Mar 2013-present)) | U S Navy Reserve (Note: U S Navy Reserve Squadron established for the specific purpose of supporting the USCG and other Federal Agencies in interdicting illegal drug trafficking) | 9 March 2013 |

=== (VW) Airborne early warning squadrons ===
From its creation in 1952 until 1971 the VW designation designated "Air Early Warning Squadron", "Airborne Early Warning Squadron", or "Fleet Early Warning Squadron". In 1953 the Navy's two "Weather Reconnaissance" (VJ) squadrons were redesignated VW squadrons. From 1955 to 1958 seven more VW squadrons were established to operate as early warning squadrons in the Atlantic and Pacific Barriers which were seaward extensions of the nation's Distant Early Warning (DEW) Line. Those "barrier" VW squadrons were all disestablished by 1965 leaving only two VW squadrons remaining. In 1967 one of those two remaining VW squadrons was renamed a "Weather Reconnaissance Squadron" (while retaining the VW designation) while the other retained the "Airborne Early Warning" name even though its primary role by that time was also weather reconnaissance. In 1971 that squadron was disestablished and thereafter until the single remaining VW squadron was disestablished in 1975 the VW designation designated solely "Weather Reconnaissance Squadron". In 1975 that last VW squadron was disestablished and the VW designation cease being used.

First Airborne Early Warning Squadrons. In 1945 Patrol Bombing Squadron 101 (VPB-101) was assigned to support the development of airborne radar and procedures for early warning. In 1946 the squadron was redesignated "Experimental and Development" squadron 4 (VX-4) continuing that development. On 18 June 1952 VX-4 was redesignated Airborne Early Warning (VW) squadron 2, and a second VW squadron was established as VW-1.

- VW-1 Established 18 June 1952, disestablished in July 1971.

Established as one of the first two Airborne Early Warning (VW) squadrons. In July 1961 the squadron's primary role was changed to weather reconnaissance but it retained airborne early warning as a secondary task.

| Designation | Insignia | Nickname | Aircraft | Lineage | Notes | Disestablished |
|---|---|---|---|---|---|---|
| VW-1 | | Typhoon Trackers (Note: (1961)) | PB-1W, PO-1W/WV-1, WV-2/EC-121K, R7V-1/C-121J, WV-3/WC-121N | VW-1: 18 Jun 1952-Jul 1971 | One of the first two VW squadrons. Primarily a Weather Reconnaissance squadron beginning July 1961 | July 1971 |

- VP-11F/VP-11(1st)/VP-54(1st)/VP-51(2nd)/VB-101/VPB-101/VX-4(1st)/VW-2: Established 1 July 1936, disestablished 1 July 1961.

One of the Navy's earliest squadrons. Established as a Patrol Squadron in 1936. Operated as a Patrol Squadron through WWII. Redesignated VX-4 to develop airborne early warning equipment and procedures and redesignated on 18 June 1952 as one of the first two Airborne Early Warning (VW) squadrons

| Designation | Insignia | Nickname | Aircraft | Lineage | Notes | Disestablished |
|---|---|---|---|---|---|---|
| Patrol Squadron (6 designations) | | | | VP-11F: 1 Jul 1936-1 Oct 1937; VP-11: 1 Oct 1937-1 Jul 1939; VP-54: 1 Jul 1939-1 Jul 1941; VP-51: 1 Jul 1941-1 Mar 1943; VB-101: 1 Mar 1943-1 Oct 1944; VPB-101: 1 Oct 1944-15 May 1946 | In 1945 VPB-101 was assigned to support the development of airborne radar and procedures for early warning. | |
| VX-4(1st) | | | Boeing PB-1W, PO-1W/WV-1 | VX-4: 15 May 1946-18 Jun 1952 | Experimental and Development squadron (Note: Redesignated as an "Experimental and Development" squadron to continue the task of development and evaluation of airborne early warning equipment and procedures.) | |
| VW-2 | | | PO-1W/WV-1, WV-2 | VW-2: 18 Jun 1952 – 1 Jul 1961 | One of the first two VW squadrons | 1 July 1961 |

Redesignated Weather Reconnaissance (VJ) squadrons. From 1952 to 1953, VJ designated "Weather" or "Weather Reconnaissance" squadron. In 1953 the two weather reconnaissance squadrons were redesignated "Airborne Early Warning" (VW) squadrons becoming the third and fourth VW Squadrons.

- VJ-1/VW-3: Established 19 March 1952, disestablished 3 June 1960.

After redesignation as an airborne early warning squadron (VW) it continued to perform hurricane hunting and weather reconnaissance as a secondary role until it was disestablished.

| Designation | Insignia | Nickname | Aircraft | Lineage | Notes | Disestablished |
|---|---|---|---|---|---|---|
| VJ-1 | | | P4Y-2S | VJ-1: 19 Mar 1952-3 Sep 1953 | Weather Reconnaissance Squadron (Note: Pacific Fleet typhoon hunting squadron) | |
| VW-3 | | | P4Y-2S, P2V-5JF, WV-3, WV-2 | VW-3: Sep 1953-Jun 1960 | Airborne Early Warning Squadron (Note: Pacific Fleet Early Warning squadron with secondary weather reconnaissance and typhoon hunting role) | June 1960 |

- VJ-2/VW-4: Established 15 November 1952, disestablished 30 April 1975.

After redesignation as an airborne early warning squadron (VW) it continued as a hurricane hunter and weather reconnaissance squadron with secondary roles in tracking space launches and other support to NASA. It was redesignated a weather reconnaissance squadron (retaining the 'VW' designation) on 1 March 1967 as that was more descriptive of the squadron's primary role.

| Designation | Insignia | Nickname | Aircraft | Lineage | Notes | Disestablished |
|---|---|---|---|---|---|---|
| VJ-2 | | Hurricane Hunters | P2V-3W | VJ-2: 15 Nov 1952–1953 | Weather Reconnaissance Squadron (Note: Hurricane early warning squadron.) | |
| VW-4 | | Hurricane Hunters | P2V-3W, PO-1W/WV-1, P2V-5JF, WV-3/WC-121N, WP-3A | VW-4: Sep 1953-30 Apr 1975 | Airborne Early Warning (VW) Squadron until 1 March 1967, then Weather Reconnaissance (VW) Squadron until disestablishment (Note: Hurricane early warning squadron. Also tracked Mercury launches and provided other support to NASA. Redesignated "Weather Reconnaissance Squadron FOUR" (VW-4) on 1 March 1967 to more accurately describe the primary mission of the squadron.) | 30 April 1975 |

Atlantic and Pacific Barrier squadrons. From 1955 to 1958 seven VW squadrons were established to operate as early warning squadrons in the Atlantic and Pacific Barriers which were seaward extensions of the nation's Distant Early Warning (DEW) Line.

Atlantic Barrier

- VW-11: Established in August 1955, disestablished 7 October 1965.

Established as the first squadron to operate as part of the "Atlantic Barrier".

| Designation | Insignia | Nickname | Aircraft | Lineage | Notes | Disestablished |
|---|---|---|---|---|---|---|
| VW-11 | | | WV-2/EC-121K | VW-11: Aug 1955-7 Oct 1965 | Disestablished with the end of the Atlantic Barrier mission | 7 October 1965 |

- VW-13(1st): Established in September 1955, disestablished 15 September 1957.

Established to operate as part of the "Atlantic Barrier" but disestablished after only two years due to budgetary limitations.

| Designation | Insignia | Nickname | Aircraft | Lineage | Notes | Disestablished |
|---|---|---|---|---|---|---|
| VW-13(1st) | | | WV-2 | VW-13(1st): Sep 1955-15 Sep 1957 | | 15 September 1957 |

- VW-13(2nd): Established in June 1958, disestablished in 1965.

Established to operate as part of the "Atlantic Barrier".

| Designation | Insignia | Nickname | Aircraft | Lineage | Notes | Disestablished |
|---|---|---|---|---|---|---|
| VW-13(2nd) | (Note: Adopted insignia of VW-13(1st) which had been disestablished a year earlier) | | WV-2/EC-121K | VW-13(2nd): Jun 1958–1965 | Also collected ice distribution data for Naval Oceanographic Office | 1965 |

- VW-15: Established in October 1955, disestablished in April 1961.

Established to operate as part of the "Atlantic Barrier"

| Designation | Insignia | Nickname | Aircraft | Lineage | Notes | Disestablished |
|---|---|---|---|---|---|---|
| VW-15 | | | WV-2 | VW-15: Oct 1955-Apr 1961 | | April 1961 |

Pacific Barrier

- VW-12: Established 7 July 1956, disestablished 1 February 1960.

Established as the first squadron to operate as part of the "Pacific Barrier".

| Designation | Insignia | Nickname | Aircraft | Lineage- | Notes | Disestablished |
|---|---|---|---|---|---|---|
| VW-12 | | | WV-2 | VW-12: 7 Jul 19561 Feb 1960 | Merged into AEWBARRONPAC (Note: On 1 Feb 1960 Airborne Early Warning Wing Pacific, VW-12, VW-14 and Airborne Barrier Service Squadron-2 (the wing's aircraft maintenance organization) were merged into a single squadron designated AEW Barrier Squadron Pacific (AEWBARRONPAC) which continued in existence until 30 April 1965.) | 1 February 1960 |

- VW-14: Established in 1956, disestablished 1 February 1960.

Established as part of the "Pacific Barrier".

| Designation | Insignia | Nickname | Aircraft | Lineage | Notes | Disestablished |
|---|---|---|---|---|---|---|
| VW-14 | | | WV-2 | VW-14: 1956-1 Feb 1960 | Merged into AEWBARRONPAC (Note: On 1 Feb 1960 Airborne Early Warning Wing Pacific, VW-12, VW-14 and Airborne Barrier Service Squadron-2 (the wing's aircraft maintenance organization) were merged into a single squadron designated AEW Barrier Squadron Pacific (AEWBARRONPAC) which continued in existence until 30 April 1965.) | 1 February 1960 |

- VW-16: Established in 1956, disestablished 1 October 1957.

Established as part of the "Pacific Barrier" but disestablished due to budgetary limitations before the barrier was fully operational.

| Designation | Insignia | Nickname | Aircraft | Lineage | Notes | Disestablished |
|---|---|---|---|---|---|---|
| VW-16 | | | WV-2 | VW-16: 1956-1 Oct 1957 | | 1 October 1957 |

=== (VQ) Electronic Countermeasures Squadrons ===
In 1955 two "Electronic Countermeasures" (VQ) Squadrons were established from detachments of VW-1 and VW-2. VQ-1 was established from VW-1 detachment A in the Pacific Fleet and VQ-2 was established from VW-2 detachment A in the Atlantic Fleet. These squadrons initially operated land based multi-engine aircraft equipped with Electronic Countermeasures (jamming) equipment. They soon added an aircraft carrier capable aircraft and VQ-1 then began operating both land based and aircraft carrier based detachments in support of fleet operations. In 1960 they were both redesignated "Fleet Air Reconnaissance" (VQ) squadrons as by then they had been equipped to collect communications and other electronic signals for intelligence purposes rather than simply jamming them.

- VQ-1: Established 1 September 1955, deactivated 30 March 2025 .

Established as one of two "Electronic Countermeasures" (VQ) squadrons. Operated land based and aircraft carrier based detachments of electronic countermeasures (ECM) aircraft. It Was redesignated a "Fleet Air Reconnaissance" (VQ) squadron on 1 January 1960 when the VQ designation was changed from Electronic Countermeasures to Fleet Air Reconnaissance.

| Designation | Insignia | Nickname | Aircraft | Lineage | Notes | Deactivated |
|---|---|---|---|---|---|---|
| VQ-1 | | World Watchers | P4M-1Q, P2V, A3D-1Q, EP-3 | VQ-1: 1 Jun 1955-30 March 2025 | ECM squadron until 1 Jan 1960 (Note: on 1 January 1960 the VQ designation and the two VQ squadrons were redesignated "Fleet Air Reconnaissance" (VQ) squadrons as they had been by that time equipped to allow for the collection of communications and other electronic signals for intelligence purposes rather than simply jamming them.) | 30 March 2025 |

- VQ-2: Established 1 September 1955, deactivated 22 May 2012 .

Established as one of two "Electronic Countermeasures" (VQ) squadrons. Operated land based detachments of electronic countermeasures (ECM) aircraft. It Was redesignated a "Fleet Air Reconnaissance" (VQ) squadron on 1 January 1960 when the VQ designation was changed from Electronic Countermeasures to Fleet Air Reconnaissance.

| Designation | Insignia | Nickname | Aircraft | Lineage | Notes | Deactivated |
|---|---|---|---|---|---|---|
| VQ-2 | | Rangers | P4M-1Q, P2V-2, P2V-3, P2V-5F, A3D-1, A3D-1Q, EP-3 | VQ-1: 1 Jun 1955-22 May 2012 | ECM squadron until 1 Jan 1960 (Note: on 1 January 1960 the VQ designation and the two VQ squadrons were redesignated "Fleet Air Reconnaissance" (VQ) squadrons as they had been by that time equipped to allow for the collection of communications and other electronic signals for intelligence purposes rather than simply jamming them.) | 22 May 2012 |

=== (VAQ) Tactical Electronic Warfare/Electronic Attack Squadrons ===
By the late 1950s electronic countermeasures equipment and procedures had been developed from the airborne early warning capabilities of the Carrier Airborne Early Warning Squadrons as the technology for detecting airborne threats with radar had led to the development of electronic countermeasures equipment for countering enemy radar and the creation of an entirely new squadron type. The VAQ designation first appeared in 1968 when two Carrier Airborne Early Warning (VAW) squadrons which had been operating both airborne early warning and electronic countermeasures aircraft were redesignated Tactical Electronic Warfare (VAQ) squadrons THIRTY-THREE and ONE-THIRTY.

In February 1998 the name of the designation was changed to "Electronic Attack Squadron" and all VAQ squadrons then in existence were renamed from "Tactical Electronic Warfare Squadron-____" to "Electronic Attack Squadron-____".

In 1970 the Navy Reserve established two Reserve Carrier Air Wings and included VAQ squadrons in those wings. Those VAQ squadrons however were equipped with aircraft which were primarily tasked with tanker and carrier onboard delivery (COD) responsibilities and in 1979 a new Tactical Aerial Refueling (VAK) designation was created for them. The Navy Reserve later did establish two additional VAQ squadrons which were properly equipped with aircraft capable of fulling the Tactical Electronic Warfare role.

Note: The parenthetical (1st) appended to some designations in the tables below is not a part of the squadron designation system. It is added to indicate that the designation was used more than once during the history of U.S. Naval Aviation. Absence indicates that the designation was used only once.

- VAW-13/VAQ-130: Established 1 September 1959, still active as VAQ-130.

Though the squadron carried the Carrier Airborne Early Warning (VAW) designation it provided both Airborne Early Warning (AEW) and Electronic Countermeasures (ECM) detachments to CVGs until July 1961. That month its AEW aircraft were transferred to VAW-11 after which it provided only ECM detachments. In early 1968 the squadron was renamed "Carrier Tactical Electronics Warfare Squadron THIRTEEN" while retaining the VAW-13 designation until it was redesignated Tactical Electronic Warfare Squadron ONE-THIRTY (VAQ-130) on 1 October of that year.

| Designation | Insignia | Nickname | Aircraft | Lineage | Current Designation |
|---|---|---|---|---|---|
| VAW-13 | | Zappers | AD-5Q/EA-1F, EC-1A, KA-3B, EKA-3B | VAW-13: 1 Sep 1959-1 Oct 1968 | |
| VAQ-130 | | Zappers | KA-3B, EKA-3B, EA-6B, EA-18G | VAQ-130: 1 Oct 1968–present | VAQ-130 |

- VC-33(2nd)/VA(AW)-33/VAW-33/VAQ-33: Established 31 May 1949, disestablished 1 October 1993.

Operated early airborne electronic countermeasures aircraft through redesignations to All Weather Attack Squadron THIRTY-THREE, Carrier Airborne Early Warning Squadron THIRTY-THREE and ultimately to Tactical Electronic Warfare Squadron THIRTY-THREE. Deployed detachments to carrier air wings until 1970 when it became an electronic aggressor squadron supporting Atlantic Fleet training. Disestablished on 1 October 1993 when electronic aggressor responsibilities were assumed by the Navy Reserve.

| Designation | Insignia | Nickname | Aircraft | Lineage | Notes | Disestablished |
|---|---|---|---|---|---|---|
| VC-33(2nd) | | Night Hawks | TBM-3E, TBM-3N, TBM-3Q; SNJ-5; AD-1Q, AD-2, AD-3N,3Q, AD-4,4N,4Q; SNB-5 | VC-33(2nd): 31 May 1949 – 2 Jul 1956 | (Note: ASW and All Weather Attack detachments to CVGs. Also began developing early Electronic Countermeasures (ECM) capability with TBM-3Q and AD-1Q, AD-3Q, AD-4Q aircraft.) | |
| VA(AW)-33 | | Night Hawks | AD-5N,5Q; TF-1Q | VA(AW)-33: 2 Jul 1956-30 Jan 1959 | (Note: Night Attack & All Weather Attack detachments to CVGs. Continued advancing Electronic Countermeasures (ECM) capability with AD-5Q and TF-1Q aircraft.) | |
| VAW-33 | | Night Hawks | AD-5W/EA-1E, AD-5Q/EA-1F; TF-1Q/EC-1A | VAW-33: 30 Jan 1959-1 Feb 1968 | (Note: Provided both Airborne Early Warning (AEW) and Electronics Countermeasures (ECM) detachments to CVGs (CVWs after 1963). In 1966 AEW aircraft were divested and only ECM detachments were provided thereafter.) | |
| VAQ-33 | (Note: (1970)) | Nighthawks, Firebirds (Note: (1970)) | EA-1F, ERA-3B, EA-4F, NC-121K, EF-4B, EF-4J, TA-3B, KA-3B, EA-6A, EP-3J | VAQ-33: 1 Feb 1968-1 Oct 1993 | (Note: Electronic Countermeasures dets to CVWs until 1970 when it was re tasked in an electronic aggressor role in support of Atlantic Fleet training. Also operated as the A-3 FRS from 1977 to 1991 when the A-3 was retired. Disestablished when electronic aggressor responsibilities were assumed by the Navy Reserve in 1993.) | 1 October 1993 |

- VAQ-34: Established 1 March 1983, disestablished 5 October 1993.

Established as an electronic aggressor squadron supporting Pacific Fleet training. Disestablished on 5 October 1993 when electronic aggressor responsibilities were assumed by the Navy Reserve.

| Designation | Insignia | Nickname | Aircraft | Lineage | Disestablished |
|---|---|---|---|---|---|
| VAQ-34 | | Electric Horsemen | RA-3B, ERA-3B, KA-3B, TA-7C, EA-7L, F/A-18A | VAQ-34: 1 Mar 1983-5 Oct 1993 | 5 October 1993 |

- VAQ-35: Established 14 August 1991, disestablished 7 October 1993.

Established as a second electronic aggressor squadron in support of Pacific Fleet training. It was established using personnel and aircraft of disestablished VAQ-142(1st). Though it was not officially established until August 1991, it had begun operations in June. Disestablished on 7 October 1993 when electronic aggressor responsibilities were assumed by the Navy Reserve.

| Designation | Insignia | Nickname | Aircraft | Lineage | Disestablished |
|---|---|---|---|---|---|
| VAQ-35 | | Greywolves | EA-6B | VAQ-35: 14 Aug 1991-7 Oct 1993 | 7 October 1993 |

- VAQ-128: Established 1 October 1997, deactivated 3 September 2004.

Established as one of five planned new land based squadrons to replace USAF EF-111 squadrons when the Air Force retired that aircraft from service. The squadron was supplemented with USAF pilots and weapons systems officers.

| Designation | Insignia | Nickname | Aircraft | Lineage | Deactivated |
|---|---|---|---|---|---|
| VAQ-128 | | Fighting Phoenix | EA-6B | VAQ-128: 1 Oct 1997-3 Sep 2004 | 3 September 2004 |

- VAQ-133(1st): Established 4 March 1969, disestablished in June 1992.

Established as a sea-going squadron attached to various carrier air wings.

| Designation | Insignia | Nickname | Aircraft | Lineage | Notes | Disestablished |
|---|---|---|---|---|---|---|
| VAQ-133(1st) | | Wizards | EKA-3B, EA-6B | VAQ-133(1st): 4 Mar 1969-June 1992 | (Note: A second squadron designated VAQ-133 also called the Wizards was established 1 Apr 1996. That second VAQ-133 is still active.) | June 1992 |

- VAQ-137(1st): Established 14 December 1973, disestablished 26 May 1994.

Established as a sea-going squadron attached to various carrier air wings.

| Designation | Insignia | Nickname | Aircraft | Lineage | Notes | Disestablished |
|---|---|---|---|---|---|---|
| VAQ-137(1st) | | Rooks | EA-6B | VAQ-137(1st): 14 Dec 1973-26 May 1994 | (Note: A second squadron designated VAQ-137 also called the Rooks was established 1 Oct 1996. That second VAQ-137 is still active.) | 26 May 1994 |

- VAQ-142(1st): Established 1 June 1988, disestablished in March 1991.

Established as a sea-going squadron attached to various carrier air wings. Upon disestablishment the squadron's personnel and aircraft were used to establish VAQ-35.

| Designation | Insignia | Nickname | Aircraft | Lineage | Notes | Disestablished |
|---|---|---|---|---|---|---|
| VAQ-142(1st) | | Grim Watchdogs | EA-6B | VAQ-142(1st): 1 Jun 1988-Mar 1991 | (Note: A second squadron designated VAQ-142 called the Gray Wolves was established 1 Apr 1997. That second VAQ-142 is still active.) | March 1991 |

- VAQ-143: Established 1 August 2002, deactivated 12 November 2009.

Officially established but adequate funding was not available and shortage of aircraft made it impossible to effectively activate the squadron. The squadron was not officially deactivated until 12 November 2009.

| Designation | Insignia | Nickname | Aircraft | Lineage | Deactivated |
|---|---|---|---|---|---|
| VAQ-143 | | | EA-6B (planned) | VAQ-143: 1 Aug 2002-12 Nov 2009 | 12 November 2009 |

U. S. Navy Reserve Squadrons
In 1970 the Navy Reserve established two Tactical Electronic Warfare squadrons for its two Reserve Carrier Air Wings (CVWR-20 and CVWR-30). They were equipped with the KA-3B Skywarrior which was a tanker aircraft that the active Navy VAQ squadrons had been operating and were equipping with Electronic Countermeasures (ECM) equipment converting them to an EKA-3B variant. The aircraft of these squadrons were never converted to the EKA-3B and operated only as tankers and carrier on board delivery (COD) aircraft. On 1 October 1979 they were redesignated to Tactical Aerial Refueling Squadron TWO-ZERO-EIGHT (VAK-208) and Tactical Aerial Refueling Squadron THREE-ZERO-EIGHT (VAK-308) in recognition of the actual role of the squadrons.

- VAQ-208/VAK-208: Established 31 July 1970, disestablished 30 September 1989

| Designation | Insignia | Nickname | Aircraft | Lineage | Notes | Disestablished |
|---|---|---|---|---|---|---|
| VAQ-208 | | Jockeys | KA-3B | VAQ-208: 31 Jul 1970-1 Oct 1979 | U S Navy Reserve squadron | |
| VAK-208 | | Jockeys | KA-3B | VAK-208: 1 Oct 1979-30 Sep 1989 | U S Navy Reserve squadron | 30 September 1989 |

- VAQ-308/VAK-308: Established 2 May 1970, disestablished 30 September 1988

| Designation | Insignia | Nickname | Aircraft | Lineage | Notes | Disestablished |
|---|---|---|---|---|---|---|
| VAQ-308 | | Griffins | KA-3B | VAQ-308: 2 May 1970-1 Oct 1979 | U S Navy Reserve Squadron | |
| VAK-308 | | Griffins | KA-3B | VAK-308: 1 Oct 1979-30 Sep 1988 | U S Navy Reserve Squadron | 30 September 1989 |

In 1977 and 1979 two more Tactical Electronic Warfare squadrons were established but these squadrons were equipped with electronic countermeasures capable aircraft. One was established for each of the two Reserve Carrier Air Wings as Tactical Electronic Warfare Squadron TWO ZERO NINE (VAQ-209) and Tactical Electronic Warfare Squadron THREE ZERO NINE (VAQ-309). Only VAQ-309 is listed in this section below as VAQ-209 still exists as an active squadron.

- VAQ-309: Established 1 February 1979, disestablished 31 December 1994.

| Designation | Insignia | Nickname | Aircraft | Lineage | Notes | Disestablished |
|---|---|---|---|---|---|---|
| VAQ-309 | | Axemen | EA-6A, EA-6B | VAQ-309: 1 Feb 1979-31 Dec 1994 | U S Navy Reserve Squadron | 31 December 1994 |

== Fighter Squadrons ==
Fighter squadrons were among the Navy's first squadrons in the early 1920s. Fighter squadrons have the primary role of air to air combat in the defense of the fleet and in defense of bombing and torpedo (later attack) squadrons carrying out their attacks on enemy ships and other targets. Though air to air combat is the primary role, fighter aircraft have always had the ability to conduct air to surface or air to ground attack as well. In the late 1940s through late 1950s "All Weather Fighter" (VF(AW)) squadrons flew early radar equipped fighters and in the late 1960s there were "Antisubmarine Fighter" (VSF) squadrons which were fleet defense squadrons for specialized antisubmarine aircraft carriers and air groups. From the 1980s to 2006 "Fighter Attack" (VFA) squadrons began replacing both dedicated Fighter and dedicated Attack squadrons. The "Fighter" (VF) designation was last used in 2006 when the last VF to VFA squadron transition was completed. Two types of fighter squadrons not listed in this section are the WWII "Bombing Fighting" (VBF) and "Night Fighting" (VF(N)) squadrons which did not exist past the post war drawdown.

=== (VC)(VF(AW)) All weather/night fighter squadrons ===
In 1948 and 1949 two squadrons were established as "Composite" squadrons VC-3 and VC-4. From 1948 to 1956 land based squadrons which provided detachments of specialized aircraft to Carrier Air Groups were designated "Composite Squadrons". These specialized functions were: All-Weather/Night Fighter; All Weather Attack and ASW; Heavy Attack (Nuclear Bombers); Airborne Early Warning; Anti-Submarine Warfare; and Photographic Reconnaissance. By 1956 composite squadrons were all redesignated with new descriptive designations. In July 1956 VC-3 and VC-4 were redesignated "All Weather Fighter" (VF(AW)) squadrons.

- VC-3(2nd)/VF(AW)-3(1st): Established 20 May 1949, disestablished 2 May 1958.

| Designation | Insignia | Nickname | Aircraft | Lineage | Notes | Disestablished |
|---|---|---|---|---|---|---|
| VC-3(2nd) | | Blue Nemesis | F4U-5N, F2H-3, F9F-6, F7U-3, F11F, TV-2, FJ-3, A4D, F4D | VC-3(2nd): 20 May 1949–1 Jul 1956 | Provided dets to CVGs until Aug 1954 (Note: All wx/night Fighter Squadron until August 1954 then operated as Transitional Training Unit Pacific transitioning squadrons to new high performance jet aircraft) | |
| VF(AW)-3(1st) | | Blue Nemesis | F4D, A4D, F8U | VF(AW)-3: 1 Jul 1956-2 May 1958 | Transition Training Unit (Note: Operated as a "Transition Training Unit" transitioning squadrons to new high performance jet aircraft) | 2 May 1958 |

- VC-4(2nd)/VF(AW)-4: Established 28 September 1948, disestablished 31 August 1959.

| Designation | Insignia | Nickname | Aircraft | Lineage | Notes | Disestablished |
|---|---|---|---|---|---|---|
| VC-4(2nd) | | Night Cappers | F4U-5N, F9F, F3D, AM-1Q | VC-4(2nd): 28 Sep 1948–2 Jul 1956 | Provided dets to CVGs | |
| VF(AW)-4 | | Night Cappers | AD-5, F2H, T2V | VF(AW)-4: 2 Jul 1956-31 Aug 1959 | Provided dets to CVGs | 31 August 1959 |

- VF(AW)-3(2nd): Established 22 May 1944, disestablished in April 1963.

Functioned as Training and Development unit from May 1944 to May 1958 operating under the following names: "Air Training Unit, Pacific"; "Night Development Squadron Pacific"; and "Fighter All Weather Training Unit Pacific". It was designated an All Weather Fighter Squadron on 2 May 1958 the same day that VF(AW)-3(1st) was disestablished adopting its designation name and insignia.

| Designation | Insignia | Nickname | Aircraft | Lineage | Notes | Disestablished |
|---|---|---|---|---|---|---|
| VF(AW)-3(2nd) | (Note: adopted from VF(AW)-3(1st)) | Blue Nemesis (Note: adopted from VF(AW)-3(1st)) | F3D, F4D/F-6 | Navy Air Trng Unit-Pac: 22 May 1944-6 Apr 1949; NightDevRonPac: 6 Apr 1946-1 Sep 1948; Fighter All Wx Trng Unit Pac: 1 Sep 1948-2 May 1958; VF(AW)-3(2nd): 2 May 1958-April 1936 | NORAD Air Defense Squadron (Note: Redesignated VF(AW)-3 on 2 May 1958 and began operating as a continental air defense squadron under the control of NORAD) | April 1963 |

=== (VSF) Antisubmarine Fighter Squadrons ===
In the 1960s some WWII Essex class aircraft carriers were designated as "Anti-Submarine Carriers" (CVS) and were paired with newly established "Anti-Submarine Carrier Air Groups" (CVSG). CVSGs consisted of squadrons of anti-submarine fixed wing aircraft and helicopters along with a detachment of airborne early warning aircraft and one of A-4 Skyhawks for defense of the carrier and air group. There were two Anti-Submarine Fighter (VSF) squadrons established between 1965 and 1967 for this role but in practice most of the A-4 dets were sourced from Navy or USMC attack (VA/VMA) squadrons and the two VSF squadrons sometimes deployed as attack squadrons. Most of the CVSGs were disestablished by 1970 and these squadrons with them. (Note: All squadron information in this section is from the "Skyhawk Association" website at)

- VSF-1: Established 1 July 1965, disestablished 1 January 1970.

| Designation | Insignia | Nickname | Aircraft | Lineage | Notes | Disestablished |
|---|---|---|---|---|---|---|
| VSF-1 | | Warhawks | A-4 | VSF-1: 1 Jul 1965–1 Jan 1970 | Established to provide dets to CVSGs (Note: Provided detachments of four aircraft to Antisubmarine Carrier Air Groups (CVSGR) for air defense of the Anti-Submarine Warfare Aircraft Carrier (CVS) which embarked an airwing of S-2 Trackers, H-34 or H-3 Helicopters, E-1 Tracers and A-4 Skyhawks in an air defense role) | 1970 |

- VSF-3: Established in March 1967, disestablished 9 February 1968.

| Designation | Insignia | Nickname | Aircraft | Lineage | Notes | Disestablished |
|---|---|---|---|---|---|---|
| VSF-3 | | Chessmen | A-4 | VSF-2: March 1967–9 Feb 1968 | Established to provide dets to CVSGs (Note: Was "split out" of VSF-1 in 1967 when it had become large enough to be two squadrons) | 9 February 1968 |

U. S. Navy Reserve Squadrons
In 1970 the Navy Reserve established two Antisubmarine Fighter Squadrons, one for each of its two Reserve Antisubmarine Carrier Air Groups (CVSGR-70 and CVSGR-80). They were equipped with A-4 Skyhawks as the active component VSF squadrons had been, the last of which was disestablished the year the two USNR VSF squadrons were established.

- VSF-76: Established 1970, disestablished 1 September 1973.

| Designation | Insignia | Nickname | Aircraft | Lineage | Notes | Disestablished |
|---|---|---|---|---|---|---|
| VSF-76 | | Saints | A-4 | VSF-76: 1970–1 Sep 1973 | VSF squadron of CVSGR-70 | 1 September 1973 |

- VSF-86: Established 1970, disestablished 1 September 1973.

| Designation | Insignia | Nickname | Aircraft | Lineage | Notes | Disestablished |
|---|---|---|---|---|---|---|
| VSF-86 | | Gators | A-4 | VSF-86: 1970–1 Sep 1973 | VSF squadron of CVSGR-80 | 1 September 1973 |

=== (VFA) Fighter Attack/Strike Fighter Squadrons ===
The VFA designation was created in 1980 when the VA squadrons flying the A-7E Corsair II attack aircraft began transitioning to the new F/A-18A Hornet fighter attack aircraft. The designation combined the "F" fighter and "A" attack designations from the VF and VA designations to create the new "Fighter Attack (VFA) Squadron" designation. In 1983 the VFA designation was renamed from "Fighter Attack Squadron" to "Strike Fighter Squadron" and all then existing VFA squadrons were renamed from "Fighter Attack Squadron-____" to "Strike Fighter Squadron-_____".

- VA-67/VA-15(2nd)/VFA-15: Established 1 August 1968, deactivated 31 May 2017.

| Designation | Insignia | Nickname | Aircraft | Lineage | Notes | Deactivated (Note: Chief of Naval Operations Instruction (OPNAVINST) 5030.4E dated March 1998 changed the designation system putting it in line with the system used by the USAF and USMC in that since that date U.S. Navy aircraft squadrons are no longer disestablished, they are instead "deactivated." A deactivated squadron remains in existence, though only "on paper", awaiting possible future "reactivation". Neither its designation nor any previous designations are available for use by a new squadron. A reactivated squadron would trace its lineage back to the squadron's original establishment date, including its inactive period) |
|---|---|---|---|---|---|---|
| VA-67 | | Vulcans | A-7 | VA-67:1 Aug 1968-2 Jun 1969 | Attack squadron of CVW-6 (Note: Established as VA-67 but redesignated VA-15(2nd) before it departed on its first deployment with CVW-6) | |
| VA-15(2nd) | (Note: Adopted both the "Valions" name and the insignia from the disestablished VA-15(1st)) | Valions (Note: Adopted both the "Valions" name and the insignia from the disestablished VA-15(1st)) | A-7 | VA-15(2nd): 2 Jun 1969 – 1 Oct 1986 | | |
| VFA-15 | | Valions | F/A-18A, F/A-18C | VFA-15: 1 Oct 1986-31 May 2017 (Note: (inactive 31 May 2017-present)) | Redesignated a Strike Fighter Sqdn with replacement of the A-7 with the F/A-18 | 31 May 2017 |

- VA-82/VFA-82: Established 1 May 1967, deactivated 30 September 2005.

| Designation | Insignia | Nickname | Aircraft | Lineage | Notes | Deactivated (Note: Chief of Naval Operations Instruction (OPNAVINST) 5030.4E dated March 1998 changed the designation system putting it in line with the system used by the USAF and USMC in that since that date U.S. Navy aircraft squadrons are no longer disestablished, they are instead "deactivated." A deactivated squadron remains in existence, though only "on paper", awaiting possible future "reactivation". Neither its designation nor any previous designations are available for use by a new squadron. A reactivated squadron would trace its lineage back to the squadron's original establishment date, including its inactive period) |
|---|---|---|---|---|---|---|
| VA-82 | | Marauders | A-7 | VA-82: 1 May 1967 – 13 Jul 1987 | Attack squadron of CVW-6 | |
| VFA-82 | | Marauders | F/A-18A, F/A-18C | VFA-82: 13 Jul 1987-30 Sep 2005 (Note: (inactive 30 Sep 2005-present)) | Redesignated a Strike Fighter Sqdn with replacement of the A-7 with the F/A-18 | 30 September 2005 |

- VF-101/VFA-101: Established 1 May 1952, deactivated 1 July 2019

| Designation | Insignia | Nickname | Aircraft | Lineage | Notes | Deactivated (Note: Chief of Naval Operations Instruction (OPNAVINST) 5030.4E dated March 1998 changed the designation system putting it in line with the system used by the USAF and USMC in that since that date U.S. Navy aircraft squadrons are no longer disestablished, they are instead "deactivated." A deactivated squadron remains in existence, though only "on paper", awaiting possible future "reactivation". Neither its designation nor any previous designations are available for use by a new squadron. A reactivated squadron would trace its lineage back to the squadron's original establishment date, including its inactive period) |
|---|---|---|---|---|---|---|
| VF-101 | (Note: Adopted insignia from WWII VF-10) | Grim Reapers (Note: Adopted "Grim Reapers" name from WWII VF-10) | FG-1, F2H, F4D, F3H/F-3, F4H/F-4, F-14 | VF-101: 1 May 1952 – 30 Sep 2005 (Note: established 1 May 1952, "deactivated" 30 Sep 2005) | 1st Fighter Squadron of CVG-10(2nd) (Note: Established as one of CVG-10(2nd)'s initial squadrons, however it never deployed with CVG-10 and was moved to CVG-1 (without being redesignated) in 1954. Transferred to Readiness Carrier Air Group 4 (RCVG-4) in 1958 (without being redesignated) and operated as a FRS from Apr 1958 to 30 Sep 2005. The squadron was deactivated on 30 Sep 2005) | |
| VFA-101 | | Grim Reapers | F-35C | VFA-101: 1 May 2012 – 1 July 2019 (Note: "reactivated" 1 May 2012, "deactivated" for a second time 1 July 2019) | F-35C FRS (Note: Based at Eglin Air Force Base with the USAF 33rd Fighter Wing which was designated as a Tri-Service (USN, USMC, USAF) training wing for the USN F-35C, the USMC F-35B and the USAF F-35A. VF-101 was first deactivated on 30 Sep 2005 as an F-14 FRS then reactivated and redesignated VFA-101 as a F-35C FRS on 1 May 2012. It was deactivated a second time (as an F-35C FRS) on 1 July 2019) | 1 July 2019 |

- VA-127/VFA-127: Established 15 June 1962, disestablished 23 March 1996.

| Designation | Insignia | Nickname | Aircraft | Lineage | Notes | Disestablished |
|---|---|---|---|---|---|---|
| VA-127 | (Note: (1980)) | Royal Blues, Cylons (Note: (1981)) | F9F-8T/TF-9, A-4, TA-4 | VA-127: 15 Jun 1962 – 1 Mar 1987 | (Note: Established from VA-126 detachment Alfa to provide advanced instrument training and jet transition training and assigned to RCVG-12. 1 June 1970 Became an A-4 FRS until 1975 when it began providing basic refresher instrument training, jet transition training, and Air Combat Maneuvering (ACM) training. On 1 Oct 1983 became strictly an "Adversary" squadron providing ACM training to fleet squadrons.) | |
| VFA-127 | | Cyclones | T-38B, QT-38A, F-5E/F, F/A-18A | VFA-127: 1 Mar 1987-23 Mar 1996 | Adversary squadron | 23 March 1996 |

- VFA-132: Established 3 January 1984, disestablished 1 June 1992.

| Designation | Insignia | Nickname | Aircraft | Lineage | Notes | Disestablished |
|---|---|---|---|---|---|---|
| VFA-132 | | Privateers | F/A-18A | VFA-132: 3 Jan 1984-1 Jun 1992 | | 1 June 1992 |

- VF-161/VFA-161: Established 1 September 1960, disestablished 1 April 1988.

| Designation | Insignia | Nickname | Aircraft | Lineage | Notes | Disestablished |
|---|---|---|---|---|---|---|
| VF-161 | | Chargers | F3H/F-3, F-4 | VF-161: 1 Sep 1960 – 1 Jun 1986 | 1st Fighter Squadron of CVG-16(2nd) | |
| VFA-161 | | Chargers | F/A-18A | VFA-161: 1 Jun 1986-1 Apr 1988 | Redesignated a Strike Fighter Sqdn with replacement of the F-4 with the F/A-18A | 1 April 1988 |

U. S. Navy Reserve Squadrons
The squadrons listed below were established as Fighter (VF) or Attack (VA) squadrons of the Navy Reserve's Reserve Carrier Air Wing TWENTY (CVWR-20) or Reserve Carrier Air Wing THIRTY (CVWR-30) and were ultimately redesignated Strike Fighter Squadrons when they received the F/A-18 Hornet.

- VF-201/VFA-201(2nd): Established 25 July 1970, deactivated 30 June 2007

| Designation | Insignia | Nickname | Aircraft | Lineage | Notes | Deactivated (Note: Chief of Naval Operations Instruction (OPNAVINST) 5030.4E dated March 1998 changed the designation system putting it in line with the system used by the USAF and USMC in that since that date U.S. Navy aircraft squadrons are no longer disestablished, they are instead "deactivated." A deactivated squadron remains in existence, though only "on paper", awaiting possible future "reactivation". Neither its designation nor any previous designations are available for use by a new squadron. A reactivated squadron would trace its lineage back to the squadron's original establishment date, including its inactive period) |
|---|---|---|---|---|---|---|
| VF-201 | | Hunters | F-8, F-4, F-14 | VF-201: 25 Jul 1970-Jan 1999 | USNR squadron. 1st Fighter Squadron of CVWR-20 | |
| VFA-201 | | Hunters | F/A-18A | VFA-201: 1 Jan 1999-30 June 2007 (Note: inactive 30 June 2007 to present) | USNR squadron. Redesignated a Strike Fighter Sqdn with replacement of the F-14 with the F/A-18A | 30 June 2007 |

- VA-203/VFA-203: Established 1 July 1970, deactivated 30 June 2004

| Designation | Insignia | Nickname | Aircraft | Lineage | Notes | Deactivated (Note: Chief of Naval Operations Instruction (OPNAVINST) 5030.4E dated March 1998 changed the designation system putting it in line with the system used by the USAF and USMC in that since that date U.S. Navy aircraft squadrons are no longer disestablished, they are instead "deactivated." A deactivated squadron remains in existence, though only "on paper", awaiting possible future "reactivation". Neither its designation nor any previous designations are available for use by a new squadron. A reactivated squadron would trace its lineage back to the squadron's original establishment date, including its inactive period) |
|---|---|---|---|---|---|---|
| VA-203 | | Blue Dolphins | A-4, A-7 | VA-203: 1 Jul 1970-1 Oct 1989 | USNR squadron. Attack Squadron of (CVWR-20) | |
| VFA-203 | | Blue Dolphins | F/A-18A | VFA-203: 1 Oct 1989-30 Jun 2004 (Note: (inactive 30 Jun 2004-present)) | USNR squadron. Redesignated a Strike Fighter Sqdn with replacement of the A-7 with the F/A-18A | 30 June 2004 |

- VA-303/VFA-303: Established 1 July 1970, disestablished 31 December 1994

| Designation | Insignia | Nickname | Aircraft | Lineage | Notes | Disestablished |
|---|---|---|---|---|---|---|
| VA-303 | | Golden Hawks | A-4, A-7 | VA-303: 1 Jul 1970 - 1 Jan 1984 | USNR Squadron. Established as part of (CVWR-30) | |
| VFA-303 | | Golden Hawks | F/A-18A | VFA-303: 1 Jan 1984-31 Dec 1994 | USNR Squadron. Redesignated a Strike Fighter Sqdn with replacement of the A-7 with the F/A-18A | 31 December 1994 |

- VA-305/VFA-305: Established 1 July 1970, disestablished 31 December 1994

| Designation | Insignia | Nickname | Aircraft | Lineage | Notes | Disestablished |
|---|---|---|---|---|---|---|
| VA-305 | (Note: (1971)) (Note: (1974)) | Hackers (Note: (1971)); Lobos (Note: (1974)) | A-4, A-7 | VA-305: 1 Jul 1970-1 Jan 1987 | USNR Squadron. Established as part of (CVWR-30) | |
| VFA-305 | | Lobos | F/A-18A | VFA-305: 1 Jan 1987-31 Dec 1994 | USNR Squadron. Redesignated a Strike Fighter Sqdn with replacement of the A-7 with the F/A-18A | 31 December 1994 |

== Logistics and Refueling Squadrons ==
Logistics is the critical function of supporting operational forces. Naval forces cannot sustain themselves at sea or conduct combat operations without logistical support, and logistics squadrons have existed in various forms since the 'VR' designation was first created in 1942 to designate "Transport Squadron" or "Air Transport Squadron" or "Fleet Logistic Air Squadron". Also critical to Naval Aviation since the mid 20th century is the ability to deliver fuel in mid air to combat aircraft of the carrier air wings. With the exception of two Navy Reserve squadrons which existed in the 1970s the Navy has not operated aerial refueling squadrons instead using aircraft of other type squadrons modified for the tanker role. First North American AJ Savage and Douglas A-3 Skywarrior variants flown by "Heavy Attack" (VAH) squadrons, followed by the EKA-3 variant of the Skywarrior flown by "Tactical Electronic Warfare" (VAQ) squadrons, the KA-6 variant of the Grumman A-6 Intruder flown by "Attack" (VA) squadrons, the Lockheed S-3B Viking flown by "Sea Control" (VS) squadrons and finally the F/A-18E Super Hornet flown by today's "Strike Fighter" (VFA) squadrons.

=== (VAK) Tactical Aerial Refueling Squadrons ===
In 1970 the Navy Reserve established two Tactical Electronic Warfare squadrons for its two Reserve Carrier Air Wings (CVWR-20 and CVWR-30). They were equipped with the KA-3B Skywarrior which was a tanker aircraft that the active Navy VAQ squadrons had been operating and were equipping with Electronic Countermeasures (ECM) equipment converting them to an EKA-3B variant. The aircraft of these two squadrons however were never converted to the EKA-3B variant and operated only as tankers and carrier on board delivery (COD) aircraft. On 1 October 1979 they were redesignated to Tactical Aerial Refueling Squadron TWO-ZERO-EIGHT (VAK-208) and Tactical Aerial Refueling Squadron THREE-ZERO-EIGHT (VAK-308) in recognition of the actual role of the squadrons.

- VAQ-208/VAK-208: Established 31 July 1970, disestablished 30 September 1989

| Designation | Insignia | Nickname | Aircraft | Lineage | Notes | Disestablished |
|---|---|---|---|---|---|---|
| VAQ-208 | | Jockeys | KA-3B | VAQ-208: 31 Jul 1970-1 Oct 1979 | U S Navy Reserve squadron | |
| VAK-208 | | Jockeys | KA-3B | VAK-208: 1 Oct 1979-30 Sep 1989 | U S Navy Reserve squadron | 30 September 1989 |

- VAQ-308/VAK-308: Established 2 May 1970, disestablished 30 September 1988

| Designation | Insignia | Nickname | Aircraft | Lineage | Notes | Disestablished |
|---|---|---|---|---|---|---|
| VAQ-308 | | Griffins | KA-3B | VAQ-308: 2 May 1970-1 Oct 1979 | U S Navy Reserve Squadron | |
| VAK-308 | | Griffins | KA-3B | VAK-308: 1 Oct 1979-30 Sep 1988 | U S Navy Reserve Squadron | 30 September 1989 |

=== (VRC) Fleet Tactical Support/Fleet Logistics Support Squadrons ===
The VRC squadron designation first appeared in 1960 with the establishment of VRC-40 which was established in the Atlantic Fleet to operate the Grumman C-1A Trader "Carrier Onboard Delivery" (COD) aircraft. At the same time, VR-21 which was a large Pacific Fleet logistics squadron with detachments throughout the Pacific and Western Pacific was operating COD aircraft in that Fleet alongside its traditional land based logistics aircraft. In 1960 when the VRC designation was created for VRC-40 the already existing VR designation designated "Fleet Tactical Support" squadron and the new VRC designation was given the same name with both VR and VRC then designating "Fleet Tactical Support" squadron. In 1966 two of VR-21s detachments which flew COD aircraft were established as separate squadrons with one of them receiving the VR (VR-30) designation and the other the VRC (VRC-50) designation. In 1976 both the VR and the VRC designations were changed to "Fleet Logistics Support" squadron. In 1978 VR-30 was redesignated VRC-30 and the three COD squadrons (two Pacific Fleet and one Atlantic Fleet) all then carried the VRC designation. The three squadrons continued to operate both land based logistics aircraft and carrier capable CODs until 1990 when they became COD squadrons only with VRC-50 disestablishing a few years later leaving VRC-30 as the Pacific Fleet COD squadron and VRC-40 as the Atlantic Fleet COD squadron. In 2023 and 2026 those two remaining Fleet Logistics Support (VRC) squadrons were deactivated and replaced by Fleet Logistics Multi-Mission (VRM) squadrons operating the CMV-22B Osprey Carrier Onboard Delivery aircraft. The VRC designation now exists attached only to those two deactivated VRC squadrons.

- VR-30/VRC-30: Established 1 October 1966, deactivated 31 December 2023

Established from VR-21's Alameda detachment.

| Designation | Insignia | Nickname | Aircraft | Lineage | Notes | Deactivated |
|---|---|---|---|---|---|---|
| VR-30 | | Providers | C-131, C-1A, CT-39E, C-9B | VR-30: 1 Oct 1966-1 Oct 1978 | Operated both land based logistics aircraft and Carrier Onboard Delivery (COD) C-1A traders. | |
| VRC-30 | | Providers | C-1A, CT-39E, C-9B, UC-12, C-2A | VRC-30: 1 Oct 1978–31 Dec 2023 | C-2A squadron only by early 1990s (Note: Also operated as the C-12 Fleet Replacement Squadron beginning in 1980, received the C-2A in 1985 and retired the C-1A in 1986, divested of land based aircraft by the early 1990s) | 31 December 2023 |

- VRC-40: Established 1 July 1960, deactivated 31 July 2026

Established as the first primarily Carrier Onboard Delivery (COD) squadron operating the Grumman C-1A Trader

| Designation | Insignia | Nickname | Aircraft | Lineage | Notes | Deactivated |
|---|---|---|---|---|---|---|
| VRC-40 | | Rawhides | C-1A, CT-39E, C-2A | VRC-40: 1 Jul 1960–31 Jul 2026 | Operated the land based CT-39E alongside the C-1A then C-2A from late 1970s to 1990 | 31 July 2026 |

- VRC-50: Established 1 October 1966, disestablished 7 October 1994

Established from VR-21's Atsugi detachment.

| Designation | Insignia | Nickname | Aircraft | Lineage | Notes | Disestablished |
|---|---|---|---|---|---|---|
| VRC-50 | | Foo-Dogs | C-1A, C-2A, CT-39E, C-130F, US-3A | VRC-50: 1 Oct 1966-7 Oct 1994 | Operated Carrier Onboard Delivery (COD) dets and land based logistics aircraft (Note: This is the only squadron to have operated the US-3 COD variant of the S-3 Viking) | 7 October 1994 |

=== (VR) Fleet Logistics Support Squadrons ===
The VR designation was first used in 1948 to designate Transport or Air Transport or Fleet Logistics Air squadrons. In 1958 the name of the designation was changed to Fleet Tactical Support squadron and in 1976 it was again changed to Fleet Logistics Support squadrons as it remains today.

| Squadron Designation | Insignia | Nickname | Aircraft | Deactivated | Notes |
|---|---|---|---|---|---|
| VR-46 | | Eagles | McDonnell Douglas C-9 | Summer 2012 | USNR; NAS JRB Fort Worth |
| VR-48 | | Capital Skyliners | C-20G | | USNR; Joint Base Andrews |
| VR-52 | | Taskmasters | McDonnell Douglas C-9 | Summer 2012 | USNR; Joint Base McGuire, Dix, Lakehurst |

== Reconnaissance Squadrons ==
There has always been a need to collect information to support planning and execution at the tactical, operational and/or strategic levels of warfare. From the earliest "Observing" or "Spotting" squadrons of the 1920s which used binoculars and plotters for information gathering for Naval Gunfire, to the most sophisticated signals and communications intelligence gathering technologies of "Fleet Air Reconnaissance" squadrons, the Navy through the decades of the 20th century established various types of squadrons for the purpose of information gathering in support of all aspects of naval operations.

=== (VO) Spotting or Observation Squadrons ===
The VO designation, one of the U.S. Navy's earliest, first appeared in 1922 to designate "Spotting Squadron" that spotted targets for naval gunfire from battleships and cruisers. In 1923 the designation was changed to "Observation Plane Squadron" or "Observation Squadron". The designation was discontinued in 1945, but resurrected from 1947 to 1949 and again during the Vietnam War from 1967 to 1968.

This last use of the VO designation designated a single squadron established for a special mission during the Vietnam War. The designation has not been used since.

- VO-67: Established in February 1967, disestablished 1 July 1968.

| Designation | Insignia | Nickname | Aircraft | Lineage | Disestablished |
|---|---|---|---|---|---|
| VO-67 | | Gandydancers | OP-2E | VO-67: Feb 1967-1 Jul 1968 | 1 July 1968 |

=== (VC)(VFP)(VJ)(VAP)(VCP) Photographic Reconnaissance Squadrons ===
(VC) Composite Squadron (Photographic Reconnaissance), (VFP) Light Photographic Reconnaissance Squadron, and (VCP) Composite Photographic Reconnaissance Squadron

In 1949 two Photographic Reconnaissance Squadrons were established as "Composite" squadrons VC-61 and VC-62. From 1948 to 1956 the Navy designated land based squadrons which provided detachments of specialized aircraft to Carrier Air Groups "Composite Squadrons". These specialized functions were: All-Weather/Night Fighter; All Weather Attack; Heavy Attack (Nuclear Bombers); Airborne Early Warning; Anti-Submarine Warfare; and Photographic Reconnaissance. By 1956 these squadrons were all redesignated with new descriptive designations and the VC Photographic Reconnaissance Squadrons were redesignated "Light Photographic Reconnaissance" (VFP) squadrons. These VFP squadrons flew aircraft carrier based aircraft that deployed in detachments with Carrier Air Groups.

From 1959 to 1961 one of the Light Photographic Reconnaissance Squadrons was designated a "Composite Photographic Reconnaissance" (VCP) squadron. This squadron flew both small carrier based type and large land based type aircraft and provided both aircraft carrier based and land based detachments.

- VC-61/VFP-61/VCP-63/VFP-63: Established 20 January 1949, disestablished 30 June 1984.

| Designation | Insignia | Nickname | Aircraft | Lineage | Notes | Disestablished |
|---|---|---|---|---|---|---|
| VC-61 | | Eyes Of The Fleet | F8F-2P, F4U-4P/5P, F9F-2P/5P, F9F-6P/8P, F2H-2P | VC-61: 20 Jan 1949 – 2 Jul 1956 | Composite Sqdn (Photo Recon) (VC) | |
| VFP-61 | | Eyes Of The Fleet | F2H-2P, F9F-2P,6P | VFP-61:2 Jul 1956-1 Jul 1959 | Light Photo Recon Sqdn (VFP) | |
| VCP-63 | | Eyes Of The Fleet | F8U-1P, A3D-2P | VCP-63: 1 Jul 1959-1 Jul 1961 | Composite Photo Recon Sqdn (VCP) | |
| VFP-63 | | Eyes Of The Fleet | F8U-1P/RF-8A, RF-8G | VFP-63: 1 Jul 1961 – 30 Jun 1984 | Light Photo Recon Sqdn (VFP) (Note: F-8 Fleet Replacement Squadron from 1982 to disestablishment) | 30 June 1984 |

- VC-62/VFP-62: Established 3 January 1949, disestablished 5 January 1968.

| Designation | Insignia | Nickname | Aircraft | Lineage | Notes | Disestablished |
|---|---|---|---|---|---|---|
| VC-62 | | Fighting Photos | F8F-2P, F4U-5P | VC-62: 3 Jan 1949 – 2 Jul 1956 | Composite Sqdn (Photo Recon) (VC) | |
| VFP-62 | | Fighting Photos | F9F-6P, F9F-8P, F8U-1P/RF-8A, RF-8G | VFP-62: 2 Jul 1956 – 5 Jan 1968 | Light Photo Recon Sqdn (VFP) | 5 January 1968 |

(VJ) Photographic Squadron, (VAP) Heavy Photographic Reconnaissance Squadron, and (VCP) Composite Photographic Reconnaissance Squadron

In 1952 one Patrol (VP) squadron was redesignated as a Photographic Reconnaissance squadron and a new squadron was established equipped with large land based multi-engine aircraft. These squadrons were designated "Photographic" (VJ) squadrons. In 1956 when VC-61 and VC-62 were redesignated "Light Photographic Reconnaissance" (VFP) squadrons the VJ squadrons which were VJ-61 and VJ-62 were redesignated "Heavy Photographic Reconnaissance" (VAP) squadrons.

From 1959 to 1969 one of the Heavy Photographic Reconnaissance Squadrons was designated a "Composite Photographic Reconnaissance" (VCP) squadron. This squadron flew both small carrier based type and large land based type aircraft and provided both aircraft carrier based and land based detachments.

- VP-61/VJ-61/VAP-61(1st)/VCP-61/VAP-61(2nd): Established 20 January 1951, disestablished 1 July 1971.

| Designation | Insignia | Nickname | Aircraft | Lineage | Notes | Disestablished |
|---|---|---|---|---|---|---|
| VP-61 | | | P4Y-1P | VP-61: 20 Jan 1951-5 Mar 1952 | Patrol Sqdn (VP) | |
| VJ-61 | | World Recorders | P4Y-1P, AJ-2P | VJ-61: 5 Mar 1952-Apr 1956 | Photographic Sqdn (VJ) | |
| VAP-61(1st) | | World Recorders | AJ-2P | VAP-61(1st): Apr 1956-1 Jul 1959 | Heavy Photo Recon Sqdn (VAP) | |
| VCP-61 | | World Recorders | F8U-1P, A3D-2P | VCP-61: 1 Jul 1959-1 Jul 1969 | Composite Photo Recon Sqdn (VCP) | |
| VAP-61(2nd) | | World Recorders | A3D-2P/RA-3B, KA-3B | VAP-61(2nd): 1 Jul 1961-1 July 1971 | Heavy Photo Recon Sqdn (VAP) | 1 July 1971 |

- VJ-62/VAP-62: Established 10 April 1952, disestablished 15 October 1969.

| Designation | Insignia | Nickname | Aircraft | Lineage | Notes | Disestablished |
|---|---|---|---|---|---|---|
| VJ-62 | | | P4Y-1P, AJ-2P, F7F-4N | VJ-62: 10 Apr 1952-2 Jul 1956 | Photographic Sqdn (VJ) | |
| VAP-62 | | Tigers | F7F-4N, A3D-1P, A3D-2P/RA-3B | VAP-62: 2 Jul 1956 – 15 Oct 1969 | Heavy Photo Recon Sqdn (VAP) | 15 October 1969 |

U. S. Navy Reserve Squadrons
In 1970 the Navy Reserve established two Light Photographic Reconnaissance squadrons for its two Reserve Carrier Air Wings (CVWR-20 and CVWR-30).

- VFP-206: Established 1 June 1970, disestablished 30 March 1987

| Designation | Insignia | Nickname | Aircraft | Lineage | Notes | Disestablished |
|---|---|---|---|---|---|---|
| VFP-206 | | Hawkeyes | RF-8G | VFP-206: 1 Jun 1970 – 20 Mar 1987 | U.S. Navy Reserve (Note: CVWR-20) | 20 March 1987 |

- VFP-306: Established 1 June 1970, disestablished 30 September 1984

| Designation | Insignia | Nickname | Aircraft | Lineage | Notes | Disestablished |
|---|---|---|---|---|---|---|
| VFP-306 | | Photomasters | RF-8G | VFP-306: 1 Jun 1970 – 30 Sep 1984 | U.S. Navy Reserve (Note: CVWR-30) | 30 September 1984 |

=== (VJ)(VW) Weather Reconnaissance Squadrons ===
From 1952 to 1953, VJ designated "Weather" or "Weather Reconnaissance" squadron (it also at the same time, from 1952 to 1956 designated "Photographic" Squadron). Beginning in 1953 there was no designation for weather reconnaissance squadron and squadrons which performed that role were designated "Airborne Early Warning" (VW) squadrons along with actual airborne early warning squadrons. By 1967 there were only two VW squadrons remaining which were the Pacific Fleet's VW-1 "Typhoon Trackers" which retained the "Airborne Early Warning" (VW) designation and the Atlantic Fleet's VW-4 "Hurricane Hunters" which at that time was redesignated a "Weather Reconnaissance" (VW) squadron. VW-1 was disestablished in 1971 leaving Weather Reconnaissance Squadron 4 (VW-4) the last squadron to carry the VW designation until it was disestablished in 1975.

- VJ-1/VW-3: Established 19 March 1952, disestablished 3 June 1960.

After redesignation as an airborne early warning squadron (VW) it continued to perform hurricane hunting and weather reconnaissance as a secondary role until it was disestablished.

| Designation | Insignia | Nickname | Aircraft | Lineage | Notes | Disestablished |
|---|---|---|---|---|---|---|
| VJ-1 | | | P4Y-2S | VJ-1: 19 Mar 1952-3 Sep 1953 | Weather Reconnaissance Squadron (Note: Pacific Fleet typhoon hunting squadron) | |
| VW-3 | | | P4Y-2S, P2V-5JF, WV-3, WV-2 | VW-3: Sep 1953-Jun 1960 | Airborne Early Warning Squadron (Note: Pacific Fleet Early Warning squadron with secondary weather reconnaissance and typhoon hunting role) | June 1960 |

- VJ-2/VW-4: Established 15 November 1952, disestablished 30 April 1975.

After redesignation as an airborne early warning squadron (VW) it continued as a hurricane hunter and weather reconnaissance squadron with secondary roles in tracking space launches and other support to NASA. It was redesignated a weather reconnaissance squadron (retaining the 'VW' designation) on 1 March 1967 as that described the squadron's primary role.

| Designation | Insignia | Nickname | Aircraft | Lineage | Notes | Disestablished |
|---|---|---|---|---|---|---|
| VJ-2 | | Hurricane Hunters | P2V-3W | VJ-2: 15 Nov 1952–1953 | Weather Reconnaissance Squadron (Note: Hurricane early warning squadron.) | |
| VW-4 | | Hurricane Hunters | P2V-3W, PO-1W/WV-1, P2V-5JF, WV-3/WC-121N, WP-3A | VW-4: 1953-30 Apr 1975 | Airborne Early Warning (VW) Squadron until 1 March 1967, then Weather Reconnaissance (VW) Squadron until disestablishment (Note: Hurricane early warning squadron. Also tracked Mercury launches and provided other support to NASA. Redesignated "Weather Reconnaissance Squadron FOUR" (VW-4) on 1 March 1967 to more accurately describe the primary mission of the squadron.) | 30 April 1975 |

- VW-1 Established 18 June 1952, disestablished in July 1971.

Established as one of the first two Airborne Early Warning (VW) squadrons. In July 1961 the squadron's primary mission was changed to weather reconnaissance while retaining airborne early warning as a secondary task and it began operations as a typhoon early warning squadron known as the "Typhoon Trackers"

| Designation | Insignia | Nickname | Aircraft | Lineage | Notes | Disestablished |
|---|---|---|---|---|---|---|
| VW-1 | | Typhoon Trackers (Note: (1961)) | PB-1W, PO-1W/WV-1, WV-2/EC-121K, R7V-1/C-121J, WV-3/WC-121N | VW-1: 18 Jun 1952-Jul 1971 | Airborne Early Warning Squadron | July 1971 |

=== (VQ) Fleet Air Reconnaissance Squadrons ===
In 1955 two "Electronic Countermeasures" (VQ) Squadrons were established, one in the Atlantic Fleet and one in the Pacific Fleet. These squadrons operated both land based multi-engine aircraft equipped with Electronic Countermeasures (jamming) equipment and an aircraft carrier capable aircraft to provide detachments to Carrier Air Groups. In 1960 the 'VQ' designation was changed to "Fleet Air Reconnaissance" squadron to reflect the fact that by then the aircraft had been equipped to collect communications and other electronic signals for intelligence purposes rather than simply jamming them.

- VQ-1: Established 1 September 1955, deactivated 30 March 2025 .

Redesignated from "Electronic Countermeasures" (VQ) to "Fleet Air Reconnaissance" (VQ) squadron on 1 January 1960. Operated land based reconnaissance aircraft. Also provided detachments of reconnaissance aircraft to carrier air groups (carrier air wings after December 1963) until late 1989.

| Designation | Insignia | Nickname | Aircraft | Lineage | Notes | Deactivated |
|---|---|---|---|---|---|---|
| VQ-1 | | World Watchers | A3D-2Q/EA-3B, WV-2Q/EC-121M, EP-3E | VQ-1: 1 Jun 1955-30 March 2025 | Operated land based Comint/Elint aircraft and provided detachments of EA-3Bs to carrier air wings | 30 March 2025 |

- VQ-2: Established 1 September 1955, deactivated 22 May 2012 .

Redesignated from "Electronic Countermeasures" (VQ) to "Fleet Air Reconnaissance" (VQ) squadron on 1 January 1960. Operated land based reconnaissance aircraft. Also provided detachments of reconnaissance aircraft to carrier air groups (carrier air wings after December 1963) until late 1989.

| Designation | Insignia | Nickname | Aircraft | Lineage | Notes | Deactivated |
|---|---|---|---|---|---|---|
| VQ-2 | | Rangers | A3D-2Q/EA-3B, WV-2Q/EC-121M, EP-3E | VQ-1: 1 Jun 1955-22 May 2012 | Operated land based Comint/Elint aircraft and provided detachments of EA-3Bs to carrier air wings | 22 May 2012 |

- VQ-5: Established 15 April 1991, deactivated 30 July 1999.

| Designation | Insignia | Nickname | Aircraft | Lineage | Notes | Deactivated |
|---|---|---|---|---|---|---|
| VQ-5 | | Sea Shadows | ES-3A | VQ-5: 15 Apr 1991-30 Jul 1999 | Provided Comint/Elint dets to Carrier Air Wings after VQ-1 ceased operating the EA-3B | 30 July 1999 |

- VQ-6: Established 5 August 1991, deactivated 30 September 1999.

| Designation | Insignia | Nickname | Aircraft | Lineage | Notes | Deactivated |
|---|---|---|---|---|---|---|
| VQ-6 | | Black Ravens | ES-3A | VQ-6: 5 Aug 1991-30 Sep 1999 | Provided Comint/Elint dets to Carrier Air Wings after VQ-2 ceased operating the EA-3B | 30 September 1999 |

- VQ-11: Established 1 July 1997, deactivated 331 March 2000.

United States Navy Reserve squadron. Though it was designated a "Fleet Air Reconnaissance" (VQ) squadron it did not operate as a reconnaissance squadron. It provided electronic "aggressor" services simulating hostile radar and communications jamming for fleet training.

| Designation | Insignia | Nickname | Aircraft | Lineage | Notes | Deactivated |
|---|---|---|---|---|---|---|
| VQ-11 | | Bandits | EP-3J | VQ-11: 1 Jul 1997-31 Mar 2000 | U S Navy Reserve Squadron (Note: The squadron was established from a detachment of USNR VP-66 which had been formed in 1993 to assume the electronic aggressor role from VAQ-33 which was disestablished. On 1 July 1997 the detachment was established as this squadron and continued in the electronic aggressor role until it was deactivated leaving to role to contracted services) | 31 March 2000 |

=== (RVAH) Reconnaissance Attack Squadrons ===
In 1964 the Navy ended its involvement with manned strategic nuclear bombing in favor of developing submarine ballistic missile capabilities. From 1964 through 1966 all Atlantic Fleet Heavy Attack (VAH) squadrons transitioned to a photographic reconnaissance variant of the A-5 Vigilante and were redesignated "Reconnaissance Attack" (RVAH) squadrons. There were also five Pacific Fleet Heavy Attack squadrons all of which retained the VAH designation but their A-3 attack aircraft were converted to KA-3 refueling tankers and the squadrons were disestablished or redesignated to Tactical Electronic Warfare (VAQ) squadrons by 1971.

All RVAH squadrons fell under the administrative control of the Atlantic Fleet's Reconnaissance Attack Wing ONE but squadrons were deployed with Carrier Air Wings of both the Atlantic and Pacific Fleets. Attrition of airframes and the increasing maintenance and flight hour costs of the RA-5C resulted in the incremental retirement of the RA-5C and sunset the RVAH community beginning in mid-1974. The RVAH designation was retired in 1979 with the disestablishment of the last RVAH squadron.

Six of the eight Atlantic Fleet VAH squadrons were redesignated to RVAH from May through December 1964.

- VC-5(2nd)/VAH-5/RVAH-5-11: Established 9 September 1948, disestablished 30 September 1977.

| Designation | Insignia | Nickname | Aircraft | Lineage | Notes | Disestablished |
|---|---|---|---|---|---|---|
| VC-5(2nd) | | Savage Sons | P2V-3C, AJ-1,2 | VC-5(2nd): 9 Sep 1948 – 1 Nov 1955 | Nuclear Bomber squadron | |
| VAH-5 | | Savage Sons | AJ-2, A3D-2/A-3B | VAH-5: 1 Nov 1955-May 1964 | Redesignated Heavy Attack (VAH) | |
| RVAH-5 | | Savage Sons | RA-5C | RVAH-5: May 1964-30 Sep 1977 | Photo Reconnaissance squadron (Note: with relinquishment of the nuclear bomber role to the USAF Atlantic Fleet VAH squadrons were redesignated Reconnaissance Attack (RVAH)) | 30 September 1977 |

- VC-9(2nd)/VAH-9/RVAH-9: Established 15 January 1953, disestablished 30 September 1977.

| Designation | Insignia | Nickname | Aircraft | Lineage | Notes | Disestablished |
|---|---|---|---|---|---|---|
| VC-9(2nd) | | Hoot Owls | AJ-2 | VC-9(2nd): 15 Jan 1953 – 1 Nov 1955 | Nuclear Bomber squadron | |
| VAH-9 | | Hoot Owls | AJ-2, A3D-2/A-3B, RA-5C | VAH-9: 1 Nov 1955 – 3 Jun 1964 | Redesignated Heavy Attack (VAH) | |
| RVAH-9 | | Hoot Owls | RA-5C | RVAH-9: 3 Jun 1964-30 Sep 1977 | Photo Reconnaissance squadron (Note: with relinquishment of the nuclear bomber role to the USAF Atlantic Fleet VAH squadrons were redesignated Reconnaissance Attack (RVAH)) | 30 September 1977 |

- VAH-3/RVAH-3: Established 14 June 1956, disestablished 19 August 1979.

| Designation | Insignia | Nickname | Aircraft | Lineage | Notes | Disestablished |
|---|---|---|---|---|---|---|
| VAH-3 | | Sea Dragons | A3D-1, A3D-2/A-3B, A3D-2T/TA-3B, R4D-7/TC-47K, P2V-3B/P-2C, F9F-8T/TF-9J, A3J-1/A-5A, RA-5C | VAH-3: 14 Jun 1956 – 1 Jul 1964 | Atlantic Fleet A-3 FRS beginning in 1958. (Note: In mid-1958, the squadron was merged with Heavy Attack Training Unit Atlantic (HATULANT) and designated as the Atlantic Fleet AD3 Fleet Replacement Squadron (FRS).) | |
| RVAH-3 | | Sea Dragons | TA-3B, TA-4F, TA-4J, RA-5C | RVAH-3: 1 Jul 1964-17 August 1979 | Sole RA-5C FRS | 17 August 1979 |

- VAH-1/RVAH-1: Established 1 November 1955, disestablished 29 January 1979.

| Designation | Insignia | Nickname | Aircraft | Lineage | Notes | Disestablished |
|---|---|---|---|---|---|---|
| VAH-1 | | Tigers | A3D-1, A3D-2/A-3B, A-5A | VAH-1: 1 Nov 1955 – 1 Sep 1964 | | |
| RVAH-1 | | Smokin' Tigers | RA-5C | RVAH-1: 1 Sep 1964-29 Jan 1979 | Photo Reconnaissance squadron (Note: with relinquishment of the nuclear bomber role to the USAF Atlantic Fleet VAH squadrons were redesignated Reconnaissance Attack (RVAH)) | 29 January 1979 |

- VAH-13/RVAH-13: Established 3 January 1961, disestablished 30 June 1976.

| Designation | Insignia | Nickname | Aircraft | Lineage | Notes | Disestablished |
|---|---|---|---|---|---|---|
| VAH-13 | | Bats | A3D-2/A-3B | VAH-13: 3 Jan 1961 – 1 Nov 1964 | | |
| RVAH-13 | | Bats | RA-5C | RVAH-13: 1 Nov 1964-30 Jun 1976 | Photo Reconnaissance squadron (Note: with relinquishment of the nuclear bomber role to the USAF Atlantic Fleet VAH squadrons were redesignated Reconnaissance Attack (RVAH)) | 30 June 1976 |

- VC-7(2nd)/VAH-7/RVAH-7: Established 10 August 1950, disestablished 28 September 1979.

| Designation | Insignia | Nickname | Aircraft | Lineage | Notes | Disestablished |
|---|---|---|---|---|---|---|
| VC-7(2nd) | | Peacemakers of the Fleet | AJ-1,2 | VC-7(2nd): 10 Aug 1950 – 1 Nov 1955 | Nuclear Bomber squadron | |
| VAH-7 | | Peacemakers of the Fleet | AJ-2, A3D-2, A3J-1/A-5A | VAH-7: 1 Nov 1955 – 1 Dec 1964 | Redesignated Heavy Attack (VAH) | |
| RVAH-7 | | Peacemakers of the Fleet | RA-5C | RVAH-7: 1 Dec 1964-28 Sep 1979 | Photo Reconnaissance squadron (Note: with relinquishment of the nuclear bomber role to the USAF Atlantic Fleet VAH squadrons were redesignated Reconnaissance Attack (RVAH)) | 28 September 1979 |

In 1965 the seventh Atlantic Fleet VAH squadron was redesignated RVAH in September after a new RVAH squadron was established in July.

- RVAH-12: Established 1 July 1965, disestablished 2 July 1979.

| Designation | Insignia | Nickname | Aircraft | Lineage | Notes | Disestablished |
|---|---|---|---|---|---|---|
| RVAH-12 | | Speartips | RA-5C | RVAH-12: 1 Jul 1965-2 Jul 1979 | One of only two squadrons established as a RVAH squadron. | 2 July 1979 |

- VC-6(2nd)/VAH-6/RVAH-6: Established 6 January 1959, disestablished 20 October 1978.

| Designation | Insignia | Nickname | Aircraft | Lineage | Notes | Disestablished |
|---|---|---|---|---|---|---|
| VC-6(2nd) | | Fire Bees, Fleurs | P2V, AJ-2 | VC-6(2nd): 6 Jan 1950 – 1 Jul 1956 | Nuclear Bomber squadron | |
| VAH-6 | | Fleurs | AJ-2, A3D-2/A-3B | VAH-6: 1 Jul 1956 – 23 Sep 1965 | Redesignated Heavy Attack (VAH) | |
| RVAH-6 | | Fleurs | RA-5C | RVAH-6: 23 Sep 1965-20 Oct 1978 | Photo Reconnaissance squadron (Note: with relinquishment of the nuclear bomber role to the USAF Atlantic Fleet VAH squadrons were redesignated Reconnaissance Attack (RVAH)) | 20 October 1978 |

in July 1966 the last of the eight Atlantic Fleet VAH squadrons was redesignated to RVAH.

- VC-8(2nd)/VAH-11/RVAH-11: Established 3 December 1951, disestablished 1 June 1975.

| Designation | Insignia | Nickname | Aircraft | Lineage | Notes | Disestablished |
|---|---|---|---|---|---|---|
| VC-8(2nd) | | Checkertails | P2V-3C, AJ-1,2 | VC-8(2nd): 3 Dec 1951 – 1 Nov 1955 | Nuclear Bomber squadron | |
| VAH-11 | | Checkertails | AJ-2, A3D-2/A-3B | VAH-11: 1 Nov 1955 – 1 Jul 1966 | Redesignated Heavy Attack (VAH) | |
| RVAH-11 | | Checkertails | RA-5C | RVAH-11: 1 Jul 1966-1 Jun 1975 | Photo Reconnaissance squadron (Note: with relinquishment of the nuclear bomber role to the USAF Atlantic Fleet VAH squadrons were redesignated Reconnaissance Attack (RVAH)) | 1 June 1975 |

In 1968 the second of two RVAH squadrons to be established as such and which was the tenth and final RVAH squadron was established.

- RVAH-14: Established 14 February 1968, disestablished 1 May 1976.

| Designation | Insignia | Nickname | Aircraft | Lineage | Notes | Disestablished |
|---|---|---|---|---|---|---|
| RVAH-14 | | Eagle Eyes | RA-5C | RVAH-14: 14 Feb 1968-1 May 1976 | One of only two squadrons established as a RVAH squadron. | 1 May 1976 |

== Experimental, Test, Evaluation or Development Squadrons ==
=== (VX) Experimental and Development Squadrons ===
The VX designation first appeared in 1927 to designate "Experimental Squadron" and was used until 1943. It was used again beginning in 1946 when four "Experimental and Development" squadrons were created to develop and evaluate new equipment and methods. From 1946 to 1968 the designation was variously "Experimental and Development" squadron, "Operational Development" squadron, "Air Operational Development" squadron and "Air Development" squadron. In 1969 the designation changed to "Air Test and Evaluation" squadron and it remains as such today.

In 1946 three Experimental and Development (VX) squadrons were established, and one Patrol (VP) squadron which had been and was still was at the time involved in the development of airborne early warning radar was redesignated as a VX squadron, to develop the emerging technologies which had been invented during WWII. VX-1, VX-2, VX-3(1st) and VX-4(1st) were tasked with the development of airborne anti-submarine technologies, pilotless aircraft and guided missiles, helicopters, and airborne early warning radar respectively. VX-1 can be found listed in List of United States Navy aircraft squadrons which lists current Navy aircraft squadrons and VX-2, VX-3(1st) and VX-4(1st) are listed below

- VX-2: Established 15 March 1946, disestablished in January 1958.

| Designation | Insignia | Nickname | Aircraft | Lineage | Notes | Disestablished |
|---|---|---|---|---|---|---|
| VX-2 | | | Pilotless Aircraft and Guided Missiles | VX-2: 15 Mar 1946-Jan 1958 | Established in 1946 to test and evaluate pilotless aircraft, guided missiles and general electronics. Also provided drone support to gunnery projects and the atomic bomb test program | January 1958 |

- VX-3(1st): Established 1 July 1946, disestablished 1 April 1948.

| Designation | Insignia | Nickname | Aircraft | Lineage | Notes | Disestablished |
|---|---|---|---|---|---|---|
| VX-3(1st) | | | HNS-1, HOS-1, HO3S-1, HTL-1, HRP-1 | VX-3(1st): 1 Jul 1946-1 Apr 1948 | Helicopter Development Squadron. Aircraft and personnel were used to establish the first two U. S. Navy operational helicopter squadrons (HU-1 and HU-2) which were both established on 1 April 1948 | 1 April 1948 |

- VP-11F/VP-11(1st)/VP-54(1st)/VP-51(2nd)/VB-101/VPB-101/VX-4(1st)/VW-2: Established 1 July 1936, disestablished 1 July 1961.

| Designation | Insignia | Nickname | Aircraft | Lineage | Notes | Disestablished |
|---|---|---|---|---|---|---|
| Patrol Squadron (6 designations) | | | | VP-11F: 1 Jul 1936-1 Oct 1937; VP-11(1st): 1 Oct 1937-1 Jul 1939; VP-54(1st): 1 Jul 1939-1 Jul 1941; VP-51(2nd): 1 Jul 1941-1 Mar 1943; VB-101: 1 Mar 1943-1 Oct 1944; VPB-101: 1 Oct 1944-15 May 1946 | In 1945 VPB-101 was assigned to support the development of airborne radar and procedures for early warning. | |
| VX-4(1st) | | | PB-1W, PO-1W/WV-1 | VX-4: 15 May 1946-18 Jun 1952 | Redesignated "Experimental and Development" squadron to develop airborne early warning equipment and procedures. | |
| VW-2 | | | PO-1W/WV-1, WV-2 | VW-2: 18 Jun 1952 – 1 Jul 1961 | Redesignated as one of the first operational Airborne Early Warning Squadrons | 1 July 1961 |

From 1948 to 1952 three more VX squadrons were established. VX-3(2nd) to develop and evaluate high performance jet aircraft, VX-4(2nd) to conduct operational test and evaluation of aircraft carrier based aircraft weapons systems and weapons delivery systems, and VX-5 to develop tactics for employment of airborne weapons from aircraft carrier based aircraft.

- VX-3(2nd): Established 20 November 1948, disestablished 1 March 1960.

| Designation | Insignia | Nickname | Aircraft | Lineage | Notes | Disestablished |
|---|---|---|---|---|---|---|
| VX-3(2nd) | | | F6U, AJ, F9F-6, F8U | VX-3(2nd): 20 Nov 1948-1 Mar 1960 | Squadron was formed by merging VF-1L and VA-1L. Test and evaluation of high performance jet aircraft. Used tailcode XC then JC from 1957 | 1 March 1960 |

- VX-4(2nd): Established 15 September 1952. Its personnel and equipment were merged with those of VX-5 to establish on 30 April 1994 a new squadron designated VX-9 which is still active today. The squadron was formally disestablished on 30 September 1994.

| Designation | Insignia | Nickname | Aircraft | Lineage | Notes | Disestablished |
|---|---|---|---|---|---|---|
| VX-4(2nd) | | Evaluators | F7U, F3D/F-10, FJ, A4D/A-4, F-3H/F-3, F8U/F-8, F-4, F-14, F/A-18 | VX-4(2nd): 15 Sep 1952 -30 Sep 1994 | Established at NAS Point Mugu to conduct operational testing of airborne systems and weapons and develop all weather fighter tactics and employment of air launched guided missiles. | 30 September 1994 (Note: VX-4(2nd) and VX-5 were "consolidated" into a single squadron designated VX-9. VX-9 was established on 30 April 1994 by reassigning VX-4(2nd) and VX-5 aircraft and personnel to it. VX-4(2nd) and VX-5 were then disestablished on 30 September 1994) |

- VX-5: Established 18 June 1951. Its personnel and equipment were merged with those of VX-4(2nd) to establish on 30 April 1994 a new squadron designated VX-9 which is still active today. The squadron was formally disestablished on 30 September 1994.

| Designation | Insignia | Nickname | Aircraft | Lineage | Notes | Disestablished |
|---|---|---|---|---|---|---|
| VX-5 | | Vampires | AD/A-1, A2J, FJ-4, A4D/A-4, F4H/F-4, A-6, A-7, AH-1, C-1, S-2, EA-6B, F-18, AV-8B | VX-5: 18 Jun 1951-30 Sep 1994 | Established at Naval Air Station Moffett Field to develop day and night tactics for delivery of conventional and special weapons from carrier based aircraft. | 30 September 1994 |

=== (VX)(VXE)(VXN) Antarctic and Oceanographic Development Squadrons ===
On 1 January 1969 two VX squadrons which had been established to support scientific research were redesignated with the descriptive designations of "Antarctic Development" (VXE) squadron and "Oceanographic Development" (VXN) squadron.

- VX-6/VXE-6: Established 17 January 1955, deactivated 27 March 1999.

Established as VX-6 to support Operation Deep Freeze in the Antarctic. Redesignated VXE-6 on 1 January 1969.

| Designation | Insignia | Nickname | Aircraft | Lineage | Notes | Deactivated |
|---|---|---|---|---|---|---|
| VX-6 | | Puckered Penguins | P2V, R7D, LC-117, LC-130, HO4S, HUS-1L/LH-34D | VX-6: 17 Jan 1955-1 Jan 1969 | Supported Antarctic scientific research | |
| VXE-6 | | Puckered Penguins | LC-130, UH-1 | VXE-6: 1 Jan 1969-27 Mar 1999 | Supported Antarctic scientific research | 27 March 1999 (Note: the Antarctic scientific support mission was assumed by the New York National Guard's 109th Airlift Wing) |

- VX-8/VXN-8: Established 1 July 1967, disestablished in 1993.

Established as VX-8 from the Oceanographic Air Survey Unit whose function was to support the Naval Oceanographic Office and redesignated "Oceanographic Development" (VXN) squadron 8 on 1 January 1969.

| Designation | Insignia | Nickname | Aircraft | Lineage | Notes | Disestablished |
|---|---|---|---|---|---|---|
| VX-8 | | Blue Eagles | NC-121J, NC-121K | Oceanographic Air Survey Unit: 1 Jul 1965-1 Jul 1967; VX-8: 1 Jul 1967-1 Jan 1969 | Project Magnet & oceanographic research with Outpost Seascan and Project Birdseye. (Note: Project Birdseye was a U.S. Naval Oceanographic Office and Naval Research Laboratory sea ice observation program. Outpost Seascan was originally Project ASWEPS, a worldwide air observation of oceanographic conditions supporting Antisubmarine Warfare Environmental Prediction Services) Also operated psychological operations radio and TV broadcast aircraft (Blue Eagle aircraft) during the Vietnam War. | |
| VXN-8 | | World Travelers | NC-121J, NC-121K, RP-3D | VXN-8: 1 Jan 1969–1993 | Project Magnet & oceanographic research with Outpost Seascan and Project Birdseye. Also operated psychological operations radio and TV broadcast aircraft (Blue Eagle aircraft) during the Vietnam War. | 1993 (Note: Upon disestablishment the squadrons aircraft were transferred to the Naval Research Laboratory Flight Detachment. In 2004 the Naval Research Laboratory Flight Detachment was established as "Scientific Development" (VXS) squadron ONE (VXS-1) which is a current U S Navy squadron) |

== Training and Utility Squadrons ==
=== (VT) Training Squadrons ===
The VT designation was variously used from 1920 to designate squadrons armed with torpedoes until 1946 when all remaining VT squadrons were redesignated Attack (VA) squadrons. On 1 May 1960 the VT designation was resurrected and existing flying training units were designated "Training Squadrons (VT)". From 1947 to 1960 training units were not designated as squadrons, they were "units" or "groups" called Basic Training Groups (BTG), Advanced Training Units (ATU), Jet Transition Training Units (JTTU) or Multi Engine Training Groups (METG).

| Designation | Insignia | Nickname | Aircraft | Lineage | Notes |
|---|---|---|---|---|---|
| Transition Training Squadron Atlantic | | | | | |
| VT-1 | | Eaglets | T-34 | BTG-1: ??-1 May 1960; VT-1: 1 May 1960–1 Oct 1976 | Training Air Wing SEVEN, NAS Saufley Field. Primary training squadron disestablished with the disestablishment of Training Air Wing SEVEN |
| VT-5 | | Tigers | T-28; T-34 1974 | BTG-5: ??-1 May 1960; VT-5: 1 May 1960–1 Oct 1976 | Training Air Wing SEVEN, NAS Saufley Field. Carrier Qualification training squadron until 1974, then a primary training squadron disestablished with the disestablishment of Training Air Wing SEVEN |
| VT-9 (1st Training Squadron use) | | Tigers | T2J-1/T-2 | VT-9(1st): 15 Dec 1961-Jul 1987 | Training Air Wing ONE, NAS Meridian. Jet training squadron disestablished when Training Air Wing ONE was reduced from three squadrons to two |
| VT-19 | | Fighting Frogs | T-2C | VT-19: 2 Aug 1971–1 Oct 1998; VT-9(2nd): 1 Oct 1998–present. | Training Air Wing ONE, NAS Meridian. Jet training squadron redesignated VT-9 the year following the first VT-9's disestablishment |
| VT-23 | | Professionals | F11F-1/F-11A 1958; TF-9J 1965; TA-4J 1970; T-2C 1972; T-45C 1997 | ATU-222: 11 Nov 1958-1 May 1960; VT-23: 1 May 1960–present (Inactive 30 Sep 1999–present) | Training Air Wing TWO, NAS Kingsville. Reassigned to Training Air Wing ONE, NAS Meridian in 1994. Jet training squadron deactivated when Training Air Wing ONE was reduced from three squadrons to two a second time |
| VT-24 | | Bobcats | F9F-8T/TF-9J 1954; TA-4J 1972 | ATU-203: 1 Jul 1954-1 May 1960; VT-24: 1 May 1960–18 Sep 1992 | Training Air Wing THREE, NAS Chase Field. Jet training squadron disestablished with the disestablishment of Training Air Wing THREE |
| VT-25 | | Cougars | F9F-8T/TF-9J 1954; TA-4J 1972 | ATU-204: 1 Jul 1954–1955; ATU-213: 1955-1 May 1960; VT-25: 1 May 1960-18 Sep 1992 | Training Air Wing THREE, NAS Chase Field. Jet training squadron disestablished with the disestablishment of Training Air Wing THREE |
| VT-26 | | Tigers | F11F-1/F-11A 1960; TF-9J 1967; T-2C 1971 | ATU-223: 1 Mar 1960-1 May 1960; VT-26: 1 May 1960 – 22 May 1992 | Training Air Wing THREE, NAS Chase Field. Jet training squadron disestablished with the disestablishment of Training Air Wing THREE |
| VT-29 | | | R4D-8T/TC-117D; T-29 | ATU-501: ??-1 May 1960; VT-29: 1 May 1960-31 Dec 1976 | NAS Corpus Christi. Land Based multi-engine aircraft navigator training squadron |
| VT-30 | | | AD/A-1H; T-28 | ATU-5: Oct 1952-1955; ATU-301: 1955-1 May 1960; VT-30: 1 May 1960 – 1966 | NAS Corpus Christi. |

=== (VJ)(VU) Utility Squadrons and (VC) Fleet Composite Squadrons ===
From 1925 to 1946 utility squadrons were designated VJ. On 15 November 1946 the designation was changed from VJ to VU. The VJ designation then reappeared from 1952 to 1956 to designate weather squadrons and some photographic squadrons. On 1 July 1965 utility squadrons were renamed and redesignated Fleet Composite (VC) squadrons.

The VC designation was first used from 1943 to 1945 to designate Composite (VC) squadrons. These VC squadrons were composed of fighters, dive bombers and/or torpedo bombers and flew from the decks of small Escort Carriers during WWII. From 1948 to 1956 the VC designation was again used to designated Composite (VC) squadrons but these VC squadrons were squadrons of specialized aircraft which were eventually redesignated Antisubmarine (VS) squadrons, All Weather or Night Fighter (VF(AW)) squadrons, All Weather or Night Attack (VA(AW)) squadrons, Heavy Attack (VAH) squadrons, Carrier Airborne Early Warning (VAW) squadrons or Photographic Reconnaissance (VFP)(VCP) squadrons. There is no relationship between these earlier VC squadrons and the Fleet Composite (VC) squadrons in the table below which had all been established and operated as utility squadrons.

This third and last use of the VC designation appeared on 1 July 1965 as a new name and designation for utility squadrons. These VC squadrons usually operated more than one type of aircraft in a variety of roles such as aerial target support, missile range support, fleet training or fighter squadron training. All but two of these squadrons were ultimately disestablished as the Navy transitioned the utility function to contracted services.

In addition to disestablished or deactivated squadrons, the table below lists the former no longer used VC designations of two squadrons which are still active under a new designation.

- VU-1(2nd)/VC-1(2nd): Established 20 July 1955, disestablished 30 September 1992.

| Designation | Insignia | Nickname | Aircraft | Lineage | Notes | Disestablished |
|---|---|---|---|---|---|---|
| VU-1 (second use) | | Blue Alli | | VU-1(2nd): 20 Jul 1955-1 Jul 1965 | NAS Barbers Point, provided adversary servies for fleet and air combat maneuvering training. Also provided aerial target, aerial photographic, target drone and range services | |
| VC-1 (second use) (Note: the first VC-1 was a WWII squadron of escort carrier based fighters, dive bombers and/or torpedo bombers) | | Blue Alli | F-8, RC-45J, VC-118, DP-2E, US-2C, A-4, UH-34J, SH-3A, G, CH-53E, Target Drones | VC-1(2nd): 1 Jul 1965-30 Sep 1992 | NAS Barbers Point, provided adversary servies for fleet and air combat maneuvering training. Also provided aerial target, aerial photographic, target drone and range services | 30 September 1992 |

- VU-2/VC-2(2nd): Established 8 January 1952, disestablished 30 September 1980.

| Designation | Insignia | Nickname | Aircraft | Lineage | Notes | Disestablished |
|---|---|---|---|---|---|---|
| VU-2 | | Blue Falcons | | VU-2: 8 Jan 1952-1 Jul 1965 | NAS Oceana, provided adversary services for fleet and air combat maneuvering training | |
| VC-2 (second use) (Note: the first VC-2 was a WWII squadron of escort carrier based fighters, dive bombers and/or torpedo bombers) | | Blue Falcons | F-8, US-2C, A-4 | VC-2(2nd): 1 Jul 1965-30 Sep 1980 | NAS Oceana, provided adversary services for fleet and air combat maneuvering training | 30 September 1980 |

- VU-3(2nd)/VC-3(3rd): Established December 1948, disestablished 1 October 1981.

| Designation | Insignia | Nickname | Aircraft | Lineage | Notes | Disestablished |
|---|---|---|---|---|---|---|
| VU-3 (second use) | | Iron Man | | VU-3(2nd): Dec 1948-1 Jul 1965 | NAS North Island, provided target drone services | |
| VC-3 (third use) (Note: the first VC-3 was a WWII squadron of escort carrier based fighters, dive bombers and/or torpedo bombers; the second was an all weather/night fighter squadron which provided detachments to carrier air groups from 1949 to 1954) | | Iron Man | DP-2E, US-2, DC-130, BQM-34, BQM-74, Other Target Drones | VC-3(3rd): 1 Jul 1965-1 Oct 1981 | NAS North Island, provided target drone services | 1 October 1981 |

- VJ-4/VU-4/VC-4(3rd): Established 15 November 1940, disestablished 30 April 1971.

| Designation | Insignia | Nickname | Aircraft | Lineage | Notes | Disestablished |
|---|---|---|---|---|---|---|
| VJ-4 | | Dragon Layers | | VJ-4: 15 Nov 1940-15 Nov 1946 | NAS Jacksonville | |
| VU-4 | | Dragon Layers | | VU-4: 15 Nov 1946-1 Jul 1965 | NAS Jacksonville | |
| VC-4 (third use) (Note: the first VC-4 was a WWII squadron of escort carrier based fighters, dive bombers and/or torpedo bombers; the second was an all weather/night fighter squadron which provided detachments to carrier air groups from 1948 to 1956) | | Dragon Layers | F-8 | VC-4(3rd): 1 Jul 1965-30 Apr 1971 | NAS Jacksonville | 30 April 1971 |

- VU-5*2nd)/VC-5(3rd): Established 16 August 1950, disestablished 31 August 1992.

| Designation | Insignia | Nickname | Aircraft | Lineage | Notes | Disestablished |
|---|---|---|---|---|---|---|
| VU-5 (second use) | | Checkertails | | VU-5(2nd): 16 Aug 1950-1 Jul 1965 | NAS Cubi Point | |
| VC-5 (third use) (Note: the first VC-5 was a WWII squadron of escort carrier based fighters, dive bombers and/or torpedo bombers; the second was a squadron of carrier based nuclear bombers from 1948 to 1955 which became Heavy Attack (VAH) squadron FIVE) | | Checkertails | A-4E, TA-4J, SH-3G, CH-53E | VC-5(3rd): 1 Jul 1965-31 Aug 1992 | NAS Cubi Point | 31 August 1992 |

- VU-6(2nd)/VC-6(3rd): Established 1 March 1952, deactivated 30 June 2008.

| Designation | Insignia | Nickname | Aircraft | Lineage | Notes | Deactivated |
|---|---|---|---|---|---|---|
| VU-6 (second use) | | Skeeters | surface and air target drones | VU-6(2nd): 1 Mar 1952-1 Jul 1965 | NAS Norfolk, operated target drones (surface and air) | |
| VC-6 (third use) (Note: the first VC-6 was a WWII squadron of escort carrier based fighters, dive bombers and/or torpedo bombers; the second was a squadron of carrier based nuclear bombers from 1950 to 1956 which became Heavy Attack (VAH) squadron SIX) | | Skeeters; Firebees | RQ-2A, BQM-74, Other surface and air target drones | VC-6(3rd): 1 Jul 1965-30 Jun 2008 | NAS Norfolk, operated target drones (surface and air) and later operated the Pioneer UAV; Originally nicknamed "Skeeters" but later adopted "Firebees" to honor VC-6(2nd) Firebees which flew the AJ Savage "Heavy Attack" nuclear bomber | 30 June 2008 |

- VJ-1/VU-7/VC-7(3rd): Established 4 December 1942, disestablished 30 September 1980.

| Designation | Insignia | Nickname | Aircraft | Lineage | Notes | Disestablished |
|---|---|---|---|---|---|---|
| VJ-1 | | Redtails | | VJ-1: 4 Dec 1942-15 Nov 1946 | NAS Miramar, towed targets and provided adversary services for fleet and air combat maneuvering training | |
| VU-7 | | Redtails | | VU-7: 15 Nov 1946-1 Jul 1965 | NAS Miramar, towed targets and provided adversary services for fleet and air combat maneuvering training | |
| VC-7 (third use) (Note: the first VC-7 was a WWII squadron of escort carrier based fighters, dive bombers and/or torpedo bombers; the second was a squadron of carrier based nuclear bombers from 1950 to 1955 which became Heavy Attack (VAH) squadron SEVEN) | | Redtails | A-4, F-8, F-4 | VC-7(3rd): 1 Jul 1965-30 Sep 1980 | NAS Miramar, towed targets and provided adversary services for fleet and air combat maneuvering training | 30 September 1980 |

- GMSR-2/VU-8/VC-8(3rd): Established 1 July 1958, deactivated 1 October 2003.

| Designation | Insignia | Nickname | Aircraft | Lineage | Notes | Deactivated |
|---|---|---|---|---|---|---|
| GMSR-2 (Note: Guided Missile Service squadron) | | | | GMSR-2: 1 Jul 1958-1 Jul 1960 | NS Roosevelt Roads | |
| VU-8 | | Redtails | | VU-8: 1 Jul 1960-1 Jul 1965 | NS Roosevelt Roads | |
| VC-8 (third use) (Note: the first VC-8 was a WWII squadron of escort carrier based fighters, dive bombers and/or torpedo bombers; the second was a squadron of carrier based nuclear bombers from 1951 to 1955 which became Heavy Attack (VAH) squadron ELEVEN) | | Redtails | A-4, SH-3G | VC-8(3rd): 1 Jul 1965-1 Oct 2003 | NS Roosevelt Roads | 1 October 2003 |

- VJ-16/VU-10/VC-10(2nd): Established 1 December 1943, disestablished 14 August 1993.

| Designation | Insignia | Nickname | Aircraft | Lineage | Notes | Disestablished |
|---|---|---|---|---|---|---|
| VJ-16 | | Challengers | | VJ-16: 1 Dec 1943-15 Nov 1946 | NAS Leeward Point Guantanamo Bay | |
| VU-10 | | Challengers | | VU-10: 15 Nov 1946-1 Jul 1965 | NAS Leeward Point Guantanamo Bay | |
| VC-10 (second use) (Note: the first VC-10 was a WWII squadron of escort carrier based fighters, dive bombers and/or torpedo bombers) | | Challengers | US-2C, F-8, TA-4J, EA-4F | VC-10(2nd): 1 Jul 1965-14 Aug 1993 | NAS Leeward Point Guantanamo Bay, provided adversary and aerial target services for Atlantic Fleet carrier battle group deployment work-ups. Also tasked with defense of the Guantanamo base. | 14 August 1993 |

- VC-12(3rd)/VFC-12: Established 1 September 1973, still active as VFC-12.

| Designation | Insignia | Nickname | Aircraft | Lineage | Notes | Current Designation |
|---|---|---|---|---|---|---|
| VC-12 (third use) (Note: the first VC-12 was a WWII squadron of escort carrier based fighters, dive bombers and/or torpedo bombers; the second was a squadron which provided detachments of airborne early warning aircraft to carrier air groups from 1948 to 1956 and became Carrier Airborne Early Warning (VAW) squadron TWELVE) | | Fighting Omars | A-4; TA-4 | VC-12(3rd): 1 Sep 1973-22 Apr 1988; VFC-12: 22 Apr 1988–present | U.S. Navy Reserve Squadron, NAF Detroit, moved to NAS Oceana, provided aggressor services for air to air combat training | VFC-12 |

- VC-13(2nd)/VFC-13: Established 1 September 1973, still active as VFC-13.

| Designation | Insignia | Nickname | Aircraft | Lineage | Notes | Current Designation |
|---|---|---|---|---|---|---|
| VC-13 (second use) (Note: the first VC-13 was a WWII squadron of escort carrier based fighters, dive bombers and/or torpedo bombers) | | Saints | A-4; TA-4 | VC-13(2nd): 1 Sep 1973-22 Apr 1988; VFC-13: 22 Apr 1988–present | U.S. Navy Reserve Squadron, NAS New Orleans, moved to NAS Miramar, provided aggressor services for air to air combat training | VFC-13 |

== Lighter Than Air Squadrons ==
In 1920 General Order 541 was issued identifying two overall types of aircraft and assigning them permanent letters; lighter than air types were identified by the letter Z and heavier than air types by the letter V. The use of letter abbreviations for squadrons was promulgated in the "Naval Aeronautic Organization for Fiscal Year 1923" which is the first known record associating the abbreviated Aircraft Class Designations (V-heavier than air, Z-lighter than air, and letters designating role) with abbreviated squadron designations. The Navy's last lighter than air squadrons were disestablished in 1961 thus ending the use of the lighter than air "Z" designation.

=== (ZJ) Blimp Utility Squadrons ===
The ZJ designation was a short lived designation in use only from 1944 to 1945 to designated a single squadron.

| Designation | Insignia | Nickname | Aircraft | Lineage | Notes | Disestablished |
|---|---|---|---|---|---|---|
| ZJ-1 | | | | ZJ-1: 1 Feb 1944-9 Jun 1945 | Torpedo recovery, photographic and calibration services and other general utility functions. (Note: It had been formed to relieve the operational ZP squadrons of these duties, so that they could concentrate on their ASW mission) Also administered Airship Antisubmarine Training Detachment, Atlantic Fleet. Based at NAS Lakehurst | 9 June 1945 |

=== (ZK) Kite Balloon Squadrons ===
The ZK designation was the first lighter than air squadron designation. It was in use from 1922 to 1924.

=== (ZP) Airship Patrol/Blimp/Airship Patrol (All Weather Anti-Submarine)/Airship/LTA Patrol Squadrons ===
The ZP designation was in use from 1942 to 1961 and designated variously through the period "Airship Patrol Squadron", "Blimp Squadron", "Airship Patrol Squadron (All Weather Anti-Submarine)", "Airship Squadron" or "Lighter Than Air (LTA) Patrol Squadron".

| Squadron Name | Insignia | Nickname | Aircraft | Date disestablished | Based in |
|---|---|---|---|---|---|
| ZP-12 | | | | 1947 | NAS Lakehurst, NJ |
| ZP-15 | | | | 1947 | NAS Glynco, Georgia |
| ZP-14 | | | | 1947 | NAS Lakehurst, NJ |
| ZP-15 | | | | 1947 | NAS Weeksville, NC |
| ZP-11 | | | | 1947 | NAS South Weymouth, MA |
| ZP-21 | | | | 1947 | NAS Richmond, FL |
| ZP-22 | | | | 1947 | NAS Houma, LA |
| ZP-23 | | | | 1947 | NAS Hitchcock, TX |
| ZP-32 | | | | 1947 | NAS Moffett Field, CA |
| ZP-31 | | | | 1947 | NAS Santa Ana, CA |
| ZP-33 | | | | 1947 | NAS Tillamook, OR |
| ZP-41 | | | | 1947 | Sao Luiz, Brazil |
| ZP-42 | | | | 1947 | Maceió, Brazil |
| ZP-51 | | | | 1947 | Trinidad |

=== (ZW) Airship Early Warning Squadrons ===
The ZW designation was in use from 1956 to 1961 to designate squadrons operating blimps equipped with early warning radar used to fill radar gaps in the North American early-warning network between the Contiguous Barrier and the Inshore Barrier during the Cold War.

=== (ZX) Airship Operational Development or Airship Development Squadrons ===
The ZX designation was in use from 1950 to 1957.

== See also ==
- List of United States Navy aircraft designations (pre-1962) / List of US Naval aircraft
- List of United States Navy aircraft squadrons
- List of United States Navy aircraft wings
- Military aviation
- Modern US Navy carrier air operations
- Naval aviation
- Naval Flight Officer
- United States Marine Corps Aviation
- United States Naval Aviator
- Naval aircrewman
- VBF

== References and notes ==
Notes

Bibliography

- Grossnick, Roy A. (1995). Dictionary of American Naval Aviation Squadrons Volume 1 - The History of VA, VAH, VAK, VAL, VAP and VFA Squadrons. Naval Historic Center, Department of the Navy. ISBN 0-945274-29-7. Archived from the original on 3 July 1998.
- Roberts, Michael D. (2000). Dictionary of American Naval Aviation Squadrons Volume 2 T- The History of VP, VPB, VP(HL) and VP(AM) Squadrons. Naval Historic Center, Department of the Navy. Archived from the original on 15 September 2008.
- OPNAVINST 5030.4G – Navy Aviation Squadron Lineage and Naval Aviation Command Insignia (2012)
- "APPENDIX 6 Lineage Listing for VA, VA(AW), VAH, VA(HM), VAK, VAL, VAP, and VFA Designated Squadrons" (PDF). Dictionary of American Naval Aviation Squadrons Volume 1. pp. 543–550. Archived from the original (PDF) on 20 September 2000.
