= Tactical Support Wing =

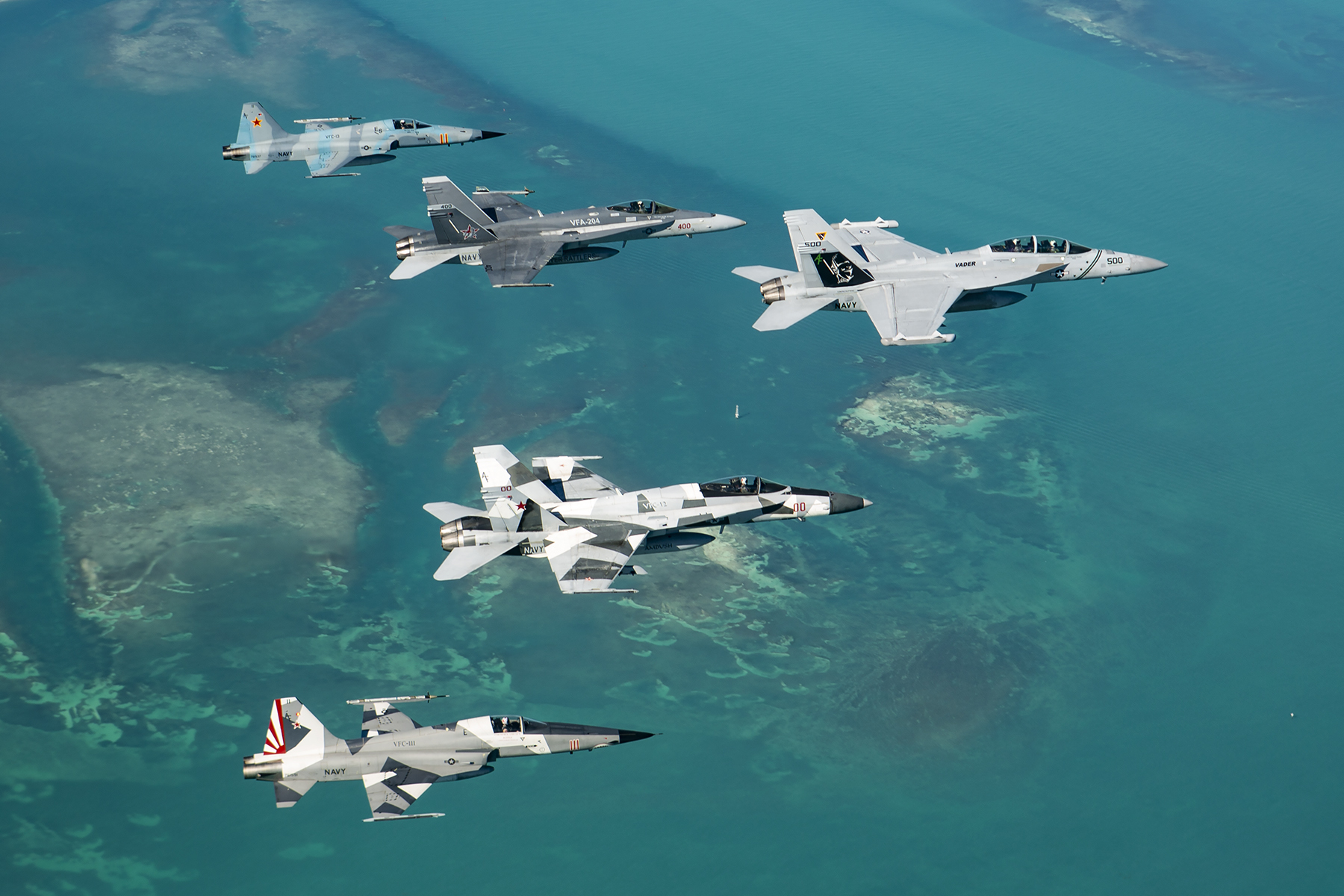
- Tactical Support Wing aircraft in flight, 2021
- Active: 1 April 1970 – present (56 years, 1 month)
- Country: United States
- Branch: United States Navy
- Role: Adversary training Electronic warfare
- Part of: United States Navy Reserve: Naval Air Force Reserve
- Garrison/HQ: NAS JRB Fort Worth, Texas
- Engagements: Operation Deny Flight

Insignia
- Tactical Support Wing emblem

The Tactical Support Wing (TSW) is one of three reserve aircraft wings of the United States Navy. The wing reports to the Commander, Naval Air Force Reserve. It is headquartered at Naval Air Station Joint Reserve Base Fort Worth, Texas along with the reserve's Fleet Logistics Support Wing (FLSW). The third reserve wing is the Maritime Support Wing (MSW) which is headquartered at Naval Air Station North Island, California. The wing's primary mission is operational and training support for active forces. It is composed of five squadrons.

The wing was established on 1 April 1970 as Reserve Carrier Air Wing 20 (CVWR-20). It was later redesignated to its current name on 1 April 2007.

It is the Navy Reserve's only tactical wing since the 1994 disestablishment Reserve Carrier Air Wing 30 (CVWR-30).

== Subordinate units ==
=== Current squadrons ===
The Tactical Support Wing consists of five squadrons as of May 2021:

- VFC-12 Fighting Omars – based at NAS Oceana, Virginia, operating the F/A-18E/F Super Hornet
- VFC-13 Saints – based at NAS Fallon, Nevada, operating the F-16C Fighting Falcon
- VFC-111 Sundowners – based at NAS Key West, Florida, operating the F-5 Tiger II
- VFC-204 River Rattlers – based at NAS JRB New Orleans, Louisiana, operating the F-5 Tiger II (was formerly designated VA-204 and VFA-204)
- VAQ-209 Star Warriors – based at NAS Whidbey Island, Washington, operating the EA-18G Growler

=== Former squadrons ===
Dates of assignment to the wing are shown in parentheses

- HS-75 Emerald Knights
  - (transferred from CVSGR-70 June 1976 to Helicopter Wing Reserve
    and marked as CVWR-20 mobilization squadron until April 2007)
- VAW-77 Nightwolves
  - (November 1995 to March 2013)
- VAW-78 Fighting Escargots
  - (transferred from CVSGR-70 September 1975 to March 2005)
- VFA-201 Hunters
  - (July 1970 to March 2007, was originally designated VF-201)
- VF-202 Superheats
  - (July 1970 to December 1994)
- VFA-203 Blue Dolphins
  - (July 1970 to June 2004, was originally designated VA-203)
- VA-205 Green Falcons
  - (July 1970 to December 1994)
- VFP-206 Peeping Toms
  - (June 1970 to March 1987)
- VAW-207
  - (July 1970 to September 1974)
- VAK-208 Jockeys
  - (July 1970 to September 1989, was originally designated VAQ-208)
- VA-209
  - (July 1970 to August 1971)
- VA-210 Black Hawks
  - (July 1970 to June 1971)

== History ==
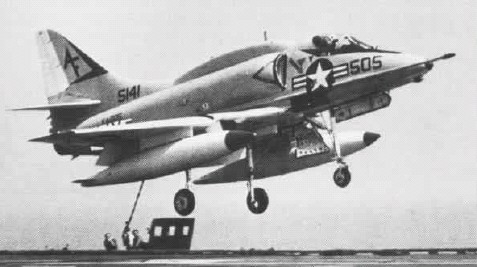
An A-4 of VA-205 lands on USS Saratoga, June 1975

The wing was established on 1 April 1970 as Reserve Carrier Air Wing 20 (CVWR-20) along with fellow reserve wings Reserve Carrier Air Wing 30 (CVWR-30) also on 1 April 1970 and Reserve Antisubmarine Carrier Air Group 70 (CVSGR-70) and Reserve Antisubmarine Carrier Air Group 80 (CVSGR-80) both on 1 May 1970. CVWR-20 and CVSG-70 were aligned with the U.S. Atlantic Fleet and CVWR-30 and CVSGR-80 with the U.S. Pacific Fleet. All four wings were established as part of a plan to create a mirror image of the active duty units, after previous years saw the reserve units fly outdated aircraft that also had to be shared with the Marine Corps Reserve. The two CVSGRs were disestablished in June and July of 1976 and CVWR-30 was disestablished on 31 December 1994 leaving CVWR-20 as the only remaining sea going reserve air wing.

CVWR-20 was initially composed of VA-203, VA-204, VA-205, VFP-206, VAW-207, VAQ-208, VA-209, and VA-210. The wing's five VA squadrons were atypical as active component air wings consisted of two VF and three VA squadrons. VA-209 and VA-210 were replaced by VF-201 and VF-202 and were disestablished in 1971. In October 1977 VAQ-209 was established as the wing's Tactical Electronic Warfare squadron. The wing's original VAQ squadron, VAQ-208 though designated VAQ operated KA-3 Skywarrior tankers (not the EKA-3B electronic warfare variant) and in 1979 it was redesignated VAK-208 to reflect that reality. VA-204 (now designated VFC-204) is the only squadron which was established with the wing and remains a part of it today.

In June 1975, the wing deployed aboard USS Saratoga (CV-60), composed of VF-201, VF-202, VA-203, VA-204, VA-205, VPF-206, and VAQ-208. The squadrons conducted carrier qualifications alongside units from CVWR-30.

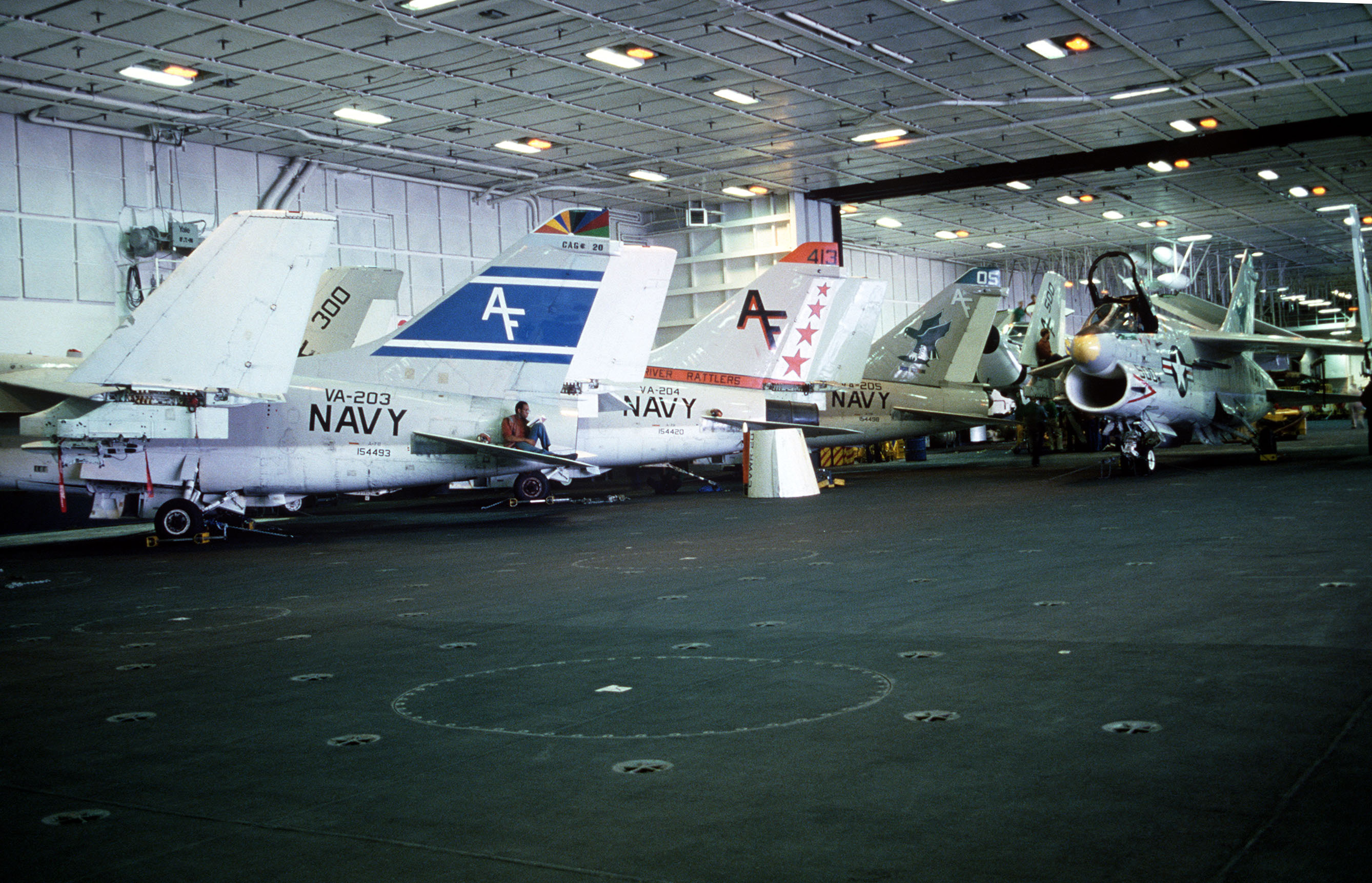
A-7B Corsairs of VA-203, VA-204, and VA-205 aboard USS Carl Vinson, June 1982

In July 1989, CVWR-20 deployed aboard USS Dwight D. Eisenhower (CVN-69) for a 10-day cruise, earning the captain's praise and achieving a 94 percent boarding rate.

On 1 October 1992, CVWR-20 took over control of VFC-12 and VFC-13. Both squadrons were previously assigned to the Fleet Logistics Support Wing. In November 2006 VFC-13's permanent Key West detachment was established as VFC-111 and was added to the wing.

The 1994 disestablishment of CVWR-30 left CVWR-20 as the only reserve air wing capable of deploying to carriers, with a fleet of F/A-18 Hornets, operated by VFC-12 and VFC-13, as well as E-2 Hawkeyes of VAW-77 and VAW-78, making up the wing.

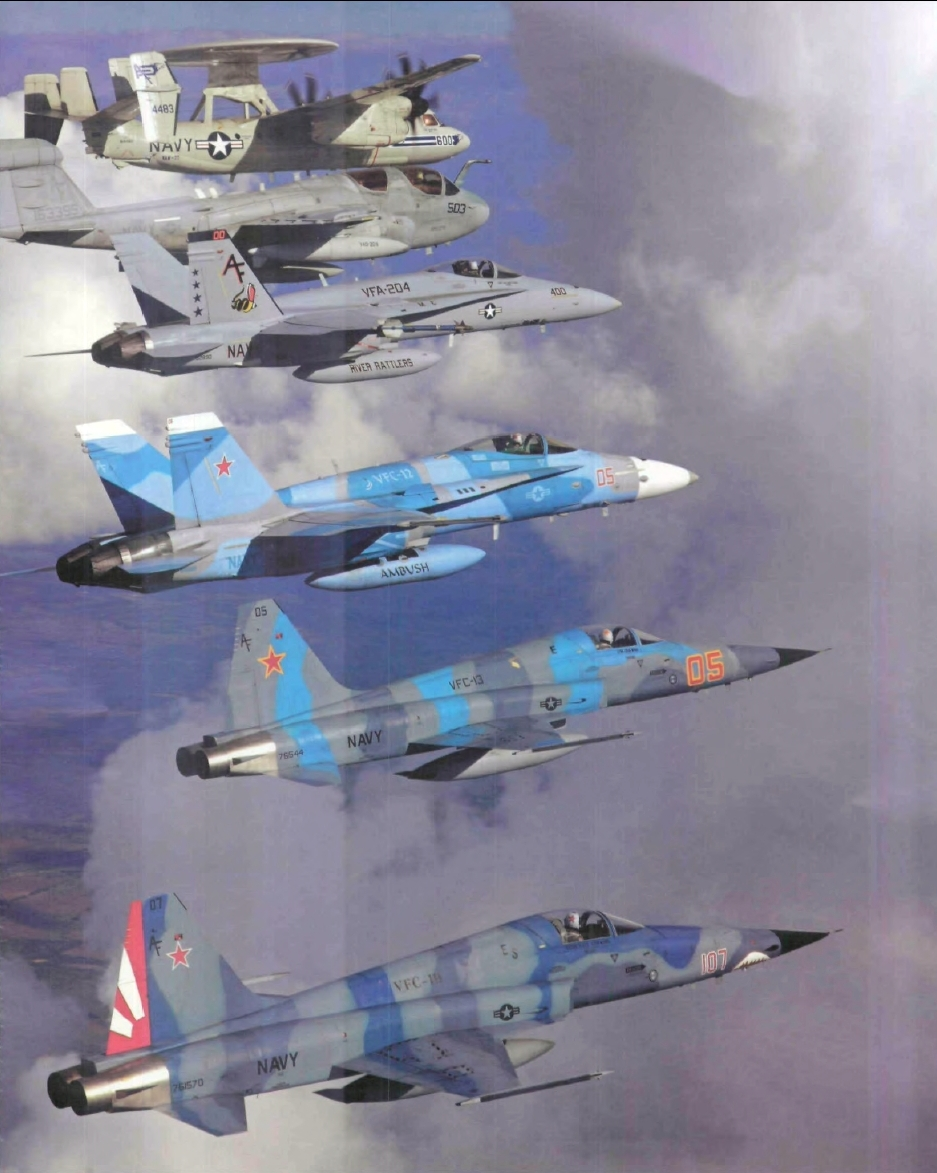
Tactical Support Wing aircraft in flight, 2009

In 2003, members of the wing's VFA-201 deployed as part of Carrier Air Wing 8 aboard USS Theodore Roosevelt (CVN-71).

In 2006, the wing conducted operations in support of Operation Iraqi Freedom, with VAQ-209 deploying to Al Asad Air Base, Iraq, for three months. VAW-77, at the time the Navy's sole expeditionary E-2 squadron, conducted drug interdiction operations in the Caribbean. In addition, the squadron provided command and control for hundreds of aircraft during the search and rescue operation in the aftermath of Hurricane Katrina.

On 1 April 2007 CVWR-20 was redesigned Tactical Support Wing in recognition of the wing's change in function from its original mirror image of an active component carrier air wing able to deploy aboard aircraft carriers to its current function of operational and training support for active forces. At the time of the redesignation the wing consisted of six squadrons: VFA-204 which was the original CVWR-20's VA-204, VAQ-209 which was established into the wing in 1977, VFC-12 and VFC-13 which transferred into the wing in 1992, VFC-111 which was established into the wing from VFC-13 in 2006, and VAW-77 which had been established in 1995 specifically to support the United States Coast Guard and other Federal Agencies in interdicting illegal drug trafficking through the Caribbean Sea and across the southern border. VAW-77 was deactivated in March of 2013 leaving the wing with its current five squadrons. By 2022 VFA-204 was the sole remaining squadron in the Navy flying the F/A-18C Hornet. In October of 2022 it retired the Hornet from Navy service, was redesignated VFC-204 and received VFC-13's F-5 Tiger II aircraft as VFC-13 transitioned from the F-5 to the F-16C Fighting Falcon.

== See also ==
- Carrier air wing
- List of United States Navy aircraft wings
