= VA-210 (U.S. Navy) =

Attack Squadron 210
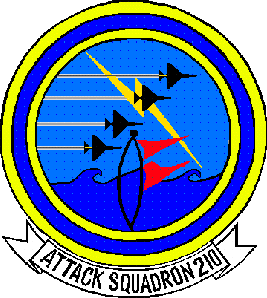
- VA-210 Insignia
- Active: 1 July 1970 – 30 June 1971
- Country: United States
- Branch: United States Navy Reserve
- Type: Attack
- Role: Close air support
- Part of: Inactive
- Nickname(s): Black Hawks

Attack Squadron 210 (VA-210) was an aviation unit of the United States Naval Reserve active between 1970 and 1971. VA-210 aircraft wore CVWR-20's tail code "AF", the squadron's nickname was Black Hawks.

== History ==
The United States Navy reorganized its Naval Air Reserve units in 1970. To bolster their strength two Reserve Carrier Air Wings (CVWR) were formed, CVWR-20 on the U.S. East Coast and CVWR-30 on the U.S. West Coast.

Utilizing assets from reserve squadron VA-2Z1 attack squadron VA-210 was established at the NAS South Weymouth, Massachusetts on 1 July 1970. The unit was commanded by Commander W.M. Hollister and equipped with A-4C Skyhawk attack planes.

However, CVWR-20 had originally only attacked squadrons. The decision was made to replace two of the attack squadrons with fighter squadrons in 1971. VA-210 was one of the squadrons to be replaced by fighter squadrons VF-201 and VF-202. Aircraft of VA-210 made their last operational flight on 14 December 1970, the squadron being disestablished on 30 June 1971.

== See also ==
- List of squadrons in the Dictionary of American Naval Aviation Squadrons
- History of the United States Navy
- List of inactive United States Navy aircraft squadrons
- List of United States Navy aircraft squadrons
