= VAW-77 =

Carrier Airborne Early Warning Squadron 77
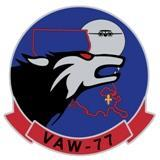
- VAW-77 Insignia
- Active: 17 November 1995 – 9 March 2013
- Country: United States of America
- Branch: United States Navy
- Type: Reconnaissance
- Role: Counter-narcotics Squadron
- Part of: Commander Tactical Support Wing
- Garrison/HQ: Naval Air Station Atlanta (formerly); Naval Air Station Joint Reserve Base New Orleans
- Nickname: "Nightwolves"
- Engagements: War on drugs

Aircraft flown
- Electronic warfare: E-2C Hawkeye

Carrier Airborne Early Warning Squadron 77 (VAW-77) "Nightwolves" was an aviation unit of the United States Navy Reserve based at Naval Air Station Atlanta from 1995 to 2008, then at Naval Air Station Joint Reserve Base New Orleans from 2008 to 2013 and was routinely deployed to the United States and the Caribbean, comprising the U.S. Navy's only fully dedicated counter-narcotics squadron.

The squadron was under Carrier Air Wing Reserve 20 also known as the Tactical Support Wing, before VAW-77 was deactivated on 31 March 2013.

== Squadron history ==
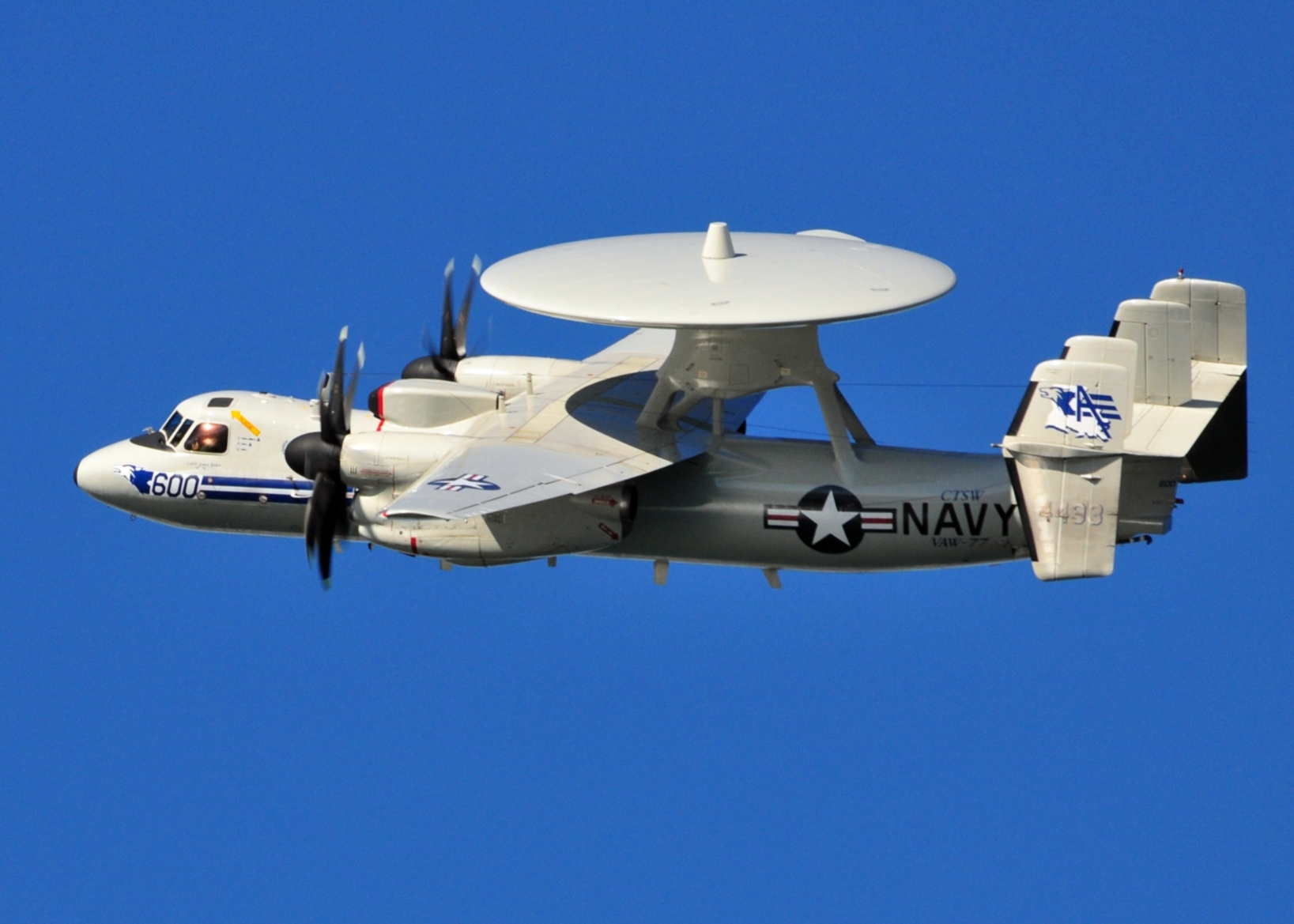
A U.S. Navy Reserve E-2C Hawkeye from VAW-77 Night Wolves flies over San Diego Bay during the Centennial of Naval Aviation Open House and Parade of Flight at NAS North Island.

VAW-77 was created on 1 October 1995 when the U.S. Congress created the reserve squadron as a result of the United States escalating war on illegal drug trafficking. VAW-77 received four specially modified E-2C Hawkeye airborne early warning aircraft optimized for counter-drug missions. As part of the Navy's post-Cold War role, VAW-77 flight crews patrolled the waters of the Caribbean in joint missions with the United States Coast Guard and other drug enforcement agencies in search of illegal aircraft and ships.

=== 1990s ===
VAW-77 was established on 1 October 1995 to replace VAW-122 as a full-time counter narcotics E-2C squadron.

On 18 October 1995, VAW-77 was commissioned, as a Reserve Squadron serving with the US Coast Guard and other Federal Agencies to fight the war on drugs, providing air surveillance for the United States Southern Command. The squadron worked in tandem with Coast Guard and other federal law enforcement agencies to combine and coordinate operations of counter-narcotics forces. The E-2C Hawkeye squadron deploys four to five times a year to bases near known drug trafficking routes to help identify suspected drug smugglers. The squadron spends approximately four to five months per year forward deployed to bases near illegal drug traffic lanes. 18–19 October 1995 was also the squadrons first drill weekend, On 25 October 1995 VAW-77 initiated their first flight Commander Thomas D. Lindsey, LCDR Bryan Cutchen and CDR Wetzel.

7-9 January 1996, VAW-77 participated in a missile exercise alongside Marine Aircraft Group 49 (MAG-49).

On 11 February 1997, VAW-77 provided SAR alert services for STS-80.

After Hurricane Floyd hit in late 1999, VAW-77 and VAW-78 provided communication, command and control (C3) support to U.S. Coast Guard, Air Force, Army aircraft, and C-130 for humanitarian relief and flood evacuation operations in Virginia, North and South Carolina. When flooding began in Virginia and North Carolina near the Tar River, VAW-77 and VAW-78 initially supported search and rescue operations over the drill weekend.

In 1999, VAW-77 to date flown 6676.5 hours and 1755 sorties in support of counter-drug operations and directly responsible for the seizure of 20.4 metric tons of cocaine and 10.5 metric tons of marijuana en route to the United States.

=== 2000s ===
Since commissioning, the Nightwolves have completed a number of sixty-day counter-drug deployments to the Caribbean Theater. From 2000 to 2001, Rear Admiral Bryan Cutchen commanded VAW-77. VAW-77 would often deploy and perform counter-drug operations out of NS Roosevelt Roads until the Naval Station ceased active operations in October 2003 prior to its inactivation on 31 March 2004. VAW-77 continues to operate out of Howard AFB, Patrick AFB, Comalapa AFB, Coast Guard Air Station Borinquen, Manta Air Force Base, and Hato International Airport. Squadron aircraft have been involved in over 120 high-profile arrests and seizures of drug carrying container ships, high-speed watercraft, and light civilian aircraft.

On 1–2 October 2002. VAW-77 helped support the launch of STS-112 at Patrick AFB, Florida.

Throughout 2002, VAW-77 flew 1,717 mishap free flight hours for 456 sorties. From 1995 to 2002, VAW-77 have flown 9,466.6 hours in 508 sorties and seizied 28 t (62,000 lb) of cocaine and 11.5 t (25,000 lb) of marijuana en route to the United States.

In 2005 the squadron participated in the federal military response to Katrina in 2005.

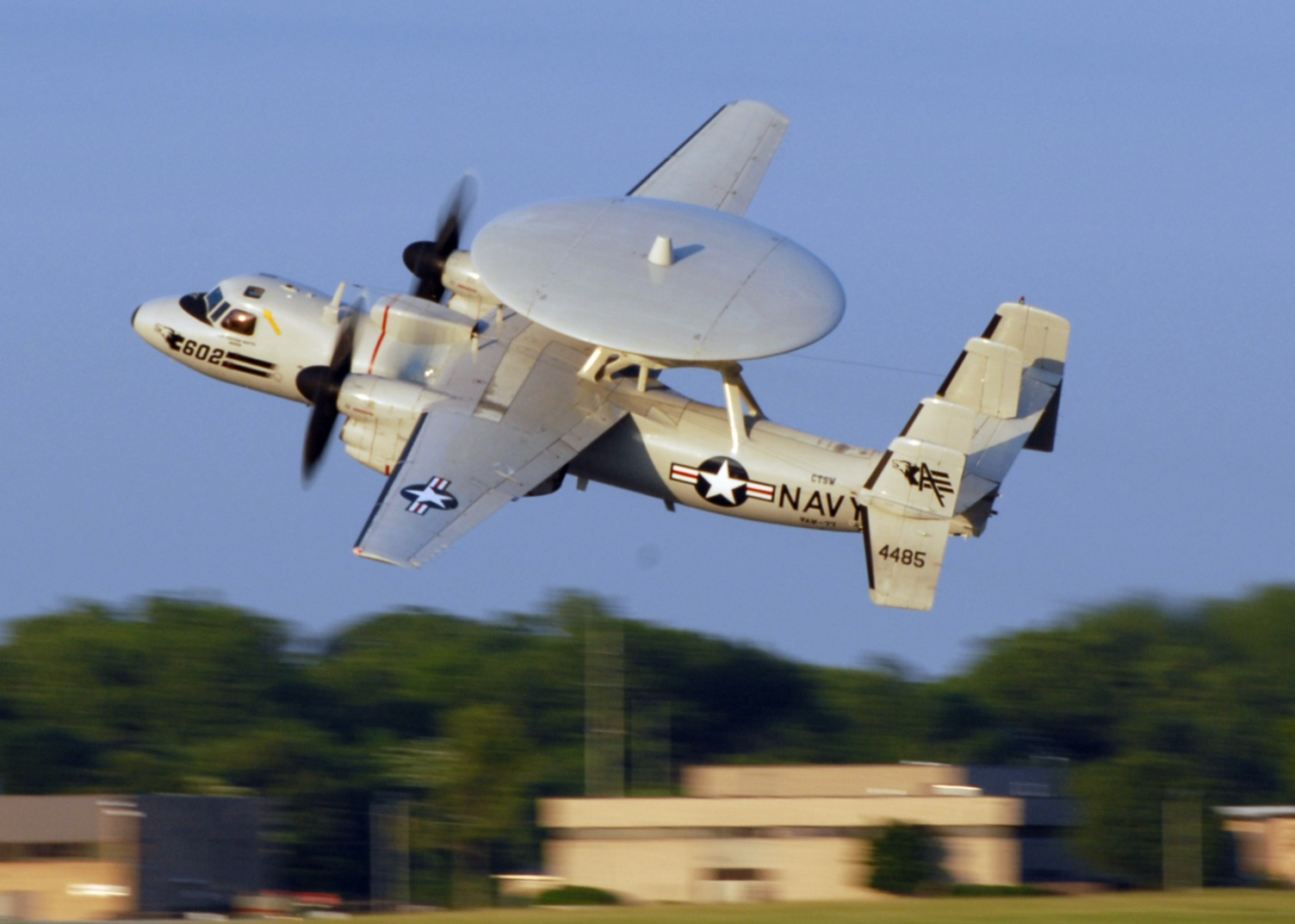
VAW-77 E-2C taking off from Joint Base Andrews, May 2010

In 2008, VAW-77 moved to its new home of NAS JRB New Orleans in response to BRAC's decision to close Naval Air Station Atlanta.

=== 2010s ===
The squadron was the first U.S. Navy fixed-wing squadron to deploy to Colombia in 2011, also in 2012, it had a role in disrupting the flow of $735 million in illegal drugs into the U.S. and the arrest of 17 international smugglers.

Because of spending cuts throughout the Department of Defense, the unit was recommended for deactivation by the Secretary of the Navy. In February 2013, the Nightwolves were formally disbanded, and its crew & equipment were in the process of being redistributed throughout other naval squadrons. VAW-77 was deactivated on 31 March 2013. The squadron's six aircraft were transferred to other carrier airborne warning squadrons and the squadron members were transfer to various other Commander Naval Air Force Reserve (CNAFR) squadrons.

== Unit citations ==
The squadron's other awards include a Joint Meritorious Unit Award for 1997, Navy Meritorious Unit Commendation, Coast Guard Meritorious Unit Commendation for 1996, two Battle "E" awards (one for 1998), the Safety "S" and numerous Bravo Zulu's and unit citations.

== Amount of seized drugs en route to the United States ==
This is a table of how many drugs were stopped by VAW-77 since 1995. Each year is the amount of drugs seized up to date at that point.

Year	Cocaine	Marijuana	Ref
1997-1998	15.4 t (34,000 lb)	7.2 t (16,000 lb)	
1999	20.4 t (45,000 lb)	10.5 t (23,000 lb)	
2000-2001	28 t (62,000 lb)	11.5 t (25,000 lb)	
2002	28 t (62,000 lb)	11.5 t (25,000 lb)	

== See also ==
- History of the United States Navy
- List of United States Navy aircraft squadrons
