= VA210 =

VA-210 may refer to:

- Attack Squadron 210 (U.S. Navy)
- State Route 210 (Virginia)
