= VA-205 (U.S. Navy) =

Attack Squadron 205
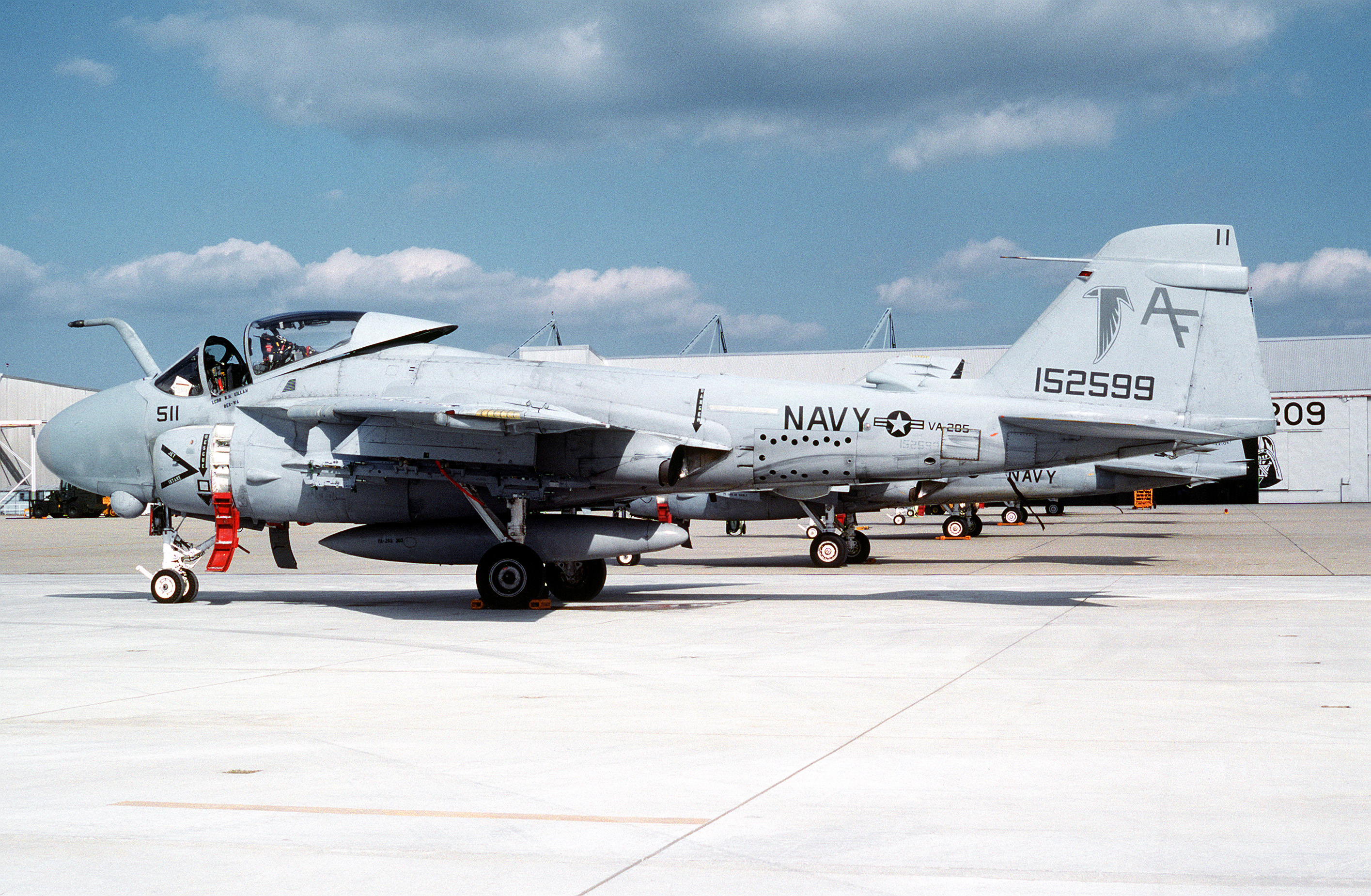
- VA-205 A-6E Intruder at Naval Air Facility Washington D.C., 1993
- Active: 1 July 1970 - 31 December 1994
- Country: United States
- Branch: United States Navy Reserve
- Type: Attack
- Nickname(s): Green Falcons

Aircraft flown
- Attack: A-4 Skyhawk; A-7 Corsair II; A-6E/KA-6D Intruder

VA-205, nicknamed the Green Falcons, was an Attack Squadron of the U.S. Naval Reserve, based at Naval Air Station Atlanta, Georgia. It was established on 1 July 1970 and disestablished on 31 December 1994.

== Operational history ==
- 1 July 1970: VA-205, a reserve squadron, was established as part of a reorganization intended to increase the combat readiness of the Naval Air Reserve Force.
- August 1971: The squadron conducted its two weeks of active duty training embarked on USS John F. Kennedy as part of CVWR-20. This was the first complete reserve carrier air wing deployment aboard a carrier.
- May 1972: The squadron participated in exercise Exotic Dancer V, designed to test multi-service operations under a unified command organization.
- 4 September 1975: Squadron pilots began transition training with VA-125 in preparation for receiving the A-7 Corsair II.
- 6–16 July 1982: The squadron, along with other units of CVWR-20, participated in operations on USS Carl Vinson, with the emphasis on coordinated air wing operations.
- 10–23 May 1986: During an annual active duty deployment to NAS Fallon, the squadron participated in close air support training, air wing strike evolutions, and an excellent simulated two-day war exercise conducted by Strike University.
- 1 Oct 1993: The squadron assumed the additional mission (Fleet Support Readiness Group, FTRG) of providing electronic support to simulate missile attacks on surface ships for training purposes. This mission had previously been performed by VAQ-33 (Carrier Tactical Electronics Warfare Squadron 33).

== Aircraft assignment ==
The squadron first received the following aircraft on the dates shown:

- A-4L Skyhawk – 01 Oct 1970
- A-7B Corsair II – 26 Sep 1975
- A-7E Corsair II – 20 Jun 1984
- KA-6D Intruder – 22 Aug 1990
- A-6E Intruder – 17 Nov 1990

== See also ==
- List of squadrons in the Dictionary of American Naval Aviation Squadrons
- Attack aircraft
- List of inactive United States Navy aircraft squadrons
- History of the United States Navy
