= VAK-208 =

Tactical Aerial Refueling Squadron 208
- Active: 30 July 1970 – 30 September 1989
- Country: United States
- Branch: United States Navy
- Role: Refueling
- Part of: CVWR-20
- Nickname(s): Jockeys

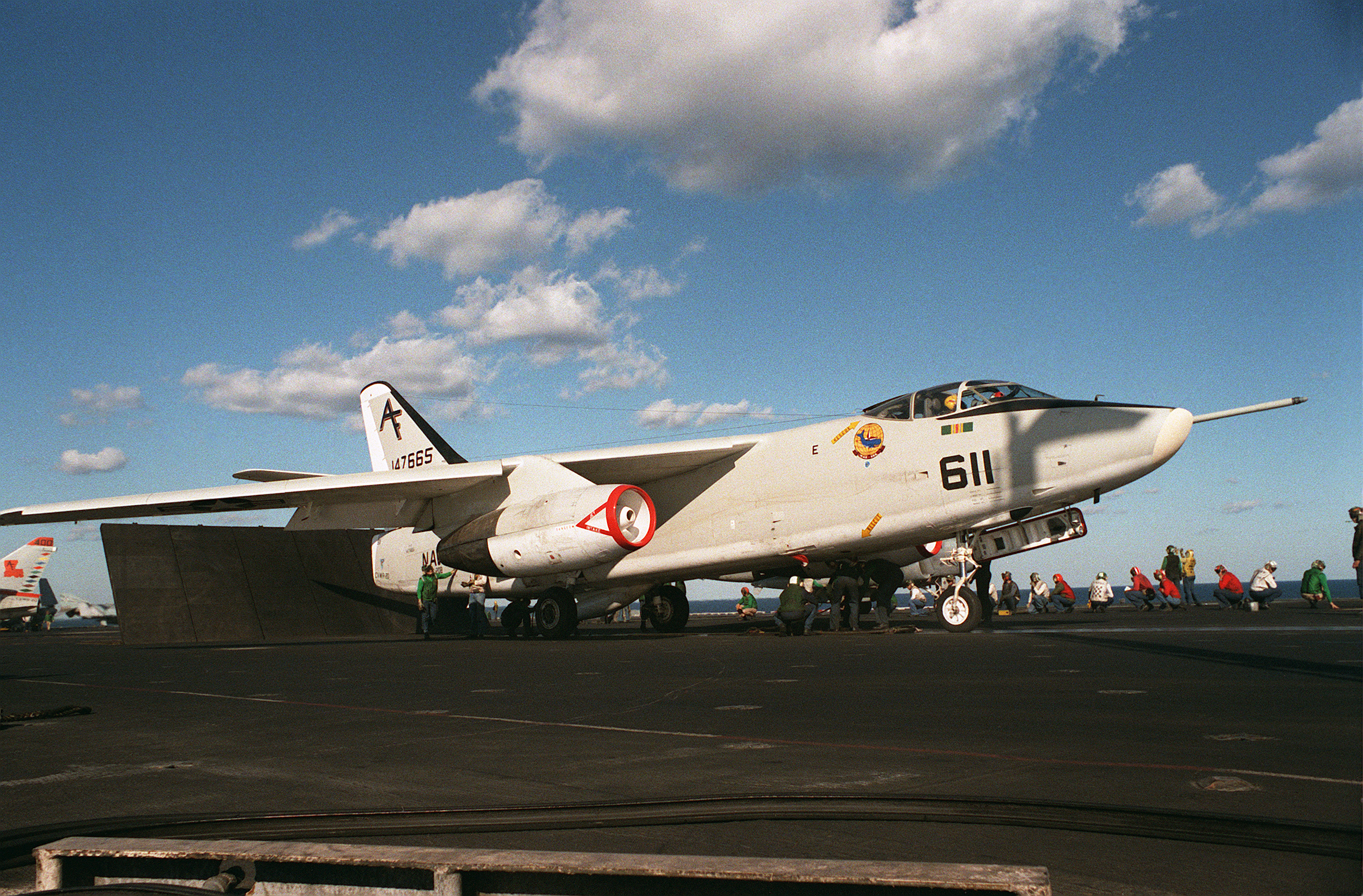
VAK-208 KA-3B prepares to launch from USS Dwight D. Eisenhower in 1985

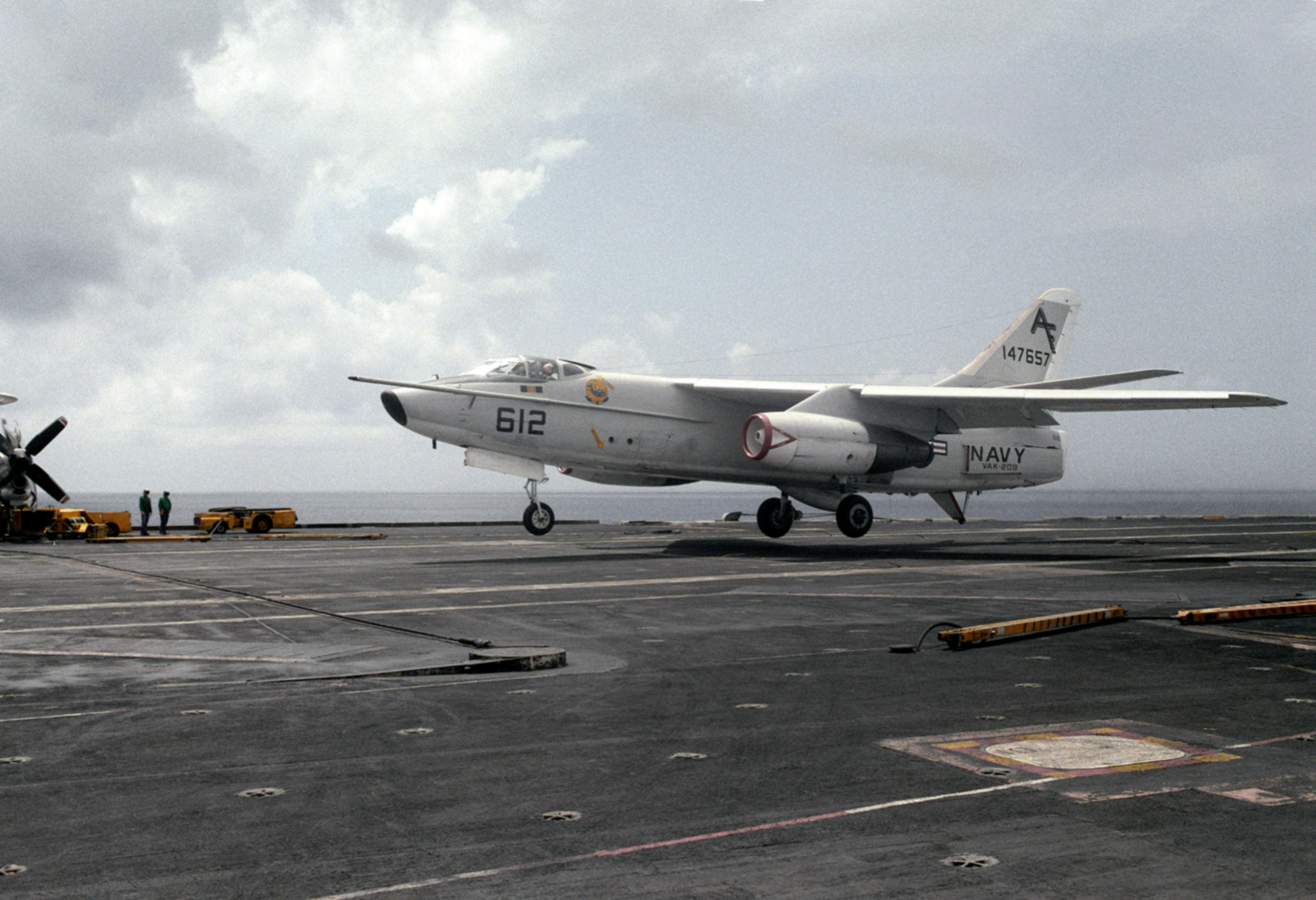
VAK-208 KA-3B lands on USS Dwight D. Eisenhower in 1985

VAK-208 was a United States Navy Tactical Aerial Refueling Squadron. The squadron was established on 30 July 1970 as a Tactical Electronic Warfare Squadron 208 (VAQ-208), redesignated as VAK-208 on 1 October 1979 and disestablished on 30 September 1989.

== Operational history ==
The squadron was established as part of a reorganization intended to increase the combat readiness of the Naval Air Reserve Force. It was to provide electronic warfare, aerial refueling, pathfinding and carrier onboard delivery service to the Atlantic and Pacific Fleets and other units around the world. During its lifetime it provided these services to numerous operations in places such as Kuwait, Israel, Cyprus and France, and was embarked on many different aircraft carriers. Its electronic warfare capability was removed in 1979, when it became primarily a tanker squadron.

== Home port assignments ==
The squadron was assigned to these home ports:

- NAS Alameda

== Aircraft assignment ==
- KA-3B Skywarrior

== See also ==
- History of the United States Navy
- List of inactive United States Navy aircraft squadrons
