= VFA-201 =

Strike Fighter Squadron 201
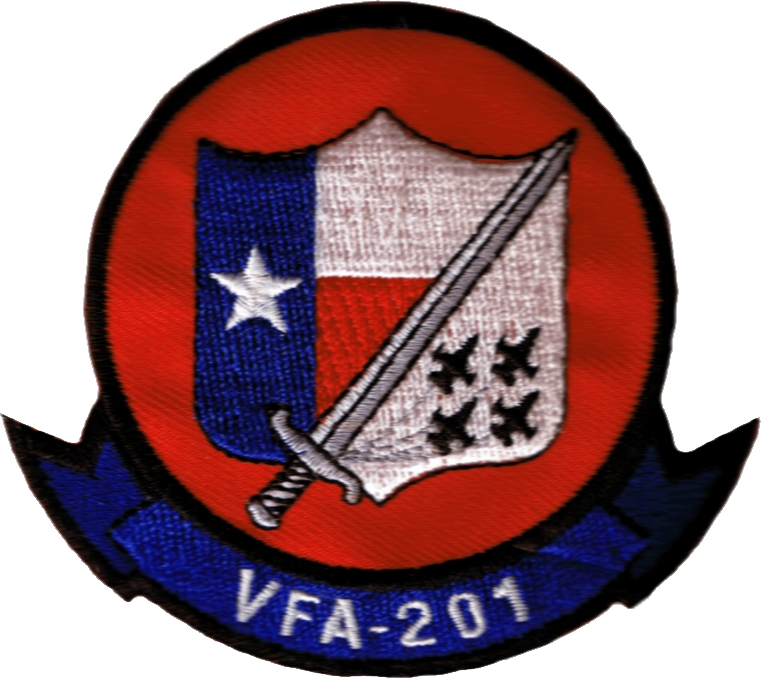
- VFA-201 insignia
- Active: 25 July 1970 – 24 March 2007
- Country: United States
- Branch: United States Navy Reserve
- Type: reserve fighter squadron
- Part of: Reserve Carrier Air Wing 20
- Garrison/HQ: Naval Air Station Joint Reserve Base Fort Worth
- Nickname(s): "Hunters"

The VFA-201, Strike Fighter Squadron was an aviation unit of the United States Naval Reserve based at Naval Air Station Joint Reserve Base Fort Worth, Texas (USA). It was established in 1970 as part of Reserve Carrier Air Wing 20 (CVWR-20) and deactivated in 2007. During its service VFA-201 could be identified by the tail code "AF" and nose numbers (MODEX) in the "100" series, typically 100 to 113. The squadron's nickname was the Hunters.

== History ==
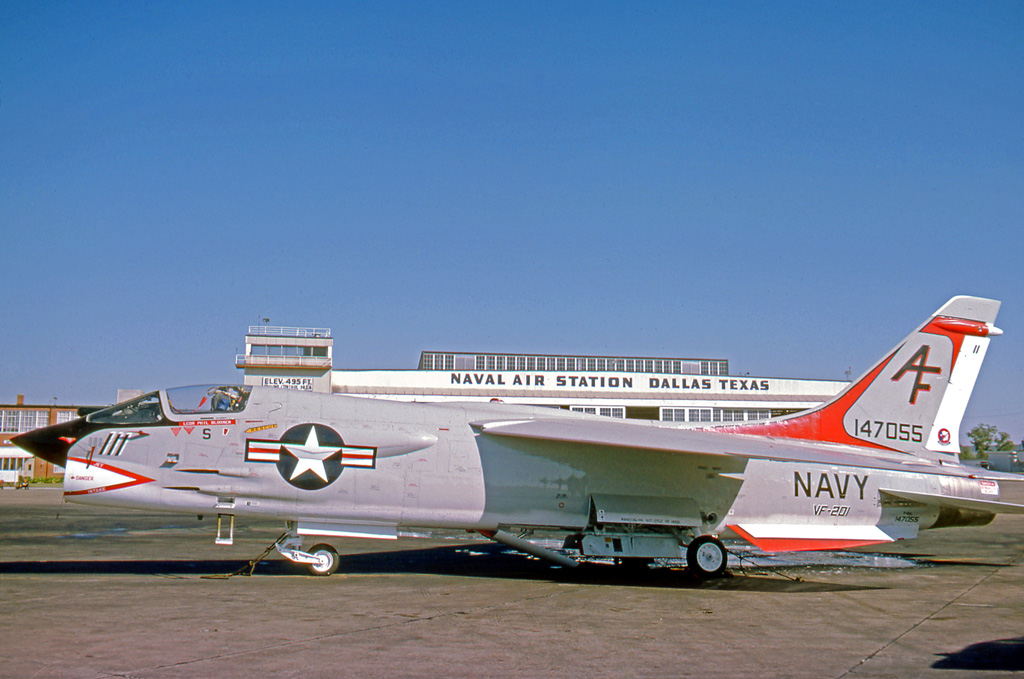
Vought F-8H Crusader II of VF-201 at Naval Air Station Dallas in October 1975

The United States Naval Reserve fighter squadron VF-201 was established at NAS Dallas on 25 July 1970, succeeding VF-124D1. It first flew the Vought F-8H Crusader, and in 1976 it transitioned to the McDonnell Douglas F-4N Phantom II. In 1984, the squadron transitioned to the F-4S Phantom II, the most advanced Phantom to enter service with the United States Navy. Soon the U.S. Navy moved to the policy that reserve units would have the same equipment as front line units, VF-201 transitioned to the Grumman F-14A Tomcat in early 1987 and was the last Navy squadron to fly the F-4. It took six months to complete the transition and soon VF-201 was carrier qualified on board the aircraft carrier USS Forrestal (CV-59). Even some of the F-14As received came directly from the production line at Grumman, and the unit received the final F-14A ever built. Within years the squadron was capable of dropping unguided bombs, cluster munitions TALD decoys, air laid mines, practice bombs, marker flares and various laser-guided bombs as the F-14 was reconfigured as a strike fighter. In 1993 they won the Battle "E" award and in 1994 the Chief of Naval Operations (CNO) Safety "S" award. The strike capability of the F-14 has been proven in exercises such as the deployment the squadron made to NAS Fallon in 1995 as part of training for the reserve air wing CVWR-20.

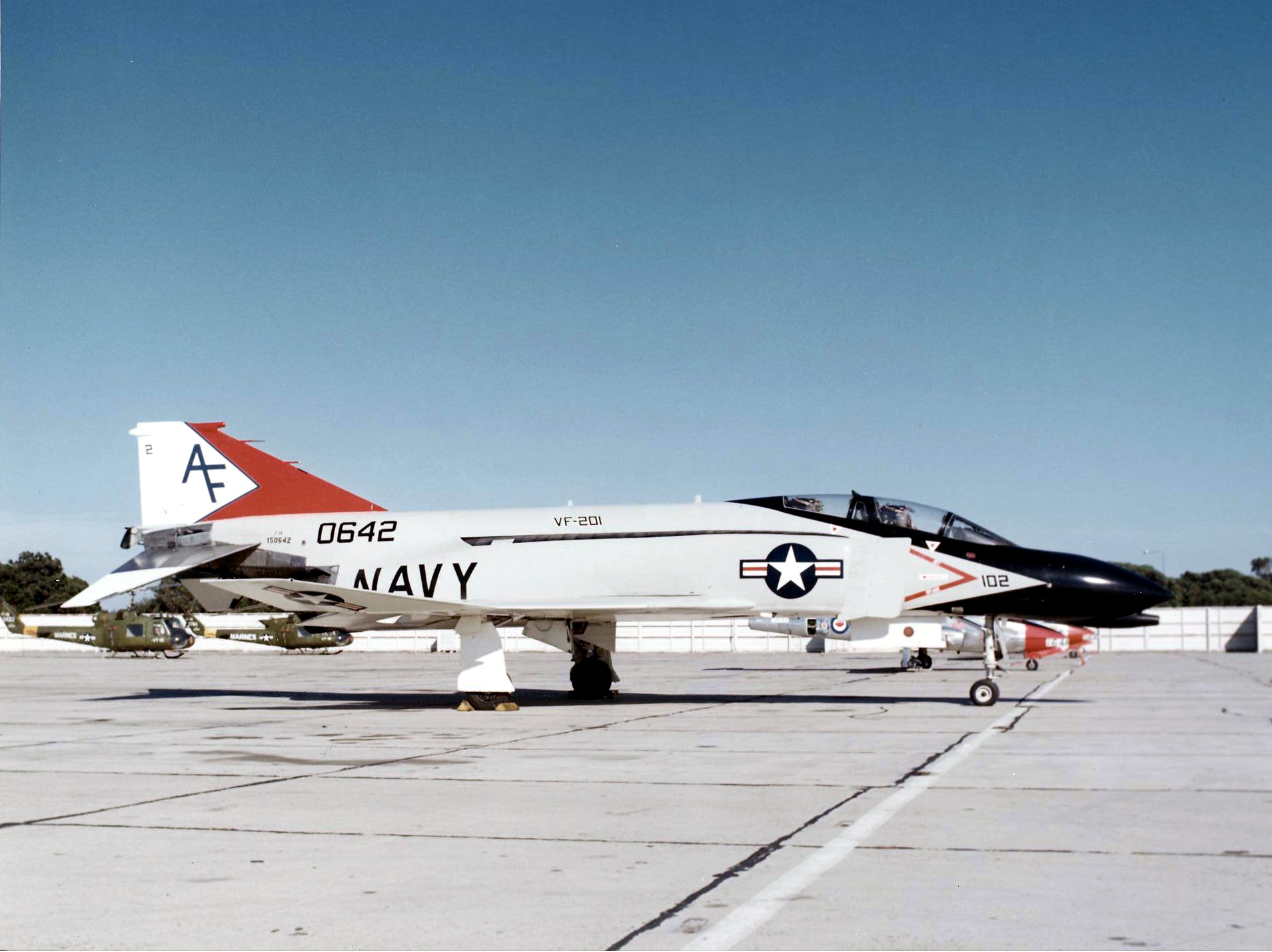
A VF-201 F-4N in 1976.

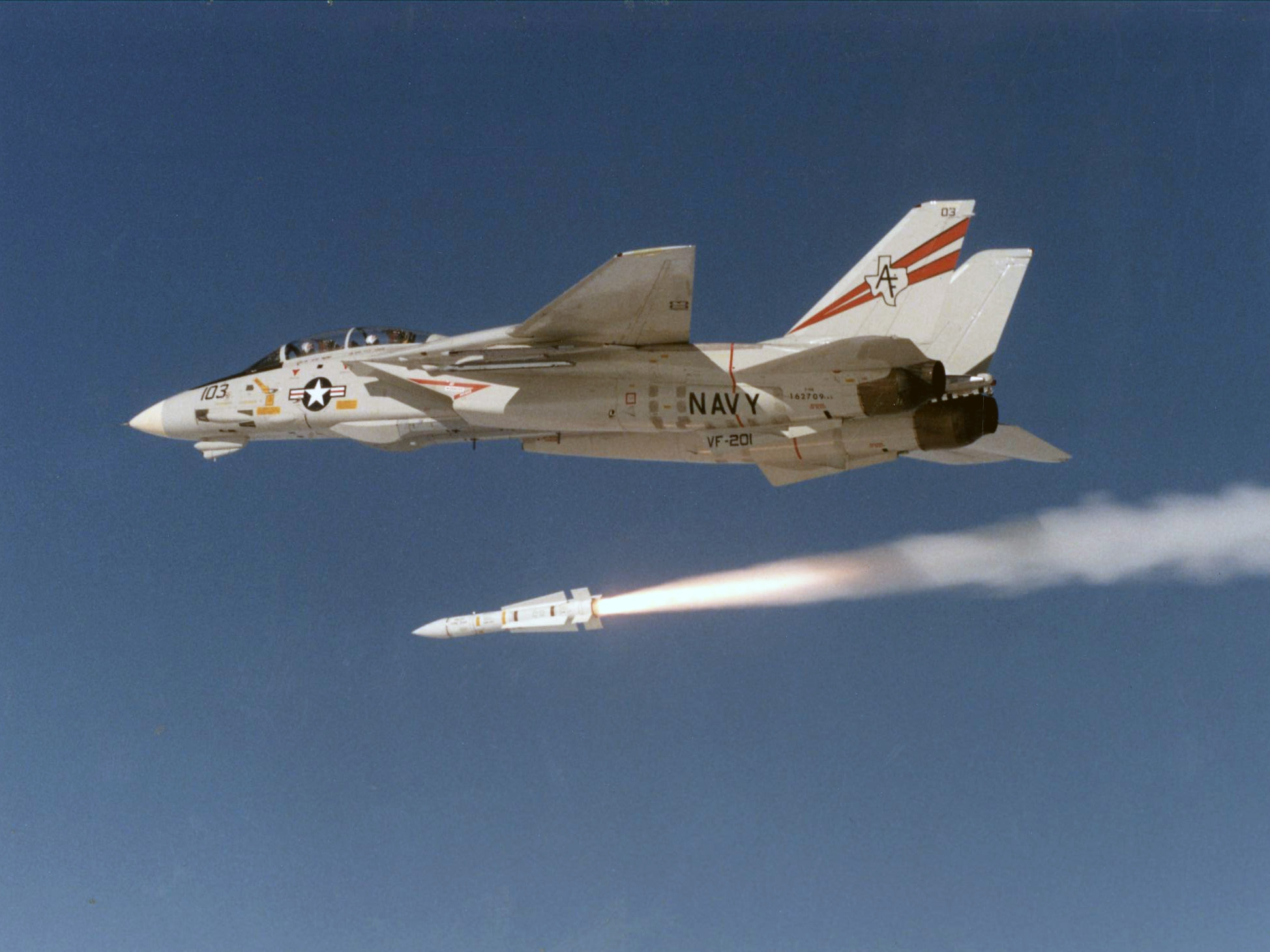
An F-14A of VF-201, 1987.

Hornets of VFA-201 over New Orleans in May 2006.

Later the unit would also be able to conduct TARPS reconnaissance missions, which were originally carried out by VF-202. But as some front line F-14 squadrons saw disestablishment during the 1990s, so did the two reserve fighter squadrons and VF-202 was disestablished. Due to budgetary cutbacks in active fleet aggressor squadrons, VF-201 also began flying as aggressors when needed. In 1996 VF-201, along with the rest of RCVW-20, deployed on the USS John C. Stennis (CVN-74), during this deployment VF-201 had the opportunity to fire live weapons. The unit fired 7 AIM-9 Sidewinders, 6 AIM-7 Sparrows and 1 AIM-54 Phoenix, two additional Phoenix missiles were planned to be fired but due to technical difficulties this was aborted. VF-201 also dropped 17,000 lb of bombs.

In July 1996 VF-201 deployed to NAS Key West in Florida to provide dissimilar air training for VFA-106 Gladiators, the U.S. East Coast F/A-18 training squadron. In August and September the same year, VF-201 deployed to NAS Oceana and got to fire two Phoenix missiles as well as participating in the SFARP (Strike Fighter Air Readiness Program) course. In November 1996 VF-201 deployed to NAS Fallon where they provided Dissimilar Air Combat Training (DACT) for Carrier Air Wing Two. After this deployment to NAS Fallon, VF-201 moved to NAS Fort Worth.

In 1997 the Hunters deployed for three days with six aircraft to Elmendorf AFB, Alaska for Exercise "Arctic Express 1-97". Originally this deployment had been scheduled for an active F-14 squadron, but they were unable to attend and so VF-201 filled the slot. Less than two weeks later. In late January, VF-201 took part in a scheduled deployment to NAS Fallon and the squadron dropped 195,000 lb of ordnance and shoot 3500 rounds of 20 mm cannon ammo. In March, VF-201 deployed to NAS Key West for a two-week detachment providing training to new F-14 crews from VF-101.

In January 1999 the Hunters transitioned to the McDonnell Douglas F/A-18A Hornet because the F-14 Tomcat was out of production and the Navy senior leadership wanted the F-14As in the Naval Air Reserve reassigned back to active duty F-14 squadrons. VF-201 was re-designated VFA-201 to signify its new multi-mission capability as a strike fighter squadron.

Some of their deployments included: Carrier detachments: USS Dwight D. Eisenhower, USS John F. Kennedy, USS Kitty Hawk, and the USS John C. Stennis.

Tours of Duty locations: Roosevelt Roads, Puerto Rico, Sigonella Airbase, Sicily, Key West NAS, FL., Fallon, NV., Oceana, VA., Point Magu, CA., and Eglin AFB, FL.

=== 2003 combat deployment ===
VFA-201 was the seventh tactical Navy reserve squadron mobilized since the Korean War (three East Coast based and three West Coast based USNR squadrons were activated during the Vietnam war on 28 January 1968), and were one of three reserve squadrons to deploy for combat operations (the other two were HCS-4 and HCS-5). After completing the Strike Fighter Advanced Readiness Program (SFARP) from their home base in Fort Worth and the Carrier Air Wing Eight coordinated strike detachment in Fallon, Nevada, they deployed on board USS Theodore Roosevelt (CVN-71) from 6 January to 29 May 2003, where they received numerous awards for their performance over Iraq during the first phases of Operation Iraqi Freedom. In fact, the squadron delivered over 220,000 pounds of ordnance on Iraq targets. Additionally, VFA-201 had an unprecedented 84.6 target acquisition rate during Iraqi Freedom and won the Carrier Air Wing Eight landing grade competition for their entire workup and combat deployment. Eighteen of the nineteen pilots deployed were graduates of TOPGUN.

=== Decommissioning ===
VFA-201 was officially deactivated on 30 June 2007, and all hardware assets were transferred to their Reserve sister squadron, VFA-204, or other active-duty Navy and Marine Corps units.

== Notable members ==
- John M. Lounge, astronaut

== See also ==
- History of the United States Navy
- List of inactive United States Navy aircraft squadrons
- List of United States Navy aircraft squadrons
