= VFC-204 =

Fighter Squadron Composite 204
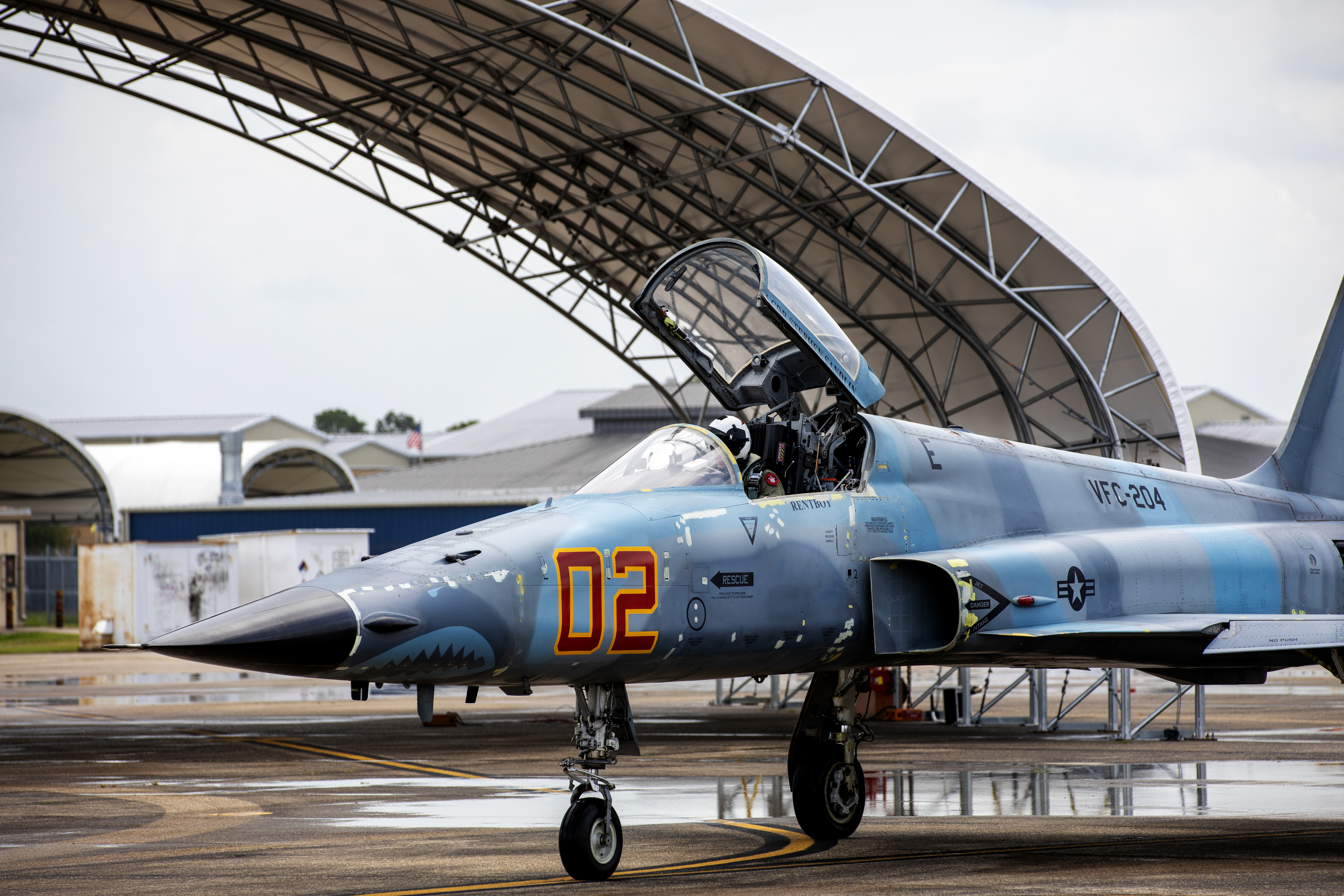
- Squadron F-5N Tiger II at NAS JRB New Orleans in 2023
- Active: 1 July 1970 – present (56 years, 2 months)
- Country: United States
- Branch: United States Navy
- Type: Adversary Squadron
- Part of: United States Navy Reserve: Naval Air Force Reserve; Tactical Support Wing
- Garrison/HQ: Naval Air Station Joint Reserve Base New Orleans, Louisiana
- Nickname: "River Rattlers"
- Colors: Blue and Orange

Insignia
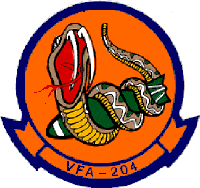
- VFA-204 insignia

Aircraft flown
- Attack: A-4 Skyhawk; A-7 Corsair II
- Fighter: F/A-18A/A+/C/D Hornet; F-5N/F Tiger II

Fighter Squadron Composite 204 (VFC-204), also known as the "River Rattlers", is a United States Navy Reserve adversary squadron, flying the F-5N/F Tiger II, after having previously flown the F/A-18C/D Hornet. The squadron is based at Naval Air Station Joint Reserve Base New Orleans, Louisiana, and is part of the U.S. Navy Reserve's Tactical Support Wing. Their radio callsign is "River" and their tail code is "AF".

== Squadron insignia and nickname ==
The squadron’s insignia and nickname River Rattlers were approved by Chief of Naval Operations on 31 August 1970.

== History ==
=== 1970s ===
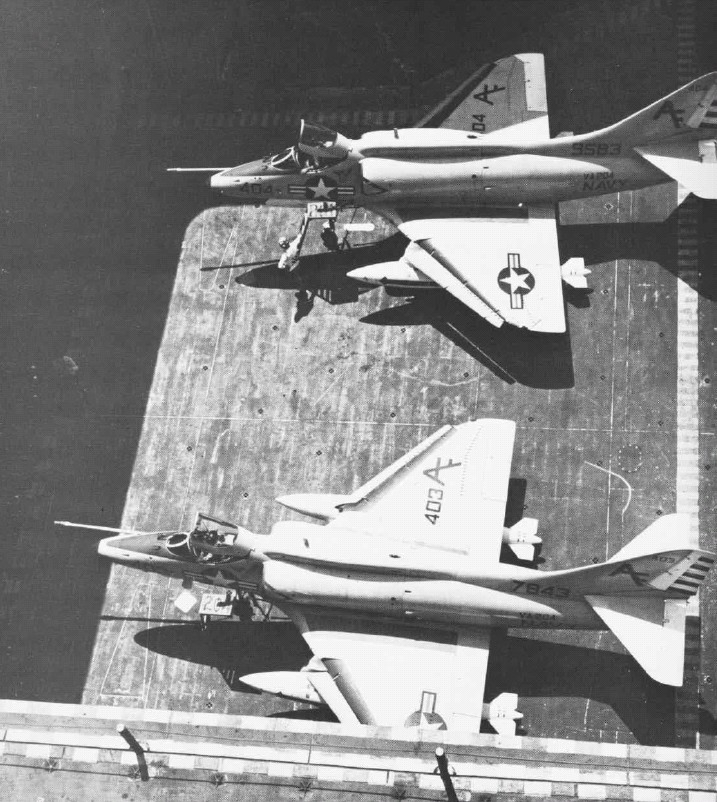
VA-204 A-4s aboard USS Coral Sea

Attack Squadron 204 (VA-204) was established at NAS Memphis, Tennessee on 1 July 1970, flying the A-4C Skyhawk as part of a reorganization intended to increase the combat readiness of the Naval Air Reserve Force. The squadron was assigned to Carrier Air Wing Reserve 20 (CVWR-20). Shortly after transitioning to the A-4E Skyhawk in 1971, the squadron deployed for two weeks with CVWR-20 embarked on the aircraft carrier USS John F. Kennedy, a Naval Reserve first.

VA-204 won back to back CVWR-20 Bombing Derbies in 1971 and 1972. In May 1972, the squadron participated in exercise Exotic Dancer V, designed to test multiservice operations under a unified command organization. VA-204 received the CNO annual Safety Award for 1973, in recognition of over 5,000 hours of accident free flying for the year. In 1975, the squadron won the F. Trubee Davison Award as the "Best Tailhook Squadron in the Naval Reserve"

The squadron was directed to cease flight operations in December 1977 and transfer all A-4 aircraft in custody. In complying with that directive, VA-204 closed the final chapter in the United States Navy's single seat Skyhawk attack aviation era. In March 1978, the squadron moved from NAS Memphis to NAS New Orleans and began receiving A-7B Corsair II aircraft. In 1979 the squadron deployed to MCAS Yuma, Arizona, NAS Fallon, Nevada, and embarked on USS Independence.

=== 1980s ===
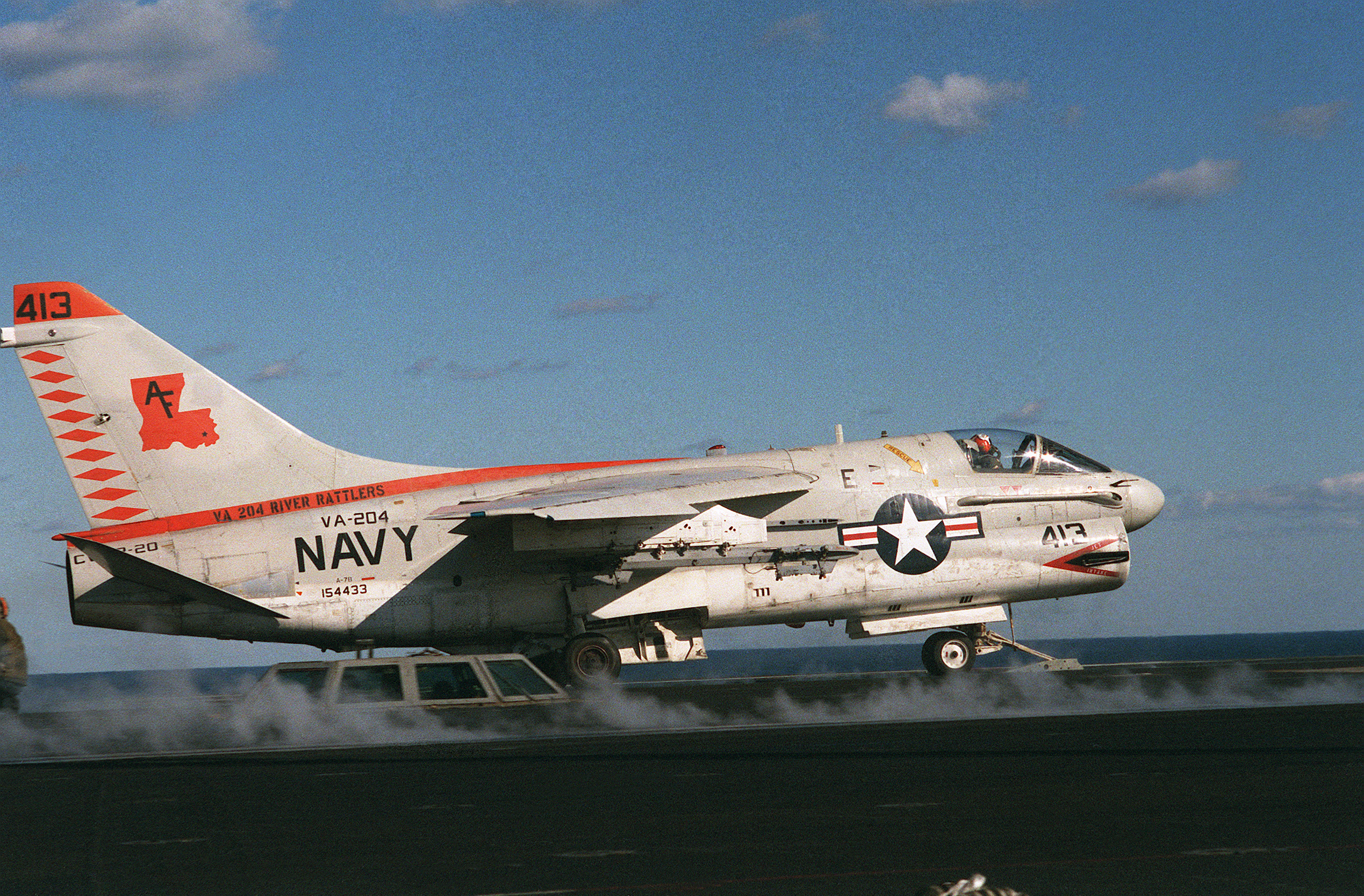
VA-204 A-7E launches from USS Dwight D. Eisenhower in 1986

In 1980 the squadron completed numerous deployments ranging from Exercise Safe Passage, a combined NATO forces exercise conducted near NAS Bermuda in the Western Atlantic, to detachments at NAS Fallon. VA-204 again was selected as the winner of the CNO Safety Award for 1980.

The squadron earned the CNO Safety Award again in 1982 and 1983, and was nominated for the Noel Davis (Battle "E") in 1983. In 1984 the squadron won the CVWR-20 Golden Wrench Award and the Battle "E".

With transition from the A-7B to the A-7E completed in 1986, the squadron completed seven weapons detachments, three carrier qualification evolutions, air wing active duty to NAS Fallon and embarkation the USS Forrestal and USS Dwight D. Eisenhower.

=== 1990s ===
VA-204 transitioned to the F/A-18A Hornet in April 1991 and was redesignated Strike Fighter Squadron 204 (VFA-204) on 1 May 1991.

In 1992, the squadron conducted numerous detachments to NAS Cecil Field, Florida; NAS Fallon, Nevada; and NAS Key West, Florida. In June the same year, the squadron led an air wing mine warfare exercise. In November the squadron qualified 16 pilots aboard USS Dwight D. Eisenhower.

The squadron officially completed its transition to the F/A-18 Hornet in March 1993, and the next month began initial adversary training at NAS Oceana, Virginia. In October the squadron became the first Reserve Strike Fighter Squadron to provide adversary support to the active duty fleet during a one-week detachment to NAS Key West. In 1993, VFA-204 received its sixth CNO Safety Award, completing 13 years and 50,000 Class-A mishap free flight hours.

In December 1994, the squadron conducted carrier qualification aboard the USS Enterprise and ended the year by winning its second Battle "E". In addition, the squadron received their second F. Trubee Davison Award as 'Best Tailhook Squadron in the Naval Reserve'.

The Navy and Marine Corps Meritorious Unit Commendation was awarded to the squadron in 1995 for its successful transition from the A-7E to the F/A-18. In a February detachment to NAS Fallon, VFA-204 expended a record 302 tons of ordnance, smashing the squadron's old record of 128 tons delivered at Fallon in 1993.

During the summer of 1996, the squadron embarked in then what was the Navy's newest carrier, USS John C. Stennis. This detachment included the first ever night cyclic operations for the River Rattlers and another live fire missile exercise in the Virginia operations area.

=== 2000s ===
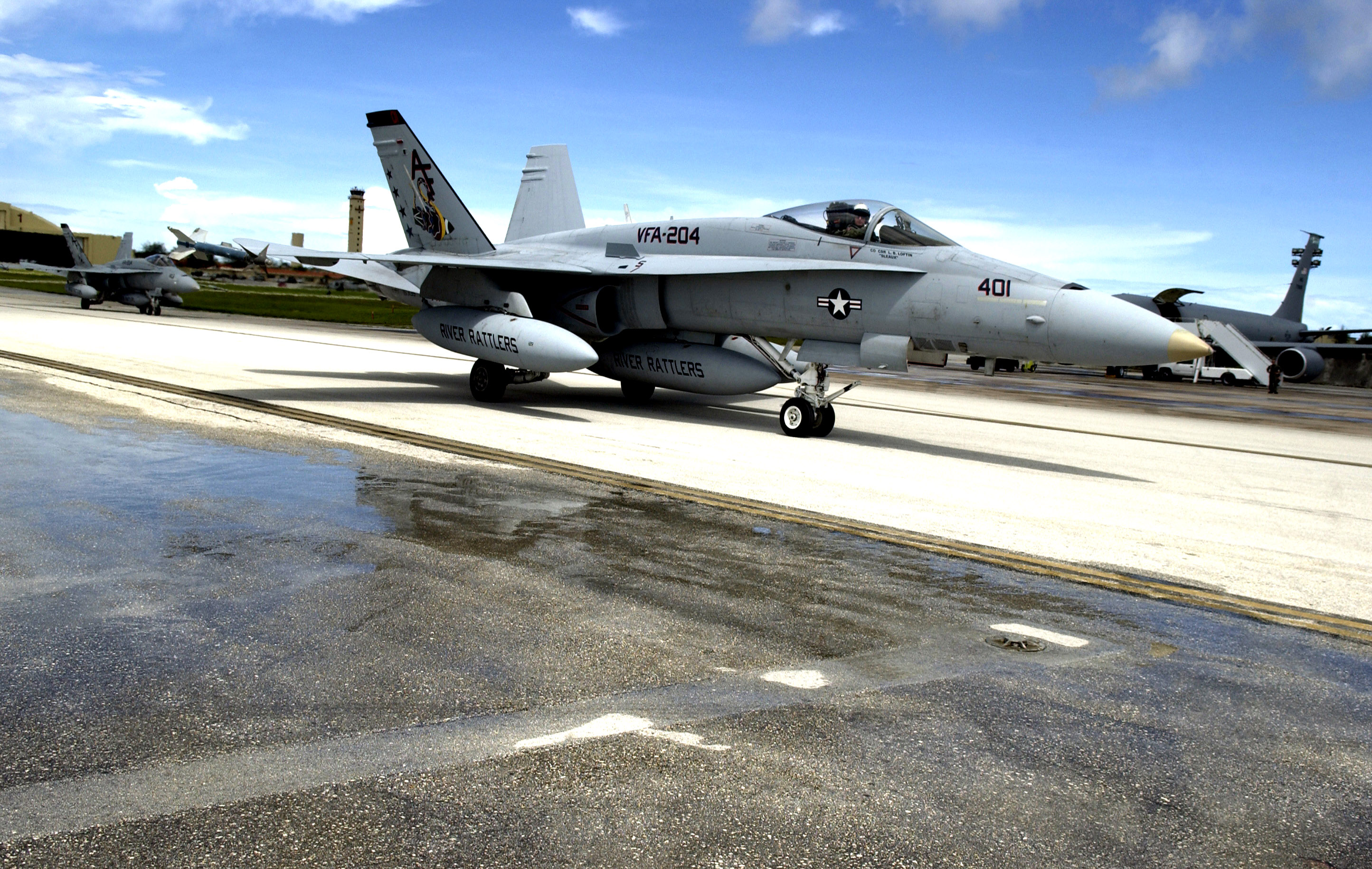
VFA-204 F/A-18A in 2007

Following the disestablishment of CVWR-20, VFA-204 continued to provide Fleet services as part of the Tactical Support Wing. The squadron provided adversary support in simulated fighter combat as well as large multi-plane strike exercises. The primary customers for this adversary support are the Navy's Fleet Replacement Squadrons (FRS) which train new pilots to fly the F/A-18E/F Super Hornet or the F/A-18A/C Hornet. VFA-204 provides this service by sending aircraft and personnel away on detachment, normally to either NAS Key West or NAS Fallon.

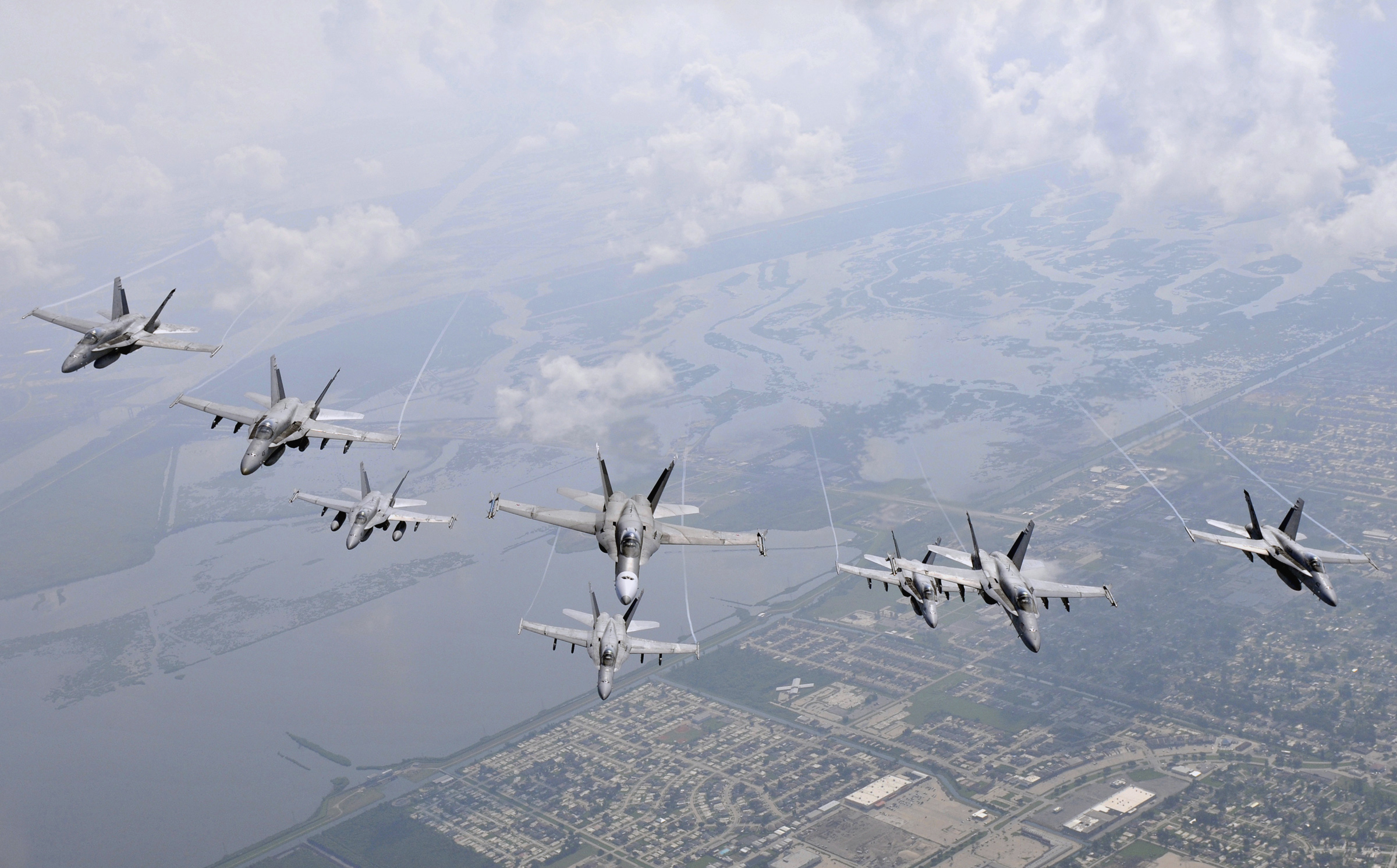
Squadron F/A-18 Hornets over Louisiana in 2009

VFA-204 also maintained the capability to mobilize to provide the Fleet with an additional combat ready F/A-18 Hornet squadron, should the need arise. To this end, the squadron routinely trained to the latest Strike Fighter mission employment tactics and occasionally conducts aircraft carrier landing qualifications. The squadron prepared for carrier qualifications by conducting Field Carrier Landing Practice (FCLPs) at their home field. FCLPs involve numerous "touch and go" landings on a runway area painted to resemble a carrier flight deck. Adjacent to the runway is a standard aircraft carrier optical landing system Fresnel lens. Each landing is observed and graded by a Landing Signal Officer, a pilot who has been trained in the subspecialty of teaching aviators how to safely land on an aircraft carrier.

=== 2020s ===
In April 2022, plans emerged that VFA-204 would be redesignated Fighter Squadron Composite 204 (VFC-204) in October 2022 and that the squadron is slated to transition to the F-5N/F Tiger II, with the required aircraft being transferred from VFC-13, another Navy adversary squadron. The NAS Fallon, Nevada-based VFC-13 would in turn receive recently retired F-16 Fighting Falcons from the U.S. Air Force.

As of 1 November 2022, the squadron has been redesignated Fighter Squadron Composite 204 (VFC-204).

== In popular culture ==
VFA-204 made several appearances in the 2003 film Tears of the Sun starring Bruce Willis. In the film, the squadron flies several F/A-18A Hornets from the USS Harry S. Truman alongside several SH-60B Seahawk helicopters from HSL-37 stationed in Hawaii. The weapons seen being fired during the film were also done with special effects and pyrotechnics, not actual AGM-84E SLAM Standoff Land Attack Missiles.

== See also ==
- Naval aviation
- Modern US Navy carrier air operations
- List of United States Navy aircraft squadrons
- List of Inactive United States Navy aircraft squadrons
