= VFA-203 =

Strike Fighter Squadron 203
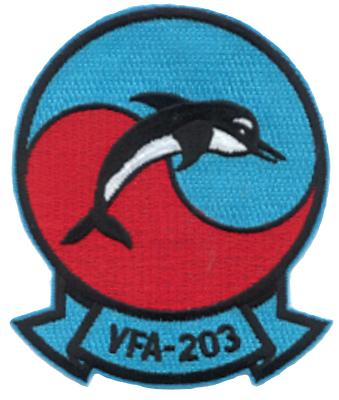
- VFA-203 insignia
- Active: 1 July 1970 – 30 June 2004
- Country: United States
- Branch: United States Navy Reserve
- Type: Attack
- Part of: Inactive
- Nickname(s): Blue Dolphins

Aircraft flown
- Attack: A-4C/E Skyhawk; A-7A/B/E Corsair; F/A-18A Hornet

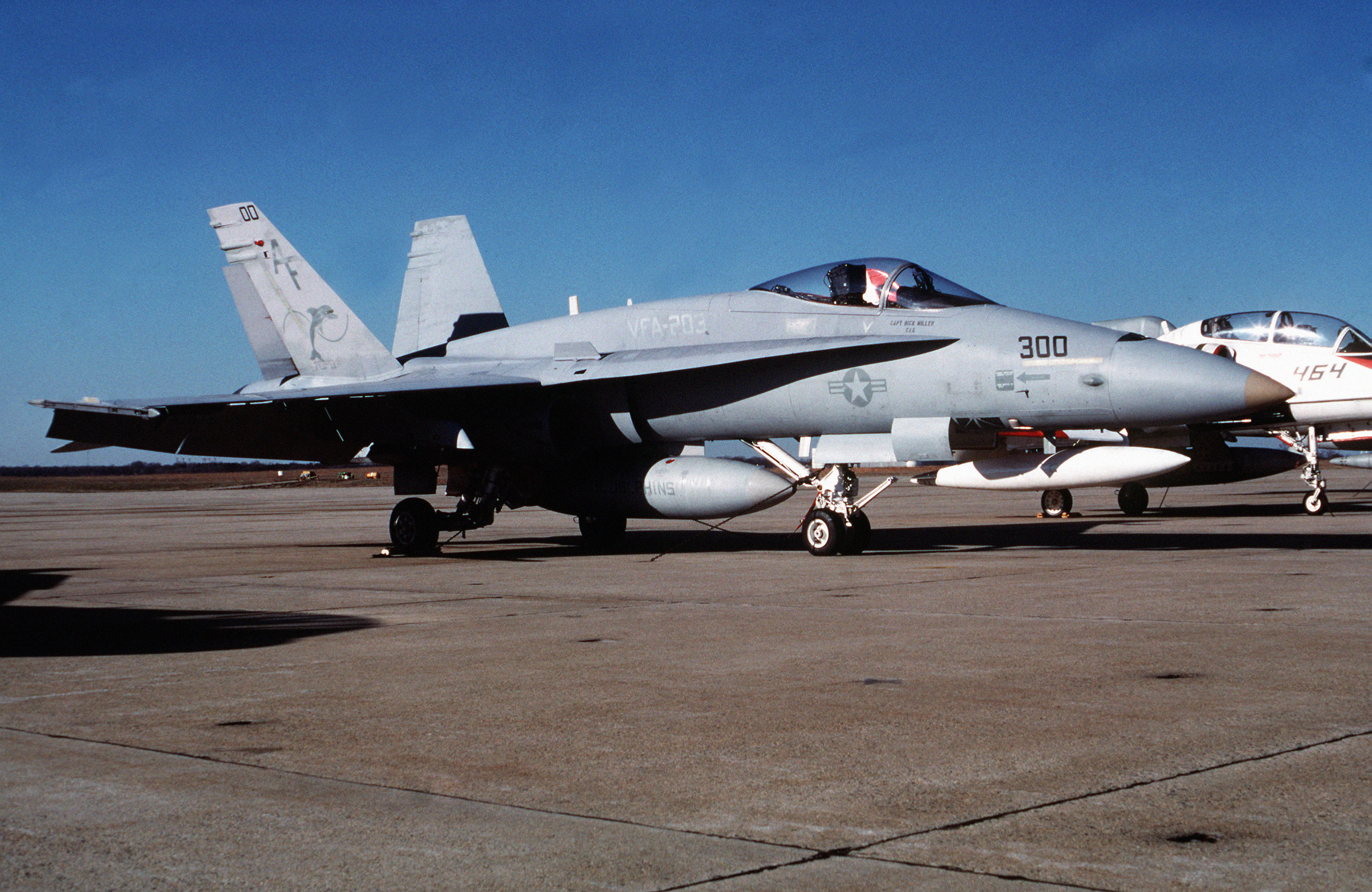
VFA-203 F/A-18A at Andrews Air Force Base in 1990

VFA-203, nicknamed the Blue Dolphins, was a Strike Fighter Squadron of the U.S. Naval Reserve. It was established as Attack Squadron 203 (VA-203) flying the A-4 Skyhawk at NAS Jacksonville, Florida on 1 July 1970, as a reserve force squadron (RESFORON) under a new concept in the reorganization of the Naval Air Reserve Force. The reorganization was intended to make the reserves more compatible with active duty units and to increase their combat readiness. The squadron later relocated to NAS Cecil Field, Florida and transitioned to A-7 Corsair II followed by the F/A-18 Hornet. Following the 1999 BRAC-directed closure of NAS Cecil Field, the squadron relocated to NAS Atlanta, Georgia. VFA-203 was deactivated on 30 June 2004 prior to the BRAC-directed closure of NAS Atlanta.

== Operational history ==
VA-203 was part of Reserve Carrier Air Wing TWENTY (CVWR-20) at NAS Cecil Field, with local Reserve-specific administrative support provided by Naval Air Reserve Jacksonville (NAVAIRES JAX) as the Local Area Coordinator for Air (LACAIR) for RESFORONs at NAS Jacksonville, NAS Cecil Field and NS Mayport.

In May 1972, the VA-203 deployed to NAS Oceana to participate in exercise Exotic Dancer V, designed to test multiservice operations under a unified command organization. On 1 December 1977, the squadron moved from NAS Jacksonville to NAS Cecil Field, Florida. In February 1980, the squadron participated in a combined NATO forces exercise conducted at NAS Bermuda.

Transitioning to the A-7E Corsair II in 1983, VA-203's primary mission was to provide contributory support to the fleet, and to be ready to deploy to an aircraft carrier during a crisis as an activated reserve light attack squadron. Following its transition to the F/A-18 Hornet, it was to be ready to deploy as an activated reserve strike-fighter squadron. A further mission was to act as adversaries to active duty Fleet fighter and strike fighter squadrons being trained for deployment.

In 1993, the squadron began training its pilots in the fleet adversary role. It moved to NAS Atlanta, Georgia, in October 1996 in advance of the 1999 BRAC closure of NAS Cecil Field.

== Aircraft assigned ==
The squadron operated the following aircraft, with the years received as shown:

- A-4 Skyhawk (1971)
- A-7 Corsair II: A-7A (1974), A-7B (1977), and A-7E (1983)
- F/A-18 Hornet (1989)

== See also ==
- History of the United States Navy
- List of inactive United States Navy aircraft squadrons
