= VF-202 =

Fighter Squadron 202
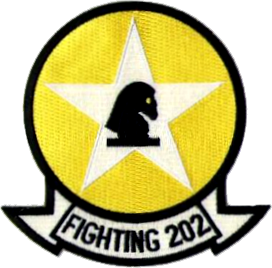
- VF-202 insignia
- Active: 1 July 1970 - 31 December 1994
- Country: United States
- Branch: United States Navy Reserve
- Type: reserve fighter squadron
- Part of: Reserve Carrier Air Wing 20
- Garrison/HQ: Naval Air Station Dallas
- Nickname: "Superheats"

Aircraft flown
- Fighter: F-8H Crusader; F-4N/S Phantom; F-14A Tomcat

Fighter Squadron 202 (VF-202) nicknamed the Superheats was an aviation unit of the United States Naval Reserve initially based at Naval Air Station Dallas, Texas. Following that installation's BRAC-directed closure, the squadron relocated to nearby former Carswell Air Force Base, which was transferred to U.S. Navy control according to BRAC action and renamed Naval Air Station Joint Reserve Base Fort Worth / Carswell Field. VF-202 was established on 1 July 1970 as part of Reserve Carrier Air Wing 20 (CVWR-20), the U.S. Atlantic Fleet's reserve carrier air wing, and disestablished on 31 December 1994. During its service VF-202 could be identified by the tail code "AF" and nose numbers (MODEX) "200" through "213."

== History ==
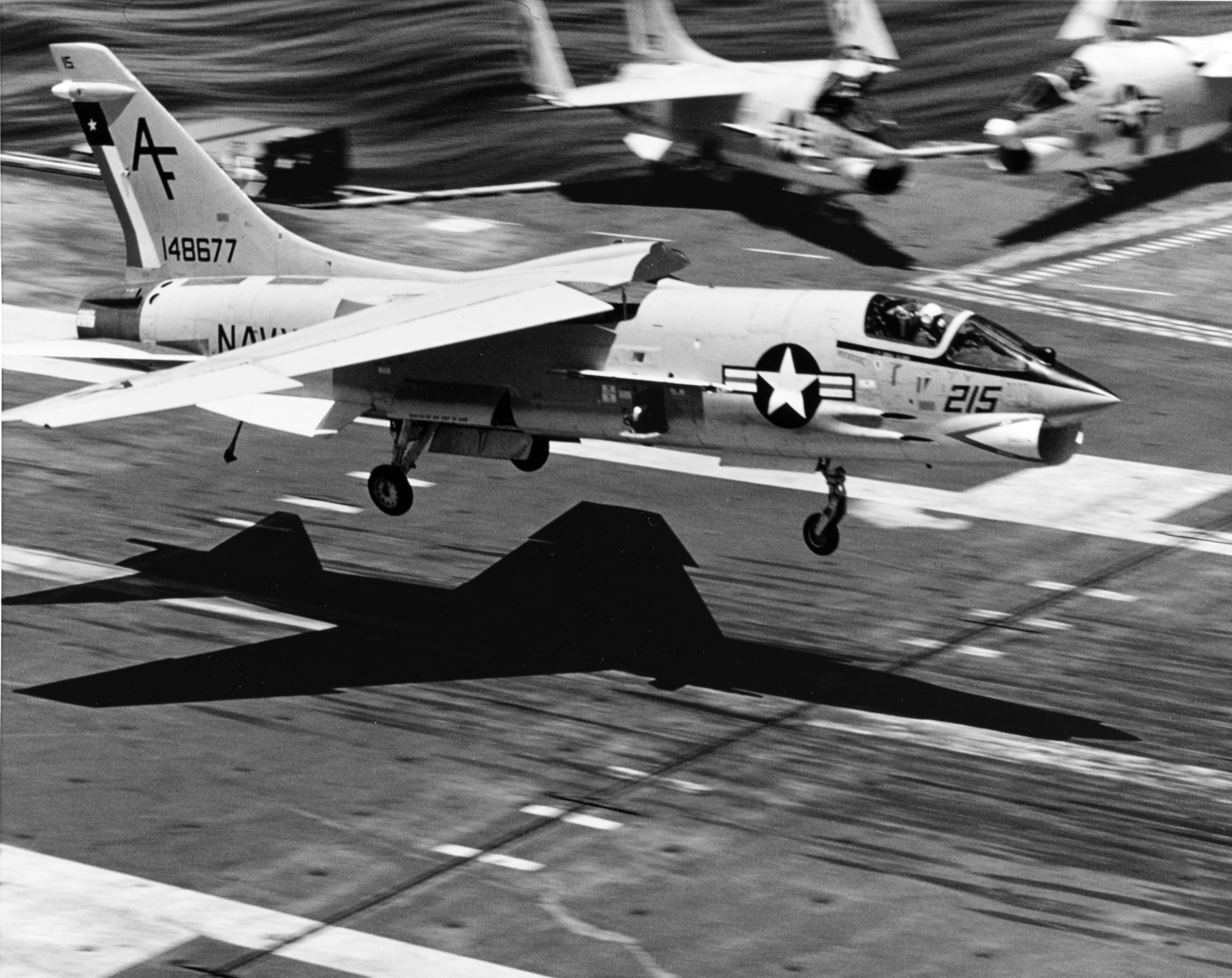
VF-202 F-8H landing on USS John F. Kennedy in 1971

VF-202 was established on 1 July 1970 out of Naval Reserve fighter squadron VF-53D2, this as part of a total revamping of the Naval Air Reserve following problems with the callup of Naval Reserve tactical aviation squadrons during the Pueblo crisis of 1968. This led to an effort to have carrier-based squadrons of the Naval Air Reserve mirror the active duty Regular Navy, with all Naval Reserve carrier aviation squadrons organized into two Reserve Carrier Air Wings (CVWR).

VF-202 first flew the Vought F-8H Crusader and transitioned to the F-4N Phantom II in 1976. In the 1980s, the squadron subsequently transitioned to the F-4S Phantom II

In 1987, VF-202 transitioned to new-build Block 110 versions of the F-14A Tomcat, the last F-14A version built, receiving their first aircraft on 27 March 1987. Due to the squadron's reserve status, the transition took longer than for an active unit, not being concluded until May 1988, when VF-202 carrier qualified with the F-14 aboard USS America.

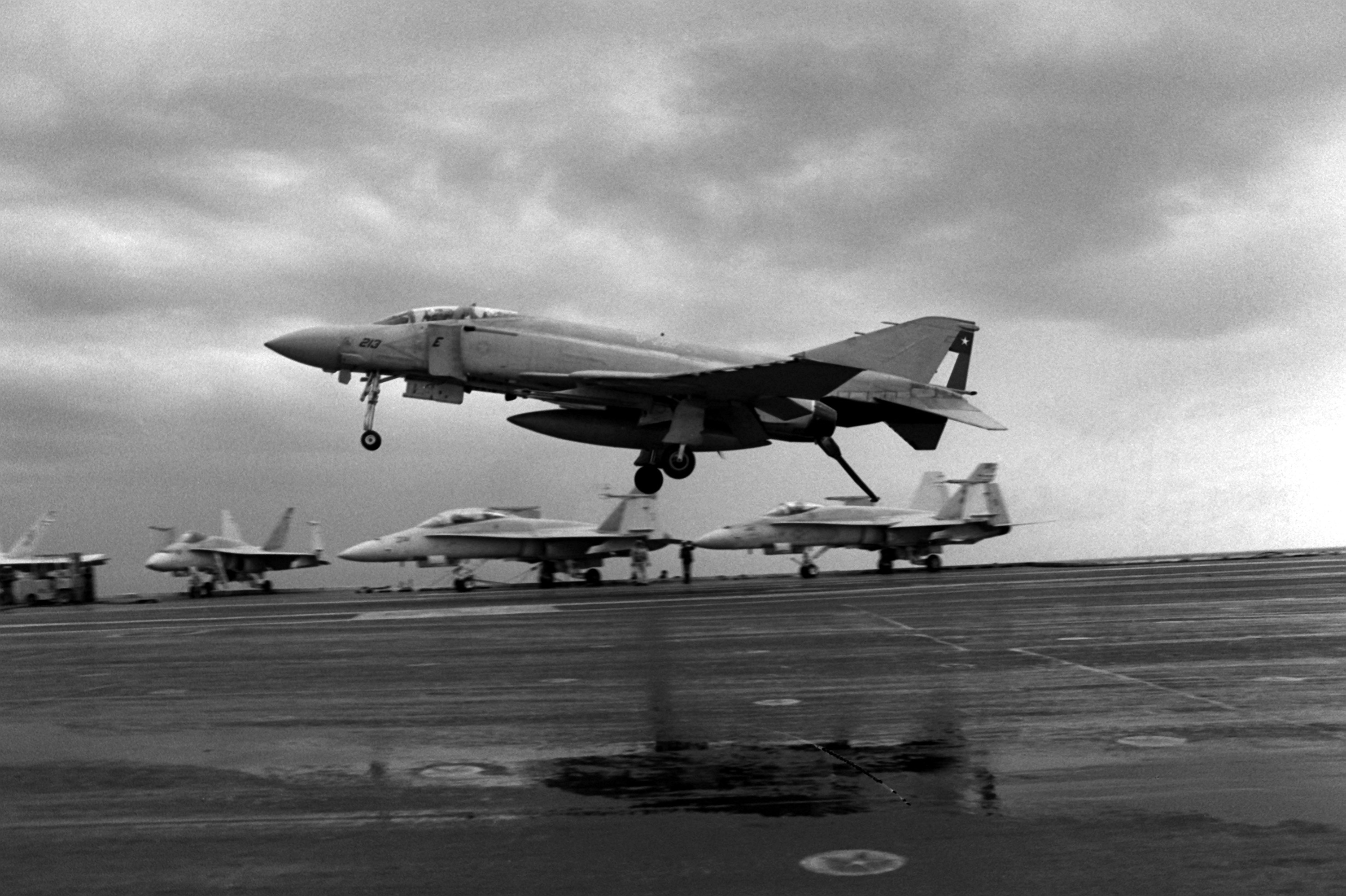
VF-202 F-4S making the last landing of a U.S. Navy F-4 aboard a carrier on 18 October 1986

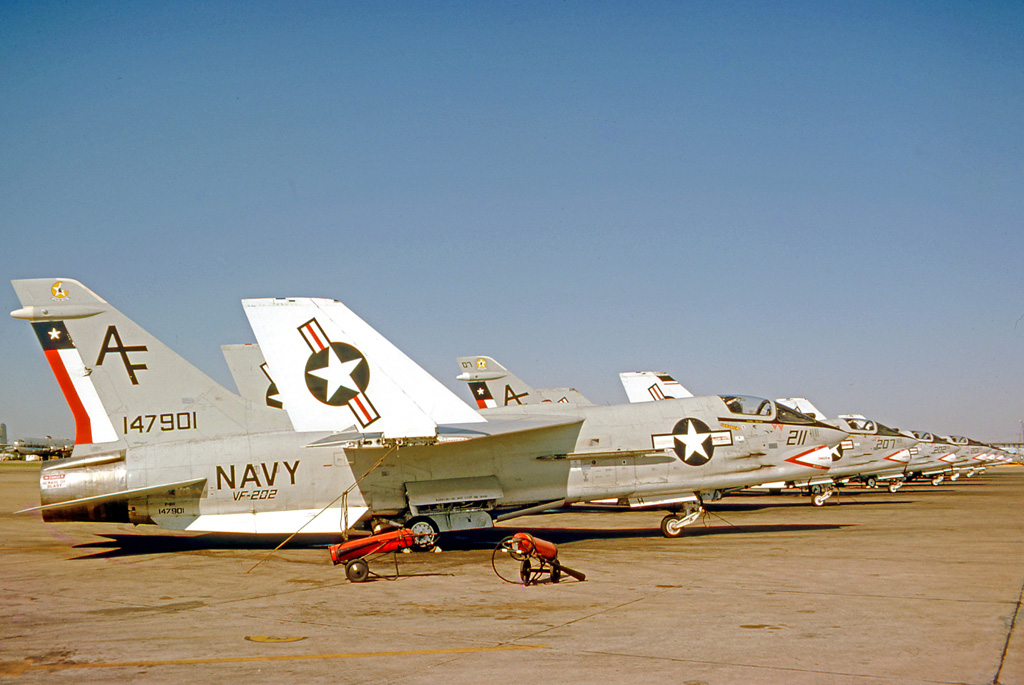
VF-202 F-8Hs at NAS Dallas in 1975

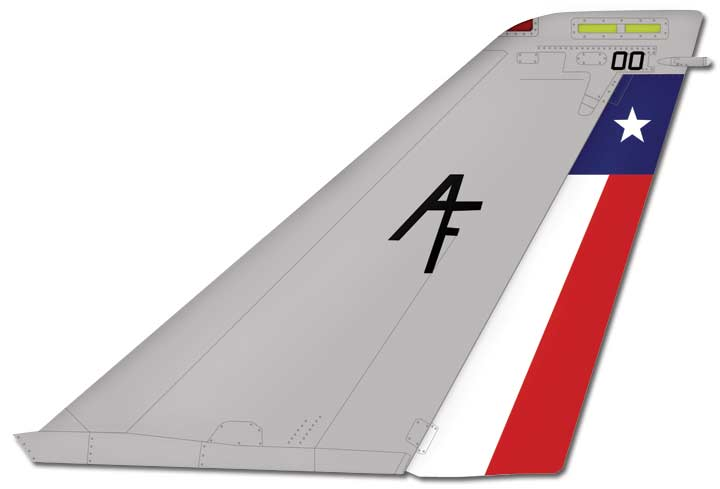
VF-202 F-14 tail markings

VF-202 was equipped with two nuclear strike-capable aircraft giving the squadron an extra task after the RA-5C Vigilante and RF-8G Crusader had been phased out of service. As a TARPS unit, 1988 saw the squadron take part in the Reconnaissance Air Meet at Bergstrom Air Force Base, Texas, along with several other F-14 squadrons, including the Pacific Fleet Replacement Squadron, VF-124. Even with the force reduction after the end of the Cold War and continuing budget cuts, one would have expected that the TARPS capable squadron would not be disestablished. However, it was decided to disestablish VF-202 and make their F-14 sister squadron, VF-201, TARPS capable. VF-202 was accordingly disestablished on 31 December 1994 and its aircraft redistributed to active duty F-14 squadrons, primarily the former Atlantic Fleet, and now sole F-14 Fleet Replacement Squadron, VF-101 at NAS Oceana, Virginia.

== Squadron awards ==
- Naval Reserve Tailhook Squadron of the Year ~ 1981
- Noel Davis Battle"E" Award ~ 1981, 1982, 1985, 1989
- Chief of Naval Operations Safety "S" Award ~1981, 1984, 1987, 1990
- CVWR-20 Retention Excellence Award ~ 1988, 1989 1992
- Meritorious Unit Commendation ~ 1988, 1989
- COMNAVAIRESFOR "Readiness through Safety Award" ~1989
- Worldwide Reconnaissance Air Meet (RAM) Best Navy/Marine Corps Team ~ 1990

In 1994 VF-202 received the highest CWTPI score in COMFITWINGLANT history. As cited by inspectors, "the most professional squadron ever observed".

== See also ==
- History of the United States Navy
- List of inactive United States Navy aircraft squadrons
- List of United States Navy aircraft squadrons
