= VA-209 (U.S. Navy) =

Attack Squadron 209
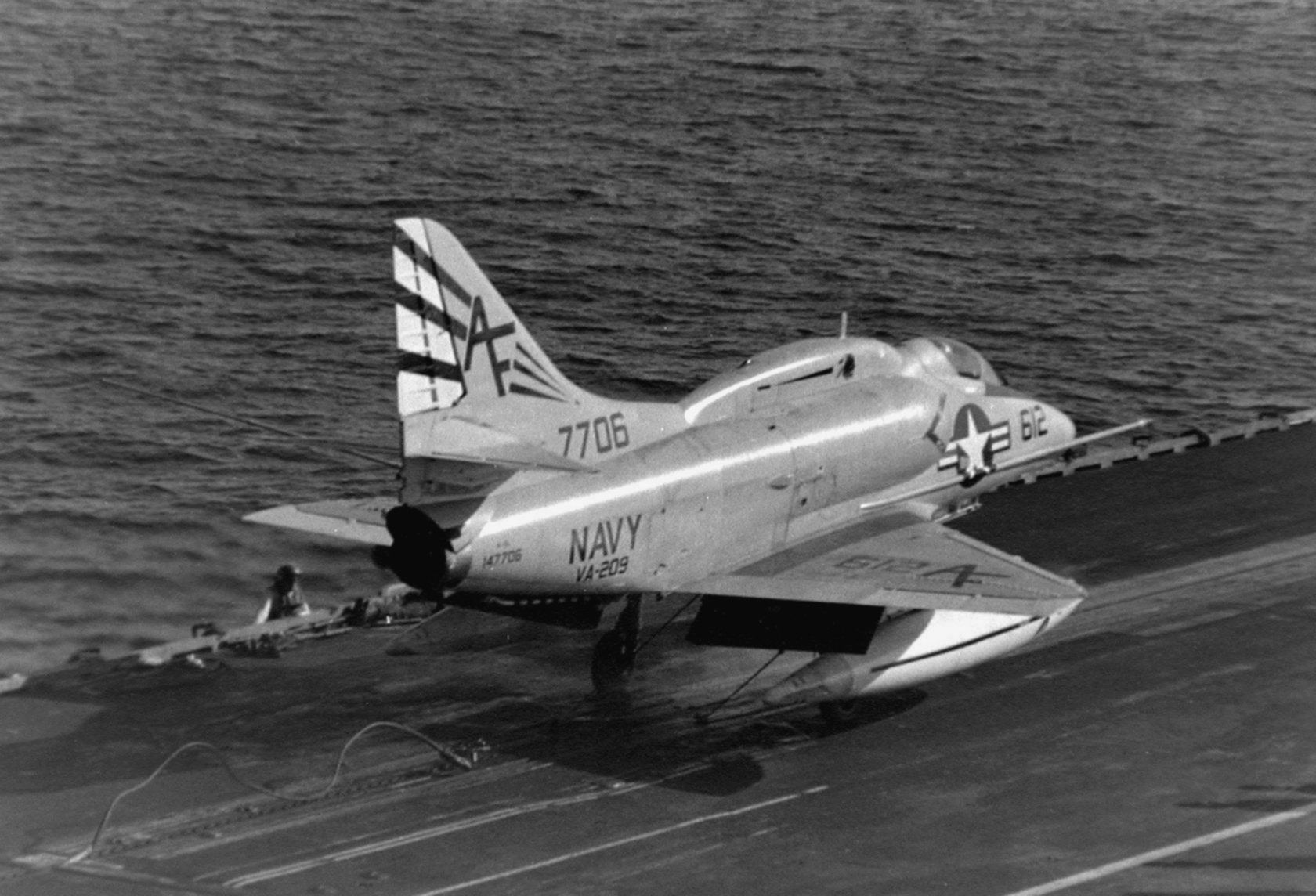
- VA-209 A-4L Skyhawk launching from USS Franklin D. Roosevelt, 1970
- Active: 1 July 1970 – 15 August 1971
- Country: United States
- Branch: United States Navy Reserve
- Type: Attack

Aircraft flown
- Attack: A-4L Skyhawk

VA-209 was a short-lived Attack Squadron of the U.S. Naval Reserve. It was established on 1 July 1970 as part of a reorganization intended to increase the combat readiness of the Naval Air Reserve Force. It was based at Naval Air Station Glenview, Illinois, and flew A-4L Skyhawk aircraft. The squadron was disestablished after one year's service, on 15 August 1971, being replaced by the addition of two fighter squadrons to Reserve Air Wing 20.

== See also ==
- List of squadrons in the Dictionary of American Naval Aviation Squadrons
- Attack aircraft
- List of inactive United States Navy aircraft squadrons
- History of the United States Navy
