= TALD =

TALD (an abbreviation for Things a Little Differently) is an American technology company that operates an online marketplace and matchmaking platform for interior design services. The platform functions as a two sided marketplace where users can search for designers, view portfolios, book video consultations, and hire professionals for design projects. Lounched in 2024, the platform connects homeowners and business clients with professional interior designers through collections of designer work examplesand consultation services.

== History ==
TALD was founded by Emily Shapiro, who transitioned to the design industry from a career in commercial real estate. TALD developed from an e-commerce project founded during the COVID-19 pandemic that sold home goods from independent artisans. After observing that professional interior designers represented a significant portion of the customer base, founder Emily Shapiro transitioned the business into a service oriented platform. The current model is designed to facilitate communication and project management between clients and design professionals.

The platform officially launched in early 2024 with an initial roster of 32 designers across 15 states.

== See also ==
- Interior design
