= VAW-78 =

Carrier Airborne Early Warning Squadron 78
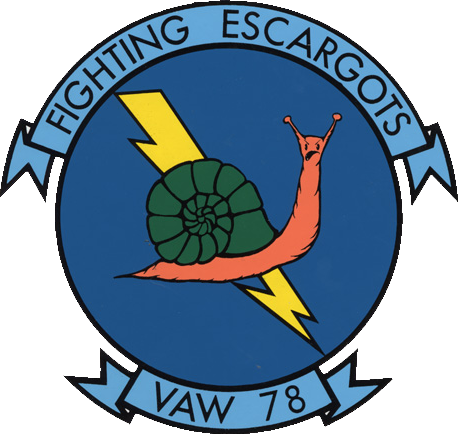
- Active: 1 October 1968 – 31 March 2005
- Country: United States of America
- Branch: United States Navy
- Type: Airborne Early Warning
- Nickname(s): "Fighting Escargots"

Aircraft flown
- Electronic warfare: E-2 Hawkeye; Grumman E-1 Tracer

Carrier Airborne Early Warning Squadron 78 (VAW-78), nicknamed the "Fighting Escargots" or "Slugs" was a reserve Carrier Airborne Early Warning Squadron of the U.S. Navy. It was established on 1 July 1970 as part of a major reorganization of the Naval Air Reserve and deactivated on 31 March 2005.

== Squadron History ==
=== 1970s ===
The Fighting Escargots was established in July 1970 at NAS Norfolk as a component of Anti-Submarine Group Reserve Seventy. The squadron initially operated the E-1B Tracer aircraft.

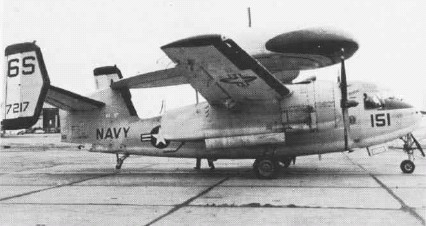
A Grumman E-1B Tracer of Naval Reserve airborne early warning squadron VAW-78 Fighting Escargots at NARTU Norfolk, Virginia (USA), in 1970.

In September 1975, VAW-78 became a component of Carrier Air Wing Reserve TWENTY. Two years later, the squadron transitioned to the E-2B "Hawkeye" aircraft. During March 1983, the first E-2C "Hawkeye" was introduced to the squadron and remains in use today. This milestone marked the first current tactical fleet aircraft to be utilized in the Naval Air Reserve.

=== 1980s ===
VAW-78 operated on board aircraft carriers on five extended periods for active duty training of its Navy Reserve personnel. The squadron participated in many exercises, including the UNITAS exercises with Latin American navies. The squadron also coordinated missile shoots and provided search and rescue support for Space Shuttle launches.

=== 1990s ===
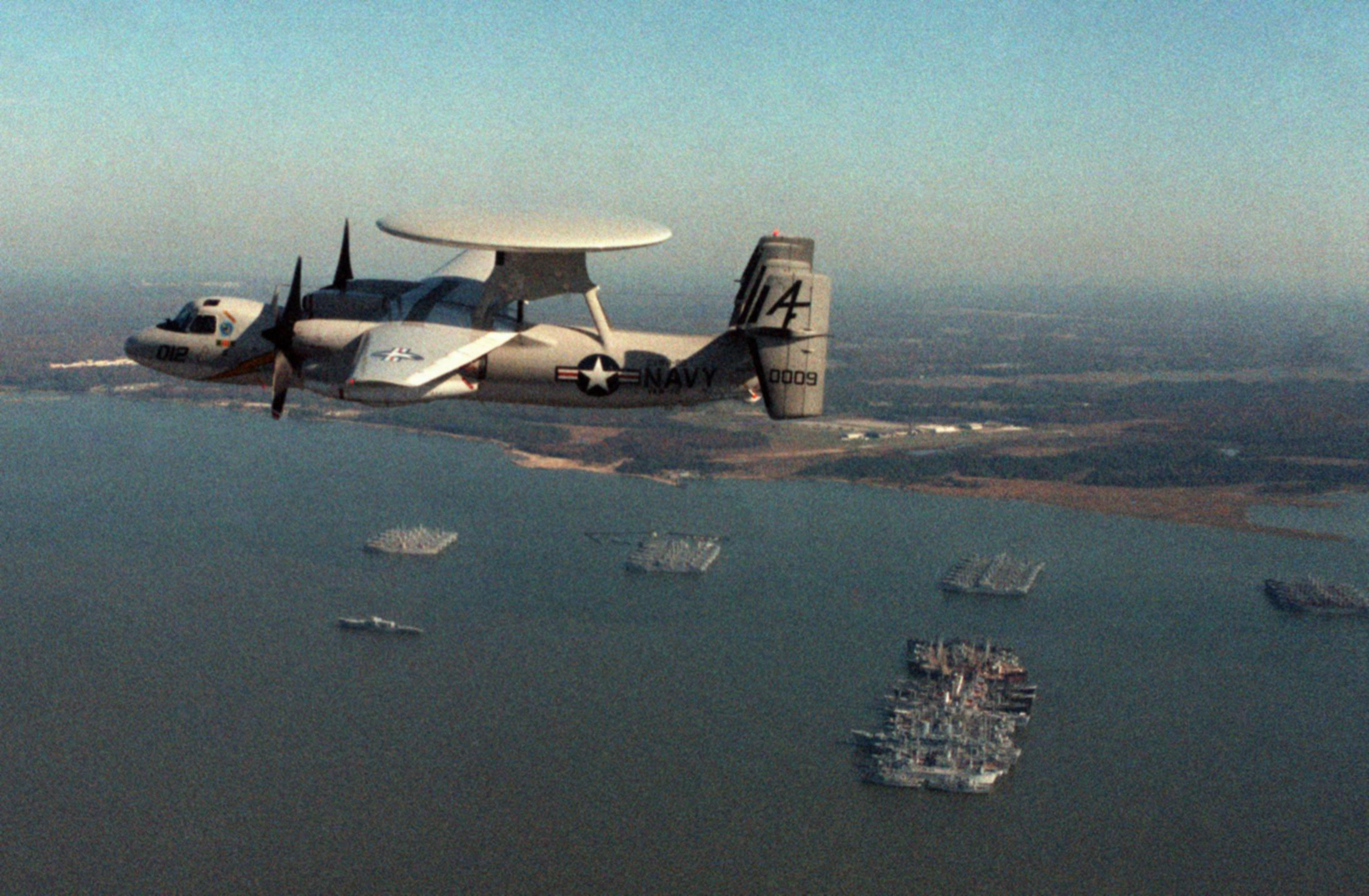
U.S. Navy E-2C Hawkeye of VAW-78 flies over the James River.

Its most important contribution was with the tracking and interdiction of drug running aircraft and vessels in the Caribbean area starting in the 1990s . In 1999, after Hurricane Floyd struck the U.S. East Coast, the squadron provided air control for federal, state, and local aircraft bringing relief to 20,000 flooded residents.

=== 2000s ===
VAW-78 was set to be deactivated 31 March 2005. Before being deactivated, VAW-78 transferred some of its aircraft to VAW-77 to replace older E-2Cs in that squadron.

== See also ==
- History of the United States Navy
- List of inactive United States Navy aircraft squadrons
