= VFP-206 =

Light Photographic Squadron 206
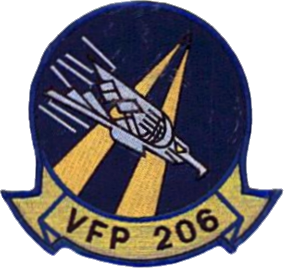
- VFP-206 squadron patch
- Active: 1 June 1970 – 29 March 1987
- Country: United States
- Branch: United States Navy Reserve
- Role: Photo-reconnaissance
- Part of: Inactive
- Nickname(s): Hawkeyes

VFP-206 was a Light Photographic Squadron of the United States Navy Reserve established on 1 June 1970. The squadron was disestablished on 29 March 1987.

== Operational history ==
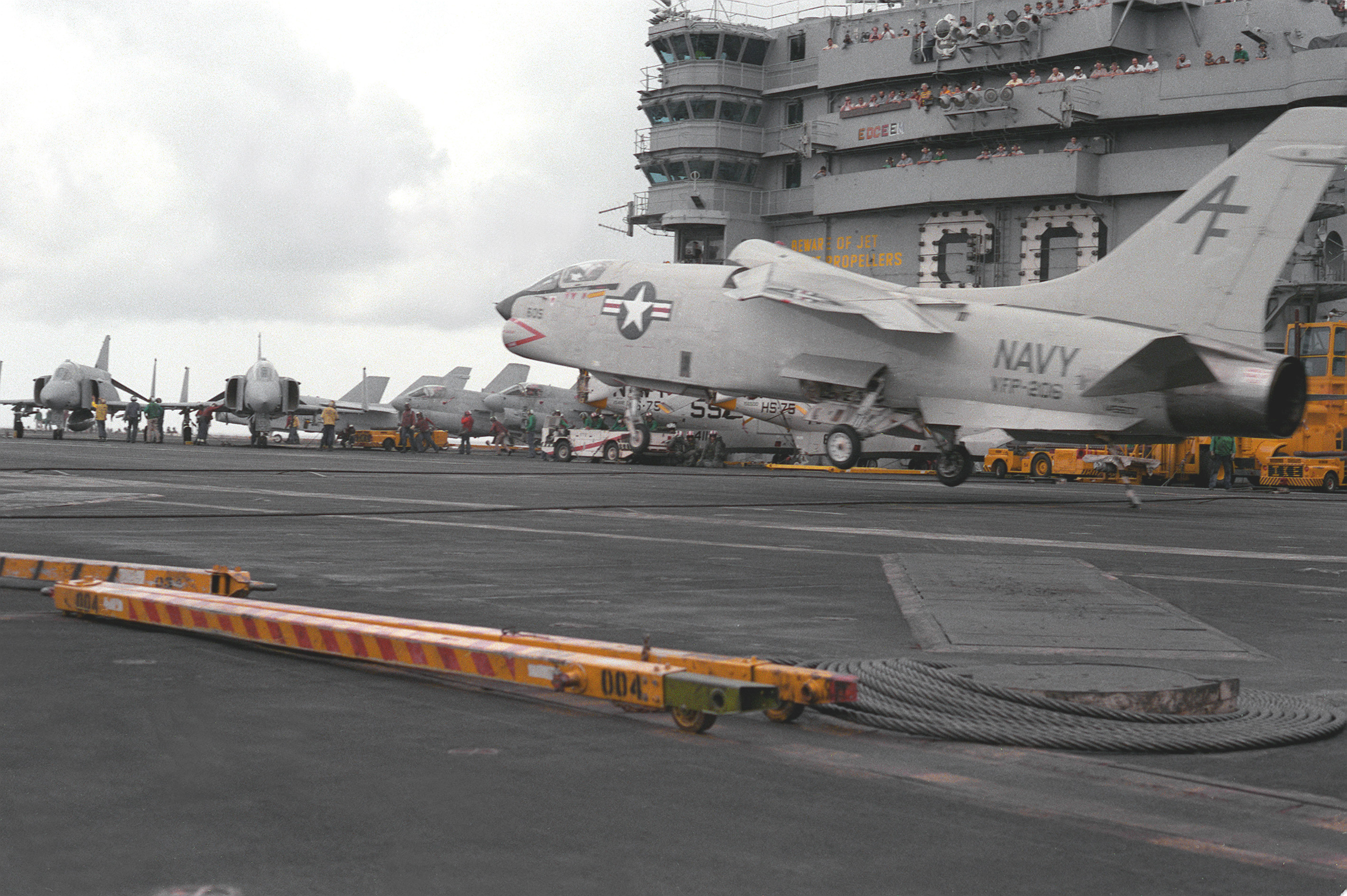
VFP-206 RF-8G Crusader lands on USS Dwight D. Eisenhower in 1985

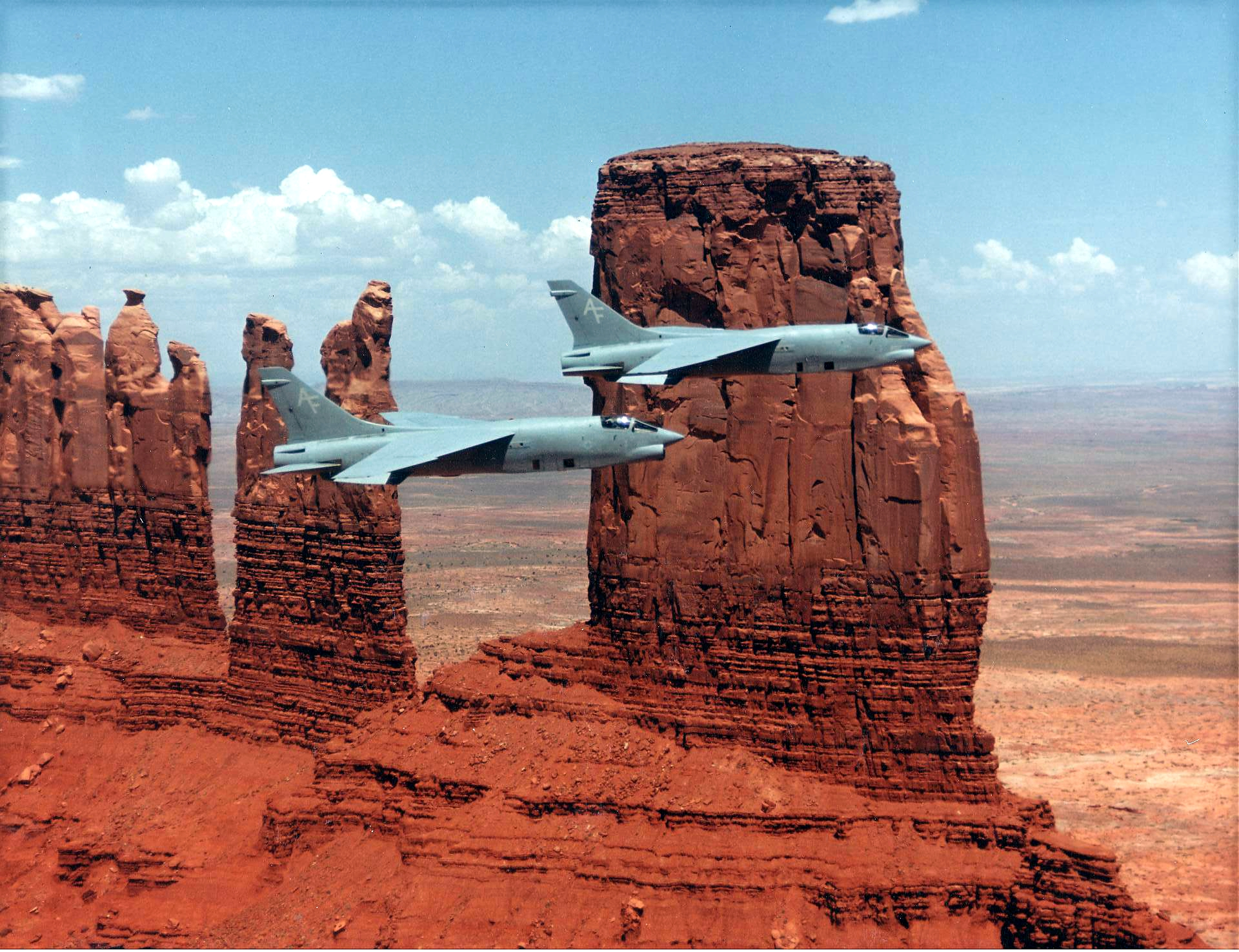
VFP-206 RF-8Gs over Monument Valley in 1985

=== 1970's to Disestablishment ===
VFP-206 would be the last US Navy unit to operate the F-8 Crusader and was the last specialized photographic reconnaissance aircraft in Navy service. The last operational RF-8G #146860, was donated to the Smithsonian Institution on 30 March 1987, the day after VFP-206 was disestablished, it is now on display at the Steven F. Udvar-Hazy Center.

== Home port assignments ==
NAF Washington

== Aircraft assignment ==
- RF-8G Crusader

== See also ==
- Reconnaissance aircraft
- List of inactive United States Navy aircraft squadrons
- History of the United States Navy
