= General Lucius D. Clay National Guard Center =

- Marietta, Georgia in the United States
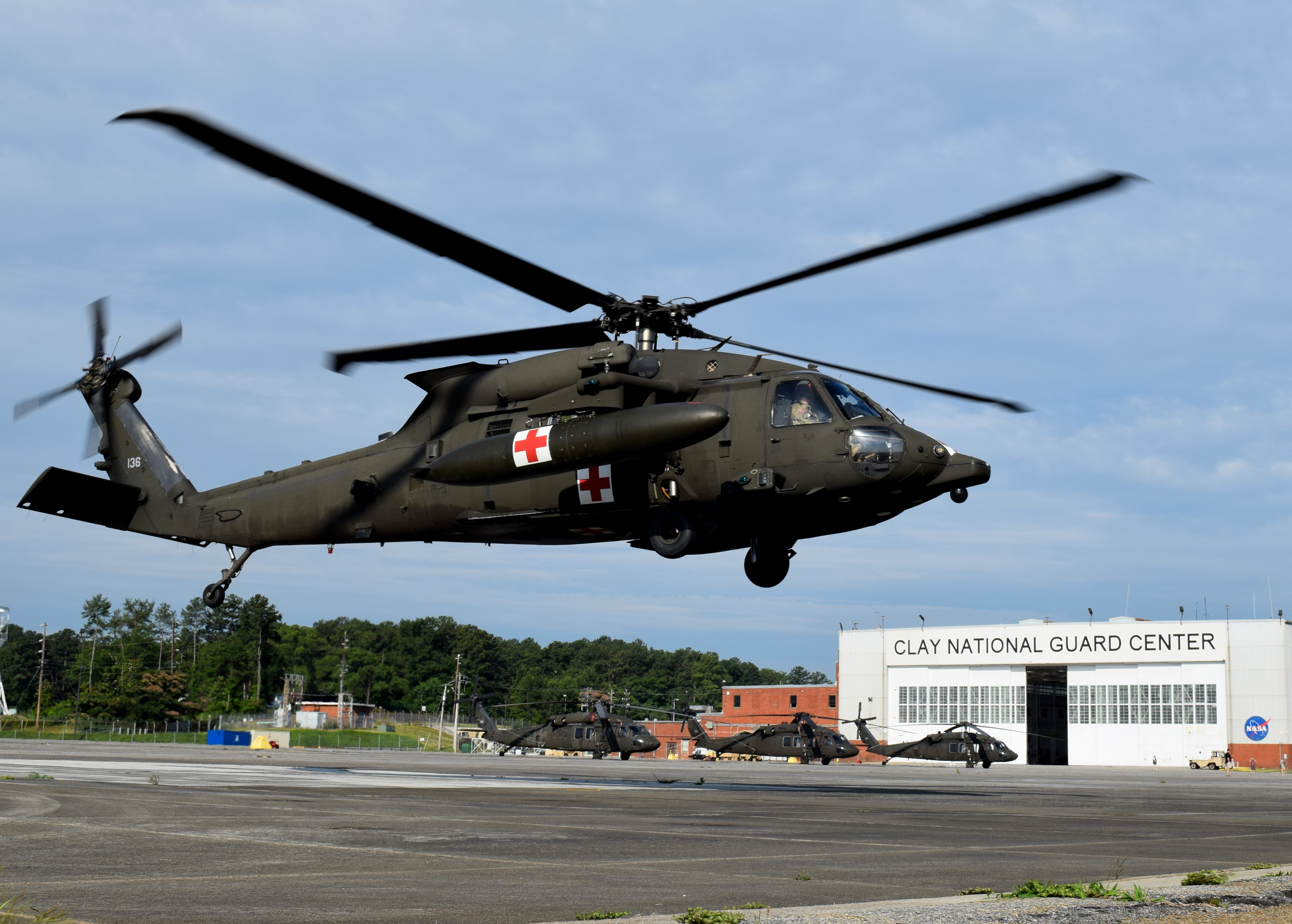
- An HH-60M Black Hawk of the Georgia National Guard's 1st Battalion, 111th Aviation Regiment lifts off from Clay National Guard Center.

Site information
- Type: National guard center
- Owner: Georgia Department of Defense
- Operator: Georgia Army National Guard
- Condition: Operational

Location
- Location in the United States
- Coordinates: 33°54′55″N 084°30′59″W

Site history
- Built: 1958
- In use: 1958 – 2009 (US Navy); 2009 – present (National Guard)

Airfield information
- Identifiers: IATA: MGE, ICAO: KMGE, FAA LID: MGE, WMO: 722270
- Elevation: 325.5 metres (1,068 ft) AMSL
Runways
Direction	Length and surface
11/29	3,048.6 metres (10,002 ft) Concrete
110/290	1,065.2 metres (3,495 ft) Asphalt
- Airfield shared with Dobbins Air Reserve Base; Source: Federal Aviation Administration

General Lucius D. Clay National Guard Center (formerly Naval Air Station Atlanta) is a military facility located 1-mile (1.6 km) south of Marietta, Georgia, United States. It is located immediately south of Dobbins Air Reserve Base, in unincorporated Cobb County, and shares its runways.

Before 1959, Naval Air Station Atlanta was located at what is now DeKalb–Peachtree Airport, located northeast of Atlanta in DeKalb County. It operated until 26 September 2009 when the base closed its doors. The property is now owned by the state of Georgia as the new headquarters for the Georgia State Department of Defense. The Navy's website for NAS Atlanta was deleted soon after the transfer.

== History ==
In April 1955, Congress appropriated more than $4 million to start building a new Naval Air Station at a more suitable location to allow longer runways. The site selected was a large military reservation jointly occupied by Dobbins Air Force Base and the Lockheed Company, between Marietta and Smyrna. The new air station was completed in April 1959.

Naval Air Station Atlanta was originally located at what is now DeKalb–Peachtree Airport in Chamblee, until it moved in 1958. The Southern Technical Institute took over the barracks there, and it too moved in 1958 to Marietta, just on the other side of Dobbins AFB.

Naval Air Station Atlanta's mission was to train Navy and Marine Corps Reservists assigned to numerous aviation and non-aviation reserve units. The command organization was made of more than 900 active duty military and civilian personnel. NAS Atlanta was the home of Marine Aircraft Group 42, Carrier Air Wing Reserve Twenty, three Navy squadrons (flying the F/A-18, E-2 and C-9 aircraft), two Marine Corps squadrons (flying the F/A-18 aircraft, and AH-1W and UH-1 helicopters) as well as several other commands. In 2005, the Department of Defense recommended that NAS Atlanta be closed and the units there relocated elsewhere.

NAS Atlanta offered superb convenience and thus recruiting opportunities to the services’ reserve components, at some cost in operational flexibility. Airspace access was difficult: the F/A-18s assigned to VFA-203 and VMFA-142 faced one of the more difficult United States Navy Reserve airspace access challenges. Operations at the Atlanta Hartsfield Airport impose a significant impact on surrounding airspace. Atlanta functions as a 360 degree hub, with approach, departure, bypass or overflight traffic using virtually all available airspace within 200 miles (320 km) of the facility. The airspace northeast of Atlanta is probably the most congested, as it must accommodate departures and arrivals between Atlanta and cities in the northeast. Unfortunately, the primary airspace available to NAF Atlanta units, the Snowbird MOA/ATCAA lay in that quadrant.

The Air Station was proudly awarded the Edwin F. Conway Trophy in 1987, 1993 for being the most efficient Naval Air Station in the Naval Reserve, and the Aircraft Intermediate Maintenance Department (AIMD) won the Commander, Naval Reserve Force Robert S. Gray Maintenance Excellence Award in 1987 and 1992. In 1990 the air station was awarded the Meritorious Unit Commendation for unprecedented accomplishments, consistent performance and unswerving dedication to duty. Other awards between 1988 and 1993 include: Secretary of Navy Energy Conservation Award; major claimant nominations for the Bronze Hammer Award, nomination for the Commander in Chief's Installation Excellence Award, and the 1992 Commander, Naval Air Reserve Force Safety Ashore Award.

NAS Atlanta was also the site of the Navy Lake Site, a military recreation area open to active, reserve, and retired military, located in a 25-acre (100,000 m^{2}) park on Lake Allatoona reservoir. Not to be outdone, the Army has its own Lake Allatoona Army Recreation Area, an 85-acre (340,000 m^{2}) resort on another part of the same lake at nearby Ft. McPherson.

NAS Atlanta closed its doors on 26 September 2009 in a base closing ceremony. The property was then turned over to the Georgia State Department of Defense for use as its new main base of operations.

== Present day ==
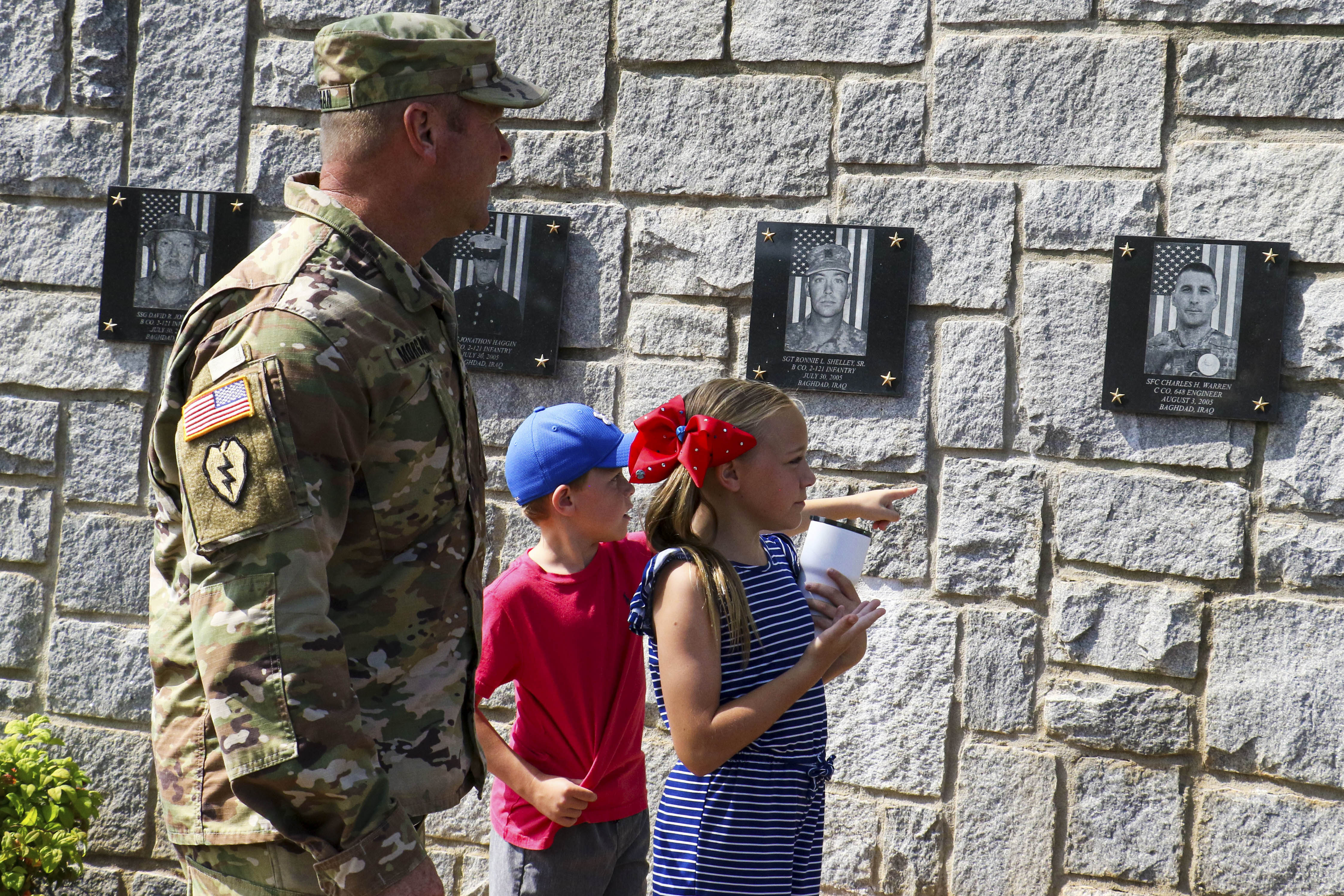
A soldier and children visiting a memorial at the Clay Center in 2019

In 2007, the state of Georgia announced that it had acquired the NAS Atlanta property as the new headquarters for the Georgia Army National Guard. This preceded plans for units in the remote corners of the state to consolidate at the base.

The first Georgia Army National Guard aircraft assigned to the new installation, a HH-60M Blackhawk, arrived on 25 August 2009. It was delivered to the 1/111 Medevac Unit fresh from the production line.

On 26 September 2009, the Georgia National Guard assumed ownership of the former Naval Air Station Atlanta at a formal transfer of facilities ceremony. The transfer was the result of the 2005 Defense Base Closure and Realignment Commission report which recommended closing the 50-year-old Marietta base. Captain Chuck Mingonet officially turned over the base to General Nesbitt, Adjutant General of the Georgia State Department of Defense. Commander, Navy Region Southeast, Rear Admiral Tim Alexander was in attendance along with many other flag officers and dignitaries. Governor Sonny Perdue, members of Georgia's Congressional delegation and state legislature, as well as local dignitaries including Chairman Sam Olens and Commissioner Bob Ott, were on hand for the event. The facility's name was also changed to the General Lucius D. Clay National Guard Center in honor of the World War II hero and coordinator of the Berlin Airlift. Clay was a Cobb County native. Following the ceremony, Georgia National Guard also held a groundbreaking for its new Joint Force Headquarters. The headquarters was scheduled for completion in 2012. More than 1,500 Georgia Guard soldiers and airmen will perform training on the property in the future.

== Tenant aviation units ==
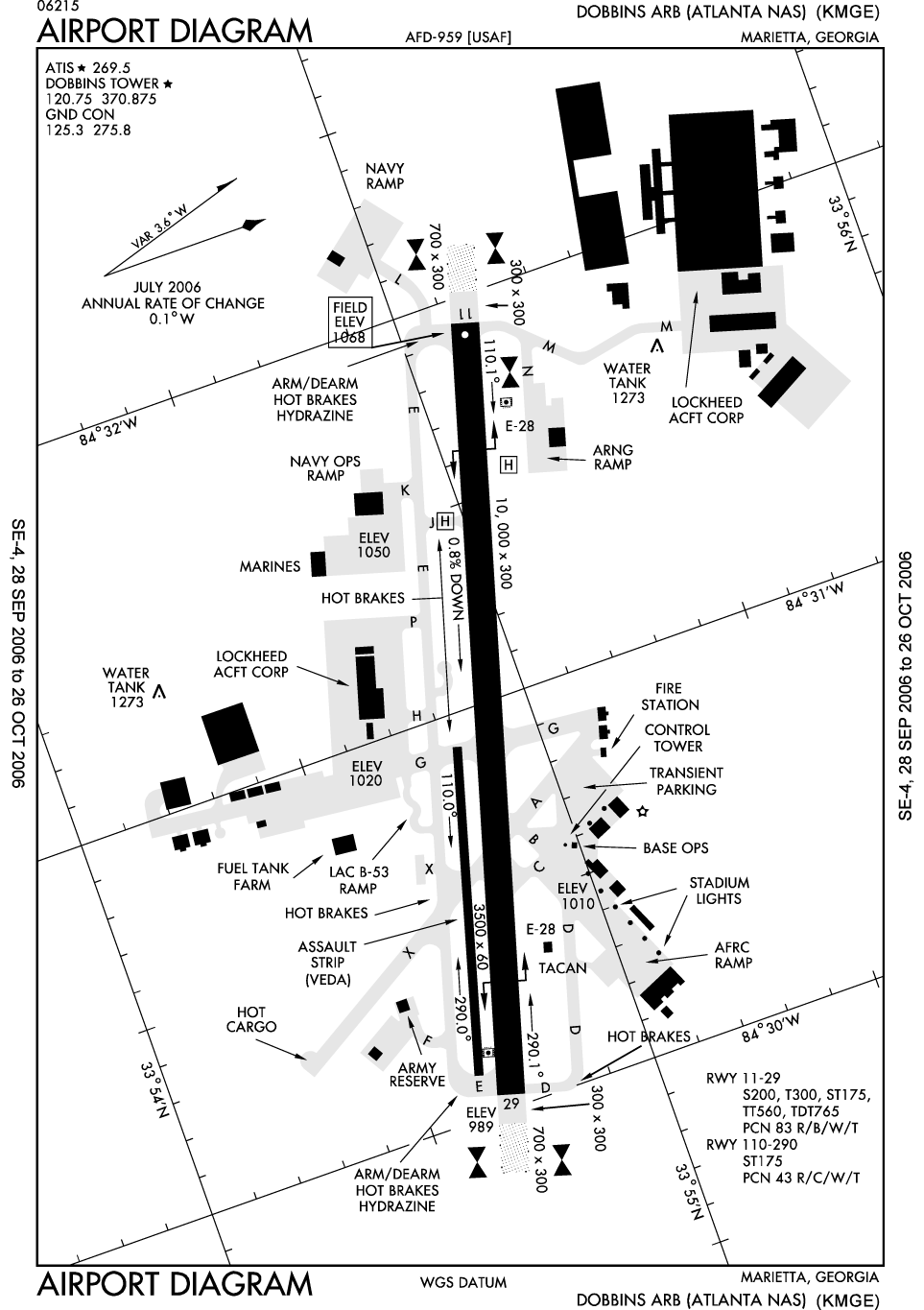
FAA airport diagram

- 78th Aviation Troop Command (Georgia Army National Guard)
- Army Aviation Support Facility #2 (GA ARNG)
  - 1st Battalion, 171st Aviation Regiment
    - Detachment of Headquarters and Headquarters Company (GA ARNG)
    - Company A (GA ARNG)
    - Detachment of Company D (GA ARNG)
    - Detachment of Company E (GA ARNG)
  - 2nd Battalion, 151st Aviation Regiment
    - Detachment of Company C (GA ARNG)
  - 1st Battalion, 111th Aviation Regiment
    - Detachment of Headquarters and Headquarters Company (GA ARNG)
    - Detachment of Company C (GA ARNG)
    - Detachment of Company D (GA ARNG)
    - Detachment of Company E (GA ARNG)
  - Detachment 9 of Joint Operational Support Airlift Center (JOSAC), State Flight Detachment (GA ARNG)
