= VAH-16 =

Heavy Attack Squadron 16
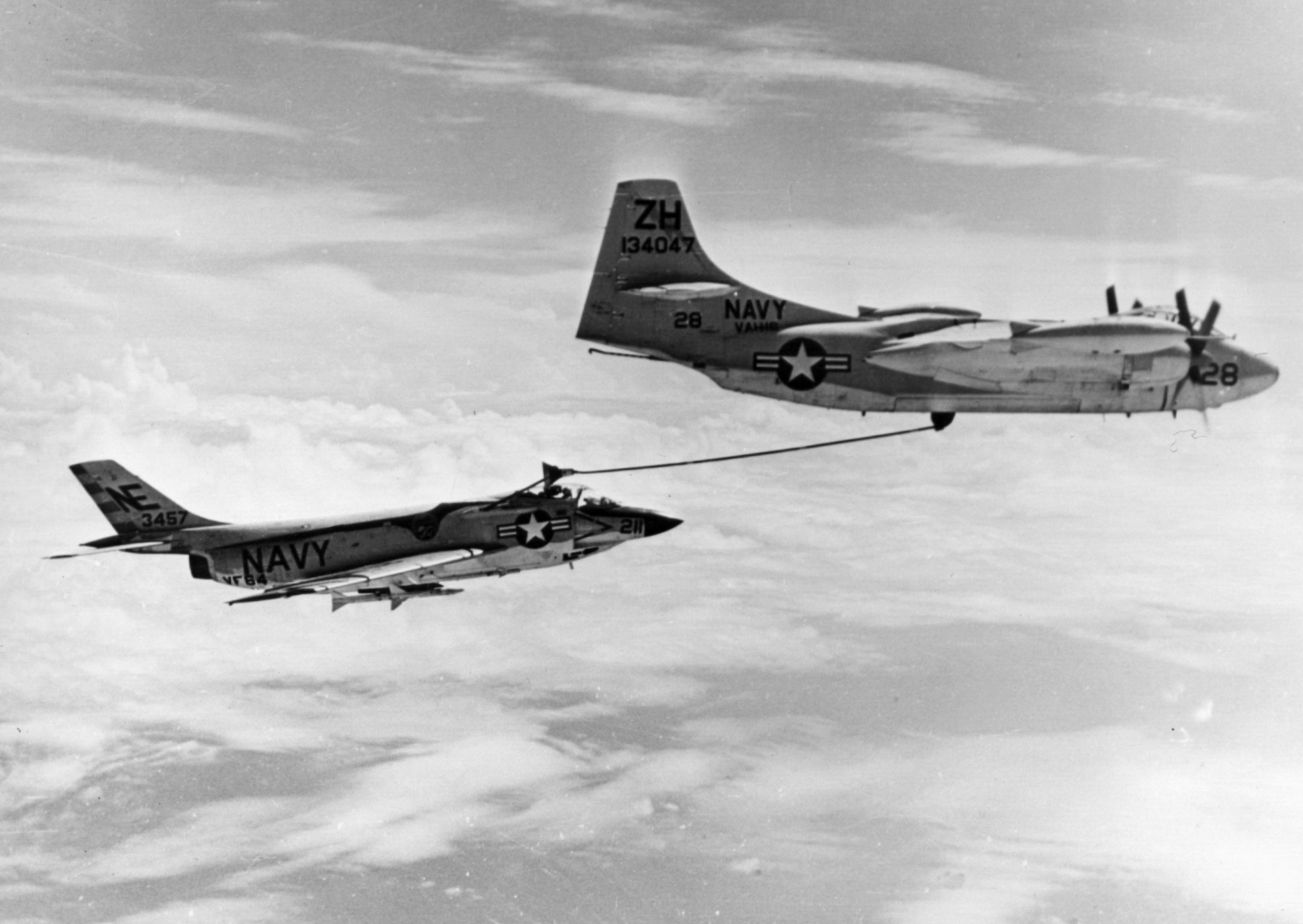
- VAH-16 AJ-2 refuels a VF-61 F3H-2 in 1958
- Active: 15 January 1958 – 30 January 1959
- Country: United States
- Branch: United States Navy
- Role: aerial refueling
- Part of: Inactive
- Nickname(s): White Blades

Aircraft flown
- Attack: AJ-2 Savage

VAH-16, nicknamed the White Blades, was a short-lived Heavy Attack Squadron of the United States Navy, based at NAS North Island, California. The squadron flew the North American AJ Savage aircraft.

The squadron was established on 15 January 1958. On 13 Jun it established Detachment A in Hawaii and then relocated it to NAS Agana, Guam, with four AJ-2 aircraft. On 1 Jul 1958, its primary mission of heavy attack high altitude bombing was changed to that of aerial refueling. The squadron was disestablished on 30 January 1959.

== See also ==
- History of the United States Navy
- List of inactive United States Navy aircraft squadrons
