= RVAH-6 =

Reconnaissance Attack (Heavy) Squadron 6
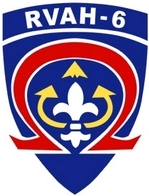
- RVAH-6 squadron patch
- Active: 6 January 1950-20 October 1978
- Country: United States
- Branch: United States Navy
- Role: Photo-reconnaissance
- Part of: Inactive
- Nickname(s): Fleurs
- Engagements: Vietnam War

RVAH-6 was a Reconnaissance Attack (Heavy) Squadron of the U.S. Navy. Originally established as Composite Squadron Six (VC-6) on 6 January 1950, it was redesignated as Heavy Attack Squadron Six (VAH-6) on 1 July 1956 and was redesignated as Reconnaissance Attack (Heavy) Squadron Six (RVAH-6) on 23 September 1965. The squadron was disestablished on 20 October 1978.

== Operational history ==
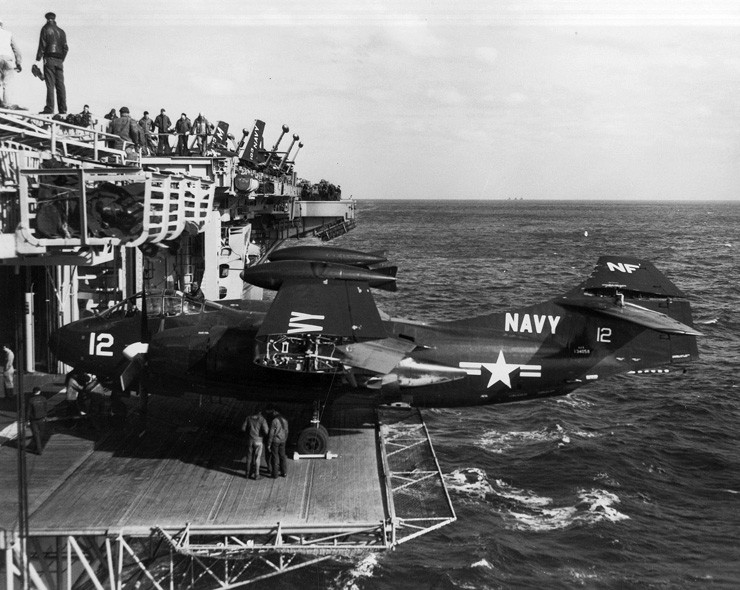
VC-6 AJ-2 Savage on board USS Midway in 1954

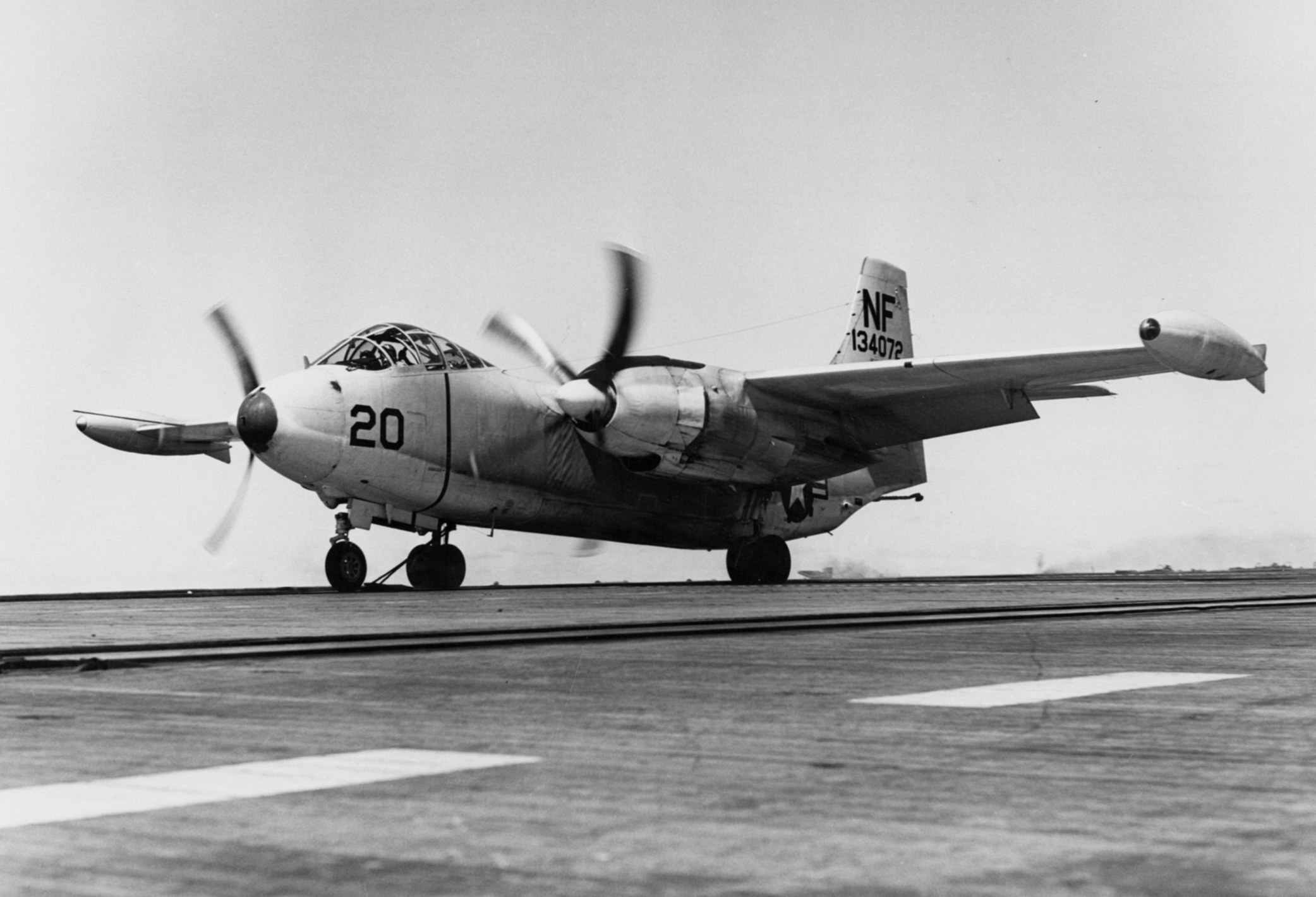
VAH-6 AJ-2 Savage preparing to launch from USS Lexington in 1956

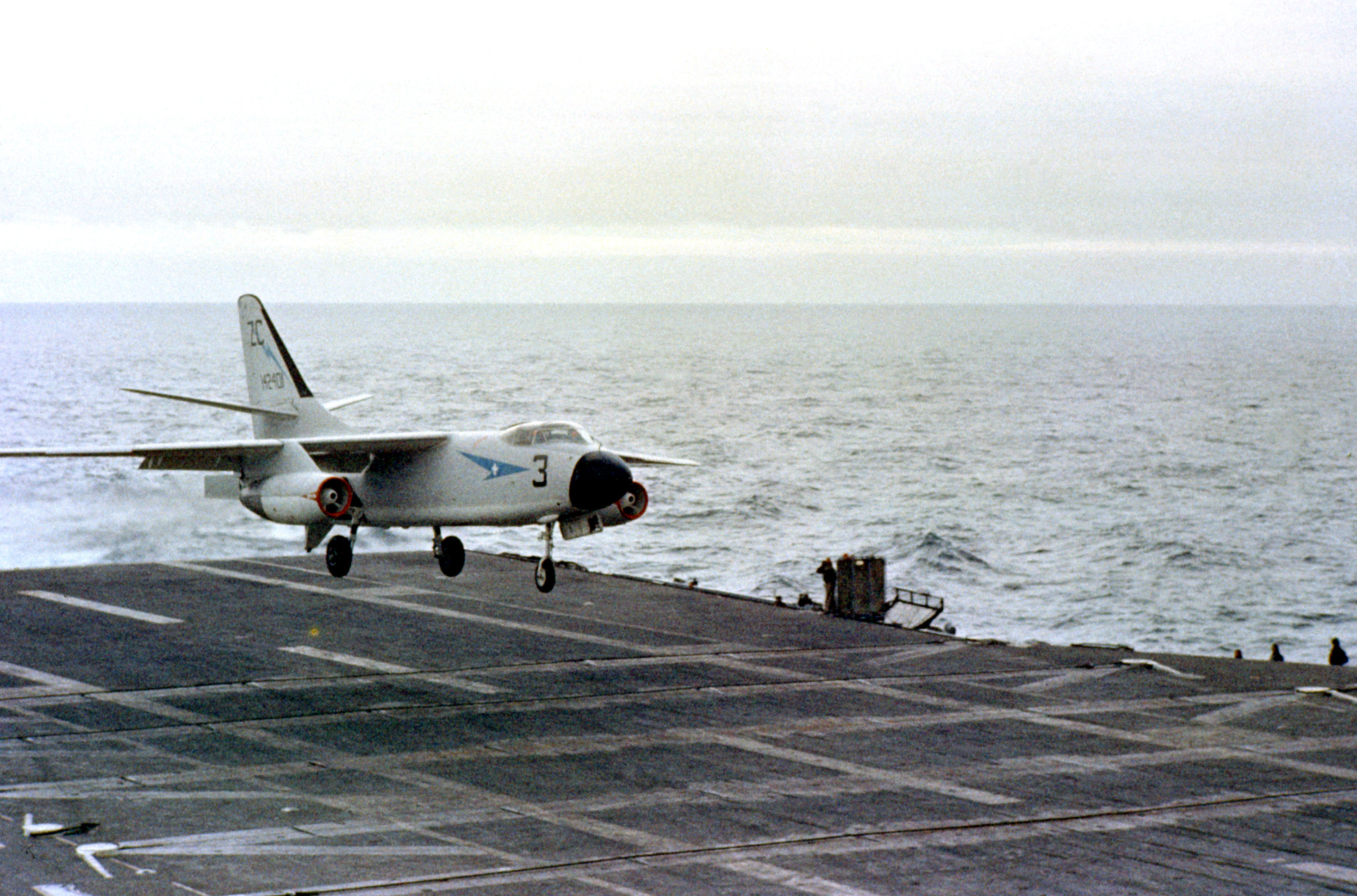
VAH-6 A3D-2 Skywarrior lands on USS Ranger in 1958

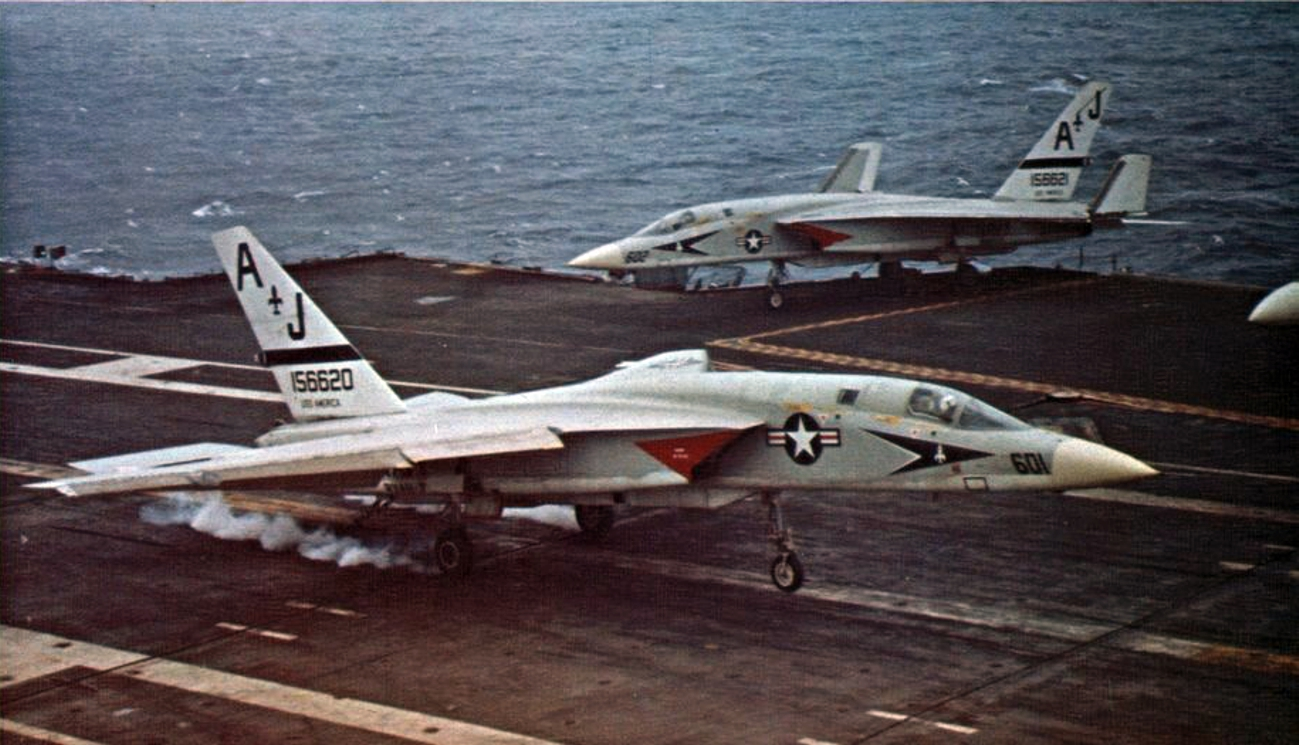
RVAH-6 RA-5C Vigilante lands on USS America c.1972

=== VC-6 ===
VC-6 was established at Naval Air Station Moffett Field, California on 6 January 1950 as the Navy's second nuclear attack squadron and was initially equipped with the P2V Neptune. It became the second Navy squadron to operate the AJ-2 Savage, receiving its first aircraft in late 1950. In June 1952, the squadron relocated to Naval Air Station North Island, California and was redesignated Heavy Attack Squadron SIX (VAH-6) on 1 July 1956.

=== VAH-6 ===
VAH-6 remained at NAS North Island until relocating to Naval Air Station Whidbey Island, Washington in early 1958. In June 1958, VAH-6 reequipped with the Douglas A3D-2 Skywarrior and made several Western Pacific (WESTPAC) deployments aboard USS Ranger and Mediterranean deployments aboard USS Forrestal. The squadron's A3D-2 aircraft were redesignated as the A-3B Skywarrior in September 1962.

In 1965, the squadron relocated to Naval Air Station Sanford, Florida. In September 1965, the squadron completed transition to the RA-5C Vigilante and was redesignated as Reconnaissance Attack Squadron SIX (RVAH-6).

=== RVAH-6 / Vietnam ===
- 12 May - 3 December 1966, RVAH-6 was embarked on USS Constellation for a WESTPAC and Vietnam deployment.
  - On 19 August 1966, RA-5C BuNo 149309 was lost in combat while flying from USS Constellation; both crewmen ejected successfully and were rescued.
  - On 23 October 1966, while operating from USS Constellation, RA-5C BuNo 150830 was lost in combat over North Vietnam. The remains of the crew, Lieutenant Commander Thomas Kolstad and Lieutenant (junior grade) William Klenert, were returned to the United States in March 1977. Kolstad was posthumously promoted to CDR and Klenert was posthumously promoted to LT and LCDR.
- 4 November 1967 – 25 May 1968, RVAH-6 was embarked on USS Ranger for a WESTPAC and Vietnam deployment.
  - Budgetary pressures of the Vietnam War force the Department of Defense to close several stateside air bases, to include Naval Air Station Sanford. Upon return from their 1967-1968 deployment, RVAH-1 shifts home stations from NAS Sanford to the former Turner Air Force Base, renamed Naval Air Station Albany, Georgia.
- 6 January-2 July 1969, RVAH-6 was embarked on USS Enterprise for a WESTPAC and Vietnam deployment.
  - On 31 March 1969, RA-5C BuNo 150842 was lost in combat over Laos with the RVAH-6 Commanding Officer, Commander Danforth White, as the pilot and Lieutenant Ramey Carpenter as the reconnaissance attack navigator. The aircraft burst into flames and broke up in flight; there were no ejections and both crewmen were killed in action.
- 6 November 1970 – 17 July 1971, RVAH-6 was embarked on USS Kitty Hawk for a WESTPAC and Vietnam deployment.
- 5 June 1972 – 24 March 1973, RVAH-6 was embarked on USS America for a WESTPAC and Vietnam deployment.

=== RVAH-6 / Cold War ===
- 11 March 1974 - 11 September 1974, RVAH-6 was embarked on USS Forrestal for an Atlantic/Mediterranean deployment.
  - Budgetary pressures following the end of the Vietnam War force the Department of Defense to again close several stateside air bases, to include Naval Air Station Albany. Following completion of their 1974 deployment, RVAH-6 shifts home stations from NAS Albany to Naval Air Station Key West, Florida.
- 21 May 1975 - 15 December 1975, RVAH-6 was embarked on USS Kitty Hawk for a WESTPAC deployment.
- 1 December 1977 - 20 July 1978, RVAH-6 was embarked on USS Nimitz for an Atlantic/Mediterranean deployment.

Attrition of airframes and the increasing maintenance and flight hour costs of the RA-5C in a constrained post-Vietnam defense budget environment forced the Navy to incrementally retire the RA-5C and sunset the RVAH community beginning in mid-1974 as the RVAH community began relocating from the inactivating NAS Albany to NAS Key West. Carrier-based reconnaissance was concurrently conducted by the active duty VFP community at Naval Air Station Miramar and the Naval Reserve VFP community at Andrews Air Force Base / NAF Washington with the RF-8G Crusader until 29 March 1987, when the last RF-8G is retired and the mission was fully transferred to the active duty and Naval Reserve VF community at NAS Miramar, Naval Air Station Oceana, Naval Air Station Dallas and NAS JRB Fort Worth as a secondary role with the F-14 Tomcat equipped with the Tactical Air Reconnaissance Pod System (TARPS).

Following its return from its final Atlantic/Mediterranean deployment in July 1978, RVAH-6 was inactivated at Naval Air Station Key West on 20 October 1978 following over 28 years of active service. One of RVAH-6's aircraft from its final deployment aboard Nimitz, BuNo 156624, was flown to Naval Air Station Pensacola, Florida as a permanent addition to the collection of the National Naval Aviation Museum.

== Home station assignments ==
The squadron was assigned to these home stations:

- Naval Air Station Moffett Field, California
- Naval Air Station North Island, California
- Naval Air Station Whidbey Island, Washington
- Naval Air Station Sanford, Florida
- Naval Air Station Albany, Georgia
- Naval Air Station Key West, Florida

== Aircraft Assigned ==
- P2V-3B/C Neptune
- AJ-2 Savage
- A3D-2 / A-3B Skywarrior
- RA-5C Vigilante

== See also ==
- Reconnaissance aircraft
- List of inactive United States Navy aircraft squadrons
- History of the United States Navy
