= VAH-15 =

Heavy Attack Squadron 15
- Active: 15 January 1958 – 15 February 1959
- Country: United States
- Branch: United States Navy
- Role: aerial refueling
- Part of: Inactive

Aircraft flown
- Attack: AJ Savage; TV-2 Seastar

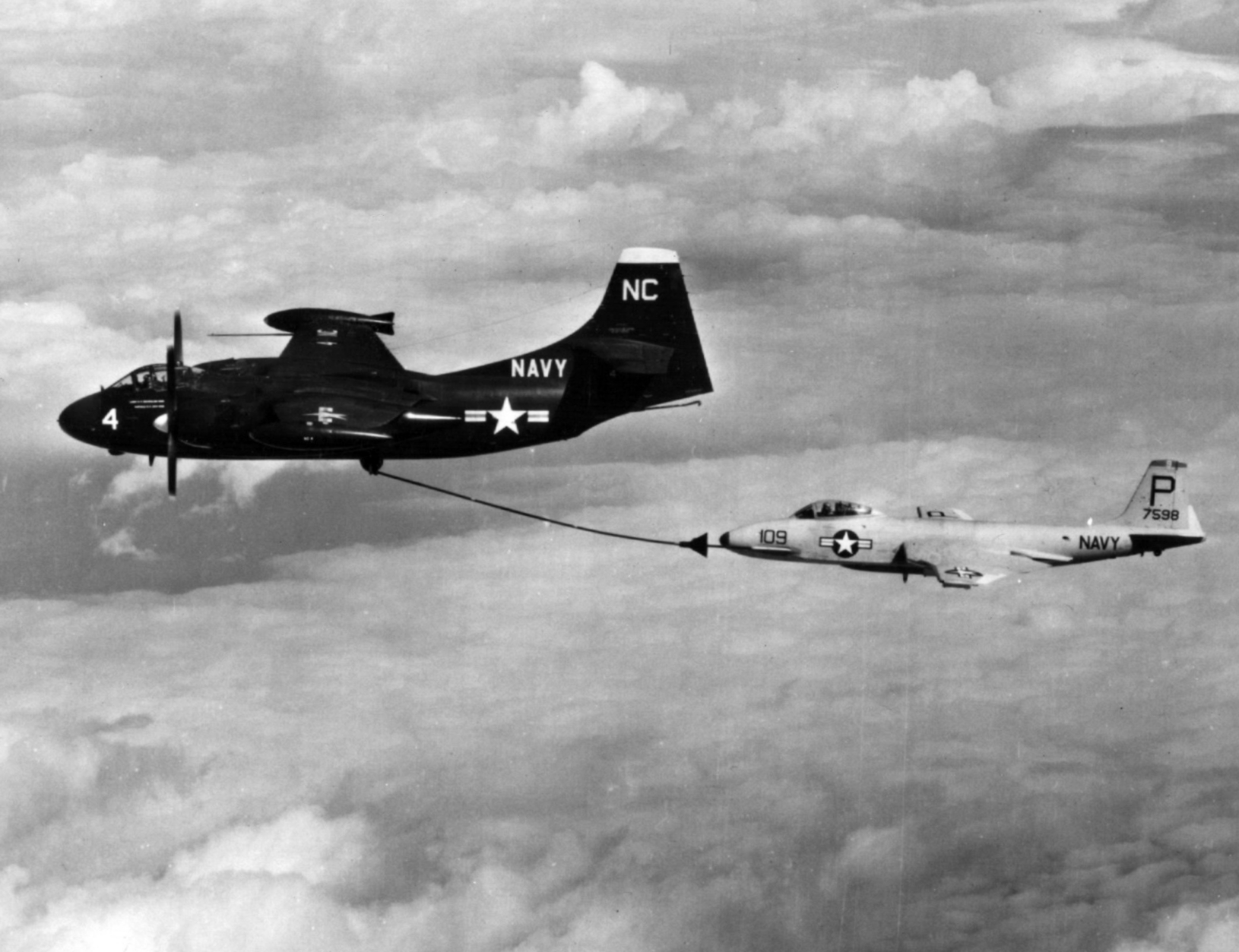
An AJ-2 refueling an F2H-4 in 1958

VAH-15 was a short-lived Heavy Attack Squadron of the United States Navy, based at NAS Norfolk, Virginia. The squadron flew the North American AJ Savage and Lockheed TV-2 Seastar aircraft.

The squadron was established on 15 January 1958 with the designation heavy attack but its primary mission was to provide aerial refueling to the Naval Air Force, Atlantic Fleet. It was disestablished a little more than one year later, on 15 February 1959.

== See also ==
- History of the United States Navy
- List of inactive United States Navy aircraft squadrons
