= RVAH-5 =

Reconnaissance Attack (Heavy) Squadron 5
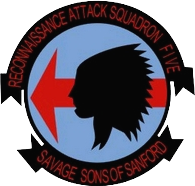
- RVAH-5 squadron patch
- Active: 9 September 1948 – 30 September 1977
- Country: United States
- Branch: United States Navy
- Role: Photo-reconnaissance
- Part of: Inactive
- Nickname: Savage Sons
- Engagements: Vietnam War

RVAH-5 was a Reconnaissance Attack (Heavy) Squadron of the U.S. Navy. Originally established as Composite Squadron Five (VC-5) at Naval Air Station Moffett Field, California on 9 September 1948, it was redesignated as Heavy Attack Squadron Five (VAH-5) on 1 November 1955 and was later redesignated as Reconnaissance Attack (Heavy) Squadron Five (RVAH-5) in May 1964. The squadron was disestablished on 30 September 1977.

== Operational history ==
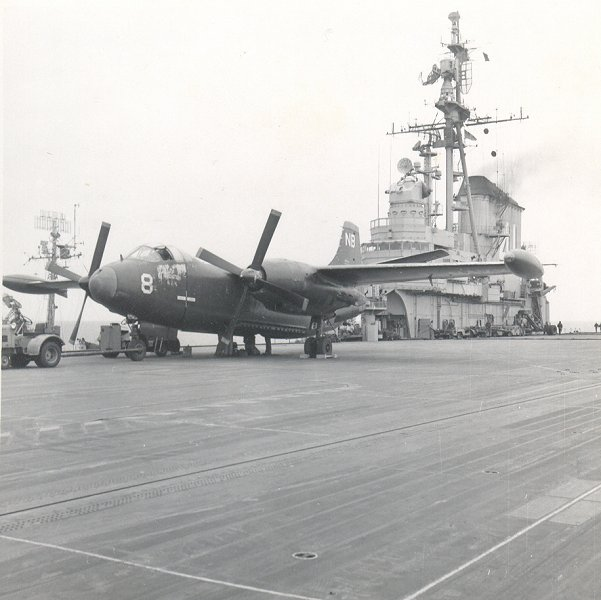
VC-5 AJ-2 Savage on board USS Midway circa 1953

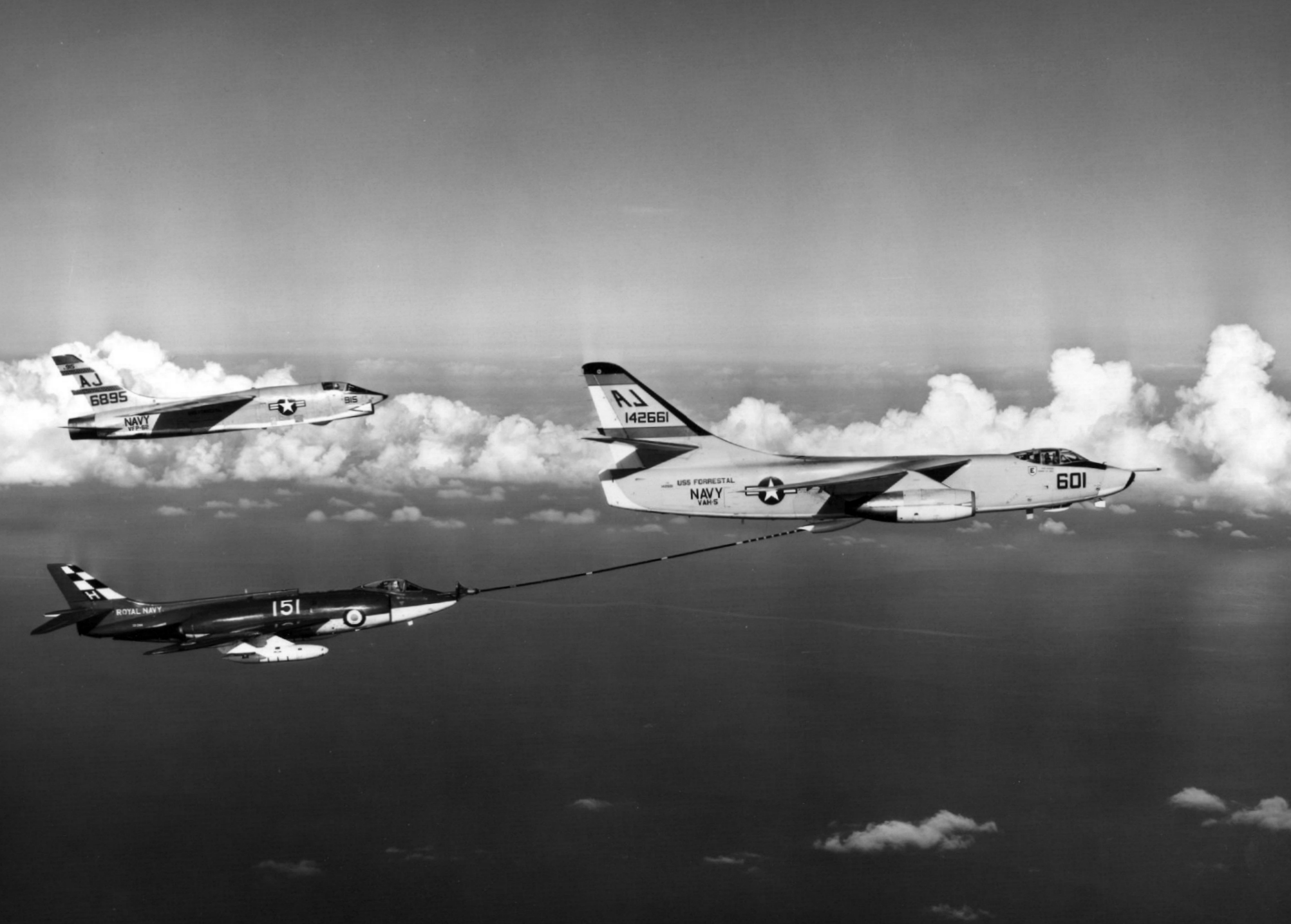
VAH-5 A-3B Skywarrior refuels a Royal Navy Supermarine Scimitar circa 1962

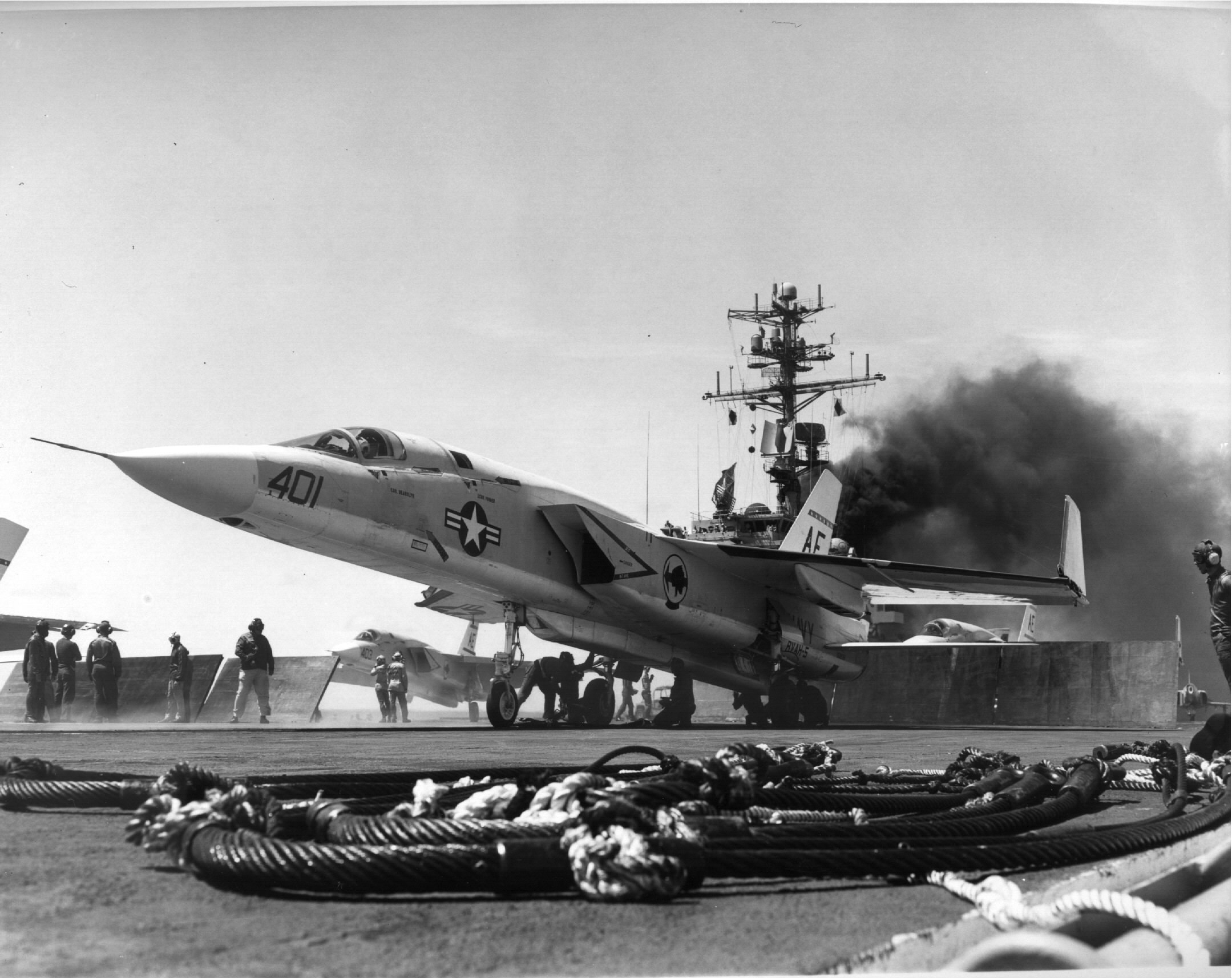
RVAH-5 RA-5C Vigilante prepares to launch from USS America c 1966

=== VC-5 ===
VC-5 was first equipped with the P2V-3C Neptune before transitioning to the AJ-1 Savage and, in the spring of 1950 the AJ-2 Savage. In late 1950, the squadron changed home stations to Naval Air Station Norfolk, Virginia, followed by subsequent moves to Naval Air Station Jacksonville, Florida in 1952 and Naval Air Auxiliary Station Sanford, Florida in 1955. In 1955, the squadron transitioned from the AJ-1 to the AJ-2 Savage and was subsequently redesignated as Heavy Attack Squadron Five (VAH-5) on 1 November 1955.

=== VAH-5 ===
VAH-5 reequipped with the A3D-2 Skywarrior in late 1957, having had to wait 18 months to receive their first Skywarriors as improvements were made to Naval Air Auxiliary Station Sanford, upgrading it to full naval air station status as a Master Jet Base and renaming it as Naval Air Station Sanford. VAH-5 subsequently made four Atlantic/Mediterranean (LANT/MED) carrier deployments with the Skywarrior:

- 2 September 1958 – 12 March 1959, USS Forrestal, Mediterranean
- 28 January 1960 – 31 August 1960, USS Forrestal, Mediterranean
- 9 February 1961 – 25 August 1961, USS Forrestal, Mediterranean
  - 12 October 1961, while on at home turnaround cycle at Naval Air Station Sanford, an A3D-2, Bureau Number (BuNo) 142663, assigned to VAH-5 crashed near NAS Sanford following a mid-air collision with another A3D-2, BuNo 142648, assigned to VAH-11. The VAH-11 aircraft's radome and canopy collided with the VAH-5 aircraft's starboard side while both aircraft were on an approach to land at NAS Sanford. All eight crewmen, four in the VAH-5 aircraft and four in the VAH-11 aircraft, were killed.
- 3 August 1962 – 2 March 1963, USS Forrestal, Mediterranean
  - In September 1962, with implementation of a new DoD-wide aircraft designation system, the squadron's A3D-2 aircraft were redesignated as the A-3B.

In March 1963, following return from deployment, VAH-5 began transitioning to the RA-5C Vigilante. Upon completion of this transition, the squadron was redesignated as Reconnaissance Attack Squadron FIVE (RVAH-5) in May 1964.

=== RVAH-5 / Vietnam / Cold War ===
During the Vietnam War, RVAH-5 completed five combined Western Pacific (WESTPAC) and Vietnam deployments, and two Atlantic / Mediterranean (LANT/MED) deployments on the following carriers:

- 5 August 1964 – 6 May 1965, USS Ranger, WESTPAC and Vietnam
- 30 November 1965 – 10 July 1966, USS America, LANT/MED
- 10 January - 20 September 1967, USS America, LANT/MED
- 29 May 1968 – 31 January 1969 USS Constellation, WESTPAC and Vietnam
  - On 25 November 1968, RA-5C BuNo 149293 was lost in combat. The pilot, CDR Ernest Stamm, ejected successfully, was captured, but died in captivity on 16 January 1969 as a POW in North Vietnam; he was posthumously promoted to captain and his remains were returned to the United States in March 1974. The navigator, Lieutenant (junior grade) Richard Thum was killed during the shootdown and his remains were returned to the United States in September 1977.
  - Budgetary pressures of the Vietnam War forced the Department of Defense to close several stateside air bases, to include Naval Air Station Sanford. Upon return from their 1968-1969 deployment, RVAH-5 shifts home stations from NAS Sanford to the former Turner Air Force Base, renamed Naval Air Station Albany, Georgia.
- 14 October 1969 – 1 June 1970, USS Ranger, WESTPAC and Vietnam
- 11 June 1971 – 12 February 1972, USS Enterprise, WESTPAC and Vietnam
- 16 November 1972 – 23 June 1973, USS Ranger, WESTPAC and Vietnam

=== RVAH-5 / Cold War ===
- 21 June 1974 – 23 December 1974, RVAH-5 was embarked on USS Constellation for a WESTPAC deployment.
  - Budgetary pressures following the end of the Vietnam War force the Department of Defense to again close several stateside air bases, to include Naval Air Station Albany, Georgia. Following completion of its 1974 deployment, RVAH-5 shifts home stations from NAS Albany to Naval Air Station Key West, Florida.
- 30 January 1976 – 7 September 1976, RVAH-5 was embarked aboard USS Ranger for a WESTPAC/Indian Ocean deployment.

Attrition of airframes and the increasing maintenance and flight hour costs of the RA-5C in a constrained defense budget environment forced the Navy to incrementally retire the RA-5C and sunset the RVAH community beginning in mid-1974. Carrier-based reconnaissance was concurrently conducted by the active duty VFP community at Naval Air Station Miramar and the Naval Reserve VFP community at Andrews Air Force Base / NAF Washington with the RF-8G Crusader until 29 March 1987, when the last RF-8G was retired and the fast reconnaissance mission was fully transferred to the active duty and Naval Reserve VF community at Naval Air Station Miramar, Naval Air Station Oceana, Naval Air Station Dallas and NAS JRB Fort Worth as a secondary role with the F-14 Tomcat equipped with the Tactical Air Reconnaissance Pod System (TARPS).

Following its return from its final Western Pacific deployment in September 1976, RVAH-5 commenced the inactivation process and was finally inactivated at Naval Air Station Key West on 30 September 1977 following over 29 years of active service.

== Home station assignments ==
The squadron was assigned to these home stations:

- Naval Air Station Moffett Field, California
- Naval Air Station Norfolk, Virginia
- Naval Air Station Jacksonville, Florida
- Naval Air Auxiliary Station Sanford / Naval Air Station Sanford, Florida
- Naval Air Station Albany, Georgia
- Naval Air Station Key West, Florida

== Aircraft Assigned ==
- P2V-3C Neptune
- AJ-1 / AJ-2 Savage
- A3D-2 / A-3B Skywarrior
- RA-5C Vigilante

== See also ==
- Reconnaissance aircraft
- List of inactive United States Navy aircraft squadrons
- History of the United States Navy
