= RVAH-11 =

Reconnaissance Attack (Heavy) Squadron 11
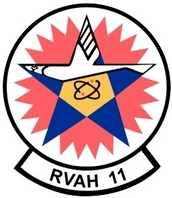
- RVAH-11 squadron patch
- Active: 3 December 1951 – 1 June 1975
- Country: United States
- Branch: United States Navy
- Role: Photo-reconnaissance
- Part of: Inactive
- Nickname(s): Checkertails
- Engagements: Vietnam War

RVAH-11 was a Reconnaissance Attack (Heavy) Squadron of the U.S. Navy. Originally established as Composite Squadron Eight (VC-8) on 3 December 1951, it was redesignated Heavy Attack Squadron Eleven (VAH-11) on 1 November 1955 and was redesignated as Reconnaissance Attack (Heavy) Squadron Eleven (RVAH-11) on 1 July 1966. The squadron was disestablished on 1 June 1975.

== Operational history ==
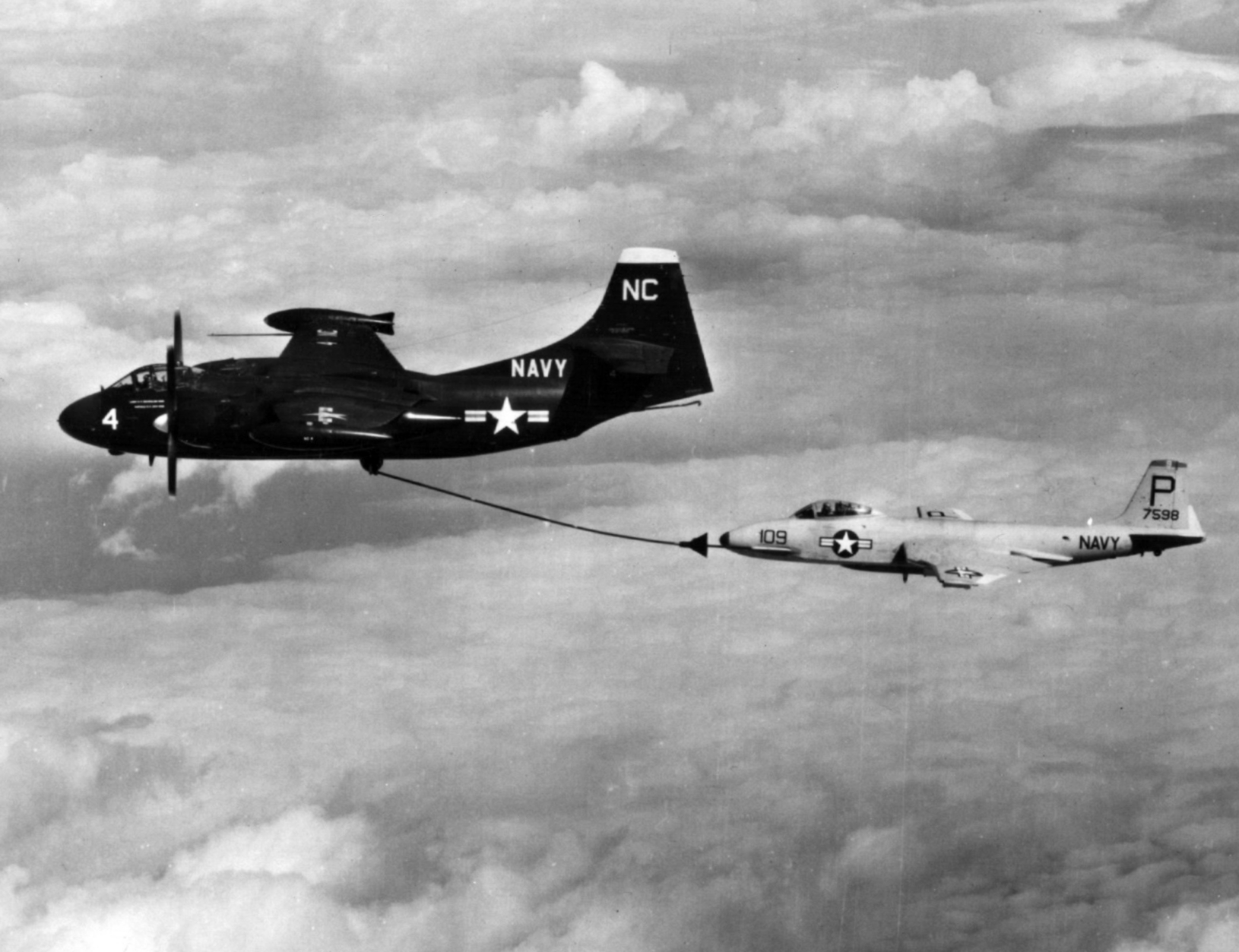
VC-8 AJ-2 Savage refuels a VF-11 F2H-4 in 1958

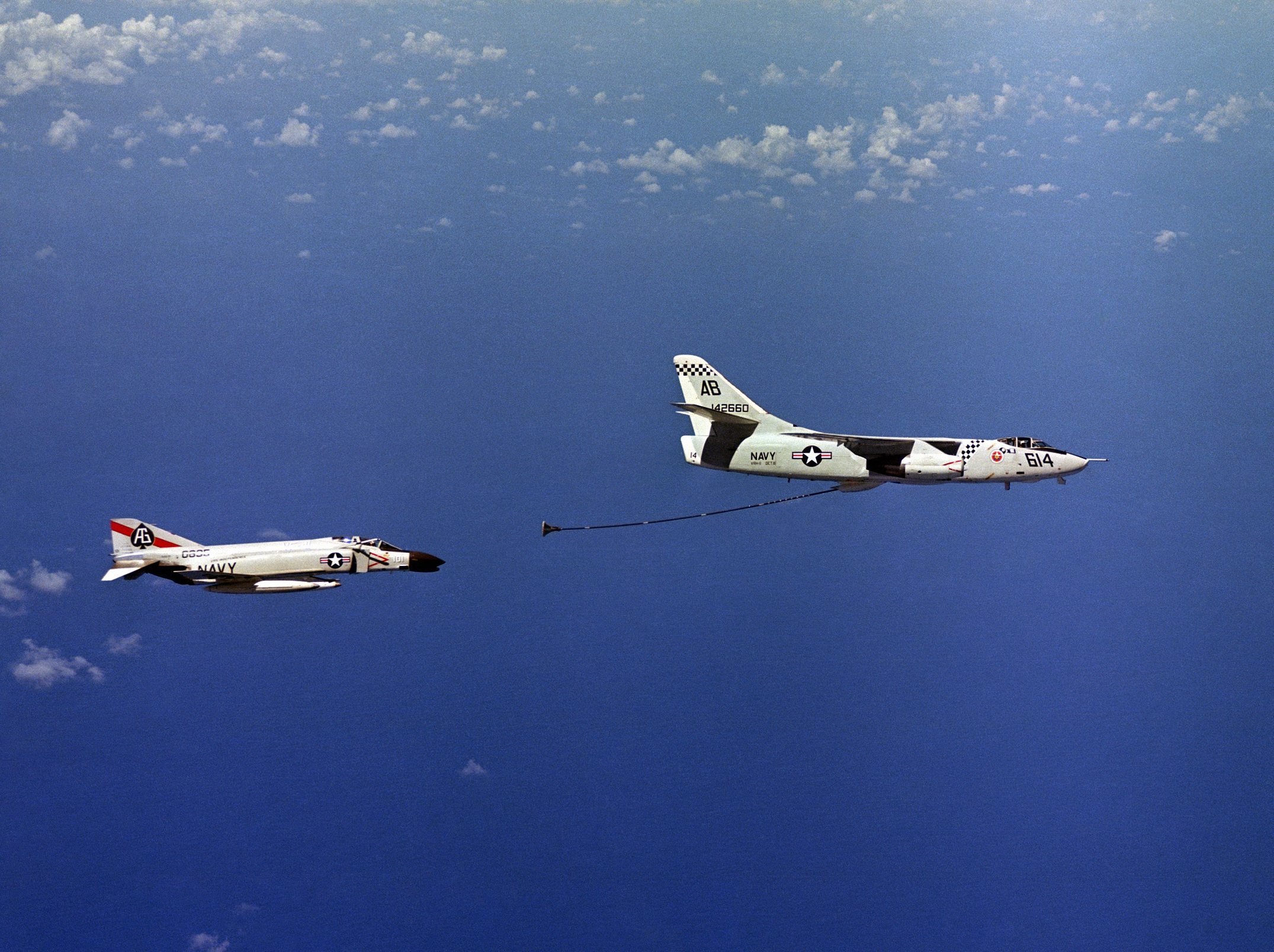
VAH-5 A-3B Skywarrior refuels an F-4B of VF-41 in 1964

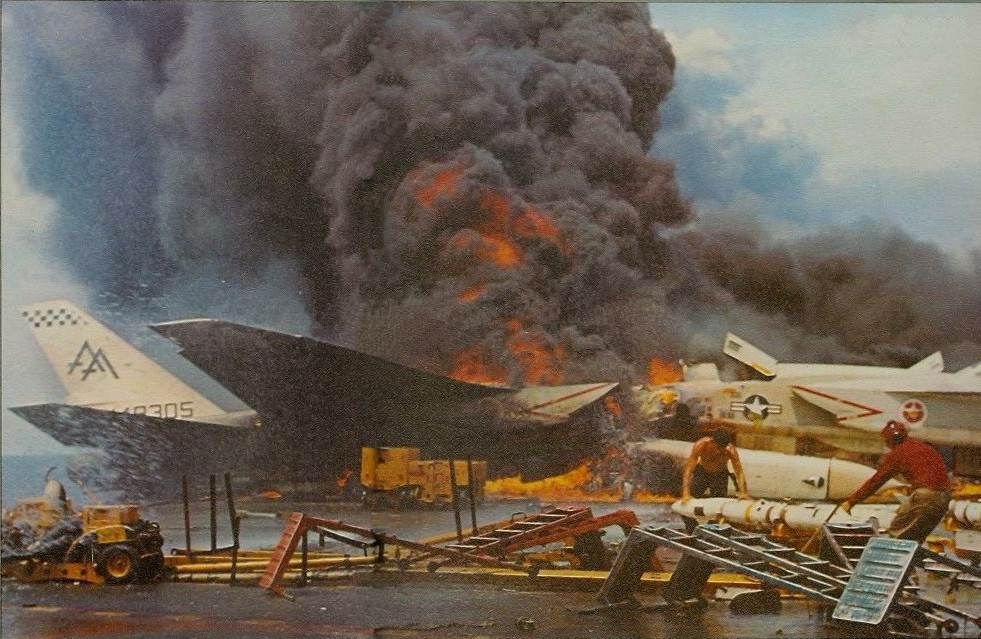
RVAH-11 RA-5C Vigilantes ablaze during the USS Forrestal fire, 29 July 1967

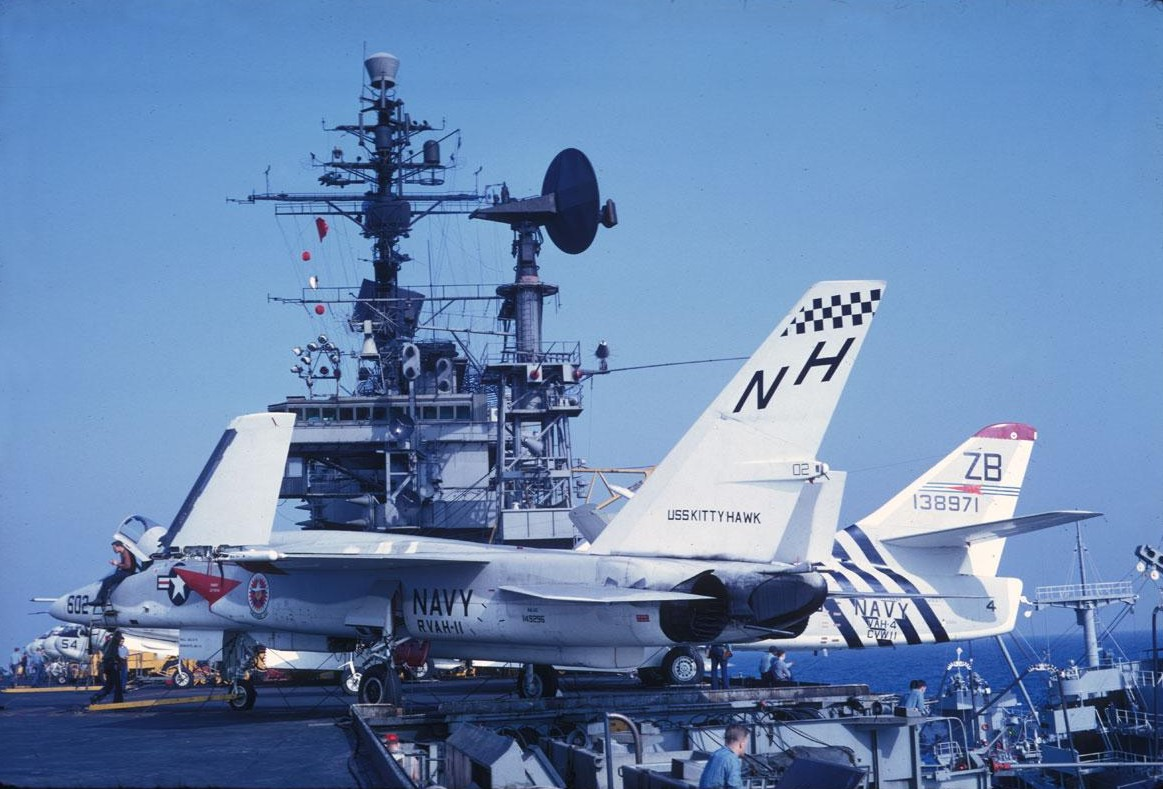
RVAH-11 RA-5C Vigilante on USS Kitty Hawk in 1968

=== VC-8 ===
VC-8 was established on 3 December 1951 at Naval Air Station Patuxent River, Maryland. A small group of officers collected from various other squadrons of the Heavy Attack Wing at NAS Patuxent River assembled in the Fleet Aircraft Support Squadron 52 Ready Room to hear Commander Eugene P. Rankin, one of the pilots of the famed P2V-1, the "Truculent Turtle," read the orders establishing VC-8. Approximately one minute after Commander Rankin finished, VC-8's first scheduled flight became airborne. Personnel from VC-5, VC-6, and VC-7 were pooled to form a nucleus for VC-8 as the first squadron equipped with the AN/ASB-1 radar bombing system that would later be incorporated into the AJ Savage and the A3D (later A-3B) Skywarrior. Unlike other VC squadrons previously formed, VC-8's first aircraft were not AJ-1 Savages, but P2V-3C Neptunes, later redesignated as P2V-3Bs. These aircraft would serve as training platforms until production AJ-1s became available for VC-8.

VC-8 later transitioned to and eventually operated both the AJ-1 and AJ-2 Savage. In 1955, VC-8 relocated to Naval Auxiliary Air Station Sanford, Florida, and on 1 November 1955, was redesignated as Heavy Attack Squadron Eleven (VAH-11), also known as Hatron Eleven.

=== VAH-11 / Cold War (pre-Vietnam) ===
VAH-11 continued to fly the AJ-1 and AJ-2 until reequipped with the A3D-2 Skywarrior in November 1957. With the replacement of the AJ-1 and AJ-2 with the new A3D, Naval Air Auxiliary Station Sanford was the focus of extensive military construction during the mid and late 1950s, all intended to upgrade the installation to full naval air station status as a Master Jet Base and resulting in its redesignation as Naval Air Station Sanford. Remaining homeported at NAS Sanford throughout its existence as VAH-11, the squadron made seven Mediterranean deployments, five aboard the USS Franklin D. Roosevelt and once each aboard the USS Independence and the USS Forrestal.

Given the size and complexity of the A3D as a carrier-based aircraft, mishaps plagued the VAH community during its early years Navy-wide. VAH-11 was not immune to this, and one fifteen-month period from March 1961 to June 1962 proved particularly costly:

- On 21 March 1961, while operating from the USS Franklin D. Roosevelt, a VAH-11 A3D-2, BuNo 138976, was lost at sea with all crewmembers. During a nuclear weapon loft maneuver demonstration abeam the carrier, the aircraft exceeded breakaway limits and the nose of the jet came down in a 70 degree dive. The dive flattened, but the aircraft struck the water in a nose high attitude.
- On 7 May 1961, another VAH-11 A3D-2, BuNo 142245, sustained a ramp strike on its initial pass aboard the USS Franklin D. Roosevelt. Four more attempts to land were unsuccessful and the crew successfully bailed out just south of Souda Bay, Crete.
- On 6 October 1961, while at Naval Air Station Sanford, A3D-2 BuNo 142637 was conducting training over the Lake George bombing target, part of the Navy Pinecastle Impact Range in the Ocala National Forest. During a bomb run on the target, the crew executed an inert bomb release, rolled the aircraft in excess of 90 degrees and disappeared into the clouds. Per range observers, the aircraft was next seen in a steep dive followed by an uncontrolled crash into Lake George with a loss of the entire crew.
- On 12 October 1961, only six days after the preceding mishap over Lake George, an A3D-2 assigned to VAH-11, BuNo 142648, collided in mid-air with another A3D-2, BuNo 142663, assigned to VAH-5 while both aircraft were on approach to landing at Naval Air Station Sanford. All eight crewmen, four in the VAH-5 aircraft and four in the VAH-11 aircraft, were killed.
- On 25 June 1962, while VAH-11 was again embarked aboard USS Franklin D. Roosevelt, A3D-2 BuNo 138962 experienced a dual-engine flameout. All crew except the pilot bailed out. The bombardier/navigator and an observer from the Roosevelt's ships company were rescued, but the pilot and 3rd crewmember were never recovered.

In September 1962, the Department of Defense instituted a new aircraft designation system, discarding the legacy USN / USMC / USCG designation system and effectively transitioning all branches of the U.S. armed forces to the USAF aircraft designation system. As a result, the A3D-2 was redesignated as the A-3B Skywarrior.

Between August 1962 and January 1965, VAH-11 was divided into two units: one with six Skywarriors performing all the normal duties of a heavy attack squadron deploying aboard Fleet aircraft carriers, and the other taking up an operational readiness posture from other heavy attack squadrons while they converted from A-3Bs to the North American A-5A or RA-5C Vigilante. In turn, VAH-11 transitioned to the RA-5C Vigilante in April 1966 and was redesignated Reconnaissance Attack Squadron Eleven (RVAH-11), also known as RECONATKRON ELEVEN, in July 1966.

=== Cold War/Vietnam ===
With the increasing U.S. military involvement in Vietnam after 1964, RVAH-11 added to the mix of RVAH squadrons participating in combat operations in Southeast Asia, although its first such deployment would be a watershed event in terms of shipboard and aviation safety for the U.S. Navy in general and Naval Aviation in particular:

- From 6 June - 15 September 1967, RVAH-11 was embarked aboard USS Forrestal for an Atlantic and Indian Ocean transit en route to its first Western Pacific (WESTPAC) and Vietnam deployment.
  - On 29 July 1967, three of the squadron's RA-5Cs, BuNo 148932, BuNo 149284 and BuNo 149305 were destroyed in the disastrous 1967 flight deck fire aboard USS Forrestal of the same date. None of the 134 men lost that day were RVAH-11 personnel. After a damage assessment and brief refit at Naval Station Subic Bay in the Philippines, the ship and air wing returned to their home stations and homeport on the east coast of the United States.

Subsequent deployments were as follows:

- 18 November 1967 – 29 June 1968, RVAH-11 was embarked aboard USS Kitty Hawk for a WESTPAC and Vietnam deployment.
  - On 18 May 1968, an RVAH-11 RA-5C, BuNo 149283, was shot down in combat over North Vietnam. The pilot, RVAH-11 Executive Officer CDR Charlie James, ejected successfully, was captured by the North Vietnamese and was repatriated to the United States on 14 March 1973. The remains of the navigator, LCDR Vince Monroe, were returned in August 1978.
  - The simultaneous budgetary pressures of the Vietnam War and President Lyndon Johnson's Great Society programs forced the Department of Defense to close several stateside U.S. Air Force and U.S. Navy air installations, to include Naval Air Station Sanford, as part of an economy move in the late 1960s. Upon return from their 1967-1968 deployment, RVAH-1 shifted its home station from NAS Sanford to the former Turner Air Force Base, renamed Naval Air Station Albany, Georgia, effective June 1968.
- 30 December 1968 – 4 September 1969, RVAH-11 was embarked aboard USS Kitty Hawk for a WESTPAC and Vietnam deployment. For this deployment, RVAH-11 became the first RVAH squadron to be awarded the Presidential Unit Citation.
- 23 June 1970 – 31 January 1971, RVAH-11 was embarked aboard USS Independence for a Mediterranean deployment.
- 1 October 1971 – 30 June 1972, RVAH-11 was embarked aboard USS Constellation for a WESTPAC and Vietnam deployment.

=== Cold War (post-Vietnam) ===
With the end of the Vietnam War, RVAH-11 returned to stateside training and forward deployed operations aboard Fleet aircraft carriers. Subsequent deployments were as follows:

- 16 April 1973 – 1 December 1973, RVAH-11 was embarked aboard USS John F. Kennedy for a Mediterranean deployment.
- 27 September 1973 – 19 March 1974, RVAH-11 was embarked aboard USS Saratoga for a Mediterranean deployment.
  - Budgetary pressures and force reductions following the end of the Vietnam War forced the Department of Defense to once again close several stateside U.S. Air Force and U.S. Navy air bases, to include Naval Air Station Albany, Georgia, as an economy move. In late 1974, RVAH-11 executed a shift of home station from NAS Albany to Naval Air Station Key West, Florida.

Attrition of airframes and the increasing maintenance and flight hour costs of the RA-5C in a constrained defense budget environment forced the Navy to incrementally retire the RA-5C and the RVAH community beginning in mid-1974. Carrier-based reconnaissance was concurrently conducted by the active duty VFP community with one squadron at Naval Air Station Miramar and the Naval Reserve VFP community with two squadrons at Andrews Air Force Base / NAF Washington with the RF-8G Crusader until 29 March 1987, when the last RF-8G was retired and the mission was fully transferred to the active duty and Naval Reserve VF community at Naval Air Station Miramar, Naval Air Station Oceana, Naval Air Station Dallas and NAS JRB Fort Worth as a secondary role with those F-14 Tomcat squadrons equipped with the Tactical Airborne Reconnaissance Pod System.

Following its return from its final Mediterranean deployment in 1974 and subsequent relocation to Naval Air Station Key West, RVAH-11 was disestablished at NAS Key West on 1 June 1975 following nearly 24 years of active naval service.

== Home station assignments ==
The squadron was assigned to these home stations:

- Naval Air Station Patuxent River, Maryland
- Naval Air Auxiliary Station Sanford / Naval Air Station Sanford, Florida
- Naval Air Station Albany, Georgia
- Naval Air Station Key West, Florida

== Aircraft Assigned ==
- P2V-3B Neptune
- AJ-1 and AJ-2 Savage
- A3D-2 / A-3B Skywarrior
- RA-5C Vigilante

== See also ==
- Reconnaissance aircraft
- List of inactive United States Navy aircraft squadrons
- History of the United States Navy
