= North American AJ Savage =

Carrier-based bomber aircraft

AJ (A-2) Savage
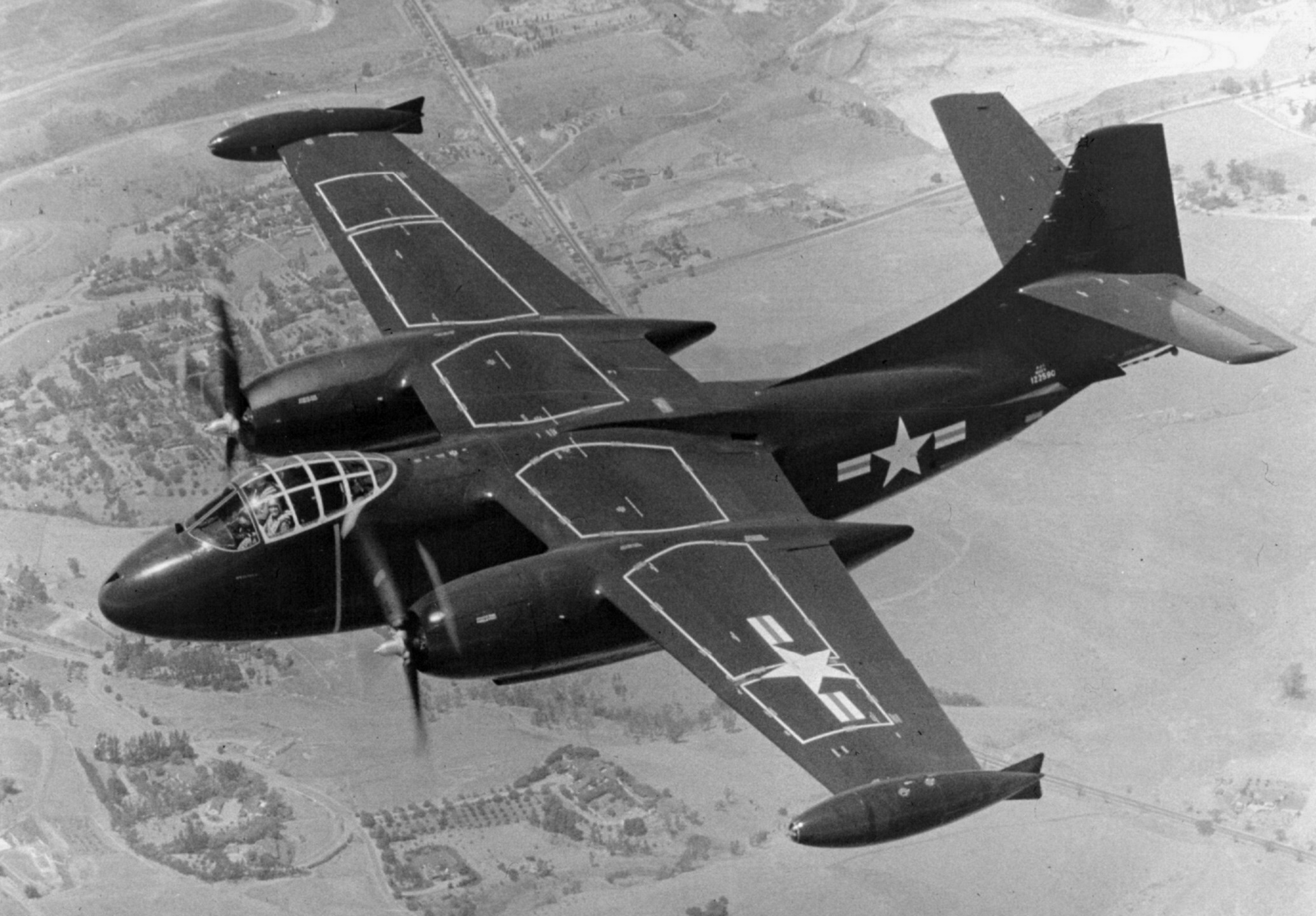
- The first production AJ-1 in flight over California, 1950

General information
- Type: Medium bomber
- National origin: United States
- Manufacturer: North American Aviation
- Status: Retired
- Primary user: United States Navy
- Number built: 143

History
- Introduction date: 1950
- First flight: 3 July 1948
- Retired: 1960
- Developed into: North American XA2J Super Savage

The North American AJ Savage (later A-2 Savage) was a U.S Navy carrier-based medium bomber built by North American Aviation. It was designed shortly after World War II to carry atomic bombs. To do this, it needed a 12,000-pound (5,400 kg) bomb load, making it the heaviest aircraft yet built to operate from a carrier.

The Savage was powered by two piston engines and a turbojet mounted in the rear fuselage. The AJ-1 entered service in 1950. Several were deployed to South Korea in 1953 as a deterrent against North Korea.

A total of 140 aircraft were built, along with three prototypes. Thirty were configured for reconnaissance. In the mid-1950s, inflight-refueling equipment was added.

The Savage began to be replaced in 1957 by the Douglas A3D Skywarrior. After its military career, it was used for experiments such as microgravity flights and jet engine testing.

== Design and development ==
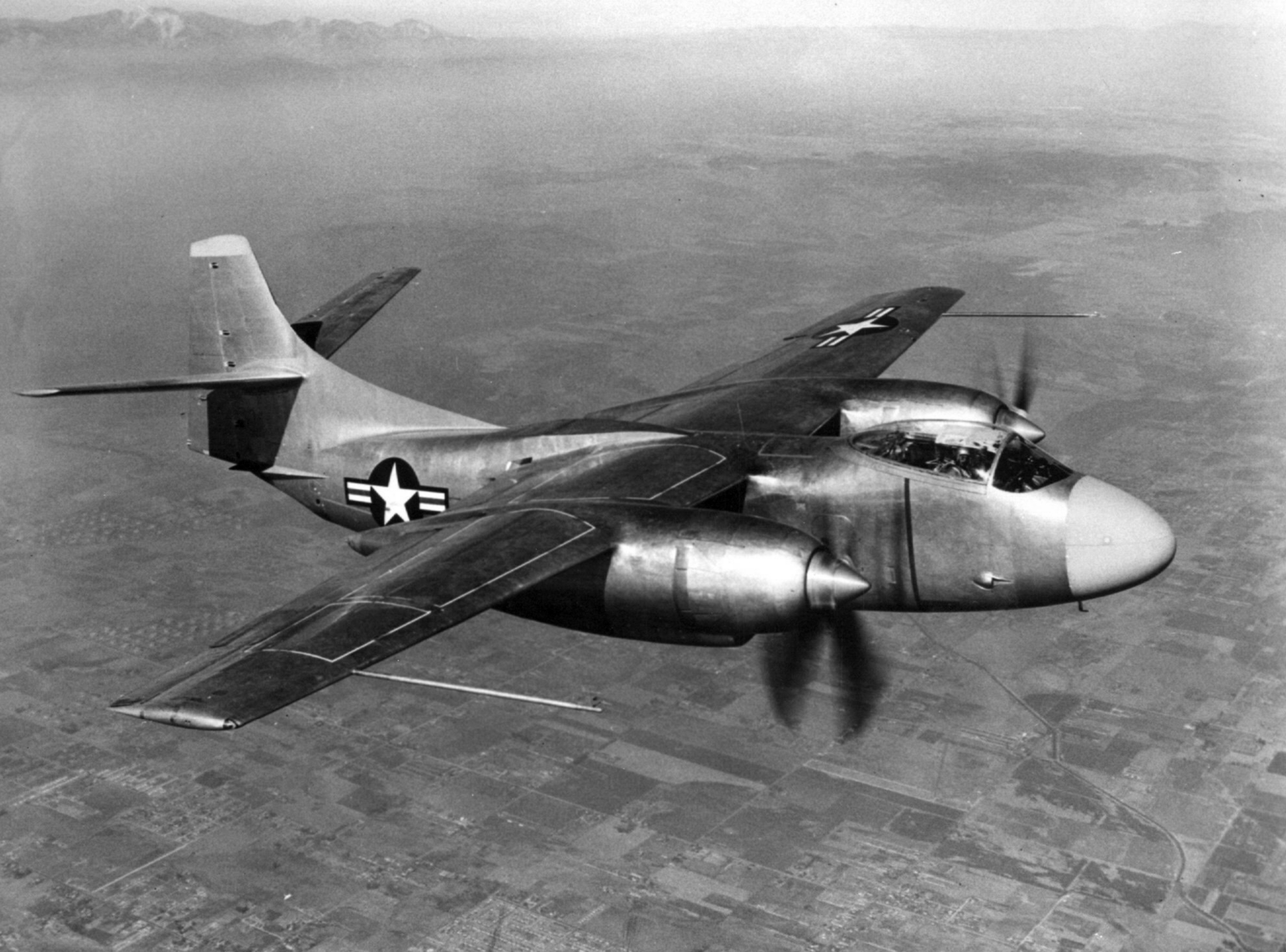
The XAJ-1 prototype first flew in 1948

At the end of World War II, the U.S. Navy began a design competition on 13 August 1945 for a carrier-based bomber which could carry a 10,000-pound (4,536 kg) bomb that was won by North American Aviation. Later that year, the Navy decided that it needed to be able to deliver atomic bombs and that the AJ Savage design would be adapted to accommodate the latest Mark 4 nuclear bomb, the next step in development from the more sophisticated imploding-plutonium-sphere design Fat Man Mk3 used on Nagasaki. A contract for three XAJ-1 prototypes and a static test airframe was awarded on 24 June 1946. The first prototype made its maiden flight two years later on 3 July 1948. That same year the US Navy began an interim capability program employing the Lockheed P-2 Neptune carrying a crash-program reproduction of the smaller, simpler all-uranium 'gun' design Little Boy nuclear bomb as its first carrier-launched nuclear bomber aircraft until the Savage was in service. The Neptune launched using JATO assist but could not land on existing carriers; if launched they had to either ditch at sea after the mission or land at a friendly airbase.

The AJ-1 was a three-seat, high-wing monoplane with tricycle landing gear. To facilitate carrier operations, the outer wing panels and the tailfin could be manually folded. It was fitted with two 2,300-brake-horsepower (1,700 kW) Pratt & Whitney R-2800-44W Double Wasp piston engines, mounted in nacelles under each wing with a large turbocharger fitted inside each engine nacelle, and a 4,600-pound-force (20,000 N) Allison J33-A-10 turbojet was fitted in the rear fuselage. The jet engine was only intended for takeoff and maximum speed near the target, and was fed by an air inlet on top of the fuselage that was normally kept closed to reduce drag. To simplify the fuel system, the jet engine used piston engine avgas rather than jet fuel. One 201-US-gallon (760 L; 167 imp gal) self-sealing fuel tank was housed in the fuselage, and another 508-US-gallon (1,920 L; 423 imp gal) tank was located in each wing. The aircraft usually carried 300-US-gallon (1,100 L; 250 imp gal) tip tanks and it could house three fuel tanks in the bomb bay with a total capacity of 1,640 US gallons (6,200 L; 1,370 imp gal). Other than its 12,000-pound (5,400 kg) bombload, the bomber was unarmed.

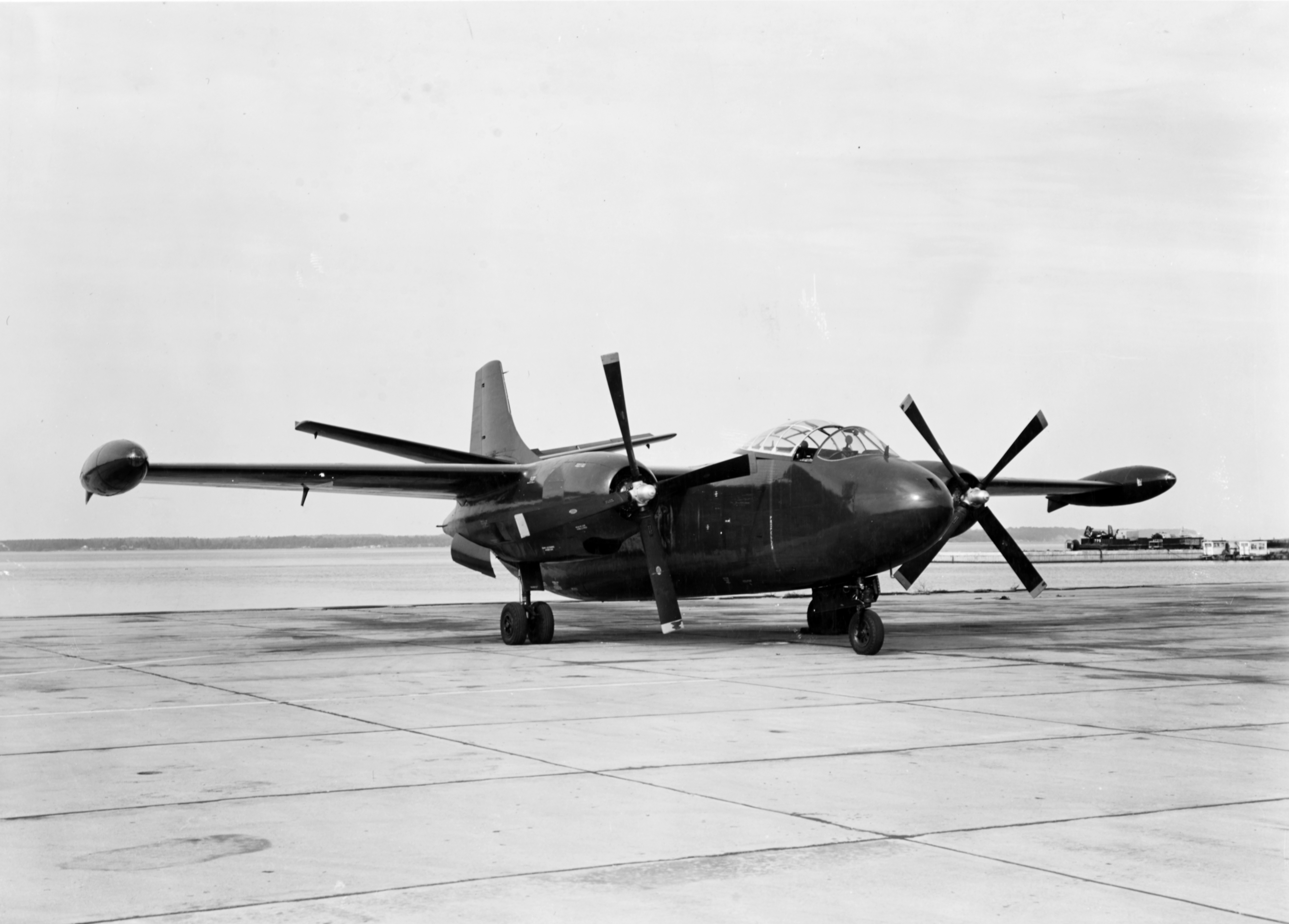
AJ-1 Savage in October 1949

Two of the three prototypes crashed during testing, but their loss did not materially affect the development of the aircraft as the first batch of Savages had been ordered on 6 October 1947. The most significant difference between the XAJ-1 and the production aircraft was the revision of the cockpit to accommodate a third crewman in a separate compartment. The first flight by a production aircraft occurred in May 1949 and Fleet Composite Squadron 5 (VC-5) became the first squadron to receive a Savage in September. The squadron participated in testing and evaluating the aircraft together with the Naval Air Test Center (NATC) in order to expedite the Savage's introduction into the fleet. The first carrier takeoff and landing made by the bomber took place from the USS Coral Sea on 21 April and 31 August 1950, respectively. Many, if not most, surviving AJ-1s had their tails upgraded to the improved AJ-2 configuration.

A photo-reconnaissance version of the Savage, initially known as the AJ-1P, but later designated as the AJ-2P, was ordered on 18 August 1950. It had improved R-2800-48 piston engines and the tail was redesigned to add 1 foot (30 cm) of height to the tailfin. The 12° dihedral of the tail stabilizers was eliminated and the rudder enlarged which slightly lengthened the aircraft. Early AJ-2Ps retained the three-man crew, but late-model aircraft added a fourth aft-facing crewman to the upper cockpit. The Savage's internal fuel capacity was also increased. The nose of the aircraft was remodeled with a prominent "chin" to accommodate a forward-looking oblique camera and a variety of oblique and vertical cameras could be fitted in the bomb bay. Photoflash bombs could be carried for night photography missions.

The AJ-2 incorporated all of the changes made to the late model AJ-2P and 55 aircraft were ordered on 14 February 1951. The AJ-2 deleted the separate compartment for the third crewman, but retained the third seat in the cockpit from the AJ-2P.

Around 1954, NATC modified the sole surviving XAJ-1 to conduct inflight refueling tests using the probe and drogue configuration. The turbojet engine was removed and the fuel hose and its drogue extended out from the jet's former exhaust opening. Aircraft in service retained the turbojet and had their bomb bay doors modified to accommodate the hose and drogue. They were refueling aircraft during late 1954.

== Operational history ==
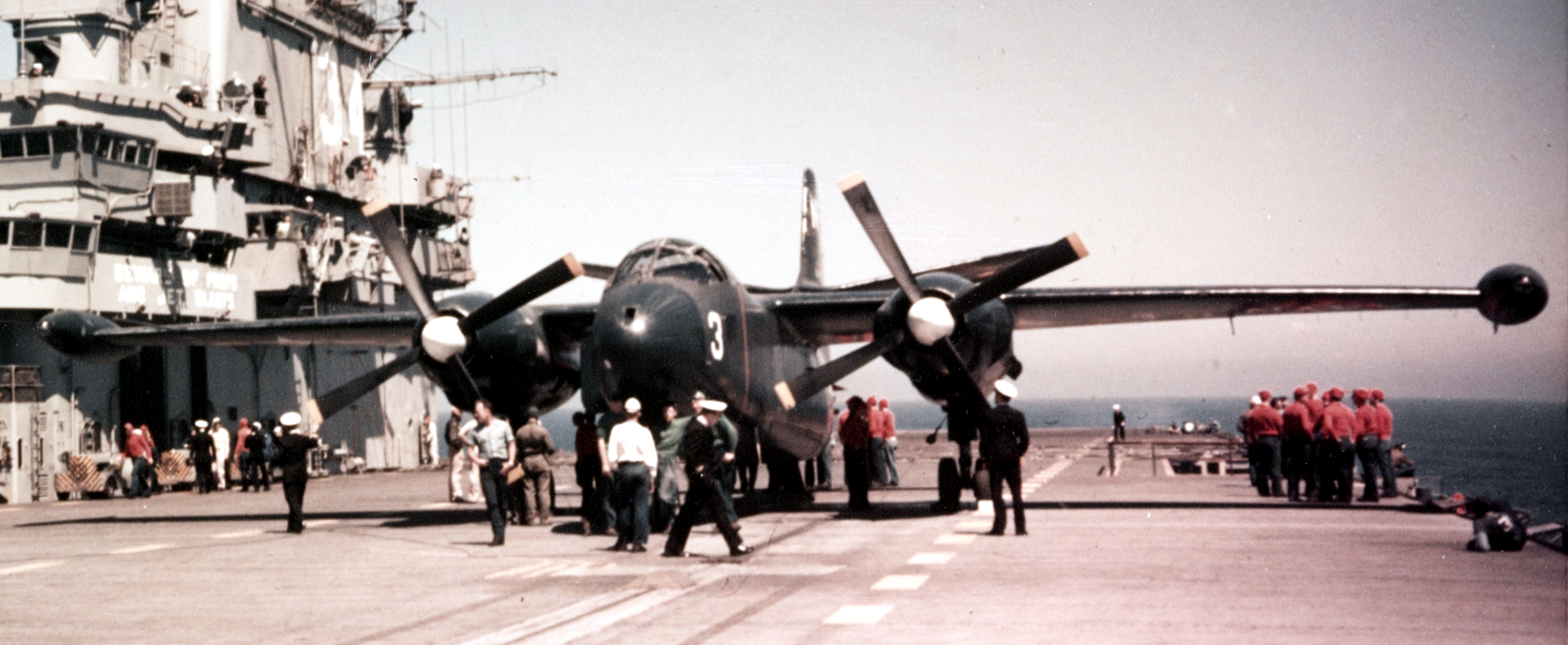
An AJ-1 aboard the modernized Essex-class carrier USS Oriskany on 29 August 1952

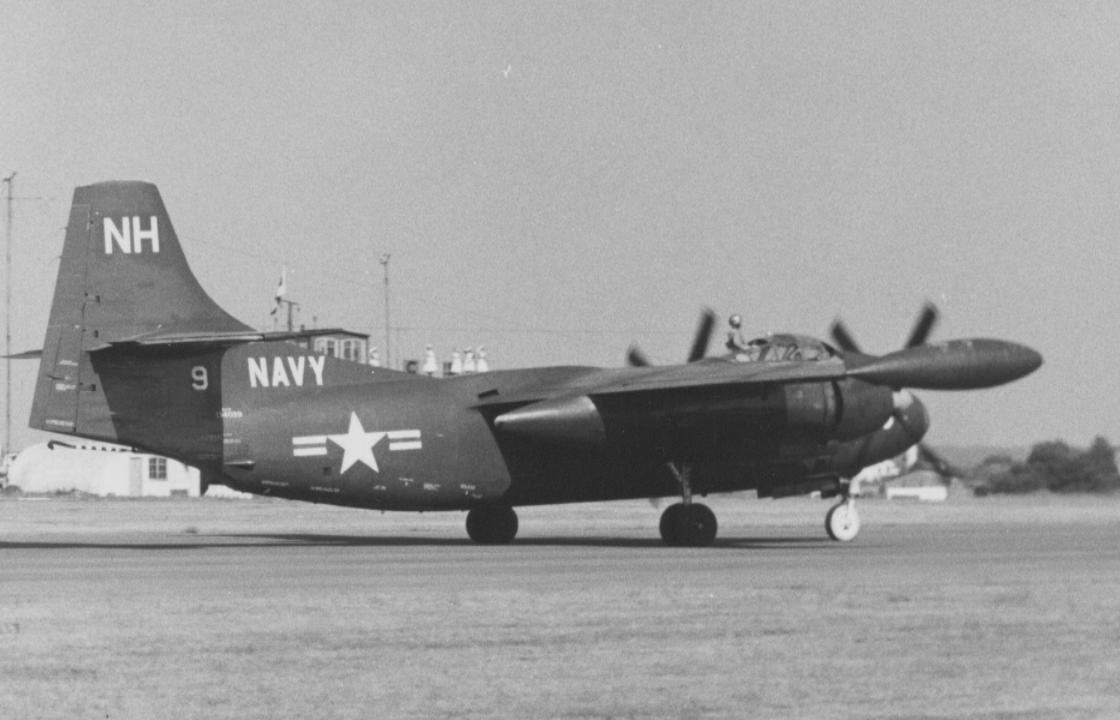
AJ-2 Savage of VC-7 from NAS Port Lyautey, Morocco, at Blackbushe Airport, in September 1955

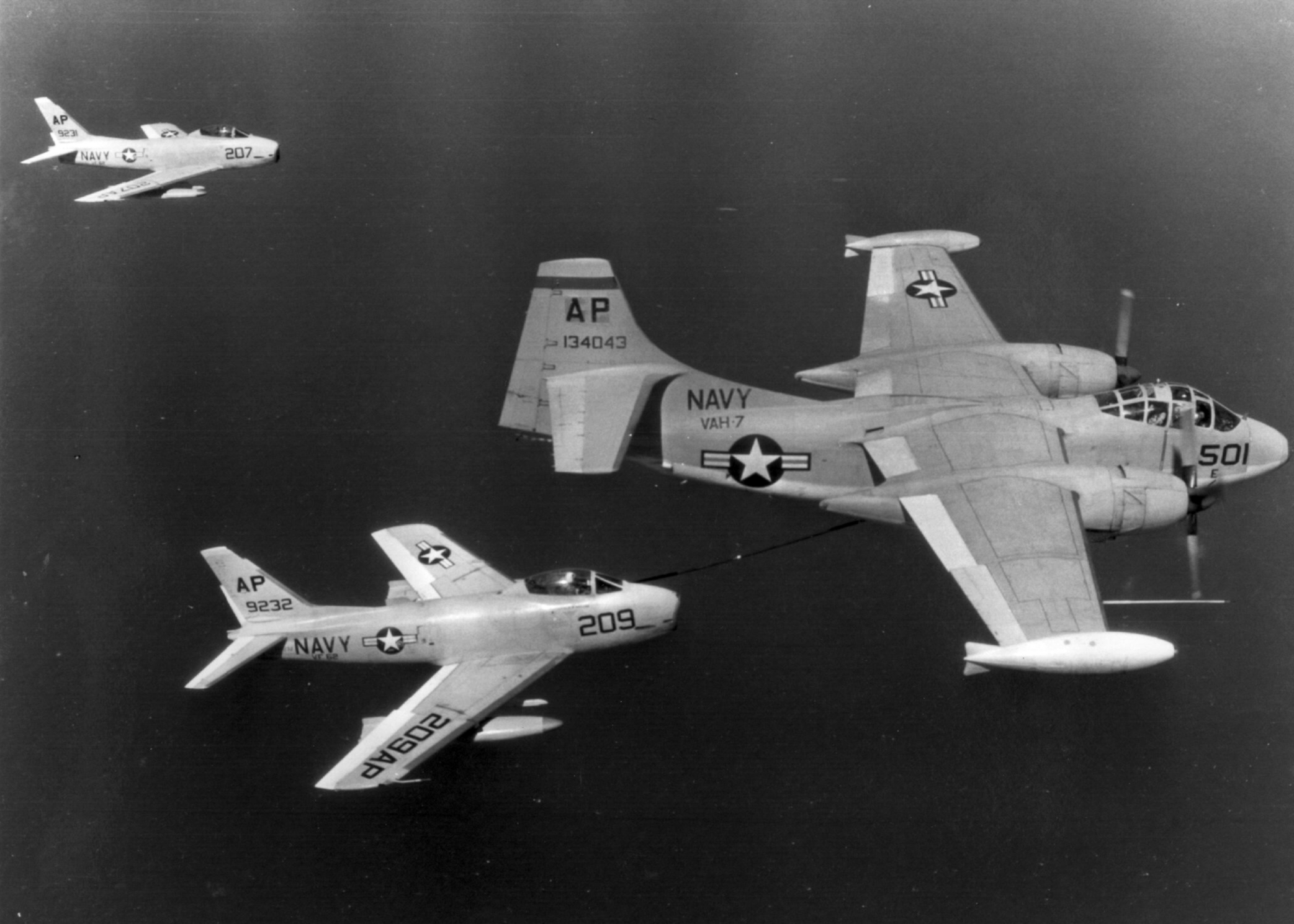
An AJ-2 refuels FJ-3M Fury fighter aircraft in 1958

When first deployed, the AJ-1 was too large and heavy to be used by any American aircraft carrier except for the Midway class. The modernized Essex class carriers with reinforced decks and the very large Forrestal class could also handle the Savage. The aircraft was not popular aboard ship as "it was so big and cumbersome that it complicated any other flight operations the ship was required to conduct." One problem was that the wings had to be folded one at a time by a crewman on top of the fuselage with a portable hydraulic pump, a time-consuming process, so that the bomber could be moved out of the way to allow other aircraft to land or take off. One pilot reported that the AJ-1 was "a dream to fly and handled like a fighter", when everything was working properly. The aircraft, however, was not very reliable, possibly because it was rushed into production before all the problems could be ironed out.

Early in the Savage's career, squadrons would typically deploy a detachment to Naval Air Station Port Lyautey, Morocco, for service with the Sixth Fleet and fly the bombers aboard aircraft carriers that were already deployed to the Mediterranean as needed. The plan was that the Savages would then be loaded with atomic bombs already aboard the carriers and launched once the carriers were in the Eastern Mediterranean Sea. The tactic to deliver the bombs was to fly at low level through Bulgaria and Romania before climbing at maximum power to the proper altitude to release the bomb. The aircraft would then perform a wingover maneuver and dive to low altitude, keeping the tail of the aircraft aimed at the target to avoid serious damage from the shock wave of the explosion.

Fleet Composite Squadron 5 (VC-5) made the first of its three deployments from Naval Air Station Norfolk, Virginia to NAS Port Lyautey in February 1951. Due to homeport changes, VC-5's next two deployments would originate from Naval Air Station Jacksonville, Florida followed by Naval Auxiliary Air Station Sanford, Florida.

Fleet Composite Squadron 6 (VC-6) at NAS Moffett Field, California received its first Savages in late 1950 and deployed to NAS Port Lyautey in October 1951 before transferring to the Pacific Fleet in October 1952. In July 1953 it deployed a detachment of two aircraft to K-3 Air Base in Korea to act as a nuclear deterrent. VC-7, VC-8, and VC-9 received their AJ-1s beginning in June 1951 and all remained on the East Coast of the United States. The Navy redesignated all of its Savage-equipped composite squadrons as heavy attack squadrons (VAH) on 1 November 1955. The squadrons retained their existing numbers except for VC-8 which became VAH-11 as all East Coast squadrons were odd-numbered.

AJ tankers were used to refuel then-Marine Corps Major John Glenn's Vought F8U-1P Crusader during the Project Bullet transcontinental speed record flight in July 1957; AJ-2s from VAH-6 on the West Coast and AJ-1s from VAH-11 on the East Coast. Beginning in 1957 the Douglas A3D Skywarrior began to replace the Savages in the VAH Squadrons. Their refueling role was continued by the formation in January 1958 of VAH-15 on the United States East Coast and VAH-16 on the United States West Coast. Both squadrons were equipped with AJ-2s, but both were short-lived and disbanded early the following year.

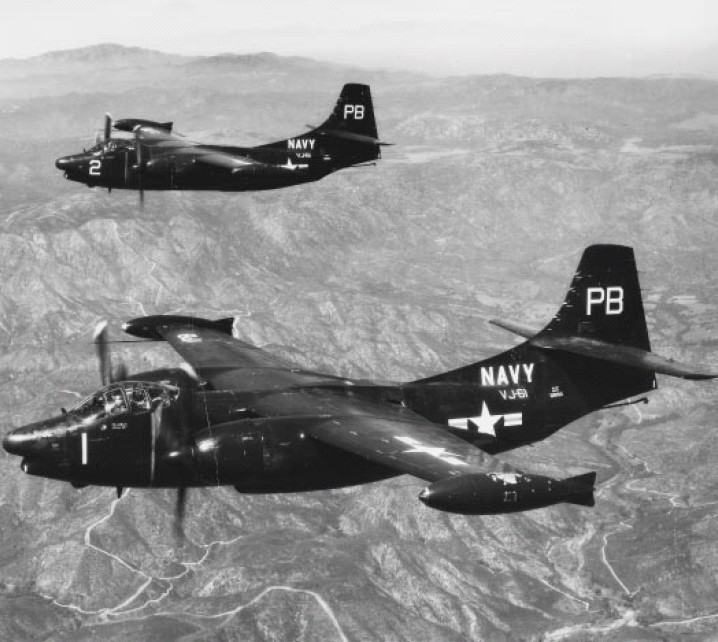
Two AJ-2Ps of VAP-61 in 1953

The AJ-2P was flown by Photographic Squadron 61 (VJ-61) and Photographic Squadron 62 (VJ-62), both of which were redesignated as Heavy Photographic Squadrons, VAP-61 and VAP-62, respectively, on 2 July 1956. VJ-61 was assigned to the Pacific Fleet and VJ-62 to the Atlantic Fleet. The squadrons never deployed as complete units, but rather deployed as one to three aircraft detachments. Detachment Queen was formed by VJ-61 during the Korean War at Naval Station Sangley Point, in the Philippines, to fly reconnaissance missions over the People's Republic of China and North Korea. The detachment continued its missions after the war until at least June 1954. Both squadrons frequently provided photographic mapping for agencies outside the Navy like the Army Map Service, United States Army Corps of Engineers, United States Coast and Geodetic Survey, and U.S. Departments of the Interior and Agriculture. The AJ-2s in these squadrons were replaced by Douglas A3D-2P Skywarriors beginning in 1959, although the last month that they were reported in squadron service was January 1960. Surviving AJ-1 and AJ-2 aircraft became A-2As and A-2Bs, respectively, when the Department of Defense redesignated all U.S. military aircraft in a common series in 1962.

Three AJ-2s were loaned to the National Aeronautics and Space Administration as weightlessness simulators from January 1960 to September 1964. They were eventually destroyed during firefighting training. Three AJ-1s were purchased by AJ Air Tankers, Inc. in early 1960 for use as water bombers. Their turbojets were removed before the delivery flight to California, during which one aircraft crashed. The two surviving aircraft were fully modified for the role after delivery and could carry 2,000 US gallons (7,600 L; 1,700 imp gal) of fire retardant. They first flew missions during the 1961 fire season. Another aircraft crashed on takeoff in September 1967 when an engine failed and the sole survivor only made a few more flights before it was scrapped in 1968–69.

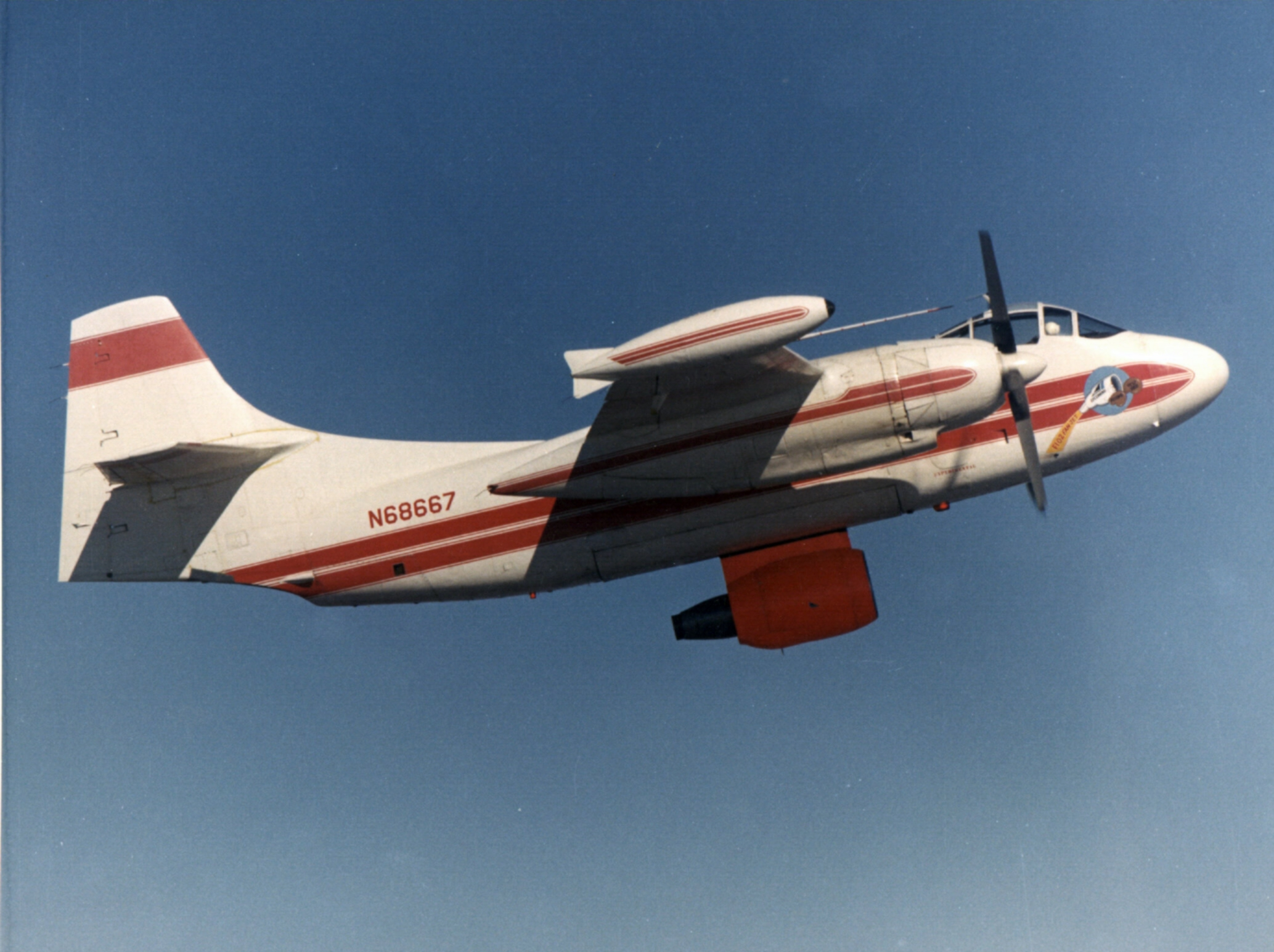
The Avco Lycoming Savage with the YF102 extended

At least one other AJ-2 was purchased and used as a water bomber before it was purchased in 1970 by Avco Lycoming for use as an engine testbed for the YF102 turbofan engine. The J33 turbojet had to be reinstalled and the aircraft required almost a year of maintenance before it could be flown to Avco Lycoming's home airfield at Stratford, Connecticut. The YF102, too fat to fully fit in the bomb bay, was mounted on a retractable mechanism that could be lowered below the aircraft for tests. The testing was conducted from January to July 1972. Another round of testing on the commercial derivative of the F102, the ALF 502, was performed between January 1979 and December 1980. In 1984, routine maintenance discovered several loose rivets on the spar and further examination showed that the skin was starting to separate from the spar. This damage was too uneconomical to repair so Avco Lycoming decided to donate the last surviving Savage to the National Museum of Naval Aviation. The AJ-2 was flown to Naval Air Station Pensacola in Pensacola, Florida on 9 May 1984.

== Variants ==
XAJ-1
Prototype with two 2,300 hp (1,715 kW) Pratt & Whitney R-2800-44 radial engines and one Allison J33-A-10 turbojet; three built.
AJ-1 (A-2A)
Initial production version with two 2,400 hp (1,790 kW) R-2800-44W radial engines and one J33-A-10 turbojet; 55 built, survivors redesignated A-2A in 1962.
AJ-2 (A-2B)
Updated production version with two 2,500 hp (1,864 kW) R-2800-48 radial engines and one J33-A-10, taller tailfin, slightly longer fuselage, increased fuel capacity; 55 built, survivors redesignated A-2B in 1962.
AJ-2P
Photo-reconnaissance version of the AJ-2 with array of cameras; 30 built.
AJ-3
Proposed AJ-2 derivative with folded dimensions measuring 56 ft (17 m) long and with a 42 ft (13 m) wingspan through the use of a shorter fuselage, taller tail, folding radome, and shorter wings to ease handling onboard aircraft carrier decks by fitting on the smaller forward centerline elevator of SCB-27A Essex-class aircraft carriers.
NA-146
Company designation for three prototypes delivered to the USN as XAJ-1.
NA-155
Development of the XAJ-1; mockup only, not built.

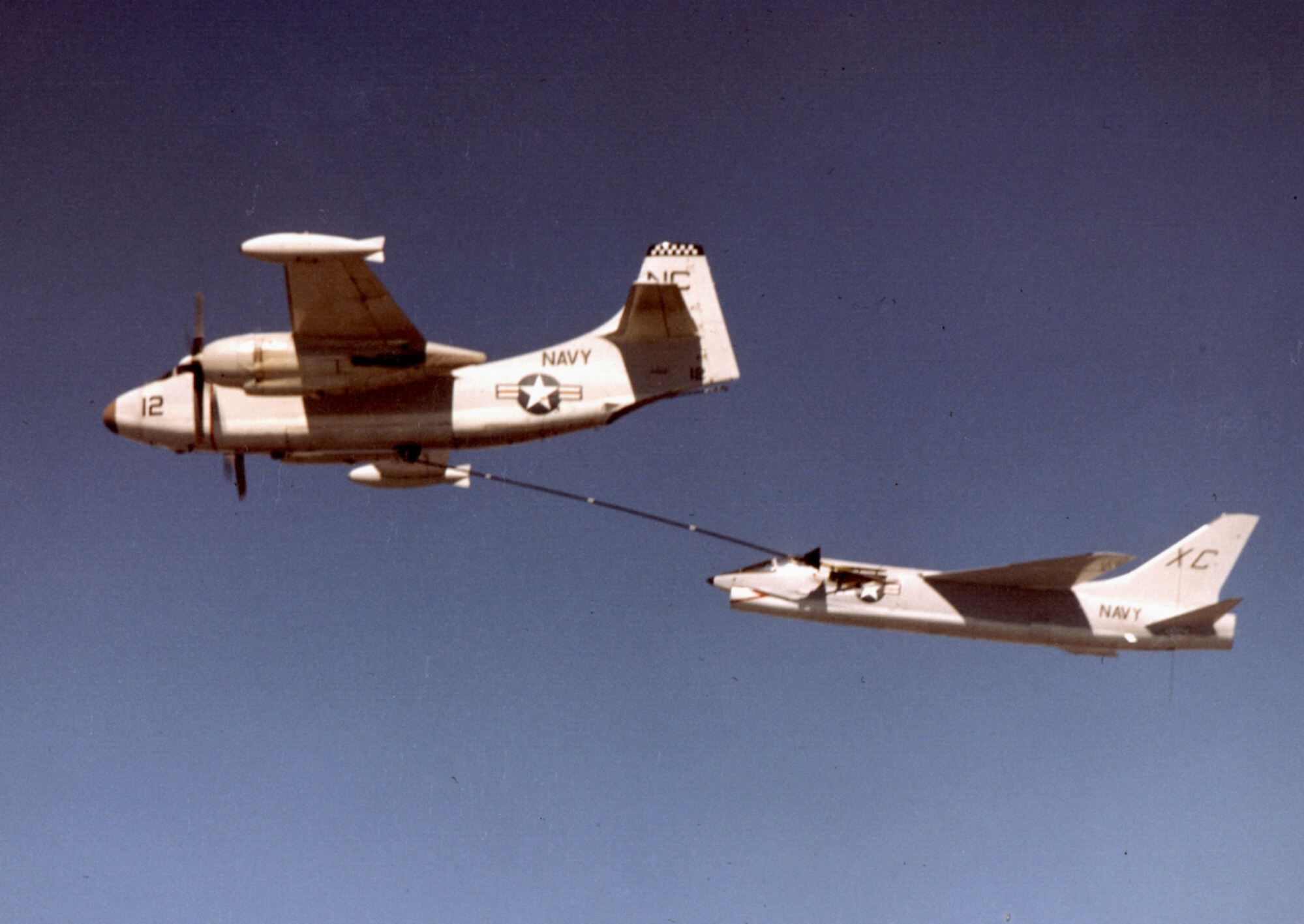
An AJ-2 refueling a Vought F8U-1 Crusader fighter during the 1950s

NA-156
Production variant delivered to the USN as AJ-1; 12 built.
NA-160
Production variant delivered to the USN as AJ-1; 28 built.
NA-169
Production variant delivered to the USN as AJ-1; 15 built.
NA-175
Photo-reconnaissance variant delivered to the USN as AJ-2P; 23 built.
NA-183
Photo-reconnaissance variant delivered to the USN as AJ-2P; 7 built.
NA-184
Improved production variant delivered to the USN as AJ-2; 55 built.
XSSM-N-4 Taurus
Proposed unmanned variant as a surface-to-surface missile. Cancelled in 1948, none built.

== Operators ==
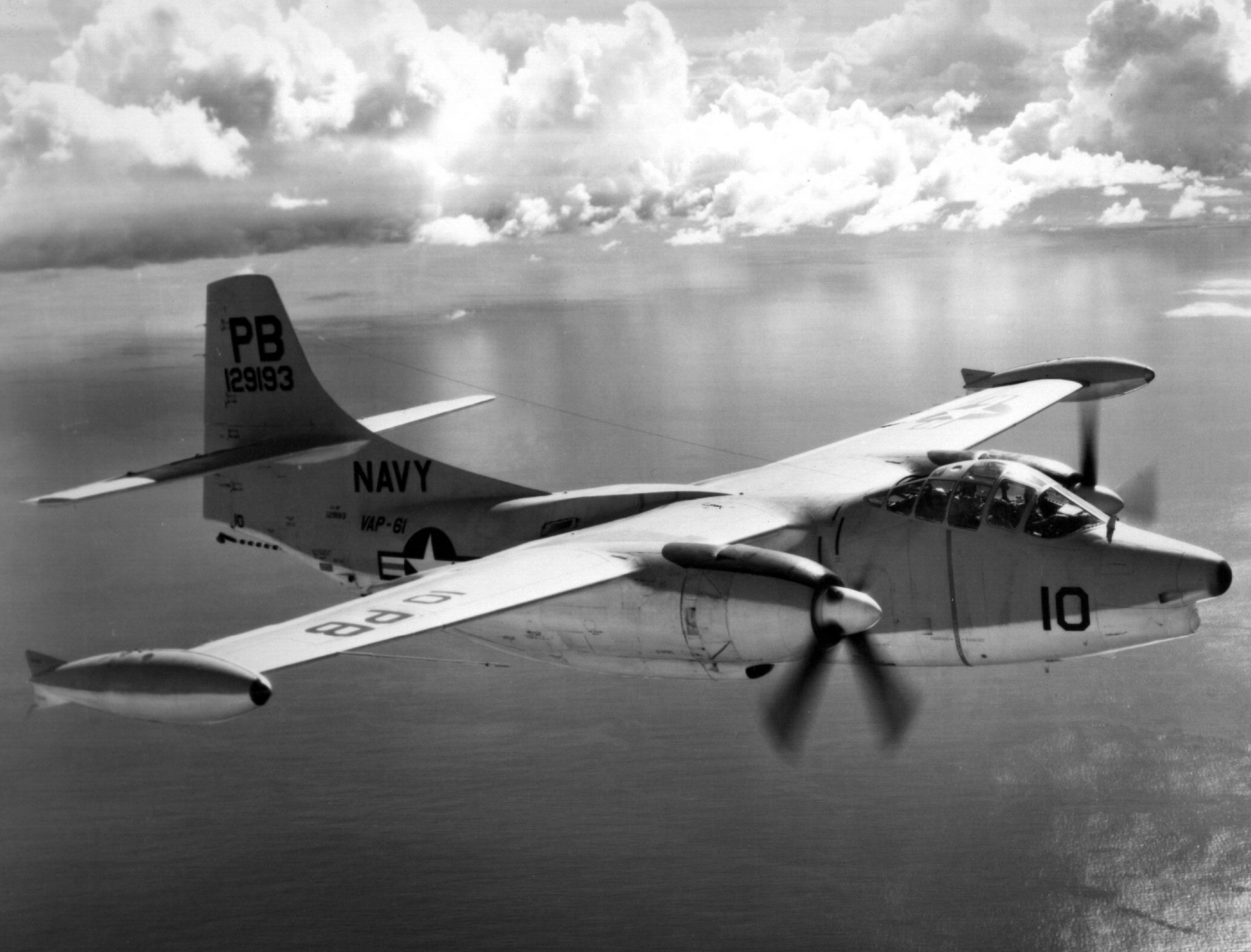
An AJ-2P of VAP-61

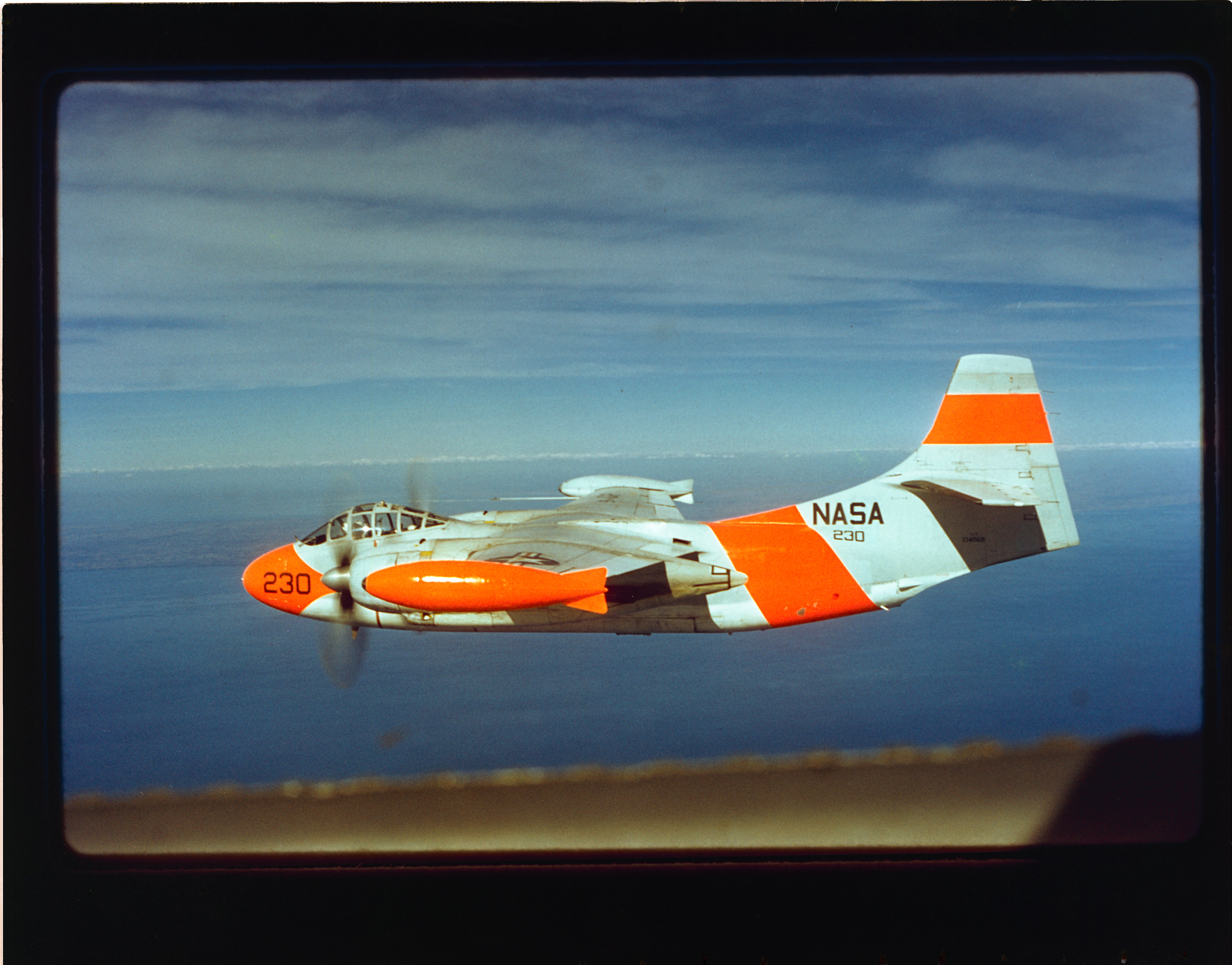
The NASA AJ-2 for microgravity flights

United States

- United States Navy
  - VC-5 / VAH-5 - September 1949 to September 1957
  - VC-6 / VAH-6 - January 1950 to January 1957
  - VC-7 / VAH-7 - June 1951 to February 1959
  - VC-8 / VAH-11 - December 1951 to January 1958
  - VC-9 / VAH-9 - April 1953 to April 1957
  - VAH-15 - March 1958 to January 1959
  - VAH-16 - January 1958 to January 1959
  - VJ-61 / VAP-61 - September 1952 to February 1960
  - VJ-62 / VAP-62 - August 1952 to December 1959
  - Heavy Attack Training Unit - November 1953 to March 1956
- National Aeronautics and Space Administration: 3 AJ-2 from 1960 to 1964 as weightlessness simulators
- AJ Air Tankers, Inc.: 3 AJ-1 used for firefighting during the 1960s
- Avco-Lycoming: 1 AJ-2 used as an engine testbed from 1970 to 1984

== Aircraft on display ==
Only one preserved Savage exists today:

- A-2B Savage, Bureau Number 130418, which is displayed at the National Naval Aviation Museum at Naval Air Station Pensacola, Florida.

== Specifications (AJ-1) ==
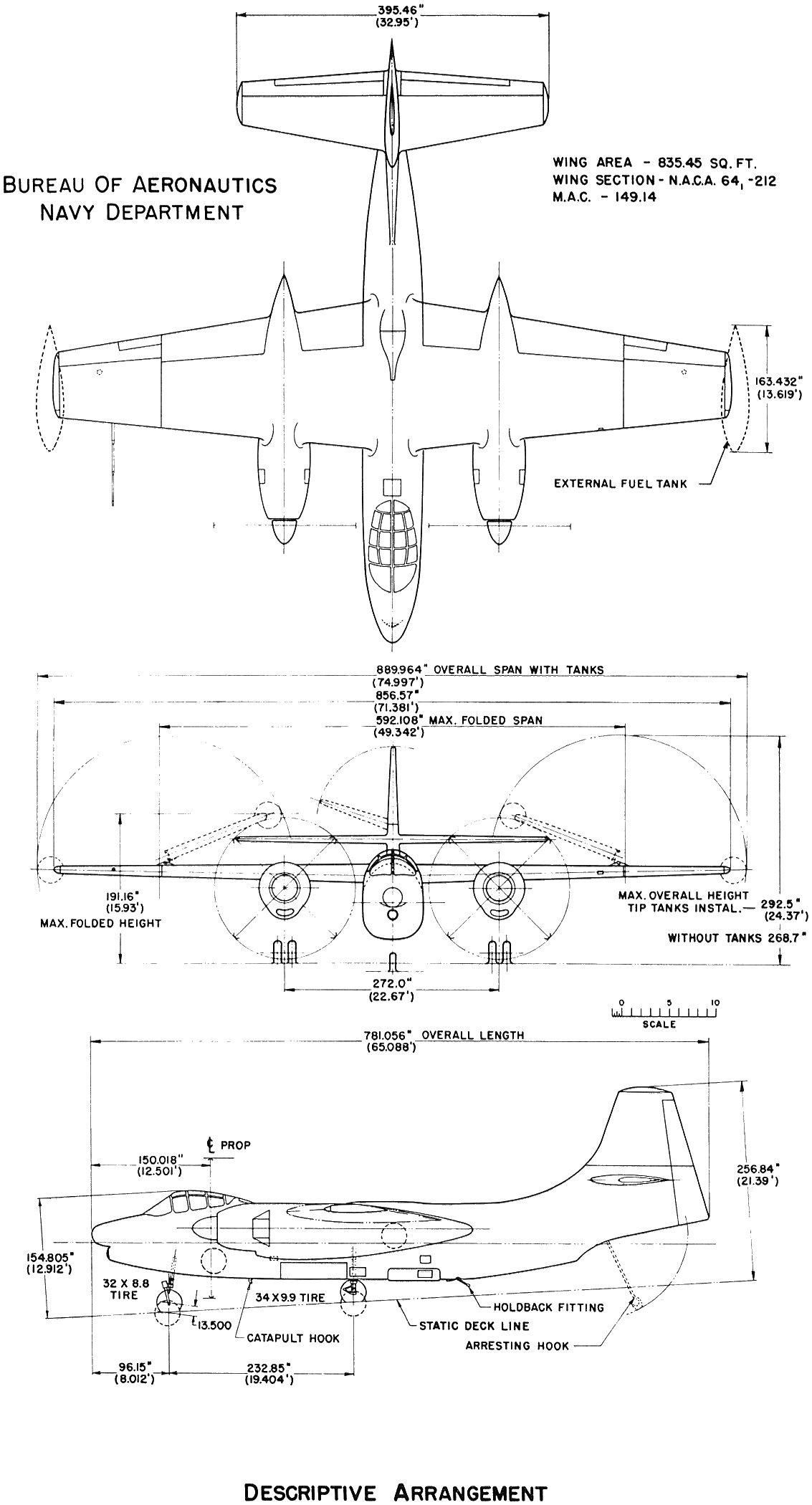
3-view line drawing of the North American AJ-2P Savage

Data from U.S. Navy Standard Aircraft Characteristics, American Attack Aircraft Since 1926 and United States Navy Aircraft Since 1911

General characteristics

- Crew: 3
- Length: 63 ft 0.72 in (19.2207 m)
- Wingspan: 71 ft 4.56 in (21.7566 m) without tip tanks

75 ft (23 m) with tip tanks

- Width: 50 ft 6 in (15.39 m) wings folded
- Height: 20 ft 6.24 in (6.2545 m)

16 ft (4.9 m) fin folded

- Wing area: 835.45 sq ft (77.616 m^{2})
- Airfoil: NACA 64-212
- Empty weight: 27,558 lb (12,500 kg)
- Gross weight: 47,000 lb (21,319 kg)
- Max takeoff weight: 50,954 lb (23,112 kg)
- Powerplant: 2 × Pratt & Whitney R-2800-44W Double Wasp 18-cylinder air-cooled radial piston engines, 2,400 hp (1,800 kW) each
- Powerplant: 1 × Allison J33-A-10 turbojet engine, 4,600 lbf (20 kN) thrust
- Propellers: 4-bladed Hamilton Standard, 14 ft 6 in (4.42 m) diameter constant-speed propellers

Performance

- Maximum speed: 471 mph (758 km/h, 409 kn)
- Range: 1,731 mi (2,786 km, 1,504 nmi)
- Service ceiling: 40,800 ft (12,400 m)
- Rate of climb: 2,900 ft/min (15 m/s)
- Time to altitude:
  - 12 minutes to 10,000 ft (3,048 m) @ normal power
  - 26 minutes to 20,000 ft (6,096 m) @ normal power
- Wing loading: 63.2 lb/sq ft (309 kg/m^{2})
- Power/mass: 0.091 hp/lb (0.150 kW/kg) (R-2800s only)
- Thrust/weight: 0.087 (J33 only)

Armament

- Hardpoints: Internal bomb bay (12,000 lb (5,400 kg) of ordnance) , with provisions to carry combinations of:
  - Bombs:
    - 1 × Mark 4 nuclear bomb or Mark 5 nuclear bomb
    - 4 × 2,000-lb bombs or Mk.39 2,000-lb mine
    - 3 × Mk.25 2,000-lb mine
    - 6 × 1,600-lb bombs
    - 8 × 1,000-lb bombs or 1,000-lb mine
    - 12 × 500-lb bombs
    - 12 × 250-lb bombs
    - 16 × 100-lb bombs
  - Other: 2 × 600-gal jettisonable tip tanks

Avionics

- AN/APS-31 search radar
- AN/ASB-1 bomb director

== See also ==
Related development

- North American XA2J Super Savage

Related lists

- List of military aircraft of the United States

== Bibliography ==
- Chorlton, Martyn. North American – Company Profile 1928–1996. Cudham, Kent, United Kingdom: Kelsey Publishing, 2013. ISBN 978-1-907426-61-2.
- Ginter, Steve. North American AJ-1 Savage (Naval Fighters Number 22). Simi Valley, California: Steve Ginter, 1992. ISBN 0-942612-22-1.
- Grossnick, Roy A. (1995). Dictionary of American Naval Aviation Squadrons: Volume 1 The History of VA, VAH, VAK, VAL, VAP and VFA Squadrons. Washington, DC: Naval Historical Center, Department of the Navy. ISBN 0-945274-29-7.
- Kernahan, George (1990). "North American AJ Savage". Aeromilitaria. No. 4. Air-Britain. pp. 95–102.
- Johnson, E.R. American Attack Aircraft Since 1926. Jefferson, North Carolina: McFarland, 2008. ISBN 978-0-7864-3464-0.
- Miller, Jerry. Nuclear Weapons and Aircraft Carriers: How the Bomb Saved Naval Aviation. Washington, D.C.: Smithsonian Institution Press, 2001. ISBN 1-56098-944-0.
- Parsch, Andreas. North American SSM-N-4 Taurus. Directory of U.S. Military Rockets and Missiles, Appendix 1: Early Missiles and Drones. Designation-Systems. Accessed 17 December 2017.
- Standard Aircraft Characteristics: AJ-1 "Savage". Washington, D.C.: United States Navy, 30 June 1957.
- Swanborough, Gordon and Peter M. Bowers. United States Navy Aircraft Since 1911. London: Putnam, 3rd ed., 1990. ISBN 0-85177-838-0.
- Wilson, Stewart. Combat Aircraft Since 1945. Fyshwick, Australia: Aerospace Publications, 2000. ISBN 1-875671-50-1.
