= Boeing F/A-18E/F Super Hornet =

Series of carrier-based multirole combat aircraft

F/A-18E/F Super Hornet
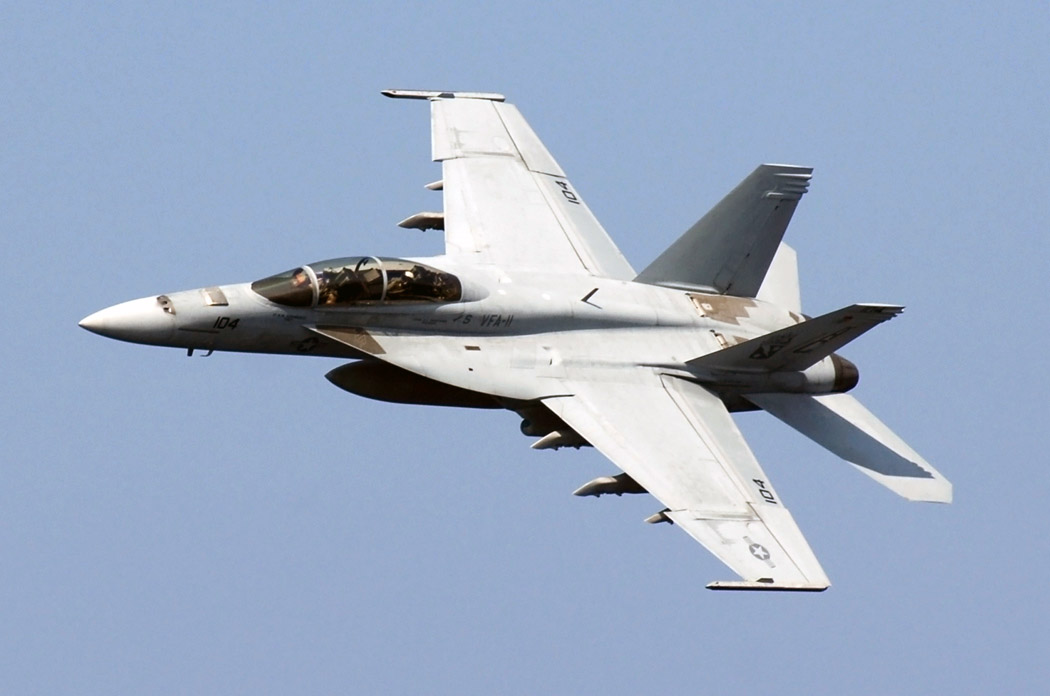
- U.S. Navy F/A-18F Super Hornet

General information
- Type: Carrier-based multirole fighter
- National origin: United States
- Manufacturer: McDonnell Douglas (1995–1997); Boeing Defense, Space & Security (1997–present)
- Status: In service
- Primary users: United States Navy Royal Australian Air Force; Kuwait Air Force
- Number built: ≥632 as of April 2020

History
- Manufactured: 1995–present
- Introduction date: 1999; 2001 (Initial operating capability, IOC)
- First flight: 29 November 1995; 30 years ago
- Developed from: McDonnell Douglas F/A-18 Hornet
- Variant: Boeing EA-18G Growler

The Boeing F/A-18E and F/A-18F Super Hornet are a series of American supersonic twin-engine, carrier-capable, multirole fighter aircraft derived from the McDonnell Douglas F/A-18 Hornet. The Super Hornet is in service with the armed forces of the United States, Australia, and Kuwait. The F/A-18E single-seat and F tandem-seat variants are larger and more advanced versions of the F/A-18C and D Hornet, respectively.

A strike fighter capable of air-to-air and air-to-ground/surface missions, the Super Hornet has an internal 20 mm M61A2 rotary cannon and can carry air-to-air missiles, air-to-surface missiles, and a variety of other weapons. Additional fuel can be carried in up to five external fuel tanks and the aircraft can be configured as an airborne tanker by adding an external air-to-air refueling system. Designed and initially produced by McDonnell Douglas, the Super Hornet first flew in 1995. Low-rate production began in early 1997, reaching full-rate production in September 1997, after the merger of McDonnell Douglas and Boeing the previous month. An electronic warfare variant, the EA-18G Growler, was also developed. Although officially named "Super Hornet", it is commonly referred to as "Rhino" within the United States Navy.

The Super Hornet entered fleet service with the U.S. Navy in 1999, supplanting the Grumman F-14 Tomcat, which was retired in 2006; the Super Hornet has served alongside the original Hornet as well. The F/A-18E/F became the backbone of U.S. carrier aviation since the 2000s and has been used extensively in combat operations in the Middle East, including the wars in Afghanistan and Iraq, and against the Islamic State and Assad-aligned forces in Syria. The Royal Australian Air Force (RAAF), which operated the F/A-18A as its main fighter since 1984, ordered the F/A-18F in 2007 to replace its aging General Dynamics F-111C fleet with the RAAF Super Hornets entering service in December 2010. The Super Hornet is planned to be replaced by the F/A-XX in U.S. Navy service starting in the 2030s.

== Development ==
=== Origins ===
The Super Hornet is an enlarged redesign of the McDonnell Douglas F/A-18 Hornet. The wing and tail configuration trace its origin to a Northrop prototype aircraft, the P-530, c. 1965, which began as a rework of the lightweight Northrop F-5E (with a larger wing, twin tail fins and a distinctive leading edge root extension, or LERX). Later flying as the Northrop YF-17 "Cobra", it competed in the United States Air Force's Lightweight Fighter (LWF) program to produce a smaller and simpler fighter to complement the larger McDonnell Douglas F-15 Eagle; the YF-17 lost the competition to the YF-16 for the Air Force's LWF, but the Navy found the twin-engine YF-17 design to be more suitable for carrier operations for the service's Navy Air Combat Fighter (NACF) and selected it over the competing naval YF-16 derivative proposal.

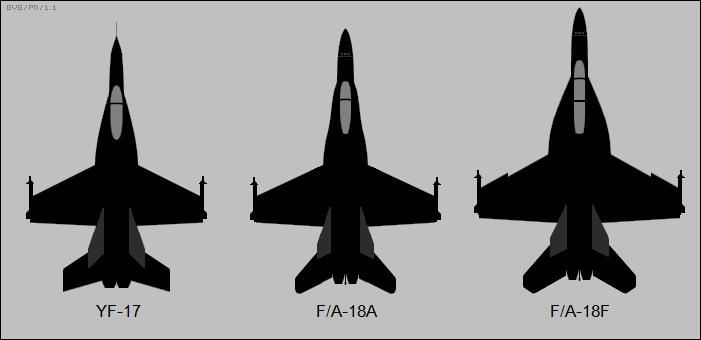
(Left to right) Northrop YF-17, McDonnell Douglas F/A-18, Boeing F/A-18E/F Super Hornet

After selecting the YF-17, the Navy directed that it be redesigned into the larger F/A-18 Hornet to meet a requirement for a multi-role fighter (VFAX) to complement the larger and more expensive Grumman F-14 Tomcat serving in fleet defense interceptor and air superiority roles. Northrop teamed with McDonnell Douglas to navalize the design, with the latter eventually becoming the prime contractor. The Hornet proved to be effective but limited in combat radius. The concept of an enlarged Hornet was first proposed in the 1980s, which was marketed by McDonnell Douglas as "Hornet 2000". The "Hornet 2000" concept was an advanced F/A-18 with a larger wing and a longer fuselage to carry more fuel and more powerful engines.

The end of the Cold War led to a period of military budget cuts and considerable restructuring. At the same time, U.S. Naval Aviation faced a number of problems. The McDonnell Douglas A-12 Avenger II Advanced Tactical Aircraft (ATA) was canceled in 1991 after the program ran into serious problems; it was intended to replace the obsolete Grumman A-6 Intruder. The Navy then embarked on another attack aircraft program called the Advanced-Attack (A-X), but also considered updating an existing design for an interim capability until A-X could be fielded. Meanwhile, McDonnell Douglas had proposed the "Super Hornet" (initially "Hornet II" and later "Hornet 2000" in the 1980s), which could serve as an alternate replacement for the A-6 Intruder or an interim aircraft for A-X; the design would also address some of the limitations of the previous F/A-18 models, such as insufficient bringback capability, or the ability to recover unused weapons aboard aircraft carriers. The next-generation Hornet design proved more attractive than Grumman's Quick Strike upgrade to the F-14 Tomcat, which was regarded as an insufficient technological leap over existing F-14s and was opposed by the Secretary of Defense Dick Cheney. Furthermore, the A-X, which had evolved into the A/F-X (Advanced Attack/Fighter) due to added fighter capabilities, was canceled in the 1993 Bottom-Up Review as the Super Hornet was viewed as a more attractive low-risk approach to a clean-sheet design due to post-Cold War budget reductions.

At the time, the Grumman F-14 Tomcat was the Navy's primary air superiority fighter and fleet defense interceptor. Cheney described the F-14 as 1960s technology, and drastically cut back F-14D procurement in 1989 before cancelling production altogether in 1991, in favor of the updated F/A-18E/F. The decision to replace the Tomcat with an all-Hornet Carrier Air Wing was controversial; Vietnam War ace and Congressman Duke Cunningham criticized the Super Hornet as an unproven design that compromised air superiority. Between 1991 and 1992, the Navy gradually canceled the Navy Advanced Tactical Fighter (NATF), which would have been a navalized variant of the Air Force's Lockheed Martin F-22 Raptor to complement the A-12, due to escalating costs. As a cheaper alternative to NATF, Grumman proposed substantial improvements to the F-14 beyond Quick Strike, but Congress rejected them as too costly and reaffirmed its commitment to the less expensive F/A-18E/F. Originally viewed as an interim for A-X or A/F-X, the Super Hornet would become the mainstay of the Carrier Air Wing.

=== Testing and production ===
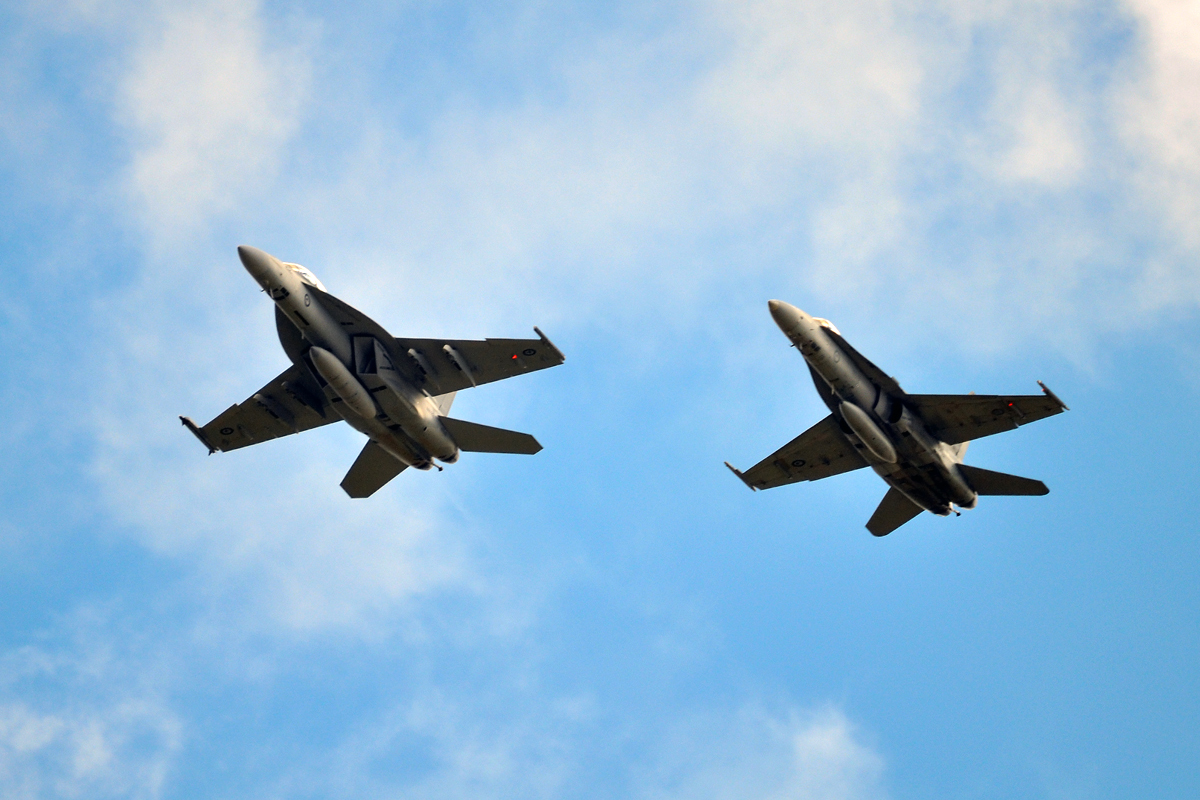
F/A-18F Super Hornet (left) and a F/A-18A Hornet (right)

The Super Hornet was first ordered by the U.S. Navy in 1992, and the total Engineering and Manufacturing Development (EMD) cost was capped at $4.88 billion in FY 1990 dollars (~$10.6 billion in 2025). The Navy retained the F/A-18 designation to help sell the program to Congress as a low-risk "derivative", though the Super Hornet is largely a new aircraft. To some extent, the design of the F/A-18E/F was driven by a more cautious development approach favoring incremental improvements over the F/A-18C/D, affordability, and reliability at the expense of raw performance. The Hornet and Super Hornet share many characteristics, including avionics, ejection seats, radar, armament, mission computer software, and maintenance/operating procedures. The Super Hornet's F414 engines were derived from the Hornet's F404 while also incorporating advances developed for the A-12's F412. The initial F/A-18E/F retained most of the avionics systems from the F/A-18C/D's configuration at the time to reduce upfront development costs. The design would be expanded in the Super Hornet with an empty weight slightly greater than the F-15C. The division of manufacturing would largely mirror the Hornet's, with McDonnell Douglas (later Boeing) responsible for the forward fuselage, wings, and stabilators while Northrop Grumman produced the center/aft fuselage and vertical tails. The design service life was 6,000 flight hours.

The Super Hornet first flew on 29 November 1995. Initial production on the F/A-18E/F began in 1995. Flight testing started in 1996 with the F/A-18E/F's first carrier landing in 1997. Low-rate production began in March 1997 with full production beginning in September 1997. Testing continued through 1999, finishing with sea trials and aerial refueling demonstrations, as well as design modifications to resolve "wing drop" and possible stores release interference. Testing involved 3,100 test flights covering 4,600 flight hours. The Super Hornet underwent U.S. Navy operational tests and evaluations in 1999, and was approved in February 2000.

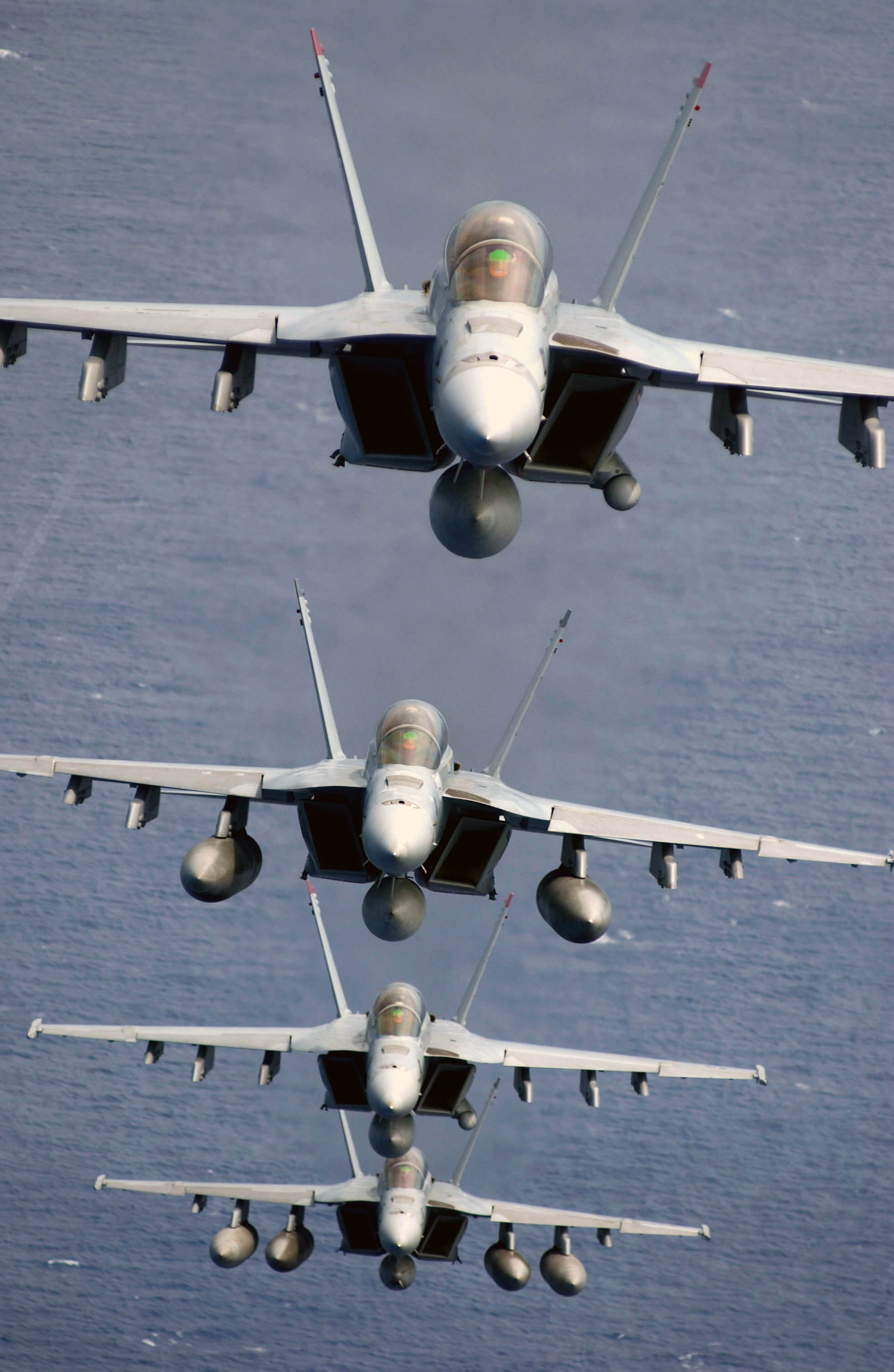
Four F/A-18Fs of VFA-41 "Black Aces" in a trail formation. The first and third aircraft have AN/ASQ-228 ATFLIR pods, and the last aircraft has a buddy store tank

Following the retirement of the F-14 in 2006, all of the Navy's combat jets were Hornet variants until the F-35C Lightning II entered service. The F/A-18E single-seat and F/A-18F two-seat aircraft took the place of the F-14 Tomcat, A-6 Intruder, Lockheed S-3 Viking, and KA-6D aircraft. An electronic warfare variant, the EA-18G Growler, replaced the EA-6B Prowler. The Navy calls this reduction in aircraft types a "neck-down". During the Vietnam War era, the Super Hornet's roles were performed by a combination of the A-1/A-4/A-7 (light attack), A-6 (medium attack), F-8/F-4 (fighter), RA-5C (recon), KA-3/KA-6 (tanker), and EA-6 (electronic warfare). It was anticipated that $1 billion in fleetwide annual savings would result from replacing other types with the Super Hornet. The Navy considers the Super Hornet's acquisition a success, meeting cost, schedule, and weight (400 lb, 181 kg) below requirement threshold limits.

The total Super Hornet procurement number would fluctuate considerably throughout its production run. The 1997 Department of Defense (DoD) Quadrennial Defense Review cut the originally planned number of around 1,000 by nearly half. By October 2008, Boeing had delivered 367 Super Hornets to the U.S. Navy, but the service was still experiencing a strike fighter shortfall as older aircraft types retired and the procurement rate was not sufficient to replenish the carrier air wings, especially with ongoing combat operations in Iraq and Afghanistan as well as substantial delays with the F-35 program. In 2006, the Navy was 60 fighters below its validated requirement. The FY2010 budget bill authorized a multiyear purchase agreement for additional Super Hornets, finalized on 28 September 2010, that reportedly saved $600 million over individual yearly contracts. This contract for 66 Super Hornets and 58 Growlers was intended to mitigate a four-year delay in the F-35 program. In 2019, Boeing received a $4 billion contract to deliver 78 Block III Super Hornets for the Navy through fiscal 2021. The Navy plans to sign year-to-year contracts to convert all of its Block II aircraft to Block III variants through 2033. As the F-35 began entering service, Boeing announced plans to end Super Hornet production in 2025, later extended to 2027 with an additional 17 orders from the U.S. Navy.

=== Improvements and changes ===
The Block II Super Hornet incorporates an improved active electronically scanned array (AESA) radar, larger displays, the joint helmet mounted cueing system, and several other avionics replacements. Avionics and weapons systems that were under development for the prospective production version of the Boeing X-32 were used on the Block II Super Hornet. New-build aircraft received the APG-79 AESA radar beginning in 2005. In January 2008, it was announced that 135 earlier production aircraft were to be retrofitted with AESA radars.

In 2008, Boeing discussed the development of a Super Hornet Block III with the U.S. and Australian military, featuring additional stealth capabilities and extended range. The airframe is strengthened to increase service life to 10,000 flight hours, and some Block II aircraft can be modified to achieve this as well. In 2010, Boeing offered prospective Super Hornet customers the "International Roadmap", which included conformal fuel tanks, enhanced engines, an enclosed weapons pod (EWP), a next-generation cockpit, a new missile warning system, and an internal infrared search and track (IRST) system; the IRST was later mounted on the centerline external tank. The EWP has four internal stations for munitions, a single aircraft can carry a total of three EWPs, housing up to 12 AMRAAMs and 2 Sidewinders. The next-generation cockpit features a 19 x 11-inch touch-sensitive display. In 2011, Boeing received a US Navy contract to develop a new mission computer.

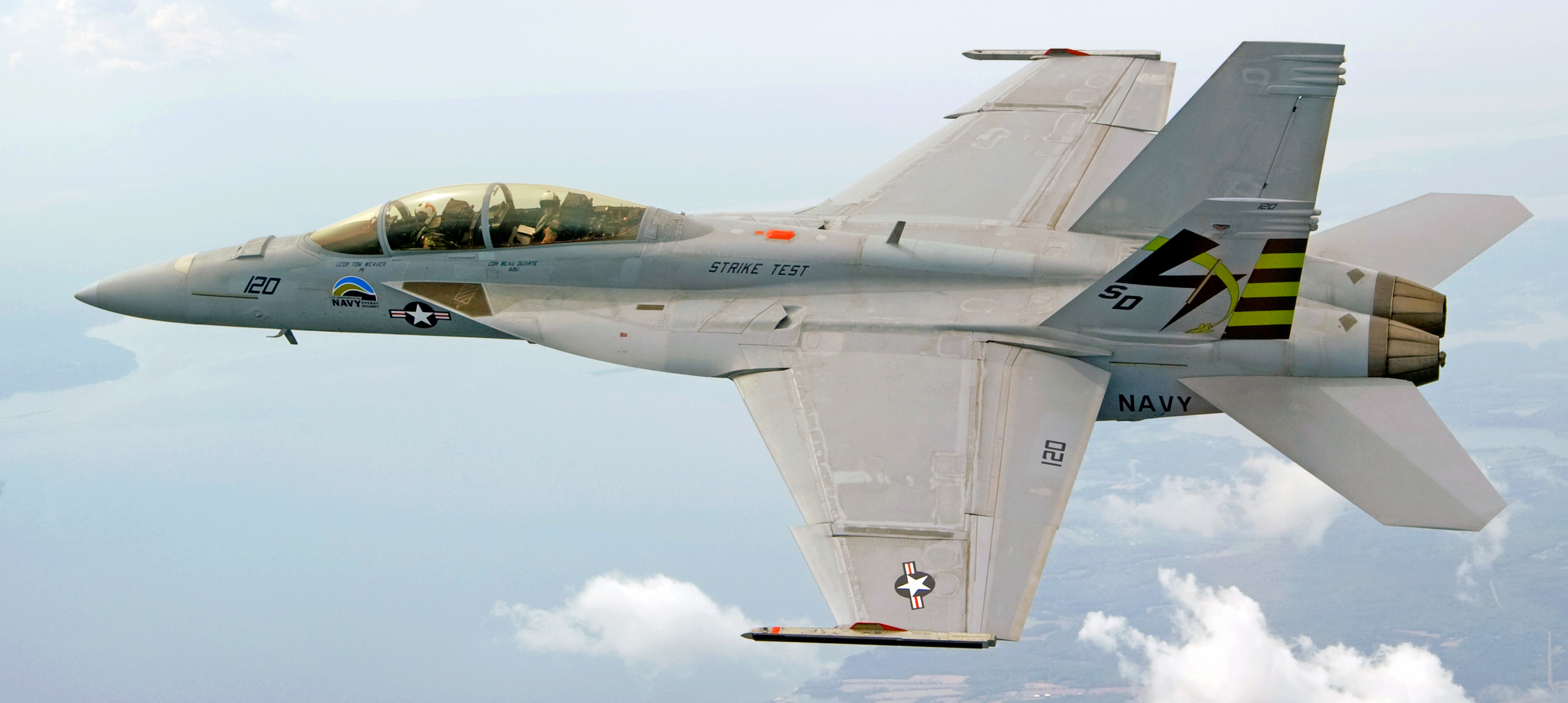
An F/A-18F named "Green Hornet", during a supersonic test flight in 2010

In 2007, Boeing stated that a passive Infrared Search and Track (IRST) sensor would be an available future option. The sensor, mounted in a modified centerline fuel tank, detects long wave IR emissions to spot and track targets such as aircraft; combat using the IRST and AIM-9X Sidewinder missiles is immune to radar jamming. In May 2009, Lockheed Martin announced its selection by Boeing for the IRST's technology development phase, and a contract followed in November 2011. As of September 2013, a basic IRST would be fielded in 2016 and a longer-range Block II version in 2019. The sensor would be designated the AN/ASG-34(V) IRST21. An F/A-18F performed a flight equipped with the IRST system in February 2014, and Milestone C approval authorizing low-rate initial production (LRIP) was granted in December 2014. The sequestration cuts in 2013 would cause years of delay, and the Navy chose to skip the basic version and transition directly to the Block II IRST for operational service. After initial production quality issues, the IRST became operational in January 2025.

==== Advanced Super Hornet ====
Boeing and Northrop Grumman self-funded a prototype of the Advanced Super Hornet. The prototype features a 50% reduction in frontal radar cross-section (RCS), conformal fuel tanks (CFT), and an enclosed weapons pod. Features could also be integrated onto the EA-18G Growler: using CFTs on the EA-18G fleet was speculated as useful for relieving underwing space and lowering the drag margin for the Next Generation Jammer. Flight tests of the Advanced Super Hornet began on 5 August 2013 and continued for three weeks, testing the performance of CFTs, the enclosed weapons pod (EWP), and signature enhancements. The U.S. Navy was reportedly pleased with the Advanced Super Hornet's flight test results, and hopes it will provide future procurement options. Although the Advanced Super Hornet was not pursued, many elements would be transferred to the Block III.

In 2013, the U.S. Navy was considering the widespread adoption of CFTs, which would allow the Super Hornet to carry 3,500 lb (1,600 kg) of additional fuel. Budgetary pressures from the F-35C Lightning II and Pacific region operations were cited as reasons supporting the use of CFTs. Flight testing demonstrated CFTs could slightly reduce drag while expanding the combat range by 260 nautical miles (300 mi; 480 km). The prototype CFT weighed 1,500 lb (680 kg), while production CFTs are expected to weigh 870 lb (390 kg). Boeing stated that the CFTs do not add any cruise drag but acknowledged a negative impact imposed on transonic acceleration due to increased wave drag. General Electric's enhanced performance engine (EPE), increasing the F414-GE-400's power output by 20%, was suggested as a mitigating measure. In 2021, the U.S. Navy halted plans to fit CFTs as standard on all Block III Super Hornets due to cost, schedule, and performance issues.

In 2009, development commenced on several engine improvements, including greater resistance to foreign object damage, reduced fuel burn rate, and potentially increased thrust of up to 20%. In 2014, Boeing revealed a Super Hornet hybrid concept, equipped with the EA-18G Growler's electronic signal detection capabilities to allow for targets engagement using the receiver; the concept did not include the ALQ-99 jamming pod. Growth capabilities could include the addition of a long-range infrared search and track sensor and new air-to-air tracking modes.

== Design ==
=== Overview ===
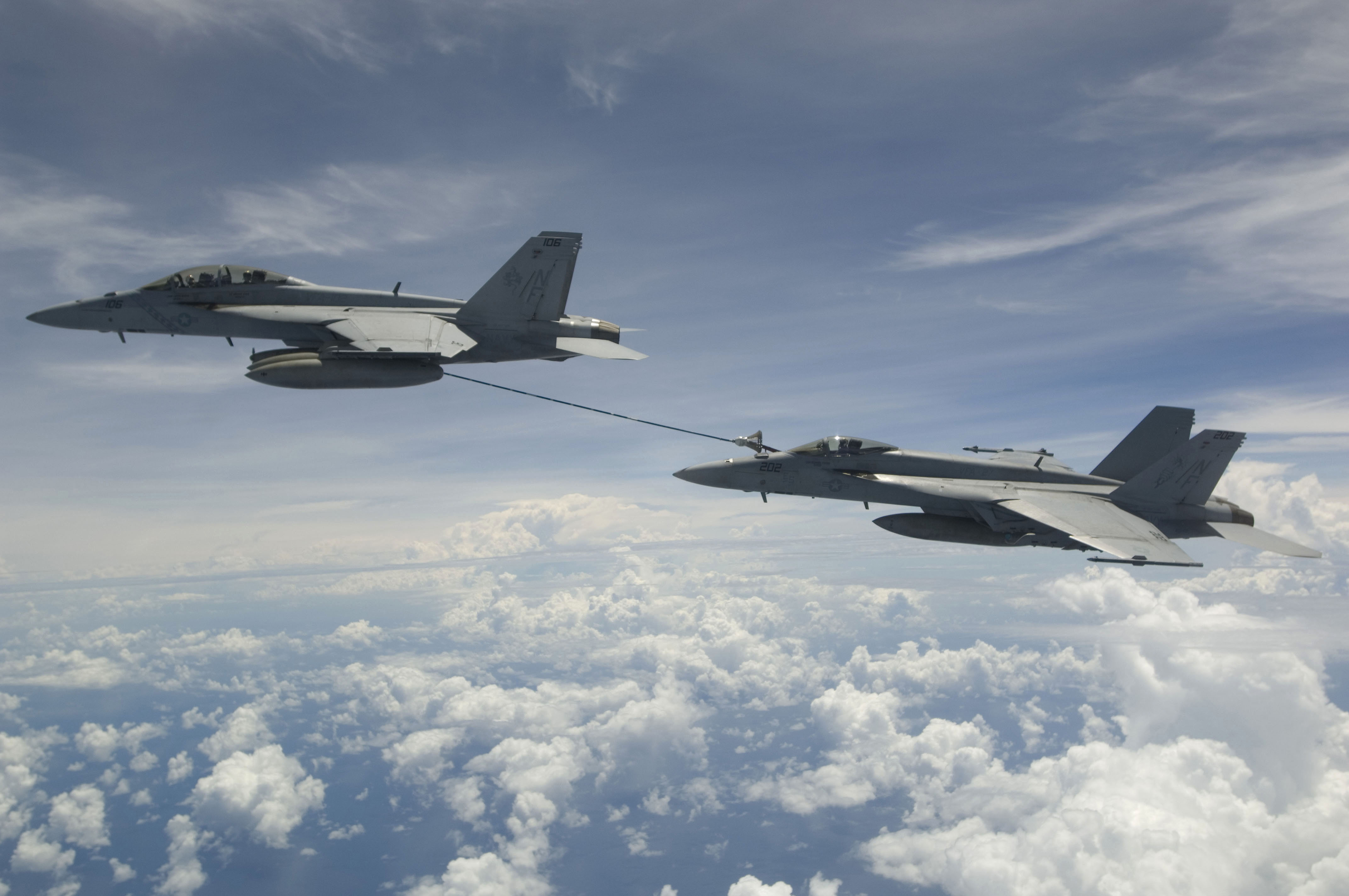
An F/A-18F refueling an F/A-18E over the Bay of Bengal, 2007

The Super Hornet is largely a new aircraft at about 20% larger, 7,000 lb (3,200 kg) heavier empty weight, and 15,000 lb (6,800 kg) heavier maximum weight than the original Hornet. The Super Hornet carries 33% more internal fuel, increasing mission range by 41% and endurance by 50% over the "Legacy" Hornet. The empty weight of the Super Hornet is about 11,000 lb (5,000 kg) less than that of the F-14 Tomcat which it replaced, while approaching, but not matching, the F-14's payload and range. (Note: "It (Super Hornet) has only 36 percent of the F-14's payload/range capability.")

Although lacking some of the F-14's raw performance, the F/A-18E/F has much better handling characteristics and controllability and was also significantly more reliable and affordable to operate. With the Super Hornet being significantly heavier than the legacy Hornet, the catapult and arresting systems must be set differently. To aid safe flight operations and prevent confusion in radio calls, the Super Hornet is informally referred to as the "Rhino" to distinguish it from earlier Hornets partly because of the AN/APX-111 "pizza box" IFF antenna protruding on top of the nose. (The "Rhino" nickname was previously applied to the McDonnell Douglas F-4 Phantom II, which was retired from US Navy combat use in 1987.)

The Super Hornet, unlike the previous Hornet, can be equipped with an aerial refueling system (ARS) or "buddy store" for the refueling of other aircraft, filling the tactical airborne tanker role the Navy had lost with the retirement of the KA-6D and Lockheed S-3B Viking tankers. The ARS includes an external 330 US gal (1,200 L) tank with hose reel on the centerline, along with four external 480 US gal (1,800 L) tanks and internal tanks, for a total of 29,000 lb (13,000 kg) of fuel on the aircraft. On typical missions a fifth of the air wing is dedicated to the tanker role, which consumes aircraft fatigue life expectancy faster than other missions. It most commonly uses JP-5 jet fuel.

=== Airframe changes ===
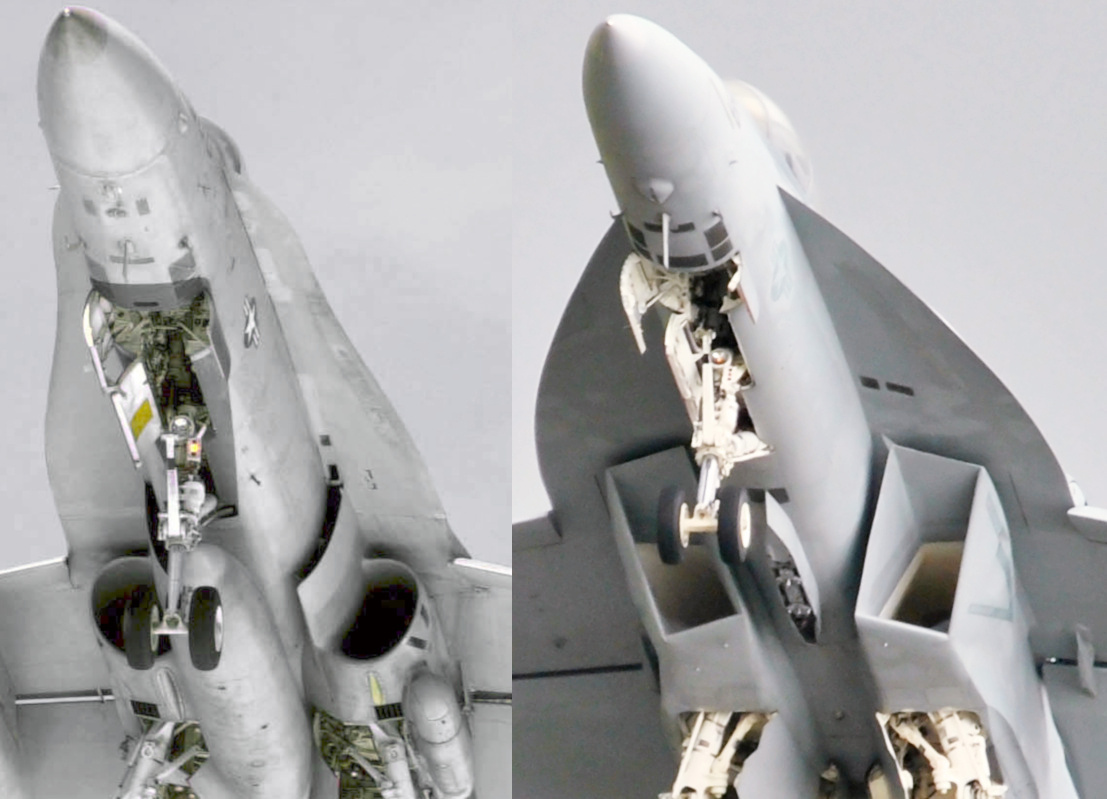
Hornet's oval pitot air intakes vs. Super Hornet's rectangular caret intakes, both with fixed intake ramps

The forward fuselage is unchanged, but the remainder of the aircraft shares little with earlier F/A-18C/D models. The fuselage was stretched by 34 in (86 cm) to make room for fuel and future avionics upgrades and increased the wing area by 25%, yet the Super Hornet has 42% fewer structural parts than the original Hornet. The wings have a dogtooth extension and a strip of porous surface at the folding joint to mitigate "wing drop". (Note: Wing drop is an uncommanded roll that can occur during transonic maneuvering.) The General Electric F414 engine, developed from the Hornet's F404, has 35% additional thrust over most of the flight envelope and is rated at 22,000 lbf (98 kN) in afterburner. The Super Hornet can return to an aircraft carrier with a larger load of unspent fuel and munitions than the Hornet; this ability is known as "bringback", which for the Super Hornet is in excess of 9,000 lb (4,100 kg).

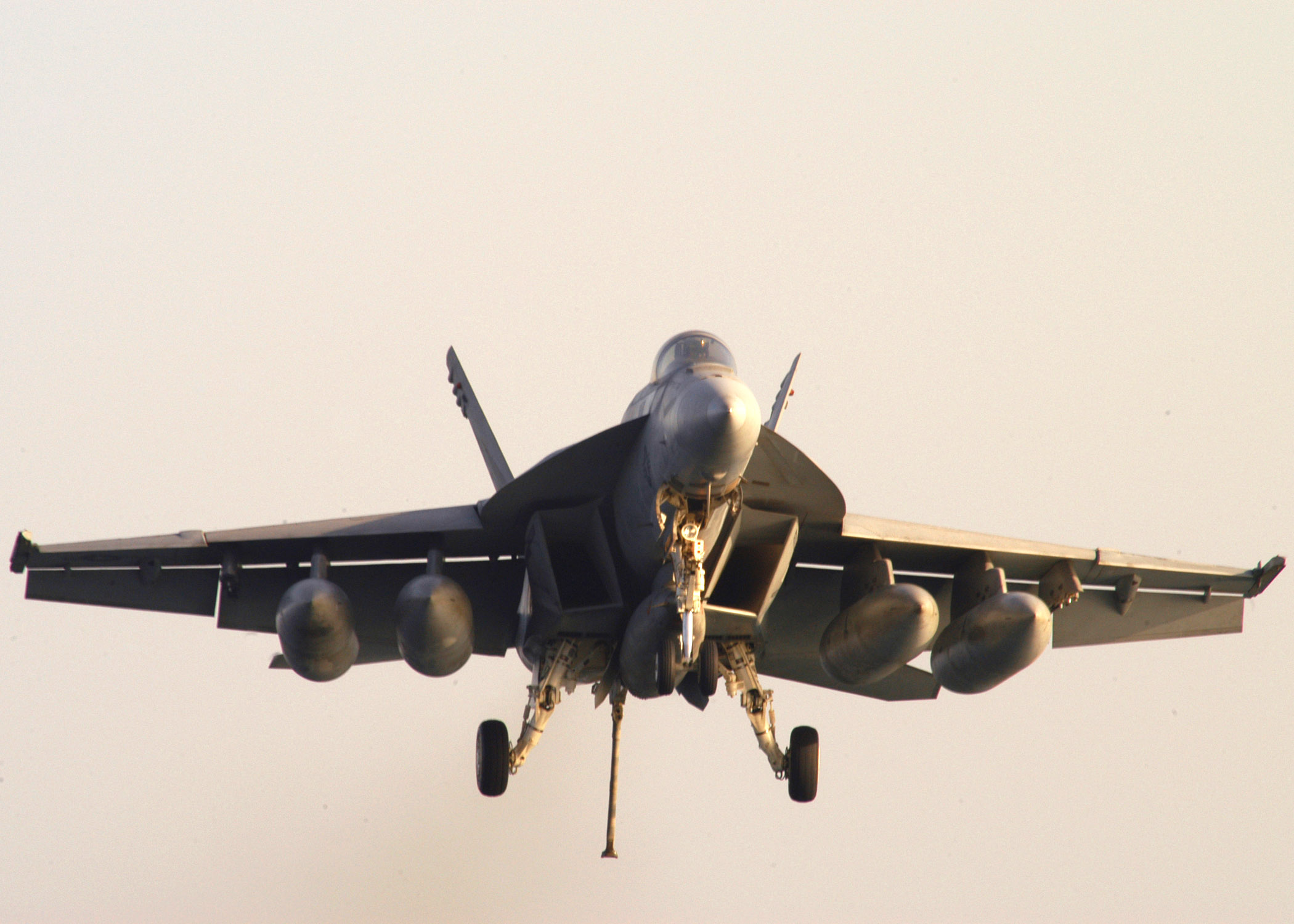
The outward canting of the underwing pylons is apparent in this photo of a U.S. Navy F/A-18E on landing approach

Other differences include larger rectangular caret inlets with fixed ramps for the more powerful engines and two extra wing hard points for payload (for a total of 11), retaining previous hardpoints on the bottom centerline, wingtips, and two conformal fuselage positions. Among the most significant aerodynamic changes are the enlarged leading edge extensions (LEX) that provide improved vortex lifting characteristics in high angle of attack maneuvers, and reduce the static stability margin to enhance pitching characteristics. This modification results in pitch rates in excess of 40 degrees per second, and high resistance to departure from controlled flight. The recontoured LEX also eliminated the need for the vented slots. Due to concerns over released stores potentially striking the airframe from early wind tunnel testing, all underwing pylons are canted outwards slightly; although this was later determined to be unnecessary, production tooling had already been adjusted so the canted pylons remained to save development costs and avoid revalidating all flight testing. While the effects are marginal for cruise drag, they are more substantial for transonic and supersonic drag.

=== Radar signature reduction measures ===
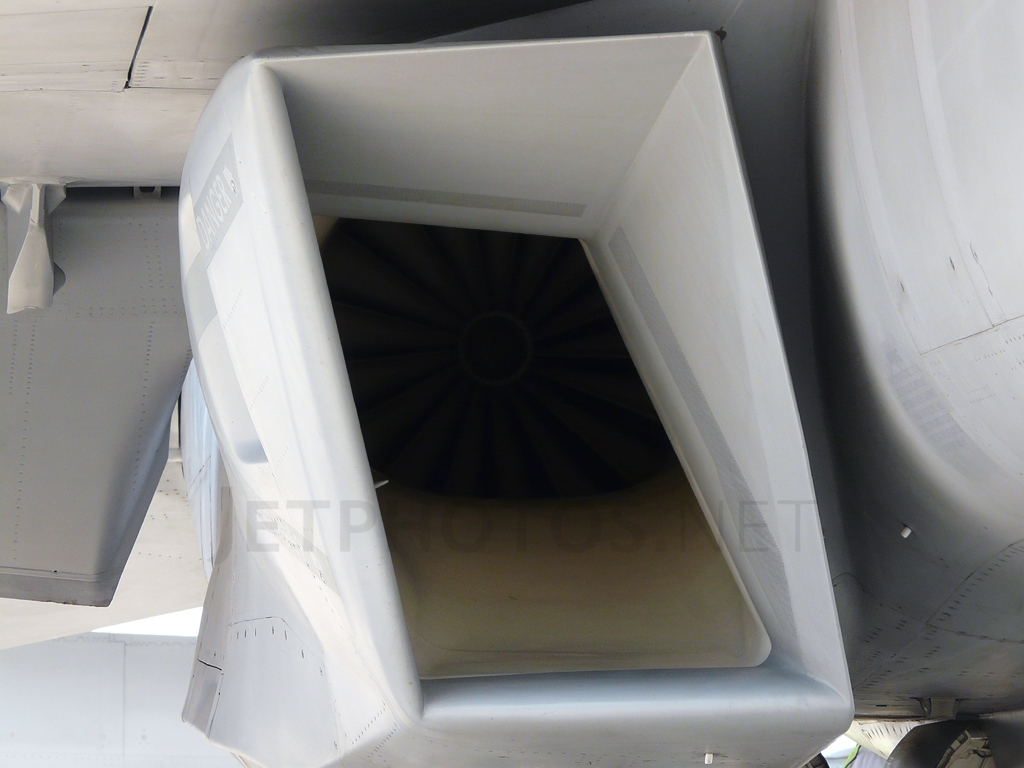

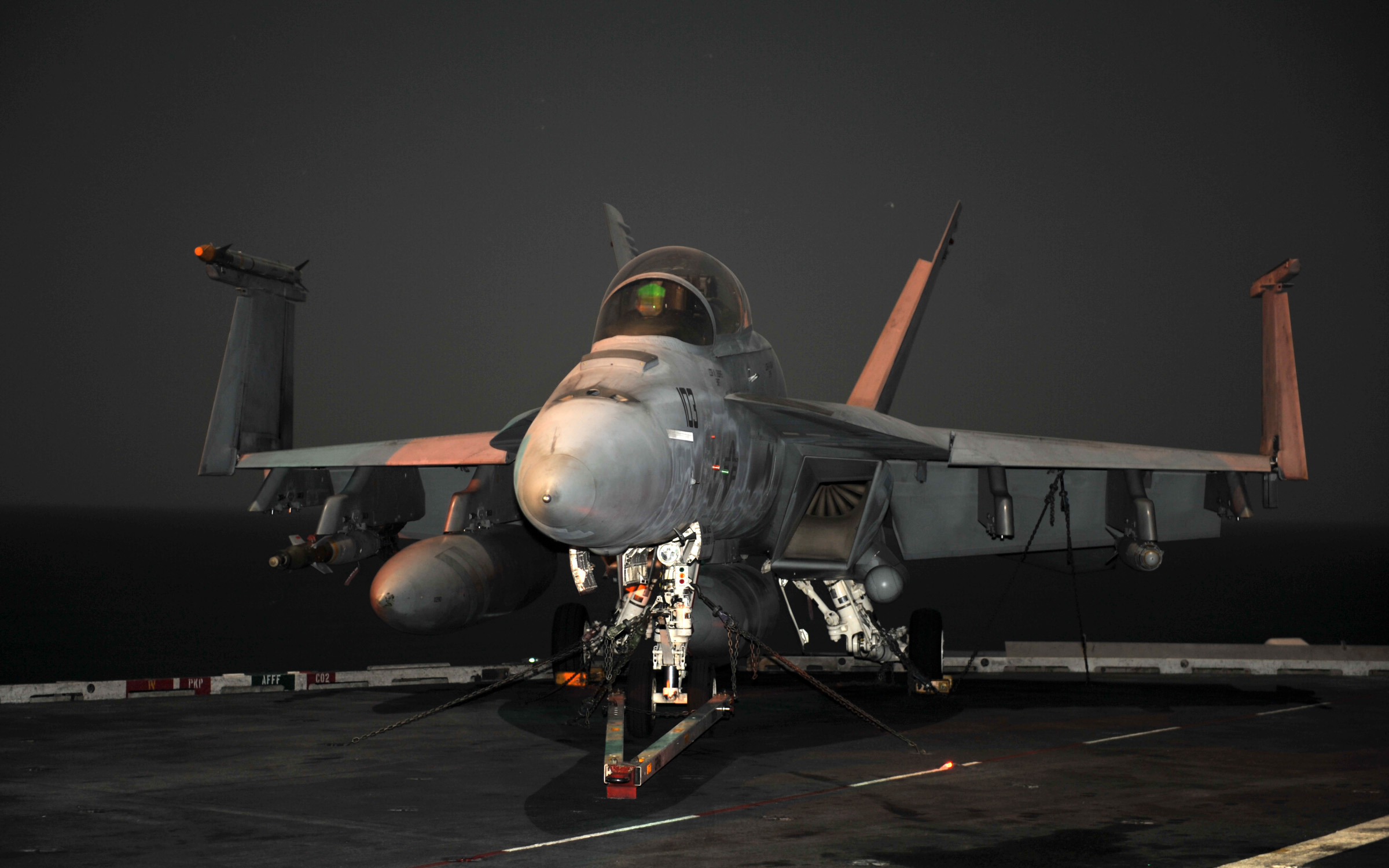
The S-duct-like air intake partially conceals engine blades from radar waves.

Survivability is a key feature of the Super Hornet. The U.S. Navy took a "balanced approach" to survivability in its design. It does not rely primarily on low-observability technology, but rather adopts improvements to its radar signature alongside other innovations; incorporating more advanced electronic warfare capabilities, reduced ballistic vulnerability, and greater employment of standoff weapons to collectively enhance crew and aircraft safety. While the F/A-18E/F is not a stealth fighter like the F-22, it does have a frontal radar cross-section (RCS) an order of magnitude smaller than prior generation fighters. Additional changes for reducing RCS can be installed on an as-needed basis.

The F/A-18E/F's RCS is reduced greatly from some aspects, mainly the front and rear. The design of the caret engine inlets reduces the aircraft's frontal radar cross-section, with the alignment of the leading edges of the inlets designed to scatter radiation to the sides. Fixed fanlike reflecting structures in the inlet tunnel divert radar energy away from the rotating fan blades. The Super Hornet also makes considerable use of panel joint serration and edge alignment to direct reflected waves away from the aircraft in uniformly narrow angles. Considerable attention is paid to the removal or filling of unnecessary surface join gaps and resonant cavities. Where the F/A-18A-D used grilles to cover various accessory exhaust and inlet ducts, the F/A-18E/F uses perforated panels that appear opaque to radar waves at the frequencies used.

=== Avionics ===
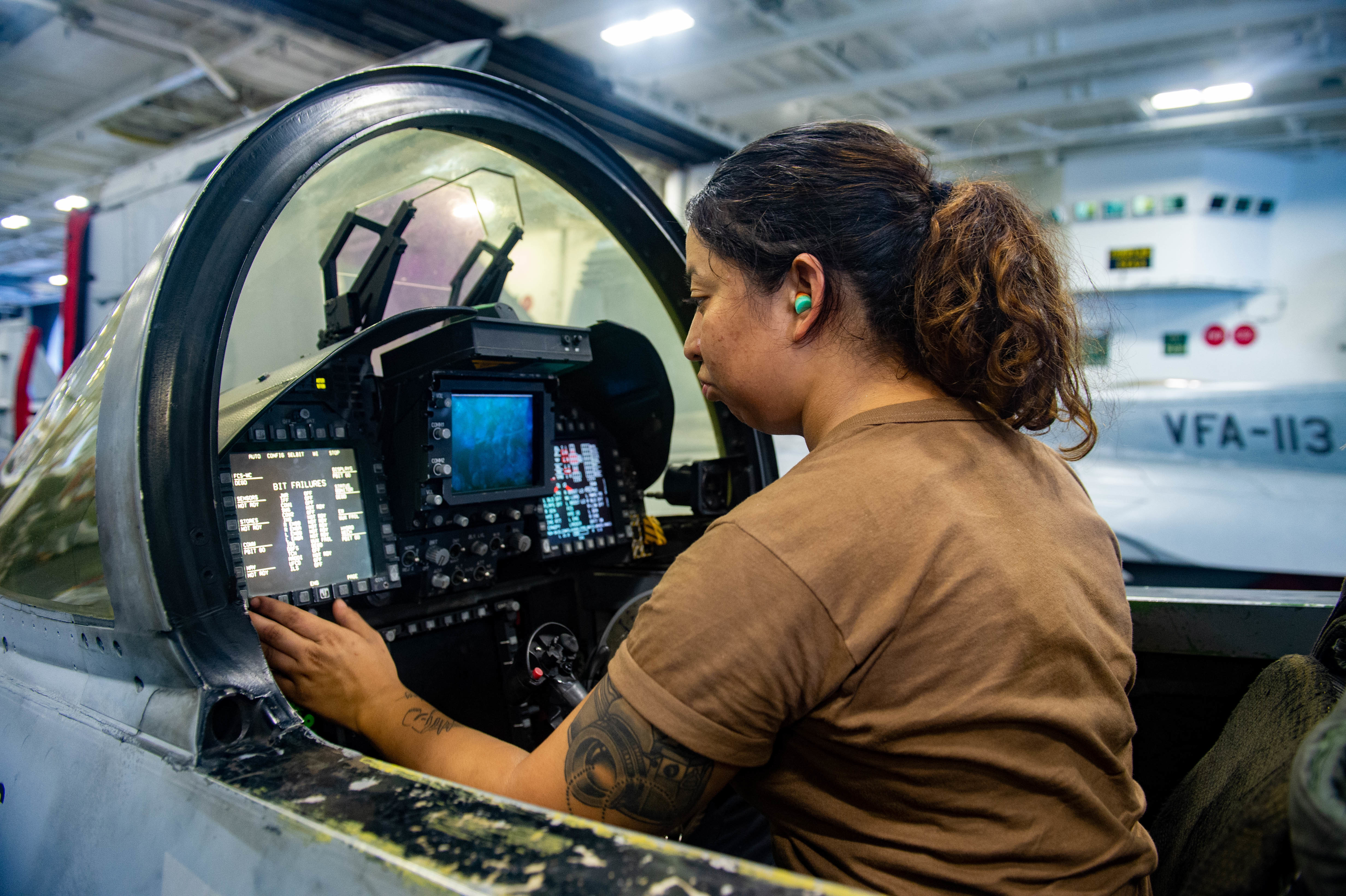
Aboard USS Carl Vinson, a mechanic performs system checks from the cockpit of a U.S. Navy F/A-18F with three multifunction displays.

Initially, the Super Hornet's avionics and software had a 90% commonality with that of the F/A-18C/D fleet at the time, with further upgraded avionics introduced in successive Blocks. Differences include an up-front touchscreen control display; a large multipurpose color liquid-crystal display; and a fuel display. The Super Hornet has a quadruplex digital fly-by-wire system, as well as a digital flight-control system that detects and corrects for battle damage. Initial production models used the APG-73 radar, later replaced by the AN/APG-79 active electronically scanned array (AESA). The AN/ASQ-228 ATFLIR (Advanced Targeting Forward Looking InfraRed), is the main electro-optical sensor and laser designator pod for the Super Hornet. The communications equipment consist of an AN/ARC-210 VHF/UHF radio and a MIDS-JTRS low volume terminal for HAVE QUICK, SINCGARS and Link 16 connectivity.

The defensive countermeasures of Block I aircraft includes the AN/ALR-67(V)3 radar warning receiver, the AN/ALE-47 countermeasures dispenser, the AN/ALE-50 towed decoy and the AN/ALQ-165 Airborne Self-Protect Jammer (ASPJ). Block II aircraft replace the ALQ-165 with the AN/ALQ-214 Integrated Defensive Countermeasures (IDECM) system, consisting of internally mounted threat receivers and optional self-protection jammers. Interior and exterior lighting on the Block II was changed to allow the use of night vision devices. The older ALE-50 decoys are being replaced by ALE-55 towed decoys, which can transmit jamming signals based on data received from the IDECM.

Beginning in 2005, Block II aircraft were fitted with the AN/APG-79 AESA radar, capable of executing simultaneous air-to-air and air-to-ground attacks, and providing higher quality high-resolution ground mapping at long standoff ranges. The AESA radar can also detect smaller targets, such as inbound missiles and can track air targets beyond the range of the aircraft's air-to-air missiles. VFA-213, the first squadron to fly AESA-equipped Super Hornets, became "safe for flight" (independently fly and maintain the F/A-18F) on 27 October 2006. The first Super Hornet upgraded with the Joint Helmet Mounted Cueing System (JHMCS) was delivered to VFA-213 on 18 May 2007. The JHMCS provides multi-purpose situational awareness, which includes high-off-boresight missile cuing. The Shared Reconnaissance Pod (SHARP) is a high-resolution, digital tactical aerial reconnaissance system that features advanced day/night and all-weather capability. The Multifunctional Information Distribution System low volume communication terminal is being upgraded with the MIDS-JTRS system, which will allow a tenfold increase in bandwidth as well as compatibility with the Joint Tactical Radio System standards.

The avionics of Block III aircraft, first delivered in 2021, incorporates an improved cockpit with all MFDs replaced by a large-area 10 in × 19 in (25 cm × 48 cm) touchscreen display, updated integration and targeting networks, an updated processor, and an open mission systems architecture. Block II aircraft can be upgraded to the Block III configuration. For passive infrared detection and targeting, the aircraft can carry the AN/ASG-34(V)1 IRST21 sensor contained in a modified centerline FPU-13 external fuel tank; the sensor occupies the forward portion of the tank, reducing its capacity to 340 gallons. The ATFLIR is planned to be replaced by the AN/AAQ-28(V) Litening targeting pod.

== Operational history ==
=== United States Navy ===
In 1999, the Super Hornet entered fleet service with the U.S. Navy. It achieved initial operating capability (IOC) in September 2001 with the U.S. Navy's Strike Fighter Squadron 115 (VFA-115) at Naval Air Station Lemoore, California. VFA-115 was also the first unit to take their F/A-18s into combat. On 6 November 2002, two F/A-18Es conducted a "Response Option" strike in support of Operation Southern Watch on two surface-to-air missile launchers at Al Kut, Iraq and an air defense command and control bunker at Tallil air base. One of the pilots dropped 2,000 lb (910 kg) JDAM bombs from the Super Hornet for the first time during combat.

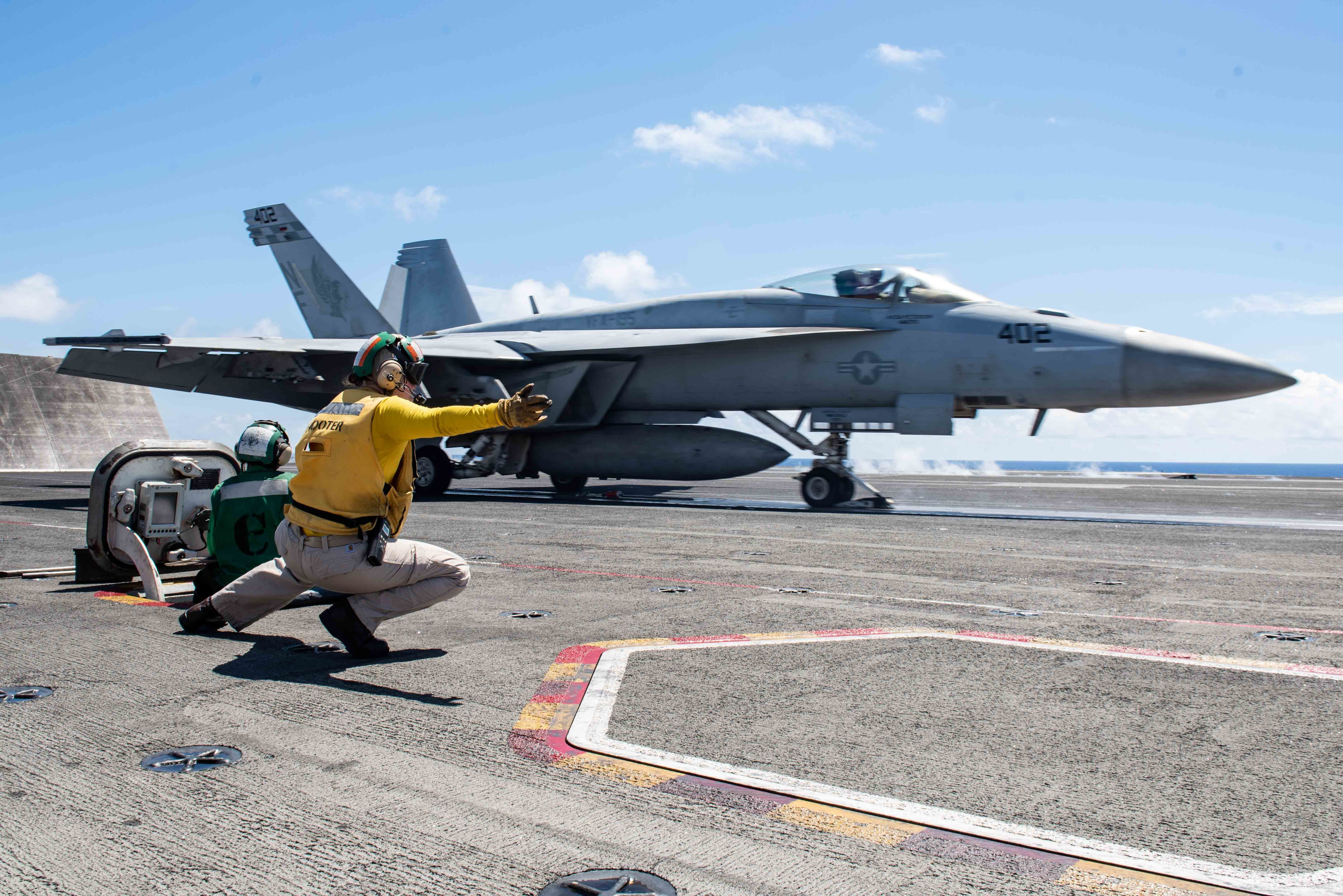
F/A-18E taking off from the USS Ronald Reagan

In support of Operation Iraqi Freedom (Iraq War), VFA-14, VFA-41 and VFA-115 flew close air support, strike, escort, SEAD and aerial refueling sorties. Two F/A-18Es from VFA-14 and two F/A-18Fs from VFA-41 were forward deployed to Abraham Lincoln. The VFA-14 aircraft flew mostly as aerial refuelers and the VFA-41 fighters as Forward Air Controller (Airborne) or FAC(A)s. On 6 April 2005, VFA-154 and VFA-147 (the latter squadron then still operating F/A-18Cs) dropped two 500-pound (230 kg) laser-guided bombs on an enemy insurgent location east of Baghdad. On 8 September 2006, VFA-211 F/A-18Fs expended GBU-12 and GBU-38 bombs against Taliban fighters and Taliban fortifications west and northwest of Kandahar as part of Operations Medusa and Enduring Freedom. This was the first time the unit had participated in an active combat capacity using the Super Hornet.

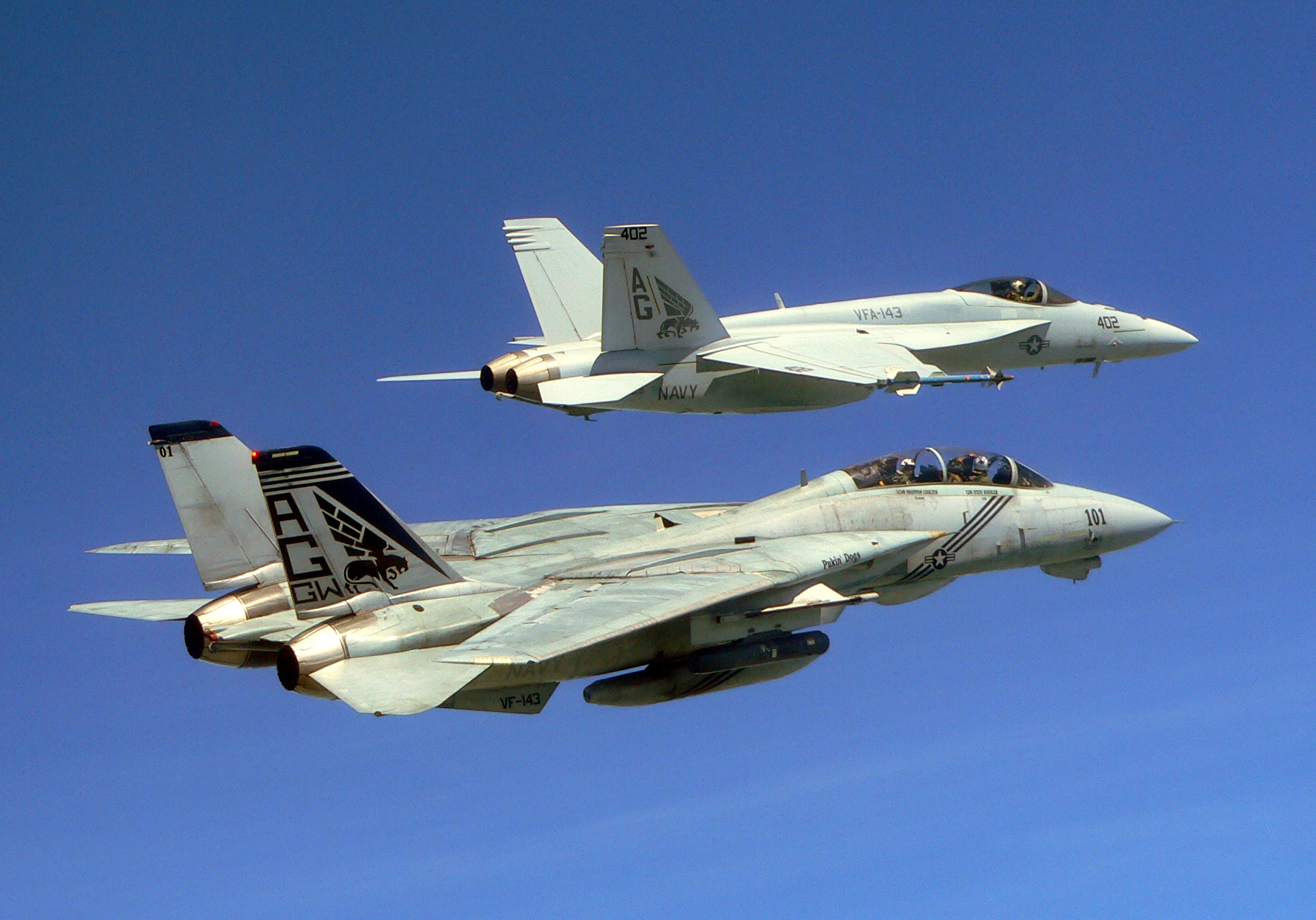
VFA-143 "Pukin Dogs" F-14B and F/A-18E in 2005

During the 2006–2007 cruise with Dwight D. Eisenhower, VFA-103 and VFA-143 supported Operations Iraqi Freedom, Enduring Freedom and operations off the Somali coast. Alongside "Legacy Hornet" squadrons, VFA-131 and VFA-83, they dropped 140 precision guided weapons and performed nearly 70 strafing runs. The Super Hornet can operate from the French aircraft carrier Charles de Gaulle.

F/A-18F take-off, in-flight refueling and landing on USS Carl Vinson

On 7 August 2014, U.S. defense officials announced they had been authorized to launch bombing missions upon Islamic State (IS) forces in northern Iraq. The decision to take direct action was made to protect U.S. personnel in the city of Irbil and to ensure the safety of transport aircraft making airdrops to Yazidi civilians. Early on 8 August, two Super Hornets took off from George H.W. Bush and dropped 500 lb laser-guided bombs on a "mobile artillery piece" the militants had been using to shell Kurdish forces defending the city. Later that day, four more aircraft struck a seven-vehicle convoy and a mortar position.

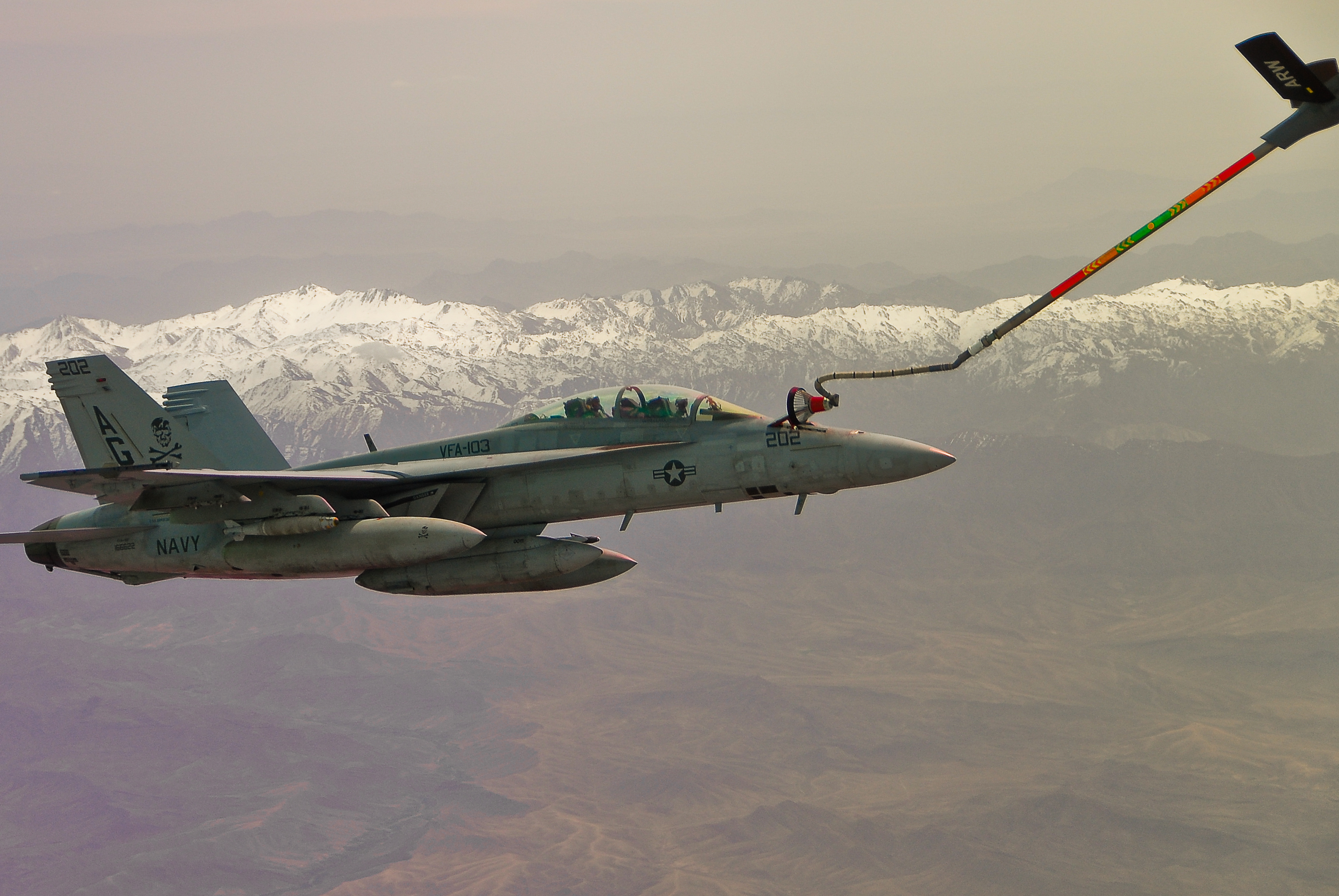
F/A-18F being refueled over Afghanistan in 2009

On 18 June 2017, a U.S. Navy F/A-18E shot down a Syrian Air Force Su-22 fighter-bomber that allegedly had bombed a position held by U.S.-supported Syrian Democratic Forces (SDF) near Tabqa; the Syrian government claimed the Su-22 was bombing an IS position. This was the first aerial kill of a crewed aircraft by an American fighter since 1999, the first by the Navy since the 1991 Persian Gulf War, the first kill by a Super Hornet, and the third kill by an F/A-18. An E-3 Sentry issued several warnings to the Su-22 and, after it dropped bombs near SDF fighters, the F/A-18E, piloted by Lieutenant Commander Michael "MOB" Tremel, a pilot assigned to Strike Fighter Squadron 87 aboard the carrier George H.W. Bush, independently chose to shoot it down based on established rules of engagement. The F/A-18E first missed with an AIM-9X Sidewinder, then hit the Su-22 with an AIM-120 AMRAAM; the encounter lasted eight minutes.

Six F/A-18 Super Hornets flying in close formation by the Blue Angels in Seattle

In 2018, Boeing was awarded a contract to convert nine single-seat F/A-18E Super Hornets and two F/A-18F two-seaters for Blue Angels use; these were to be completed by 2021.

On 26 December 2023, Super Hornets from USS Dwight D. Eisenhower, along with the accompanying destroyer USS Laboon, destroyed 12 attack drones, three anti-ship missiles and two ground attack cruise missiles fired by Houthi forces in the southern Red Sea. Around 2:30 AM local time on 12 January 2024, Houthi targets were struck by U.S. Navy, USAF, and RAF forces in response to Houthi attacks against commercial shipping in the Red Sea. Super Hornets from Dwight D. Eisenhower took part in the strikes, which in total hit 60 targets at 16 locations using over 100 PGMs of various types. On 22 December 2024, an F/A-18F Super Hornet from VFA-11 was shot down by USS Gettysburg in a friendly fire incident. Both crewmembers of the aircraft survived. On 28 April 2025 while under attack by missiles and drones from the Houthis, Harry S. Truman made a hard turn and a F/A-18E Super Hornet from VFA-136, which was being towed in the hangar, fell overboard as a result. The plane was lost at sea. On 6 May 2025 a second Super Hornet was lost when arresting gear failed to catch the plane during landing.

Iran claimed to have shot down an F/A-18 over Chabahar during Operation Epic Fury on 25 March 2026. The US CENTCOM denied the shootdown, stating that no US aircraft had been shot down by Iranian missiles. Neutral sources suggest that the F-18 was hit but was not shot down. It is not clear whether it was a F/A-18 Hornet or a F/A-18 Super Hornet.

=== Royal Australian Air Force ===
On 3 May 2007, the Australian Government signed a $2.9 billion contract to acquire 24 F/A-18Fs as an interim replacement for the Royal Australian Air Force's (RAAF) aging F-111s. It was reported that the order would also address any difficulties that might be caused by a need to quickly replace the RAAF's existing fleet of classic F/A-18A/B Hornets in the event of delays to the F-35 program. The total cost of the purchase, with training and support over 10 years, was expected to be A$6 billion (US$4.6 billion).

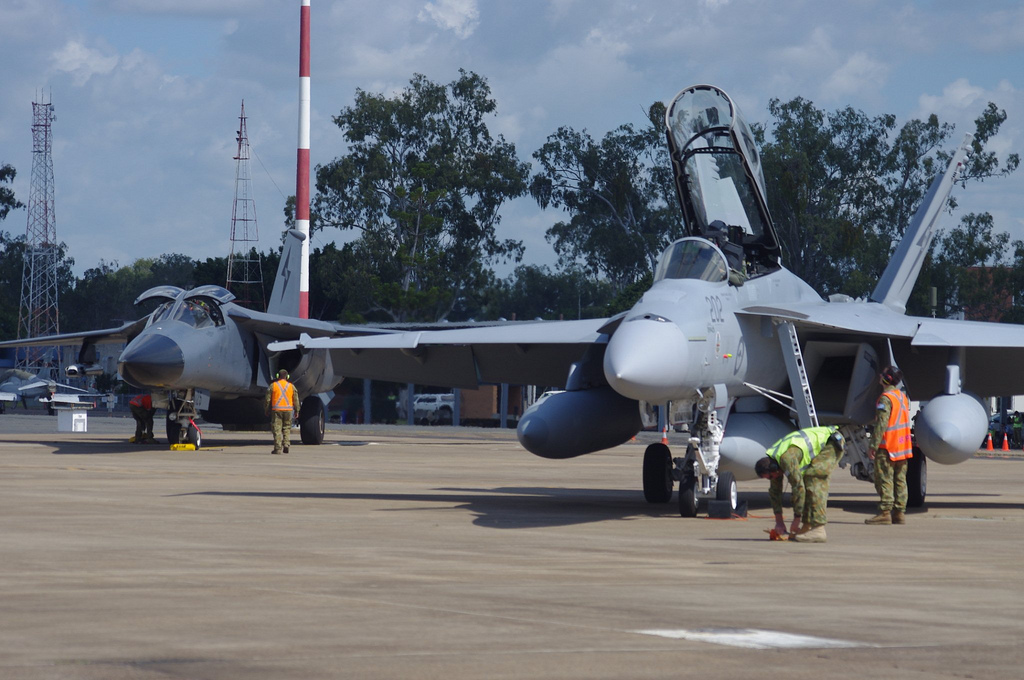
An F-111C (at left) with one of the RAAF's first two F/A-18Fs

The order was controversial; Air Vice Marshal (retired) Peter Criss, said that he was "absolutely astounded" that $6 billion would be spent on an interim aircraft, and cited the US Senate Armed Services Committee, to the effect that the "excess power" of the Block I Super Hornet was inferior to that of the MiG-29 and Su-30, both of which were being operated by, or were on order for, air forces in South East Asia. Another former senior RAAF officer, Air Commodore (ret.) Ted Bushell stated that the F/A-18F could not perform the strategic deterrent/strike role of the F-111C and the latter could continue to operate until 2020 at least. On 31 December 2007, the new Australian Labor government announced a review of the RAAF's aircraft procurement plans citing suitability concerns, the lack of a proper review process, and beliefs that an interim fighter was not needed.

On 17 March 2008, the Government announced that it would proceed to acquire 24 F/A-18Fs. Defence Minister Joel Fitzgibbon called the Super Hornet an "excellent aircraft", and indicated that costs and logistical factors contributed to the decision: the F-111's retirement was "irreversible"; "only" the F/A-18F could meet the timeframe and that termination involved "significant financial penalties and create understandable tensions between the contract partners." The Block II aircraft offered include installed engines and six spares, APG-79 AESA radars, Link 16 connectivity, LAU-127 guided missile launchers, AN/ALE-55 fiber optic towed decoys and other equipment. On 27 February 2009, Fitzgibbon announced that 12 of the 24 F/A-18Fs would be wired on the production line for future modification as Boeing EA-18G Growlers at an additional cost of A$35 million. The final decision on the EA-18G conversion, at a cost of A$300 million, would be made in 2012.

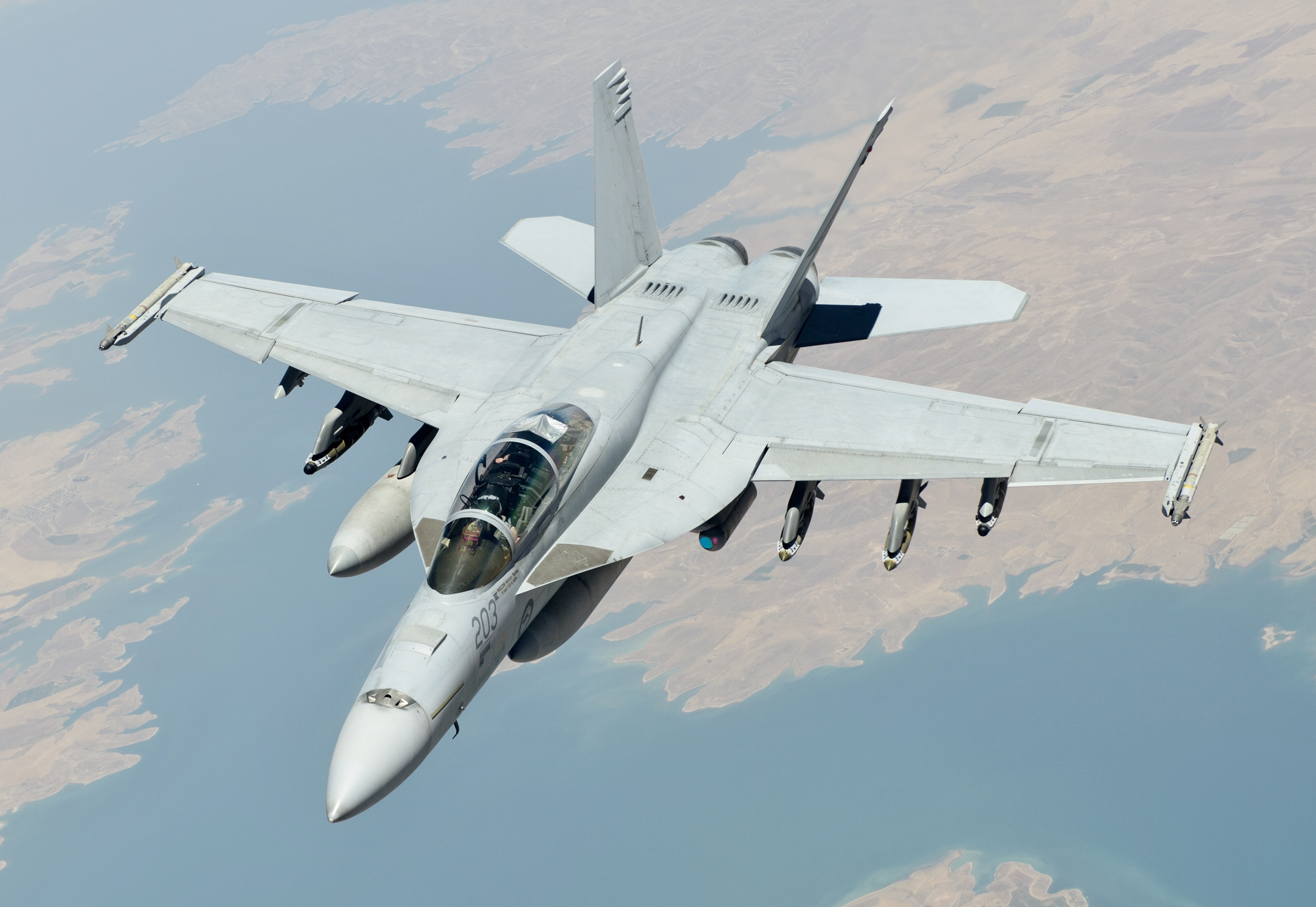
An Australian F/A-18F during a 2017 combat mission in the Middle East

The first RAAF F/A-18F made its first flight from Boeing's factory in St. Louis, Missouri, on 21 July 2009. RAAF crews began training in the U.S. in 2009. The first five F/A-18Fs arrived at their home base, RAAF Base Amberley in Queensland, on 26 March 2010; and were joined by six more aircraft on 7 July 2010. After four more aircraft arrived in December 2010, the first RAAF F/A-18F squadron was declared operational on 9 December 2010.

In 2008, U.S. export approval was sought for EA-18G Growlers. In December 2012, Australia sought cost information on acquiring a further 24 F/A-18Fs, which may be bought to avoid a capability gap due to F-35 delays. In February 2013, the U.S. Defense Security Cooperation Agency notified Congress of a possible Foreign Military Sale to Australia for up to 12 F/A-18E/Fs and 12 EA-18Gs with associated equipment, training and logistical support. In May 2013, Australia announced the order of 12 new EA-18Gs instead of converting any F/A-18Fs. In June 2014, Boeing received a contract for 12 EA-18Gs; the first was rolled out on 29 July 2015.

On 24 September 2014, eight RAAF F/A-18Fs, along with a KC-30A tanker, an early warning aircraft, and 400 personnel arrived in the United Arab Emirates to take part in operations against Islamic State (IS) militants. On 5 October 2014, the RAAF officially started combat missions over Iraq using a pair of F/A-18Fs armed with GPS guided bombs, they returned safely to base without attacking targets. On 8 October 2014, an RAAF F/A-18F conducted its first attack, dropping two bombs on an ISIL facility in northern Iraq. In 2017, EA-18Gs replaced No. 6 Squadron RAAF's F/A-18Fs, which were then transferred to No. 1 Squadron RAAF.

On 8 December 2020, F/A-18F A44-223 rolled into a ditch while attempting to take off at RAAF Base Amberley, the crew ejected. An eyewitness reportedly observed smoke from one of the engines. A day after the incident, the RAAF grounded the fleet of 24 Super Hornets and 11 Growlers while the incident was investigated. The cause was determined to be pilot error. The Super Hornet was repaired, and returned to service in mid-2021.

=== Kuwait Air Force ===
In May 2015, the Kuwait Air Force was reportedly planning to order 28 F/A-18E/Fs with options for an additional 12. However, in June 2015, it was reported that Kuwait was considering a split purchase between the Eurofighter Typhoon and the F/A-18E/F. On 11 September 2015, Kuwait signed an agreement for 28 Eurofighters. In November 2016, a proposed Kuwaiti sale of 32 F/A-18E and 8 F/A-18F fighters, armaments, and associated equipment was approved by the U.S. State Department.

In June 2018, the Kuwaiti Government ordered 22 F/A-18Es and 6 F/A-18Fs via a US$1.5 billion contract. The aircraft were scheduled to be delivered by January 2021, but were rescheduled to be delivered later due to the COVID-19 pandemic.

=== Potential operators ===
Boeing has pitched the F/A-18E/F to numerous countries, particularly those that operate the legacy Hornet as it was supposed to be a "logical progression from the Hornet to the [Super Hornet], with its logistics, weaponry and training commonalities". So far only the US Navy, Australia, and Kuwait have ordered and received the Super Hornet.

==== Malaysia ====
Boeing offered Malaysia Super Hornets as part of a buy-back package for its existing Hornets in 2002. However, the procurement was halted in 2007 after the government decided to purchase the Sukhoi Su-30MKM instead; Chief Gen. Datuk Nik Ismail Nik Mohamaed of the Royal Malaysian Air Force (RMAF) indicated that the air force had not planned to end the Super Hornet buy, stating that such fighters were needed. Separately, the Super Hornet is a contender for the MRCA program, under which the RMAF seek to equip three squadrons with 36 to 40 new fighters with an estimated budget of RM6 billion to RM8 billion (US$1.84 billion to US$2.46 billion). Other competitors are the Eurofighter Typhoon, Dassault Rafale and Saab JAS 39 Gripen.

=== Failed bids ===
==== Belgium ====
On 12 March 2014, Belgian newspaper De Morgen reported that Boeing was in talks with the Belgian Ministry of Defence about the Super Hornet as a candidate to replace Belgium's aging F-16 fleet. In April 2017, Boeing announced it would not compete in the competition, citing it "does not see an opportunity to compete on a truly level playing field". On 25 October 2018, Belgium officially selected the offer for 34 F-35As to replace its fleet of around 54 F-16s.

==== Brazil ====
Boeing proposed the Super Hornet to the Brazilian government in response to an initial requirement for 36 aircraft, with a potential total purchase of 120. In October 2008, the Super Hornet was reportedly selected as one of three finalists in Brazil's fighter competition. However, news of National Security Agency spying on Brazilian leaders caused animosity between Brazil and the US. Brazil eventually dropped the Super Hornet from its final list and selected the Saab JAS 39 Gripen in December 2013.

==== Canada ====
The Super Hornet was a contender to replace the CF-18 Hornet, a version of the F/A-18A and B models, operated by the Royal Canadian Air Force. Like the older Hornet, the Super Hornet's design is well-suited to Northern Canada's rugged forward operational airfields, while its extended range removes its predecessor's main deficiency while commonalities enable a straightforward transition. In 2010, Canada decided on sole source selection of the F-35A. Boeing claimed that Canada had ignored the Super Hornet's radar cross-section characteristics during evaluation. By April 2012, Canada was reportedly reviewing its F-35 procurement. In September 2013, Boeing provided Canada with data on its Advanced Super Hornet, suggesting that 65 aircraft would cost $1.7 billion less than an F-35 fleet. The US Navy buys Super Hornets for $52 million per aircraft, while the advanced model costs $6–$10 million more per aircraft, dependent on options selected.

The Liberal government elected in 2015 indicated that it would launch a competition to replace the CF-18 fleet. During the election, Liberal Leader Justin Trudeau stated that his government would not buy the F-35. On 22 November 2016, the government announced its intention to acquire 18 Super Hornets on an interim basis. In September 2017, the U.S. State Department granted Canada permission to buy 10 F/A-18Es and 8 F/A-18Fs (or EA-18Gs) along with supporting equipment, spares, and armaments; the agreed cost totaled CA$1.5 billion, or about CA$83.3 million per aircraft, adding the supporting equipment, training, spares, and weapons increased the acquisition cost to CA$6.3 billion. However, Canadian Prime Minister Justin Trudeau warned that the pending Super Hornet sale, along with a possible sale of another 70, was adversely affected by Boeing's actions against Bombardier Aerospace, such as a complaint to the US government over the sale of CSeries airliners to Delta Air Lines at unduly low prices; in September 2017, the U.S. Department of Commerce proposed a 219% tariff on CSeries imported into the US. In January 2018, the USITC commissioners unanimously ruled against Boeing that the U.S. industry is not threatened and no duties will be imposed.

In late 2017, the Canadian Government agreed with Australia to purchase 18 used F/A-18 Hornets as an interim measure. Boeing confirmed its bid for the Advanced Fighter Program, likely offering a mix of 88 F/A-18E/F Advanced Super Hornets (Block III) and Boeing EA-18G Growlers. On 25 November 2021, Reuters reported that Boeing is out of the competition since its fighter proposal does not meet requirements with the F-35 and Saab JAS 39 Gripen remaining in competition.

==== Denmark ====
In 2008, the Royal Danish Air Force was offered the F/A-18E/F Super Hornet as one of three fighters in a Danish competition to replace 48 F-16AM/BMs. The other contenders were the F-35A Joint Strike Fighter and the Eurofighter Typhoon. Denmark is a level-3 partner in the JSF program. The final selection was originally planned for mid-2015 where 24 to 30 fighters were expected. In April 2014, the Danish Ministry of Defence handed over a Request for Binding Information (RBI) that specifically listed the F/A-18F two-seat variant. In December 2015, the decision was postponed to 2016, with the final order's details pending negotiations. In May 2016, the Danish government recommended to parliament that 27 F-35As should be procured instead of 38 Super Hornets.

In September 2016, Boeing indicated that they would take legal action against the Danish F-35A buy, indicating that flawed data was used. In March 2018, Boeing lost the case with the court stating "The court has found that the authorities' decisions on refusal of access to the documents are legal and valid."

==== Finland ====
In June 2015, a working group set up by the Finnish MoD proposed starting the HX Fighter Program to replace the Finnish Air Force's current fleet of F/A-18C/D Hornets, which will reach the end of their service life by the end of the 2020s. The group recognised five potential types: Boeing F/A-18E/F Advanced Super Hornet, Dassault Rafale, Eurofighter Typhoon, Lockheed Martin F-35 Lightning II and Saab JAS 39 Gripen. In May 2016, the DOD announced that Boeing (with the Super Hornet) and Lockheed Martin (with the F-35) would respond to the information request. This request was sent in early 2016 with five responses received in November 2016. A call for tender will be sent in spring 2018 and the buying decision is scheduled to take place in 2021.

In February 2020, three Super Hornets (a single-seat F/A-18E, a twin-seat F/A-18F and an EA-18G) arrived at the Tampere-Pirkkala Airbase in Finland for final flight evaluations. The evaluations concluded on 28 February 2020. The Finnish newspaper Iltalehti reported that several foreign and security policy sources had confirmed the Finnish Defense Forces recommendation of the F-35, citing its capability and expected long lifespan as key reasons. Finland ordered the F-35 in February 2022.

==== Germany ====
Germany requires a replacement for its aging Panavia Tornado fleet, including both Tornado IDS (interdictor/strike) and ECR (Electronic Combat/Reconnaissance) variants. Germany considered ordering the Lockheed Martin F-35, Eurofighter Typhoon, and the Boeing F/A-18E/F Super Hornet and EA-18G Growler. In April 2020, Germany's defense secretary announced a replacement plan for a split purchase of 30 Super Hornets, 15 EA-18Gs and 55 Typhoons. However, the Defense Ministry states this is not finalized and it is being debated. As of March 2020, the Super Hornet was not certified for the B61 nuclear bombs, but Dan Gillian, Super Hornet program head, previously stated that "We certainly think that we, working with the U.S. government, can meet the German requirements..."

With increased tensions in Europe, due to the Russian invasion of Ukraine beginning 24 February 2022, Germany scrambled to accelerate defense spending priorities. Newly elected Chancellor Olaf Scholz pledged a €100 billion military upgrade, which included selecting the F-35 instead of the Super Hornet for the nuclear role and Eurofighter ECR/SEAD instead of the Growler.

==== India ====
===== Indian Air Force =====
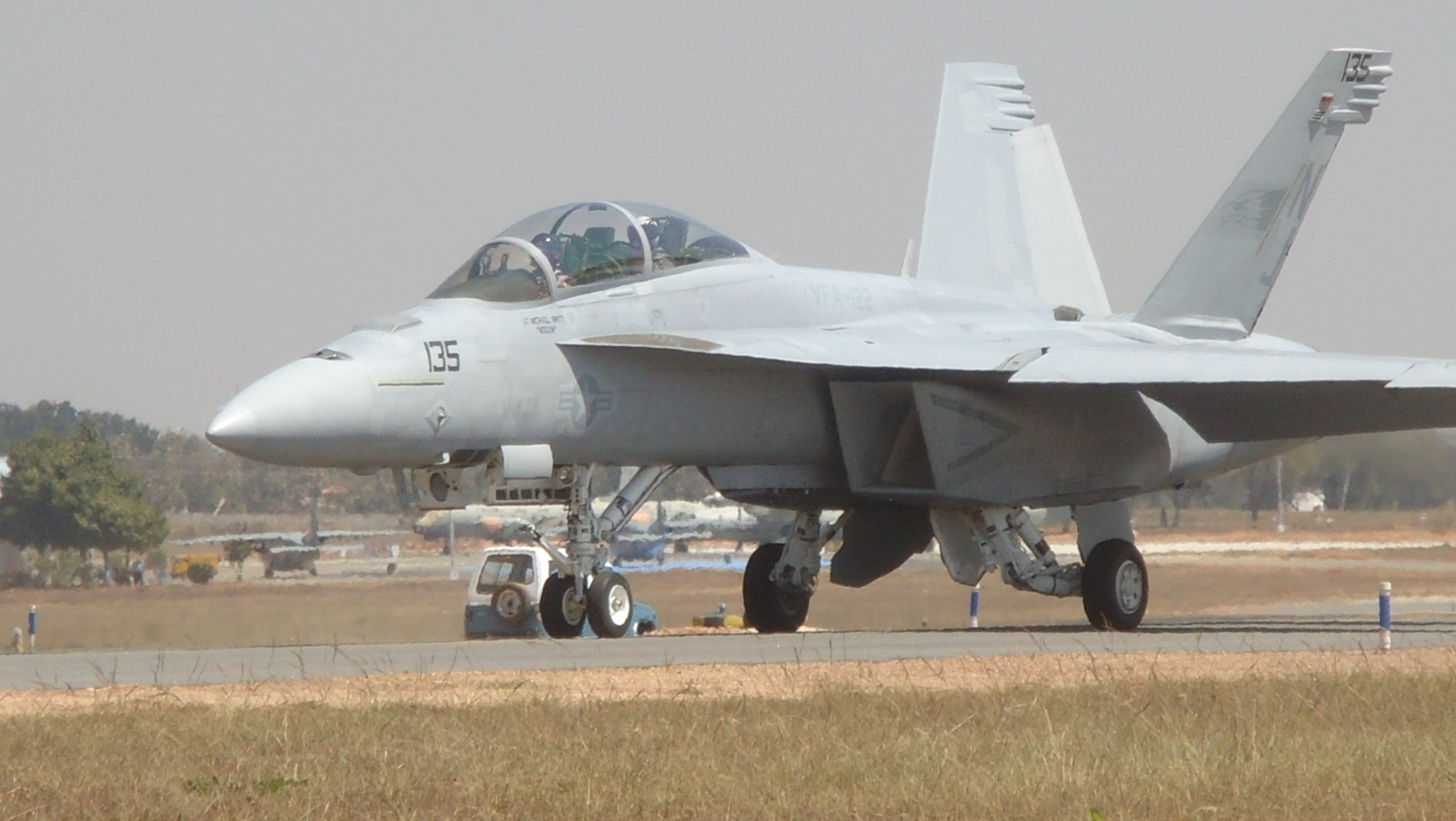
F/A-18F taxis to the runway for takeoff at Aero India 2011

For India's MMRCA competition, Boeing offered a customized variant called F/A-18IN, which included Raytheon's APG-79 AESA radar. In August 2008, Boeing submitted an industrial participation proposal detailing partnerships with companies in India. The Indian Air Force (IAF) extensively evaluated the Super Hornet, including field trials in August 2009. However, in April 2011, the IAF eliminated the F/A-18IN from the competition which was eventually won by the Dassault Rafale.

In October 2016, India reportedly received three unsolicited bids, including one from Boeing for the Super Hornet, to replace its MiG-21 and MiG-27 aircraft. The aircraft is now competing with six others in a fresh tender, referred as MMRCA 2.0, for the procurement of 114 multi-role combat aircraft for the IAF.

===== Indian Navy =====
On 17 January 2017, the Indian Navy released a Request for Information to procure 57 fighters under the Multi-Role Carrier Borne Fighter (MRCBF) programme to form the fighter wing of INS Vikrant. The requirements included day-night and all-weather operation capability, shipborne air defence, air-to-surface, buddy-buddy aerial refuelling, reconnaissance, electronic warfare among others. Deliveries would span between three and six months of the contract's signing. By June 2017, Dassault with their Rafale M, Boeing with F/A-18E/F, Saab with the Gripen Maritime and UAC with MiG-29K had formally responded to the RFI. Talks with Dassault and Boeing began by 2018 while the Request for Proposal was expected that same year under a strategic partnership (SP) model. The Navy was finalising its specific Naval Air Staff Requirements (NASR).

By December 2020, the number of fighters for the MRCBF was reduced to 36 amid a proposal by India's DRDO and ADA to develop the HAL TEDBF indigenously. There were also plans to merge the MRCBF procurement with the IAF's MRFA. That same month, Boeing Defense, Space & Security, in coordination with the United States Navy, demonstrated the F/A-18's capability to operate from a STOBAR carrier at Naval Air Station Patuxent River by conducting eight ski-jumps.

On 6 January 2022, a 12-day demonstration of the Rafale M took place at the 283 metre-long shore-based test facility (SBTF) at INS Hansa, Goa. The deal would be in the Government-to-Government (G2G) mode instead of buying directly from the manufacturers. The quantity was further reduced to 26. Between 20 May and 15 June 2022, two F/A-18E/F Block III completed "operational demonstration tests" in the same facility. Trials included multiple ski-jumps, roll-ins, fly-in-arrestments in various configurations including air-to-air, air-to-ground, and air-to-surface making the jet "compliant" with Indian Navy aircraft carriers. By 7 December 2022, the Indian Navy headquarters submitted a report to the ministry of defence in which the Rafale was allegedly the front runner after having met all criteria. The Navy HQ had performed detailed analysis of the trial report prepared by the officials who had undertaken the previous trials.

On 13 July 2023, Defence Acquisition Council (DAC) of India granted the Acceptance of Necessity (AoN) for the procurement of 26 Rafale M F4 for the Indian Navy along with three additional Kalvari-class submarines. Senior representatives from the Navy, Defense Acquisition Wing, along with Dassault and Thales, commenced negotiations on 30 May 2024. By late June 2024, the base price of Rafale was decided to be same as that of the IAF. On 3 September 2024, the Defence Acquisition Council dropped the integration of Uttam AESA radar and other indigenous weapons like Astra missiles on the Rafale M due to high costs and an estimated delay of 8 years for design changes. By 29 September 2024, Dassault submitted its final price offer for the 26 aircraft to the Navy. The squadron will be based at INS Dega, Visakhapatnam and will form the Carrier Air Group of Vikrant.

The deal, worth ₹63,887 crore (equivalent to ₹680 billion or €6.5 billion in 2026), included purchase of weapon systems like Meteor (air-to-air), Exocet (anti-ship) and SCALP (cruise missile) along with five-year performance-based logistics support and training programmes for crew training to operate and maintain the jets, associated ancillary equipment, simulator, spares and Indian Navy-specific design alterations. INS Vikrant will also be equipped for Rafale-M operations as part of the deal. Design alterations for Indian Navy jets over those of IAF include helmet mounted display, low band frequency jammers, improved radio altimeter and very high frequency range decoys as well as software changes for air to sea mode, electromagnetic interference (EMI) and electromagnetic compatibility (EMC) among others. By 3 February 2025, the price negotiations were completed.

The Cabinet Committee on Security cleared the deal on 9 April 2025. The IN-specific Rafale Ms will be showcased by Dassault within 18 months and all aircraft will be delivered within 37 to 65 months after the contract's signing. The deal was signed on 28 April 2025, and comprised 22 single-seat carrier-compatible aircraft and four twin-seat aircraft that will be solely used from land bases. The first four Rafale-Ms will be delivered by 2029. The programme was officially launched on 19 June as an Indian defence delegation, led by Joint Secretary and Acquisition Manager (Maritime Systems) Dinesh Kumar, met with French defence officials, led by Lt Gen Gael Diaz De Tuesta, Director General of Armament, during the Paris Air Show. The first Rafale Marine will be delivered in 2028. The contract also mandates technology transfer for integration of Indian weapons onboard; production of Rafale fuselage in India as well as an MRO facility for M88 engines in India.

On 15 February 2026, a La Tribune report indicated that an additional order for 31 Rafale Marines is being considered by the Indian Navy. The first aircraft delivery is expected in August–September of 2026 as of 23 March that year. French Rafales began testing at the SBTF of INS Hansa in October with focus on the modifications required for operations onboard INS Vikrant. On 29 October, following conclusion of trials, a Rafale M test aircraft conducted take-off and landing manoeuvres on Vikrant. The trials form part of the procurement contract and aims to validate the aircraft's India-specific modifications to integrate them with the aircraft carrier, especially the ones for STOBAR operations, and induct them into Indian Navy service. The Rafale belongs to the Marine Nationale fleet which operates from French aircraft carrier Charles de Gaulle. The modifications include a detachable missile rail on the wingtip of Rafale as a measure to accommodate the aircraft on the carrier and its elevators. Certain modifications are also being carried out on the elevators along with installation of specialised systems on Vikrant to integrate the aircraft. Similar changes will be necessary on INS Vikramaditya as well, where the centre lift is only 9.9 metres wide. A triangle landing aid similar to the one found on Charles de Gaulle was also seen onboard Vikrant during the landing.

The Rafale was chosen over the Super Hornet due to their commonality with the Rafale aircraft operated by the Indian Air Force, as well as availability to integrate Indian origin systems into the aircraft. The aircraft would complement the existing fleet of Navy Mikoyan MiG-29K aircraft, to be later joined by the Indian built Twin Engine Deck Based Fighter. The aircraft is to be operated on the Indian aircraft carriers INS Vikramaditya and INS Vikrant.

The order was officially signed with France on 28 April 2025.

==== Poland ====
During the 2010s, Poland sought to purchase 64 multirole combat aircraft from 2021 to replace the Polish Air Force's fleet of Sukhoi Su-22M4 ground attack aircraft and Mikoyan MiG-29 fighters. In November 2017, the Armament Inspectorate launched the acquisition process. On 22 December 2017, five entities expressed interest in participating in the market analysis phase of the procurement, referred to as "Harpia" (harpy eagle); they included Saab (Gripen NG), Lockheed Martin (F-35), Boeing (F/A-18), Leonardo (Eurofighter Typhoon) and Fights-On Logistics (second-hand F-16). On 28 May 2019, the Polish Defense Ministry formally requested to buy 32 F-35As.

==== Switzerland ====
Boeing first offered the Super Hornet to the Swiss Air Force as a replacement for Swiss F-5E Tigers before withdrawing from the competition on 30 April 2008. The Swiss Air Force was at one point intending to buy the rival Saab Gripen, but this was blocked by Swiss voters in 2014. In March 2018, Swiss officials named contenders in its Air 2030 program: The Saab Gripen, Dassault Rafale, Eurofighter Typhoon, Boeing F/A-18E/F Super Hornet and Lockheed Martin F-35. The program has a budget of US$8 billion but includes not only combat aircraft but also ground-based air defense systems. In October 2018, it was reported by Jane's that the Swiss Air Force may be limited to purchasing a single-engine fighter due to cost. The F/A-18E/F performed demonstrations for Swiss personnel at Payerne Air Base in April 2019, which was contrasted to flights performed by other bidders.

On 30 June 2021, the Swiss Federal Council proposed buying 36 F-35As to Parliament at a cost of up to 6 billion Swiss francs (US$6.5 billion), citing the aircraft's cost and combat effectiveness. The anti-military group GSoA intended to contest the purchase in another national referendum supported by the Green Party of Switzerland and the Social Democratic Party of Switzerland (which previously acted to block the Gripen). In August 2022, they registered the initiative, with 120,000 people having signed in less than a year (with 100,000 required). On 26 November 2021, it was announced that Armasuisse had agreed terms with the US government for 36 F-35As for CHF 6.035 billion. The order was then subject to parliamentary approval and the popular initiative not proceeding or failing. A parliamentary inquiry found the purchase worrisome but legal. The government did not wait for the popular initiative to proceed, which was legally permitted. On 15 September 2022, the Swiss National council gave the Federal council permission to sign the purchase deal. The deal to buy 36 F-35A was signed on 19 September 2022, with deliveries to commence in 2027 and conclude by 2030.

==== Spain ====
By 2018, Spain sought 68-72 fighters to replace its F/A-18A/B Hornets; tender participants included the Eurofighter Typhoon, Dassault Rafale, Boeing F/A-18 E/F Advanced Super Hornet, and Lockheed F-35 Lightning II. On 22 June 2022, Spain ordered 20 Tranche 4 Typhoons to replace the 20 ex-USN F/A-18s based at the Canary Islands.

==== United States Marine Corps ====
The United States Marine Corps (USMC) avoided the Super Hornet program over fears that any purchased F/A-18s would be at the cost of the F-35B STOVL fighters that they intend to operate from amphibious ships. Resistance is so high that they would rather fly former Navy F/A-18Cs. In 2011, the USMC agreed to eventually equip five Marine fighter-attack squadrons (VMFA) with the F-35C carrier variant to continue to augment Navy carrier air wings as they do with the F/A-18C.

==== Others ====
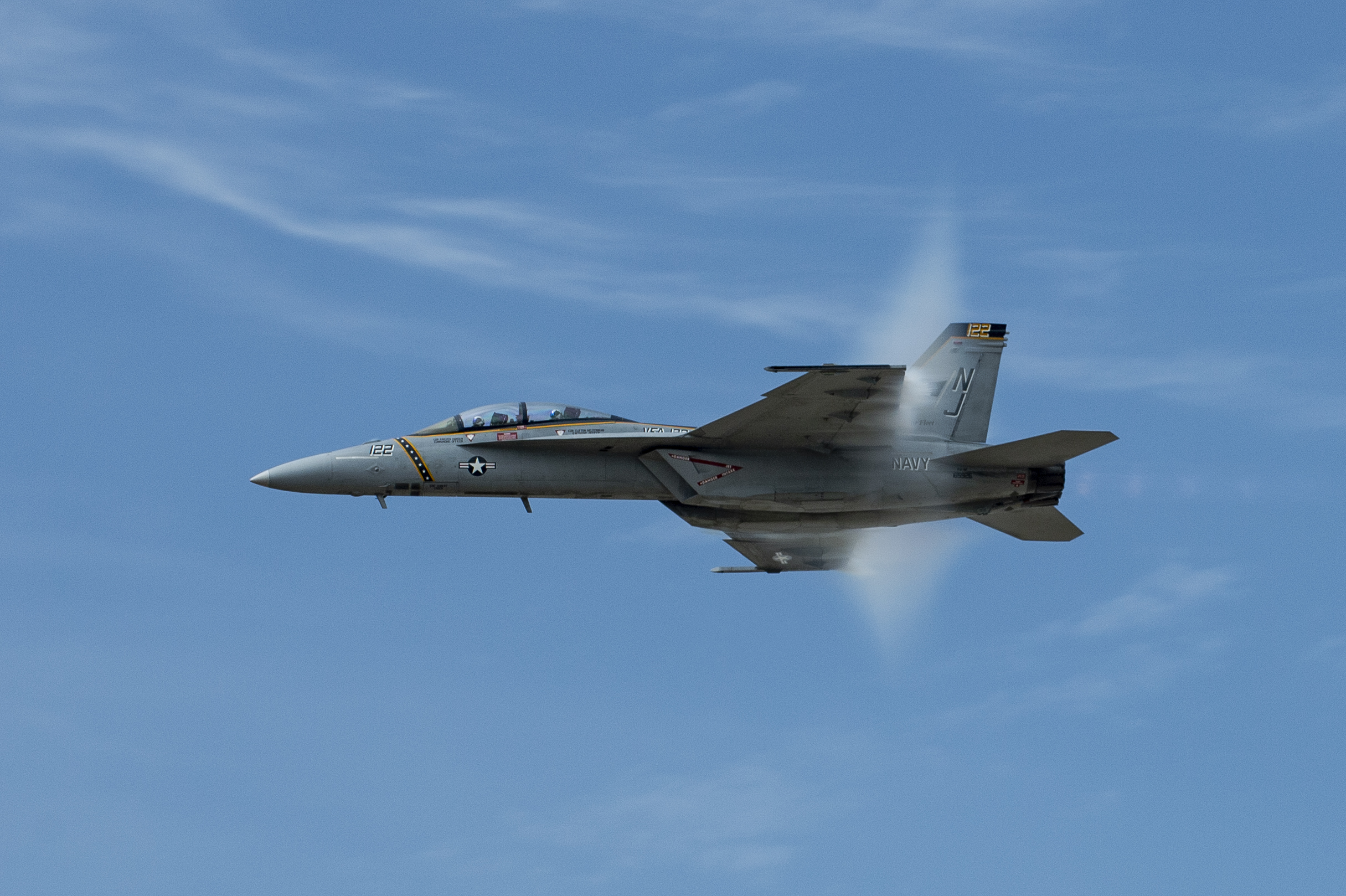
An F/A-18F during transonic flight

On 10 March 2009, Boeing offered the Super Hornet for Greece's Next-Generation Fighter Program.

On 1 August 2010, The Sunday Times reported that the British government was considering canceling orders for the F-35B and buying the Super Hornet instead for its Queen Elizabeth-class aircraft carriers, claiming a saving of around £10 billion as a result. An industry source claimed that the Super Hornet could be ski jump launched without catapults. In the end, the UK opted for a STOVL aircraft carrier equipped with F-35Bs.

The United Arab Emirates was reported to have asked for information on the Super Hornet in 2010.

In early 2011, Bulgaria was considering the F/A-18 as a replacement for its MiG-21 fleet. After initially selecting the Saab Gripen, the newly elected governing coalition restarted the program and indicated that the Super Hornet is again under consideration. The decision is expected by July 2018. In December 2018, the Bulgarian Ministry of Defence selected the offer for 8 F-16V from the United States for an estimated 1.8 billion lev ($1.05 billion) as the preferred option, and recommended the government to start talks with the US.

In 2012, Norway received an offer for at least one squadron of F/A-18s, noting its suitability to Northern Norwegian conditions.

In 2014, Boeing worked with Korean Airlines to offer the Advanced Super Hornet to the Republic of Korea Air Force as an alternative to their KF-X fighter program. Although a fighter based on the Super Hornet would save money, downgrading the program would not give South Korean industry as much knowledge as it would from developing a new fighter.

== Variants ==
F/A-18E
Single seat variant
F/A-18F
Two-seat variant
NEA-18G
Two F/A-18Fs modified as prototypes of the EA-18G Growler.
EA-18G Growler
Electronic warfare variant of the F/A-18F to replace the U.S. Navy's Grumman EA-6B Prowler.
Advanced Super Hornet
Variant of the F/A-18E/F Super Hornet with Conformal Fuel Tanks (CFT) and has a further reduced radar cross section (RCS), with the option of a stealthy enclosed weapons pod and built-in IRST21 sensor system. Not pursued by US Navy, but some elements such as the IRST sensor, although integrated into a fuel tank, became standalone upgrades while others like the enhanced cockpit were incorporated into the Block III. However, the Conformal Fuel Tanks and reduced RCS are still stated to be of interest to the RAAF.
F/A-18E/F Block II
Upgraded variant of original F/A-18E/Fs with AESA radars and better avionics

== Operators ==
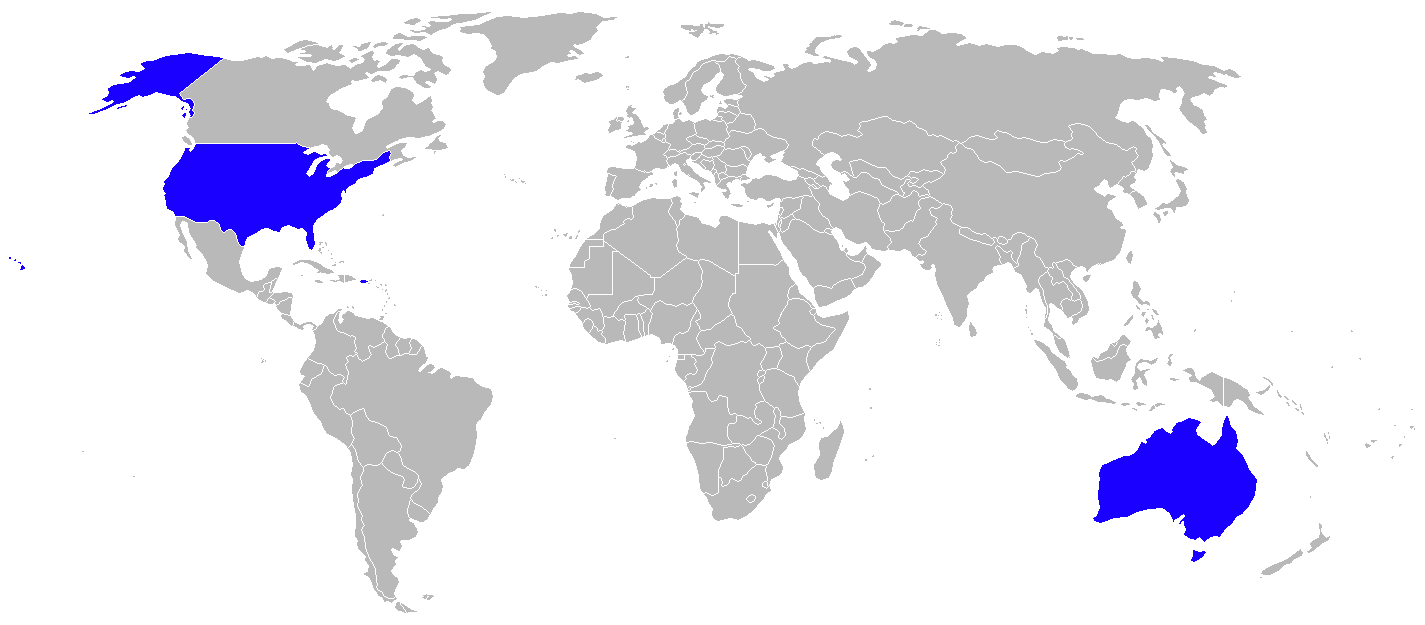
F/A-18E/F Super Hornet operators 2010

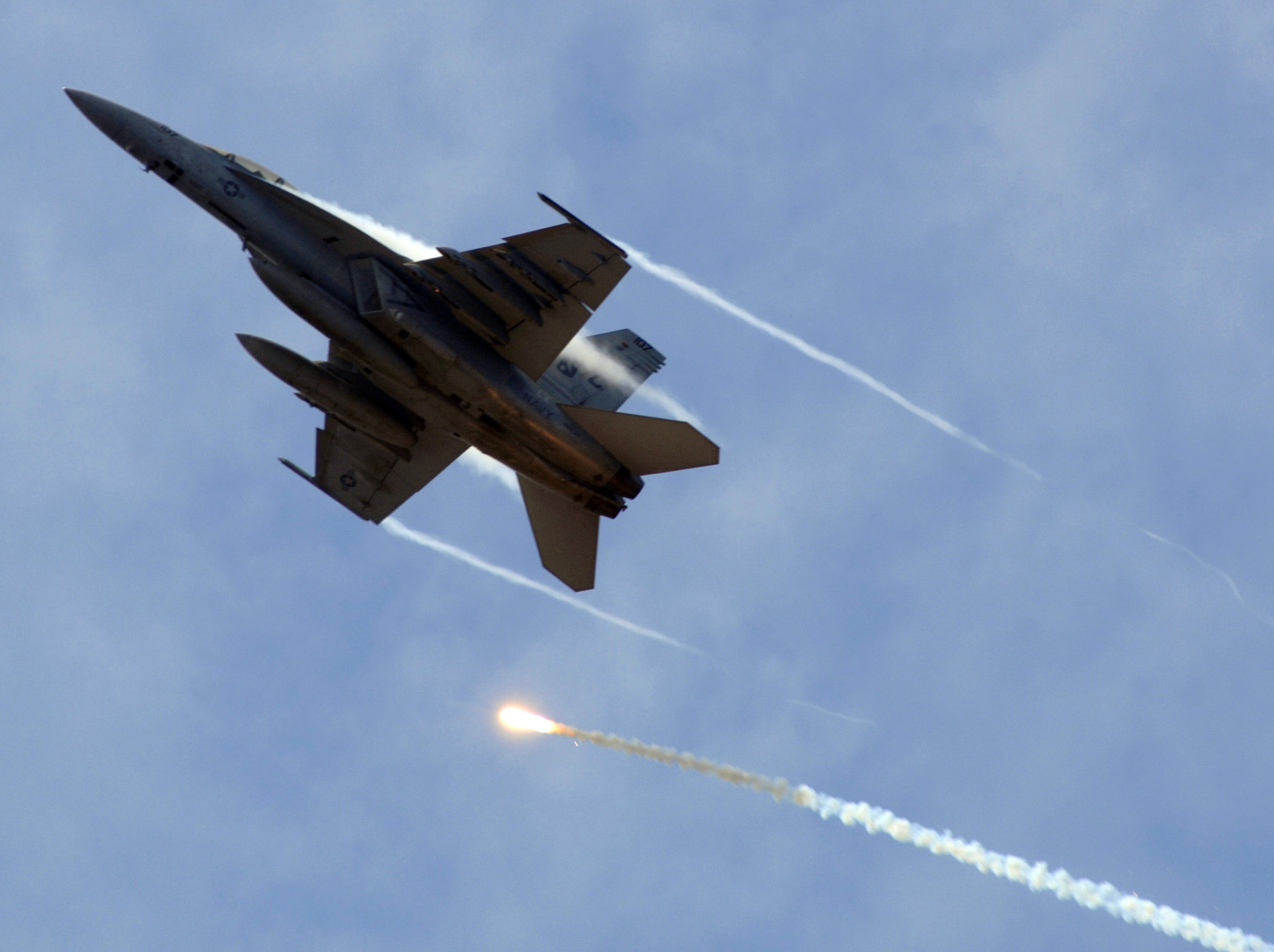
A VFA-11 F/A-18F performing evasive maneuvers during an air power demonstration

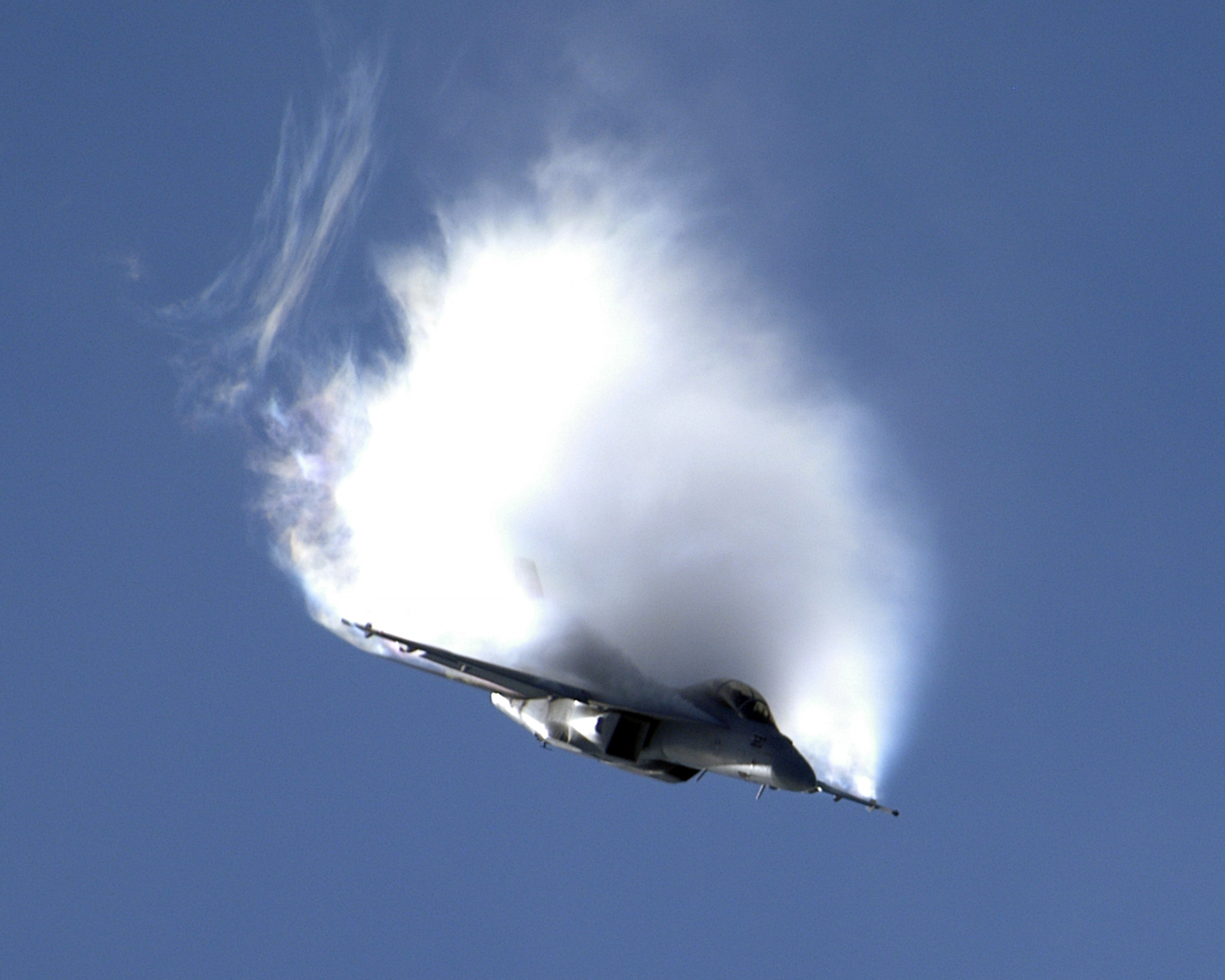
A VFA-122 F/A-18F pulling a high-g maneuver at the NAS Oceana "In Pursuit of Liberty" air show, 2004

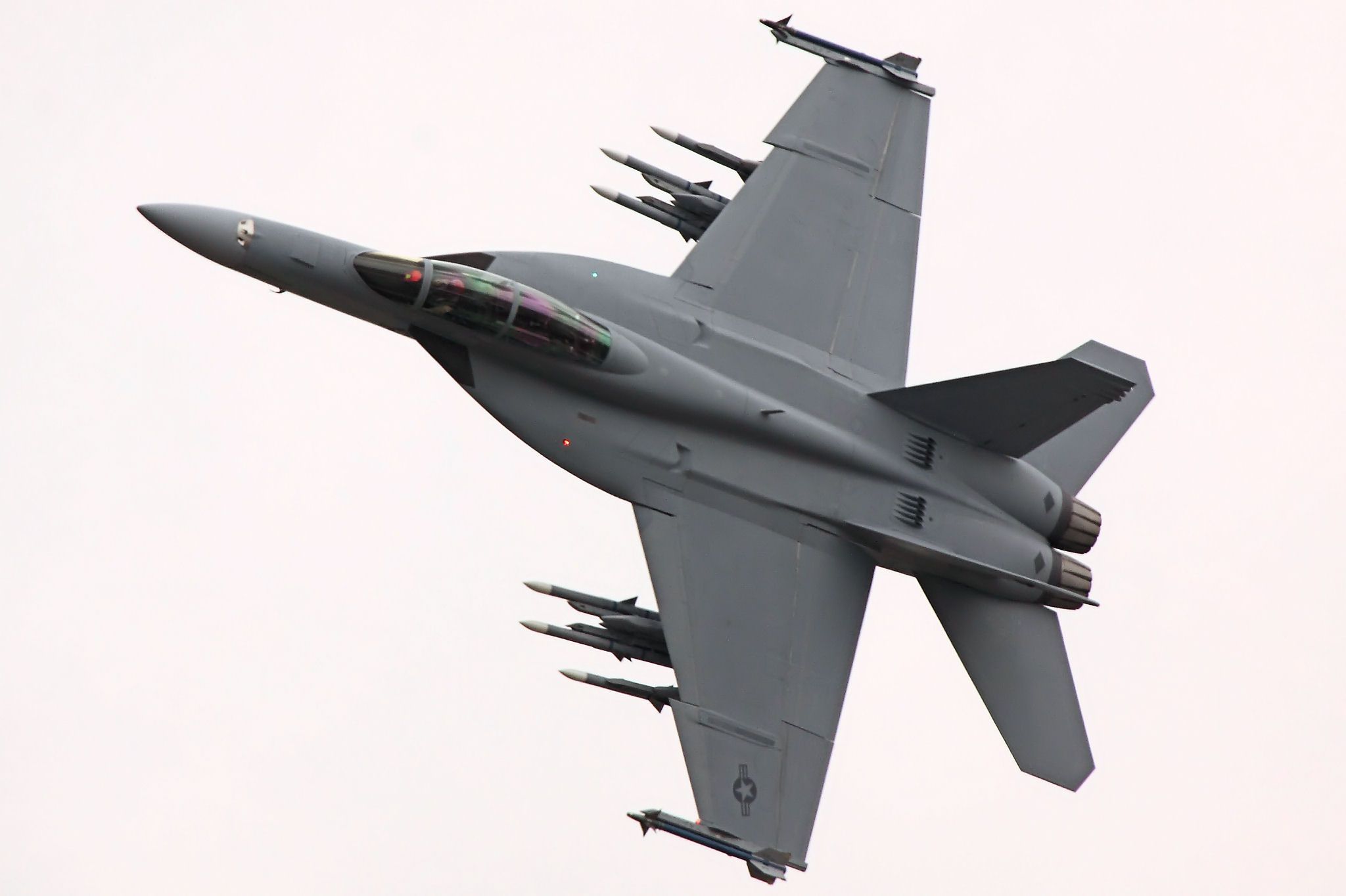
U.S. Navy F/A-18F at RIAT, 2010

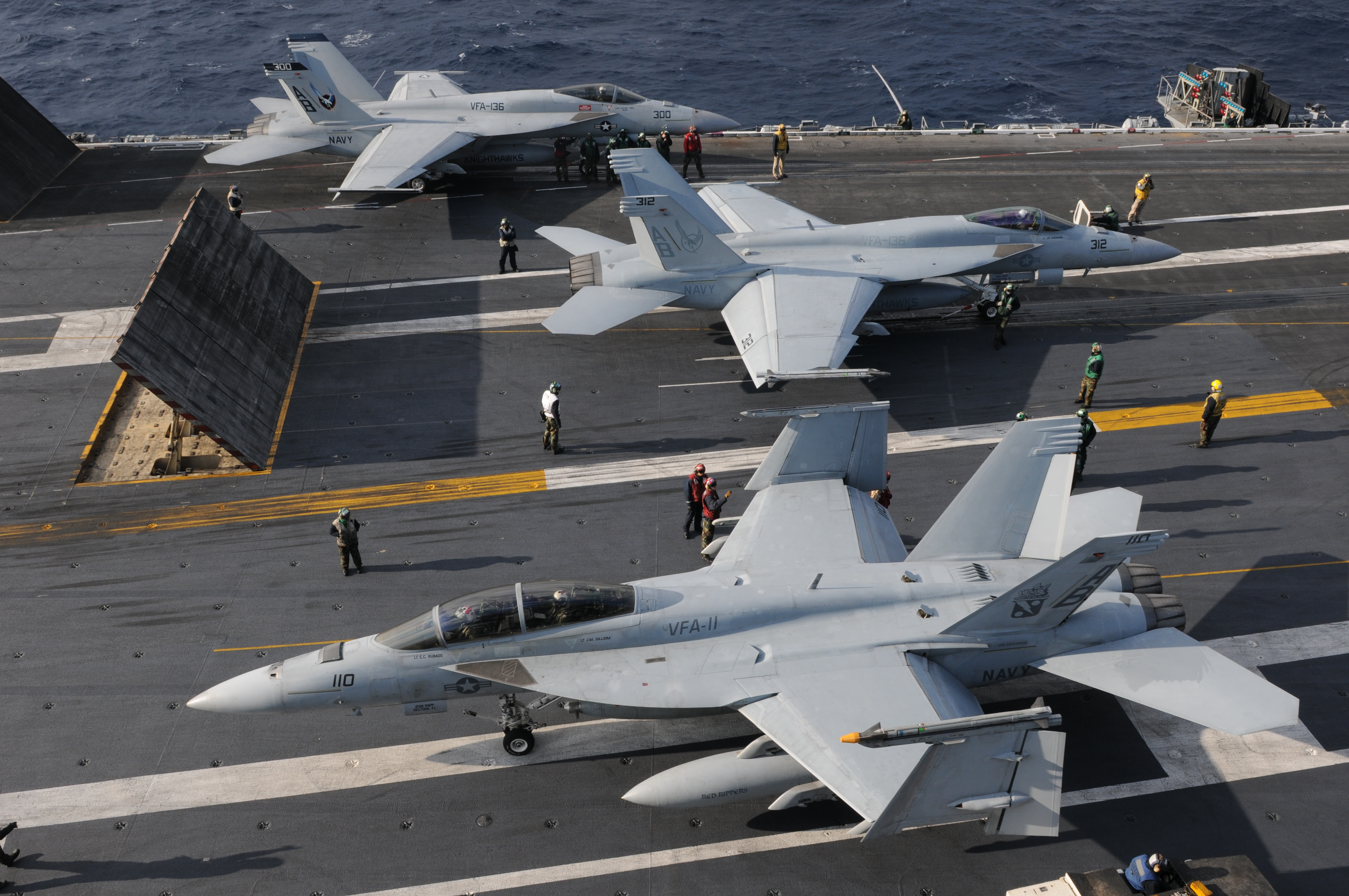
Super Hornets prepare for a catapult assisted launch on USS Enterprise.

Australia

- Royal Australian Air Force – 24 F/A-18Fs in service
  - RAAF Base Amberley, Queensland
    - No. 1 Squadron (F/A-18F)
    - No. 82 Wing Training Flight (F/A-18F)

Kuwait

- Kuwait Air Force – 22 single-seat F/A-18Es and 6 twin-seat F/A-18Fs

United States

- United States Navy – 416 F/A-18E/Fs in service plus 93 on order as of 2025
  - Pacific Fleet squadrons
    - VFA-2 "Bounty Hunters" (F/A-18F)
    - VFA-14 "Tophatters" (F/A-18E)
    - VFA-22 "Fighting Redcocks" (F/A-18F)
    - VFA-25 "Fist of the Fleet" (F/A-18E)
    - VFA-27 "Royal Maces" (F/A-18E)
    - VFA-41 "Black Aces" (F/A-18F)
    - VFA-94 "Mighty Shrikes" (F/A-18E)
    - VFA-102 "Diamondbacks" (F/A-18F)
    - VFA-113 "Stingers" (F/A-18E)
    - VFA-122 "Flying Eagles" (Fleet Replacement Squadron, operates F/A-18E/F)
    - VFA-136 "Knighthawks" (F/A-18E)
    - VFA-137 "Kestrels" (F/A-18E)
    - VFA-146 "Blue Diamonds" (F/A-18E)
    - VFA-151 "Vigilantes" (F/A-18E)
    - VFA-154 "Black Knights" (F/A-18F)
    - VFA-192 "Golden Dragons" (F/A-18E)
    - VFA-195 "Dambusters" (F/A-18E)
  - Atlantic Fleet squadrons
    - VFA-11 "Red Rippers" (F/A-18F)
    - VFA-31 "Tomcatters" (F/A-18E)
    - VFA-32 "Swordsmen" (F/A-18F)
    - VFA-34 "Blue Blasters" (F/A-18E)
    - VFA-37 "Ragin Bulls" (F/A-18E)
    - VFA-81 "Sunliners" (F/A-18E)
    - VFA-83 "Rampagers" (F/A-18E)
    - VFA-87 "Golden Warriors" (F/A-18E)
    - VFA-103 "Jolly Rogers" (Composite Squadron, operates F/A-18E/F)
    - VFA-105 "Gunslingers" (Composite Squadron, operates F/A-18E/F)
    - VFA-106 "Gladiators" (Fleet Replacement Squadron, operates F/A-18E/F)
    - VFA-131 "Wildcats" (F/A-18E)
    - VFA-143 "Pukin' Dogs" (F/A-18E)
    - VFA-211 "Fighting Checkmates" (F/A-18E)
    - VFA-213 "Black Lions" (F/A-18F)
  - Test and Evaluation squadrons
    - VX-9 "Vampires" (Air Test and Evaluation Squadron, operates F/A-18E/F and other aircraft)
    - VX-23 "Salty Dogs" (Air Test and Evaluation Squadron, operates F/A-18E/F and other aircraft)
    - VX-31 "Dust Devils" (Air Test and Evaluation Squadron, operates F/A-18E/F and other aircraft)
  - Warfighting Development Centers
    - NAWDC (Naval Aviation Warfighting Development Center, operates F/A-18E/F and other aircraft)
  - Flight Demonstration squadrons
    - U.S. Navy Flight Demonstration Squadron (Blue Angels) (F/A-18E/F)

Each U.S. Navy deployable "Fleet" VFA squadron has a standard unit establishment of 12 aircraft.

== Aircraft on display ==
F/A-18E

- 165164 – National Museum of Transportation, Kirkwood, Missouri. This is the first F/A-18E built, in 1995, and the first to be displayed.
- 165536 – Palm Springs Air Museum, Palm Springs, California. This aircraft operated as Blue Angel #5 prior to its retirement and will be displayed in the corresponding livery.

== Notable accidents ==
- On 6 April 2011, a U.S. Navy F/A-18F from VFA-122 Tactical Demonstration team crashed, killing both crew members. The crash occurred when the crew attempted to perform a loaded roll with too much speed and insufficient angle-of-attack. The loaded roll has since been removed from the Navy's F/A-18F flight demonstration routine.
- On 31 July 2019, a U.S. Navy F/A-18E from VFA-151 crashed into the side of "Star Wars Canyon" in California, killing the pilot and injuring seven French civilian sightseers at the Father Crowley Vista Point 40 feet (12 m) above the impact point. The crash was attributed to flying "too fast and too low with respect to the surrounding terrain". Military training within the canyon was suspended, with standing instructions to stay above the rim of the canyon.
- On 3 June 2022, a U.S. Navy F/A-18E from VFA-113 crashed near NAWS China Lake, killing the pilot.
- On 22 December 2024, a U.S. Navy F/A-18F took off from the aircraft carrier USS Harry S. Truman operating in the Red Sea and was hit by friendly SM-2 surface-to-air missile fired from USS Gettysburg operating in the same area. The two pilots onboard ejected with minor injuries and were rescued.
- On 28 April 2025, a F/A-18E Super Hornet fell off an elevator of the USS Harry Truman after the carrier turned sharply to evade Houthi fire. The driver of the tractor and the pilot both escaped without major injuries. The carrier was operating in the Red Sea during the incident.
- On 6 May 2025, a U.S. Navy F/A-18F fell overboard on the USS Harry Truman after a failure with the carrier's arresting gear. The pilot and weapons systems officer ejected safely and were recovered.
- On 20 August 2025, a U.S. Navy F/A-18E Super Hornet crashed into ocean waters off the coast of Virginia. The pilot of the aircraft belonging to Strike Fighter Squadron 83 ejected from the Super Hornet during a routine training flight, according to a statement from Navy spokesperson Lt. Jackie Parashar. Strike Fighter Squadron 83 is based out of Naval Air Station Oceana in Virginia Beach. As of 21 August 2025, the crashed jet was yet to be recovered from the water and the cause of the crash was under investigation.
- On 26 October 2025 an F/A-18F was lost serving in the South China Sea aboard USS Nimitz (CVN-68).

== Specifications (F/A-18E/F) ==
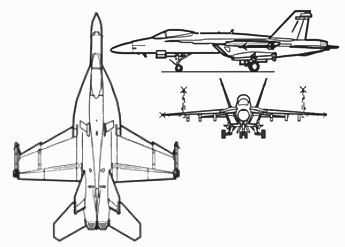
Three view projection of the Super Hornet

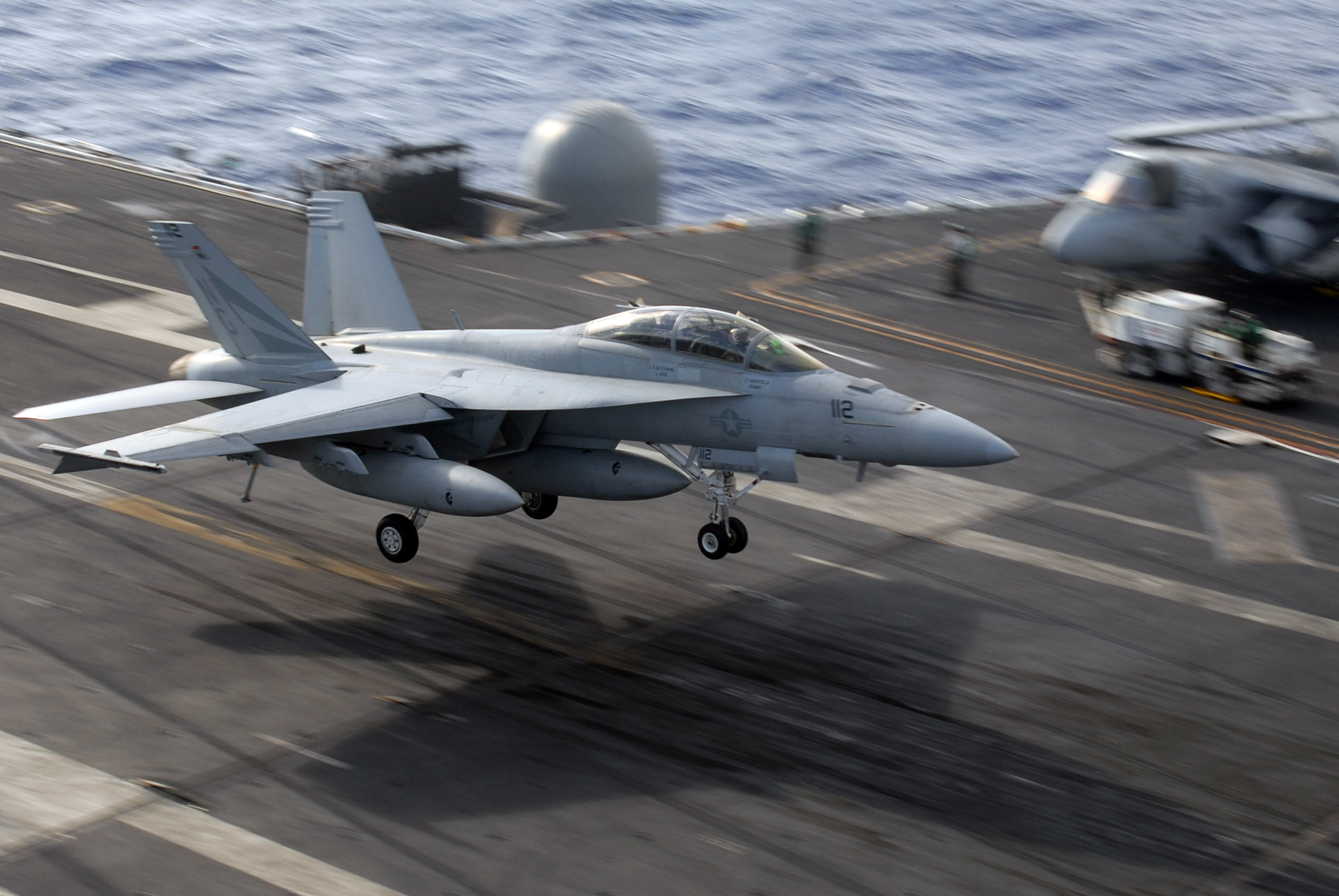
F/A-18F at landing on USS John C. Stennis

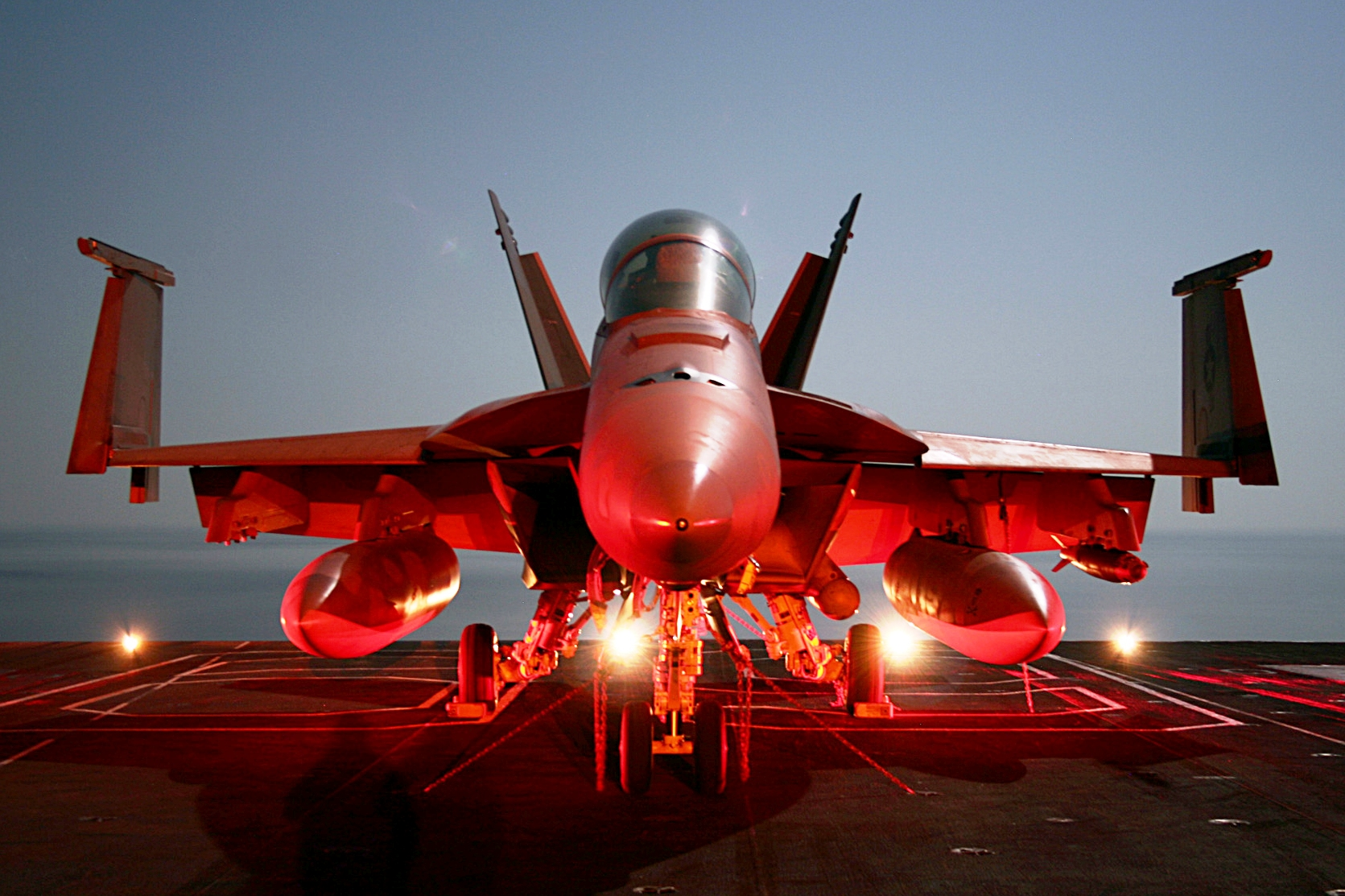
An F/A-18F parked on the flight deck of aircraft carrier Dwight D. Eisenhower, as the ship operates in the Arabian Sea, December 2006

Data from U.S. Navy fact file, F/A-18E/F NATOPS, F/A-18E Standard Aircraft Characteristics (SAC), FY 2012 Selected Acquisition Report

General characteristics

- Crew: F/A-18E: 1 (pilot), F/A-18F: 2 (pilot and weapon systems officer)
- Length: 60 ft 1.25 in (18.31 m)
- Wingspan: 44 ft 8.5 in (13.62 m)
- Height: 16 ft 0 in (4.88 m)
- Wing area: 500 sq ft (46.5 m^{2})
- Empty weight: 32,081 lb (14,552 kg)
- Gross weight: 47,000 lb (21,320 kg) (equipped for fighter escort)
- Max takeoff weight: 66,000 lb (29,937 kg)
- Internal fuel capacity: F/A-18E: 14,700 lb (6,668 kg), F/A-18F: 13,760 lb (6,241 kg)
- External fuel capacity: Up to 4 × 480 US gal (1,817 L) tanks, totaling 13,040 lb (5,915 kg), option for 2 x 515 US gal (1,949 L) conformal fuel tanks totaling an additional 7,000 lb (3,175 kg) on Block III
- Powerplant: 2 × General Electric F414-GE-400 turbofans, 13,000 lbf (58 kN) thrust each dry, 22,000 lbf (98 kN) with afterburner

Performance

- Maximum speed: Mach 1.8, 1,030 kn (1,185 mph; 1,908 km/h) clean at 40,000 ft
  - Mach 1.06, 700 kn (806 mph; 1,296 km/h) at sea level
  - Mach 1.62, 932 kn (1,073 mph; 1,726 km/h) at 36,000 ft, air-to-air loadout (2× AIM-120, 2× AIM-9, internal fuel only)
- Cruise speed: 482 kn (555 mph, 893 km/h) fighter escort
- Stall speed: 129 kn (148 mph, 239 km/h) power-off
- Range: 1,275 nmi (1,458 mi, 2,346 km) with armament of two AIM-9s
- Combat range: 558 nmi (642 mi, 1,033 km) hi-lo-hi mission with 2× GBU-10 laser guided bombs, 1× AIM-120, 2× AIM-9, 3× drop tanks
  - 404 nmi (465 mi; 748 km) fighter escort (Note: Combat fuel allowance equal to 2 minutes of maximum thrust at Mach 1, 10,000 ft. Radius decreases/increases by ~85 nmi per minute of additional/reduced combat time) with 2× AIM-120, 2× AIM-9, internal fuel only
  - 201 nmi (231 mi; 372 km) deck launched intercept (Note: Dash to target at Mach 1.4, 40,000 ft. Combat fuel allowance equal to 2 minutes of maximum thrust at same speed and altitude) with 2× AIM-120, 2× AIM-9, 1× drop tank
  - 388 nmi (447 mi; 719 km) interdiction mission (Note: 50 nmi dash in and out at Mach 0.8, sea level. Combat fuel allowance equal to 5 minutes military. thrust) with 4× Mark 83 bombs, 2× AIM-9, 2× drop tanks (Note: All figures include full cannon and fuel for 20 minute sea level loiter reserve)
- Ferry range: 1,800 nmi (2,070 mi, 3,330 km)
- Service ceiling: 52,300 ft (15,940 m)
- Rate of climb: 44,882 ft/min (228 m/s)
- Wing loading: 94.0 lb/sq ft (459 kg/m^{2}) or 127.0 lb/sq ft (620 kg/m^{2}) at max takeoff weight
- Thrust/weight: 0.93 (Note: 1.1 with loaded weight & 50% internal fuel)
- Design load factor: 7.5 g

Armament

- Guns: 1× 20 mm (0.787 in) M61A2 Vulcan, 412 rounds
- Hardpoints: 11 (2× wingtips, 6× under-wing, and 3× under-fuselage) with a capacity of Max payload: 17,750 lb (8,050 kg). Carrier bringback payload: F/A-18E: 9,900 lb (4,491 kg), F/A-18F: 9,000 lb (4,082 kg), with provisions to carry combinations of:
  - Missiles:
    - Air-to-air missiles
      - Fighter escort: 7× AIM-120 AMRAAM (Note: AMRAAM loadout can be reduced to 2 for increased range.) and 2× AIM-9 Sidewinder or
      - 5x AIM-120 and 4× AIM-9 or
      - 4× AIM-174B, (Note: 4x missiles has been tested but no evidence of this configuration being operational yet.) 3× AIM-120, and 2× AIM-9 or
      - 4× AIM-7 Sparrow and 2× AIM-9
      - maximum of 2× AIM-9 and:
        - 12× AIM-120 AMRAAM or 8× AIM-7 Sparrow
    - Air-to-surface missiles
      - AGM-65E/F Maverick
      - AGM-84H/K SLAM-ER
      - AGM-88 HARM
      - AGM-88G AARGM-ER [being integrated]
      - AGM-158 JASSM
      - AGM-154 Joint Standoff Weapon (JSOW) - glide bomb
      - AGM-84 Harpoon
      - AGM-158C LRASM
      - Joint Strike Missile (JSM) (to be integrated)
  - Bombs:
    - JDAM bombs (up to 10× GBU-32/35/38/54 or 4× GBU-31)
    - Paveway series of laser-guided bombs
    - Mk 80 series unguided bombs
    - Mk-62/63/65 Quick Strike Naval mine
  - Other:
    - SUU-42A/A Flares/infrared decoy dispenser pod and chaff pod
    - AN/ALE-50 towed decoy system pod
    - up to 4× 480 US gal (1,800 L; 400 imp gal) drop tanks and 1× A/A42R-1 Aerial Refueling Store pod for aerial refueling.
    - 12× ADM-141C TALD decoys
    - AWW-13 Advanced data link pod

Avionics

- Hughes AN/APG-73 or Raytheon AN/APG-79 AESA radar
- Northrop Grumman/ITT ALQ-165 self-protection jammer system or L3Harris AN/ALQ-214 integrated defensive electronic countermeasures system
- Raytheon AN/ALE-50 or BAE Systems AN/ALE-55 towed decoy
- Raytheon AN/ALR-67(V)3 radar warning receiver
- Lockheed Martin AN/ASG-34(V)1 IRST21 infrared search and track (mounted on centerline external tank)
- Raytheon AN/ASQ-228 ATFLIR or Northrop Grumman AN/AAQ-28(V) Litening targeting pod
- MIDS LVT or MIDS JTRS datalink transceiver

== See also ==
- Aircraft in fiction#F/A-18E/F Super Hornet

Related development

- McDonnell Douglas F/A-18 Hornet
- Boeing EA-18G Growler

Aircraft of comparable role, configuration, and era

- Dassault Rafale
- Eurofighter Typhoon
- J-15 / J-11BH/SH / Sukhoi Su-33
- Mikoyan MiG-29K / Mikoyan MiG-35

Related lists

- List of fighter aircraft
- List of active United States military aircraft
- List of United States military aerial refueling aircraft
