= VFA-151 =

Strike Fighter Squadron 151
- Active: 6 August 1948 – present
- Country: United States
- Branch: United States Navy
- Type: Fighter/Attack
- Role: Close air support Air interdiction Aerial reconnaissance
- Part of: Carrier Air Wing Nine
- Garrison/HQ: NAS Lemoore
- Nickname: "Vigilantes"
- Motto: "FIGHT UGLY!"
- Colors: Black and Yellow
- Mascot: "Old Ugly"
- Engagements: Korean War; Vietnam War; Gulf War; Operation Southern Watch; Iraq War; Operation Enduring Freedom; Operation Prosperity Guardian; Operation Poseidon Archer; Operation Epic Fury

Commanders
- Commanding Officer: CMD. Preston J. Ochoa
- Executive Officer: CMD. Brian M. Hansen.
- Command Master Chief: CMDCM Branden J. Wilkins

Aircraft flown
- Fighter: F6F Hellcat; F4U Corsair; F9F Panther; F2H Banshee; F4D Skyray; F3H Demon; F-4 Phantom II; F/A-18A/C Hornet; F/A-18E Super Hornet

Strike Fighter Squadron One Five One (VFA-151) nicknamed the Vigilantes are a United States Navy F/A-18E Super Hornet fighter squadron stationed at Naval Air Station Lemoore, California. The squadron is a part of Carrier Air Wing 9 (CVW-9). As part of CVW-9, the squadron's tail code is NG and its radio callsign is "Ugly".

The unit's patch appears worn by Glen Powell in Top Gun: Maverick.

== Squadron insignia and nickname ==
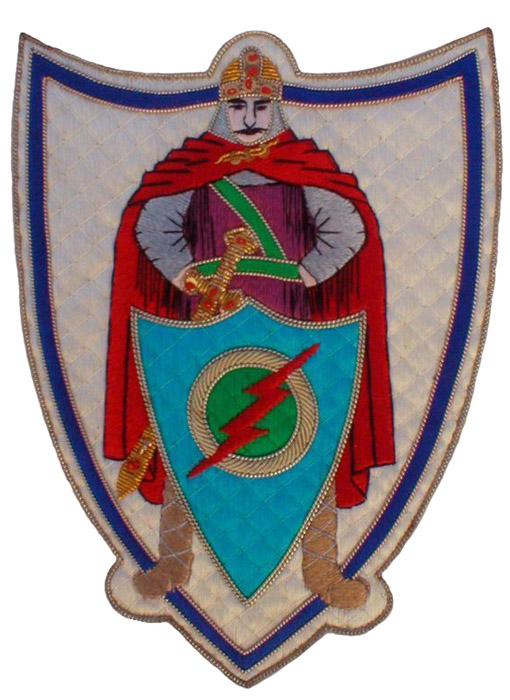
The squadron's first insignia

The squadron's first insignia was approved by CNO on 9 August 1949, and consisted of a blue helmeted knight and a white shield. The squadron also adopted the nickname "Flashers" in 1949. The current insignia was approved on 26 May 1955. The squadron changed its nickname to "Vigilantes" in 1959, symbolizing the unit's "around-the-clock" vigil of readiness.

== History ==
Four distinct U.S. Navy squadrons have been designated VF-151. The first VF-151 was established, and then disestablished, in 1945. The second was established at VF-153 in 1945 and eventually became VFA-192. The third squadron was originally established as VF-65 in 1951 and was eventually disestablished as VA-23 in 1970. The fourth squadron to be designated VF-151 was established as VF-23 in 1948, eventually became VFA-151, and is the main subject of this article.

=== 1940s ===
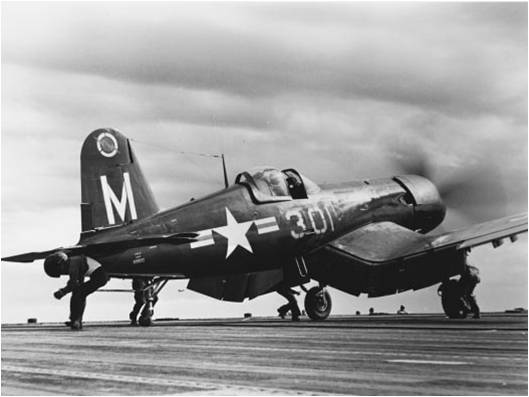
VF-23 F4U-5 Corsair on the deck of USS Wright

Strike Fighter Squadron 151 (VFA-151) was originally established as Fighter Squadron 23 (VF-23) at Naval Air Station Oceana, Virginia on 6 August 1948. The squadron was attached to Air Group Two aboard USS Midway and flew the F4U-5 Corsair and F6F-5P Hellcat. By April 1949, the squadron flew the F4U-4 Corsair exclusively, embarking with that aircraft for a Mediterranean Sea deployment from May–December 1949.

=== 1950s ===
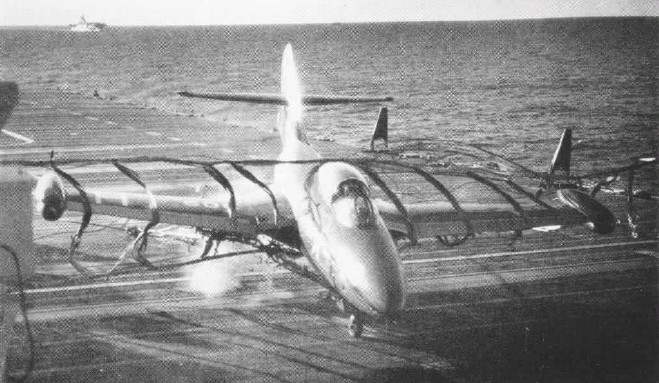
VF-23 F9F-2 hits the barrier aboard USS Boxer

In August 1950, the squadron moved to NAS Alameda, California, and then deployed for the first of three cruises in support of the Korean War. On 15 September 1950, the squadron flew combat missions from USS Boxer in support of the amphibious landings at Inchon, Korea. Upon their return to the US, the squadron relocated to NAS Moffett Field in November 1950. The squadron transitioned to the jet age in Jan 1951, flying the straight-wing F9F-2 Panther on their second Korea deployment from USS Princeton. During their third Korean War deployment, while flying from USS Essex in August 1952, squadron aircraft participated in joint operations with the U.S. Air Force, striking targets in Pyongyang and the surrounding area.

The squadron transitioned to the F2H-3 Banshee in March 1953 and adopted a new role as an all-weather fighter squadron. In March 1954, the squadron was deployed to the western Pacific aboard USSEssex when the carrier was ordered to operate off the coast of Vietnam during the Battle of Dien Bien Phu.

In December 1956, VF-23 transitioned to the F4D-1 Skyray, and in August and September 1958, the squadron flew sorties from USS Hancock in the Taiwan Straits after the Chinese Communists bombarded Quemoy Island.

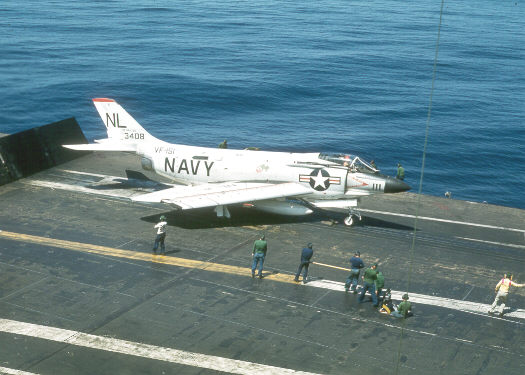
VF-151 F3H-2 on USS Coral Sea

Second insignia, as used in 1959

VF-23 deployed to the WestPac aboard USS Hancock in 1958 and again 1959. The squadron, now known as the Vigilantes, transitioned to the F3H-2 Demon in January 1959. A month later, the squadron was redesignated Fighter Squadron One Fifty One (VF-151) on 23 February 1959 and assigned to Carrier Air Group 15.

=== 1960s ===
In July 1961, the squadron moved homeport to NAS Miramar and made the first of three WestPac deployments aboard USS Coral Sea. In January 1964, the squadron transitioned to the F-4B Phantom and deployed for its first Vietnam War cruise on 7 December 1964. During the eleven month combat deployment, the squadron flew nearly 1500 combat sorties, including support of the 1965 Operation Rolling Thunder bombing campaign against military targets in North Vietnam. The squadron returned to Southeast Asia on their second Vietnam deployment in May 1966 aboard USS Constellation.

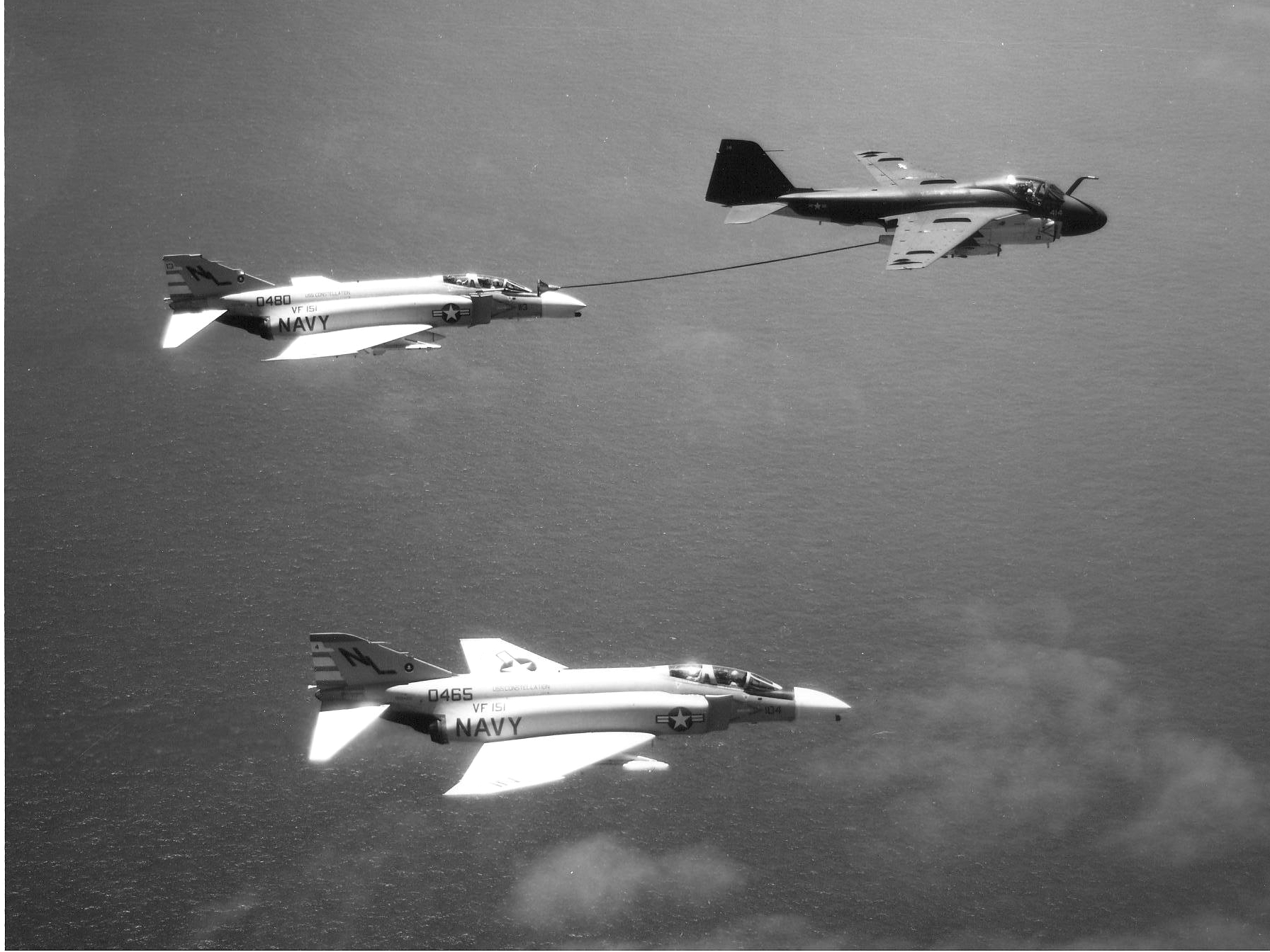
Two VF-151 F-4Bs refueling over the Gulf of Tonkin, in 1966.

The squadron made its third deployment of the war aboard USS Coral Sea from July 1967 to April 1968. On 24 October 1967 the squadron's commanding officer, CDR C.R. Gillespie, and his Radar Intercept Officer, LTJG R.C. Clark, were shot down by a surface-to-air missile over North Vietnam. CDR Gillespie became a prisoner of war and was not released until May 1973, while LTJG Clark died in captivity.

In March 1968, USS Coral Sea, with VF-151 embarked, operated on station off the coast of Korea following the capture of USS Pueblo by North Korea. The squadron deployed again in September 1968 with Carrier Air Wing 15 (CVW-15) aboard USS Coral Sea again following a short turn-around period. The squadron made its fifth combat deployment of the war in September 1969 aboard USS Coral Sea and flew more than 2100 combat sorties, more than any other Navy squadron in FY1970.

=== 1970s ===
The squadron deployed on its sixth combat cruise of the war in April 1971 with Carrier Air Wing 5 (CVW-5) aboard USS Midway, flying 1012 combat sorties. In April 1972, the squadron deployed on its seventh and final deployment of the Vietnam War. During this deployment, the squadron spent 205 continuous days in combat flight operations, including support of Operation Linebacker, the bombing campaign designed to disrupt supplies to the North Vietnamese. The squadron's 205 days of continuous combat flight operations was the longest period of combat flight operations in the history of the Vietnam War. From 1965 to 1973, the squadron participated in every major operation of the Vietnam War, made more combat deployments (7) and spent more time on the line (927 days) than any other carrier based unit – including the longest deployment of the Vietnam War (331 days on USS Coral Sea) and the longest line period of the Vietnam War (208 days on USS Midway).

The squadron returned to San Francisco, California from Vietnam in March 1973 and transitioned to the F-4N. On 11 September 1973, USS Midway with VF-151 aboard, departed the US for the last time for many years to come. The ship arrived at its new port of United States Fleet Activities Yokosuka, Japan and the squadron at its new home of NAF Atsugi, Japan on 5 October. The ship was met by a group of Japanese demonstrators, railing against the home porting of a US "Man-of-War" in Japanese waters.

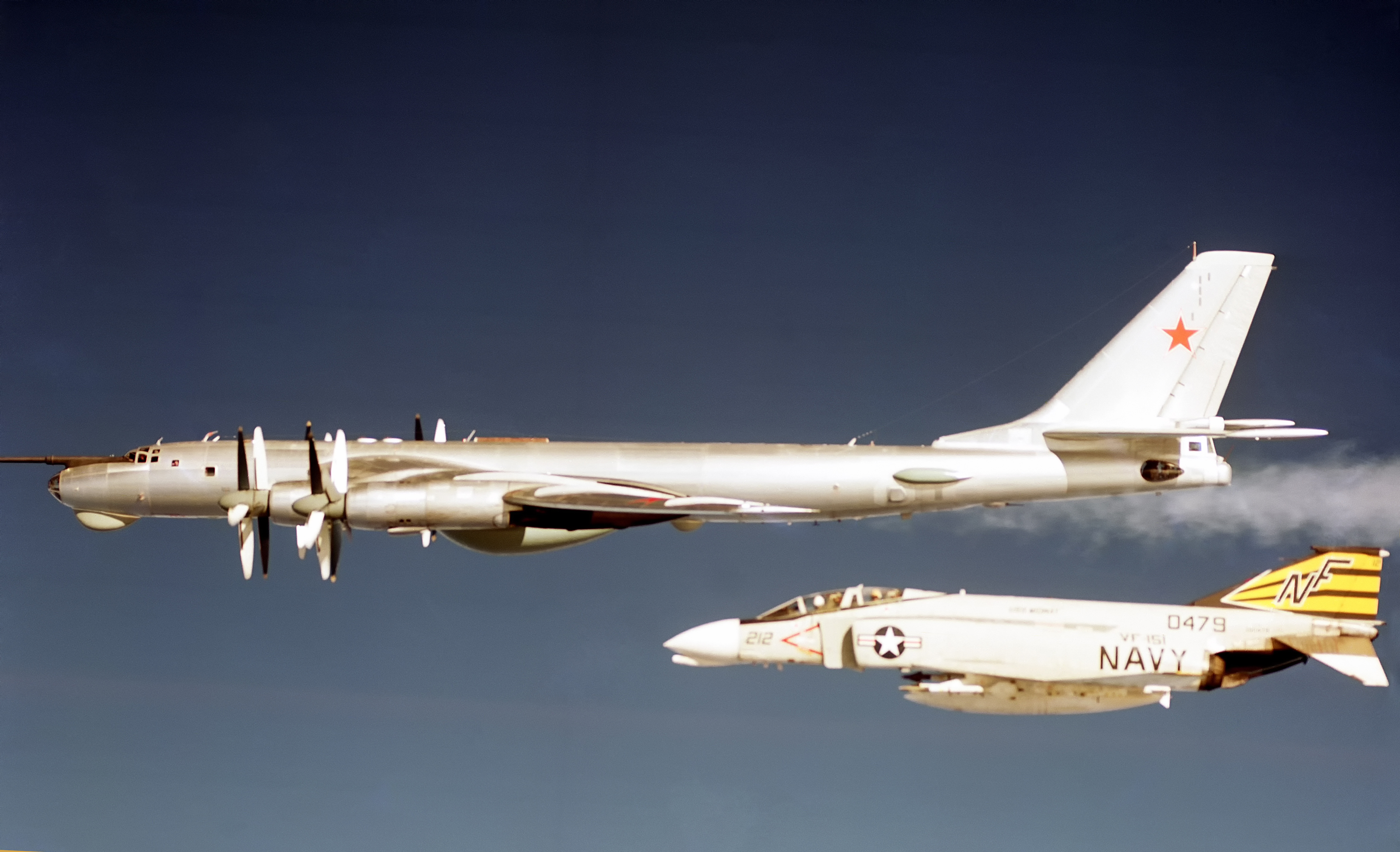
VF-151 F-4B intercepts a Soviet Tu-95

On 1 April 1975, the squadron departed NAF Atsugi and headed for the South China Sea for what would ultimately be called Operation Frequent Wind, the evacuation of US personnel from Saigon as the country fell to the North Vietnamese. The ship took aboard Marine helicopters as it passed Okinawa and offloaded them when in the vicinity of Naval Air Station Cubi Point in the Philippines. The ship then headed for the coast of Vietnam and the squadrons flew Combat Air Patrols as the North Vietnamese moved quickly through South Vietnam.

From August to September 1976, the squadron conducted flight operations near the Korean Peninsula following the Axe-murder Incident.

In August 1977, the squadron transitioned to the F-4J. In 1978 the squadron was named the top TACAIR squadron in CVW-5 and received the Chief of Naval Operations Safety "S" award. The squadron made three Indian Ocean deployments between 1979 and 1980. During 1979 USS Midway, with VF-151 embarked, deployed to the Gulf of Aden following the outbreak of fighting between North and South Yemen and the Iranian Revolution. During the 1980 deployment following the Iranian seizure of the American Embassy in Teheran, USS Midway, with VF- 151 embarked, proceeded to the Gulf of Oman and remained on station until relieved in early February 1980.

=== 1980s ===
In December 1980, the squadron transitioned to the F-4S.

On 24 March 1986, the squadron flew off USS Midway for the last time as VF-151. This event also marked the end of an era, as it was the last flight of the F-4 Phantom II from the deck of an aircraft carrier. The squadron reported to NAS Lemoore, California for transition to the new F/A-18A Hornet. VF-151 was one of only two F-4 fighter squadrons to transition to the F/A-18A and be redesignated a strike fighter squadron. The squadron was re-designated Strike Fighter Squadron 151 (VFA-151) on 1 June 1986. In November of that year, the squadron returned to USS Midway and NAF Atsugi.

In September 1988 during the 1988 Summer Olympics in Seoul, South Korea, the squadron was embarked on USS Midway and operating in the Sea of Japan to demonstrate U.S. support for a peaceful Olympics.

In December 1989, USS Midway, with VFA-151 embarked, maintained station off the coast of the Philippines during an attempted coup in that country.

=== 1990s ===
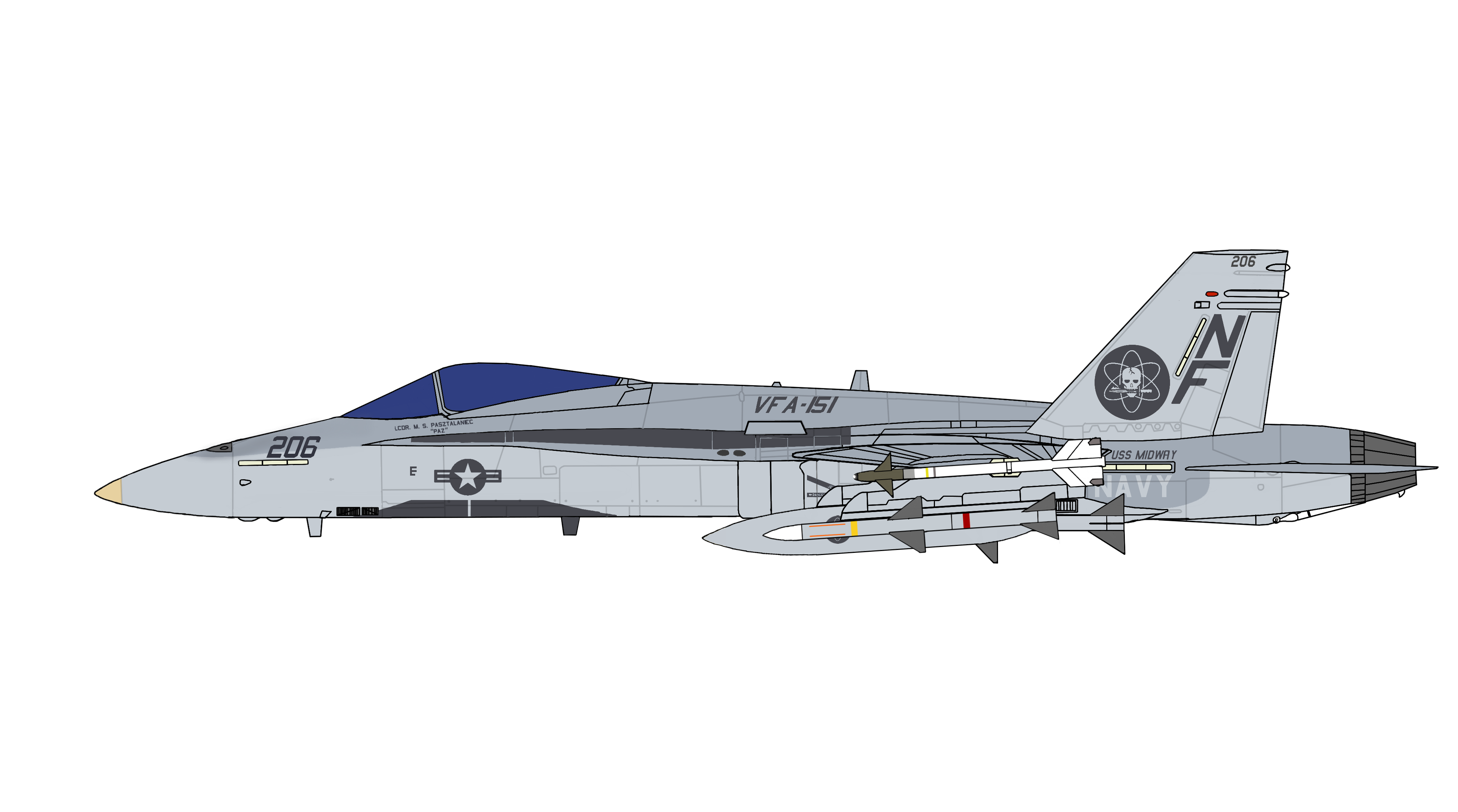
F/A-18A Hornet BuNo 162900 as NF-206 assigned to VFA-151 during the Gulf War aboard the USS Midway CV-41.

VFA-151 deployed aboard USS Midway in October 1990 in support of Operation Desert Shield. Hostilities escalated in Iraq, and on 17 January 1991 the squadron participated in the initial air strikes of Operation Desert Storm. During the campaign, the squadron dropped more than 817,000 pounds of ordnance on key targets in Iraq, Kuwait, and the Northern Persian Gulf.

In August 1991, the squadron left Japan aboard USS Midway bound for NS Pearl Harbor, Hawaii on the USS Midway's last underway period. VFA-151 then transferred to CVW-2, and moved to NAS Lemoore, California. In February 1993, the squadron transitioned their aircraft to upgraded Lot 15 F/A-18C Hornets. In May 1993, the squadron embarked on USS Constellation and travelled from the East Coast around Cape Horn South America to her new homeport in San Diego, California.

The squadron contributed to the enforcement of "no-fly" zones over southern Iraq during combat-zone WestPac deployments in support of Operation Southern Watch in 1994–1995. Additional WESTPAC deployments in support of Operation Southern Watch continued on-board USS Constellation in 1997 and 1999.

=== 2000s ===
The squadron was the recipient of Strike Fighter Wing Pacific's Battle "E" award for CY2000 and deployed on USS Constellation again in 2001.

The squadron deployed for its final deployment aboard USS Constellation in November 2002. Following a successful combat deployment, USS Constellation was decommissioned in San Diego, California 7 August 2003. VFA-151, along with CVW-2, moved to USS Abraham Lincoln. In October 2004, the squadron deployed on its first WESTPAC/Surge in support of the US Navy's new Fleet Response Plan. While deployed, the squadron participated in Operation Unified Assistance, the humanitarian relief effort to assist survivors of the tsunami that struck Southeast Asia on 26 December 2004.

Between 24–31 March 2006, during Foal Eagle 2006 exercises, squadrons VFA-2, VFA-34, VFA-137, and VFA-151 from CVW-2 teamed with U.S. Air Force aircraft from the 18th Wing based at Kadena Air Base to provide combat air patrols and coordinated bombing runs via the exercise's Combined Air Operations Center.

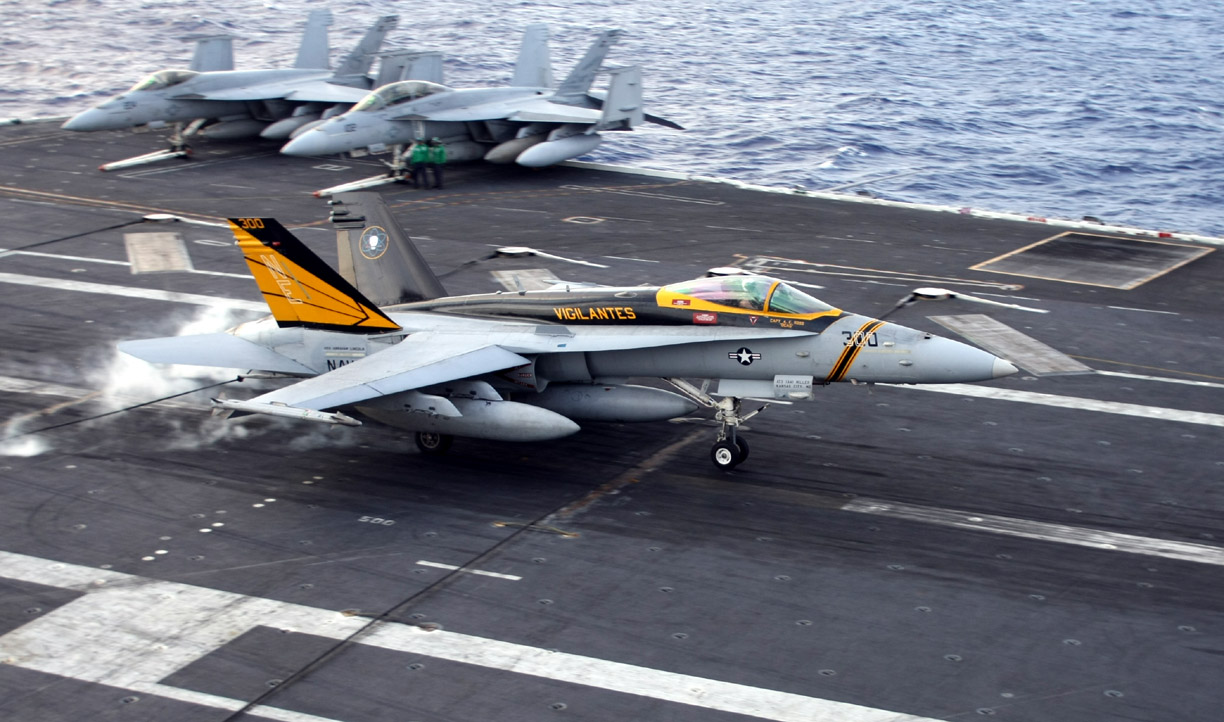
VFA-151 F/A-18C lands aboard USS Abraham Lincoln in 2008

In 2008 VFA-151 deployed again on board the USS Abraham Lincoln in the Fifth Fleet Area of Responsibility (AOR) which upon returning they again received the Battle "E" for the year of 2008.

=== 2010s ===
The squadron deployed again aboard USS Abraham Lincoln in support of Operation New Dawn and Operation Enduring Freedom in the Fifth Fleet AOR from October 2010 to March 2011. The squadron was awarded the Battle "E" for the year of 2010 as well as the Michael J. Estocin award.

In December 2011 the squadron was deployed again in support of Operation Enduring Freedom in the Fifth Fleet AOR for a five-month "surge" deployment. After extending twice, the squadron returned home in August 2012. After five months flying the F/A-18C post-deployment, VFA-151 began transitioning to Lot 35/36 F/A-18E Super Hornets in February 2013. With the transition, the squadron left CVW-2 and moved to CVW-9 attached to USS John C. Stennis on 1 June 2013. August 2019 the Squadron lost an F/A-18E Super Hornet flown out of NAS Lemoore, it crashed into the wall of what is known as "Star Wars Canyon", near Naval Air Weapons Station at China Lake. The aviator did not survive.

=== 2020s ===
In late Feb 2026, as part of CVW-9, VFA-151 and their F/A-18Es operating off the USS Abraham Lincoln, undertook combat sorties within Operation Epic Fury against Iran.

== Awards ==
The squadron has been awarded the Humanitarian Service Medal, Presidential Unit Citation, eight Armed Forces Expeditionary Medals, four Battle "E" awards, six Safety S's, six Navy Unit Commendations, the Michael J. Estocin award and seven Republic of Vietnam Meritorious Unit Citations.

== See also ==
- List of inactive United States Navy aircraft squadrons
- List of United States Navy aircraft squadrons
- Modern United States Navy carrier air operations
- Naval aviation
