= VFA-97 =

US Navy unit

Strike Fighter Squadron 97
- Active: 1 June 1967–present
- Country: United States
- Branch: United States Navy
- Type: Fighter/Attack
- Role: Close air support Air interdiction Aerial reconnaissance
- Part of: Carrier Air Wing Two
- Garrison/HQ: NAS Lemoore
- Nickname: "Warhawks"
- Colors: Blue and yellow
- Engagements: Vietnam War; Operation Eagle Claw; Operation Earnest Will; Operation Southern Watch; Operation Restore Hope; 1994 North Korean nuclear crisis Operation Desert Fox; Operation Enduring Freedom; Iraq War; Operation Freedom's Sentinel/Resolute Support; Operation Inherent Resolve/Deliberate Resolve; Operation Prosperity Guardian; Operation Poseidon Archer

Commanders
- Commanding Officer: CDR. Michael T. Jennings
- Executive Officer: CDR. Erik S. Dill
- Command Master Chief: CMC Pierre Peacock
- MINI Command Master Chief: AMC Quentin Hayes

Aircraft flown
- Attack: A-7 Corsair II
- Fighter: F/A-18A/C Hornet; F/A-18E Super Hornet; F-35C Lightning II

Strike Fighter Squadron 97 (VFA-97) is a naval aviation squadron of the United States Navy. It is equipped with the F-35C Lightning II and is stationed at Naval Air Station Lemoore. The squadron was originally established as Attack Squadron 97 (VA-97) on 1 June 1967 and redesignated VFA-97 on 24 January 1991. The squadron is nicknamed "Warhawks" and it is currently assigned to Carrier Air Wing Two. Their radio callsign is Hawk and their tail code is NE.

== Squadron insignia and nickname ==
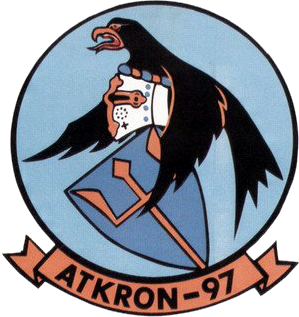
1968 VA-97 insignia

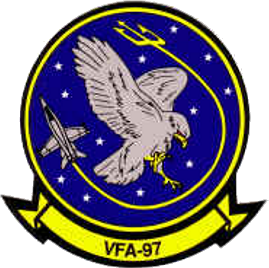
1998 VFA-97 insignia

The original VA-97 squadron insignia was approved by the Chief of Naval Operations on 6 March 1968 and they have been called the Warhawks since establishment. According to the US Navy History and Heritage Command, "The squadron continued to use its old insignia approved for VA-97. The squadron did not request a designation change to its banner following its redesignation to VFA-97." However, newer VFA-97 insignia appears to be in use.

== History ==
=== 1960s ===
VA-97 was established on 1 June 1967 and assigned to Carrier Air Wing 14 (CVW 14). On 28 May 1968, they departed San Diego embarked on USS Constellation for the squadron's first WESTPAC deployment. On 28 June 1968, the squadron conducted its first combat missions, flying the A-7A Corsair II, against targets in Vietnam.

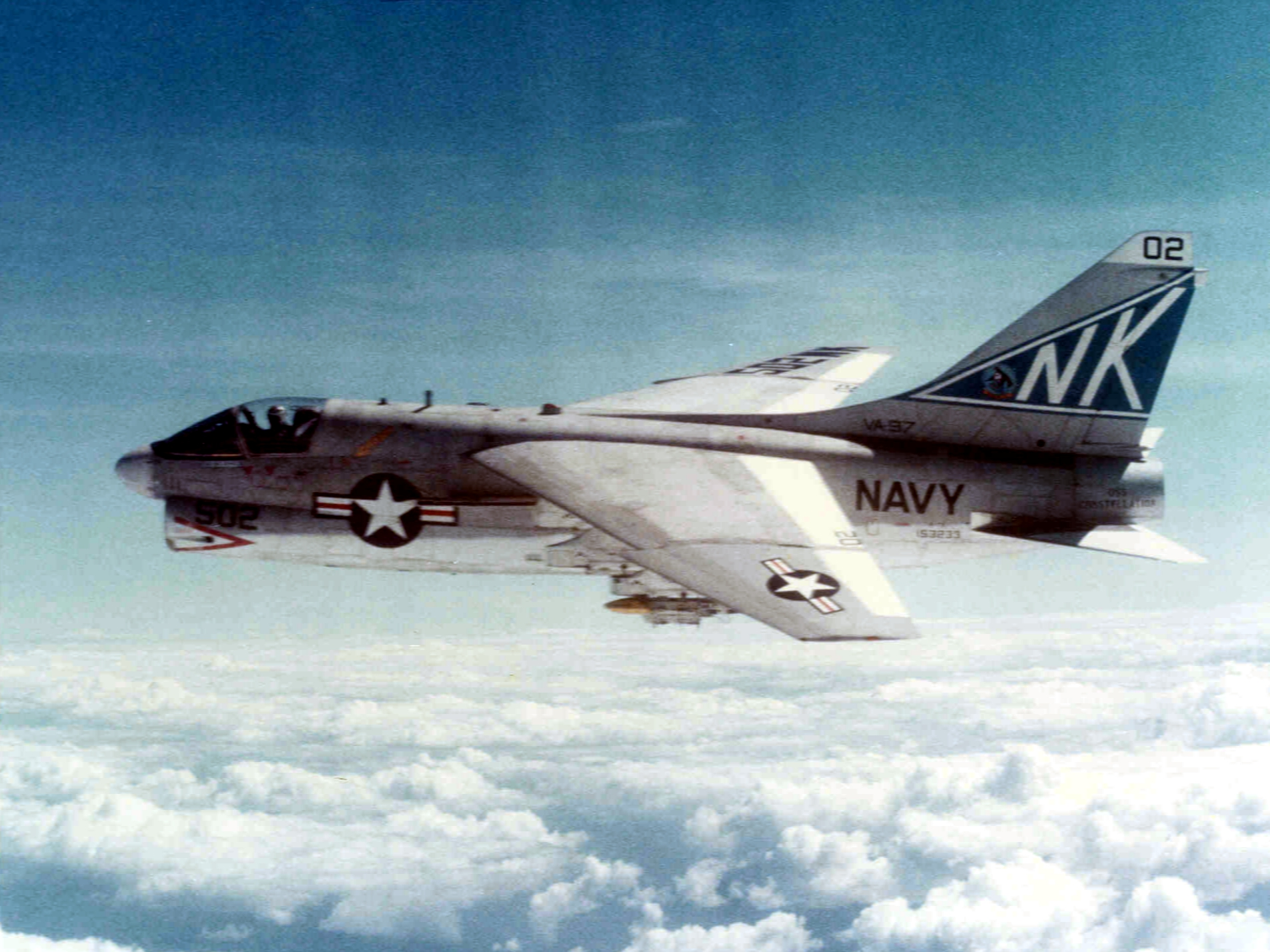
VA-97 A-7A over the Gulf of Tonkin in 1968

=== 1970s ===
On 4 February 1971, the squadron embarked on USS Enterprise at Naval Station Norfolk, Virginia (USA), for her transit around South America to her new home port of Alameda, California. The squadron's third deployment began in June 1971, embarked on USS Enterprise. In December of that year following the outbreak of the 1971 Indo-Pakistani War, USS Enterprise was ordered to leave Yankee Station for the Indian Ocean. The carrier, with VA-97 embarked, operated in the Bay of Bengal until the cessation of hostilities in the latter part of December. After returning to Alameda and a short turn-around period, the squadron again returned to WESTPAC in September 1972, there they participated in Operation Linebacker and Operation Linebacker II in October and December, respectively. In April 1975, the squadron participated in Operation Frequent Wind and provided air support for the evacuation of American and Vietnamese personnel during the Fall of Saigon.

In March 1976, VA-97 achieved the "Triple Crown" of Naval Aviation awards, earning the Wade McClusky Award as the U.S. Navy's top Attack Squadron, the CNO Aviation Safety Award (also known as the Safety "S”), and the Pacific Fleet Battle Efficiency Award (also known as the Battle "E"). The squadron began their sixth deployment in July 1976 once again embarked on Enterprise with CVW-14. The squadron's return to NAS Lemoore in May 1977 marked the completion of five years and over 25,000 hours of mishap-free flying in the A-7, making VA-97 the first squadron to achieve that mark. Their seventh deployment began in April 1978 aboard Enterprise. In May of that year the squadron surpassed six years and over 30,000 hours of mishap-free flying.

The eighth deployment began in November 1979, embarked on USS Coral Sea, with most of the deployment spent on "Gonzo Station" off the southern coast of Iran.

=== 1980s ===
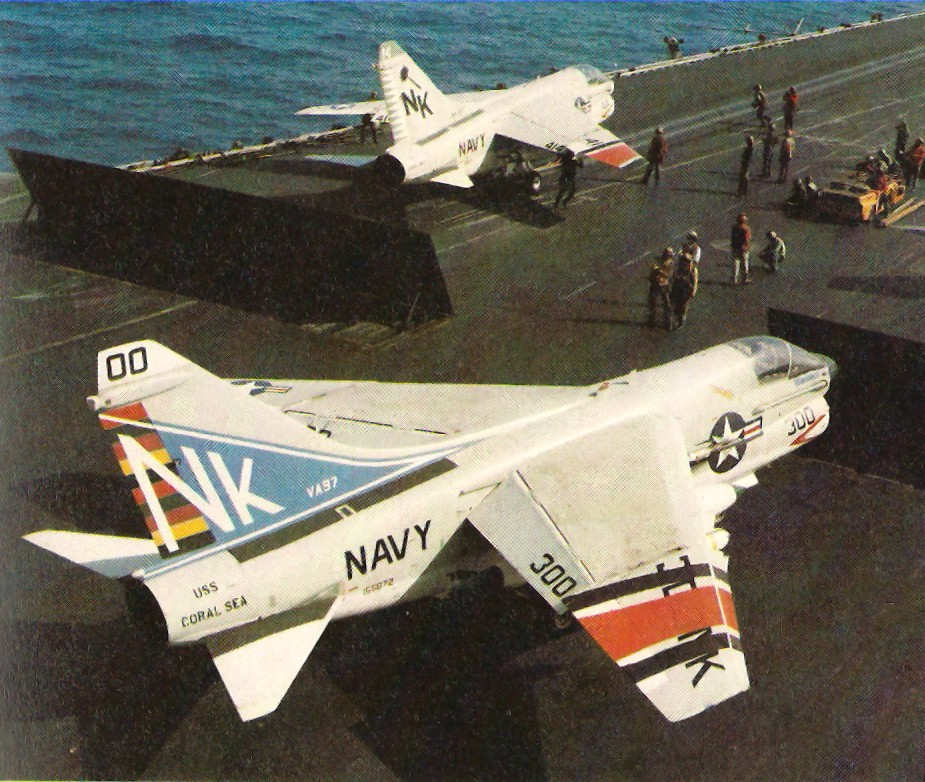
VA-97 A-7E on USS Coral Sea during Operation Eagle Claw in April 1980

In April 1980 while embarked on Coral Sea, VA-97 was part of the task force involved in supporting Operation Eagle Claw, the Iranian hostage rescue attempt. Coral Sea was the squadron's home for deployment nine in August 1981, and again for deployment ten in March 1983, when they sailed around the world. In 1984, VA-97 was reassigned to CVW-15. The squadron's eleventh deployment departed NAS Alameda in October 1984 on USS Carl Vinson, then the U.S. Navy's newest carrier. The squadron participated in FLEETEX 85, involving five carrier battle groups and sixty-five ships from various countries. The 12th deployment began in August 1986 operating from USS Carl Vinson above the Aleutian Islands Chain in the Bering Sea, both on the way to WESTPAC and on the return trip. The squadron returned home in February 1987. The 13th deployment began in June 1988 and included support of Operation Earnest Will convoys in the Gulf of Oman and the Straits of Hormuz. In July 1988 during the 1988 Summer Olympics in Seoul, Korea, USS Carl Vinson operated off the coast of Korea. The deployment ended with the squadron winning the Battle Efficiency Award. In 1989, the squadron earned the LTJG Bruce Carrier Memorial Award for Maintenance Excellence and the Chief of Naval Operations Aviation Safety "S" award.

=== 1990s ===
Throughout the 1990s, the squadron supported United Nations coalition forces by participating in Operation Southern Watch in Iraq. They also flew in support of Operation Restore Hope in Somalia. In 1990 the squadron completed their 15th and last WESTPAC deployment in the A-7 Corsair. On 24 January 1991, VA-97 was redesignated Strike Fighter Squadron 97 (VFA-97) and transitioned to the F/A-18A Hornet. That summer, the squadron flew to NAS Norfolk and embarked USS Kitty Hawk for her transit around Cape Horn. In late 1992, the squadron deployed to the WESTPAC in support of Operation Southern Watch (OSW) over Iraq as well as Operation Restore Hope in Somalia. The squadron returned to NAS Lemoore in May 1993.

In June 1994, the squadron began their 17th cruise. This was their last cruise as a member of CVW-15. During the cruise on 18 November, BuNo 162827, one of the F/A-18As, crashed on take off from the Kitty Hawk, the pilot ejecting. The cruise also saw VFA-97 as well as the rest of CVW-15 provide contingency operations during the 1994 North Korean nuclear crisis.

In October 1995 the squadron joined CVW-11 aboard USS Kitty Hawk, deploying in support of OSW. The squadron was awarded the 1996 Battle "E", the LTJG Bruce Carrier Award for maintenance excellence, and the Scott Kirby Award for ordnance excellence.In December 1997 CVW-11 and the squadron were assigned to USS Carl Vinson, deploying on 10 November 1998 for their 19th deployment, again to the Western Pacific. The squadron flew combat missions supporting Operation Desert Fox and OSW, returning to NAS Lemoore in May 1999.

=== 2000s ===
The squadron deployed in late July 2001 aboard Carl Vinson. After the September 11 attacks, the carrier and her air wing rushed to the North Arabian Sea and conducted sustained combat operations in support of Operation Enduring Freedom. The squadron completed over 3,000 flight hours, 1,340 sorties, and a 99 percent combat sortie completion rate, delivering over 453,000 pounds of ordnance in a ten-week period in support of Operation Enduring Freedom.

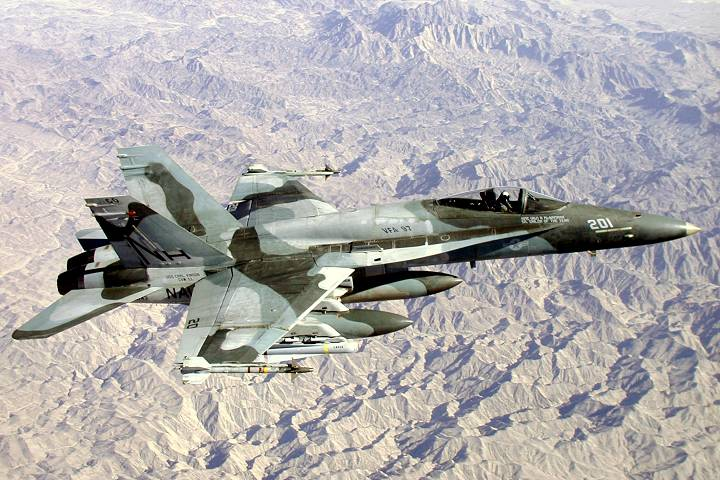
An VFA-97 F/A-18A Hornet with AGM-65 Mavericks missiles.

After returning to Lemoore, their efforts were recognized with the 2001 Battle "E", the 2001 Captain Michael J. Estocin Award and the Chief of Naval Operations Safety "S”, resulting in the so-called "triple-crown" achievement for the Warhawks. In 2003, the squadron, attached to CVW-11, embarked on USS Nimitz and flew hundreds of combat sorties in support of Operation Iraqi Freedom. This marked the final time the F-18A's would be used in combat. After return from deployment, the squadron transitioned from the F/A-18A to the F/A-18C and began preparation for their upcoming Unit Deployment Program (UDP) deployment. In 2004, VFA-97 was assigned to Marine Aircraft Group 12 as the first Navy squadron to take part in the UDP deploying to MCAS Iwakuni, Japan. The squadron deployed to MCAS Iwakuni again in 2006 for their second UDP deployment, and again in January 2008 for their third UDP and 24th overall deployment. The squadron rejoined CVW-11 and Nimitz on return from Iwakuni and began a compressed turnaround for deployment on board Nimitz. In February 2009, VFA-97 embarked on the USS Nimitz, officially ending their 5-year departure from a Carrier Air Wing. In July 2009 they departed for an 8-month deployment aboard Nimitz.

=== 2010s ===
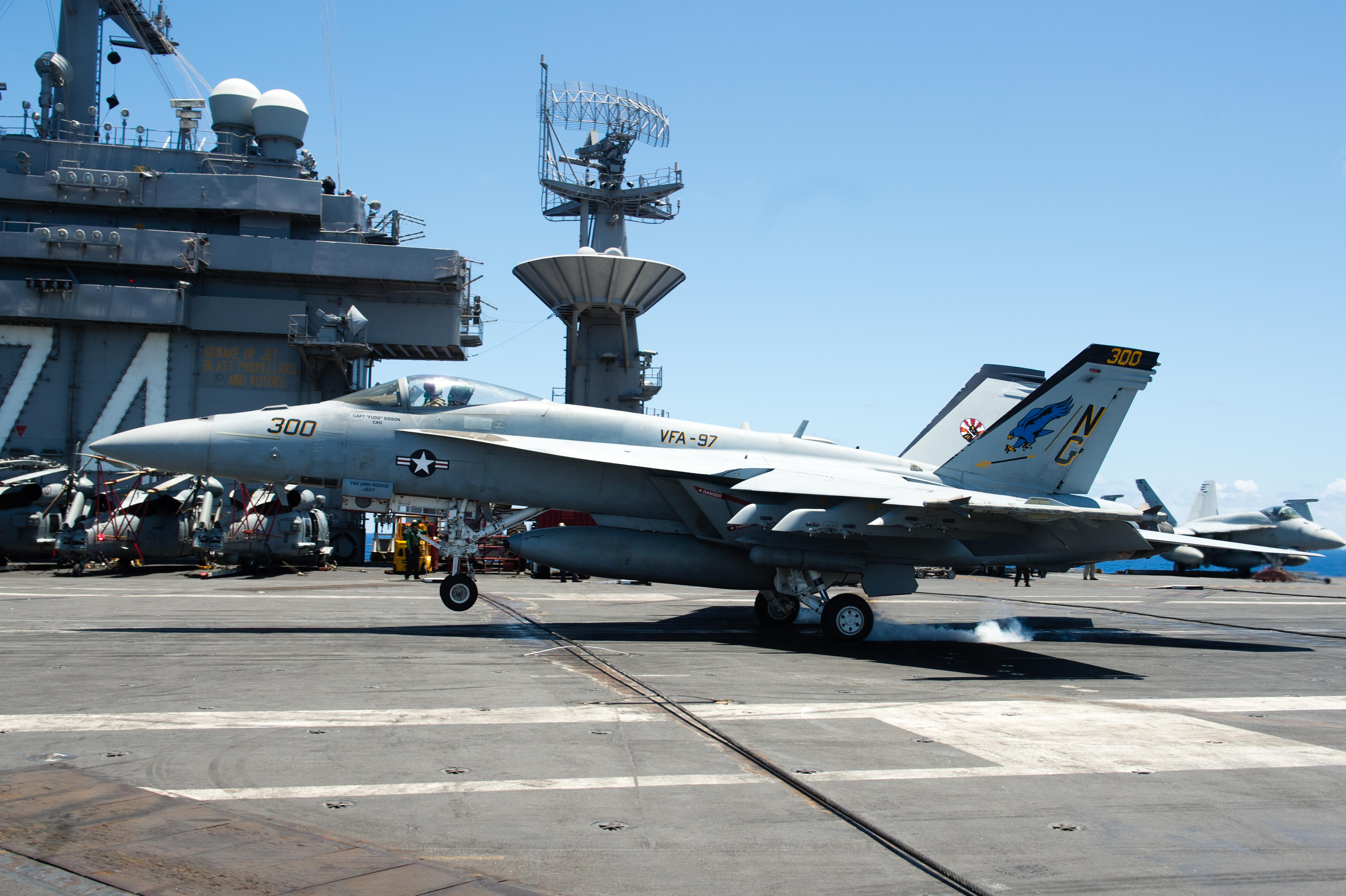
VFA-97 F/A-18E makes touch-and-go landing on USS John C. Stennis in July 2016.

In late 2013 VFA-97 started transitioning to the F/A-18E Super Hornet and as of 2015 was operational. In 2019, the squadron returned to NAS Lemoore from an around the world deployment that included operations in 3rd Fleet, 7th Fleet, 5th Fleet, 6th Fleet and 2nd Fleet. VFA-97 supported combat operations in Afghanistan and Iraq/Syria as part of Operations Freedom Sentinel / Resolute Support and Inherent Resolve / Deliberate Resolve. As of 1 July, the squadron was temporarily assigned duties as an aggressor squadron and remained with CVW-9. In September 2019, it was announced that VFA-97 had been selected as the next squadron to transition to the F-35C Lightning II in early 2021.

In December 2019, VFA-97 was reassigned to CVW-8 aboard the USS Gerald R. Ford.

=== 2020s ===
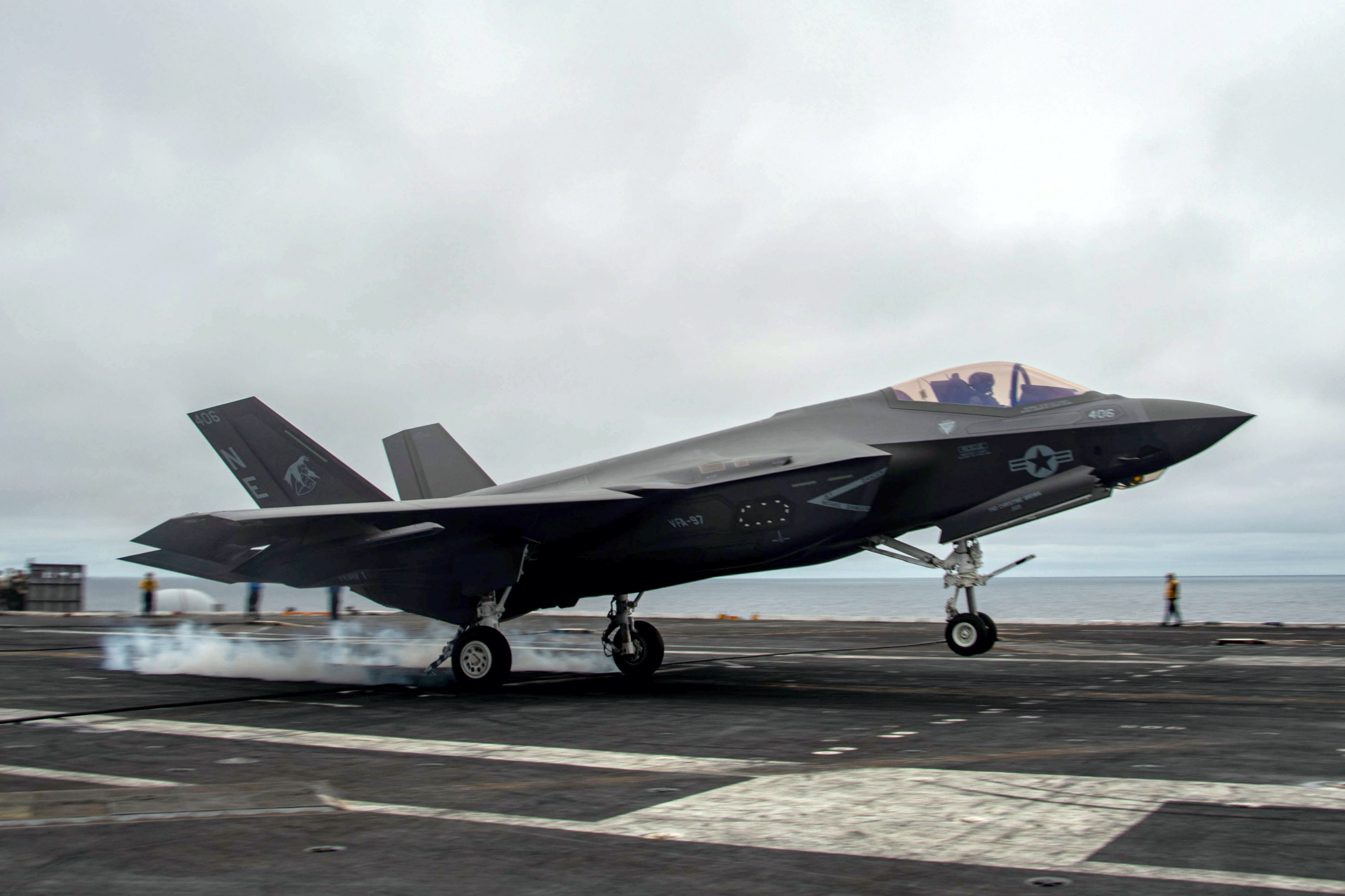
A VFA-97 F-35C lands aboard USS Nimitz, 14 July 2022. Note CVW-2 tail code "NE".

The squadron received its first F-35C in October 2021 and was reassigned to CVW-2.

In mid November 2024, VFA-97 and their F-35Cs departed the US as part of CVW-2 on a scheduled deployment aboard the USS Carl Vinson

Following multiple exercises with Pacific Rim militaries, VFA-97 and CVW-2 were ordered to operate in the Red Sea in defense of international shipping lanes and Israel against Houthi/Iran proxy military unit attacks from Yemen.

VFA-97 and CVW-2 arrived in the CENTCOM AOR in early April 2025 with extensive combat operations against the Houthis/Iranians commencing upon arrival to the region.

Navy officials reported that F-35C's from VFA-97 have been helping out in shooting down Houthi drones in the region. This would mark the first time F-35C's from the US Navy, not the Marine Corps, have been used in combat.

== Awards ==
VFA-97 has won the Wade McClusky Award, three Safety "S" awards, two LTJG Bruce Carrier Memorial Awards for Maintenance Excellence, two Scott Kirby Awards for ordnance excellence, and two Captain Michael J. Estocin Awards, twice achieving the "Triple Crown". Additionally, VFA-97 earned a Joint Meritorious Unit Award, three Navy Unit Commendations, eight Meritorious Unit Commendations, six Battle "E" awards, two Navy Expeditionary Service Medals, three National Defense Service Medals, two Armed Forces Terrorism Service and Expeditionary Medals, Humanitarian Service Medal and 24 Sea Service Deployment Ribbons.

== See also ==
- Naval aviation
- Modern US Navy carrier air operations
- List of United States Navy aircraft squadrons
