= VFA-137 =

Strike Fighter Squadron 137
- Active: 2 July 1985 – present
- Country: United States
- Branch: United States Navy
- Type: Fighter/Attack
- Role: Close air support Air interdiction Aerial reconnaissance
- Part of: None
- Garrison/HQ: NAS Lemoore
- Nickname: Kestrels

Commanders
- Commanding Officer: CDR Tony Kopp
- Executive Officer: CDR Justin Chalkley
- Command Master Chief: CMDCM Andre Delarosa

Aircraft flown
- Fighter: F/A-18 Hornet; F/A-18E Super Hornet

Strike Fighter Squadron 137 (VFA-137), also known as the "Kestrels", are a United States Navy F/A-18E Super Hornet strike fighter squadron stationed at Naval Air Station Lemoore, California. Their radio callsign is "Falcon".

== History ==
=== 1980s ===
Strike Fighter Squadron 137 was established on 2 July 1985. They received their first Lot VIII F/A-18A Hornet on 25 November 1985 and in October 1986 the squadron was awarded the Silver Anchor for new construction squadrons. In the course of their 23-year history, they have a safety record that includes over 90,000 mishap-free flight hours.

In 1987–1988 the squadron made its first deployment to the Mediterranean Sea embarked on the aircraft carrier USS Coral Sea, as part of Carrier Air Wing Thirteen. That year the squadron was recognized with the Commander Naval Air Forces, U.S. Atlantic Fleet Battle “E” award.

In August 1989, the squadron was back on board USS Coral Sea patrolling the Eastern Mediterranean in response to Colonel Higgins' murder in Lebanon, winning the Golden Tailhook award on their second deployment.

=== 1990s ===
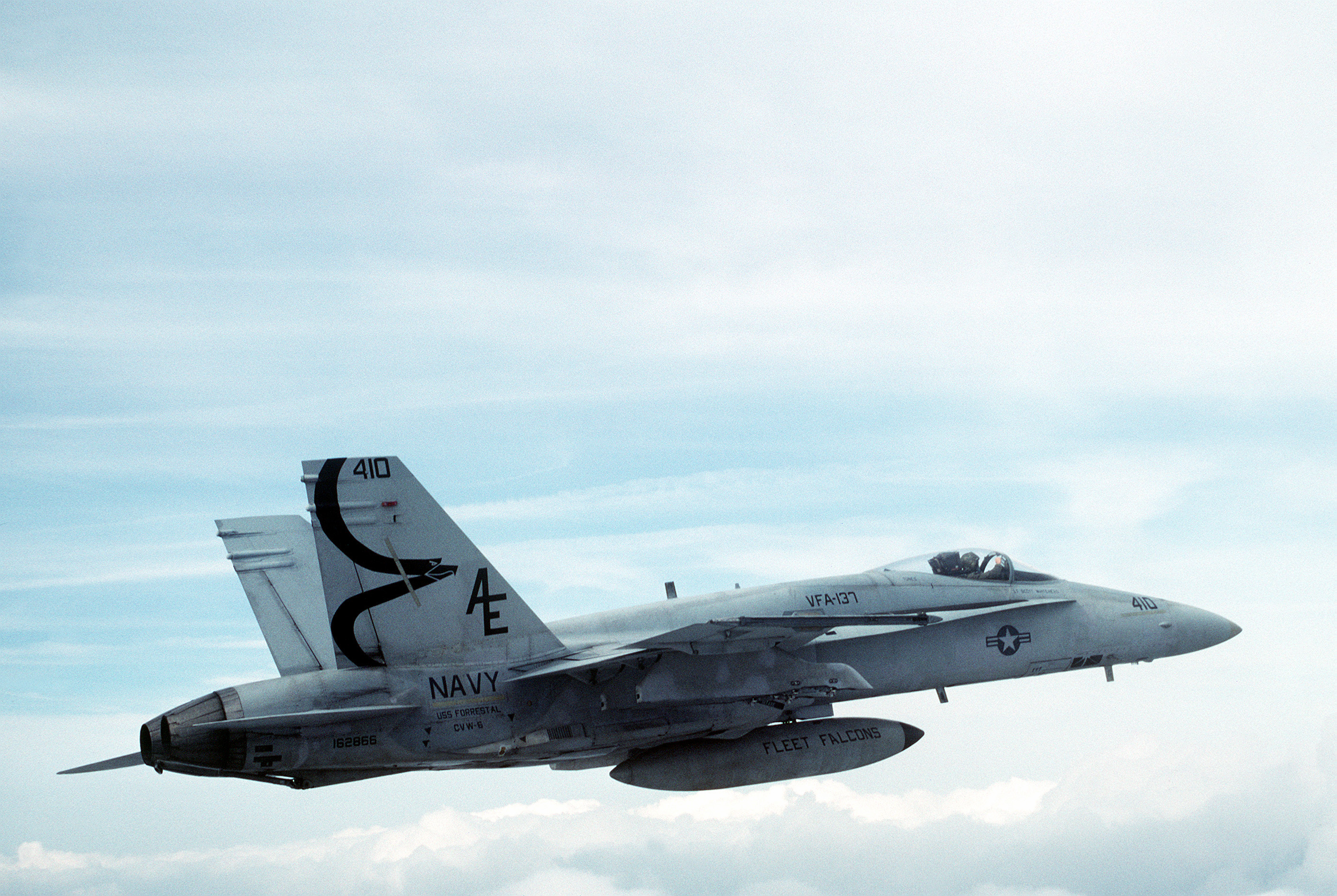
VFA-137 F/A-18A assigned to USS Forrestal in 1991

In October 1990, the squadron transferred to Carrier Air Wing Six on board USS Forrestal, completing an accelerated work up cycle and their third deployment. On cruise, the squadron flew sorties over Iraq in support of Operation Provide Comfort and won two more Tailhook Awards.

In September 1992, the squadron completed a homeport change to NAS Lemoore and transitioned to the night attack capable Lot 15 F/A-18C. In May 1993, the squadron joined Carrier Air Wing Two (CVW-2) and embarked on board USS Constellation for their first Western Pacific deployment in November 1994. On this deployment, and the 1997 deployment, the squadron patrolled the skies over Iraq, enforcing the United Nations no-fly zone in support of Operation Southern Watch. In 1999 and again in 2001, VFA-137 employed precision-guided ordnance against Iraq as part of a Coalition Forces response to repeated violations of the no-fly zone.

=== 2000s ===
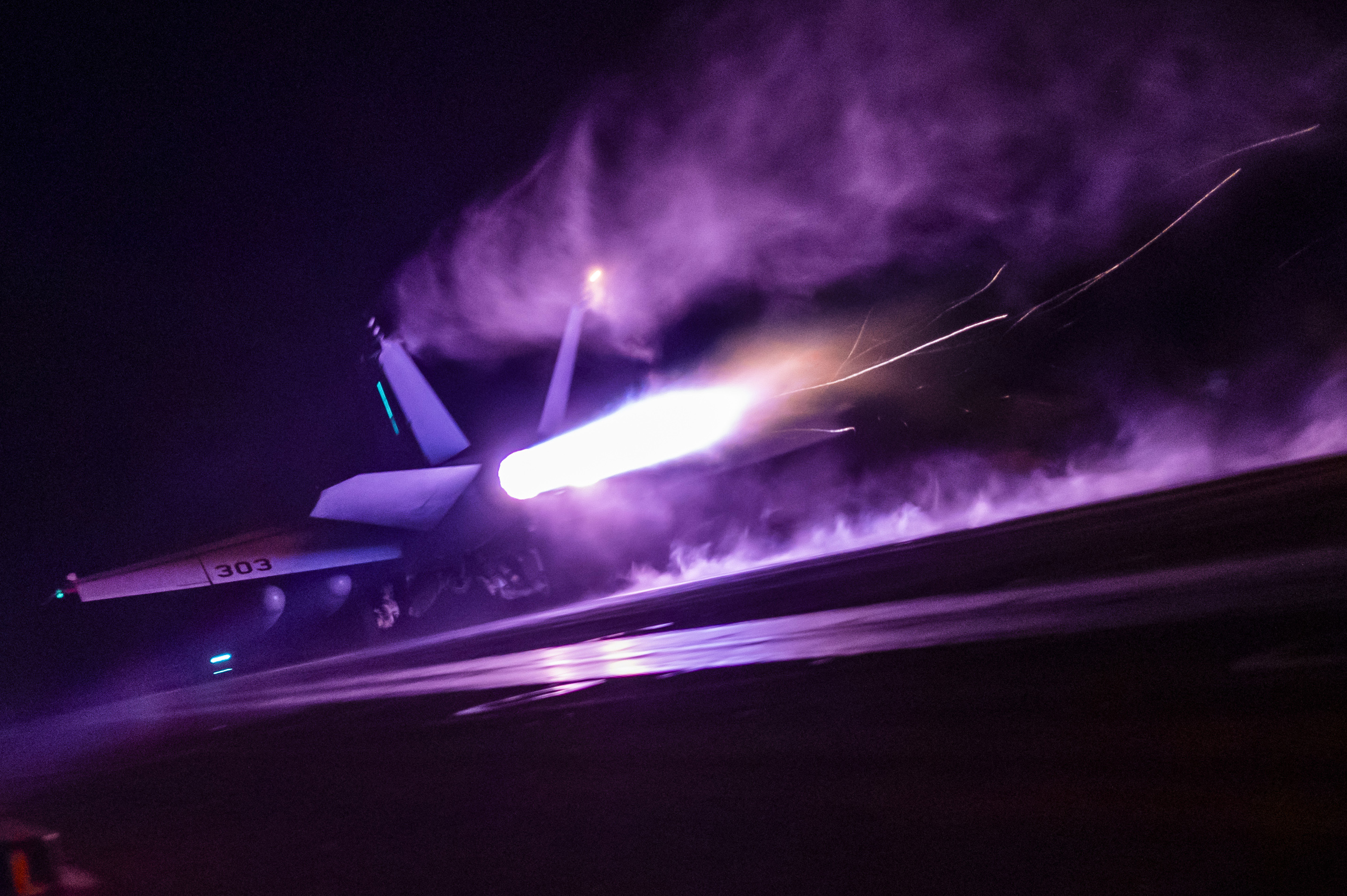
Night launch: An F/A-18E Super Hornet from the VFA-137 launches from the flight deck of the aircraft carrier USS Nimitz in the Philippine Sea. (April 23, 2025)

In November 2002, VFA-137 deployed to the Persian Gulf on board USS Constellation for her final deployment. The squadron participated in extensive operations in the skies over Iraq, initially in support of Operation Southern Watch, and then in combat operations during Operation Iraqi Freedom. During the course of the conflict, the squadron flew over 500 combat sorties and dropped more than 300,000 pounds of precision-guided ordnance.

The squadron returned home in June 2003, and began the transition to the new Lot 25 F/A-18E Super Hornet. After completing the Safe for Flight certification, they became the third F/A-18E squadron in the U.S. Navy. In April 2004, Commander, Naval Air Force, U.S. Pacific Fleet awarded the Battle "E" for calendar year 2003. Subsequently, Commander, Naval Air Force awarded the 2003 Captain Michael J. Estocin Award for exceptional operational performance and flight safety.

VFA-137 embarked aboard USS Abraham Lincoln for a Western Pacific deployment in October 2004, participating in Operation Unified Assistance, the humanitarian relief effort to aid the victims of the tsunami that struck Southeast Asia. In March 2006, the squadron again deployed with CVW 2 aboard USS Abraham Lincoln for a 5-month WestPac. The deployment included port calls in Hong Kong, Thailand, Singapore and Sasebo, Japan, and was marked by participation in Exercises Foal Eagle, Valiant Shield, and RIMPAC. Between 24–31 March 2006, during Foal Eagle 2006 exercises, strike squadrons VFA-2, VFA-34, VFA-137, and VFA-151 from CVW-2 teamed with U.S. Air Force aircraft from the 18th Wing based at Kadena Air Base to provide combat air patrols and coordinated bombing runs via the exercise's Combined Air Operations Center. VFA-137 returned from deployment in August 2006.

After a work-up cycle that included 2 detachments to NAS Fallon and 3 underway periods on board USS Abraham Lincoln, VFA-137 deployed to the western Pacific on USS Abraham Lincoln in March 2008. Following 7 months at sea, including 5 months in the Persian Gulf supporting Operations Iraqi Freedom and Enduring Freedom, the squadron returned home in October 2008.

On 15 March 2010, two VFA-137 aircraft were involved in a mid-air collision while training at NAS Fallon. Both pilots survived with one managing to land his plane, while the other pilot ejected and was rescued by helicopter. An investigation determined that pilot error was to blame for the collision. The responsible pilot's name was redacted from the report released to the public.

In 2019, the squadron was transferred to Carrier Air Wing 17 thus swapping with VFA-113.

== See also ==
- List of inactive United States Navy aircraft squadrons
- List of United States Navy aircraft squadrons
- Modern United States Navy carrier air operations
- Naval aviation
