= Naval Air Station Lemoore =

Military airport in California, US

- Reeves Field
- Near Lemoore, California in the United States
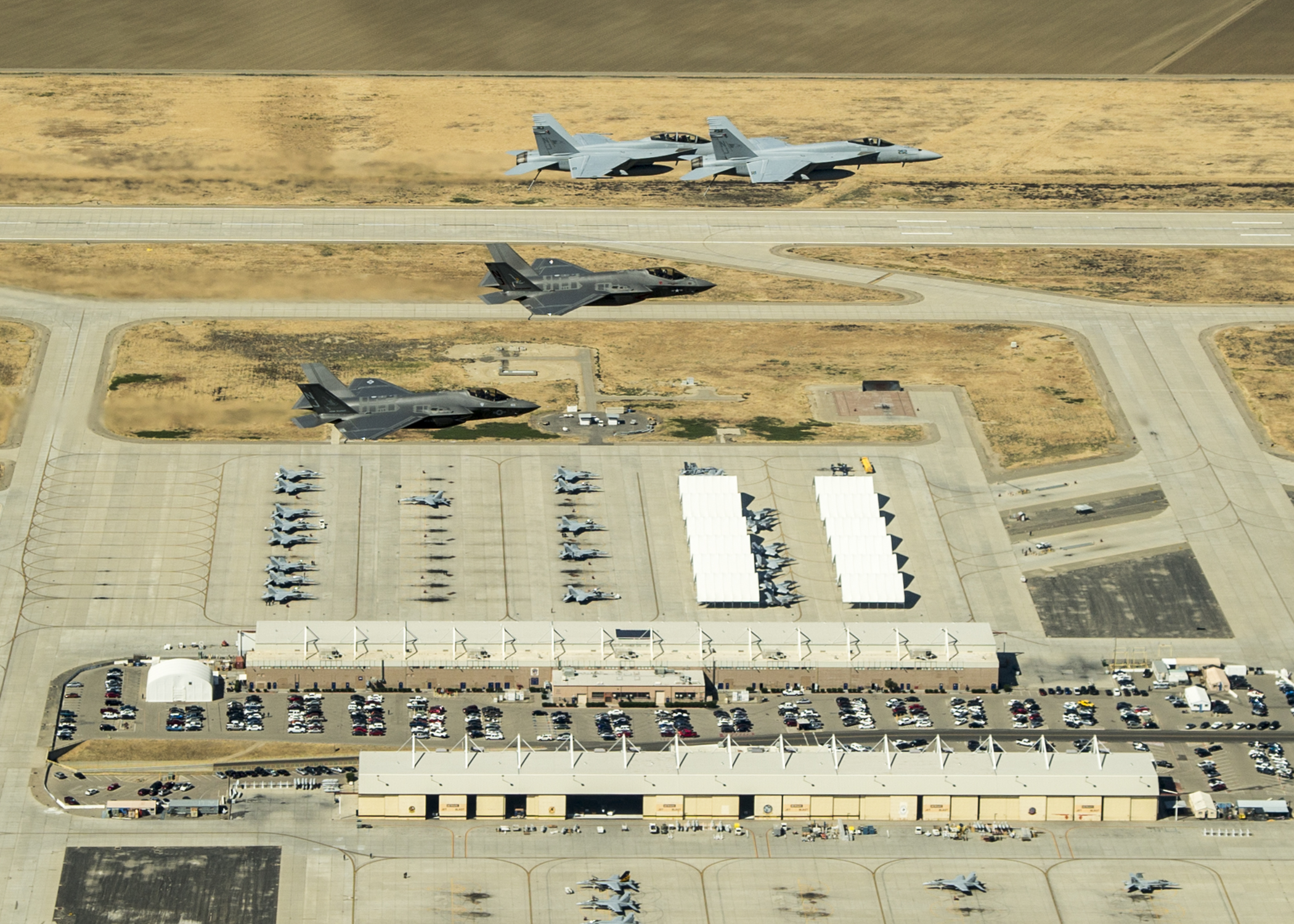
- Two F-35C Lightning II from VFA-101 fly in formation with F/A-18E/F Super Hornets of VFA-122 over NAS Lemoore in 2015.

Site information
- Type: Naval Air Station (Master jet base)
- Owner: Department of Defense
- Operator: US Navy
- Controlled by: Navy Region Southwest
- Condition: Operational
- Website: Official website

Location
- Location in the United States
- Coordinates: 36°19′59″N 119°57′07″W

Site history
- Built: 1961
- In use: 1961 – present

Garrison information
- Current commander: Captain Douglas M. Peterson
- Garrison: Strike Fighter Wing Pacific

Airfield information
- Identifiers: IATA: NLC, ICAO: KNLC, FAA LID: NLC, WMO: 747020
- Elevation: 65.2 meters (214 ft) AMSL
Runways
| Direction | Length and surface |
|---|---|
| 14L/32R | 4,115.4 meters (13,502 ft) Concrete |
| 14R/32L | 4,115.1 meters (13,501 ft) Concrete |

Naval Air Station Lemoore or NAS Lemoore (IATA: NLC, ICAO: KNLC, FAA LID: NLC) is a United States Navy base, located in Kings County and Fresno County, California, United States. Lemoore Station, a census-designated place, is located inside the base's borders.

NAS Lemoore is the Navy's newest and largest master jet base. Strike Fighter Wing Pacific, along with its associated squadrons, is home ported there.

NAS Lemoore also hosts four carrier air wings: Carrier Air Wing Two (CVW-2), Carrier Air Wing Nine (CVW-9), Carrier Air Wing Eleven (CVW-11), and Carrier Air Wing Seventeen (CVW-17).

== History ==
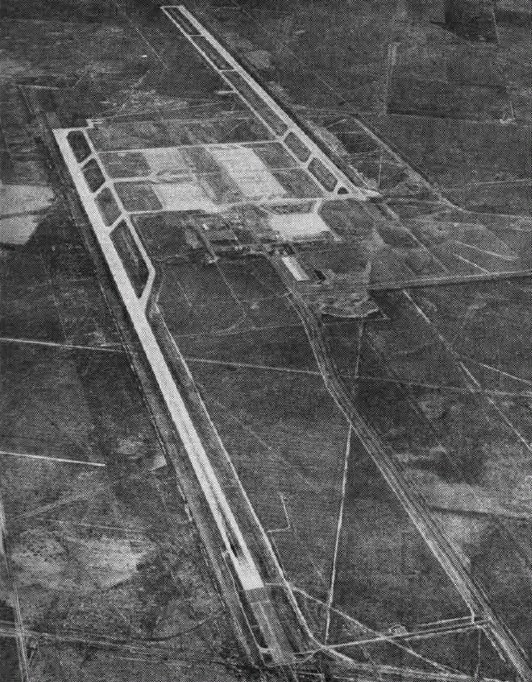
Aerial view of NAS Lemoore in the early 1960s

Commissioned in 1961, NAS Lemoore, as seen from an aircraft flying above, looks significant and stands out from the farmlands of Central California, due to its large construction. It is the newest and largest master jet base of the U.S. Navy. It has two offset parallel runways 4,600 feet (1,400 m) apart. Aircraft parking and maintenance hangars are aligned between the 13,500-foot (4,100 m) runways. Separated from the hangars by underpasses beneath taxiways A and C, the remainder of the air operations area is located directly to the southeast.

In July 1998, NAS Lemoore was selected as the West Coast site for the Navy's newest strike-fighter aircraft, the F/A-18E/F Super Hornet. This decision brought approximately 92 additional aircraft, 1,850 additional active duty personnel and 3,000 family members to NAS Lemoore, and several associated facility additions or improvements.

The Navy also brought four new fleet squadrons to NAS Lemoore from 2001 to 2004. Additional military staffing was required at the Aircraft Intermediate Maintenance Department, Strike Fighter Weapons School Pacific, and Center for Naval Aviation Technical Training Unit Lemoore (CNATTU Lemoore) to support this effort. Originally, the officer in charge of construction for building the base was Commander Dennis K. Culp CEC/USN, the first Naval officer in Lemoore.

On 31 March 2016, two civilians were killed when the Jeep Grand Cherokee they were driving collided with a parked F/A-18 on the base's tarmac. The vehicle had been pursued by the California Highway Patrol (CHP) and entered the base without being stopped by base security. A CHP helicopter monitoring the pursuit recorded the incident using FLIR, capturing radio communications in which base tower personnel asked whether the vehicle had entered the base and a CHP dispatcher confirmed that it had. The vehicle then proceeded onto a darkened section of the tarmac without its lights on before colliding with the parked aircraft. The aircraft's left tail surface cut into the passenger compartment of the vehicle.

== Current operations ==
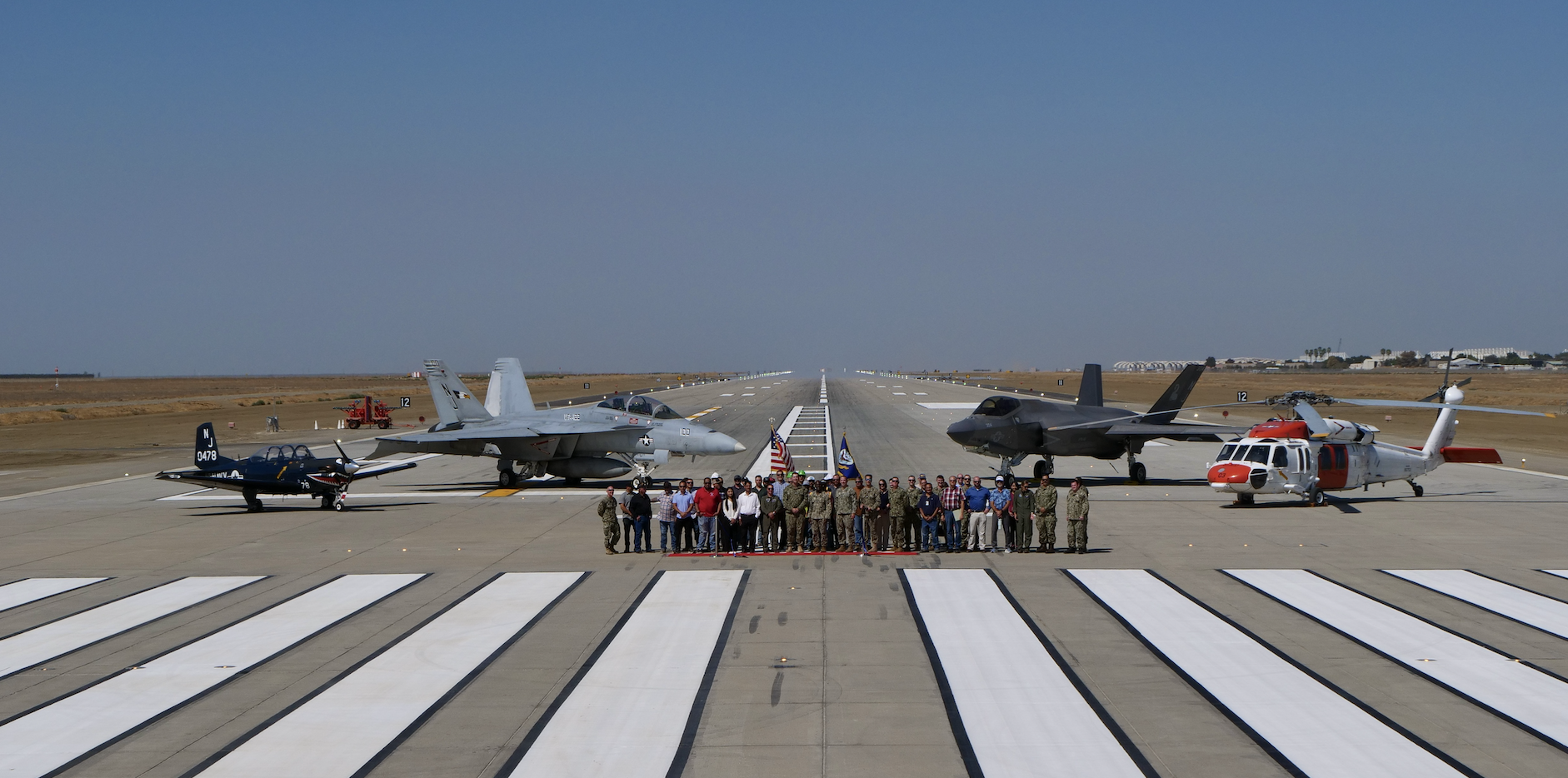
The various naval aircraft stationed at NAS Lemoore, 2024

With the transfer of NAS Miramar to the United States Marine Corps, NAS Lemoore now hosts the Navy's entire west coast fighter/attack capability. NAS Lemoore was built "from the ground up" as a Master Jet Base, and has several operational advantages, and relatively few constraints, as a result.

Strike Fighter Wing Pacific with its supporting facilities is home ported here. The primary aircraft based at NAS Lemoore are the F/A-18E/F Super Hornet since 1999 and the F-35C Lightning II since 2017, operating from 16 Fleet [operational] Squadrons and 2 Fleet Replacement Squadrons.

Lemoore is home to aircraft assigned to the following Carrier Air Wings:

- Carrier Air Wing Two (CVW-2), assigned to USS Carl Vinson (CVN-70)
- Carrier Air Wing Three (CVW-3), assigned to USS Dwight D. Eisenhower (CVN-69)
- Carrier Air Wing Nine (CVW-9), assigned to USS Abraham Lincoln (CVN-72)
- Carrier Air Wing Eleven (CVW-11), assigned to USS Theodore Roosevelt (CVN-71)
- Carrier Air Wing Seventeen (CVW-17), assigned to USS Nimitz (CVN-68)

== Based flying units ==
Flying units based at NAS Lemoore.

=== United States Navy ===
Commander, Naval Air Forces, Pacific

== Tenant squadrons ==
| Insignia | Squadron | Code | Callsign/Nickname | Assigned aircraft | Operational assignment | Administrative assignment |
|---|---|---|---|---|---|---|
| | Strike Fighter Squadron 2 | VFA-2 | Bounty Hunters | F/A-18F Super Hornet | Carrier Air Wing Two | Commander, Strike Fighter Wing Pacific (COMSTRKFIGHTWINGPAC) |
| | Strike Fighter Squadron 14 | VFA-14 | Tophatters | F/A-18E Super Hornet | Carrier Air Wing Nine | Commander, Strike Fighter Wing Pacific (COMSTRKFIGHTWINGPAC) |
| | Strike Fighter Squadron 22 | VFA-22 | Fighting Redcocks | F/A-18F Super Hornet | Carrier Air Wing Seventeen | Commander, Strike Fighter Wing Pacific (COMSTRKFIGHTWINGPAC) |
| | Strike Fighter Squadron 25 | VFA-25 | Fist of the Fleet | F/A-18E Super Hornet | Carrier Air Wing Eleven | Commander, Strike Fighter Wing Pacific (COMSTRKFIGHTWINGPAC) |
| | Strike Fighter Squadron 41 | VFA-41 | Black Aces | F/A-18F Super Hornet | Carrier Air Wing Nine | Commander, Strike Fighter Wing Pacific (COMSTRKFIGHTWINGPAC) |
| | Strike Fighter Squadron 86 | VFA-86 | Sidewinders | F-35C Lightning II | Carrier Air Wing Eleven | Commander, Joint Strike Fighter Wing (COMJSFWING) |
| | Strike Fighter Squadron 94 | VFA-94 | Mighty Shrikes | F/A-18E Super Hornet | Carrier Air Wing Seventeen | Commander, Strike Fighter Wing Pacific (COMSTRKFIGHTWINGPAC) |
| | Strike Fighter Squadron 97 | VFA-97 | Warhawks | F-35C Lightning II | Carrier Air Wing Two | Commander, Joint Strike Fighter Wing (COMJSFWING) |
| | Strike Fighter Squadron 113 | VFA-113 | Stingers | F/A-18E Super Hornet | Carrier Air Wing Two | Commander, Strike Fighter Wing Pacific (COMSTRKFIGHTWINGPAC) |
| | Strike Fighter Squadron 122 | VFA-122 | Flying Eagles | F/A-18E/F Super Hornet | Fleet Replacement Squadron (FRS) | Commander, Strike Fighter Wing Pacific (COMSTRKFIGHTWINGPAC) |
| | Strike Fighter Squadron 125 | VFA-125 | Rough Raiders | F-35C Lightning II | Fleet Replacement Squadron (FRS) | Commander, Joint Strike Fighter Wing (COMJSFWING) |
| | Strike Fighter Squadron 136 | VFA-136 | Knighthawks | F/A-18E Super Hornet | Carrier Air Wing Three | Commander, Strike Fighter Wing Pacific (COMSTRKFIGHTWINGPAC) |
| | Strike Fighter Squadron 137 | VFA-137 | Kestrels | F/A-18E Super Hornet | Carrier Air Wing Seventeen | Commander, Strike Fighter Wing Pacific (COMSTRKFIGHTWINGPAC) |
| | Strike Fighter Squadron 146 | VFA-146 | Blue Diamonds | F/A-18E Super Hornet | Carrier Air Wing Seventeen | Commander, Strike Fighter Wing Pacific (COMSTRKFIGHTWINGPAC) |
| | Strike Fighter Squadron 115 | VFA-115 | Eagles | F-35C Lightning II | Commander, Joint Strike Fighter Wing (COMJSFWING) | Commander, Joint Strike Fighter Wing (COMJSFWING) |
| | Strike Fighter Squadron 151 | VFA-151 | Vigilantes | F/A-18E Super Hornet | Carrier Air Wing Nine | Commander, Strike Fighter Wing Pacific (COMSTRKFIGHTWINGPAC) |
| | Strike Fighter Squadron 154 | VFA-154 | Black Knights | F/A-18F Super Hornet | Carrier Air Wing Eleven | Commander, Strike Fighter Wing Pacific (COMSTRKFIGHTWINGPAC) |
| | Strike Fighter Squadron 192 | VFA-192 | World Famous Golden Dragons | F/A-18E Super Hornet | Carrier Air Wing Two | Commander, Strike Fighter Wing Pacific (COMSTRKFIGHTWINGPAC) |
| | Station SAR Lemoore | STASAR Lemoore | Wranglers | MH-60S Seahawk "Knighthawk" | Naval Air Station Lemoore (NASL) | Commander, Helicopter Sea Combat Wing Pacific (COMSEACOMBATWINGPAC) |
| | Strike Fighter Weapons School Pacific | SFWSPAC | | F/A-18E/F Super Hornet | Commander, Strike Fighter Wing Pacific (COMSTRKFIGHTWINGPAC) | Commander, Strike Fighter Wing Pacific (COMSTRKFIGHTWINGPAC) |
| | Fleet Readiness Center West | FRCW | | | Naval Air Station Lemoore (NASL) | Commander, Fleet Readiness Centers (COMFRC) |

== Other tenant activities ==
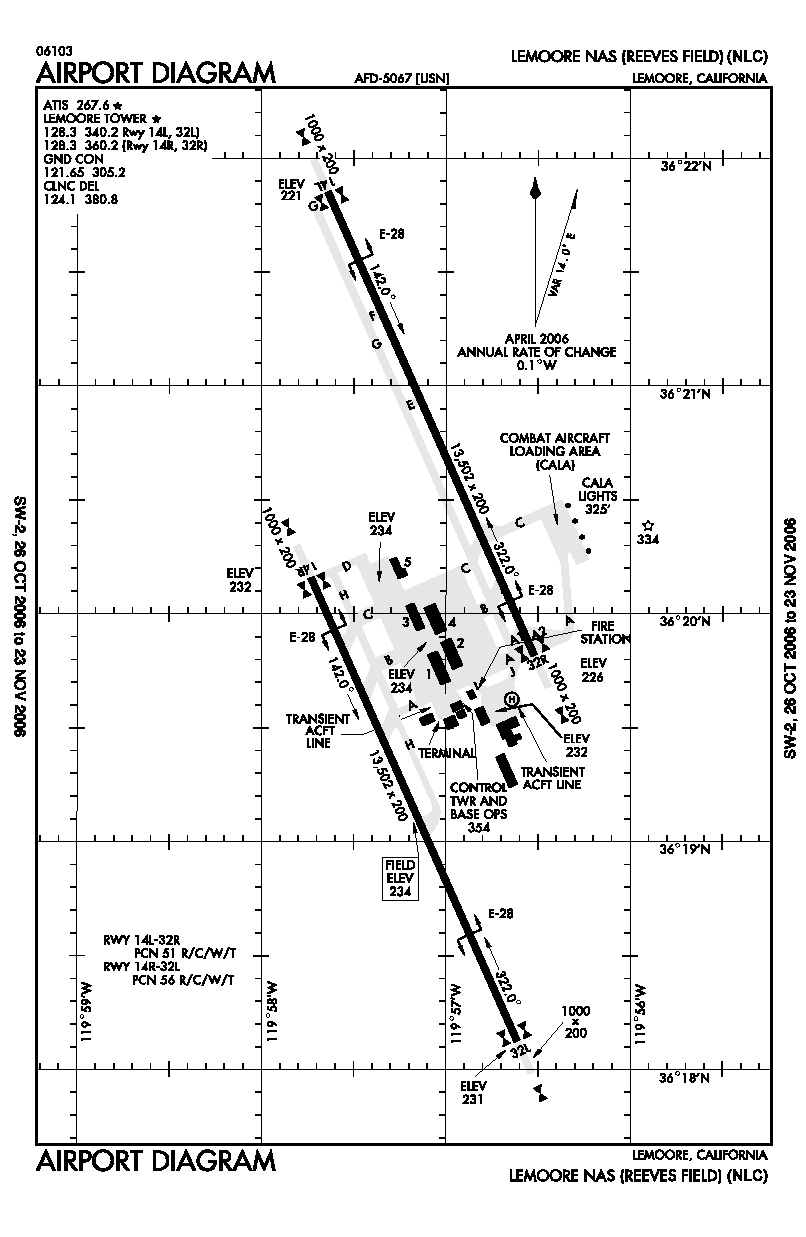
FAA airport diagram

- Fleet Logistics Center San Diego, Det Lemoore
- Fleet Aviation Specialized Operational Training Group, Pacific Fleet
- Naval Air Technical Services Facility Detachment
- Naval Aviation Engineering Service Unit
- Naval Air Maintenance Training Group
- Naval Hospital
- Naval Branch Dental Clinic
- Naval Training Systems Center
- Trainer Systems Support Activity
- Navy Operational Support Center (formerly Naval Air Reserve Center)
- Naval Criminal Investigative Service NCISRA
- Naval Legal Service Office, Southwest Branch Office
- Aviation Survival Training Center
- NATEC, Naval Air Technical Data and Engineering Service Command
- NAFC, Naval Aviation Forecast Component
- NAMCE, Naval Aviation Maintenance Center for Excellence
- MWSS 473 Detachment Alpha, Marine Corps Reserve Motor transportation company

=== Educational institutes ===
- Akers Elementary School (Preschool–8th)
- Neutra Elementary School (K–5)
- Columbia College
- West Hills College

== See also ==
- List of United States Navy airfields
