= VFA-122 =

Strike Fighter Squadron 122
- Country: United States
- Branch: United States Navy
- Type: Fighter/Attack
- Role: Introduce the Super Hornet to the fleet, train replacement personnel to fly and maintain the aircraft
- Size: 80+ aircraft
- Part of: Strike Fighter Wing, Pacific
- Garrison/HQ: NAS Lemoore
- Nickname: "Flying Eagles"
- Motto: "We Train the Experts"
- Colors: Blue and Gold
- Mascot: Eagle

Commanders
- Commanding Officer: CAPT Kristen “Dragon” Findlay
- Executive Officer: CDR Clifton “Marv” Helterbran
- Command Master Chief: CMDCM Conrad Hunt

Aircraft flown
- Fighter: F/A-18E/F Super Hornet

Strike Fighter Squadron 122 (VFA-122), also known as the "Flying Eagles", are a United States Navy F/A-18E/F Super Hornet Fleet Replacement Squadron stationed at Naval Air Station Lemoore. The squadron's radio callsign is Clutch.

== History ==
There have been two distinct Navy squadrons known as the "Flying Eagles". The first was established in 1950 as VC-35, later redesignated VA(AW)-35, and then VA-122 and was disestablished in May 1991. Often, the new squadron will assume the nickname, insignia, and traditions of the earlier squadrons, but officially, the US Navy does not recognize a direct lineage with decommissioned squadrons if a new squadron is formed with the same designation.

In January 1999 a new Flying Eagles squadron was established as Strike Fighter Squadron 122 (VFA-122), the first squadron to operate the F/A-18E/F Super Hornet.

On 1 October 2010 VFA-125 (the "legacy" F/A-18 Hornet FRS also stationed at NAS Lemoore) was deactivated and the squadron's aircraft and personnel were absorbed into VFA-122. The merger was intended to cut administrative costs and streamline production in anticipation of the "legacy" F/A-18 Hornet being phased out by the Super Hornet and F-35 Lightning II in the coming years. The merged squadron retained the Flying Eagles insignia and the Rough Raiders of VFA-125 were deactivated until 2016 when they were reactivated as an F-35C FRS.

== Mission ==
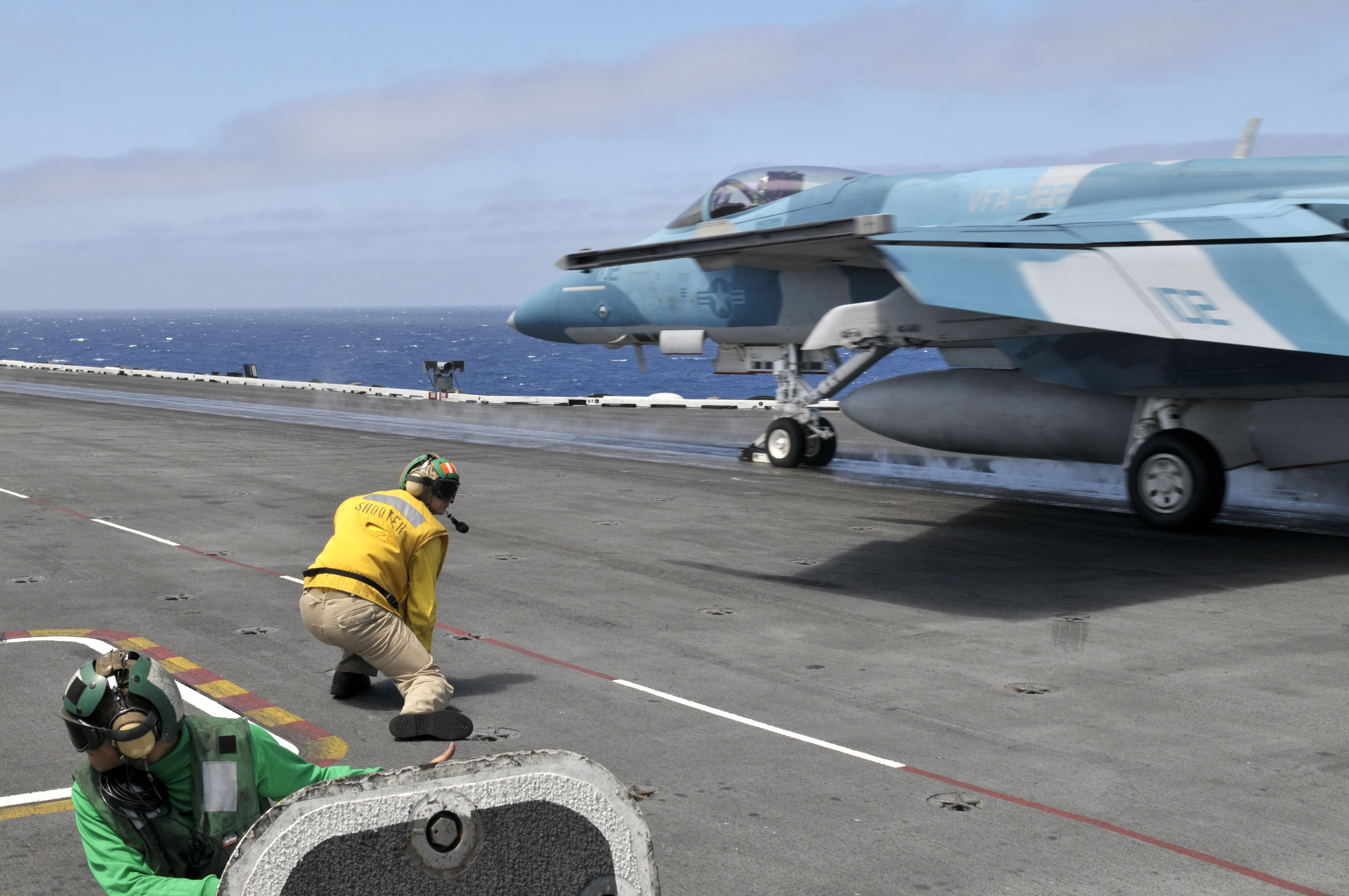
VFA-122 Carrier flight qualifications aboard USS Abraham Lincoln, August 2011

As the West Coast Hornet and Super Hornet Fleet Replacement Squadron, the squadron's mission is to train Navy and Marine Corps F/A-18A/B/C/D/E/F Replacement Pilots and Weapon Systems Officers (WSOs) to support fleet commitments. Every 6 weeks a class of between 8–12 newly winged Navy pilots and Naval Flight Officers begins the 9-month training course in which they learn the basics of air-to-air and air-to-ground missions, culminating in day/night carrier qualification and subsequent assignment to fleet Hornet squadrons.

VFA-122's East Coast counterpart is VFA-106 at NAS Oceana. Aircrew returning from non-flying assignments undergo refresher training at VFA-122 prior to returning to the fleet. Additionally, VFA-122 (with the help from the Center of Naval Aviation Technical Training Unit: CNATTTU) trains maintenance personnel and provides replacement aircraft to fleet units.

VFA-122 currently has approximately 225 officers, 408 enlisted personnel and operates over 60 aircraft. The squadron often detaches aircraft to Naval Air Station Fallon, Nevada and Naval Air Facility El Centro, California, as well as various aircraft carriers for carrier qualifications (CQ).

== Significant mishaps ==
On 6 April 2011, squadron pilot Matthew I. Lowe, 33, and weapons systems officer Nathan H. Williams, 26, were killed when their F/A-18 crashed half a mile from NAS Lemoore on a routine training mission.

== Trivia ==
In 2011, in honor of the Centennial of Naval Aviation, the F/A18F Super Hornet BuNo 165677 was painted in a unique "digital camo" look.

== See also ==
- Naval aviation
- Modern US Navy carrier air operations
- United States Marine Corps Aviation
- List of United States Navy aircraft squadrons
- List of Inactive United States Navy aircraft squadrons
