= VFA-192 =

Strike Fighter Squadron 192
- Active: 26 March 1945 - present
- Country: United States
- Branch: United States Navy
- Type: Fighter/Attack
- Role: Close air support Air interdiction Aerial reconnaissance
- Part of: Carrier Air Wing Two
- Garrison/HQ: NAS Lemoore
- Nickname: "Golden Dragons"
- Mottos: "Be Ready, our Enemy Must Lose", B.B.S.O.B. (Big Balled Sons Of Bitches) and S.S.H.W.F.G.D ("Super Shit Hot World Famous Golden Dragons")
- Engagements: World War II; Korean War; Vietnam War; Operation Earnest Will; Gulf War; Operation Southern Watch; 1996 Taiwan Strait Crisis; Operation Enduring Freedom; Iraq War; Operation Prosperity Guardian; Operation Poseidon Archer

Commanders
- Commanding Officer: CDR Ian Kemp
- Executive Officer: CDR Ben Rothenburg
- Command Master Chief: CMDCM Michelle Coronado

Aircraft flown
- Attack: FJ-4B Fury; A-4 Skyhawk; A-7 Corsair II
- Fighter: F6F Hellcat; F8F Bearcat; F4U Corsair; F9F Panther; F9F Cougar; F/A-18A/C/C(N) Hornet; F/A-18E Super Hornet

Strike Fighter Squadron 192 (VFA-192), also known as the "World Famous Golden Dragons", are a United States Navy F/A-18E Super Hornet fighter squadron stationed at NAS Lemoore. Their radio callsign is Jury.

== Squadron insignia and nickname ==
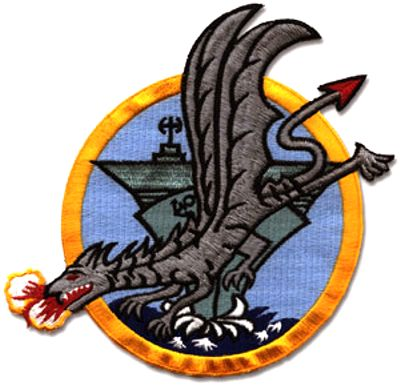
Early squadron insignia.

The squadron's first insignia was approved by the Chief of Naval Operations (CNO) on 11 October 1945 and consisted of a reddish-brown kangaroo with crimson boxing gloves on a white cloud. The squadron was known as the Fightin' Kangaroos.

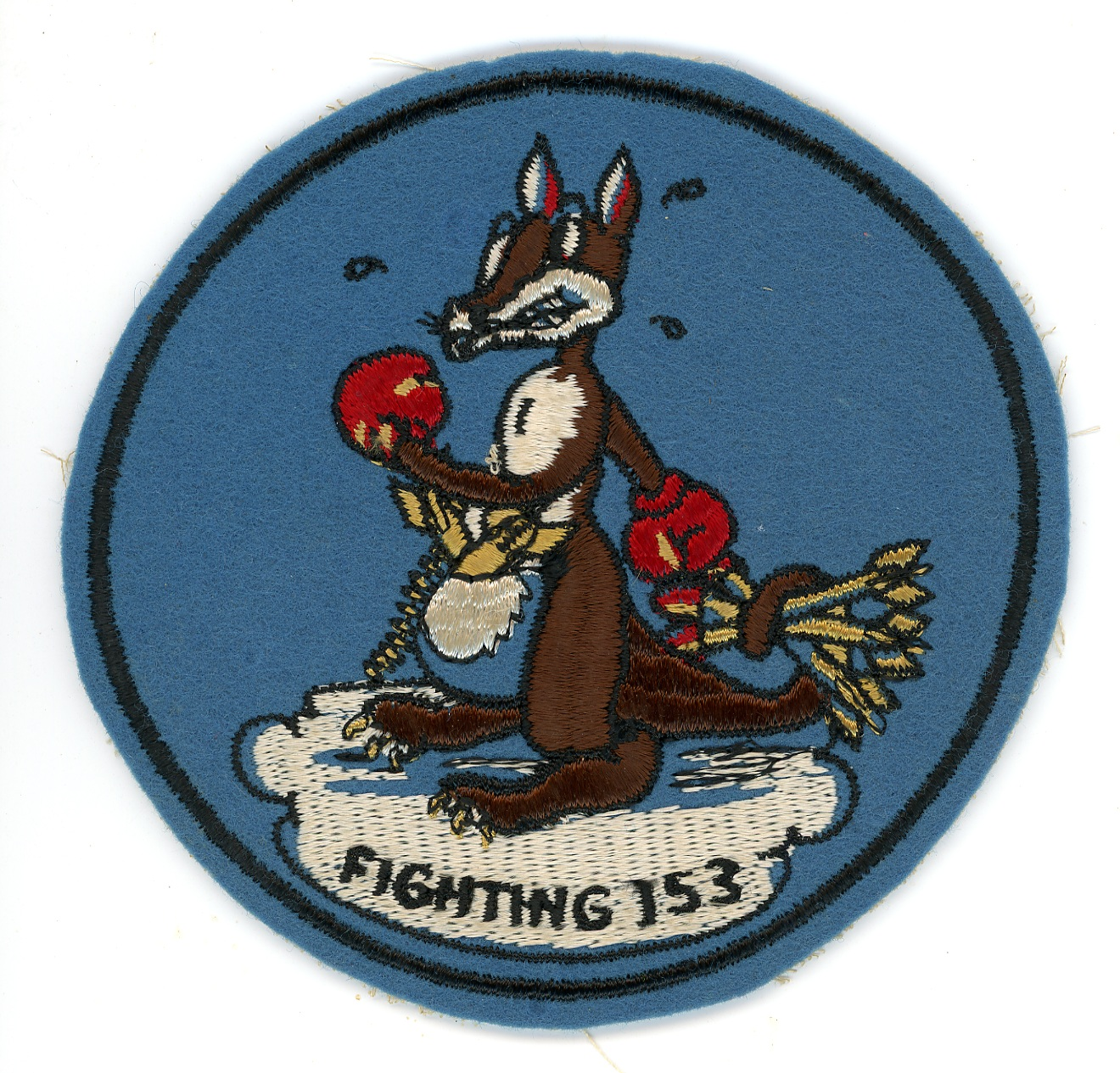
VF-153 Fightin Kangaroos

Following the squadron's redesignation to VF-15A, the squadron changed its name to the Black Knights and a new insignia was approved on 24 November 1947. It was a black helmet with gold markings and a gold shield. When the squadron was redesignated VF-151, the helmet/shield insignia was modified and the Latin inscription In Omnia Paratus was added, meaning ready for anything.

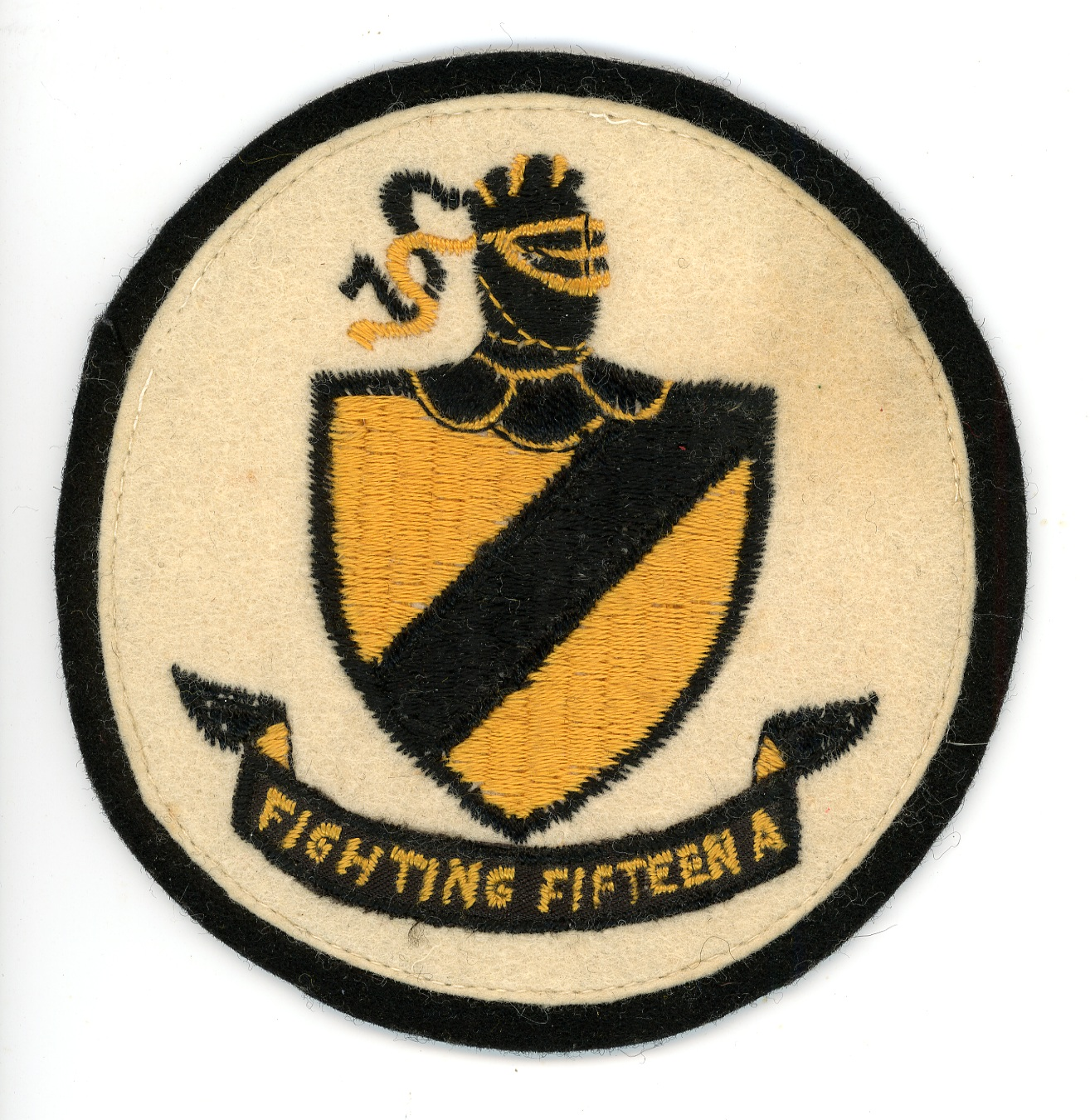
VF-15A

A new squadron insignia was approved on 8 August 1950, consisting of a silver dragon and grey/black aircraft carrier. This design was modified with a yellow dragon, white nuclear symbol and white cloud with a red rising center when the squadron became VA-192 on 21 June 1956. The squadron took on the nickname Golden Dragons at this time.

== History ==
=== 1940s ===
Fighter Squadron 153 (VF-153) was originally established on 26 March 1945 at NAS Atlantic City flying the F6F-3 Hellcat. The squadron received F6F-5s in April and relocated to NAAS Oceana in June. The squadron moved to NAS Alameda in August 1946, and was redesignated to Fighter Squadron 15A on 15 November 1946.

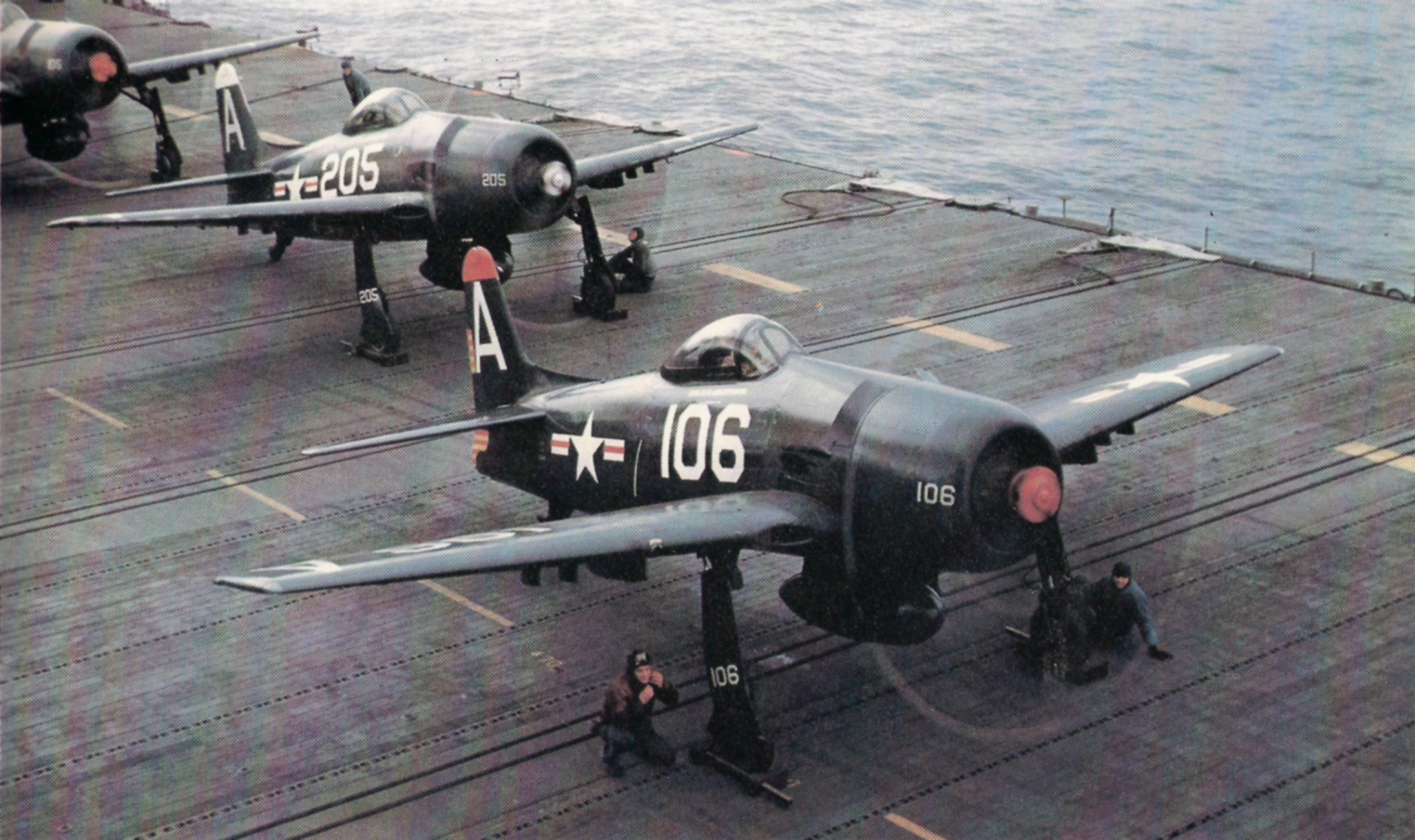
VF-15A F8F-1s aboard USS Tarawa in 1948

The squadron's first deployment was aboard USS Antietam from March–October 1947. Immediately following their return, the squadron transitioned to the F8F-1 Bearcat in November 1947.

The squadron was redesignated Fighter Squadron 151 (VF-151) on 15 July 1948. In February 1949, half of the squadron's personnel and aircraft deployed aboard USS Boxer for a Pacific Fleet Minor Cold Weather Exercise near Kodiak, Alaska. They upgraded to the F8F-2 model of the Bearcat in July 1949.

=== 1950s ===
In January 1950, the squadron sailed from Alameda aboard USS Boxer. It was redesignated Fighter Squadron 192 (VF-192) on 15 February, and returned from the Western Pacific in June. Immediately upon return, VF-192 transitioned to the F4U-4 Corsair.

The squadron deployed aboard USS Princeton from November 1950 to June 1951 in support of the Korean War. On 5 December 1950, the squadron flew its first combat missions, providing close air support for U.S. Marines during the Battle of Chosin Reservoir in North Korea. On 1 May 1951, the squadron participated in a special strike in the Hwacheon Dam Korean War raid with VF-193 and VA-195. The purpose of the mission was to destroy the flood gates and raise the level of the river to form a natural barrier against the enemy's advance. VF-192 F4U-4s were tasked with flak and small arms suppression. After deployment, the squadron moved to NAS Moffett Field and began to transition to the jet-powered F9F-2 Panther, receiving several of these aircraft in July 1951. However, all of these aircraft were transferred to VF-191 in October 1951, and VF-192 continued to fly the F4U-4.

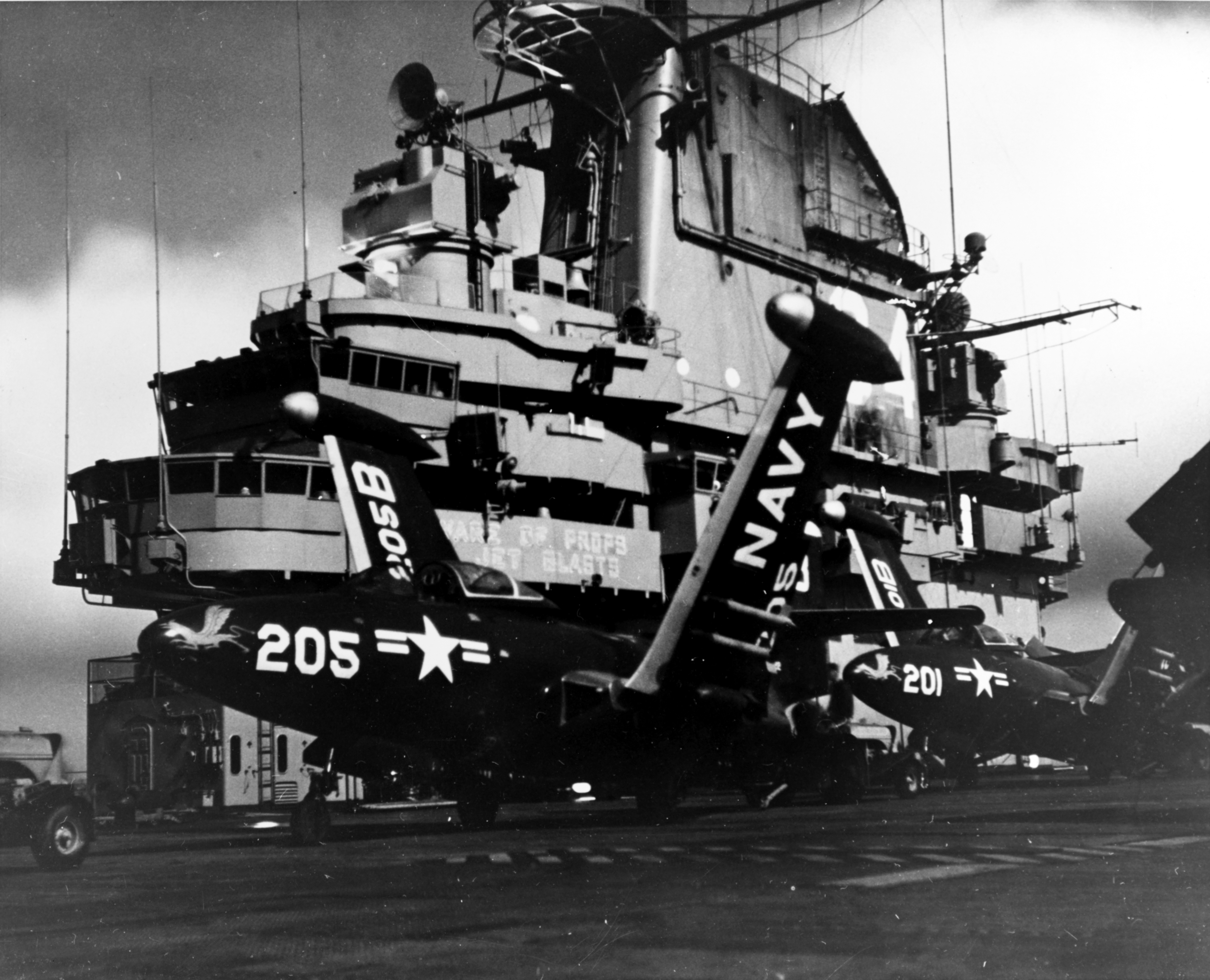
F9F-5 Panthers from VF-192 aboard the USS Oriskany in 1954.

The squadron deployed for Korea aboard USS Princeton again from March–November 1952. On 23–24 June, the squadron, along with units from two other carrier air groups, conducted coordinated air strikes against North Korean hydroelectric plants. In one of the major joint Navy, Air Force and Marine Corps air strikes of the war, VF-192's Corsairs struck the Suiho hydroelectric plant on the Yalu River, and the Kyosen and the Fusen hydroelectric plants. In July, VF-192 participated in another joint strike, hitting industrial targets in North Korea's capital city of Pyongyang.

Early in 1953, the squadron entered the jet age by receiving the F9F-2/5 Panther fresh off the assembly line.

The squadron deployed aboard USS Oriskany in September 1953, and during that cruise to the Orient, the pilots participated in the filming of The Bridges at Toko-Ri. It was the debut of this film that earned the squadron the name "World Famous Golden Dragons."

On 19 January 1956, the squadron upgraded to the swept-wing F9F-6 Cougar and their mission changed to include the aircraft's ground weapons delivery capability. On 15 March 1956, the official designation of the squadron was changed from Fighter Squadron to Attack Squadron 192 (VA-192). The squadron received its first F9F-8s in June 1956.

VA-192, now known as the Golden Dragons, transitioned to the FJ-4B Fury in December 1957, and following an exchange of aircraft, maintainers and support equipment with VA-216, transitioned again to the A4D-2 Skyhawk in July 1959.

=== 1960s ===
In December 1962, the squadron moved from Moffett Field to NAS Lemoore, California, and on 21 November 1964, after completing almost ten months in the Western Pacific, the squadron returned from their fourth consecutive cruise aboard USS Bon Homme Richard. After a four-month turnaround, they deployed aboard the USS Bon Homme Richard in April 1965 for a ten-month cruise in support of the Vietnam War. The new and more powerful A-4E Skyhawk with the ability to carry a greater bomb load, was received in June 1966.

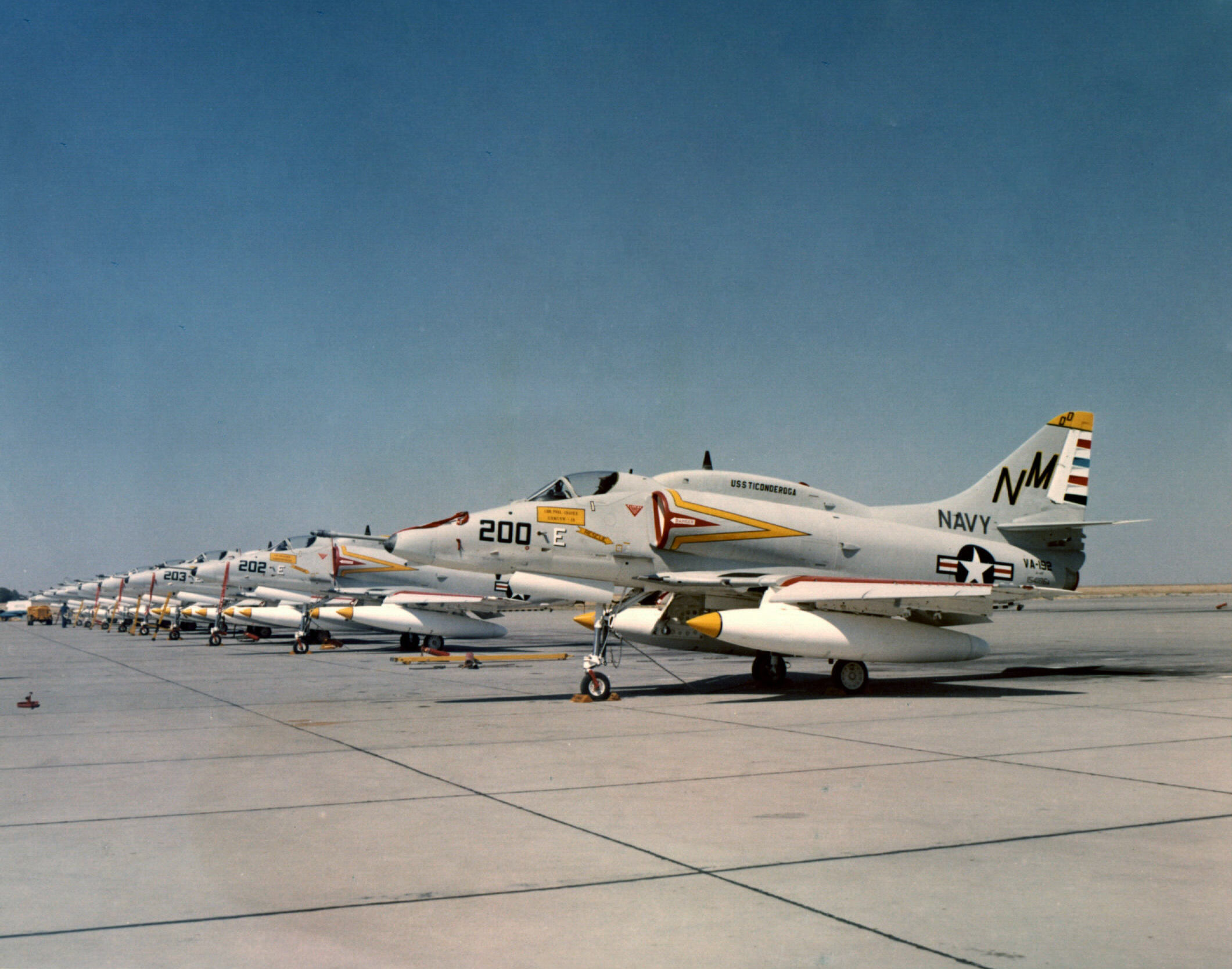
VA-192 A-4Fs in 1967

The squadron deployed again to Yankee Station in October 1966 aboard USS Ticonderoga. During this deployment, squadron pilot LCDR Michael J. Estocin distinguished himself posthumously earning the Medal of Honor for his gallantry and courage while flying two separate missile suppression missions to Haiphong. On the second mission, Commander Estocin's A-4 was shot down and he was listed as MIA; on 10 November 1977 his MIA status was changed to presumed KIA. In his memory, the Navy's award for the best F/A-18 Hornet squadron is called the Michael J. Estocin Award.

In July 1967, VA-192 became the first operational fleet squadron to receive the new A-4F Skyhawk, and in December of that year they again deployed aboard USS Ticonderoga. In March 1968, VA-192, along with other squadrons in CVW-19, conducted flight operations from USS Ticonderoga in the Sea of Japan as part of Operation Formation Star - a continuing show of American forces in the area following the capture of USS Pueblo (AGER-2) by North Korea.

In April 1969, the squadron made their last deployment with the A-4F aboard USS Oriskany. During this cruise the squadron was recognized for its safety record over 55 accident-free months, 30,477 flight hours and 11,580 carrier landings. No other carrier jet squadron had ever achieved such a safety record up to that time.

=== 1970s ===
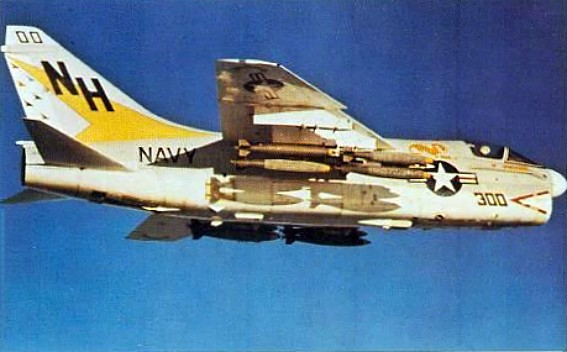
VA-192 A-7E "CAG-bird" over Vietnam, 1971. This A-7 was destroyed on 2 November 1972

VA-192 took delivery of their first A-7E Corsair II in February 1970. On 6 November 1970, the squadron deployed aboard USS Kitty Hawk. During this cruise, VA-192's "Laotian Highway Patrol" set an all-time record for ordnance dropped on a single cruise, over 15 million pounds, while flying more than 6,600 flight hours and amassing 2,901 arrested landings. The squadron delivered this record amount of ordnance on enemy supply routes both day and night, in all kinds of weather, without losing a single man or aircraft. After returning to NAS Lemoore in July 1971, the squadron immediately began preparing for another combat cruise to Southeast Asia. On 17 February 1972, VA-192 departed on their sixth Vietnam combat cruise, flying their first combat sorties on 5 March 1972. In May 1972, squadron aircraft participated in the mining of North Vietnamese harbours and Operation Linebacker, concentrated air strikes against targets in North Vietnam. The squadron flew over 3,600 combat strikes while participating in seven combat line periods over a record 192 days.

From late 1973 to 1978, the squadron made several WestPac deployments aboard the USS Kitty Hawk. In November 1973, VA-192 deployed with CVW-11 and Kitty Hawk as part of the first CV concept air wing deployment on the West Coast. This concept employed all aspects of carrier aviation warfare into one air wing deployed on a single deck. On 3 March 1979 the squadron embarked aboard USS America at Norfolk, Virginia, for their first Mediterranean cruise.

=== 1980s ===
The squadron deployed for a second Mediterranean cruise aboard USS America on from April to November 1981, spending 202 of 220 days at sea. In November 1982, the squadron joined Carrier Air Wing 9 and became a part of the USS Ranger team.

From July to August 1983, USS Ranger, with VA-192 embarked, was ordered to operate off the coast of Nicaragua in response to an unstable situation in Central America. From October 1983 to January 1984, USS Ranger, with VA-192 embarked, was extended on station in the Arabian Sea due to the Iranian threat to block oil exports from the Persian Gulf.

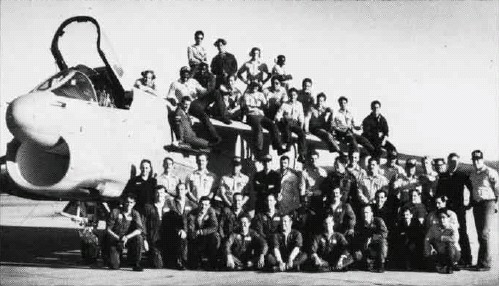
VA-192 personnel at Cold Lake, Canada, in 1982

By early 1985, the squadron began to prepare for transition to the F/A-18A Hornet. About half of the A-7E's and personnel who maintained them had been transferred from the squadron when the squadron was ordered to MCAS Iwakuni, Japan under the Marine Corps Unit Deployment Program. In less than three months, the squadron was fully manned and equipped with 12 A-7E's, and on 3 June 1985 launched for a three-day transpacific flight to Iwakuni. Upon arrival, the squadron became part of Marine Aircraft Group 12 under the 1st Marine Air Wing.

The squadron returned to NAS Lemoore for Christmas and on 10 January 1986 VA-192 was re-designated Strike Fighter Squadron One Nine Two (VFA-192) and began F/A-18 Hornet transition training under VFA-125. The squadron received their first F/A-18A on 5 May 1986. This new beginning also included notification that the squadron would be changing homeport to join CVW-5 and USS Midway out of Yokosuka, Japan. This change became official on 1 July 1986, and in November VFA-192 executed their second trans-Pacific movement in eighteen months in new F/A-18A Hornets to NAF Atsugi, Japan.

1987 began with VFA-192's first deployment embarked on USS Midway as a member of the restructured CVW-5. The next twelve months included 261 days of embarked operations in the South China Sea, Indian Ocean, and Arabian Sea. During November and December, the squadron participated in Operation Earnest Will, providing air cover for the escort of reflagged Kuwait oil tankers in the Strait of Hormuz and Persian Gulf.

=== 1990s ===
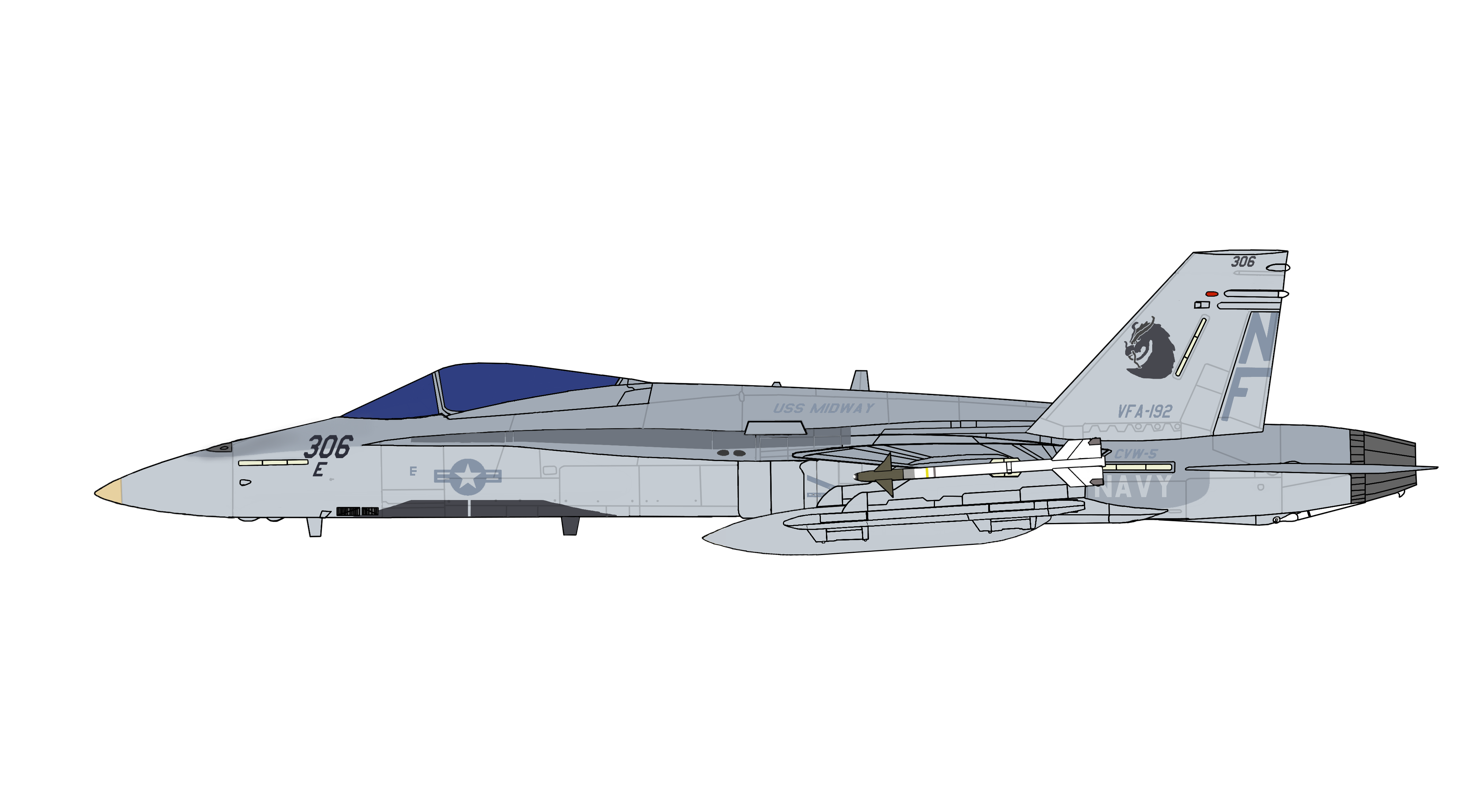
NF-306, an F/A-18A VFA-192 in the January 1991.

On 2 October 1990, the squadron set sail aboard USS Midway for the Persian Gulf in support of Operation Desert Shield. When Operation Desert Storm began on the night of 17 January 1991, the squadron attacked Iraqi missile batteries. Over the next 43 days, the Golden Dragons flew 576 combat sorties, dropping over 730,000 pounds of ordnance. In March, VFA-192 and the Midway Battle Group departed the Persian Gulf, returning home to Yokosuka following seven months of deployment.

On 21 August 1991, VFA-192 and CVW-5 embarked for the last time aboard USS Midway prior to her retirement and replacement as the forward deployed carrier by USS Independence. During the turnover at Pearl Harbor, Hawaii, the squadron also traded their F/A-18A aircraft for newer F/A-18Cs.

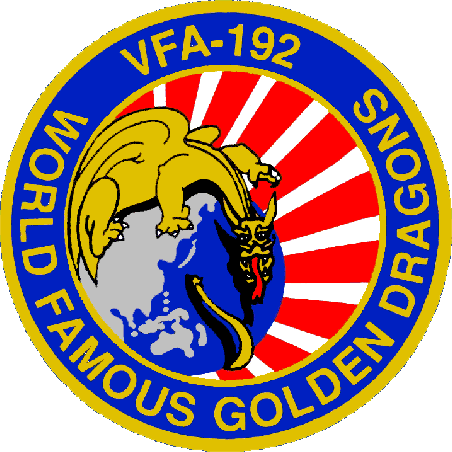
VFA-192 Atsugi Rising Sun Patch

On 15 April 1992, the squadron made their first combat deployment aboard the Independence, participating in the 50th anniversary celebration of the Battle of Coral Sea in Sydney, Australia. They were also a part of the battle group that began and spearheaded Operation Southern Watch (OSW), establishing the Iraqi no-fly zone south of the 32nd parallel north. In late 1993, mid 1995, and again in late 1998, the squadron deployed to the Persian Gulf in support of OSW. In 1996, as part of CVW-5, they were deployed as part of the 1996 Taiwan Strait Crisis.

On 7 July 1998, the squadron and CVW-5 embarked for the last time aboard USS Independence. In Hawaii, the squadron moved to USS Kitty Hawk and upgraded aircraft to Lot 17 F/A-18C Night Attack Hornets. The squadron deployed again on 2 March 1999 for the South Pacific and to the Persian Gulf in support of OSW.

=== 2000s ===
After the September 11 attacks, the squadron began preparations for an emergency deployment and began training at Iwo Jima while USS Kitty Hawk sortied from Yokosuka. Within a week the squadron was again carrier qualified and ready to sail. Instead, CVW-5 was divided to fill urgent requirements elsewhere in support of Operation Enduring Freedom.

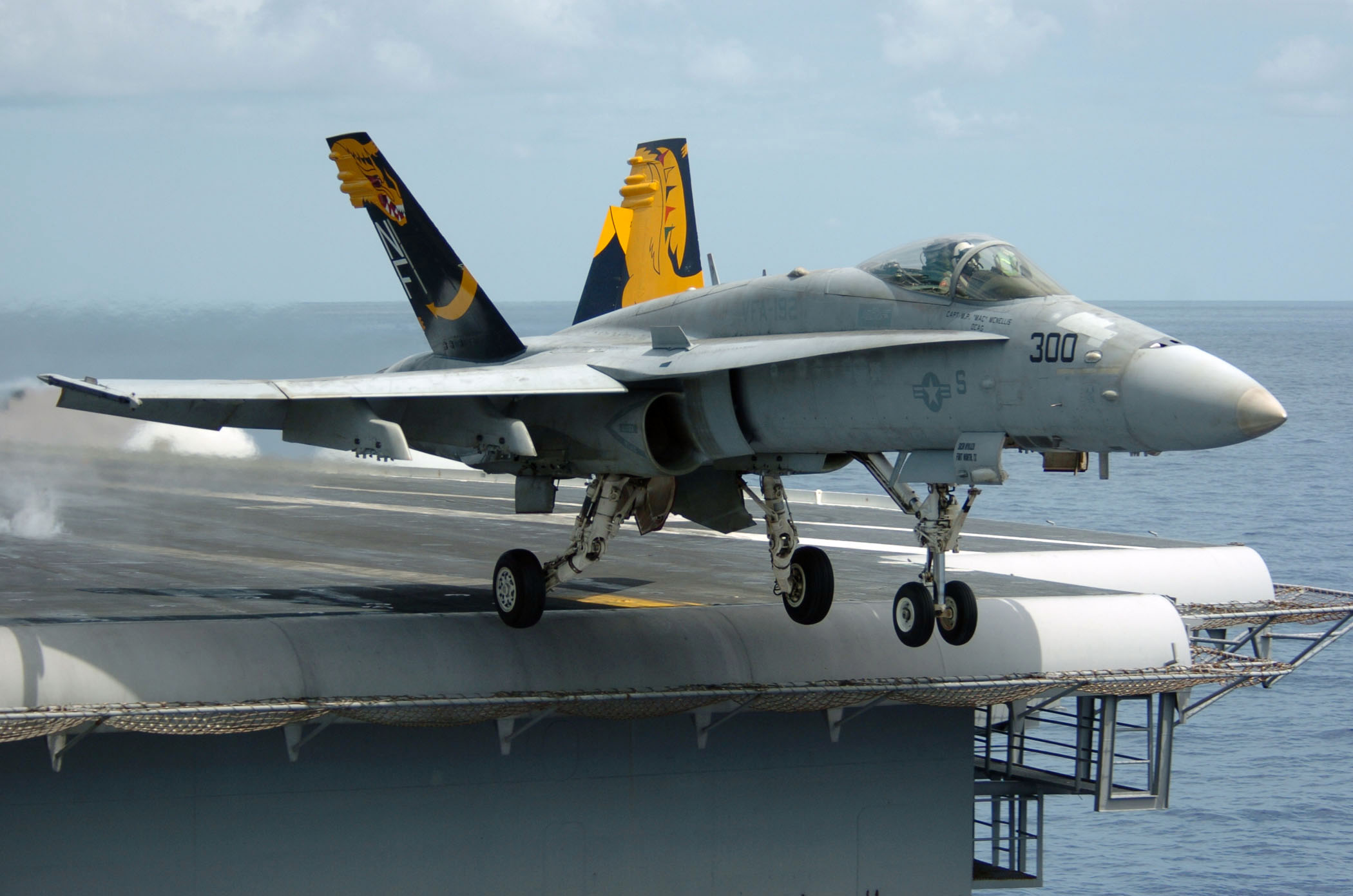
An VFA-192 F/A-18C (N) Hornet in 2005.

CVW-5 Detachment A, comprised F/A-18Cs from VFA-192 and VFA-195, S-3Bs from VS-21 and HH-60's from HS-14, sailed aboard USS Kitty Hawk to the Indian Ocean with a large Special Operations contingent embarked. The Special Operations force moved from USS Kitty Hawk into Afghanistan while the aircraft provided close air support (CAS) until November 2001. Detachment B, comprised F/A-18Cs from VFA-27 and manned with pilots from all three CVW-5 Hornet squadrons, deployed to the U.S. Navy Support Facility Diego Garcia to provide air defense of the Maritime Pre-positioned Fleet and USAF bomber force deployed there.

In January 2003, VFA-192 deployed aboard USS Kitty Hawk to the Persian Gulf in support of Operation Iraqi Freedom. The squadron flew 339 combat missions and dropped 224,000 pounds of ordnance including 283 JDAM and LGB bombs. After 100 consecutive days at sea, the squadron returned to Japan in May 2003.

On 15 December 2009, VFA-192 departed NAF Atsugi and CVW-5 as part of a homeport change to NAS Lemoore and CVW-9. Likewise, VFA-115 arrived in NAF Atsugi on 13 December 2009 to be the replacement squadron for VFA-192. Upon arrival at NAS Lemoore, VFA-192 joined CVW-9.

=== 2010s ===
VFA-192 Boeing F/A-18E Super Hornet launching from USS Carl Vinson in 2023

In March 2014, VFA-192 transitioned to F/A-18E Super Hornet and was assigned to CVW-2.

=== 2020s ===
In mid November 2024, VFA-192 and their F/A-18Es departed the US as part of CVW-2 on a scheduled deployment aboard the USS Carl Vinson

Following multiple exercises with Pacific Rim militaries, VFA-192 and CVW-2 were ordered to operate in the Red Sea in defense of international shipping lanes and Israel against Houthi/Iran proxy military unit attacks from Yemen.

VFA-192 and CVW-2 arrived in the CENTCOM AOR in early April 2025 with extensive combat operations against the Houthis/Iranians commencing upon arrival to the region.

== Awards ==
From 1966 to 1969, the squadron received four consecutive CNO Safety Awards. They are six time recipients of the Commander, Naval Air Force Pacific Fleet Battle Efficiency Award, most recently for 2009. They have twice been awarded the Michael J. Estocin award for being the top Strike Fighter Squadron in the Navy. In 1979, the Golden Dragons were awarded the Bruce Carrier Award for excellence in aviation maintenance. The Golden Dragons earned the Commander, Naval Air Force Pacific Safety-S award consecutively for 1999 and 2000, 2005 and 2006, and in 2011.

== See also ==
- List of United States Navy aircraft squadrons
- Naval aviation
- Modern US Navy carrier air operations
- List of Inactive United States Navy aircraft squadrons
