= Michael J. Estocin =

United States Navy Medal of Honor recipient (1931–1967)

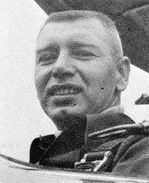
- U.S. Navy photograph of then–Lt Cmdr Michael J. Estocin, taken during the Oct 1966 – May 1967 Western Pacific cruise of the USS Ticonderoga
- Born: April 27, 1931; Turtle Creek, Pennsylvania, US
- Died: presumably April 26, 1967 (aged 35); Presumed near Haiphong, North Vietnam
- Burial place: remains never recovered; memorial marker placed at Fort Rosecrans National Cemetery, San Diego, California
- Military career
- Allegiance: United States of America
- Branch: United States Navy
- Service years: 1954–1967
- Rank: Captain (posthumous)
- Unit: Attack Squadron 192
- Conflicts: Vietnam War (MIA)
- Awards: Medal of Honor; Distinguished Flying Cross; Purple Heart (2); Air Medal (12)

Michael John Estocin (April 27, 1931 – April 26, 1967 (presumed)) was a United States Navy officer and a recipient of the United States military's highest decoration—the Medal of Honor—for his actions in the Vietnam War.

== Biography ==
Estocin was born on April 27, 1931, in Turtle Creek, Pennsylvania,. He graduated from Slippery Rock State Teachers College in 1954.

== Military career ==
Estocin entered the Naval Aviation Cadet program on June 11, 1954, and was commissioned in September 1955.

=== Vietnam War ===
By April 20, 1967, Estocin had reached the rank of lieutenant commander and was an A-4 Skyhawk pilot in Attack Squadron 192, operating off of the USS Ticonderoga in the Gulf of Tonkin. On that day, he supported a bombing mission over Haiphong, North Vietnam.

=== April 26 mission ===
Six days later, on April 26, he supported another strike aimed at Haiphong's thermal power station, with John B. Nichols acting as his escort in an F-8 Crusader. Estocin and Nichols flew ahead of the main attack and were charged with suppressing any surface-to-air missiles (SAMs) in the area. The strike on the power plant went without incident, and the two pilots were about to head back to the Ticonderoga when Estocin detected an active SAM site. A single missile was launched from the site and exploded near his A-4, knocking it into a barrel roll. Estocin was able to regain control and pulled the aircraft, burning at the belly and wing roots, into a 30 degree dive.

Estocin's wingman, John Nichols, immediately called for a helicopter rescue. He flew beside the stricken plane, getting close enough to see Estocin in the cockpit with his head bent forward slightly, not moving. He tried to contact Estocin by radio but received no response. As the A-4 lost altitude and entered a cloud bank, Nichols continued to follow it, even as a second SAM exploded nearby. After reaching 600 feet (180 m), he leveled off and watched as Estocin's plane fired its remaining Shrike missiles and impacted with the ground. He circled the area, looking for a parachute, but saw nothing. Nichols called off the rescue mission and returned to the Ticonderoga.

Although Nichols was certain Estocin had been killed in the crash, intelligence from Hanoi indicated that he had ejected and been captured. The U.S. military declared him a prisoner of war, causing Nichols to feel deep guilt for having called off the rescue mission. When the prisoners were released in 1973 and Estocin was not among them, it was presumed that he had died in captivity.

In 1993, a committee investigating the cases of missing U.S. military personnel concluded that Estocin was never captured and had indeed died in the crash of his plane. Estocin's disappearance and presumed death occurred one day before his 36th birthday. A marker in his memory was placed in Fort Rosecrans National Cemetery, San Diego, California.

== Awards and honors ==
For his actions during the missions over Haiphong on April 20, and April 26, 1967, Estocin was promoted to captain in absentia and awarded the Medal of Honor. In 1976, his parents ran him as a write-in candidate for President of the United States to bring attention to prisoner of war/missing in action issues. The U.S. Navy named the guided missile frigate USS Estocin (FFG-15), launched in 1979, in his honor.

Naval Aviator Badge
Medal of Honor
Distinguished Flying Cross	Purple Heart w/ 5/16" Gold Star	Air Medal w/ Strike/Flight Numeral 12
Navy and Marine Corps Commendation Medal w/ Combat "V"	Combat Action Ribbon	Navy Presidential Unit Citation
Navy Unit Commendation	National Defense Service Medal w/ 3/16" bronze star	Armed Forces Expeditionary Medal
Vietnam Service Medal w/ three 3/16" bronze stars	Republic of Vietnam Gallantry Cross Unit Citation	Republic of Vietnam Campaign Medal

The Michael J. Estocin Award was created by the U.S. Navy to recognize meritorious achievement by a strike fighter squadron. The award, originally sponsored by the McDonnell Douglas corporation, is a trophy with a polished black stone base and an 18-inch (46 cm) stainless steel ribbon topped with a stylized model of a strike fighter aircraft. It is awarded annually to the strike fighter squadron with the greatest professional reputation, aggressiveness, and operational performance.

=== Medal of Honor citation ===
Captain Estocin's official Medal of Honor citation reads:

For conspicuous gallantry and intrepidity at the risk of his life above and beyond the call of duty on 20 and 26 April 1967 as a pilot in Attack Squadron 192, embarked in USS Ticonderoga (CVA-14). Leading a 3-plane group of aircraft in support of a coordinated strike against two thermal power plants in Haiphong, North Vietnam, on 20 April 1967, Capt. Estocin provided continuous warnings to the strike group leaders of the surface-to-air missile (SAM) threats, and personally neutralized 3 SAM sites. Although his aircraft was severely damaged by an exploding missile, he reentered the target area and relentlessly prosecuted a SHRIKE attack in the face of intense antiaircraft fire. With less than 5 minutes of fuel remaining he departed the target area and commenced in-flight refueling which continued for over 100 miles. Three miles aft of Ticonderoga, and without enough fuel for a second approach, he disengaged from the tanker and executed a precise approach to a fiery arrested landing. On 26 April 1967, in support of a coordinated strike against the vital fuel facilities in Haiphong, he led an attack on a threatening SAM site, during which his aircraft was seriously damaged by an exploding SAM; nevertheless, he regained control of his burning aircraft and courageously launched his SHRIKE missiles before departing the area. By his inspiring courage and unswerving devotion to duty in the face of grave personal danger, Captain Estocin upheld the highest traditions of the U.S. Naval Service.

== See also ==
- List of Medal of Honor recipients for the Vietnam War § E
- List of people who disappeared mysteriously: 1910–1990
