= VFA-154 =

Strike Fighter Squadron 154
- Active: 1 July 1946 – present
- Country: United States
- Branch: United States Navy
- Type: Fighter/Attack
- Role: Close air support Air interdiction Aerial reconnaissance
- Part of: Carrier Air Wing Eleven
- Garrison/HQ: NAS Lemoore
- Nickname: "Black Knights"
- Motto: BKR! ("Black Knights Rule!")
- Mascot: Black Knight
- Engagements: Korean War; Vietnam War; Operation Earnest Will; Gulf War; Operation Southern Watch; 1996 Taiwan Strait Crisis; Operation Enduring Freedom; Iraq War; Operation Prosperity Guardian; Operation Poseidon Archer

Commanders
- Commanding Officer: CDR Jason Harrel
- Executive Officer: CDR John Puckett
- Command Master Chief: CMDCM Jesus Felix

Aircraft flown
- Fighter: F6F Hellcat; F4U Corsair; F9F-2 Panther; FJ-3 Fury; F-8 Crusader; F-4 Phantom II; F-14 Tomcat; F/A-18F Super Hornet

Strike Fighter Squadron 154 (VFA-154), also known as the "Black Knights", is a United States Navy strike fighter squadron stationed at Naval Air Station Lemoore. The Black Knights are an operational fleet squadron flying the F/A-18F Super Hornet. They are currently attached to Carrier Air Wing Eleven and deployed aboard the aircraft carrier USS Theodore Roosevelt. Their tailcode is NH and their callsign is "Knight".

== History ==
=== Late 1940s to the 1980s ===
VFB-718 was established on 1 July 1946 as a Naval Reserve squadron at NAS New York in New York flying the F6F Hellcat. Soon they transitioned to the F4U Corsair. The unit went through several designation changes, becoming VF-68A then VF-837.

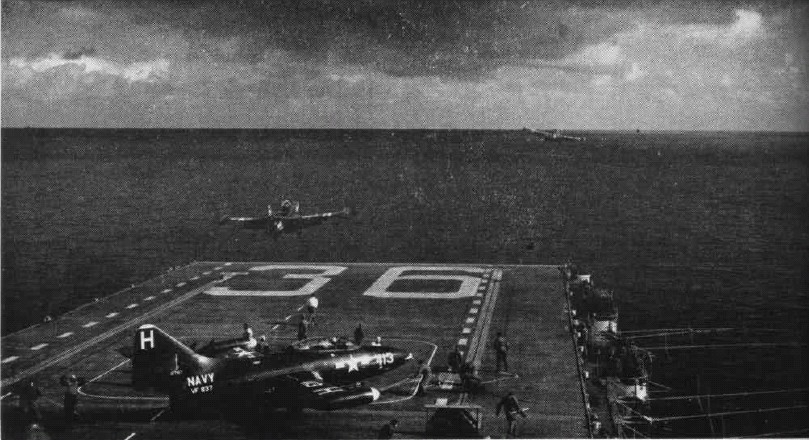
VF-837 F9F-2B fighters are launched from USS Antietam off Korea.

When the unit was called VF-837 the squadron moved to NAS Moffett Field in California. VF-837 flew a combat cruise in the Korean War of USS Antietam. By this time they were flying the F9F-2 Panther.

VF-837 returned from their first cruise and started working up for a second cruise. On 4 February 1953 while passing under the Golden Gate Bridge on board USS Princeton and on their way back to Korea, VF-837 was redesignated VF-154. VF-154 dropped 470 tons of bombs and expended 1,500,000 rounds of ammunition in Korea and on 15 June 1953 VF-154 flew 48 sorties on a single day, setting a record for a Navy squadron. By now the squadron had transitioned to the F9F-5 Panther. During this period until late 1957, the VF-154 insignia was a flaming black panther on a yellow background. In the late 1950s VF-154 flew the FJ-3 Fury.

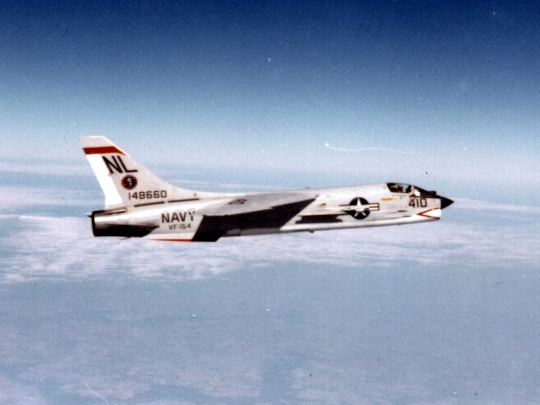
VF-154 F-8D Crusader in the early 1960s

In 1957 VF-154 transitioned to the Navy's first operational supersonic carrier aircraft, the F-8 Crusader. The combination of supersonic aircraft and modified World War II small deck, "27-Charley" carriers such as USS Hancock – VF-154's assigned carrier – was not easy on aircraft or pilots – VF-154 lost a full squadron of aircraft (14) and 20% of its pilots in the process.

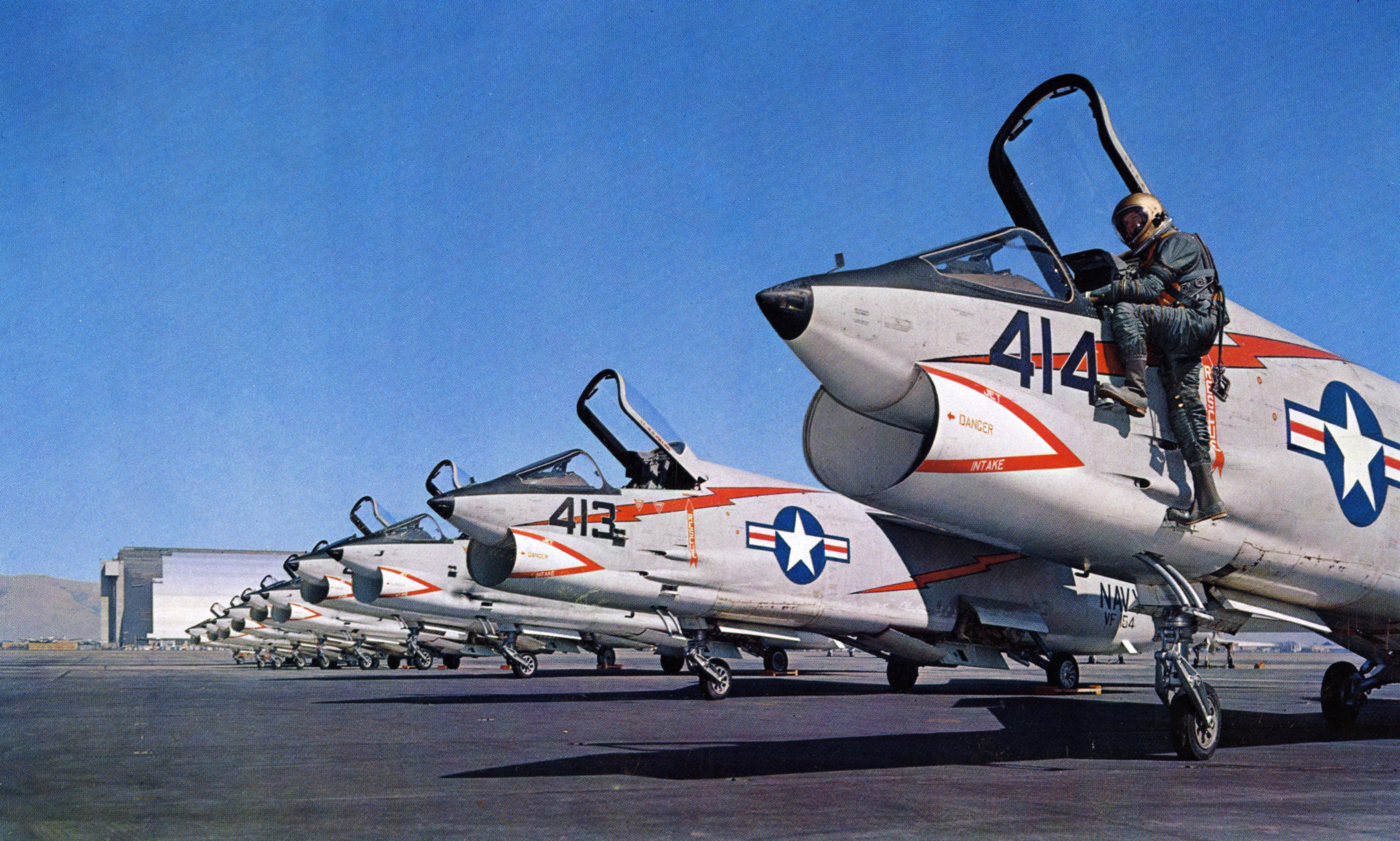
VF-154 F-8 Crusaders on the flight line at Moffett Field, circa 1958. Pilot is wearing an early full pressure suit.

In recognition of the new era and aircraft, VF-154 changed its insignia. Because of the new 1,000 mph fighters, the squadron was designated "The Grand Slammers" and a new insignia was designed by squadron pilot, John "Crash" Miottel with the final version drawn by the famous cartoonist Milton Caniff, creator of the Terry and the Pirates and Steve Canyon. The new insignia was a silver Crusader knight on a black field with 2 F-8 divisions (4 plane formations) crossing in the background. Because of the patch design, and the arrival of new Crusaders configured for night operations, the squadron unofficially became known as the "Black Knights." Their official radio call sign was "City Desk", but virtually every squadron had a local, unofficial (and usually derogatory) call sign, bestowed by the rest of the squadrons at their home base. As a derogatory play on "City Desk", VF-154's unofficial call sign was "City Dump", so all of the squadrons at home base, including the Admiral's staff, referred to them as 'The Dumpers'. The Black Knights designation was added to the insignia and the name and insignia remain as VF-154 symbols to this day.

In 1965 the squadron deployed as part of Carrier Air Wing 15 on board USS Coral Sea to the Vietnam War. Their first combat strikes occurred on 7 February and their combat cruise lasted until November the same year. After that yearly combat cruises followed and VF-154 soon transitioned to the F-4 Phantom II and became part of Carrier Air Wing 2, where it remained until 1980. After a second cruise with USS Coral Sea, the squadron shifted carrier to USS Ranger and completing five more cruises to South East Asia.

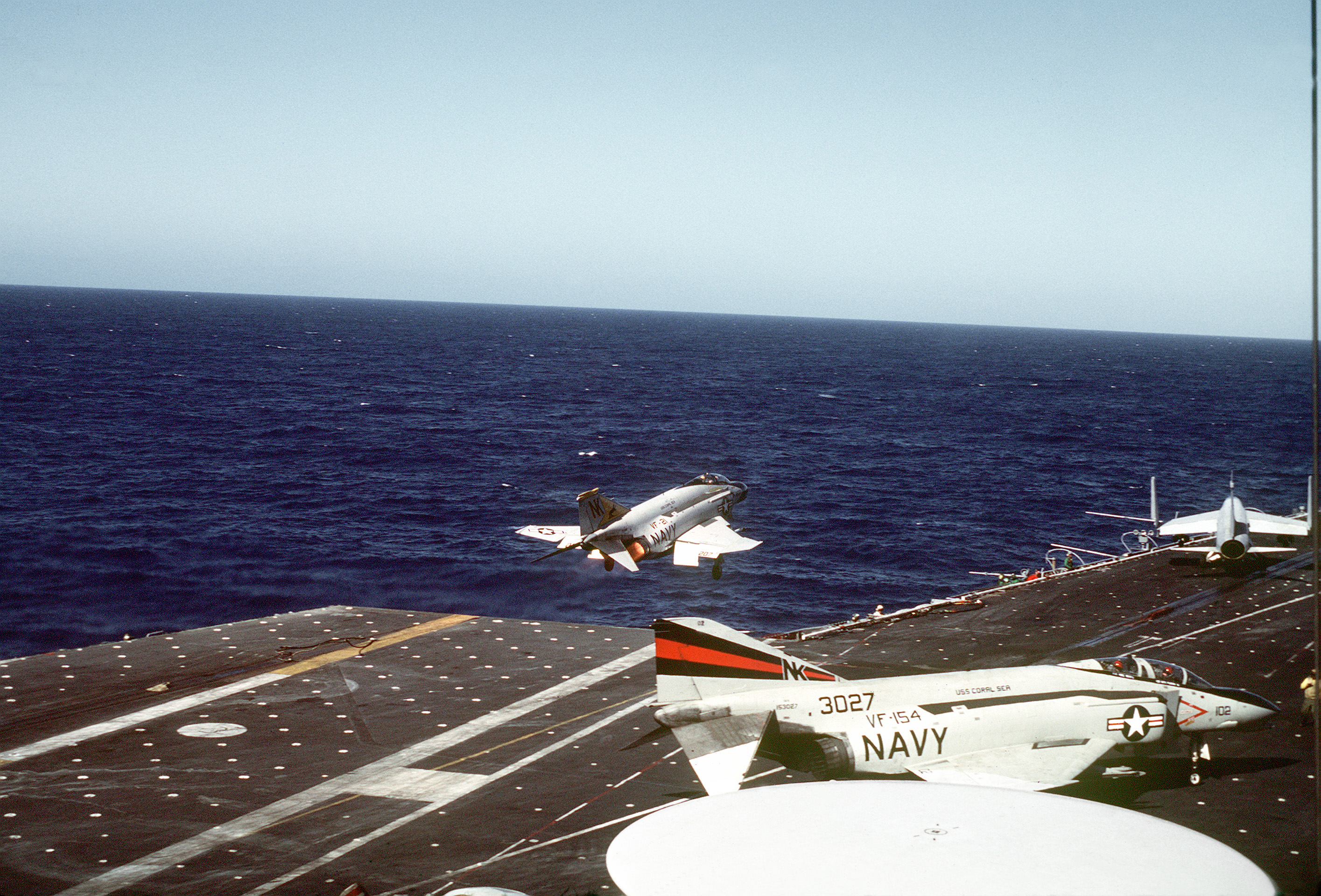
VF-154 F-4N Phantom II (right) aboard USS Coral Sea

During 1968–69, 1969–70 and 1970–71 WestPac cruises aboard USS Ranger, VF-154 was equipped with the F-4J Phantom II which used the Westinghouse AWG-10 RADAR system. Beginning with their 16 November 1972 deployment on board USS Ranger, VF-154 participated in some of the last US Navy strikes of the war, they undertook the squadrons final Vietnam cruise, and they were awarded the Clifton Award – recognizing them as the best fighter squadron in the United States Navy.

In 1979 the unit transitioned to the F-4S, the last Navy version of the aircraft, but returned to the F-4N in January 1981. Several cruises with USS Coral Sea followed, as the carrier did not have strong enough decks to carry the F-14A Tomcat. During this time VF-154 spent 120 days at sea of the coast of Iran during the Iranian hostage crisis until the hostages were formally released into United States custody. Thus VF-154, and sister squadron VF-21, were among the last units to convert to the F-14A. VF-154 finally transitioned to the F-14A in October 1983. Due to their late equipment, the squadron received TARPS capable F-14s from the start. The first cruise with the F-14 was in 1985 on board USS Constellation as part of Carrier Air Wing 14. Several further cruises on board USS Constellation followed, with one taking place in 1987, during this cruise they operated in the Persian Gulf, intercepting Iranian P-3s, providing air cover for reflagged tankers transiting the Strait of Hormuz during Operation Earnest Will, and conducting movements in the Gulf of Oman, at the so-called "Gonzo" station.

=== 1990s ===
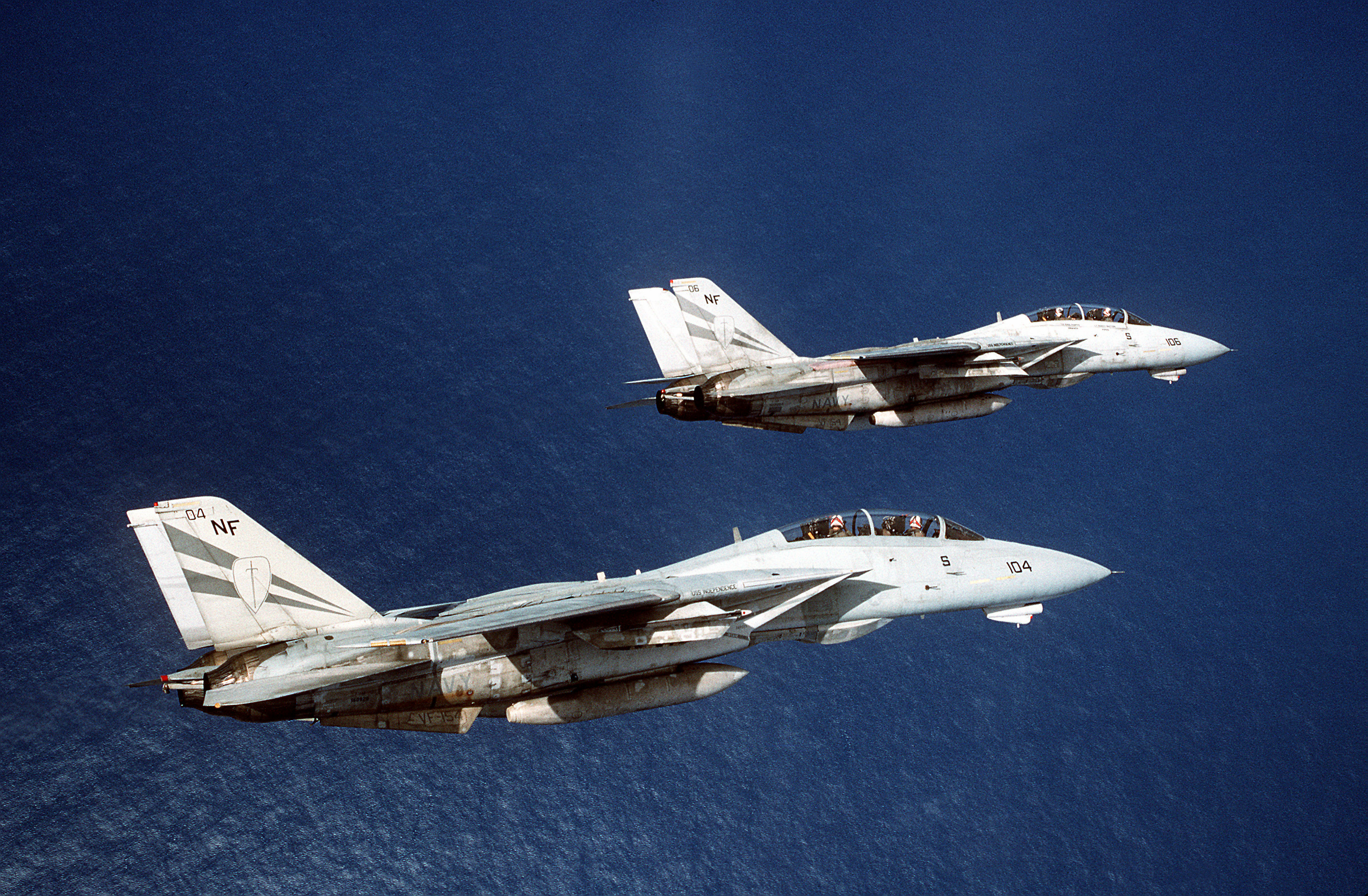
VF-154 F-14A Tomcats perform a section roll off Saipan in the Mariana Islands

After the cruises with USS Constellation, CVW-14 moved to USS Independence. Aboard Independence, VF-154 and VF-21 became the first F-14 squadrons to arrive in the Persian Gulf as part of Operation Desert Shield, although they never took part in Operation Desert Storm as USS Independence returned to the US before the war started.

In August 1991, USS Independence become home based at Yokosuka, Japan, to replace USS Midway. VF-154 stayed with the carrier for this, but moved from CVW-14 to Carrier Air Wing 5 and from NAS Miramar to NAF Atsugi, thus becoming the first forward deployed F-14 squadron. At the same time as joining CVW-5 VF-154 became the first F-14 squadron to deploy with an air-to-ground bombing capability. Along with USS Nimitz, USS Independence and her air wing were involved in operations to demonstrate US resolve in support of Taiwan. The 1995 Chinese military exercises once raised tension in the region and signalled China's opposition to Taiwan's Presidential Election.

With the cut back on F-14 squadrons, VF-154's sister squadron, VF-21, was disestablished, leaving them as the only F-14 squadron in CVW-5. It was at this time that VF-154 absorbed a large number of personnel and aircraft from VF-21. This increased the number of aircraft to 16 and VF-154 turned in to a "super squadron" due to size of personnel and number of aircraft. As well as keeping their TARPS role, VF-154 have become very active in the air-to-ground role. Regular deployments aboard USS Independence continued with carrier qualifications on board during November 1996.

The squadron arrived in Fremantle, Australia, on 11 April 1997, having just completed participation in the exercise 'Tandem Thrust'. With VF-154's F-14As severely showing their age the squadron swapped six of its worst airframes for six from VF-213, which had visited on board USS Kitty Hawk, a few weeks earlier. The squadron finally received LANTIRN upgrades to their F-14As in the last quarter of 1997 and January 1998. Although relatively late in the upgrade cycle, VF-154 was able to benefit – their F-14As being the first in the Fleet to receive the new AN/ALR-67 Radar Warning Receiver.

On 5 January 1998 CVW-5 was called to action due to trouble in the Persian Gulf. USS Independence arrived to the area on 4 February. VF-154 was leading the first CVW-5 flight package into southern Iraq within 24 hours. Although the tension eased the carrier and air wing remained on station until the end of May. Several missions were flown each day as part of Operation Southern Watch. With their new LANTIRN pods VF-154 were able to provide high quality video of potential targets day or night.

In July 1998 CVW-5 made their last cruise on board USS Independence. After a cross Pacific transit to Pearl Harbor the air wing cross decked to their new home – USS Kitty Hawk. During the transfer, USS Kitty Hawk picked up the "Don't Tread On Me" Jack – signifying her as the oldest ship on active service. Once again the shore period was short, on 30 August the air wing and carrier departed once more. Training began with a VF-154 organised MISSILEX – the F-14's shooting four AIM-54s and downing four targets. The cruise continued with Foal Eagle exercises in the seas around Korea. By the time the squadron returned to port during November they had spent 240 days at sea. The squadron gaining numerous awards, most notably the Pacific Fleet Battle 'E', Safety 'S' and 'Boola-Boola' missile awards and the Clifton award.

In January 1999 squadron aircraft deployed to Guam for SFARP training. A few weeks later they received their first Digital Flight Control System (DFCS) equipped jets. On the 2 March, VF-154 sailed on board USS Kitty Hawk for their first full WESTPAC deployment. During the four months of cruise the squadron took part in Tandem Thrust '99, an unexpected Persian Gulf period (due to USS Theodore Roosevelt being called to cover events in Kosovo), plus port visits to Hong Kong, Thailand and Singapore. The cruise also saw a new first – two Naval Aviators reaching 1,000 traps on the same day. Captain R. McHarg, Commander, Air Group of CVW-5 landed on board in a specially painted VF-154 F-14A. His pilot for the historic trap was Lieutenant D. Baxter. Later the same day the commanding officer of VFA-27, Commander K. Hutcheson, made his landing in an F/A-18. Both landings took place in the Persian Gulf, where USS Kitty Hawk and CVW-5 completed 5,426 sorties, including 1,356 combat missions over Southern Iraq.

=== 2000s ===
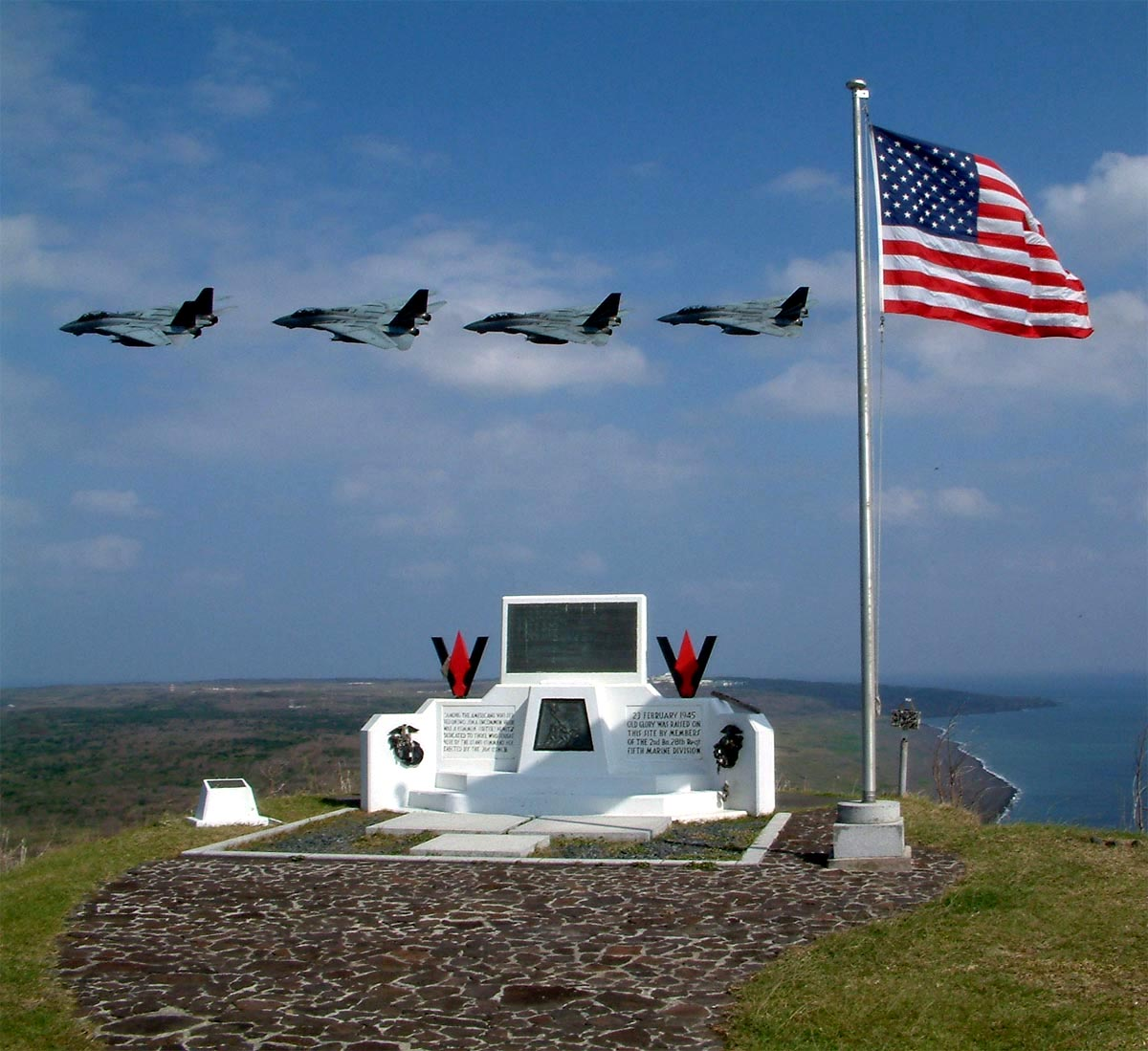
VF-154 F-14s fly past the memorial on top of Mount Suribachi in March 2003

Between 1999 and 2002, VF-154 participated in five deployments in the Pacific as well as the Indian Ocean. In 2001, CVW-5 flew more than 600 missions and 100 combat sorties in support of Operation Enduring Freedom.

In 2003, VF-154 made their last cruise with the F-14, this time in support of Operation Iraqi Freedom. This was the first time CVW-5 deployed to the Persian Gulf since 1999. USS Kitty Hawk arrived on station on 26 February and CVW-5 was chosen to be the dedicated Close Air Support wing. VF-154 deployed with 12 F-14As and detached five F-14As and five air crews to the Al Udeid Air Base in Qatar where these F-14s and its crews worked closely with Panavia Tornados of the Royal Air Force, as well as McDonnell Douglas F-15E Strike Eagles and General Dynamics F-16 Fighting Falcons of the United States Air Force, and McDonnell Douglas F/A-18 Hornets of the Royal Australian Air Force. The United States Central Command had contacted CVW-5 and specifically asked for the air wing to deploy Forward Air Controller capable Tomcats and crews to support coalition land-based aircraft as well as Special Forces squads operating inside Iraq. The F-14s were usually paired with the aircraft already deployed to the airbase, dropping bomb themselves or guiding bombs dropped by other aircraft. The aircrews flew daily missions and in one 48-hour period the VF-154 detachment flew 14 sorties totalling 100 hours of flight time. The crews at Al Udeid flew more than 300 combat hours and delivered 50 000 pounds of ordnance, (98 GBU-12s) during the 21-day stay at the airbase.

On 1 April 2003, VF-154 lost one of its aircraft over southern Iraq when it suffered an engine failure then a fuel transfer system failure which caused the remaining engine to run out of fuel. The crew, already two hours into the mission and having dropped some bombs, ejected and was soon picked up by an Sikorsky HH-60 Pave Hawk helicopter. This F-14A was the first coalition aircraft loss of Operation Iraqi Freedom.

The remaining F-14s on USS Kitty Hawk, piloted mostly by junior officers, expended 246 GBU-12s, ten GBU-16s and four GBU-10s during 27 days of combat. By the end of the war, VF-154 had dropped 358 laser-guided bombs, buddy-lased 65 more and passed target coordinates for 32 JDAMs in 286 sorties. The squadron had expended more ordnance than any other unit in CVW-5, despite flying the oldest jets in the air wing.

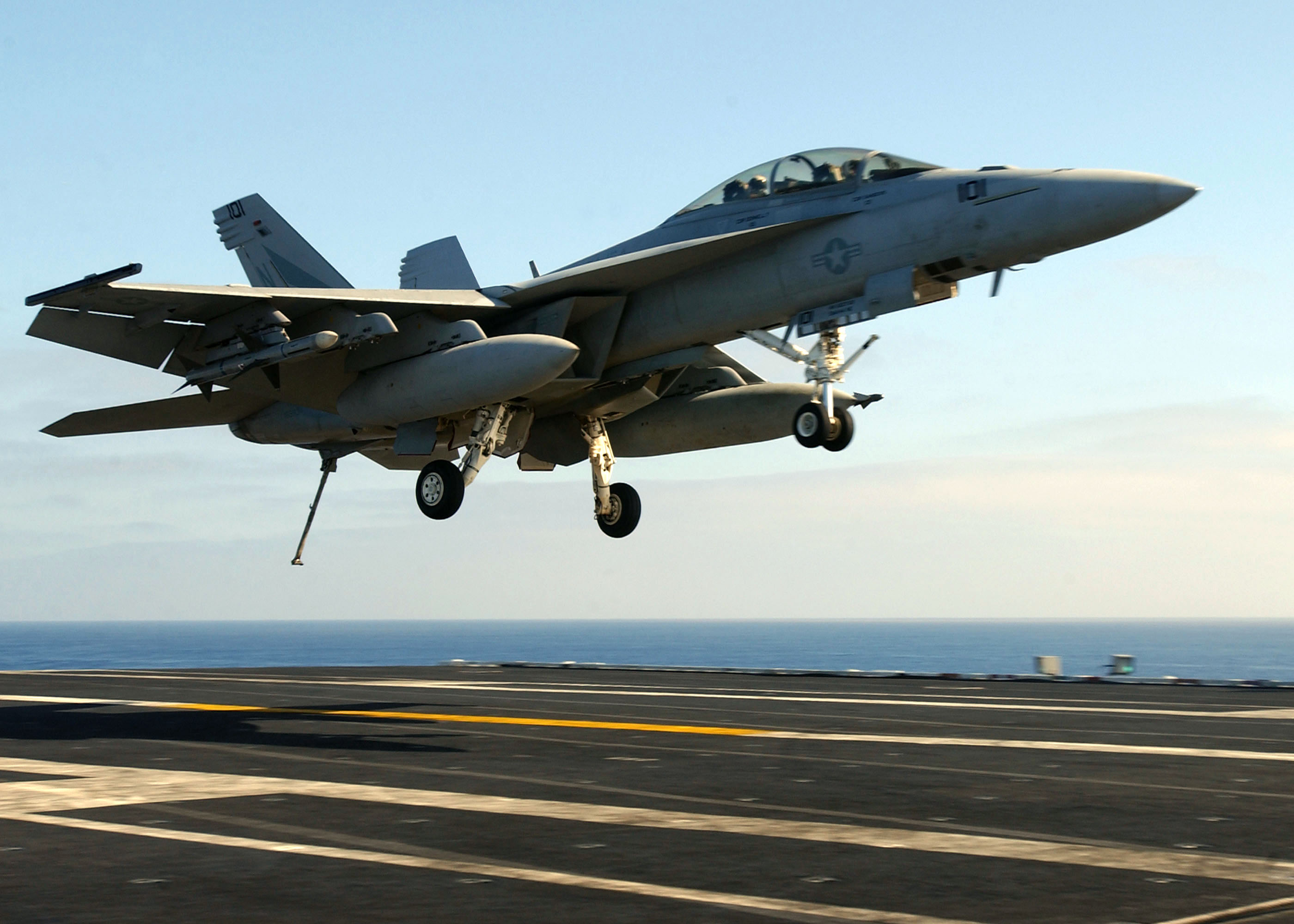
VFA-154 F/A-18F Super Hornet lands aboard USS John C. Stennis in 2006

In September 2003 VF-154 left NAF Atsugi for the last time and ended its 13 years in Japan and 20 years operating the Tomcat. A month later, VF-154 was redesignated VFA-154 at its new home at NAS Lemoore, California, and began transitioning to the Navy's newest strike fighter, the F/A-18F Super Hornet. The squadron completed its first Super Hornet cruise in the summer of 2005 aboard USS Carl Vinson, part of Carrier Air Wing 9 supporting Operation Iraqi Freedom. On 6 April 2005, VFA-154 and VFA-147 dropped two 500-pound laser-guided bombs on an enemy insurgent location east of Baghdad.

As USS Carl Vinson entered its overhaul cycle, CVW-9 and VFA-154 deployed to USS John C. Stennis. VFA-154 and CVW-9 embarked on a new deployment to the Persian Gulf in the spring of 2007, supporting Operation Iraqi Freedom, Operation Enduring Freedom and a joint-military exercise off Guam called Valiant Shield.

VFA-154 and CVW-9 deployed with USS John C. Stennis on a scheduled Western Pacific deployment on 13 January 2009. VFA-154 and CVW-9 returned to the United States on 6 July after participating in exercises with Japan Maritime Self Defense Force and annual exercises as Foal Eagle with the Republic of Korea and joint exercise Northern Edge 2009. In October 2009 VFA-154 transitioned to the new F/A-18F Block II Lot 30/31A AN/APG-79 AESA radar Rhino.

In 2010 the squadron re-located from Carrier Air Wing Nine to Carrier Air Wing Fourteen (CVW-14) aboard USS Ronald Reagan and departed on its 2011 deployment on 2 February. In March VFA-154 found itself in the familiar waters of Northern Japan supporting the tsunami relief efforts as part of Operation Tomodachi. The squadron flew reconnaissance flights identifying groups of survivors for rescue by the Reagan's helicopters. Early to mid 2011 saw the squadron in the Persian Gulf in support of Operation New Dawn and Operation Enduring Freedom in Iraq and Afghanistan, respectively; as well as counter-piracy efforts throughout the Indian Ocean. The cruise was the final for CVW-14, with the squadron transferring to CVW-11 aboard USS Nimitz in 2012. VFA-154 is currently assigned to Carrier Air Wing 11 aboard the USS Theodore Roosevelt.

== See also ==
- List of inactive United States Navy aircraft squadrons
- List of United States Navy aircraft squadrons
- Modern United States Navy carrier air operations
- Naval aviation
