= USS Theodore Roosevelt =

USS Theodore Roosevelt has been the name of more than one United States Navy ship, and may refer to:

- USS Theodore Roosevelt (ID-1478), troop transport in commission from 1918 to 1919
- USS Theodore Roosevelt (SSBN-600), ballistic missile submarine in commission from 1961 to 1982
- USS Theodore Roosevelt (CVN-71), aircraft carrier in commission since 1986

== See also ==
- USS Roosevelt
