= Carrier Air Wing Eleven =

US Navy unit

- Active: 27 October 1942 - Present
- Country: United States
- Branch: United States Navy
- Type: Carrier Air Wing
- Part of: Carrier Strike Group 9
- Garrison/HQ: NAS Lemoore; USS Theodore Roosevelt
- Tail Code: NH
- Engagements: World War II; Korean War; Vietnam War; Operation Desert Shield; Operation Desert Storm; Operation Southern Watch; Operation Restore Hope; Operation Desert Fox; Operation Enduring Freedom; Operation Iraqi Freedom; Operation Inherent Resolve; Operation Prosperity Guardian; Operation Poseidon Archer
- Decorations: Presidential Unit Citation (2); Navy Unit Commendation (2)

Commanders
- Commander: CAPT Adam Bean
- Command Master Chief: CMDCM. Cristopher Silva

Insignia
- Call sign: Barbwire

Carrier Air Wing Eleven (CVW-11) is a United States Navy aircraft carrier air wing based at Naval Air Station Lemoore, California. The air wing is attached to the aircraft carrier USS Theodore Roosevelt.

== Mission ==
To conduct carrier air warfare operations and assist in the planning, control, coordination and integration of seven air wing squadrons in support of carrier air warfare including; Interception and destruction of enemy aircraft and missiles in all-weather conditions to establish and maintain local air superiority. All-weather offensive air-to-surface attacks, Detection, localization, and destruction of enemy ships and submarines to establish and maintain local sea control. Aerial photographic, sighting, and electronic intelligence for naval and joint operations. Airborne early warning service to fleet forces and shore warning nets. Airborne electronic countermeasures. In-flight refueling operations to extend the range and the endurance of air wing aircraft and Search and rescue operations.

== Subordinate units ==
CVW-11 consists of nine squadrons.

Code	Insignia	Squadron	Nickname	Assigned Aircraft
VFA-25		Strike Fighter Squadron 25	Fist of the Fleet	F/A-18E Super Hornet
VFA-86		Strike Fighter Squadron 86	Sidewinders	F-35C Lightning II
VFA-211		Strike Fighter Squadron 211	Fighting Checkmates	F/A-18E Super Hornet
VFA-154		Strike Fighter Squadron 154	Black Knights	F/A-18F Super Hornet
VAQ-137		Electronic Attack Squadron 137	Rooks	EA-18G Growler
VAW-115		Carrier Airborne Early Warning Squadron 115	Liberty Bells	E-2D Advanced Hawkeye
VRM-30		Fleet Logistics Multi-Missions Squadron 30, Detachment 3	Titans	CMV-22B Osprey
HSC-8		Helicopter Sea Combat Squadron 8	Eightballers	MH-60S Seahawk
HSM-75		Helicopter Maritime Strike Squadron 75	Wolf Pack	MH-60R Seahawk

== History ==
=== World War II ===
Carrier Air Wing Eleven (CVW-11) was previously designated Carrier Air Group Eleven (CVG-11) and (CVAG-11).

On 10 October 1942 at Naval Air Station San Diego, four squadrons joined to form Carrier Air Group Eleven (CVG-11). Bombing Squadron Eleven (VB-11), Fighting Squadron Eleven (VF-11), Scouting Squadron Eleven (VS-11) and Torpedo Squadron Eleven (VT-11). In late October the entire air group was sent to Hawaii. VB-11, VS-11 and VT-11 were stationed at NAS Barbers Point on Oahu and VF-11 was sent to NAS Maui. While at Maui, the pilots of VF-11 trained and enjoyed the hospitality of the von Tempsky ranch. Boyd, Maria and Alexa von Tempsky made sure VF-11 had a place to relax when they were not flying.

In February 1943 the Air Group embarked on USS Altamaha and USS Long Island en route to Nandi in the Fijian Islands. CVG-11 continued to train and fly simulated combat missions. By the time CVG-11 arrived in the Pacific combat zone only one aircraft carrier was operational. This meant the entire air group would be land based at Guadalcanal.

On 25 April 1943 CVG-11 arrived at Guadalcanal. VF-11 would fly from Lunga Point, known as "Fighter One." The pilots of VF-11 would set out on escort missions providing cover for the Bombing and Torpedo Squadrons. In addition, the "Sundowners" as VF-11 is known, searched for and destroyed Japanese aircraft operating in the region. It was during this time that VS-11 was re-designated to VB-21. The remainder of the air group (VB-11, VB-21 & VT-11) would fly from Henderson Field. The bomber and torpedo planes conducted patrol, search, spotting, strike, and night mine-laying operations.

On 8 June 1943 the Air Group suffered a great loss. The men of VT-11 were granted a leave to Australia. While leaving New Caledonia, one of the three transport planes crashed killing all 24 men on board. Included in the casualties were Air Group Commander Weldon L. Hamilton and 16 pilots and aircrew from VT-11.

On 16 June 1943 twenty eight pilots of VF-11 engaged an estimated 120 Japanese planes and shot down 31. On 1 August 1943 CVG-11 left Guadalcanal and boarded USS Chenango, USS St. Louis and USS Honolulu. They arrived back at NAS Alameda two weeks later. Upon return to the US, CVG-11 trained for their next assignment: carrier operations.

Three air groups flew into combat on board USS Hornet during World War II. Air Group Eleven replaced Air Group Two on 29 September 1944. While on board USS Hornet, CVG-11 attacked targets on Okinawa, Formosa, the Philippines, French Indo China and Hong Kong. The Air Group was tested daily by threat of kamikaze attacks against the ship, foul weather and intense anti-aircraft fire over the intended targets. The pilots of VF-11 were most proud of the fact that no VB-11 or VT-11 aircraft were lost to enemy fighter planes. Their top ace was Charles R. Stimpson with 16 victories. By the end of January 1945 the pilots and aircrews of Air Group Eleven claimed the following: 105 enemy planes shot down, 272 planes destroyed on the ground, over 100,000 tons of enemy shipping sunk, and over 100 Japanese ships damaged. These great accomplishments did not come without a price. In four months of flying. CVG-11 lost over 50 aircraft and had more than 60 men killed, missing-in-action or wounded. Air Group Eleven was replaced by Air Group Seventeen on 1 February 1945. They arrived back in Alameda on 24 February 1945. For these operations, CVG-11 was awarded the Presidential Unit Citation.

An exhibit honoring Carrier Air Group Eleven (CVG-11) is on board the USS Hornet Museum in Alameda, California. Its grand opening to the public was on Veterans Day of 11 November 2014.

In 2014 filmmaker George Retelas released the documentary Eleven which described the operation of CVG-11 via interviews with eleven of its surviving World War II veterans.

After the war, the navy changed the designation scheme for its Carrier Air Groups designating Air Groups configured for the Essex-class carrier CVAGs, those configured for the larger Midway-class carrier CVBGs, those configured for the light carriers of the Independence and Saipan classes CVLGs and those configured for remaining World War II escort carriers CVEGs. CVG-11 became CVAG-11. On 1 September 1948 the designation scheme was again changed, and all CVAGs and CVBGs reverted to CVGs and CVEGs and CVLGs were disestablished. CVAG-11 became CVG-11 for the second time.

=== Korean War ===
During the Korean War, CVG-11 was the first Air Wing to shoot down MiGs, and was instrumental in keeping the Pusan Perimeter from collapsing during the early stages of the war, and participated in various other significant operations such as the Inchon Invasion, the Wonsan landing and the highly successful movement from the Chosin Reservoir.

=== Vietnam War and the 1970s ===
CVG-11 deployed on board USS Kitty Hawk with the Seventh Fleet in October 1963 commanded by CDR Warren H. O'Neil, USN. On 20 December 1963 the navy redesignated its Carrier Air Groups to Carrier Air Wings and CVG-11 became Carrier Air Wing Eleven (CVW-11). CVW-11 flew the first Offensive Missions against North Vietnam in the spring of 1964, also experiencing the first losses of U.S. Navy aircraft; LT Charles Klusman was later rescued in August 1964 and returned to San Diego in September. In 1965, CVW-11 attached squadrons received new aircraft, such as the RA-5C Vigilante, A-6 Intruder, F-8 Crusader and the E-2 Hawkeye. With these new additions, between December 1965 and May 1966, CVW-11 conducted air strikes against targets during the Vietnam War and delivered more ordnance than any other air wing in the navy. In November 1966, CVW-11 and USS Kitty Hawk were awarded the Navy Unit Commendation for their actions during their deployment to the region. CVW-11 deployed for a 1966 to 1967 cruise to Asia, which earned them another Navy Unit Commendation in August 1967. Kitty Hawk and CVW-11 became the first battle group to be awarded the Presidential Unit Citation for performance during the Vietnam War, the citation was approved during operations between December 1966 through June 1968.

CVW-11 set numerous records for the Vietnam War, including a 61-day line period, which was the longest for the war. Prior to the limited bombing announcement, CVW-11 bombed targets in North Vietnam, striking enemy power plants, rail yards and lines of transports and communications. CVW-11's sustained presence in the region was instrumental in the defense of Khe Sanh. CVW-11 broke all records for combat sorties flown and ordnance dropped during its sixth WESTPAC deployment during November 1970 and July 1971, although it was short lived as the air wing broke its own record during the following deployment in 1972 under command of CAPT Doug McCrimmon, as they were deployed due to the Communist offensive, where CVW-11 deployed 107 aircraft, the largest Air Wing ever under the new CV Air Wing concept, which included tactical aircraft and anti-submarine aircraft on the same carrier. The 1973–1974 deployment was highlighted by an air power demonstration for the Shah of Iran and the Chairman of the Joint Chiefs of Staff while deployed to the Indian Ocean.

During the 1975 deployment, CVW-11 and Kitty Hawk deployed for their first non-combat cruise in nine years, which followed with two more deployments in 1975 and 1977. The 1977 cruise was the first with the F-14 Tomcat, S-3 Viking, the A-6E version of the Intruder and the E-2C version of the Hawkeye. The air wing made one last deployment of the decade in 1979 with USS America.

=== 1980s ===
In 1982 the Air Wing deployed once more on board America before CVW-11 switched carriers once again and deployed four times with USS Enterprise between 1982 and 1990. With highlights such as the deployment to the Northern Pacific during FLEETEX '84, a three-carrier operation, and the 1986 cruise saw the Air Wing deploy to the Indian Ocean, where F-14s often intercepted Soviet and Indian aircraft. Due to operations against Libya in the spring of 1986, it was decided that the battle group would head for the Mediterranean Sea and the "Line of Death", where CVW-11 aircraft would fly patrols for two months, although encounters with Libyan jets were rare. The carrier group got to visit Naples and Toulon, and instead of returning through the Suez Canal which they had used to transit to the Mediterranean, USS Enterprise transited through the Strait of Gibraltar and cruised the southern cape of Africa before venturing across the Indian Ocean and the Pacific back home.

During the 1988 cruise, CVW-11 saw action in the Persian Gulf in support of Operation Praying Mantis, flying off USS Enterprise, conducted strikes against Iranian naval vessels and oil platforms. These attacks were carried out by A-6 Intruders of the Green Lizards, VA-95. CVW-11 repelled a Boghammer fast attack boat raid on the Mubarak Oil Platform and severely damaged the frigate Sabalan, While the Sahand was sunk and F-14s scared away a section of Iranian F-4 Phantoms. CVW-11 was awarded the Joint Meritorious Unit Award for its actions.

The Air Wing made its final deployment with Enterprise from September 1989 to March 1990, which included several exercises with Japanese Maritime Self-Defense Force, Republic of Korea Naval and Air Forces, USAF and USMC and the largest assemblage of US Naval air and sea power since World War II with three carrier groups, composed of Enterprise, Carl Vinson and Constellation. The Air Wing also supported Operation Classic Resolve in December 1989 near Manila Bay. The mission was to support US interests following the 1989 Philippine Coup d' état attempt. The cruise ended with USS Enterprise switching from the Pacific Fleet to the Atlantic Fleet.

=== 1990s ===
The 1990s followed with major changes to the air wing. The A-7Es were replaced by F/A-18 Hornets, and the SH-3 Sea Kings were replaced with SH-60s while the E-2Cs and the A-6Es received major upgrades. CVW-11's first deployment was USS Abraham Lincoln's maiden voyage, cruising around South America to its new home in California. The 1991 Gulf War accelerated CVW-11s training schedule and a deployment began in May 1991. En route to the Persian Gulf, CVW-11 participated in Operation Fiery Vigil, the evacuation from Subic Bay during the Mt Pinatubo eruptions in the Philippines.

The 1993 deployment saw VF-213 as the sole F-14 squadron as the air wing supported Operation Southern Watch and Operation Restore Hope. Another deployment followed on board Abraham Lincoln for the 1995 cruise, supporting OSW once again. CVW-11 switched to USS Kitty Hawk for a 1997 cruise, another OSW deployment and supporting United Nations Security Council Resolution 986, the Oil for Food program. After the 1997 cruise, CVW-11 switched to USS Carl Vinson and VF-213 transitioned to the F-14D Super Tomcat.

CVW-11 supported Operation Desert Fox during the 1998–1999 cruise. The air wing participated in strikes during the last day of the operation, VF-213 delivered four GBU-24s with 100% accuracy (first combat use of the F-14D), VFA-22 and VFA-94 F/A-18s scored direct hits with eight GBU-16, while EA-6Bs from VAQ-135 and F/A-18s from VFA-97 provided AGM-88 support during the strike.

During the following three months, CVW-11 supported Operation Southern Watch, conducting 15 strikes during this period. On 5 January 1999, two F-14Ds launched two AIM-54 Phoenix missiles against two Iraqi MiG-25s that violated the no-fly zone, as soon as the missiles were launched, the MiGs escaped home and the missiles failed to hit their targets, this was the first use of the missile in combat. On 25 January, three aircraft from VFA-22 and VFA-94 employed the JSOW against a surface-to-air-missile complex which had plagued Coalition aircraft for nine years since the Gulf War, a total of 17 were dropped during missions over Iraq. During the deployment, VFA-22, VFA-94, VFA-97 and VF-213 dropped a total of 41,000 pounds of ordnance on SAM sites and communication sites, and additionally F/A-18s and EA-6Bs fired 20 HARMs. The Air Wing returned home safely in May 1999.

=== 2000s ===
In 2001 another deployment followed, which was planned to support OSW, but soon after 11 September 2001, Carl Vinson and CVW-11 departed for the Indian Ocean and aircraft from the air wing as among the first to launch strikes against Taliban and Al-Qaeda forces in Afghanistan in support of Operation Enduring Freedom.

After returning home, CVW-11 was reassigned to Cruiser-Destroyer Group Five and USS Nimitz in January 2002. The Air Wing bid farewell to the F-14 Tomcat, as VF-213 changed air wings to Carrier Air Wing Eight. VFA-14 and VFA-41, who had been part of CVW-8, had transitioned to the F/A-18 Super Hornet and were attached to CVW-11, and VFA-22 was sent to CVW-9. CVW-11 made its first deployment with Nimitz in March 2003 supporting Operation Iraqi Freedom, as only the second air wing to deploy Super Hornets. Nimitz remained on-station until September before returning home in November 2003.

After its return, VFA-97 was replaced by VMFA-232 flying the F/A-18C Hornet, and VS-29 flying the S-3B Viking was decommissioned. CVW-11 was among the first air wings deploying as the new "all-Hornet" air wing of the future, which included a flight deck certification of USS Ronald Reagan, during her maiden voyage from Norfolk, Virginia, to San Diego, California. In May 2005, CVW-11 deployed on board Nimitz supporting OIF and OEF and multinational exercises with Japan, Egypt and India until November 2005. This deployment was depicted in the documentary film Carrier.

In 2007 CVW-11 deployed on board USS Nimitz for a WESTPAC cruise and participated in Operation Valiant Shield, a joint-force exercise in the vicinity of Guam.

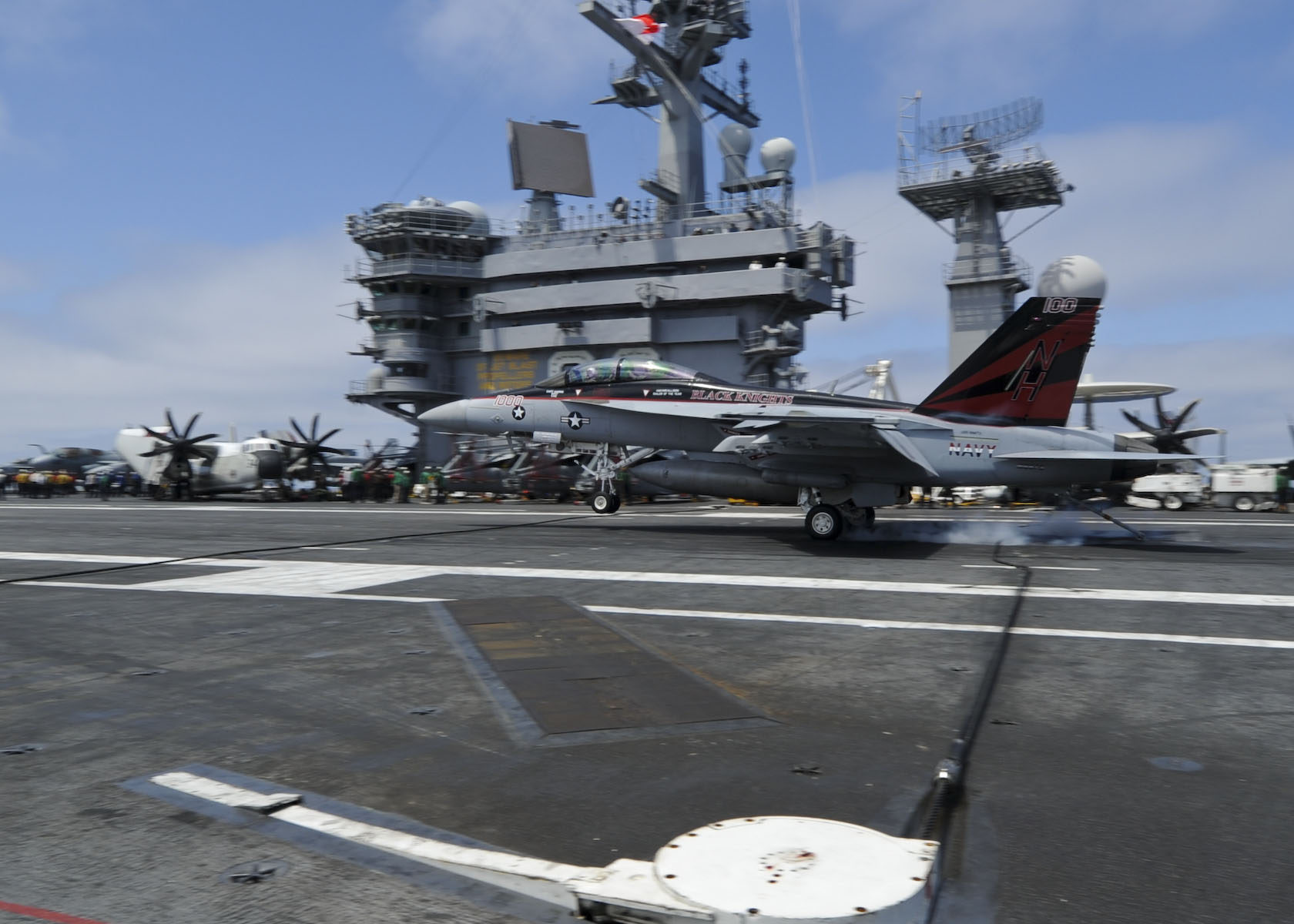
1000th arrested landing (11 June 2012)

On 18 January 2008, it was announced that CVW-11 would deploy on 24 January to the Pacific for a surge-deployment on board Nimitz. On 11 February, during their 2008 WESTPAC cruise, a Russian Tu-95 bomber was intercepted by four F/A-18s as it flew 2,000 feet (610 m) over USS Nimitz. CVN-68/CVW-11 made a port visit to Busan, South Korea on 28 February in conjunction with military exercises Key Resolve/Foal Eagle. On 5 March, it was again reported that a Russian bomber overflew Nimitz off the Korean coast, two F/A-18s were sent up and intercepted the Russian aircraft as it was three to five nautical miles (9 km) from the carrier at an altitude of 2,000 feet (610 m).

On 19 May 2009 just before midnight, an HH-60H helicopter from the air wing crashed into the ocean 13 miles (21 km) south of San Diego and about 76 nautical miles (141 km) from Nimitz. As of 20 May, three crewmembers were confirmed dead with two more still missing.

On 28 July it was announced that CVW-11 and the Nimitz Strike Group was to depart for a seven-month deployment on 31 July.

Nimitz Strike Group, including CVW-11, departed the States for a scheduled Western Pacific deployment on 31 July 2009, and began to fly combat missions in support of Operation Enduring Freedom on 21 September.

On 11 June 2012, during carrier qualifications, the air wing commander, Captain Greg Harris, completed his 1000th arrested landing when he flew his F/A-18F Super Hornet strike fighter from squadron VFA-154 on board Nimitz.

CVW-11 made two additional deployments aboard Nimitz in 2013 and 2017, before being reassigned to USS Theodore Roosevelt in 2019. After participating in Exercise Northern Edge off Alaska in May 2019, CVW-11 was deployed aboard the Roosevelt in 2020, 2021 and 2024.

== Current force ==
=== Fixed-wing aircraft ===
- F/A-18E/F Super Hornet
- F-35C Lightning II
- EA-18G Growler
- E-2D Advanced Hawkeye
- CMV-22B Osprey

=== Rotary wing aircraft ===
- MH-60S Knighthawk
- MH-60R Seahawk

== See also ==
- History of the United States Navy
- List of United States Navy aircraft squadrons
- List of United States Navy Carrier air wings
- Carrier Strike Group Eleven
