= VFA-86 =

Strike Fighter Squadron 86
- Founded: 1 February 1951; 75 years ago
- Country: United States
- Branch: United States Navy
- Type: Fighter/Attack
- Role: Close air support Air interdiction Aerial reconnaissance
- Part of: Carrier Air Wing 11
- Garrison/HQ: NAS Lemoore
- Nickname: Sidewinders
- Motto: When diplomacy fails...86 ‘em!
- Colors: N/A
- Engagements: Vietnam War; Operation Eagle Claw; Gulf War; Operation Deny Flight; Operation Deliberate Force; Operation Southern Watch; Operation Enduring Freedom; Iraq War; Operation Inherent Resolve

Aircraft flown
- Attack: A-4B/C/E Skyhawk; A-7A/C/E Corsair II
- Fighter: F4U-4 Corsair; F8F-2 Bearcat; F9F-5 Panther; F7U-3M Cutlass; F/A-18C Hornet; F/A-18E Super Hornet; F-35C Lightning II

Strike Fighter Squadron 86 (VFA-86) is a strike fighter squadron of the United States Navy. It is equipped with the F-35C Lightning II and is stationed at Naval Air Station Lemoore, California. The squadron is nicknamed "Sidewinders", leading to the call sign Winder. The unit is currently assigned to Carrier Air Wing 11 tail code NH.

The unit's patch appears in Top Gun: Maverick, worn by Greg Tarzan Davis.

== History ==
=== 1950s ===
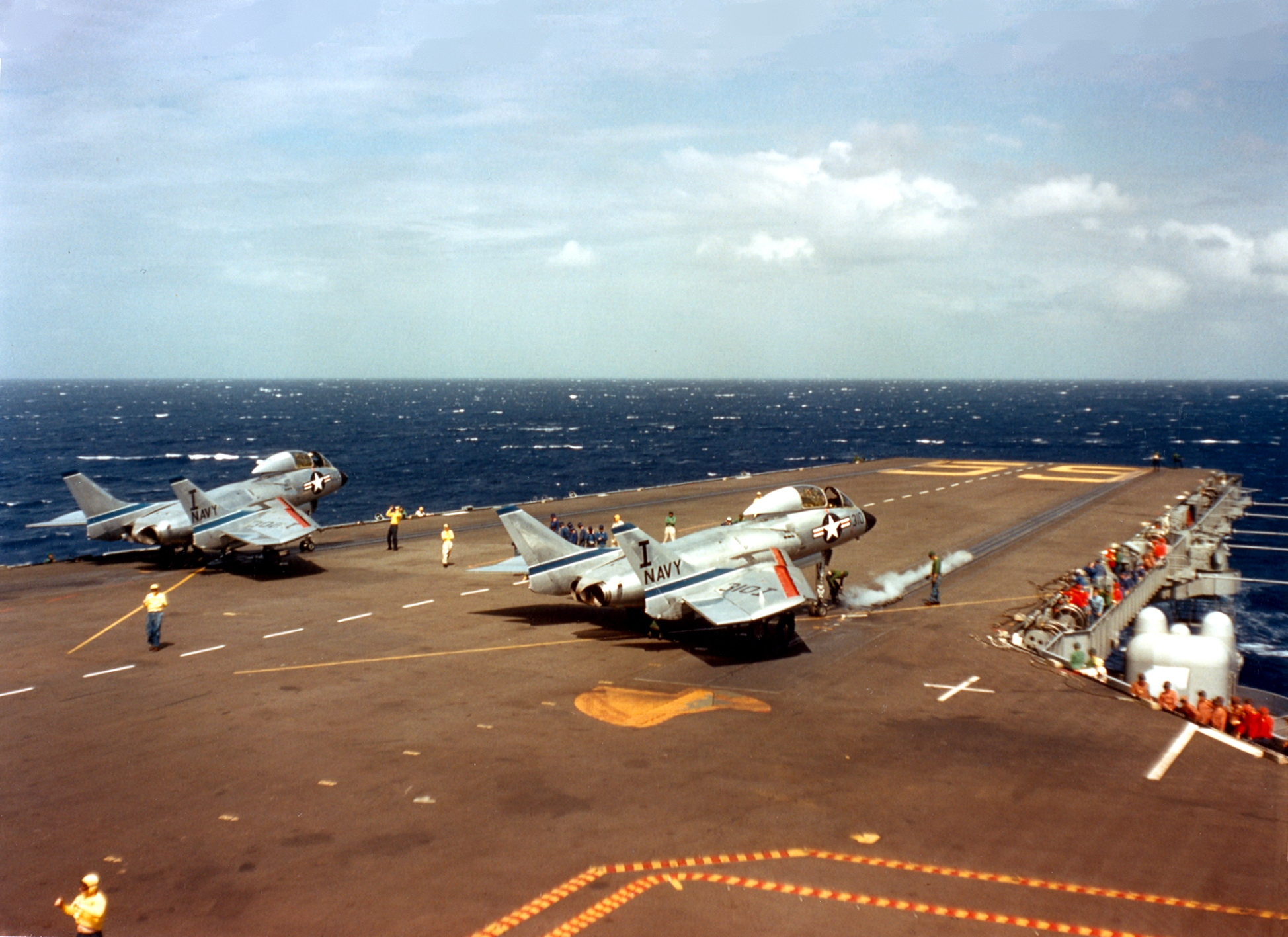
VA-86 F7U-3Ms aboard USS Forrestal

Reserve Fighter Squadron 921 (VF-921) was called to active duty from NAS St. Louis on 1 February 1951, for the Korean War flying the F4U-4 Corsair. VF-921 was assigned to Carrier Air Group Eight and deployed to the Mediterranean Sea aboard USS Tarawa, in 1951–52. On 4 February 1953, the squadron was redesignated Fighter Squadron 84 (VF-84), while deployed to Naval Station Guantanamo Bay, Cuba aboard USS Antietam. In June 1953, the squadron briefly flew the F8F-2 Bearcat in preparation for transition to the F9F-5 Panther in November 1953. The squadron's current "Sidewinder" name and insignia were adopted in April 1954. Flying the Panther, VF-84 was again deployed to the Mediterranean Sea aboard USS Lake Champlain from September 1954 to April 1955.

On 1 July 1955, the squadron began flying the F7U-3M Cutlass, was redesignated Attack Squadron 86 (VA-86), and conducted extensive evaluation of the AIM-7 Sparrow missile. VA-86 was deployed with the F7U only for the shakedown cruise of USS Forrestal, being assigned to Air Task Group 181.

From May 1957 until 1967, the squadron was assigned to Carrier Air Wing Seven, being equipped with various marks of the A4D/A-4 Skyhawk. Between September 1958 and March 1959, VA-86 was deployed aboard USS Randolph, before CVW-7 was reassigned to the recently commissioned USS Independence.

=== 1960s ===
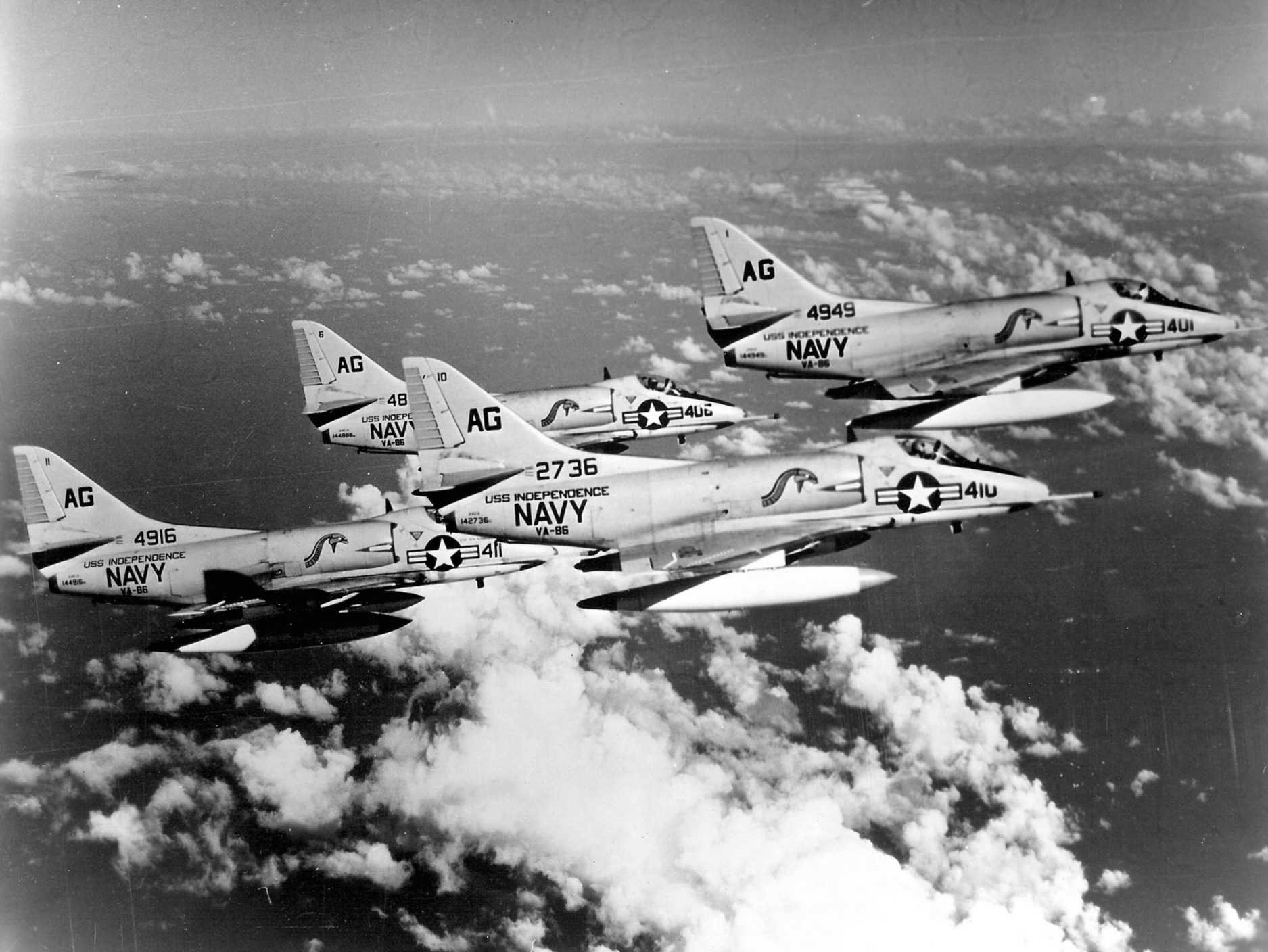
VA-86 A4D-2 Skyhawks in 1960

In April 1961, VA-86 operated from USS Independence near Guantanamo Bay, Cuba, during the Bay of Pigs Invasion. In November 1962, the squadron was assigned to Carrier Air Wing Three and embarked in USS Lexington during the Cuban Missile Crisis operating off the coast of Jacksonville, Florida. VA-86 was flying a mix of A-4Bs and A-4Cs, as the squadron was transitioning to the A-4C. In April–May 1963, VA-86 provided A-4C detachments aboard Atlantic Fleet anti-submarine carriers USS Essex, USS Randolph and USS Wasp. The aircraft were equipped with AIM-9 Sidewinder missiles to provide the carriers with anti-air warfare capability.

From August 1963 to March 1964, VA-86 was again deployed with CVW-7 aboard USS Independence to the Mediterranean Sea. Following this deployment, the squadron transitioned to the A-4E. On 1 July 1965, the squadron conducted its first combat missions, flying from Independence against targets in South Vietnam. In 1966–67, VA-86 was back in the Mediterranean Sea aboard Independence.

On 1 June 1967, VA-86 became the Navy's first operational Atlantic Fleet squadron to fly the A-7A Corsair II. VA-86 was reassigned to Carrier Air Wing Six and made another deployment to Vietnam aboard USS America. The squadron conducted its third South East Asia combat deployment aboard USS Coral Sea from September 1969 to July 1970 while being assigned to Carrier Air Wing Fifteen. In October 1970, VA-86 transitioned to the E model of the A-7.

=== 1970s ===
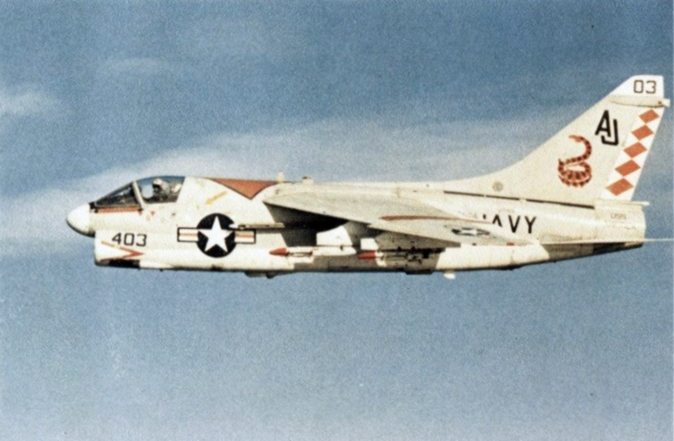
VA-86 A-7C in 1974

From 1971 to 1987, VA-86 was again assigned to CVW-8. In late spring of 1972, VA-86 was forced to transition to the A-7C due to unexpected problems with the A-7E's TF-41 engines. The squadron then deployed from June 1972 to March 1973 aboard USS America for a ten-month combat cruise, participating in several intense and lengthy bombing campaigns, including Operation Linebacker and Linebacker II in late-1972. The squadron remained on station until the Paris Peace Accords were signed in late January 1973. This was the squadron's fourth combat deployment to Southeast Asia, more than any other East Coast attack squadron and resulted in the receipt of the Meritorious Unit Commendation.

The squadron deployed aboard USS America in 1974 for 7 months duty in the Mediterranean and the North Sea. In 1975, the squadron transitioned to the A-7E and went aboard USS Nimitz for the ship's maiden voyage and made further deployments during the late 1970s and 1980s. In 1979, VA-86 planes appeared in the movie The Final Countdown, which was filmed aboard USS Nimitz at Naval Air Station Key West, Florida.

=== 1980s ===
In January 1980, after the seizure of the American Embassy in Tehran, Iran VA-86 departed Naples, Italy embarked on Nimitz, en route to the Indian Ocean via the Cape of Good Hope, beginning of 144 consecutive days at sea.

In 1981, while aboard Nimitz, the squadron participated in a Freedom of Navigation Exercise in the Gulf of Sidra. During this tense period, VA-86 flew Aerial refuelling and reconnaissance missions over potentially hostile Libyan ships.

The squadron awarded the 1982 COMNAVAIRLANT Battle "E", as the best East Coast A-7 squadron.

In June- July 1985, while aboard USS Nimitz, VA-86 operated off the coast of Lebanon due to the hijacking of TWA flight 847, and later that year the squadron was awarded the Wade McClusky Award, signifying the most outstanding attack squadron in the Navy.

From January–February 1987, while embarked on USS Nimitz, VA-86 operated off the coast of Lebanon after three U.S. citizens were taken hostage from the American University in Beirut, Lebanon.

On 15 July 1987, VA-86 was officially redesignated Strike Fighter Squadron 86 (VFA-86), and began flying the F/A-18C Hornet. VA-86 was the first East Coast squadron to receive the C model (Lot 10) of the F/A-18. From 1988 to 2007, VFA-86 was assigned to Carrier Air Wing One. In 1989, during a six-month deployment aboard America, VFA-86 provided air cover for the evacuation of the U.S. Embassy in Beirut.

=== 1990s ===
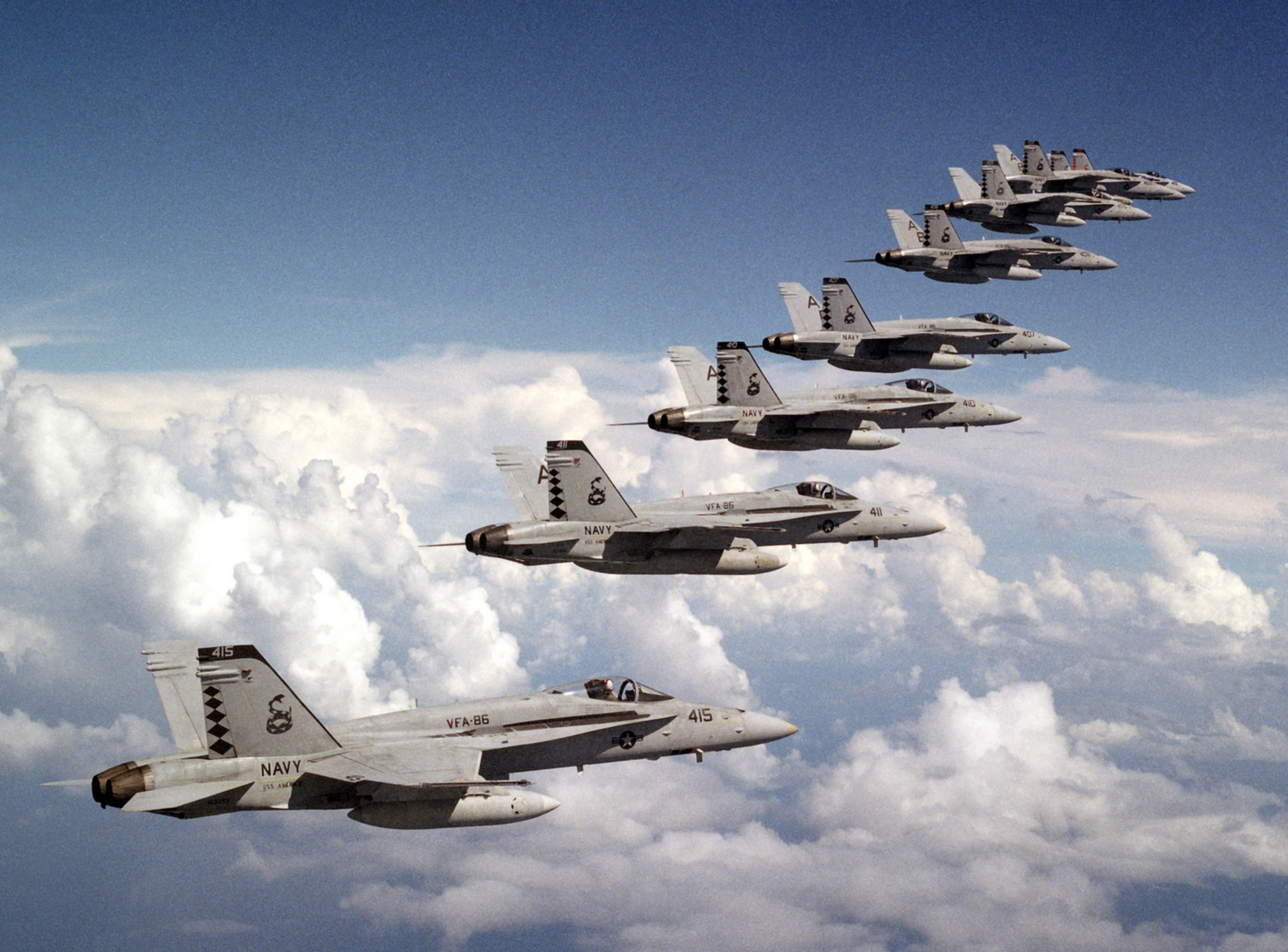
VFA-86 F/A-18Cs in 1995

In 1991, the squadron flew combat missions in support of Operation Desert Storm from USS America operating in both the Red Sea and the Persian Gulf.

In 1992, the squadron accomplished the first East Coast F/A-18 Standoff Land Attack Missile shoot to a target on San Nicolas Island, California.

In 1994, the squadron deployed aboard America in support of Operation Deny Flight. In October, USS America was ordered to the Indian Ocean off the coast of Somalia in support of United Nations relief efforts. After conducting NATO Operation Deliberate Force missions over Bosnia-Herzegovina from the Adriatic Sea, they returned to NAS Cecil Field in February 1995. The squadron received the CNO's Safety "S" Award for 1995.

On 3 October 1997, the squadron deployed to the Mediterranean Sea/Persian Gulf aboard USS George Washington. The squadron remained on station in the Gulf through mid-March 1998 during the crisis involving Iraq's non-compliance with UN sanctions, flying Operation Southern Watch contingency missions. VFA-86 was awarded the 1997 Battle E recognizing it as the best East Coast F/A-18 Hornet squadron. From 2 November 1998 to 17 December 1998, VFA-86 made a short cruise to the Puerto Rican Operating Area aboard USS Harry S. Truman. On 22 September 1999 the squadron deployed to the Mediterranean Sea/Arabian aboard USS John F. Kennedy, participating in Freedom of Navigation Operations off the coast of Libya.

Following the decommissioning of NAS Cecil Field in 1999 due to BRAC action, VFA-86 was one of two U.S. Navy strike fighter squadrons that relocated to MCAS Beaufort, South Carolina in lieu of NAS Oceana, Virginia. The other Navy squadron at MCAS Beaufort, VFA-82, was deactivated in 2005.

=== 2000s ===
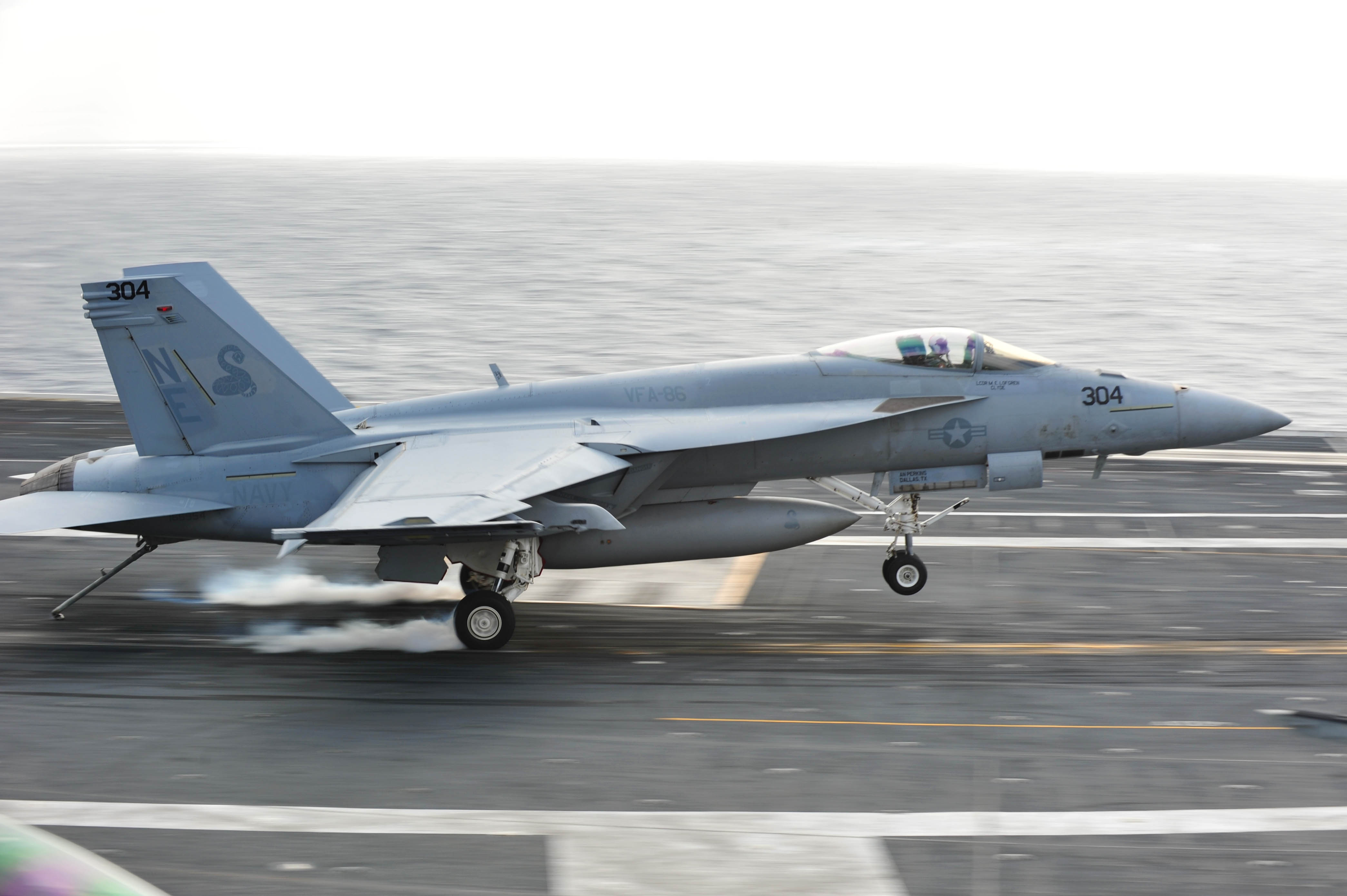
VFA-86 F/A-18E lands aboard USS Ronald Reagan in 2013

On 19 September 2001, the squadron deployed aboard USS Theodore Roosevelt, in support of Operation Enduring Freedom (OEF) over Afghanistan against Taliban and Al Qaeda military targets. When they departed the area on 2 March 2002, the squadron had flown over 3500 hours and expended over 213 tons of ordnance and were at sea for 160 continuous days.

From August 2003 to July 2004, VFA-86 deployed in USS Enterprise in support of Operation Iraqi Freedom (OIF) and OEF.

From May to November 2006, the squadron was again deployed on the USS Enterprise in support of OIF and OEF, visiting ports in Croatia, Crete, Dubai, Hong Kong, South Korea, Malaysia and Portugal. In July 2007, VFA-86 deployed for a last time aboard USS Enterprise in support of OIF and OEF, returning MCAS Beaufort in December 2007. The squadron earned the 2007 Commander Naval Air Forces U.S. Atlantic Fleet Safety "S."

Between 31 July 2009 and 26 March 2010, VFA-86 deployed aboard USS Nimitz to the Western Pacific and the North Arabian Sea, being assigned to Carrier Air Wing Eleven.

=== 2010s ===
In 2011, the squadron relocated from MCAS Beaufort to NAS Lemoore. After their arrival, they transitioned to the F/A-18E Super Hornet. VFA-86 was then assigned to Carrier Air Wing Two aboard USS Ronald Reagan. After transferring to Carrier Air Wing Seven, VFA-86 deployed aboard the USS Abraham Lincoln in 2019.

=== 2020s ===
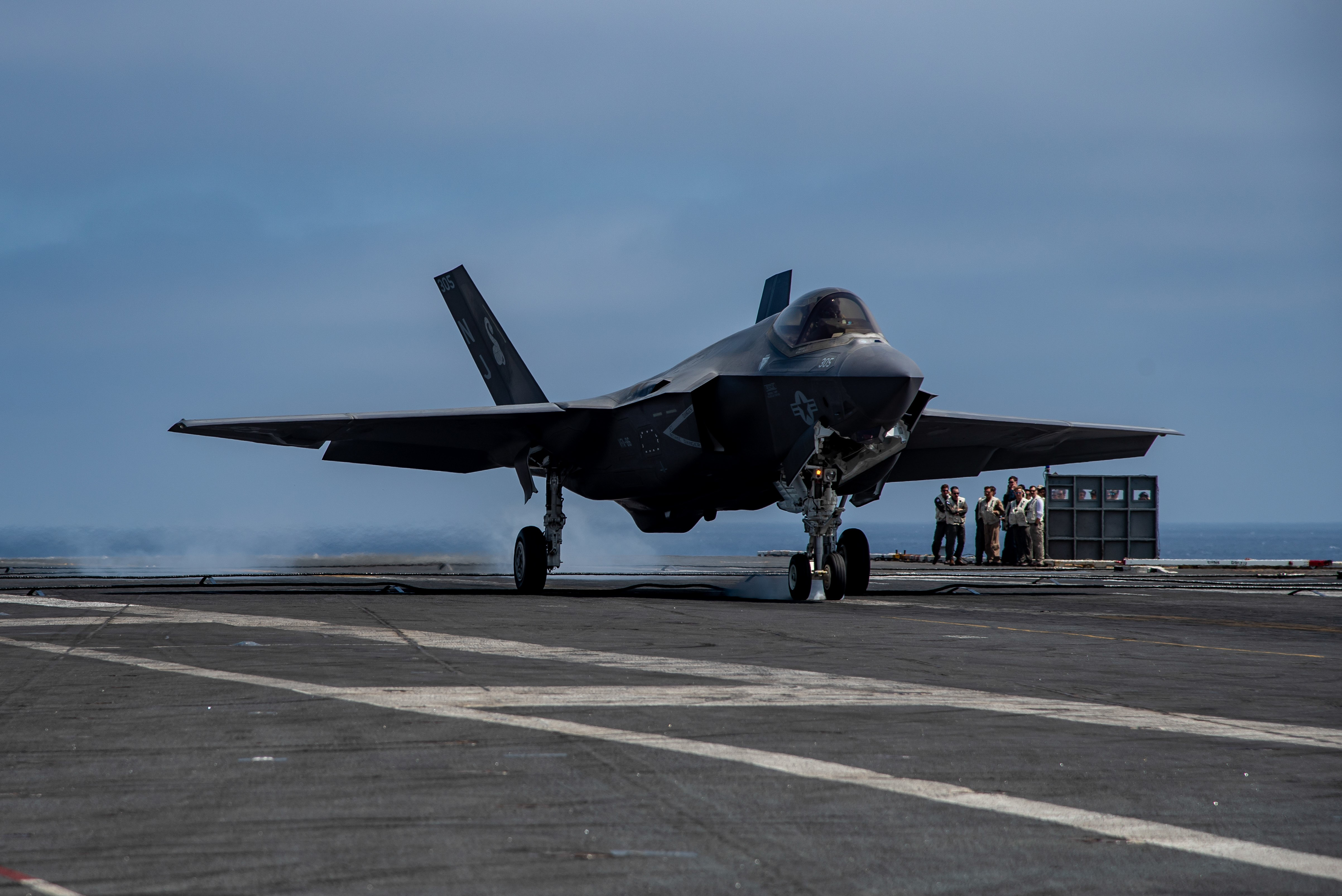
An F-35C Lightning II from the "Sidewinders" of Strike Fighter Squadron (VFA) 86 performs a touch and go on the flight deck of the aircraft carrier USS Nimitz (CVN 68) in the Pacific Ocean, July 26, 2024.

In 2022, it was announced that the squadron will transition to the F-35C Lightning II in 2023. According to the Commanding Officer of VFA-86 at the time, Commander Daniel Krause, the squadron was still on track for its “exciting transition” to the F-35C as of 22 April 2023. Between 28 May 2023 and 13 November 2023, the official U.S. Navy page description of the squadron changed from "VFA-86 is an F/A-18E Super Hornet strike fighter squadron attached to Carrier Air Wing (CVW) 7" to "VFA-86 is an F-35C Lightning II strike fighter squadron attached to Joint Strike Fighter Wing Pacific" signaling that the transition had been completed. In late June 2025, the squadron had been reassigned to Carrier Air Wing 11.

== See also ==
- Naval aviation
- Modern US Navy carrier air operations
- List of United States Navy aircraft squadrons
- List of Inactive United States Navy aircraft squadrons
