= USS Roosevelt =

Several ships of the United States Navy have borne some version of the name Roosevelt in honor of members of the Roosevelt family.

- USS Kermit Roosevelt (ARG-16), a Luzon-class repair ship that saw service during World War II.
- USS Franklin D. Roosevelt (CV-42), a Midway-class aircraft carrier, launched in 1945 and struck in 1977.
- USS Roosevelt (SP-2397), a patrol vessel in commission from 1918 to 1919, named for President Theodore Roosevelt
- USS Roosevelt (DDG-80), an Arleigh Burke-class destroyer, launched in 1999 and currently in service. She was named for both President Franklin D. Roosevelt and his wife, Eleanor Roosevelt.

Three of the ships have been named USS Theodore Roosevelt, in honor of President Theodore Roosevelt.

- USS Theodore Roosevelt (ID-1478), a steamer built in 1906, acquired by the Navy from the Roosevelt Steamship Company sometime in 1918 and fitted out as a troop transport.
- USS Theodore Roosevelt (SSBN-600), a George Washington-class ballistic missile submarine, launched in 1959 and stricken in 1982.
- USS Theodore Roosevelt (CVN-71), a Nimitz-class aircraft carrier launched in 1984 and currently in active service
