= USS Theodore Roosevelt (CVN-71) =

US Navy Nimitz-class aircraft carrier

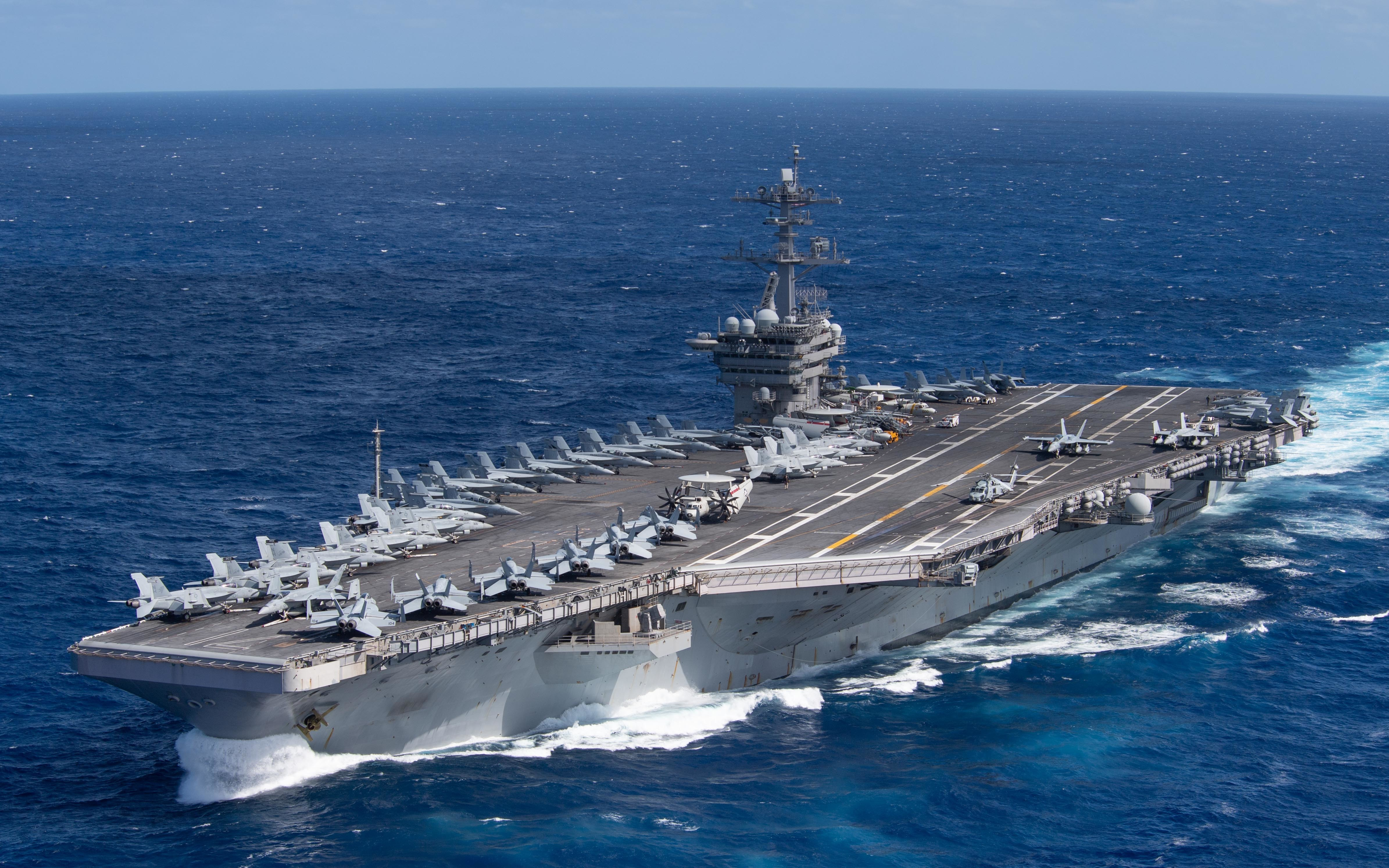
- USS Theodore Roosevelt (CVN-71)

History

United States
- Name: Theodore Roosevelt
- Namesake: Theodore Roosevelt
- Ordered: 30 September 1980
- Builder: Newport News Shipbuilding
- Cost: $4.5 billion (2007 dollars)
- Laid down: 31 October 1981
- Launched: 27 October 1984
- Christened: 27 October 1984
- Acquired: 17 October 1986
- Commissioned: 25 October 1986
- Home port: San Diego
- Identification: MMSI number: 366984000; Callsign: NNTR; Hull number: CVN-71
- Motto: Qui Plantavit Curabit; (He who has planted will preserve)
- Nickname(s): TR; Big Stick
- Status: in active service
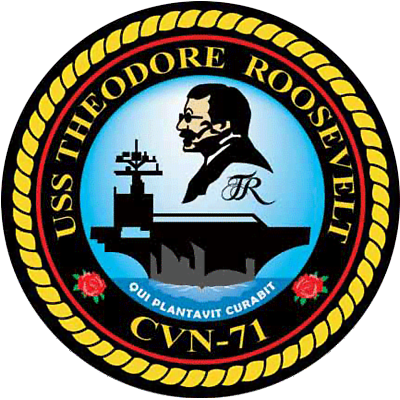
- Badge

General characteristics
- Class & type: Nimitz-class aircraft carrier
- Displacement: 104,600 long tons (106,300 t)
- Length: Overall: 1,092 feet (332.8 m); Waterline: 1,040 feet (317.0 m)
- Beam: Overall: 252 feet (76.8 m); Waterline: 134 feet (40.8 m)
- Draft: Maximum navigational: 37 feet (11.3 m); Limit: 41 feet (12.5 m)
- Propulsion: 2 × Westinghouse A4W nuclear reactors; 4 × steam turbines driving 4 × shafts; 260,000 shp (194 MW)
- Speed: 30 knots (56 km/h; 35 mph)+
- Range: Unlimited distance; 20–25 years
- Endurance: Limited only by food and supplies
- Complement: Ship's company: 3,200; Air wing: 2,480
- Sensors & processing systems: AN/SPS-48E 3-D air search radar; AN/SPS-49(V)5 2-D air search radar; AN/SPQ-9B target acquisition radar; AN/SPN-46 air traffic control radars; AN/SPN-43C air traffic control radar; AN/SPN-41 landing aid radars; 4 × Mk 91 NSSM guidance systems; 4 × Mk 95 radars
- Electronic warfare & decoys: AN/SLQ-32A(V)4 countermeasures suite; SLQ-25A Nixie torpedo countermeasures
- Armament: 2 × Sea Sparrow; 2 × RIM-116 Rolling Airframe Missile; 2 × Phalanx CIWS (close-in weapon system) Gatling guns
- Armor: 63.5 mm Kevlar armor over vitals
- Aircraft carried: 90 fixed wing and helicopters

USS Theodore Roosevelt (CVN-71) is the fourth Nimitz-class, nuclear-powered, aircraft carrier in the United States Navy. She is named in honor of Theodore Roosevelt, the 26th president of the United States and a proponent of naval power. She is the fourth ship named in honor of Theodore Roosevelt, three bearing his full name and a fourth with just his last name. Another three U.S. Navy ships have "Roosevelt" in their names in honor of members of the Roosevelt family.

This carrier's radio call sign is "Rough Rider", the nickname of President Roosevelt's volunteer cavalry unit during the Spanish–American War. She was launched in 1984, and saw her first action during the Gulf War in 1991. As of August 2024, she is deployed with Carrier Air Wing 11 and Carrier Strike Group 9 and the Arleigh Burke-class destroyers USS John S. McCain, USS Halsey, and USS Daniel Inouye.

== Background ==
Initially, President Gerald Ford cancelled the order for CVN-71 in 1976 and substituted two CVV-type medium-sized, conventional-powered carriers that were expected to operate V/STOL aircraft. The existing T-CBL design formed the basis for the new CVV, serving as a replacement for the aging Midway-class carriers, while capable of operating all existing conventional carrier aircraft. This capability to operate conventional aircraft proved important as the hoped-for supersonic V/STOL fighters did not come to fruition at the time. In any case, construction of the proposed CVV medium-sized carrier never took place.

Authorization for CVN-71 was further delayed when President Jimmy Carter vetoed the 1979 Fiscal Year Department of Defense authorization bill because of the inclusion of this Nimitz-class nuclear supercarrier in the Navy ship-building program. As a result of the Iran hostage crisis, which required the increased deployment of U.S. carrier battle groups to the Indian Ocean, President Carter reversed his stand on Nimitz-class nuclear supercarriers, and CVN-71 was subsequently authorized under the 1980 Fiscal Year authorization bill for the U.S. Department of Defense.

== Design and construction ==
Theodore Roosevelt was the first aircraft carrier to be assembled using modular construction, wherein large modules are independently constructed in "lay-down" areas, prior to being hoisted into place and welded together. Modular construction, made possible through the use of a huge gantry crane capable of lifting 900 tons, cut 16 months off Theodore Roosevelt's construction time, and the technique has been used on every aircraft carrier since. Theodore Roosevelt and those Nimitz-class vessels completed after her have slight structural differences from the earlier carriers (USS Nimitz, USS Dwight D. Eisenhower, and USS Carl Vinson) and improved protection for ordnance storage in her magazines.

Theodore Roosevelt's history began on 30 September 1980, when a contract was awarded for "Hull 624D" to Newport News Shipbuilding. Her keel was laid down on 31 October 1981, with Secretary of Defense Caspar Weinberger initiating the first weld. On 3 November 1981, Secretary of the Navy John F. Lehman announced that the carrier would be named for Theodore Roosevelt. The vessel's Pre-Commissioning Unit (PCU) was formed in February 1984, with Captain Paul W. Parcells named as commanding officer. On 27 October 1984, the ship was officially christened by Mrs. Barbara Lehman, wife of Secretary Lehman. On 25 October 1986, Theodore Roosevelt was commissioned to active service at Newport News.

== Service history ==
=== Maiden deployment ===
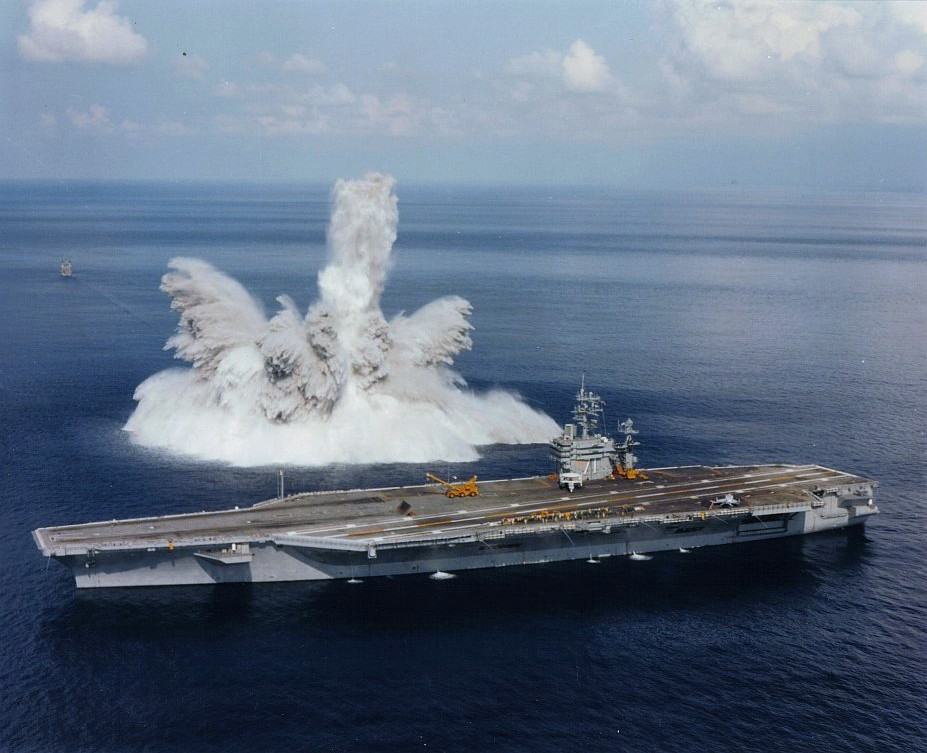
Shock test of Theodore Roosevelt during sea trials in 1987

After sea trials and pre-deployment workups, Theodore Roosevelt started her maiden deployment on 30 December 1988 with Carrier Air Wing Eight (CVW-8) embarked. The ship patrolled the Mediterranean Sea prior to returning on 30 June 1989. She was awarded the 1989 Battle "E" from Commander, Naval Air Force U.S. Atlantic Fleet on 20 March 1990.

=== 1990s ===
On 28 December 1990, Theodore Roosevelt and CVW-8 deployed for Operation Desert Shield, arriving in the Persian Gulf on 16 January 1991. With the commencement of Operation Desert Storm on 15 January 1991, Theodore Roosevelt began combat operations; eventually flying 3,897 sorties, more than any other carrier, and dropping more than 4,800,000 pounds (2,200 metric tons) of ordnance before the cease-fire on 28 February.

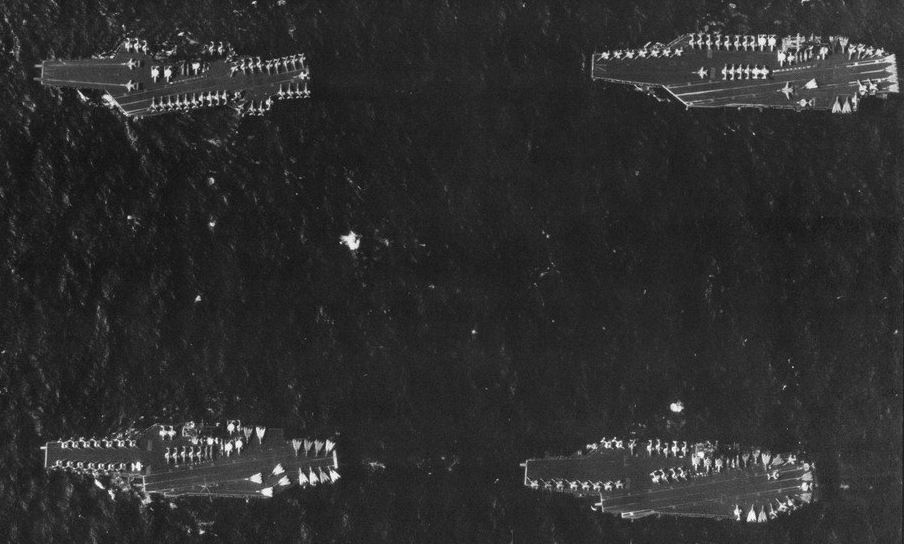
Four U.S. Navy carriers form "Battle Force Zulu" following the 1991 Gulf War; Theodore Roosevelt (top right) cruises with Midway (top left), Ranger (bottom left) and America (bottom right)

When Iraqi forces turned on the Kurds, Theodore Roosevelt and CVW-8 were among the first coalition forces in Operation Provide Comfort, flying patrols over northern Iraq. After a 189-day deployment, with 176 days at sea, Theodore Roosevelt returned to Norfolk on 28 June 1991. On 14 February 1992, the ship won her second Battle "E". This was followed by the award of the Battenberg Cup for 1991 as the Atlantic Fleet's premiere ship.

Theodore Roosevelt began her third deployment on 11 March 1993, again with CVW-8 embarked. Also embarked was a Special Purpose Marine Air-Ground Task Force (SPMAGTF), in a test of the concept of embarking a multi-purpose Marine force in a carrier. While the ship was still in the Virginia Capes operating area, President Bill Clinton flew aboard for several hours for his first visit to a U.S. Navy ship. Theodore Roosevelt operated in the Adriatic as CVW-8 planes enforced Operation Deny Flight in the U.S. no-fly zone over Bosnia. In June, on the way to only her second port visit, Theodore Roosevelt was ordered instead to transit the Suez Canal en route to the Red Sea to participate in Operation Southern Watch, enforcing the no-fly zone over Iraq. Deployed for 184 days, Theodore Roosevelt spent 169 days under way prior to return in September 1993. For the accomplishments of her crew, the ship received her second Meritorious Unit Commendation.

From November 1993 to April 1994, Theodore Roosevelt conducted a Selected Restricted Availability (SRA) at Norfolk Naval Shipyard (NNSY), completing ahead of schedule. On 10 March 1994, Theodore Roosevelt received her third Battle "E". Then on 3 June, Theodore Roosevelt was awarded her second Battenberg Cup as the best ship in the Atlantic Fleet.

Theodore Roosevelt and CVW-8 began their fourth deployment in March 1995, operating in the Red Sea in support of Operation Southern Watch over Iraq, and Operations Deny Flight and Sharp Guard over the skies of Bosnia and in the Adriatic operating areas. Deny Flight evolved into Operation Deliberate Force, as CVW-8 aircraft led NATO strikes against strategic Bosnian Serb targets in Bosnia-Herzegovina. The Theodore Roosevelt Battle Group returned to Norfolk, Virginia in September 1995 and was awarded the Navy Unit Commendation for its Bosnia operations.

On 14 October 1996, Theodore Roosevelt collided with USS Leyte Gulf, a Ticonderoga-class guided missile cruiser, while conducting operations off the coast of North Carolina. The incident occurred as the carrier, without prior warning, reversed her engines while Leyte Gulf was behind her and collided with the cruiser's bow. There were no injuries reported, but Theodore Roosevelt suffered more than $7 million damage to her stern, while damages to Leyte Gulf's bow were assessed at $2 million.

Theodore Roosevelt deployed for her fifth deployment on 25 November 1996, with CVW-3 embarked, in support of Operation Southern Watch in the Mediterranean and Persian Gulf. The ship returned from deployment in May 1997. On 8 July 1997, Theodore Roosevelt entered the Newport News Shipbuilding yard for a one-year Extended Drydock and Selected Restricted Availability (EDSRA), her first major overhaul since commissioning.

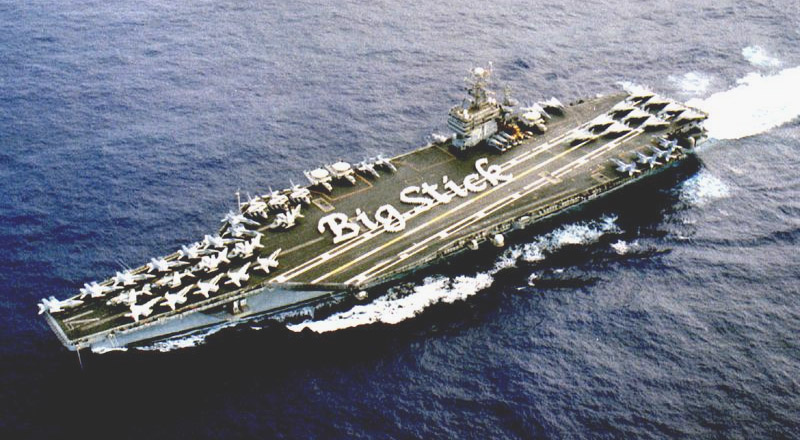
Theodore Roosevelt underway in 1999

From 1 February to 4 March 1999 Theodore Roosevelt participated in exercise JTFEX / TMDI99 along with the Brazilian Navy and several NATO navies. During the exercise, Theodore Roosevelt was mock-sunk, along with eight other U.S. ships, many of which were the carrier's escorts, by the submarine HNLMS Walrus of the Royal Netherlands Navy.

Theodore Roosevelt began her sixth deployment on 26 March 1999 with CVW-8 embarked. They were immediately called to duty in the Ionian Sea to support NATO's Operation Allied Force. Theodore Roosevelt and CVW-8 aircraft conducted airstrikes for two months over the skies of Kosovo against Serbian positions. Theodore Roosevelt and CVW-8 were then dispatched to support Operation Southern Watch, enforcing the "no-fly zone" over Southern Iraq. Theodore Roosevelt returned to her home port of Norfolk, Virginia, on 24 September 1999.

=== 2000s ===
After the September 11 attacks, Theodore Roosevelt began her seventh deployment on 19 September 2001 with Carrier Air Wing One (CVW-1). On 15 October 2001, Theodore Roosevelt and CVW-1 entered the North Arabian Sea, joining the already-present Enterprise and Carl Vinson in conducting attacks against al-Qaeda in Afghanistan for Operation Enduring Freedom. Between departing Norfolk on 19 September 2001 and arriving in Bahrain for a liberty call on 27 February 2002, Theodore Roosevelt spent 160 consecutive days at sea, breaking the record for the longest period underway since World War II. Theodore Roosevelt returned to her homeport 27 March 2002 and was awarded the Navy Unit Commendation, 2001 Battenberg Cup, and 2001 Battle "E". From April to October 2002, Theodore Roosevelt conducted a Planned Incremental Availability maintenance period at Norfolk Naval Shipyard.

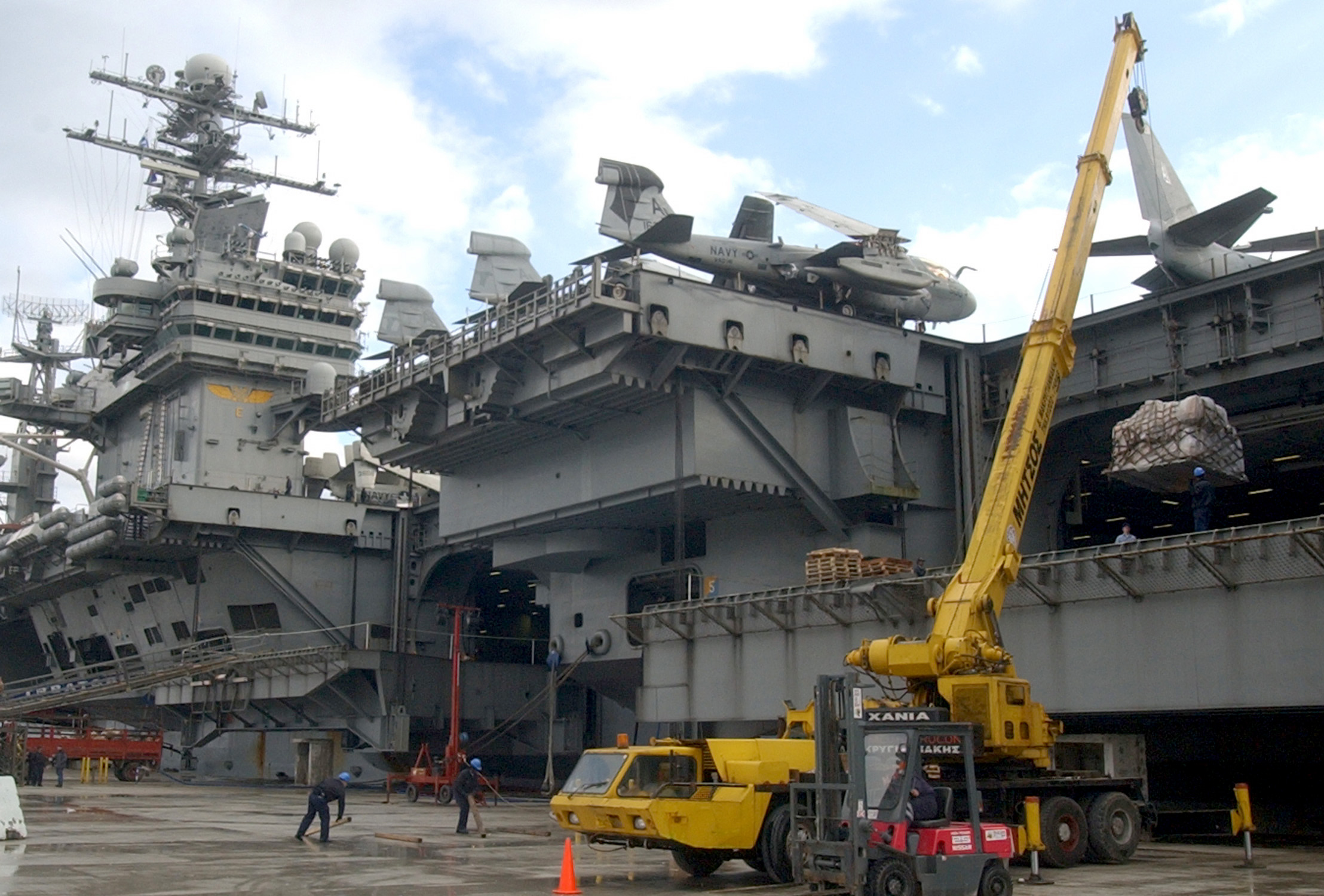
Theodore Roosevelt receives cargo while pierside at the NATO Marathi Pier Facility in Crete.

Theodore Roosevelt got underway on 6 January for a scheduled month-long training period in the Puerto Rican Operating Area. Near the end of January, Theodore Roosevelt received orders to proceed across the Atlantic to the Mediterranean Sea. Strike Fighter Squadron 201, based at Naval Air Station Naval Air Station Joint Reserve Base Fort Worth, Texas, was ordered to active duty as a unit of Carrier Air Wing (CVW) 8, the first Naval Reserve squadron to deploy aboard an aircraft carrier since the Korean War. Theodore Roosevelt arrived on station in the Eastern Mediterranean in February. On 22 March 2003 Theodore Roosevelt, along with USS Harry S. Truman, began launching air strikes into Iraq in support of Operation Iraqi Freedom. Theodore Roosevelt returned home on 26 May and was awarded the Meritorious Unit Commendation, the Navy Unit Citation, and the Global War on Terrorism Expeditionary Medal.

On 19 February 2004, Theodore Roosevelt entered a ten-month Docked Planned Incremental Availability (DPIA) at NNSY in Portsmouth. Major systems overhauled included AC systems, Steam and CHT (sewage) systems, 1MC (announcing) systems, communication, navigation, and detection suites, weapons elevator overhauls, propeller replacement, hull cleaning and painting, and sea valve replacement. Theodore Roosevelt came out of dry-dock in August and completed the maintenance availability on 17 December 2004.

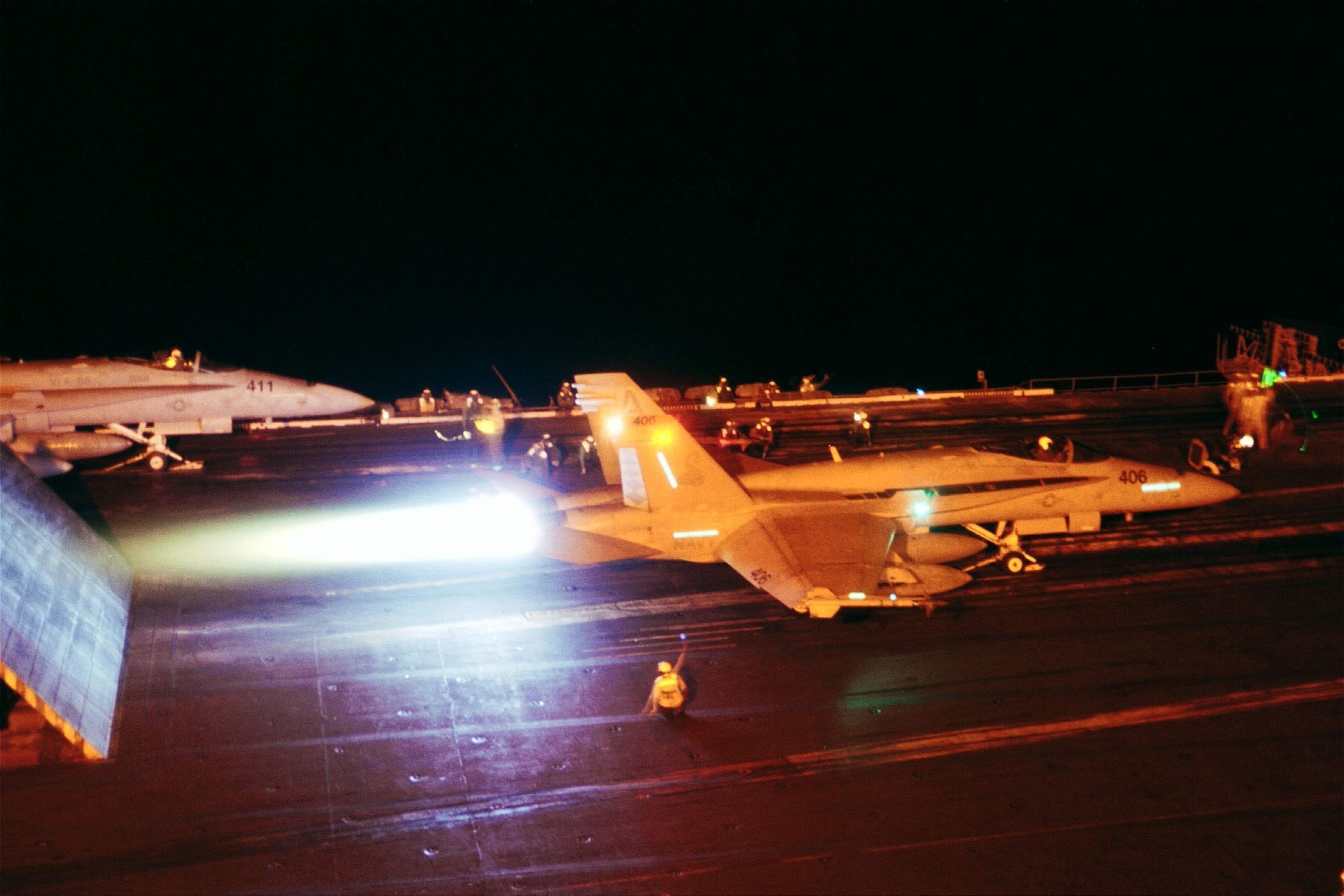
An F/A-18 Hornet from the "Sidewinders" of VFA-86 ignites its afterburners while preparing to be catapulted from the flight deck.

On 1 September 2005, Theodore Roosevelt deployed with CVW-8 embarked for a routine six-month mission to the Persian Gulf in support of Operation Iraqi Freedom (OIF), transiting the Suez Canal on 27 September and launching OIF missions beginning 6 October. This deployment was the last cruise for the F-14 Tomcat before its retirement in 2006. Theodore Roosevelt carried two Tomcat squadrons, VF-31 (Tomcatters) and VF-213 (Black Lions). Theodore Roosevelt returned to home port on 11 March 2006. Shortly after this cruise, Theodore Roosevelt earned the "Jig Dog" Ramage Carrier and Carrier Air Wing Operational Excellence Award, which is a Navy-wide award that is selected jointly by Type Commanders (TYCOM) and is presented to the Carrier/Air Wing team with the best performance as an integrated unit.

On 7 March 2007, Theodore Roosevelt began a nine-month Planned Incremental Availability (PIA) in Norfolk, which saw the addition of RAM-116 missiles among other upgrades.

CVW-8 and Theodore Roosevelt participated in Joint Task Force Exercise 08-4 Operation Brimstone off the coast of North Carolina between 21 and 31 July 2008. The British aircraft carrier HMS Ark Royal, the amphibious assault ship Iwo Jima with associated units and the Brazilian frigate Greenhalgh and the French submarine Améthyste also participated in the event.

Theodore Roosevelt left Norfolk on 8 September 2008 for a scheduled deployment to the Middle East with Carrier Air Wing Eight embarked. On 4 October 2008, the ship stopped at Cape Town, South Africa. This was the first visit to Cape Town by a nuclear-powered vessel since the German cargo ship Otto Hahn in the 1970s. Due to poor weather, approximately half of the ship's crew was unable to go ashore on liberty. Much of the crew that made it ashore were unable to return to Theodore Roosevelt due to the increasingly poor weather. The remaining crew was forced to remain on the pier till morning alongside the cruiser USS Monterey. The ship made four subsequent port stops in Jebel Ali, UAE, including one during the Christmas holiday. CVW-8 and CVN-71 supported Operation Enduring Freedom and flew more than 3,100 sorties and dropped more than 59,500 pounds (27,000 kg) of ordnance while providing close air support for ISAF-forces in Afghanistan.

On 21 March 2009, Theodore Roosevelt was relieved by Dwight D. Eisenhower. The carrier arrived at Norfolk on 18 April. On 26 August 2009 defense contractor Northrop Grumman was awarded a 2.4 billion dollar contract for Refueling and Complex Overhaul (RCOH) of Theodore Roosevelt at its Newport News shipyard.

=== 2010s ===
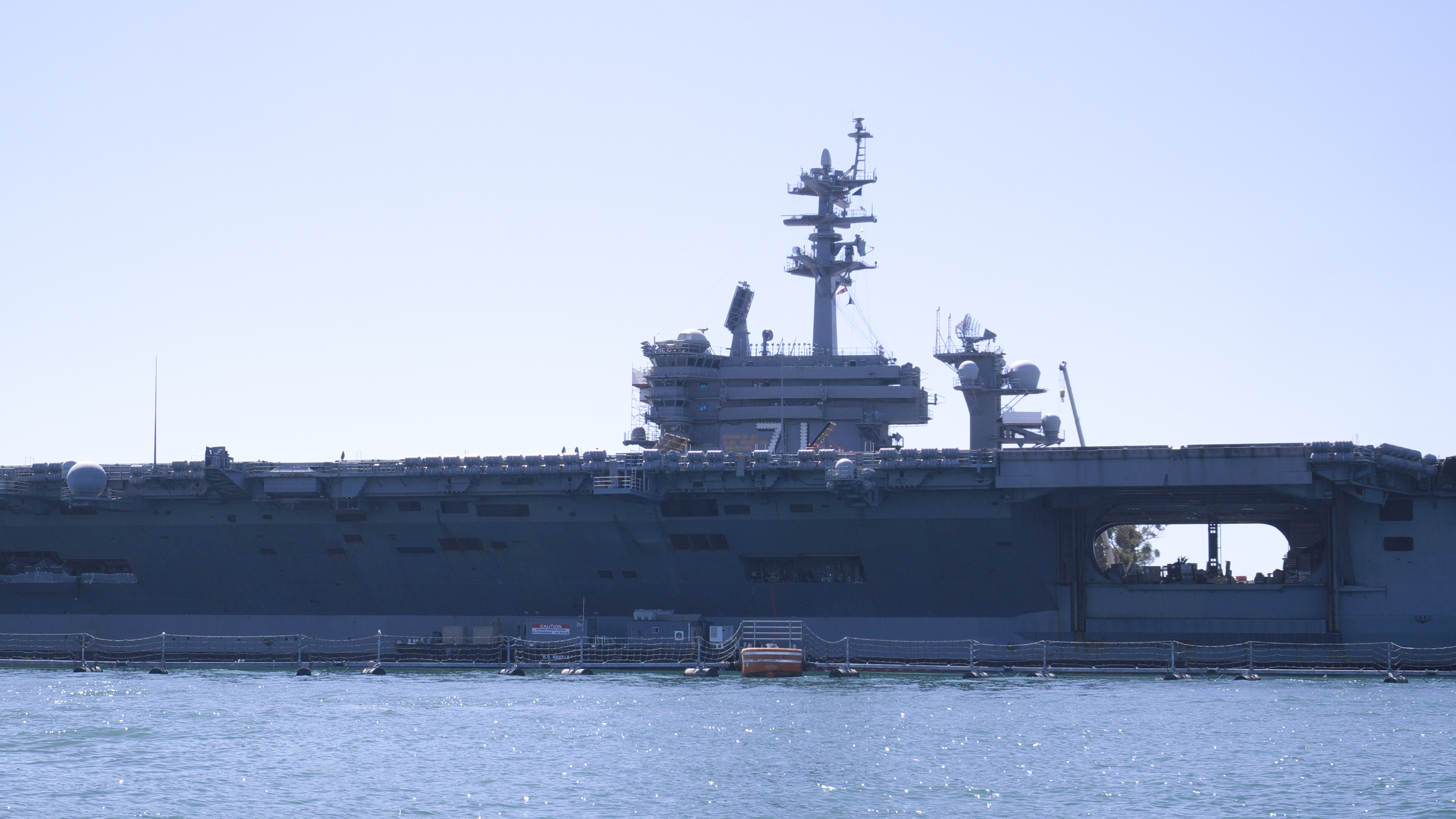
USS Theodore Roosevelt in October 2019

On 29 August 2013, Theodore Roosevelt returned to Norfolk Naval Station, Virginia, completing its post-overhaul sea trials that concluded its four-year mid-life RCOH. On 14 September 2013, Theodore Roosevelt successfully completed flight deck certification which entailed completing a total of 160 carrier landings during daytime and night-time operations. Other certification drills included rigging the emergency barricade, flight deck firefighting evolutions, and crash and salvage operations. On 17 September 2013, Theodore Roosevelt completed her first underway replenishment in over four years.

Flight testing for the X-47B continued on board Theodore Roosevelt on 10 November 2013. During this phase, the X-47B's digitized carrier-controlled environment was tested which involved the interface between the unmanned aircraft and carrier personnel during launching, flight operations and recovery. The digital environment offered increased flexibility and enhanced safety for carrier operations.

On 15 January 2014, the Navy announced that Theodore Roosevelt's homeport would move to San Diego, replacing USS Ronald Reagan when she relocated to Japan sometime in 2015 as part of the US Navy's preparation for the planned refueling of USS George Washington.

On 4 March 2015, during a training exercise off Florida, Theodore Roosevelt was mock-sunk by the French Navy submarine Saphir.

On 11 March 2015,Theodore Roosevelt and Carrier Strike Group 12 departed Naval Station Norfolk for an around the world tour with deployments to the U.S. 5th, 6th and 7th Fleets as part the first deployment of Naval Integrated Fire Control-Counter Air (NIFC-CA) Carrier Strike Group, before arriving in their new homeport of San Diego, California.

On 20 April 2015, Theodore Roosevelt, along with the cruiser USS Normandy, was deployed off the coast of Yemen to intercept suspected Iranian weapons shipments intended for Houthi rebels, who are engaged in a civil war with Yemeni government forces.

In early November 2015, Theodore Roosevelt along with the guided-missile destroyer USS Lassen, sailed to the South China Sea to assert freedom of navigation in the area claimed by China.

Theodore Roosevelt pulled into her new home port at San Diego on 23 November 2015, completing a deployment during which she circumnavigated the globe. The carrier launched 1,800 sorties against Islamic State militants in Iraq and Syria as part of Operation Inherent Resolve, totaling 10,618 flight hours and over 1 million pounds (450 metric tons) of ordnance employed through 1,085 guided munitions. Carrier Strike Group 12 traveled nearly 27,000 nmi (31,000 mi; 50,000 km) during the deployment, which also marked aviation milestones including the first operational use of the E-2D Advanced Hawkeye and the last active-duty operational deployment of the HH-60H Rescue Hawk and SH-60F Seahawk helicopters.

On 6 October 2017, Theodore Roosevelt departed San Diego for her deployment to the United States Seventh Fleet and United States Fifth Fleet area of operations, accompanied with Carrier Strike Group 9 and Carrier Air Wing Seventeen. On November 8, 2017, Theodore Roosevelt and her group started a 4-day exercise with two other carrier strike groups, led by carriers Ronald Reagan and Nimitz, in the Sea of Japan.

In May 2019, Theodore Roosevelt participated in Exercise Northern Edge 2019, marking the first time in a decade a carrier took part in the exercise. Also in 2019, Carrier Air Wing Eleven was transferred to the ship.

=== 2020s ===
On 5 March 2020, Theodore Roosevelt, along with the cruiser USS Bunker Hill, arrived at Da Nang, Vietnam, for a five-day port visit commemorating the 25th anniversary of United States–Vietnam relations.

==== COVID-19 pandemic ====
On 24 March 2020, during the COVID-19 pandemic, three sailors aboard the deployed vessel tested positive for COVID-19, a coronavirus disease identified as the cause of an outbreak of respiratory illness. Within a few days, that number climbed to dozens. Theodore Roosevelt was reported to be the first ship in the U.S. Navy to have a COVID-19 outbreak while at sea; Theodore Roosevelt docked at Guam on 27 March 2020.

By 31 March, the number of infected sailors was over 100, and the captain, Brett Crozier, pleaded for help from the Navy, sending an e-mail to ten Pacific Fleet admirals and captains, including his superior, the commander of Carrier Strike Group-9, and the commander of the Pacific Fleet, requesting that his ship be evacuated. The US Navy ordered the aircraft carrier evacuated with a skeleton crew of 400 to remain aboard the vessel to maintain the nuclear reactor, the fire-fighting equipment, and the ship's galley.

On 2 April, acting Navy Secretary Thomas Modly relieved Crozier of his command for sending the request for assistance over non-secure email to what he characterized as "broad array of people" rather than up the chain of command, adding that Crozier "allowed the complexity of the challenge of the COVID breakout on the ship to overwhelm his ability to act professionally". Crozier was to remain in the Navy and retain his rank. Several members of the House Armed Services Committee criticized the decision, stating that "the dismissal of Captain Crozier at this critical moment, as the sailors aboard the U.S.S. Theodore Roosevelt are confronted with the COVID-19 pandemic, is a reckless, political move that reeks of undue command influence." Captain Carlos A. Sardiello assumed temporary command of Theodore Roosevelt; his second stint serving as the ship's captain. Modly traveled to Guam and gave a ship-wide speech, which The New York Times described as a "tirade", during which he was heckled by some of the sailors. After demands from Congress that he be fired, Modly resigned on April 7.

As of Easter Sunday, 12 April, 585 crew members had tested positive. The Navy and the Centers for Disease Control (CDC) are using the infection, death, and recovery data from Theodore Roosevelt to study the pandemic. On 13 April, the hospitalized sailor, a chief petty officer, died. As of 20 April, 4,069 sailors had been moved off the ship, 94% of the crew had been tested for the virus, yielding 678 positive and 3,904 negative results. As of 17 April, seven crew members were in the hospital including one in intensive care. About 60% of the people who tested positive did not have symptoms. As of 16 April, most of the ship had been cleaned. Sailors kept testing positive for the virus even after 14 days of isolation; some who tested positive had previously tested negative. The Navy temporarily suspended post-quarantine testing and extended the sailors' isolation, delaying plans to begin moves of the crew back to the carrier. Some sailors volunteered for antibody testing. Initial testing was completed by 27 April 2020, at which point, 969 crew members had tested positive, and 14 of those 969 had recovered. By 29 April, sailors that were previously quarantined in Guam began moving back to the ship. Theodore Roosevelt returned to sea on 21 May for the first time after being sidelined for two months due to COVID-19.

On 19 June 2020, the widely expected reinstatement of Captain Crozier was canceled and the promotion of the Theodore Roosevelt strike group commander was put on hold. On 23 June USS Nimitz and Theodore Roosevelt completed a two-carrier operation in the Philippine Sea. Theodore Roosevelt was returning to home port when another chief petty officer suffered a medical emergency, of which the nature was not disclosed, and died 2 July 2020.

In a 10 November 2020 scientific brief, the CDC highlighted this case among several others to detail the community benefit of masking, as the use of face coverings on-board was demonstrated to be associated with a 70% reduced risk of infection. Final analysis of the outbreak in December 2020, found 1271 crew members tested positive for SARS-Cov-2 and an additional 60 had suspected COVID-19 but did not test positive; 76.9% of those who tested positive were asymptomatic at testing. 55% developed symptoms.

==== Return to service ====
In July 2021, she was moved from San Diego, her usual homeport, to Bremerton, Washington, where she was retrofitted to accommodate the F-35 multirole combat aircraft. A Navy spokesman said she was to be at the Bremerton shipyard for 16 to 18 months. Approximately 3,000 sailors and their families moved to Bremerton with the ship.

On 16 March 2022, Theodore Roosevelt was awarded her coveted fifth Battle "E" award when she received the 2021 Battle Efficiency Award for a West-Coast based aircraft carrier from Commander, Naval Air Forces Pacific. In addition to the Battle "E", the ship was also awarded the yellow "E" for Air Department, the black "E" for Aviation Intermediate Maintenance Department, the green "E" for Combat Systems, the Deck white crossed anchors, the blue "M" for Health Services, the Navigation white ship's wheel, the Reactor red "E", the Safety green "S", the Security black "S", the Supply blue "E", the Weapons black "W", the Carrier Maintenance purple "E" and the Environmental Protection and Energy Conservation award.

Theodore Roosevelt left Bremerton for sea trials in March 2023 and eventually returned to her previous homeport of San Diego.

Theodore Roosevelt deployed in January 2024 from Naval Air Station North Island in San Diego. On 19 March 2024, a F/A-18F Super Hornet from Carrier Air Wing 11 made the 250,000th successful arrested landing on her deck. In late-June 2024, she was ordered to the Middle East to relieve USS Dwight D. Eisenhower and to continue the U.S. presence in the region arriving there in July. In mid-July, US Navy's Carrier Strike Group 9 centered on Theodore Roosevelt along with Carrier Air Wing 11 and USS Daniel Inouye conducted an exercise with the Indian Navy's INS Aditya and INS Visakhapatnam in the Indian Ocean. She operated in conjunction with Abraham Lincoln from August until September before returning home on 14 October 2024 after 278 days on deployment.

As of early 2026, she was preparing for another deployment. As of 21 April 2026, the Theodore Roosevelt is the first supercarrier with an Unmanned Air Warfare Center (UAWC) with the ability to support MQ-25 Stingray tanker drones. As of 6 November it was in Changi Naval Base in Singapore and is expected to sail towards the Middle East. On 15 November, it joined the USS George H.W. Bush and USS George Washington to form a three-carrier US naval presence in the Middle East during the 2026 Iran war.

== Ship awards ==
- Joint Meritorious Unit Award
- Navy Unit Commendation (3 awards) – 1991, 1995, 2001
- Meritorious Unit Commendation – 1993, 2008
- Battle Efficiency Award (4 awards) – 1989, 1991, 1993, 2000
- National Defense Service Medal (2 awards) – 1990, 2001
- Armed Forces Expeditionary Medal
- Southwest Asia Service Medal (3 campaigns)
- Global War on Terrorism Expeditionary Medal
- Armed Forces Service Medal (2 campaigns)
- Sea Service Deployment Ribbon (9 overseas deployments)
- NATO Medal
- Kuwait Liberation Medal (Saudi Arabia)
- Kuwait Liberation Medal (Kuwait)
- Battenberg Cup (3 awards) – 1991, 1993, 2001
- Golden Anchor / Retention Excellence Award (7 awards) – 1988, 1993, 1994, 1995, 1997, 2004, 2017
- Security Excellence Award (2 awards) – 1996, 2009
- Captain Edward F. Ney Memorial Award for Outstanding Food Service (2 awards) – 2001, 2002
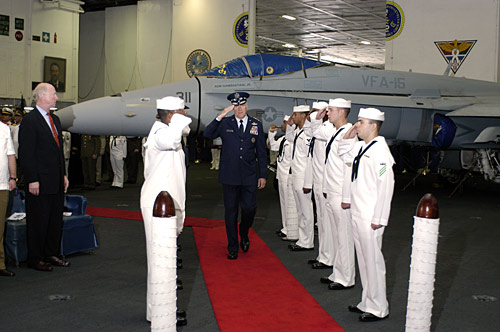
Chairman of the Joint Chiefs of Staff General Richard B. Myers during a visit to USS Theodore Roosevelt

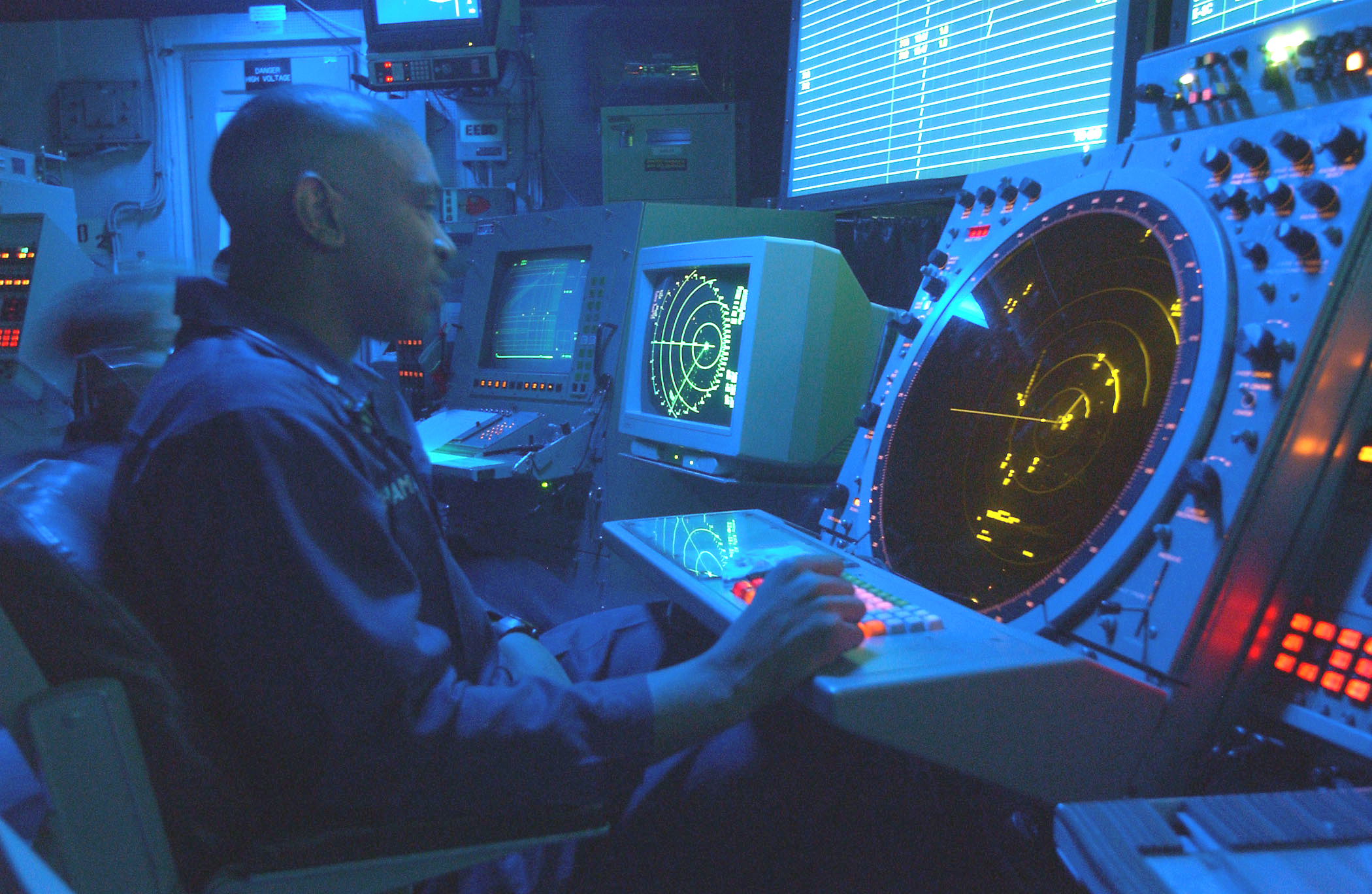
An air traffic controller watches his radar scope in the Carrier Air Traffic Control Center in 2002.

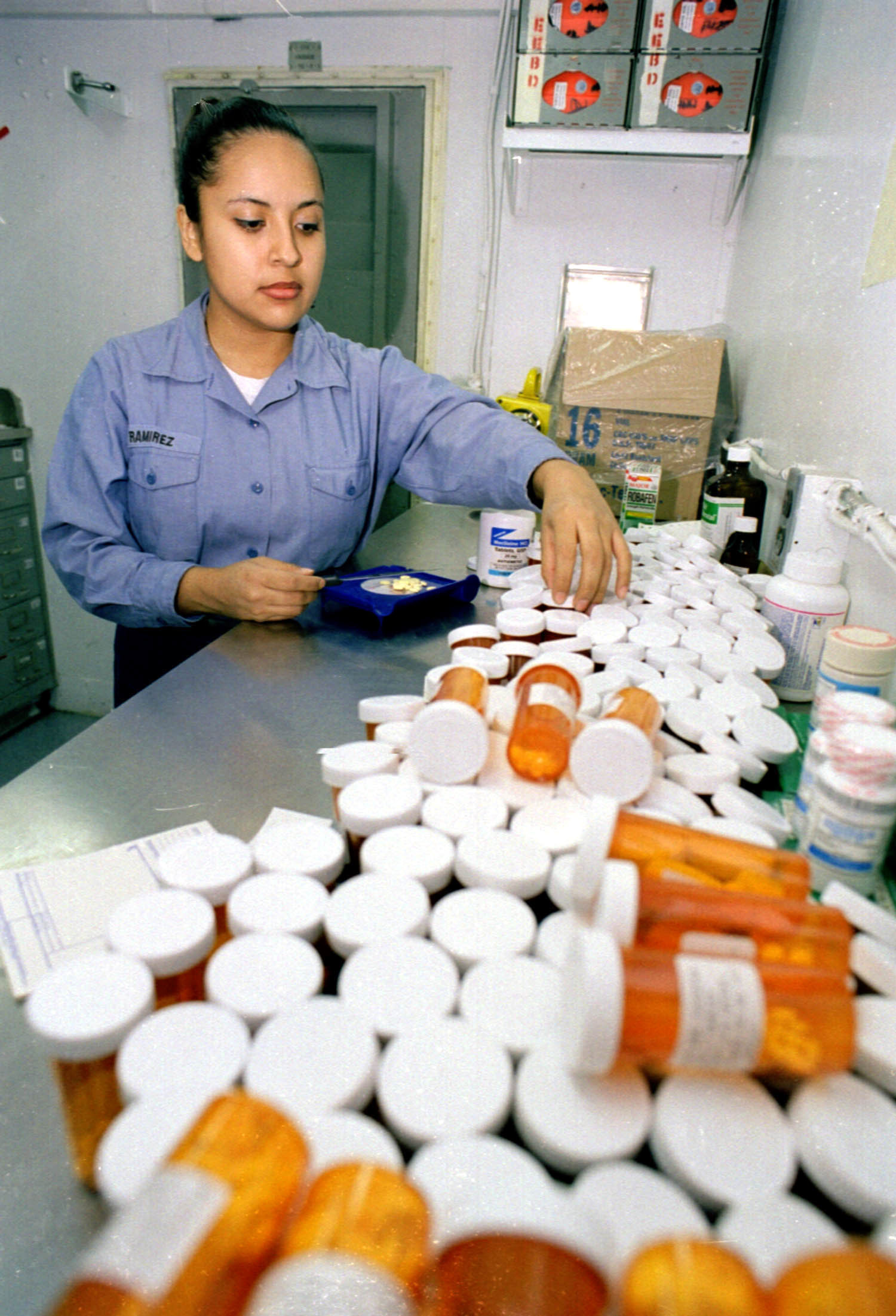
A U.S. Navy corpsman aboard USS Theodore Roosevelt in May 1999

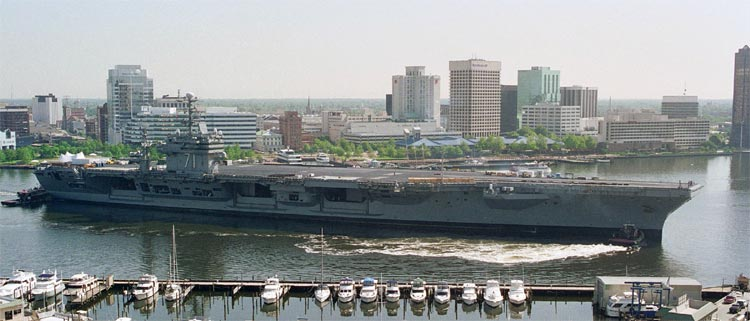
Theodore Roosevelt in the Elizabeth River in 2004

== See also ==
- List of aircraft carriers
- List of aircraft carriers of the United States Navy
- USS Theodore Roosevelt UFO incidents
