= GBU-16 Paveway II =

Type of laser-guided bomb

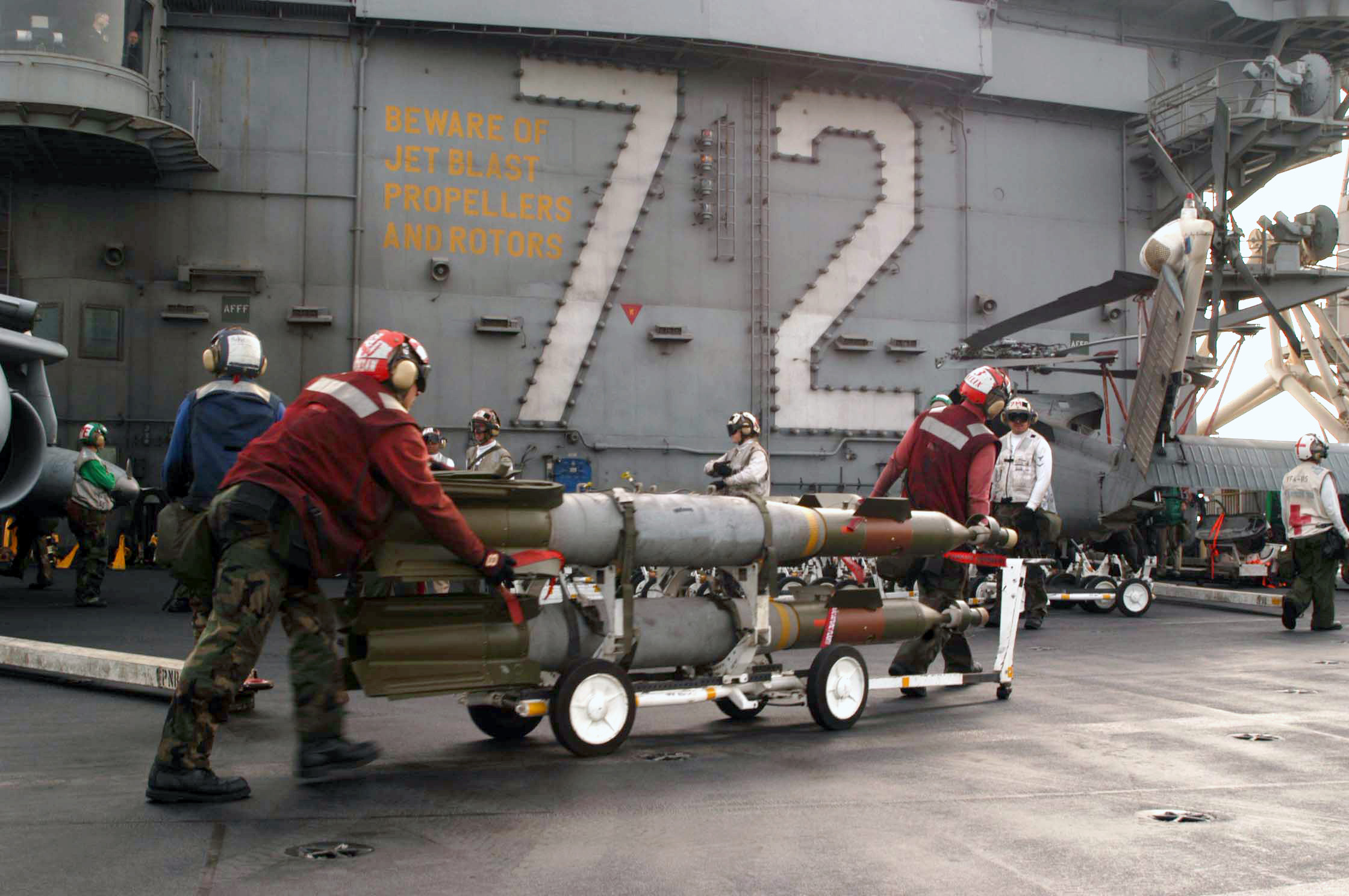
- Armorers loading GBU-16s onto aircraft for transport
- Type: Unpowered laser-guided bomb

Production history
- Manufacturer: Lockheed Martin and Raytheon

Specifications
- Mass: 1,000 lb (450 kg)
- Length: 3.7 metres (12 ft)
- Diameter: 360 millimetres (14 in)
- Maximum firing range: Over 14.8 kilometres (8.0 nmi)
- Filling weight: 202 kilograms (445 lb)

The GBU-16 Paveway II is an American Paveway-series laser-guided bomb, a modified 1,000-pound (450 kg) Mk 83 general-purpose bomb, but with laser seeker and wings for guidance. The GBU-16 was introduced into service around 1976 and is used by the U.S. Air Force, U.S. Navy, U.S. Marine Corps, and various NATO air forces.

GBU-16 bombs are produced by Lockheed Martin and Raytheon. began production after purchasing the product line from Texas Instruments. Lockheed Martin was awarded a contract to compete with Raytheon when there was a break in production caused by transferring manufacturing out of Texas.

Raytheon production of the GBU-16 is centered in Arizona, Texas, and New Mexico. Lockheed Martin's production is centered in Pennsylvania.

Laser-guided bombs are often labeled as "smart bombs" despite requiring external input in the form of laser designation of the intended target. According to Raytheon's fact sheet for the PAVEWAY 2, 99 deliveries of guided munitions will yield a circular error probability (CEP) of only 3.6 feet (1.1 m), versus 310 feet (94 m) for 99 unguided bombs dropped under similar conditions.
