= 125 Squadron =

125 Squadron may refer to:

- No. 125 Squadron RCAF, Canada
- 125 Squadron (Israel)
- No. 125 Helicopter Squadron, IAF, India
- 125 Squadron, Republic of Singapore Air Force
- No. 125 Squadron RAF, United Kingdom
- 125th Air Transport Squadron, United States Air Force
- 125th Fighter Squadron, United States Air Force
- 125th Observation Squadron, United States Air Force
- 125th Special Tactics Squadron, United States Air Force
- VAW-125, United States Navy
- VFA-125, United States Navy
- VA-125 (U.S. Navy), United States Navy
- Second VA-125 (U.S. Navy)
- VPB-125, United States Navy
