= Wilmer P. Cook =

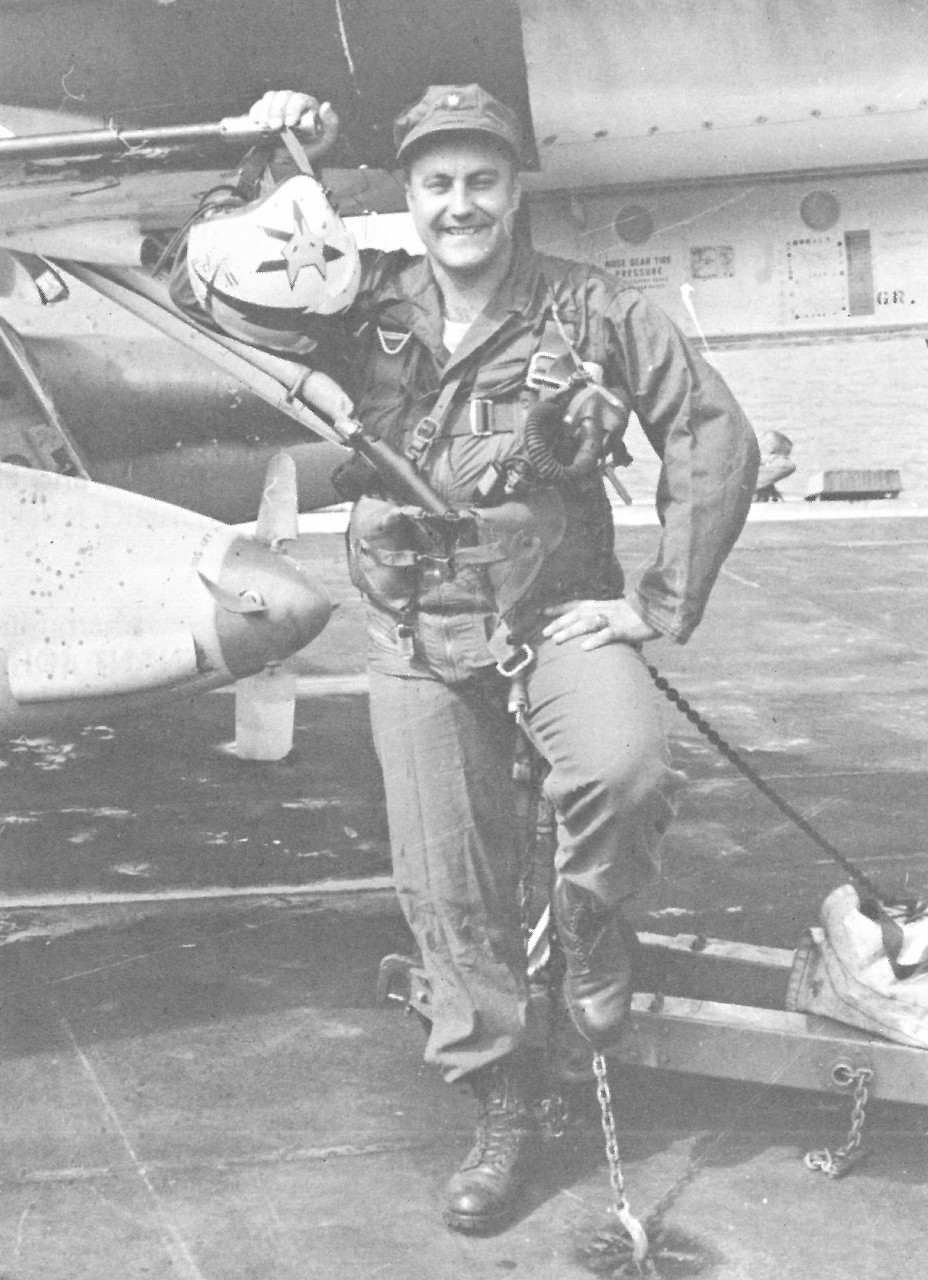
- Lieutenant Commander Wilmer P. Cook poses with his Douglas A-4 Skyhawk
- Born: 1 October 1932; Annapolis, Maryland, U.S.
- Died: 22 December 1967 (aged 35); Hà Tĩnh Province, North Vietnam
- Burial place: Ashes spread into the Pacific Ocean
- Military career
- Allegiance: United States of America
- Branch: United States Navy
- Service years: 1956–1967
- Rank: Lieutenant commander
- Nickname: Cookie
- Units: VA-125; VA-192; VA-216; VA-112; CVW-15; VA-155
- Commands: VA-155
- Conflicts: Vietnam War
- Awards: 4 × Navy Commendation Medal; 3 × Distinguished Flying Cross

Wilmer P. Cook (1 October 1932 – 22 December 1967) was a lieutenant commander in the US Navy, during the Vietnam War.

== Early life ==
Cook was born in Annapolis, Maryland, on 1 October 1932, and received an appointment to the US Naval Academy, in Annapolis, in 1952, following a year at the University of Maryland in College Park. Although his father was employed at the academy, Cook was not immediately accepted into it upon his application. As his brother, John Cook, recalled in an interview conducted on 25 November 1989, "[Wilmer] was a third alternate for acceptance and he knocked on all kinds of doors to get in…. He really wanted to be career Navy." Following his commissioning as an ensign on 1 June 1956, Cook reported for flight training at Naval Air Basic Training Command, Pensacola, and Naval Air Advanced Training, Memphis. He was designated as a naval aviator on 18 October 1957.

== Naval service ==
Upon completion of that period of instruction, Cook returned to the Naval Air Basic Training Command, remaining there until January 1958. He subsequently attended Weapons Systems School at the Naval Air Technical Training Center in Jacksonville, Florida, before joining Attack Squadron (VA) 125, in June 1958, as a Douglas A-4D Skyhawk pilot. He later served as a fleet pilot and weapons officer with VA-216 (February–July 1959) before transferring to VA-192. He also qualified as officer of the deck while in the attack aircraft carrier Bon Homme Richard. Eventually, he transferred to VA-112 to serve as assistant operations officer and material officer.

Cook next served as an aviation science instructor and foreign student liaison officer at the U.S. Naval School, Pre-Flight, Naval Air Station (NAS) Pensacola (1962–65). He subsequently joined VA-125 as a fleet pilot. Owing to his considerable skill and experience with the Skyhawk, he trained fleet replacement pilots and enlisted men in the operation of the A-4. On 1 August, he received a promotion to lieutenant commander. Shortly thereafter, in November 1965, Cook transferred to VA-155, in Carrier Air Wing (CVW) 15.

As a member of VA-155, Cook served Vietnam tours, flying over 300 missions in an A-4E. Starting in November 1965, he and his squadron were embarked onboard the USS Constellation CVA-64. Arriving off the coast of Vietnam on 15 June 1966, the Constellation and CVW-15 were assigned to the Seventh Fleet and tasked with conducting operations against the People's Liberation Armed Forces (PLAF) and other military targets in North Vietnam. On 6 August 1966, Cook led a section of aircraft on a search and destroy mission against enemy torpedo (PT) boats south of Hon Gay Naval Base in North Vietnam. Discovering a heavily-camouflaged Swatow-class PT boat, Cook delivered two 1,000-pound (450 kg) bombs, one of which struck the aft section of the craft and sank it. He and his section subsequently encountered another PT boat that they significantly damaged but did not destroy. For these actions, Cook would posthumously receive his first of seven air medals (Bronze Star in Lieu of the First Award).

Cook earned his first Distinguished Flying Cross just six days later when he led a flight of four A-4Es on a surface-to-air missile (SAM)-suppression mission during an attack on the Thuong Thon, petroleum, oil, and lubricant storage area in the Hà Quảng District. Escorting an attacking force of fourteen strike aircraft, Cook courageously exposed himself to enemy missile fire in order to deliver a point-blank attack against one of the firing sites, disabling its guidance system. He continued to harass other missile sites until the strike force had made a successful egress.

Later that month on 31 August 1966, Cook led a night-time mission to investigate a high-speed surface contact a few miles east of the port of Haiphong. With only flare illumination to guide them, Cook and his section came under heavy fire from an enemy patrol craft. Unable to leave the illumination cone due to the 1,500-foot (460 m) overcast, he and his section made their bomb and rocket runs at minimum altitude and within range of the enemy’s guns. Their attacks sufficiently damaged the enemy vessel to set it aflame, forcing its crew to beach it. The naval aviator and his squadron subsequently destroyed the patrol craft, earning him a posthumous Navy Commendation Medal for "outstanding airmanship and aggressive determination in the face of adverse weather conditions, and while under enemy fire."

On 21 September 1966, Cook successfully led another SAM-suppression mission in support of an air strike on the railroad, storage, and transshipment complex of Thanh Hóa. Once again, he exposed himself to heavy ground fire in order to protect the strike group, harassing the enemy and evading their attacks for over thirty minutes until the strike force had completed its mission and left the target area. Cook would posthumously be awarded his second Air Medal (Gold Star in Lieu of the Second Award) for his actions and "sound leadership."

Cook's leadership skills earned him two more Navy Commendation Medals over the course of two days in October 1966. On 21 October 1966, he led a SAM-suppression mission against the Quang Suoi petroleum storage area and transshipment depot, after which his flight reconnoitered the area south of the target site. Observing multiple ocean-type barges unloading at the mouth of the Thanh Hoa River, Cook unleashed an AGM-12 Bullpup air-to-ground missile attack against the barges. Assessing the damage, Cook recognized that the barges were carrying ammunition, and attacked once more. He then called in three additional strikes, completely destroying the barges. All of this was accomplished while in heavy antiaircraft fire.

Less than a day later, Cook led another mission consisting of two strike craft and two SAM-suppression bombers against the Mai Xá railroad and highway bridge. After successfully destroying the target, Cook rendered assistance to a fighter plane which had been downed during the assault. Directing the rescue helicopter to the scene, Cook led his flight in strafing attacks against multiple North Vietnamese fishing junks attempting to capture the downed pilot, enabling him to be retrieved.

Cook undertook another SAM-suppression mission on 6 November 1966. Leading a flight of two A-4Es, Cook and his wingman were charged with protecting two photo-reconnaissance planes as they flew over the Hải Dương Bridge. Drawing away the radio-controlled antiaircraft fire and missiles from the reconnaissance flights. Cook and his wingman pressed the attack on the enemy launching sites, destroying two of them in the process. All of this was achieved under heavy fire, with one missile even coming within 500 ft (150 m) of Cook's aircraft.

Cook's first Vietnam tour ended with Constellation's return to San Diego, on 3 December 1966. Although he could have requested shore duty to train others to fly the A-4E, Cook volunteered for a second Vietnam tour in 1967. Prior to his departure, he flew back to Annapolis, in May 1967, to see his parents. As his father later recalled in a letter on 18 October 1968, to Rear Admiral Ernest M. Eller, the Director of Naval History, when asked why he wanted to go back, Lt. Cmdr. Cook replied, "I’ll always go where my country sends me and will always do whatever it asks. Perhaps what I am doing may keep my two sons from going to war."

On 20 June 1967, CVW-15 embarked in Coral Sea. Much as he had done during his earlier service in Constellation, Cook distinguished himself during numerous SAM-suppression missions and attacks on PT boats. On 17 September 1967, he participated in an air strike on a railroad/highway bridge in Haiphong, drawing fire from two separate missile sites for nearly 30 minutes while the attacking force complete its mission. He participated in another strike in the same area just a day later, evading two surface-to-air missiles as he executed a perfect dive-bombing run on the bridge approaches. For his actions on both days, he would posthumously receive his fourth and final Navy Commendation Medal (Gold Star in Lieu of the Fourth Medal) and fifth Air Medal (Gold Star in Lieu of the Fifth Award).

Cook achieved another significant milestone on 21 October 1967. While conducting an early morning coastal reconnaissance patrol amidst threatening overcast and reduced visibility, he and his squadron detected six PT boats. Upon sighting the aircraft, the boats raced out from under cover and opened fire, forcing Cook and his wingmen to undertake evasive maneuvers at low altitude. Determined to gain a favorable firing position on the enemy, Cook entered the overcast and made a shallow diving turn, relying solely on his instruments and own sense of timing. With the enemy now back in his sights, he released a bomb right into the center of their formation, sinking four of them and significantly damaging the other two. Having previously sunk one PT boat, Cook earned himself the distinction of being Coral Sea's first "PT-boat ace". He would also be awarded his third Distinguished Flying Cross posthumously.

Cook flew more missions following that, earning himself two more air medals in the process. Following the death of the squadron’s commanding officer, Commander William H. Searfus, Cook became acting CO of VA-155. As his roommate later recounted, when asked if the squadron could handle its duties without its senior officers, Cook replied, "If you can turn this boat [sic] into the wind, you will see Attack Squadron 155 ready to launch aircraft and hit our assigned targets."

=== Death ===
On 22 December 1967, Cook and two other members of VA-155 were ordered to destroy a pontoon bridge on a supply route between Vinh and Hà Tĩnh. As they approached the target, they encountered heavy cloud cover, forcing Cook to drop below 2,500 ft (760 m) to locate the target. The precise details of what occurred at this point are unknown, but when he came back up, his two wingmen reported that his plane was on fire. While no one had seen firsthand what had occurred below the overcast, it is quite likely that the pilot had been struck by either small arms fire or fragments from his own bomb. He tried to reach the coast, but at some point along the way, he ejected from the aircraft. A rescue helicopter was sent to retrieve him, but as it drew within two to three feet (zero point six one to zero point nine one metres) of his prone form, it appeared that Cook had suffered a broken neck and significant trauma to the back of his head, either as a result of the ejection or enemy gunfire. Believing him to be dead and drawing intense fire from nearby North Vietnamese soldiers, the pilots ultimately withdrew before they could land and retrieve his body. "Had there been any hope of life, he would have been picked up," Commander James B. Linder, of CVW-15, wrote mournfully to Cook's widow, Joan. He went to on to emphasize that, "I wish to God we could bring him back but we can't."

Although the rescue team was certain that Cook was deceased, among Cook's surviving family members, questions still lingered about whether he might have survived and been taken prisoner. They would wait nearly twenty years to receive a definitive answer. In the interim, the Navy memorialized Cook by naming escort ship USS Cook in his honor. At the ship's launching ceremony on 23 January 1971, with Cook's family in attendance, Vice Admiral Thomas F. Connolly, Deputy Chief of Naval Operations (Air), spoke eloquently of Cook's accomplishments and read aloud remembrances from some of his shipmates. One of them described their fallen comrade thusly:

The human side of “Cookie” [Cook] is somewhat at odds with our movie version stereotype image of a heroic pilot should be. In appearance, he certainly cut no dashing figure; he was a round, balding man with a black mustache perched on top of his ever-present smile. He didn’t talk like John Wayne - rather his sentences were long, the logic sometimes involved, and he wasn’t afraid to use words of greater than one syllable. He wasn't grim and determined - he always seemed to inject humor and appeared to be taking things lightly.

However, Bill did fulfill some aspects of the stereotyped hero. He greatly enjoyed life. He liked people, conversation and argument - and he was dedicated to his country, his home, and the Navy. I thought the world of "Cookie" - he was one hell of a man.

== Repatriation ==
On 15 December 1988, Vietnam returned the remains of four men as part of a repatriation agreement with the US government. For nine months, forensic specialists at the Army Identification Lab at Hickam Air Force Base, in Hawaii, worked to identify the fallen. Eventually, Cook's remains were positively identified alongside those of USAF Colonel Jerdy A. Wright Jr., Lieutenant Colonel Robert E. Bush, and Major Charles J. Huneycutt, Jr. On 30 September 1989, all four were transported with full military honors from Hickam to Travis Air Force Base, in California.

At the request of Cook's sons, a memorial for their father was held on board frigate Cook on 24 November 1989. As Commander Richard W. Kalb, the ship's CO, noted solemnly, "It's a rare occasion for a ship and her crew to be able to honor the man for whom the ship is named and to commend the remains to the deep." For Cook's sons, the occasion proved even more emotional, with his youngest son, John, noting, "This will be the first time I've been in my father's presence for 22 years." He went on to state, "I don’t know how to react because it's like a new thing, like becoming aware that my father is really here."

Cook's ashes were scattered from Cook's deck into the Pacific on 27 November 1989, bringing to an end a nearly twenty-year ordeal for his family and finally laying the accomplished naval aviator to rest.

== Awards ==
He received the Distinguished Flying Cross, the Air Medal 15th Strike/Flight Award, Navy Commendation Medal with Combat "V" (Three Stars), the Purple Heart, the National Defense Service Medal, the Vietnam Service Medal, and the Republic of Vietnam Ribbon Bar.

== Namesake ==
The Knox-class frigate USS Cook (FF-1083) was named in his honor.

== Bibliography ==
- "Cook II (DE-1083) 1971–1995". Naval History and Heritage Command. 10 April 2018. This article incorporates text from this source, which is in the public domain.
