= VA125 =

VA-125 may refer to:

- VA-125 (U.S. Navy)
- Second VA-125 (U.S. Navy)
- Virginia State Route 125

== See also ==
- VFA-125, U.S. Navy
