= Joint Strike Fighter Wing =

US Navy fighter wing

- Active: 1 October 2018 - Present
- Country: United States
- Branch: United States Navy
- Type: Fighter/Attack
- Role: Type Wing
- Garrison/HQ: NAS Lemoore
- Motto: "Victoria per Furtim" (Latin for "Victory through Stealth")
- Website: https://www.airpac.navy.mil/Organization/Joint-Strike-Fighter-Wing/

Commanders
- Commander: CPT. Barrett "Farva" Smith
- Command Master Chief: CMDCM. Andres R. Rallojay

Aircraft flown
- Fighter: F-35C Lightning II

Joint Strike Fighter Wing (JSFW) (a.k.a. COMJSFWING or JSFWING) is the U.S. Navy's Fifth-generation fighter squadron wing. It oversees 4 squadrons that all fly the F-35C Lightning II. The wing, based at Naval Air Station Lemoore in California, is also home to the West Coast F-35C Fleet Replacement Squadron (FRS) VFA-125, which is the only F-35C FRS in the US Navy. It trains U.S. Navy and U.S. Marine Corps pilots in the F-35C before they are assigned to operational fleet squadrons.

== History ==
The Joint Strike Fighter Wing was established on 1 October 2018 at NAS Lemoore under Commander, Joint Strike Fighter Wing, to oversee training and mission readiness of all F-35C squadrons as the US Navy increased its inventory of that aircraft. It was established around the same time that VFA-125 and VFA-147 were transitioned to the F-35C Lightning II. The mission statement of JSFW is to resource and deliver combat-ready JSF squadrons to Carrier Air Wing Commanders to conduct carrier and shore-based Strike Warfare missions as directed by Theater and Fleet Commanders.

== Mission ==
When it was first established in 2018, the initial objective of JSFW was to get VFA-147 ready for operational testing and for its upcoming Initial Operational Capability (IOC) declaration. The unit passed all testing and achieved IOC on 28 February 2019. JSFWING's current broad mission is to provide the US Navy Carrier Air Wings (CVWs) with combat-ready Fifth-generation fighter squadrons. Currently, the only aircraft the US Navy flies that classifies as a 5th generation fighter is the F-35C Lightning II. The wing trains the pilots in its squadrons for Electronic attack and Strike fighter missions. JSFW is in charge of operating F-35C Fleet Replacement Squadrons. The only F-35C FRS is currently VFA-125 based at NAS Lemoore. JSFW has also been tasked with meeting Naval Aviation Enterprise requirements to qualify its aircraft as Ready for Tasking (RFT). RFT is similar to the classification of Full Mission Capable (FMC) but is less demanding and only requires that a fraction of all aircraft in the command can perform a given mission at a time. For example, a F/A-18E/F Super Hornet on a precision strike mission could be designated as RFT even if it would not be able to perform aerial refueling, another of its missions, on the same flight.

== Assigned units ==
Joint Strike Fighter Wing exercises command over 4 operational squadrons and 1 fleet replacement squadron (VFA-125). The squadrons in the following list are organized chronologically from top to bottom based on when they transitioned to the F-35C Lightning II. The year they transitioned is listed in parentheses.

- VFA-125 "Rough Raiders" (2017)
- VFA-147 "Argonauts" (2018)
- VFA-97 "Warhawks" (2021)
- VFA-86 "Sidewinders" (2023)
- VFA-115 "Eagles" (2024)

== See also ==
- Naval aviation
- List of US Naval aircraft
- List of United States Navy aircraft wings
- List of United States Navy aircraft squadrons
- Modern US Navy carrier air operations
