= AN/AAS-38 =

Military airborne infrared laser designator pod

AN/AAS-38 Nite Hawk
- Forward-looking infrared laser designator
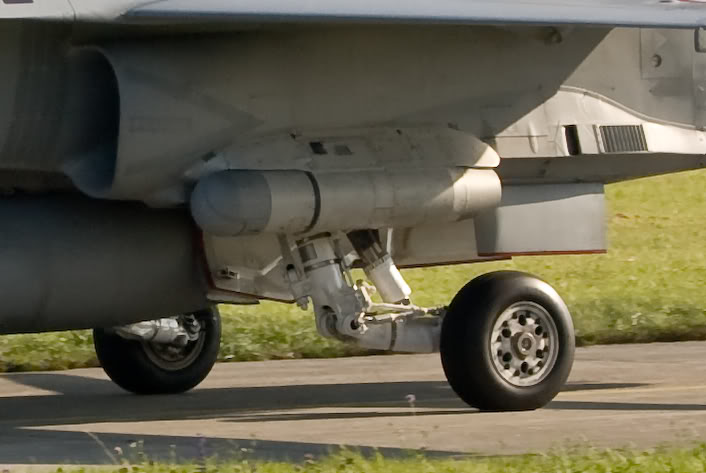
- AN/AAS-38A mounted on F/A-18C Hornet aircraft
- Status: In use

Manufacturing Info
- Manufacturer(s): Hughes Aircraft, Loral Corp, now Lockheed Martin
- Introduced: 1984
- Production period: 1984 – 2001 (17 years)
- No. produced: >450

Specifications
- Width: 12 in (0.3 m)
- Length: 5 ft 11 in (1.8 m)
- Diameter: 13 in (33 cm)
- Weight: 340.3 lb (154.36 kg)

Usage
- Used by country: See § Users
- Used by military: See § Users
- Platform(s): F/A-18 Hornet; F-14D Tomcat; SH-60B Seahawk
- Variants: AN/AAS-38A; AN/AAS-38B; AN/AAS-38(SC)

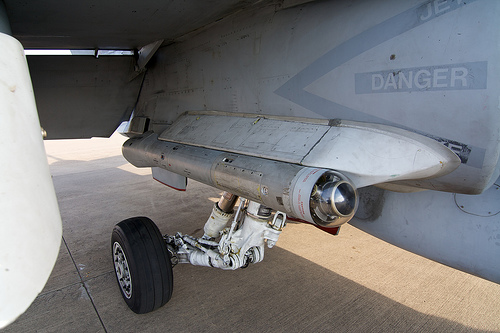
AN/ASQ-173 Laser Detector Tracker Strike Camera (LDT/SCAM) pod mounted on F/A-18C Hornet Weapon Station 6

The Lockheed Martin AN/AAS-38 Nite Hawk is a high-resolution FLIR, laser designator, and laser tracker pod system for use with laser-guided munitions. The US Navy used the AAS-38 on the F/A-18C/D Hornet and F-14D Tomcat in combination with the AN/AAS-50 navigation FLIR pod for laser-guided munitions delivery.

The system provides real-time target data allowing the pilot to locate, identify, track and engage targets. It allows the aircraft to perform high-speed low-altitude interdiction and close air support missions at night in visibility conditions reduced by smoke, dust, smog or haze. In combination with the AAS-50 and a pair of night vision goggles, the Nite Hawk provides the capability to maintain situational awareness, navigate and avoid terrain, acquire and designate targets, and assess battle damage after deployment of munitions.

== History ==
The AAS-38 was initially developed specifically for the F/A-18 Hornet. It was designed to provide the attack aircraft with day/night and adverse weather capabilities. The system can locate and acquire a target, automatically tracking it and feeding precise target data to the aircraft mission computer. It also provides a video display to the pilot of the aircraft. The system is capable of maintaining the area of interest centered on the display while the aircraft maneuvers.

Although full-scale development began in 1978, and the first procurement funding was provided in 1982, the first production deliveries of the AAS-38 in 1984. Initial flight tests were completed using T-39 Sabreliner aircraft in 1981. Until 1990, Loral was the primary producer of the AAS-38. But in 1990, Hughes Aircraft was awarded a US$44,500,000 contract to become a second-source component supplier. After flight testing of the Hughes systems, Hughes became a second source for the pods and spares. In 1996, Loral was acquired by Lockheed Martin.

During a 1998 Persian Gulf convoy protection mission, the AAS-38 was mounted to SH-60B Seahawk LAMPS Mk III equipped helicopters. Flight tests of the AAS-38 Nite Hawk (SC) variant have also been performed on F-15 Eagle, F-16 Fighting Falcon and AV-8B Harrier II aircraft. During the Bosnian War, F/A-18 aircraft equipped with the AAS-38 performed well in bombing missions in Operation Deliberate Force, highly praised by squadron commanders.

The AN/ASQ-228 Advanced Targeting Forward Looking Infrared (ATFLIR) system produced by Raytheon was expected to replace the AAS-38 in the F/A-18 due to ATFLIR's superior targeting range.

== Variants ==
- AN/AAS-38 was a non-laser designator, FLIR only system.
- AN/AAS-38A was a laser Target Designator/Ranger (LTD/R). This pod was mounted on the lower left (port) side of the F/A-18.
- AN/AAS-38B added laser Spot Tracking capability and air-to-air Infrared Search and Track, eliminating the need for an AN/ASQ-173 pod.
- AN/AAS-38 NITE Hawk (SC) added a self cooling (SC) component providing a more generic interface and expanding the systems application to other aircraft.

== Technical description ==
In accordance with the Joint Electronics Type Designation System (JETDS), the "AN/AAS-38" designation represents the 38th design of an Army-Navy airborne electronic device for infrared detection/search, range and bearing equipment. The JETDS system also now is used to name all Department of Defense electronic systems.

The AAS-38A and AAS-38B pods have a diameter of approximately 33 cm (13 in) and 182.88 cm (6.000 ft) length. Each of the versions have different weights with the AAS-38 weighing in at 154.36 kg (340.3 lb), AAS-38A weighing 172.52 kg (380.3 lb), AAS-38B at 167.98 kg (370.3 lb) and the NITE Hawk (SC) weighing 195 kg (430 lb). The system consists of 12 weapon replaceable assemblies (WRAs) and makes extensive use of digital technology for optics control, target auto-tracking, avionics communication and built-in test (BIT) functions.

The forward section of the pod contains an optics stabilizer and laser transceiver. The combination of stabilizer and transceiver provide look angles between 30° up and 150° below horizontal with a tracking rate of 75° per second. The aft section contains the temperature-conditioned FLIR receiver detecting infrared energy and converting it to visible format. That format is then presented to the pilot on an 875-line cathode ray tube (CRT) display in the cockpit. Besides the FLIR receiver, the aft section also contains a roll drive motor, temperature control assembly, controller-processor, roll drive power amplifier, high-speed digital servo control for the optics stabilizer, laser power supply and a power supply for the pod. The FLIR has the ability to update the navigation system when the aircraft flies over a known location.

=== Specifications ===
- Spectral sensitivity: 8—12 μm within −32 °C (−26 °F) to 89 °C (192 °F)
- Thermal sensitivity: < 0.1 °F (−17.7 °C)
- Image field: 3° x 3° or 12° x 12°
- Field of regard: +30° to -165° pitch, and 540° roll
- Resolution: 875 lines

== Users ==
- Royal Australian Air Force
- Royal Canadian Air Force
- Kuwait Air Force
- Royal Malaysian Air Force
- Spanish Air and Space Force
- Swiss Air Force
- United States
  - United States Navy
  - United States Marine Corps

== See also ==
- List of military electronics of the United States
