= VFA-125 =

United States Navy aviation squadron

Strike Fighter Squadron 125
- Active: 13 November 1980 – 1 October 2010 and 12 January 2017 – present
- Country: United States
- Branch: United States Navy
- Type: Fighter/Attack
- Role: Introduce the F-35C to the fleet, train replacement personnel to fly and maintain the aircraft
- Part of: Joint Strike Fighter Wing
- Garrison/HQ: NAS Lemoore
- Nickname: "Rough Raiders"
- Mascot: "Chuckie"
- Decorations: CNO Aviation Safety Award

Commanders
- Commanding Officer: CDR Christopher A. Case
- Executive Officer: CDR Michael Procelli
- Command Master Chief: CMDCM Ioana L. Wolfinger

Aircraft flown
- Fighter: F/A-18C Hornet; F-35C Lightning II

Strike Fighter Squadron 125 (VFA-125), also known as the "Rough Raiders", is a United States Navy strike fighter squadron based at Naval Air Station Lemoore, California. The "Rough Raiders" are a Fleet Replacement Squadron flying the F-35C Lightning II. Their radio callsign is Raider.

The unit's patch is seen worn by Jay Ellis in Top Gun: Maverick.

== History ==
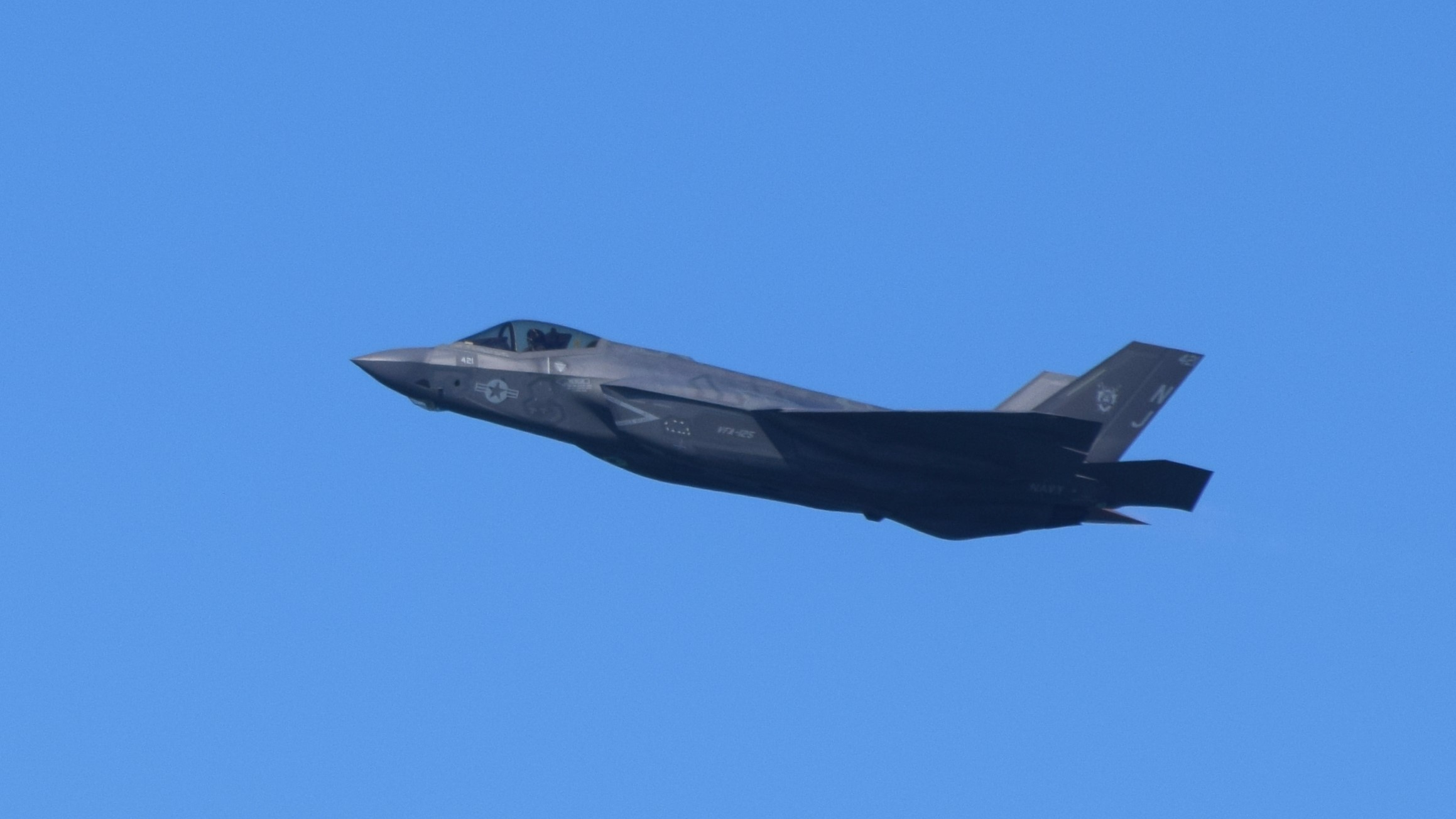
A VFA-125 F-35C Lightning II flying over San Francisco Bay during Fleet Week SF 2022

There have been three distinct squadrons known as the Rough Raiders. The first VA-125 was established in 1946 as Naval Reserve Squadron VA-923. It was activated for service in the Korean War on 20 July 1950, redesignated VA-125 in February 1953 and was disestablished on 10 April 1958. The second VA-125 was established on 30 June 1956 as VA-26 and redesignated VA-125 Rough Raiders on 11 April 1958, one day after the first VA-125 disestablished. That second VA-125 was disestablished on 1 October 1977.

The VFA-125 "Rough Raiders" were established on 13 November 1980 at NAS Lemoore, California, becoming the Navy's first F/A-18 squadron. Often, a new squadron will assume the nickname, insignia, and traditions of earlier squadrons, but officially, the US Navy does not recognize a direct lineage with disestablished squadrons if a new squadron is formed with the same designation. VFA-125 received its first aircraft in April 1981, and by March 1985, had amassed over 30,000 mishap-free flight hours in the Hornet.

On 1 October 2010, VFA-125 was deactivated as an F/A-18 Fleet Replacement Squadron, and its aircraft and personnel were incorporated into VFA-122. The squadron was re-activated at NAS Lemoore on 12 January 2017 as the West Coast F-35C Lightning II FRS.

== Mission ==
The "Rough Raiders" trained F/A-18 pilots for the U.S. Navy, pilots and naval flight officers for the U.S. Marine Corps, and pilots and weapon systems officers for various NATO and Allied nations. Flight training was supplemented by the latest state-of-the-art computer flight simulators and computer-based academic instruction to enhance understanding and performance in the Hornet. In addition, the squadron routinely conducted strike and fighter detachments to NAS Key West, Florida; NAF El Centro, California; and NAS Fallon, Nevada, as well as aboard aircraft carriers in both the Pacific and Atlantic Oceans.

Every 6 weeks, a class of between 8 and 12 newly winged USN and USMC naval aviators began the 9-month training course in which they learned the basics of air-to-air and air-to-ground missions, culminating in day and night carrier qualification and subsequent assignment to fleet Hornet squadrons. More senior USN and USMC officers attended shorter training courses on their way to assignments in leadership roles in squadrons and higher-echelon organizations.

VFA-125 averaged 1,500 flight hours monthly and trained approximately 120 pilots each year. Pilots from the U.S. Navy, the U.S. Marine Corps, the Royal Air Force, the Canadian Forces (now Royal Canadian Air Force), the Spanish Air Force, the Royal Australian Air Force, the Hellenic Air Force, the Kuwait Air Force, and the Finnish Air Force were trained at VFA-125. By May 1996, VFA-125 had amassed over 70,000 mishap-free flight hours in the Hornet, and was recognized for this milestone with the CNO Aviation Safety Award. By January 1998, it was the first fleet readiness squadron to surpass 100,000 mishap-free flight hours.

VFA-125 was also responsible for transitioning experienced naval aviators from other aircraft, such as the A-6 Intruder, F-14 Tomcat, and S-3 Viking, to the Hornet as those earlier aircraft were retired from operational squadrons. Aircrew returning from non-flying assignments also underwent refresher training at VFA-125 prior to returning to flying assignments. Additionally, VFA-125 (with the help from the Center of Naval Aviation Technical Training Unit, CNATTTU) trained maintenance personnel and provided replacement aircraft to operational units. VFA-125's East Coast counterpart was VFA-106, initially at NAS Cecil Field until late 1999, and then at NAS Oceana. Additionally, VMFAT-101 at MCAS El Toro and later at MCAS Miramar also trained Navy and Marine Corps Hornet operators.

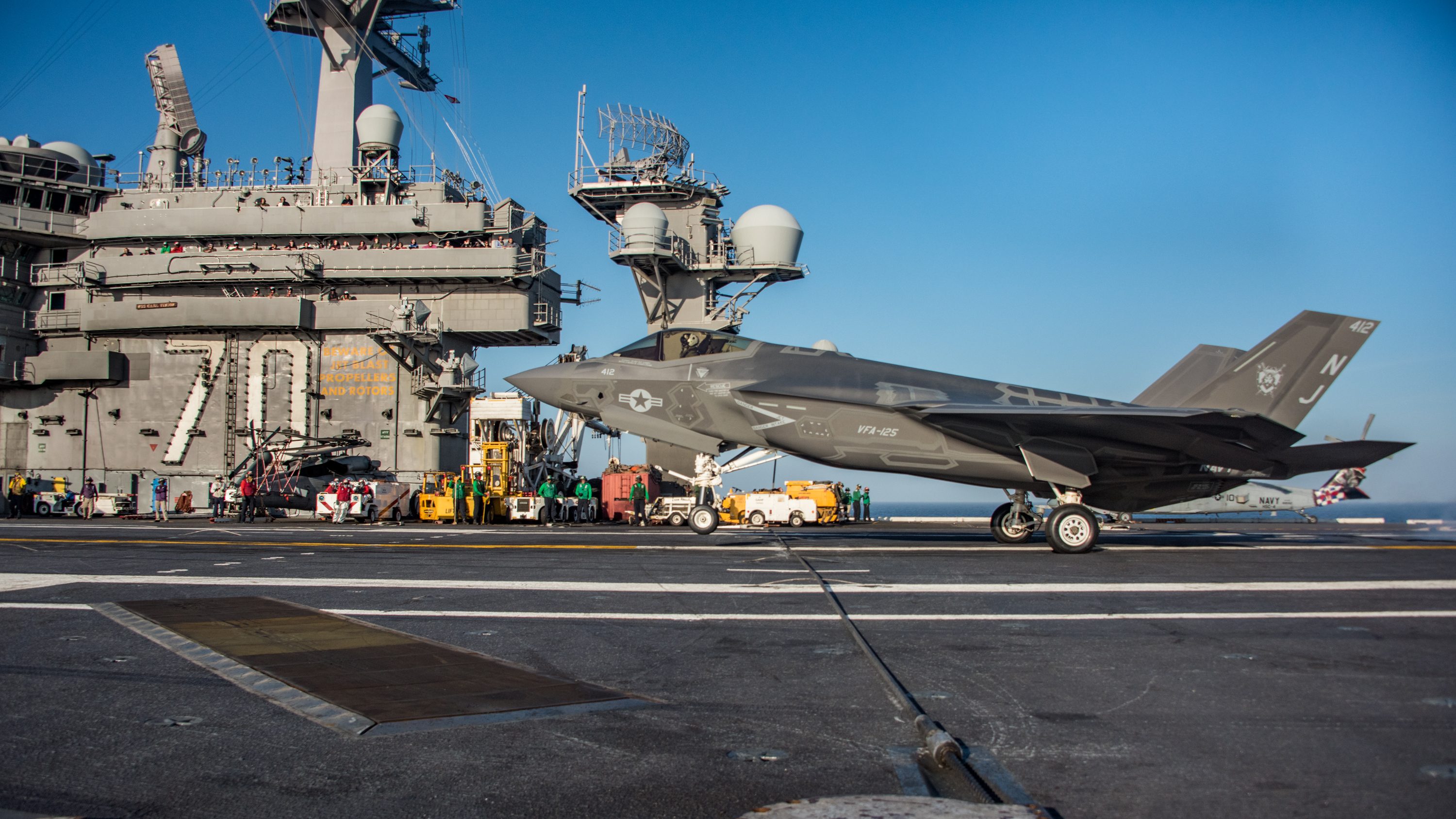
A VFA-125 F-35C lands on USS Carl Vinson on 18 October 2017.

On 1 October 2010, VFA-125 was deactivated and its aircraft and personnel were merged into VFA-122. The merger was intended to cut administrative costs and streamline training in anticipation of the replacement of the F/A-18A+, F/A-18C, and F/A-18D Hornet by the F/A-18E/F Super Hornet and F-35 Lightning II in the coming years. The merged squadron continued operations as the VFA-122 Flying Eagles while the use of the VFA-125 Rough Raiders name was suspended until January 2017.

The squadron was re-activated at NAS Lemoore on 12 January 2017 as the West Coast F-35C Lightning II FRS. It received its first 4 aircraft on 25 January 2017. The aircraft were transferred from VFA-101 which was then deactivated. VFA-101 had been the F-35C FRS since May 2012.

== See also ==
- Naval aviation
- Modern US Navy carrier air operations
- United States Naval Aviator
- United States Marine Corps Aviation
- List of United States Navy aircraft squadrons
- List of Inactive United States Navy aircraft squadrons
