= USS Cook (FF-1083) =

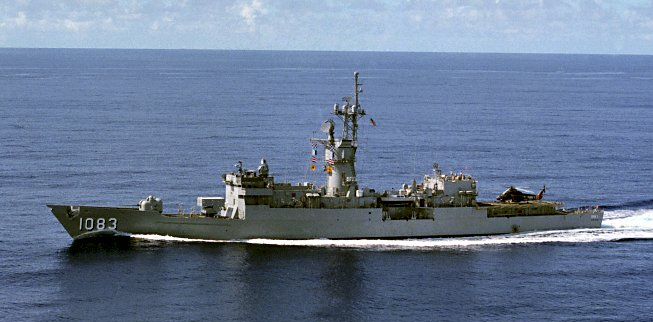
- USS Cook (FF-1083)

History

United States
- Name: Cook
- Namesake: Wilmer P. Cook
- Ordered: 25 August 1966
- Builder: Avondale Shipyard, Bridge City, Louisiana
- Laid down: 20 March 1970
- Launched: 23 January 1971
- Acquired: 9 December 1971
- Commissioned: 18 December 1971
- Decommissioned: 30 April 1992
- Stricken: 11 January 1995
- Home port: San Diego
- Identification: Hull symbol:FF-1083; Code letters:NACI
- Motto: Above All Duty
- Fate: Disposed of through the Security Assistance Program (SAP), transferred to Taiwan, 29 September 1999, retired in 2015 and sunk as target in 2020.

General characteristics
- Class & type: Knox-class frigate
- Displacement: 3,201 tons (4,182 full load)
- Length: 438 ft (134 m)
- Beam: 46 ft 9 in (14.25 m)
- Draft: 24 ft 9 in (7.54 m)
- Propulsion: two CE 1,200 psi (8,300 kPa) boilers; one Westinghouse geared turbine; one shaft, 35,000 shp (26,000 kW)
- Speed: over 27 knots (50 km/h; 31 mph)
- Complement: 18 officers, 267 enlisted
- Sensors & processing systems: AN/SPS-40 Air Search Radar; AN/SPS-67 Surface Search Radar; AN/SQS-26 Sonar; AN/SQR-18 Towed array sonar; AN/SQS-35 Independent variable depth sonar; (IVDS; Fish); AN/SPG-53 Gun Fire-control radar; Mk-68 Gun Fire Control System
- Electronic warfare & decoys: AN/SLQ-32 Electronics Warfare System
- Armament: one Mk-16 8-cell missile launcher for RUR-5 ASROC and Harpoon missiles; one Mk-42 5-inch/54 caliber gun; Mk-46 Torpedoes from four single tube launchers; one Mk-25 BPDMS launcher for Sea Sparrow missiles (later removed)
- Aircraft carried: one SH-2 Seasprite (LAMPS I) helicopter

USS Cook (FF-1083) was a Knox-class frigate built for the United States Navy by Avondale Shipyard, Bridge City, Louisiana.

The ship was named after Lieutenant Commander Wilmer P. Cook, USN, a Douglas A-4E Skyhawk aviator from Attack Squadron 155 aboard Coral Sea. On 22 December 1967, LCdr. Cook launched on a combat mission over North Vietnam. LCdr. Cook was killed when he ejected from his burning aircraft, a rescue helicopter was unable to recover his body when it came under heavy fire.

== Design and description ==
The Knox-class design was derived from the Brooke-class frigate modified to extend range and without a long-range missile system. The ships had an overall length of 438 feet (133.5 m), a beam of 47 feet (14.3 m) and a draft of 25 feet (7.6 m). They displaced 4,066 long tons (4,131 t) at full load. Their crew consisted of 13 officers and 211 enlisted men.

The ships were equipped with one Westinghouse geared steam turbine that drove the single propeller shaft. The turbine was designed to produce 35,000 shaft horsepower (26,000 kW), using steam provided by 2 C-E boilers, to reach the designed speed of 27 knots (50 km/h; 31 mph). The Knox class had a range of 4,500 nautical miles (8,300 km; 5,200 mi) at a speed of 20 knots (37 km/h; 23 mph).

The Knox-class ships were armed with a 5"/54 caliber Mark 42 gun forward and a single 3-inch/50-caliber gun aft. They mounted the 5-inch (127 mm) gun on the bridge. Close-range anti-submarine defense was provided by two twin 12.75-inch (324 mm) Mk 32 torpedo tubes. The ships were equipped with a torpedo-carrying DASH drone helicopter; its telescoping hangar and landing pad were positioned amidships aft of the mack. Beginning in the 1970s, the DASH was replaced by a SH-2 Seasprite LAMPS I helicopter and the hangar and landing deck were accordingly enlarged. Most ships also had the 3-inch (76 mm) gun replaced by an eight-cell BPDMS missile launcher in the early 1970s.

== Construction and career ==
USS Cook was sponsored by Mrs. Joan C. Nelson, widow of the late LCDR Wilmer P. Cook. Her keel was laid 20 March 1970, launched on 23 January 1971, and delivered 9 December 1971. Cook was commissioned on 18 December 1971.

On her shakedown cruise in the Caribbean in March 1972, she responded to a distress signal from the Barao de Maua, a 5,000-ton Brazilian cargo ship that had suffered an explosion in the cargo hold and was on fire. She arrived on scene to render aid to survivors. Her shakedown cruise also included a voyage around South America though the Strait of Magellan rather than through the Panama Canal prior to her arrival at the Long Beach Naval Shipyard, completing her shakedown availability. The city of Cypress, California officially adopted Cook during their annual Cypress Spring Festival on May 20, 1972.

The ship's first deployment was to Vietnam where she was assigned to escort USS Constellation (CV-64) operating at Yankee Station, then to Task Force 78 as part of Operation End Sweep, providing an anti-air picket to protect the minesweeping vessels operating in the area.

On her second WestPac tour in 1975, Cook would be assigned to Task Force 76, participating in Operation Eagle Pull and Operation Frequent Wind, responsible for the evacuation of allied forces from Cambodia and Vietnam. While the number of U.S. citizens and Cambodian allies was limited and entirely dependent on U.S. assets to evacuate, the sheer number of South Vietnamese aircraft in theater meant that in addition to the official flights being conducted by the U.S. Navy and Marine Corps pilots to designated carriers and amphibious ships tasked with receiving them, hundreds of RVN Army and Air Force aircraft followed the U.S. forces out to the waiting Task Force. Cook and the other escort ships tasked with security of the task force were initially instructed to prevent unauthorized aircraft from landing, however several captains recognized that the receiving ships could not handle the volume and allowed those aircraft to land on their small helicopter decks and accepting the evacuees onto their ships as well.

LCDR Raymond W. Addicott, Cook's executive officer, recounted in the documentary "The Lucky Few" that the image on the radar scope “looked a swarm of bees...I went topside on the bridge and the sky was just full of helicopters.” With limited space on their flight deck intended for the use of their single on board LAMPS helicopter, the escort ships began pushing the additional helicopters over the side after disembarking its passengers. Throughout the Task Force, some 45 UH-1 Hueys and at least one CH-47 Chinook were pushed overboard to make room for more helicopters to land.

In addition to the humanitarian efforts on that day by the Task Force, Cook's mission was not yet completed. 35 Republic of Vietnam Navy (RVNN) captains in command of former U.S. Navy and Coast Guard ships loaned to South Vietnam had refused to surrender their ships to Vietnam People's Navy, and had made arrangements with DAO liaison officer Richard Armitage to turn their ships over to the U.S. at Con Son Island, approximately 150 miles (241.4 km) south of Saigon. Cook and her sister ship, USS Kirk, were tasked to rescue the RVNN officers and crew, and scuttle the ships, so they wouldn't fall into enemy hands. What Armitage knew, but failed to share, knowing it would never be approved was that the crews wouldn't leave their families behind, and as word spread, by the time the RVNN ships departed Saigon, some 30,000 friends and family had crowded on the ships or followed the fleet out on some 50 other cargo, fishing, and private recreational boats. The Cook and Kirk's captains knew the only option was to take the ships with them to U.S. Naval Base Subic Bay, 1,000 miles (1,600 km) away, and did what they could to help prepare vessels for the voyage, moving passengers from barely floating boats onto bigger vessels and scuttling the rest. The flotilla formed a five-mile (8.1 km) long convoy travelling the speed of the slowest boat, 5 knots. From there, most of the refugees ultimately emigrated to the United States.

After Vietnam, Cook would go be deployed on countless tours to the Indian Ocean and the Persian Gulf, assigned to patrol Gonzo Station, the Strait of Hormuz, and participating in Operation Earnest Will.

One unique honor Cook has is that the remains of her namesake, LCDR Wilmer P. Cook, would be found and repatriated during her service life. At the request of Wilmer's sons, a memorial was held aboard and his ashes scattered in the Pacific from Cook's deck in November 1989.

Cook would be decommissioned on 30 April 1992, struck 11 January 1995, and disposed of through the Security Assistance Program (SAP) to be transferred to Taiwan on 29 September 1999. She served the Republic of China Navy (ROCN) as Hai-Yang (FFG-936) with additional re-modifications and retired May 2015. Hai-Yang used as the target during exercises in 2020. She was sunk by an F-16V on 1 July 2020.

== Sources ==
- Friedman, Norman (1982). U.S. Destroyers: An Illustrated Design History. Annapolis, Maryland: Naval Institute Press. ISBN 0-87021-733-X.
- Gardiner, Robert; Chumbley, Stephen & Budzbon, Przemysław (1995). Conway's All the World's Fighting Ships 1947-1995. Annapolis, Maryland: Naval Institute Press. ISBN 1-55750-132-7.
- Waldman, Martin R. (23 January 2018). "Cook II (DE-1083)". Naval History and Heritage Command. Dictionary of American Naval Fighting Ships. United States Navy.
