= VA-122 (U.S. Navy) =

Attack Squadron 122
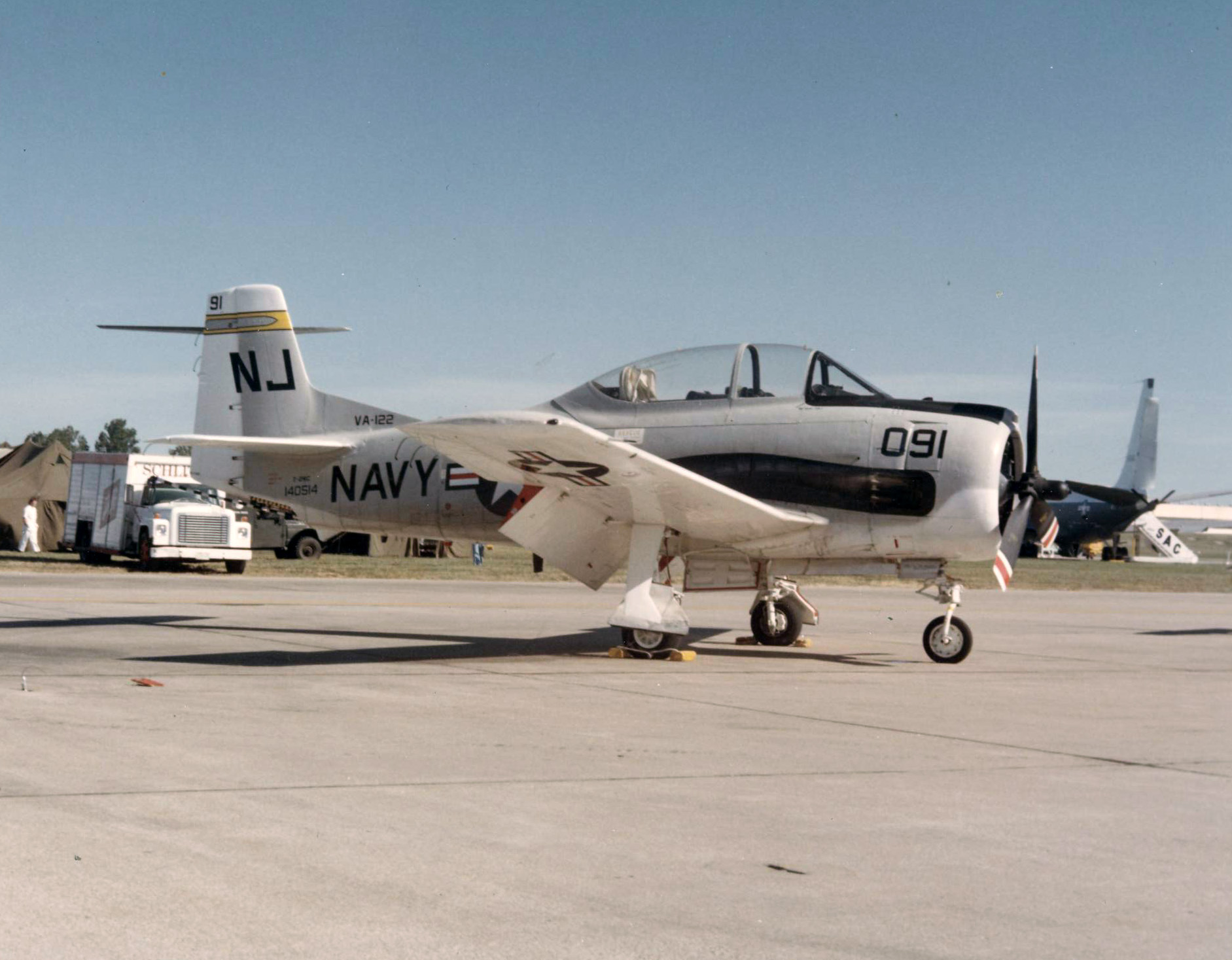
- VA-122 T-28C Trojan at Offutt Air Force Base, 1976
- Active: 25 May 1950 - 31 May 1991
- Country: United States
- Branch: United States Navy
- Type: Attack
- Nickname(s): Flying Eagles
- Engagements: Korean War

Aircraft flown
- Attack: AD Skyraider; TBM Avenger; A-7 Corsair II; T-39D Sabreliner; T28C Trojan

VA-122 was a long-lived Attack Squadron of the U.S. Navy. It was established as Composite Squadron VC-35 on 25 May 1950, redesignated Attack Squadron (All Weather) VA(AW)-35 on 1 July 1956, and finally as VA-122 on 29 June 1959. The squadron was disestablished on 31 May 1991, after 41 years of service, primarily as a training squadron. Its nickname was the Flying Eagles from 1971–1991.

== Operational history ==
- May 1950: The squadron was established with a mission of all-weather attack and anti-submarine warfare (ASW). The squadron trained detachments for carrier deployments and also participated in various exercises held on the West Coast.
- 9 November 1950 – 9 June 1951: VC-35 Detachment 3 was the squadron’s first detachment to deploy. It deployed to Korea and flew ASW patrols, night heckler missions, and other combat sorties. These became the standard missions for the squadron detachments that deployed to Korea.
- 29 June 1959: The squadron’s mission was changed from all-weather attack to fleet replacement training. It was responsible for instrument flight training for fleet propeller pilots, including ground school; enlisted ground training for AD Skyraider maintenance personnel; and the training of fleet replacement pilots for the AD-6/7 Skyraider.
- June–August 1960: The squadron trained eight officers from the Republic of Vietnam Air Force in the operation of the AD Skyraider.
- November 1966: With the acceptance of the A-7A Corsair II, the squadron took on the additional mission of fleet replacement training in this new aircraft.
- 1967: VA-147 was the first squadron to be trained in the A-7 by VA-122.
- December 1969: The squadron joined with VA-125 to inaugurate a graduate level Light Attack Weapons School which involved three intensive weeks of classroom and flight syllabus training covering all phases of attack aviation.
- 15 October 1973: VA-122’s Weapons Training Center, which conducted the Light Attack Weapons School, became a separate command and was designated Light Attack Weapons School, Pacific.
- 30 June 1988: With the disestablishment of VA-174, the east coast Fleet Readiness Squadron for the A-7, VA-122 assumed the responsibility for A-7 training on both coasts.
- May 1991: Prior to VA-122’s disestablishment, it had trained and graduated over 5,000 light attack pilots and over 55,000 highly skilled maintenance personnel during its career as a fleet replacement training squadron.

== Home port assignments ==
The squadron was assigned to these home ports, effective on the dates shown:

- NAS San Diego/North Island – 25 May 1950*
- NAS Moffett Field – 01 Jul 1961
- NAS Lemoore – 01 Jan 1963

* NAS San Diego was redesignated NAS North Island in 1955.

== Aircraft assignment ==
The squadron first received the following aircraft on the dates shown:

- AD-4N Skyraider – Jun 1950
- AD-3Q Skyraider – Jun 1950
- AD-4Q Skyraider – Jul 1950
- AD-2Q Skyraider – Jul 1950
- AD-3 Skyraider – Jul 1950
- TBM-3E/N Avenger – Jul 1950
- AD-Q Skyraider – Aug 1950
- AD-3N Skyraider – Dec 1950
- AD-4NL Skyraider – Aug 1951
- AD-4N Skyraider – Jan 1952
- AD-4B Skyraider – Feb 1952
- F3D-2 Skynight – Feb 1953
- AD-5N Skyraider – Mar 1954
- AD-5 Skyraider – May 1954
- AD-6/AD-1H Skyraider – May 1954
- S2F-1 Tracker – Oct 1956
- TF-1Q Trader – 18 Jan 1957
- AD-5Q Skyraider – 20 Nov 1957
- AD-7/A1J Skyraider – 05 Dec 1958
- T28-B Trojan – 01 Mar 1959
- A-7A Corsair II – 15 Nov 1966
- A-7B Corsair II – May 1968
- A-7E Corsair II – 14 Jul 1969
- A-7C Corsair II – Jul 1971
- T-39D Sabreliner – 1971
- T28C Trojan – 1973
- TA-7C Corsair II – 1978

== See also ==
- List of squadrons in the Dictionary of American Naval Aviation Squadrons
- History of the United States Navy
- List of inactive United States Navy aircraft squadrons
