= VA-112 (U.S. Navy) =

Attack Squadron 112
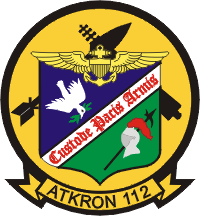
- VA-112 squadron patch
- Active: 9 April 1945 – 10 October 1969
- Country: United States
- Branch: United States Navy
- Role: Attack aircraft
- Part of: Inactive
- Nickname(s): Broncos
- Engagements: Korean War; Vietnam War

Aircraft flown
- Attack: F6F Hellcat; F8F Bearcat; F9 Panther; F9 Cougar; F3H Demon; A-4 Skyhawk

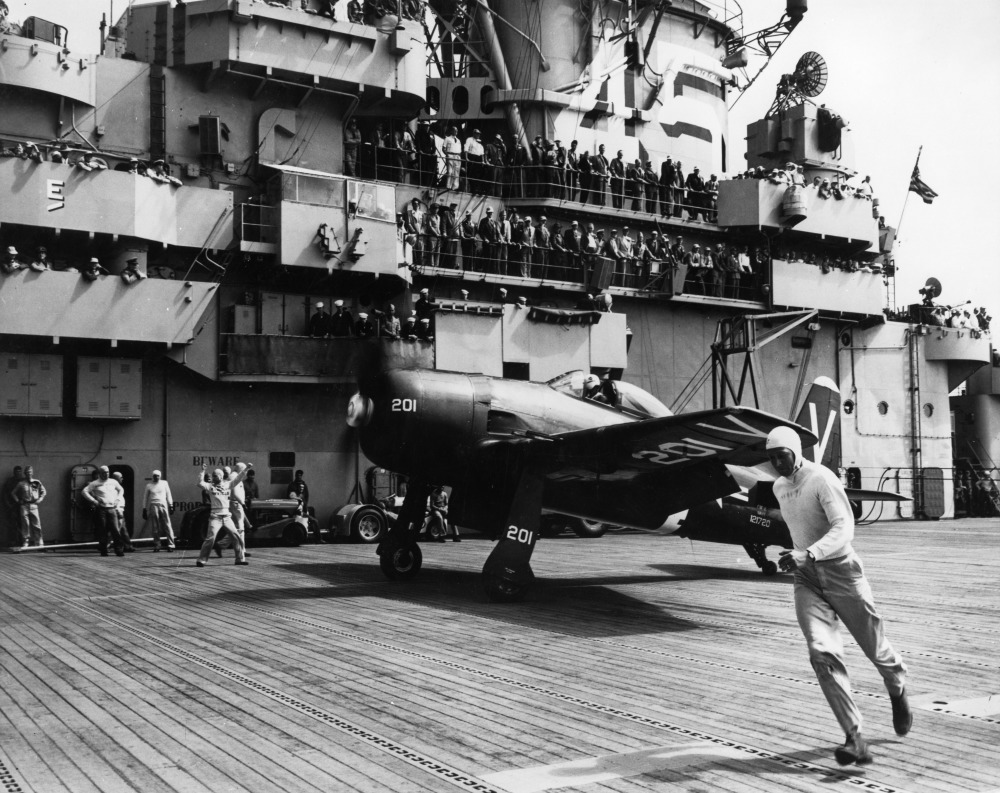
VF-112 F8F-2 prepares to launch from USS Valley Forge in 1949

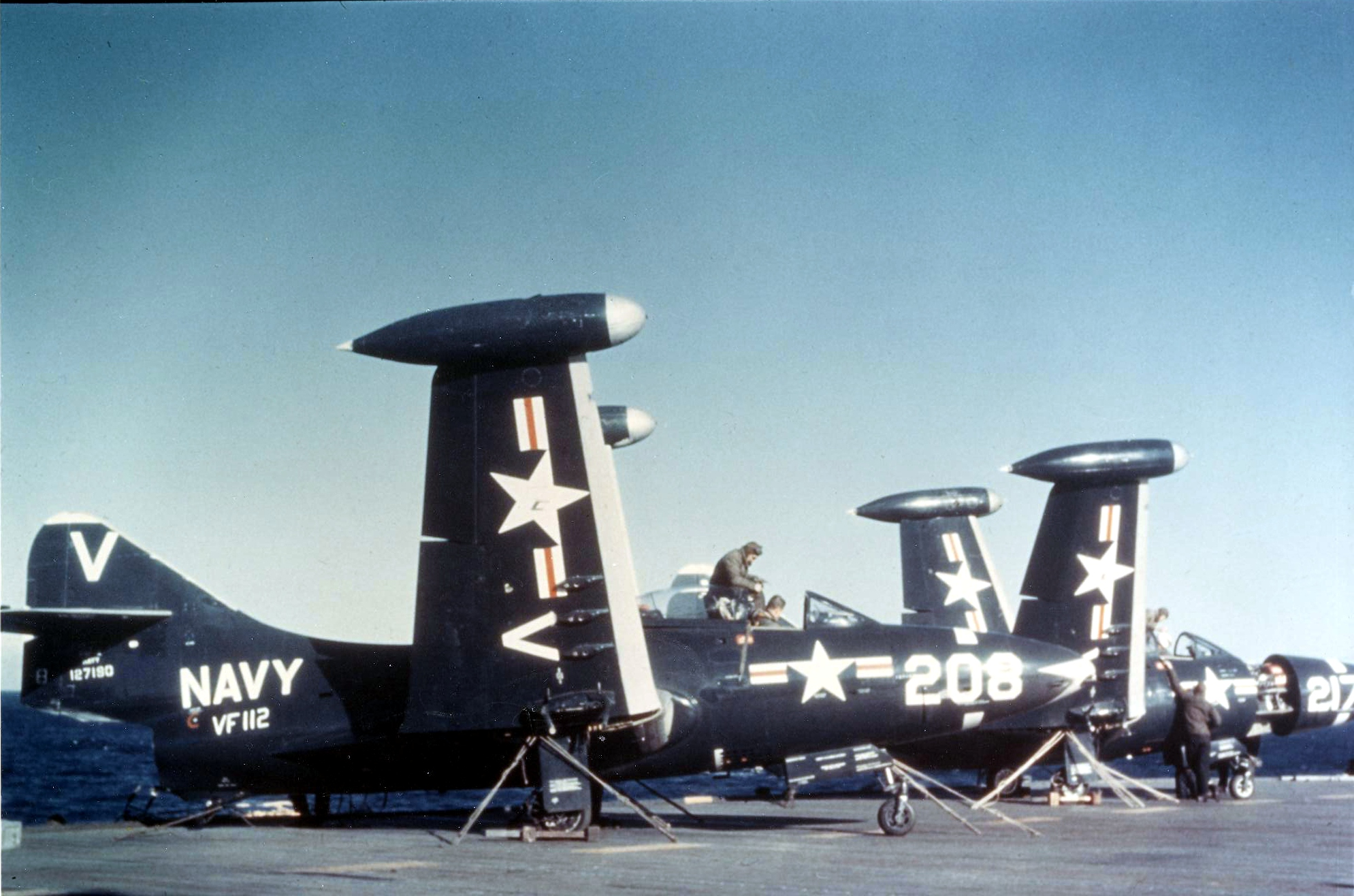
VF-112 F9F-2Bs on USS Philippine Sea c.1950

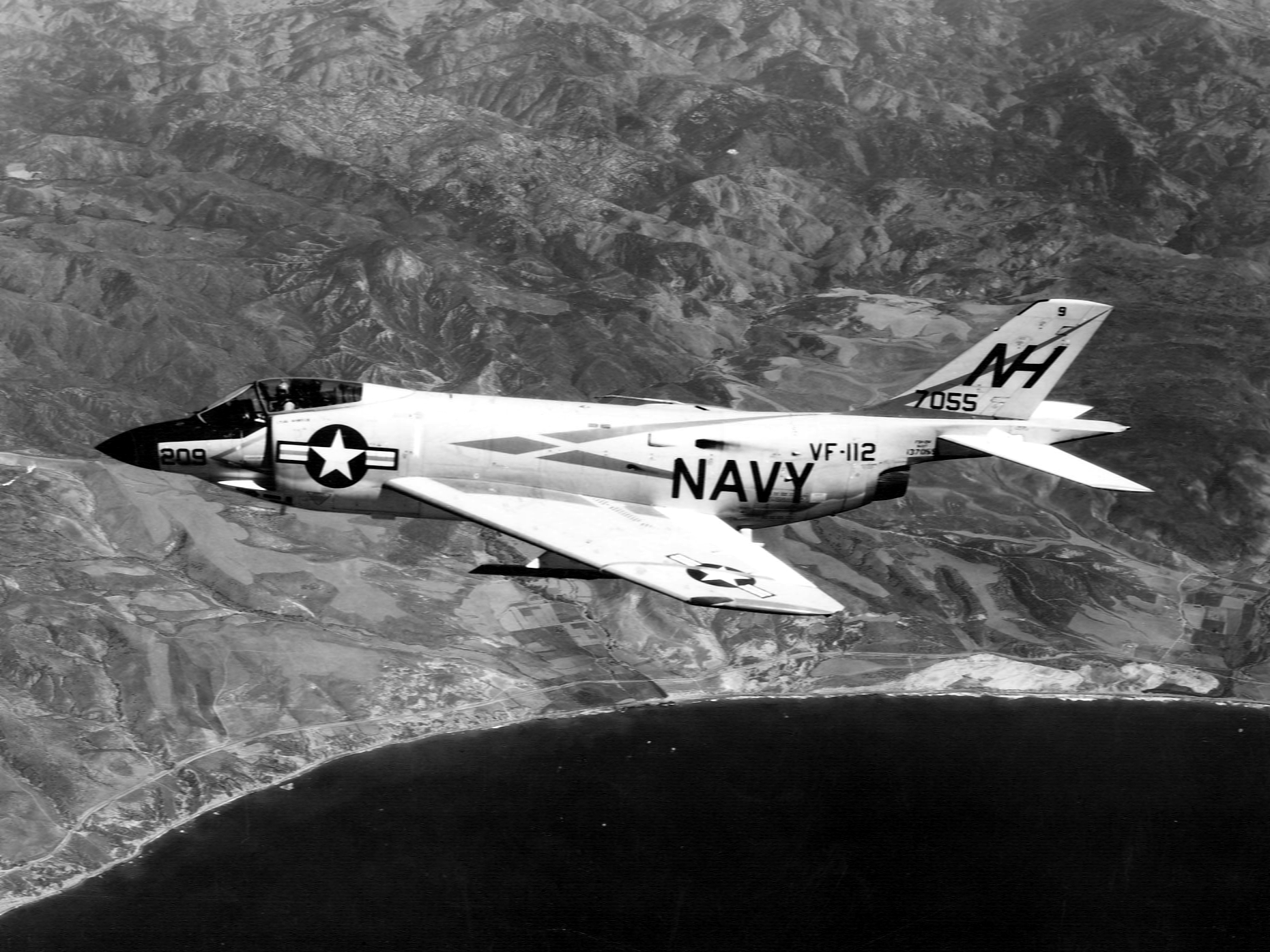
VF-112 F3H-2 in 1957

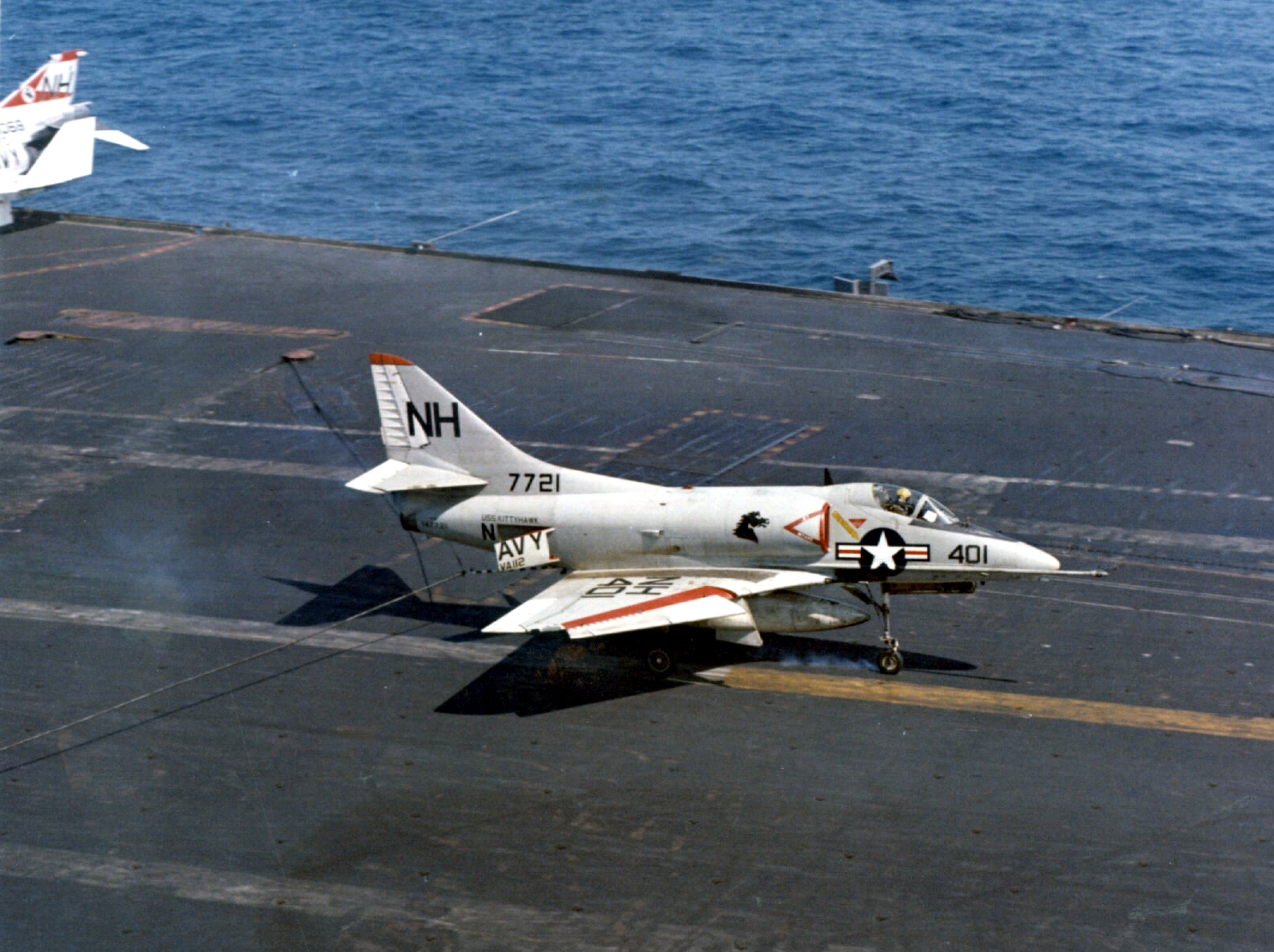
VA-112 A-4C landing aboard USS Kitty Hawk off Vietnam in 1968.

VA-112 was an Attack Squadron of the United States Navy. It was established as Bomber-Fighter Squadron VBF-11 on 9 April 1945, redesignated Fighter Squadron VF-12A on 15 November 1946, then as VF-112 on 15 July 1948. It was finally redesignated as VA-112 on 15 February 1959. The squadron was disestablished on 10 October 1969. Its nickname from 1961 to 1969 was the Broncos.

== Operational history ==
- 25 Mar 1948: USS Valley Forge operated in the Persian Gulf with Saudi Arabian Prince Ibn Saud embarked to view air operations. However, the air display was cancelled because of a sand storm and hazy conditions.
- 29 Apr 1948: Valley Forge moored port side to Dokkeskjaerkaien Dock, Bergen, Norway. The mooring was conducted without the aid of tugs, using the engine power of the squadron's eight F8Fs spotted on the forward deck and eight other aircraft on the aft deck. The mooring operation was called Operation Pinwheel.
- 5 Aug 1950: The squadron participated in its first combat operations, flying sorties against targets in the Mokpo-Kwangju area of South Korea.
- 12–19 Sep 1950: The squadron participated in the pre-assault strikes against targets in and around Inchon, Korea, in preparation for the Inchon landing on 15 September. These strikes included road, rail, and airfield sweeps and Combat Air Patrol. During and after the invasion the squadron continued to fly daily air sweeps, striking at targets of opportunity and the enemy's lines of communications.
- 10 Nov 1950: The squadron's first encounter with MiG-15s occurred during a sortie over Sinuiju, North Korea. One MiG-15 was damaged during the engagement.
- 23–24 June 1952: The squadron participated in coordinated strikes against North Korean hydroelectric power plants, the first heavy attack conducted against these installations. Nine different hydroelectric power plants were struck by forces from Carrier Air Groups 2, 7, 11, 19, and the 5th Air Force.
- 6–13 Feb 1955: The squadron was on station and available for air support during the evacuation of over 26,000 personnel from the Tachen Islands during the First Taiwan Straits Crisis.
- 24 Apr 1967: Squadron aircraft participated in a multi-carrier coordinated strike against North Vietnam's Kép Air Base, northeast of Hanoi. This was the first time a strike had been conducted against a North Vietnam MiG airfield.
- 10 May 1967: Commander M. L. Minnis Sr., was awarded the Silver Star for action during a strike into North Vietnam against the thermal power plant at Haiphong.
- Apr 1969: Following the shoot down of a Navy EC-121 aircraft by the North Koreans, USS Ticonderoga, with VA-112 aboard, along with two other attack carriers, was ordered to the Sea of Japan

== Home port assignments ==
The squadron was assigned to these home ports, effective on the dates shown:

- NAS Alameda – 9 Apr 1945
- NAAS Fallon – 30 Apr 1945
- NAAS Santa Rosa – 31 Jul 1945
- NAS Kahului – 21 Feb 1946
- NAS San Diego – 25 Nov 1946
- NAAS Miramar/NAS Miramar – 7 Apr 1951
- NAS Lemoore – 11 Sep 1961

== Aircraft assignment ==
The squadron first received the following aircraft on the dates shown:

- F6F-3/5 Hellcat – Apr 1945
- F8F-1 Bearcat – 11 Dec 1946
- F8F-2 Bearcat – 3 Jan 1949
- F9F-2 Panther – 11 Jan 1950
- F9F-2B Panther* – Jul 1950
- F9F-3 Panther – 31 May 1951
- F9F-2B Panther – 12 Jul 1951
- F9F-5 Panther – Oct 1952
- F9F-6 Cougar – Feb 1954
- F9F-8 Cougar – Jul 1955
- F9F-8B Cougar – Apr 1956
- F3H-2M Demon – 5 Apr 1957
- A4D-1/2 Skyhawk – Apr 1959
- A4D-2N/A4C Skyhawk – 26 Mar 1961

* The squadron's F9F-2s were modified at NAS Barbers Point and equipped with rocket launchers and bomb racks and designated F9F-2Bs.

== See also ==
- List of squadrons in the Dictionary of American Naval Aviation Squadrons
- Attack aircraft
- List of inactive United States Navy aircraft squadrons
- History of the United States Navy
