= 125 Squadron (Israel) =

Israeli military unit

93rd Squadron IAF
- טייסת 125
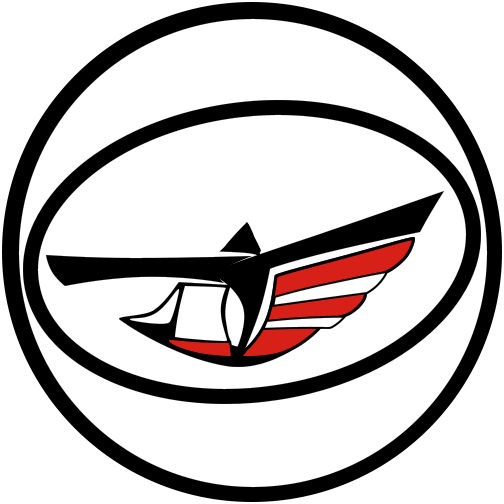
- Logo of the Squadron
- Country: Israel
- Allegiance: Israel Defense Forces
- Branch: Israeli Air Force
- Type: Helicopter squadron
- Role: Multipurpose
- Garrison/HQ: Sde Dov Airport
- Nickname: Light Squadron

Aircraft flown
- Helicopter: Bell 206B

The 125 Squadron of the Israeli Air Force, also known as the Light Helicopters Squadron, was a Bell 206B helicopter squadron based at Sde Dov Airport.

== History ==
The squadron was established in 1967 as a helicopter squadron. Upon its establishment, he served in the Alouette II helicopter squadron. In the early 70s of the 20th century, the Air Force purchased Bell 206 helicopters, which were given the name "Saifan". These helicopters were purchased from the Italian company Augusta, which received the knowledge from Bell, the manufacturer of the helicopter. This model is a civilian model. In the Air Force, the helicopter was called Seifen A. Later in the 1970s, the Air Force purchased Saipan B, which is actually a Bell OH-58 Kioah military helicopter. After that, Jet Ranger helicopters were purchased that served in the premises of the flight school. These helicopters were called "Saifan C" and during an emergency they were attached to squadron 125, for the purpose of increasing the number of helicopters of the squadron.

With the purchase of the Heron helicopter (civilian version of the UH-1 ) from the Bell company, a Heron branch was opened in the squadron, which was intended for AHAM transport missions.

In 1984, the Air Force purchased the "Saifanit" which is the same helicopter, but in a longer version of the BELL-206L model.

Throughout the years of its activity, the squadron took part in the Yom Kippur War, the Galilee Peace War and ongoing security missions. Among its missions were the transportation of commanders, observation and intelligence gathering, the landing of light forces and Tsafuk missions.

The squadron was closed in 2003 .

== Sources ==
- "לא קלה דרכנו", "Our Way isn't easy" at Israeli Air Force website
