= Laser tracker =

Instruments that accurately measure large objects

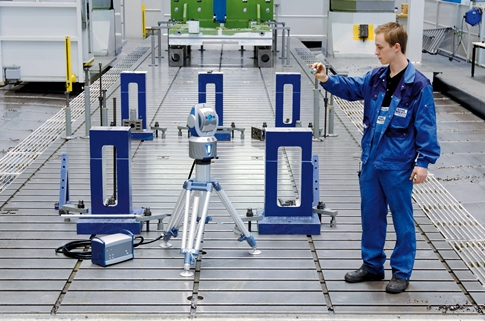
A photo of the FARO Laser Tracker Vantage

Laser trackers are instruments that accurately measure large objects by determining the positions of optical targets held against those objects. The accuracy of laser trackers is of the order of 0.025 mm over a distance of several metres. Some examples of laser tracker applications are to align aircraft wings during assembly and to align large machine tools. To take measurements the technician first sets up a laser tracker on a tripod with an unobstructed view of the object to be measured. The technician removes a target from the base of the laser tracker and carries it to the object to be measured, moving smoothly to allow the laser tracker to follow the movement of the target. The technician places the target against the object and triggers measurements to be taken at selected points, sometimes by a remote control device. Measurements can be imported into different types of software to plot the points or to calculate deviation from the correct position.

The targets are known as "retroreflective" because they reflect the laser beam back in the same direction it came from (in this case, back to the laser tracker). One type of target in common use is called a spherically mounted retroreflector (SMR), which resembles a ball bearing with mirrored surfaces cut into it.

== History ==
The first laser tracker was invented in 1987 by Dr. Kam Lau, CEO of API (Automated Precision, Inc.) while at NIST and made commercially available by API Metrology in 1988 with its first production unit being made available to Boeing under a 9-month lease agreement. Tennessee Technology University received an API 6-D laser tracker in 1989. Instruments were later produced by Kern in 1991 following a technology agreement with API. Currently, there are three well known manufacturers of Laser Trackers; FARO, API, and Leica.

== References and sources ==
- Bob Bridges. “How Laser Trackers Work.” Quality Digest, June 25, 2009.
- James R. Koelsch, “Should Laser Trackers be in your Arsenal of Metrological Tools?” Quality Magazine, March 2012.
- “Portable laser tracker measures large volumes accurately.” Machine Design, August 25, 2011, Vol. 83 Issue 14, p19.
- Joel Martin. “Laser tracking fundamentals.” Quality Magazine, May 2007.
- Javier Vera. “The Versatile Laser Tracker.” Quality Digest. January 27, 2011.
- National Institute of Standards and Technology. "." "NIST Public Affairs Office", June 4, 2010.
