= VFA-115 =

Strike Fighter Squadron 115
- Active: 10 October 1942 - present
- Country: United States
- Branch: United States Navy
- Type: Fighter/Attack
- Role: Close air support Air interdiction Aerial reconnaissance
- Part of: Carrier Air Wing Seventeen
- Garrison/HQ: NAS Lemoore
- Nicknames: Little Butch; Eagles; Arabs
- Motto: "EFR - Win!" (with EFR meaning "Eagles Forever Rule")
- Engagements: World War II; Korean War; Vietnam War; Operation Desert Shield/Storm; Operation Southern Watch; Third Taiwan Strait Crisis; Operation Desert Fox; Operation Enduring Freedom; Iraq War

Commanders
- Commanding Officer: CDR Nicholas "Thunder Buddy" Lowe
- Command Master Chief: CMDCM. Frederick "Mike" Tyler

Aircraft flown
- Attack: TBF Avenger; AD/A-1 Skyraider; A-6 Intruder
- Fighter: F/A-18C Hornet; F/A-18E Super Hornet; F-35C Lightning II

Strike Fighter Squadron 115 (VFA-115) is a United States Navy F-35C Lightning II strike fighter squadron stationed at Naval Air Station Lemoore. Its tail code is "NA" and its radio call sign is "Talon". It was established as Torpedo Squadron VT-11 on 10 October 1942, redesignated VA-12A on 15 November 1946, VA-115 on 15 July 1948, then finally VFA-115.

== Squadron insignia and nickname ==
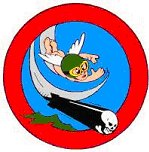
The original patch for Torpedo Squadron Eleven designed by Walt Disney

The squadron’s first insignia was designed by Walt Disney and consisted of a black torpedo with the skull & crossbones on it and a winged cherub wearing a green helmet nicknamed "Little Butch." A new squadron insignia was approved on 17 September 1956 and is still in use. The squadron was known as the "Arabs" from the 1950s to 1979, at which time they were renamed the "Eagles". During the squadron’s deployment to the Indian Ocean in 1989, they temporarily changed their nickname back to Arabs to enhance the morale while operating in the Arabian Sea.

== History ==
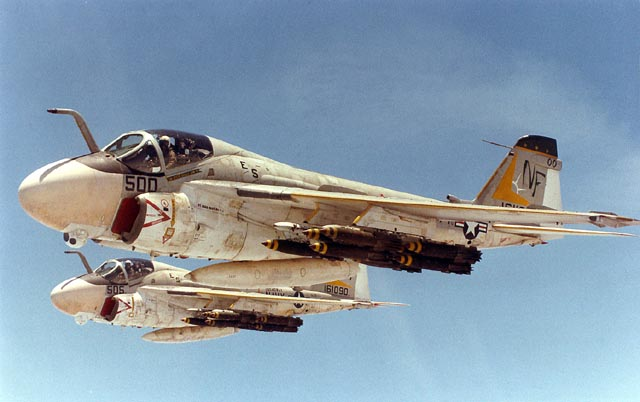
Two A-6E TRAM Intruders of the VA-115 Eagles, sometime between 1980 and 1982. The squadron was deployed aboard USS Midway during that time.

=== 1940s ===
Torpedo Squadron Eleven (VT-11) was established at Naval Air Station San Diego on 10 October 1942, flying TBF Avengers. Over the next five years, the squadron upgraded through several models of TBF and TBM Avengers.

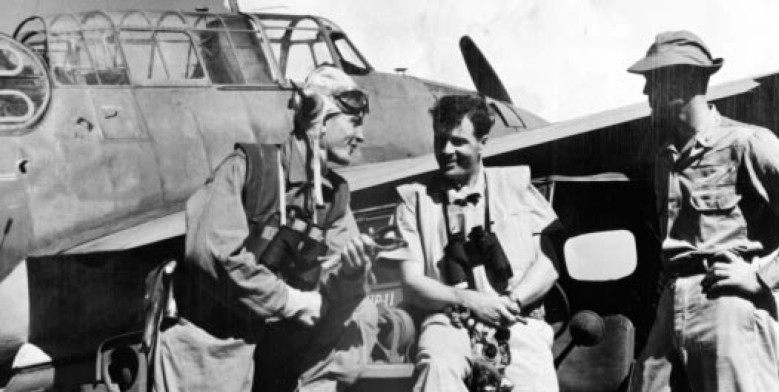
Members of VT-11 at Guadalcanal in May 1943

On 25 April 1943, VT-11 arrived at Guadalcanal. The squadron's first combat was flown from Henderson Field as part of Carrier Air Group Eleven (CVG-11). The squadron was land-based at Guadalcanal, and in June 1943, VT-11 pilots conducted the first daylight raids on Bougainville and the Solomon Islands. They flew patrol, search, spotting, strike, and night mine-laying missions.

From 29 September 1944 to 1 February 1945, VT-11 was deployed aboard USS Hornet. The squadron participated in the first strikes against Okinawa and two weeks later converged on Leyte Gulf to protect the landing and supply ships engaged in the Battle of Leyte. On 25 October, the Japanese Fleet converged on Leyte to oppose the landings. Squadron TBMs were launched from 550 km (342 mi) away (well beyond normal range) to strike the fleet. The TBMs struck the retiring Japanese ships, scoring hits on a battleship and two cruisers. All the squadron's aircraft returned, completing a 1,000 km (621 mi) round trip. Seven Navy Crosses were awarded to VT-11 aircrews during this campaign.

In November and December 1944, the squadron continued to provide support for the occupation of Leyte, striking targets on Luzon in support of the landings on Mindoro. In January 1945, the squadron struck ships and targets on Formosa and Luzon in support of the Invasion of Lingayen Gulf, Luzon. The squadron participated in operations in the South China Sea (the first time an American Task Force had entered these waters since the beginning of the war), striking targets at Cam Ranh Bay and a convoy off Qui Nhơn, French Indo-China, shipping at the Pescadores Island, and Hong Kong.

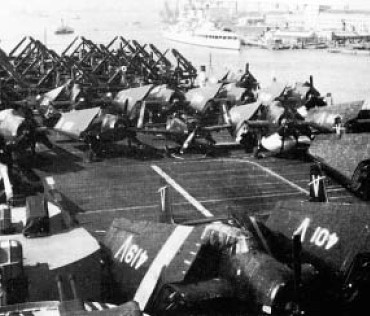
VA-12A TBM-3s on USS Valley Forge during the 1947/48 world cruise.

An exhibit honoring VT-11 during World War II is on board the USS Hornet Museum in Alameda, California.

After the war, Naval Air Station San Diego became VT-11's new homeport, and the squadron was redesignated as Attack Squadron 12A (VA-12A) in November 1946. VA-12A, along with Carrier Air Group (CVAG-11), underwent extensive training and embarked on USS Valley Forge, the U.S. Navy's newest aircraft carrier. In June 1948, VA-12A deployed on a world cruise, a first for a U.S. Navy air group and milestone for the squadron. A symbolic globe later became part of the squadron's official insignia to commemorate the cruise.

On 15 July 1948, VA-12A was re-designated Attack Squadron 115 (VA-115), and in December, the squadron transitioned to the AD Skyraider, operating several improved models over the next ten years.

==== Timeline ====
- 1 Jan–1 Feb 1943: A detachment of 6 aircraft from the squadron were sent to Kanton Island, in the Phoenix Islands, for antisubmarine defense and search missions.
- Apr–Jul 1943: The squadron was landbased at Guadalcanal and participated in the Solomons (New Georgia) Campaign. They flew patrol, search, spotting, strike, and night minelaying missions against targets in the Solomon Islands.
- 5 May 1944: Squadron aircraft were involved in an antisubmarine attack off the coast of Hilo, Hawaii. The attack against the enemy submarine was assessed as probable by the squadron commander.
- 10 Oct 1944: The squadron participated in the first strikes against Okinawa, part of the opening of the Leyte Campaign.
- 25 Oct 1944: The Japanese Fleet, in three elements, converged on Leyte to oppose the landings. While 340 miles from Leyte, which was beyond the normal combat radius for World War II carrier aircraft, squadron aircraft were launched for a strike on the central element of the Japanese Fleet. Its TBMs arrived over the enemy fleet after it had broken off its engagement, the Battle Off Samar, with the American escort carriers and destroyers guarding the landing and supply ships. The TBMs struck the retiring Japanese Central Fleet, scoring hits on a battleship and two cruisers. All the squadron’s aircraft returned, completing a 600-mile round trip combat flight. For their actions during this engagement, the following squadron personnel were awarded the Navy Cross: Lieutenants Wilbur J. Engman, Melvin L. Tegge, and Thomas B. Adams and Lieutenant (jg)s Richard W. Russell, Lawrence E. Helmuth, John M. Davis and William Maier.
- 26 Oct 1944: Strikes continued against the Japanese Fleet and Lieutenant Leroy H. Grau was awarded the Navy Cross for a successful torpedo attack against a Japanese light cruiser.
- Nov 1944: The squadron continued to provide support for the Occupation of Leyte, striking targets on Luzon.
- 13 Nov 1944: The squadron’s commanding officer, Lieutenant Commander R. Denniston, Jr., was lost on a combat mission over Manila Harbor.
- Dec 1944: Squadron aircraft struck targets on Luzon in support of the landings on Mindoro.
- 18 Dec 1944: While operating east of the Philippines the task force was overtaken by an unusually severe typhoon causing the loss of three destroyers and damage to several other ships, including four light carriers.
- Jan 1945: In early January, the squadron struck ships and targets on Formosa and Luzon in support of the landings in Lingayen Gulf, Luzon.
- 9–20 Jan 1945: The squadron participated in operations in the South China Sea, the first time an American Task Force had entered these waters since the beginning of the war. The squadron struck targets at Cam Ranh Bay and a convoy off Qui Nhon, French Indo-China; shipping at the Pescadores Island; and Hong Kong.

=== 1950s ===
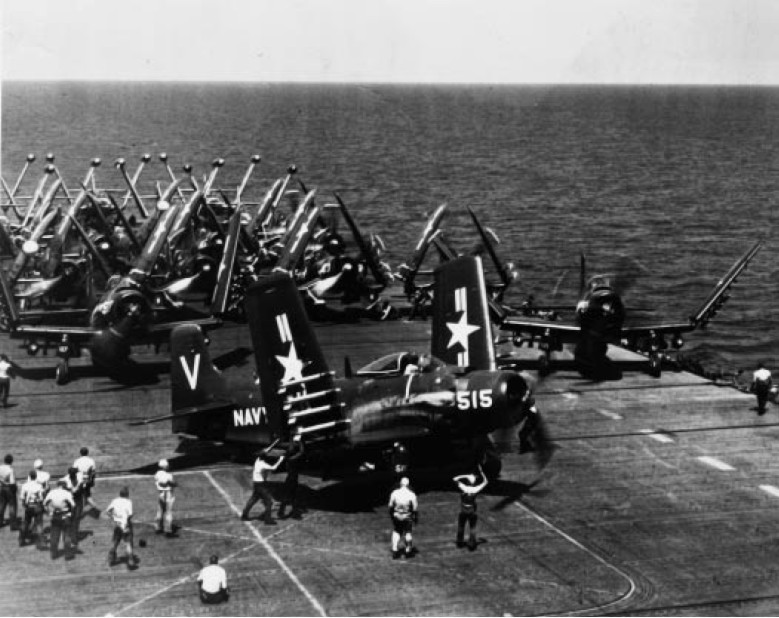
VA-115 AD-4s on USS Philippine Sea in September 1950.

In July 1950, VA-115 deployed aboard USS Philippine Sea for nine months conducting strikes at Inchon, South Korea in preparation for landings in September 1950. During and after the invasion the squadron flew deep support missions and also encountered MiG-15s. On 31 December 1951, VA-115 provided close air support for American troops in the Chosen Reservoir area and flew combat missions against North Korean rail, transportation, communication, industrial and supply targets. VA-115 flew 2,268 combat missions over both Korea deployments. For this outstanding performance, the squadron was awarded the Presidential Unit Citation.

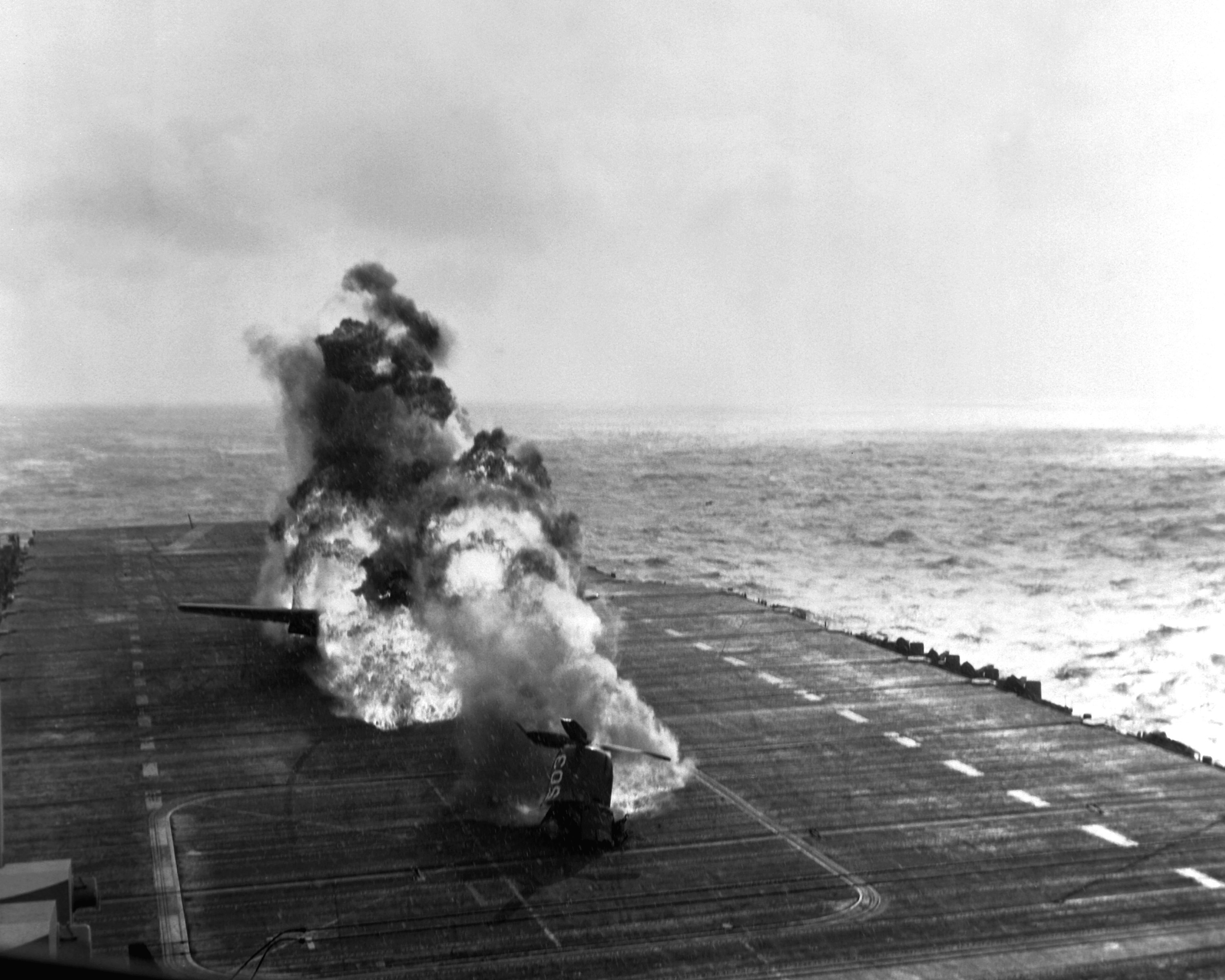
Crash of an AD-4 on USS Philippine Sea in December 1950

In June 1952, the squadron participated in coordinated strikes against North Korean hydroelectric power plants – the first heavy attacks conducted against these installations. Nine different hydroelectric power plants were struck. VA-115 made two deployments to Korea in 1950/51 and 1951/52 aboard USS Philippine Sea. It returned to Korea shortly after the Armistice Agreement in July 1953 aboard USS Kearsarge. This was followed by another deployment on USS Kearsarge in 1954/55.

In February 1955, the squadron flew air cover missions during the evacuation of over 26,000 personnel from Tachen Islands which had come under bombardment by the People’s Republic of China (PRC) in January. In August and September 1958, the squadron was part of the task force that provided support to the Republic of China during the shelling of the Quemoy Island group by the PRC.

CVG-11 then moved to USS Essex in 1956, followed by two cruises aboard USS Shangri-La in 1958 and 1959.

==== Timeline ====
- 12–18 Sep 1950: The squadron participated in the pre-assault strikes against targets in and around Inchon, Korea, in preparation for the landings there on 15 September. During and after the invasion, the squadron continued to fly deep support missions into the areas surrounding Inchon, striking at targets of opportunity.
- 9 Nov 1950: The squadron's first encounter with MiG-15s was during a mission against Sinuiju, Korea. All the aircraft returned safely to Philippine Sea. Dec 1950: The squadron provided close air support for American troops in the Chosen Reservoir area. Feb–Jul 1952: The squadron’s combat missions in Korea during this time period centered on rail interdiction, with some strikes against North Korean transportation, communication, industrial and supply facilities.
- 23–24 Jun 1952: The squadron participated in coordinated strikes against North Korean hydroelectric power plants, these were the first heavy attacks conducted against these installations. Nine different hydroelectric power plants were struck by forces from Carrier Air Groups 2, 7, 11, 19, and the 5th Air Force.
- Feb 1955: The squadron flew air cover missions during the evacuation of over 26,000 personnel from Tachen Islands which had come under bombardment by the People’s Republic of China in January.
- Aug–Sep 1958: The squadron was part of the task force that provided support to the Republic of China during the shelling of the Quemoy Island group by the Chinese Communists.

=== 1960s ===
In 1960 the squadron adopted the nickname "Arabs" after passage through the Suez Canal, while being deployed aboard USS Hancock in 1960/61.

Later in 1961 CVW-11 was reassigned to USS Kitty Hawk. VA-115 made three deployments aboard Kitty Hawk to the Western Pacific between 1962 and 1966. In May and June 1964, during the Laotian crisis, the squadron flew Combat Air Patrol and Search and Rescue.

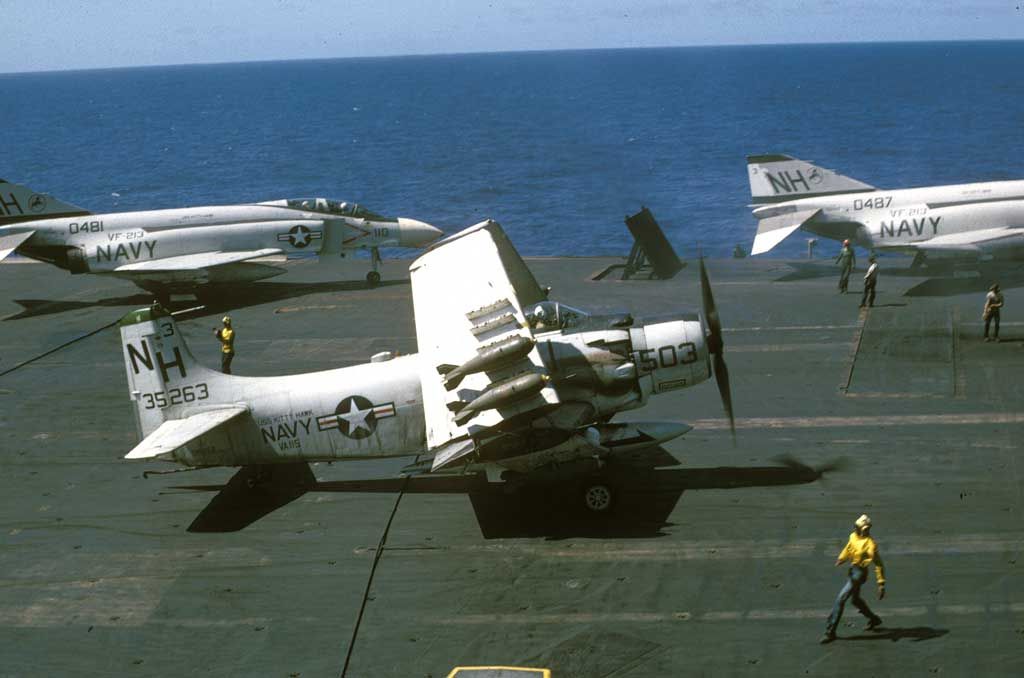
VA-115 A-1H on USS Kitty Hawk in 1966

In October 1965, the squadron returned to Southeast Asia. During six months on Yankee Station in the Gulf of Tonkin, VA-115 flew 2,051 sorties, over 8,000 hours and delivered 3,200 t (7,100,000 lb) of ordnance against enemy targets in Vietnam. In September 1966, VA-115 joined Carrier Air Wing Five aboard USS Hancock and made its second deployment to Vietnam from January to July 1967.

From August 1967 to January 1970, the squadron was put in an inactive, stand-down status. This was a transitional period as the squadron awaited the arrival of the A-6 Intruder, and there were no aircraft and only a few administrative personnel assigned. This is the only known instance in which a squadron was not disestablished but remained on the active squadron inventory in an inactive status.

=== 1970s ===
In January 1970, the squadron resumed active status and was reassigned to Naval Air Station Whidbey Island, Washington for transition to the A-6 Intruder. The squadron received their first KA-6D tanker aircraft in February 1971. In 1970 VA-115 was assigned to Carrier Air Wing 16 (CVW-16) (tail code "AH") for deployment on the modernized USS Midway. However, the modernization of Midway took longer than expected, CVW-16 was disestablished in 1971 and all its squadrons were assigned to Carrier Air Wing Five (CVW-5) (tail code "NF"). From 1971 to 1990 VA-115 and CVW-5 were assigned to USS Midway. In 1971 and 1972/73 USS Midway made two deployments to Vietnam. From May to October 1972 VA-115 participated in Operation Linebacker, where VA-115 earned a fourth Presidential Unit Citation.

In September 1973, USS Midway changed homeport to Yokosuka, Japan, and CVW-5 was based at NAF Atsugi. USS Midway and VA-115 would again serve off the coast of Vietnam and in 1975, participated in Operation Eagle Pull, the evacuation of Phnom Penh and Operation Frequent Wind, the evacuation of Saigon.

In August and September 1976 USS Midway and VA-115 operated off Korea following the Axe murder incident. In early 1977, VA-115 transitioned to the A-6E. The squadron then became the "Eagles," officially changing the nickname in March 1978.

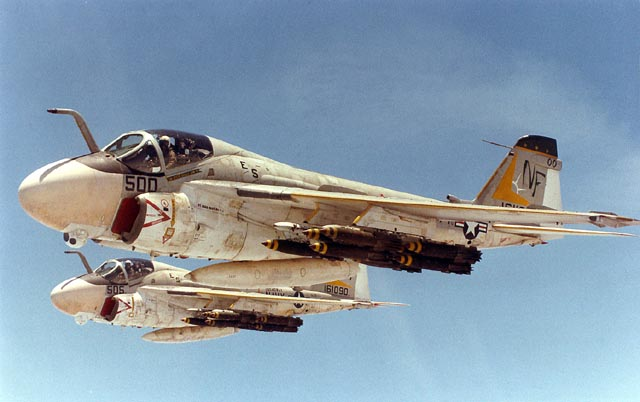
VA-115 A-6s from USS Midway in the early 1980s

From April to May 1979 USS Midway, with VA-115 embarked, deployed to the Gulf of Aden to relieve USS Constellation and maintain a U.S. carrier presence following the outbreak of fighting between North Yemen and South Yemen and the Iranian Revolution. As a response to anti-American demonstrations in Iran, Midway and her air wing, including VA-115, were ordered to deploy to the Indian Ocean for the second time from October to December 1979, when an Iranian mob also seized the American Embassy and its staff.

=== 1980s ===
In May and June 1980 following the Gwangju Uprising in South Korea, the squadron operated from Midway off the coast of South Korea until the crisis subsided. USS Midway operated again off South Korea in December 1981 following political unrest. During the 1988 Summer Olympics, in Seoul, South Korea, the squadron was embarked on Midway operating in the Sea of Japan to demonstrate U.S. support for a peaceful Olympics.

=== 1990s ===
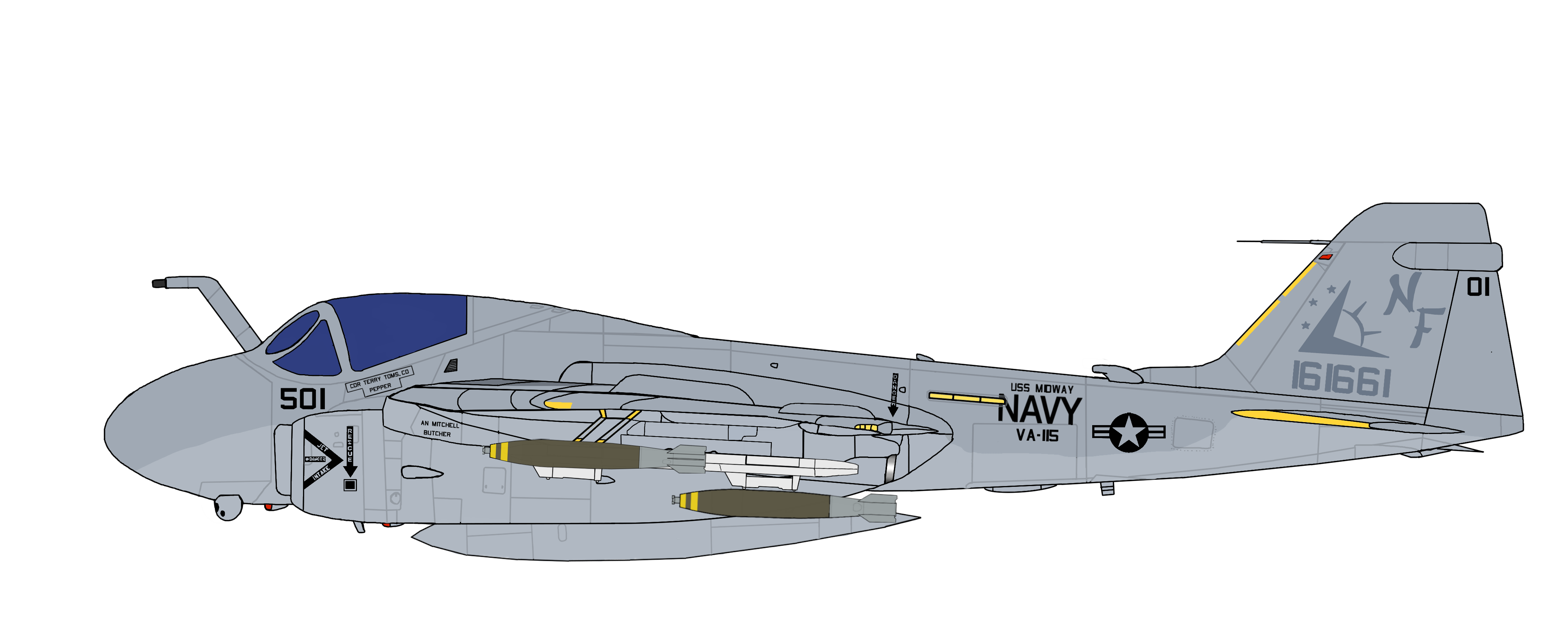
NF-501, one of the aircraft that participated in the first strike on Ahmad Al-Jaber Air Base in occupied Kuwait on January 17, 1991.

The squadron deployed again to the Middle East in support of Operation Earnest Will, the escort of re-flagged Kuwaiti tankers in the Persian Gulf. In October 1990, the squadron deployed to the North Persian Gulf in support of Operation Desert Shield. At 2:00AM on 17 January 1991, VA-115's Intruders launched from the deck of USS Midway to attack two airfields to mark the beginning of Operation Desert Storm. At around 4:00AM, they struck Ahmad Al-Jaber Air Base in occupied Kuwait and Shaibah Air Base in Southern Iraq. In total, the squadron flew 456 combat sorties and delivered 724,000 pounds of ordnance against enemy targets in Iraq and occupied Kuwait during the war. The squadron also was credited with the confirmed destruction of 12 Iraqi naval vessels. In August 1991, the squadron switched to the USS Independence, as USS Midway retired as the Navy's forward deployed aircraft carrier homeported in Japan. During that change, they received VA-196's A-6E SWIP aircraft.

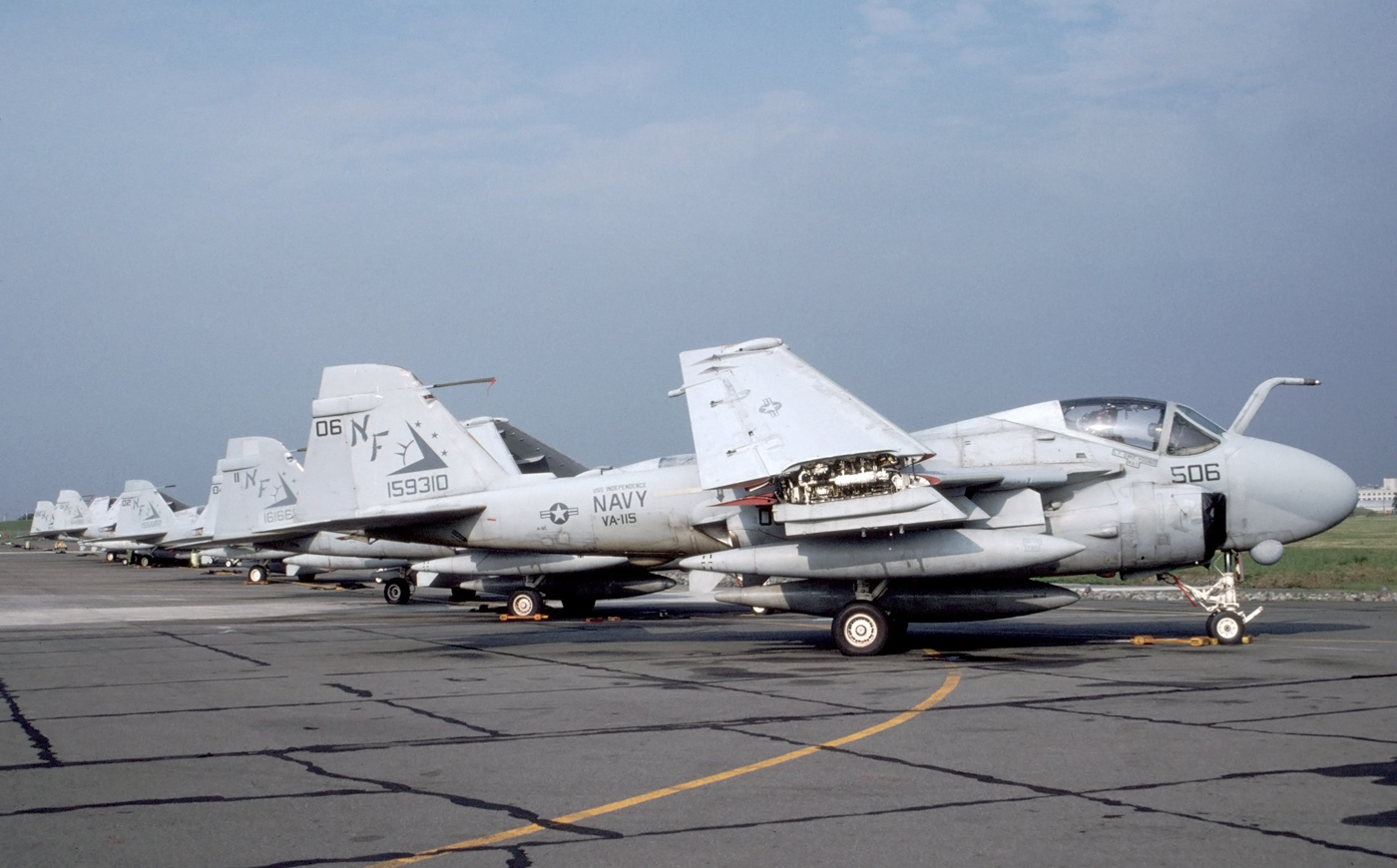
A lineup of VA-115's A-6E SWIP Intruders at NAF Atsugi in 1994.

In 1992, NF-515, an A-6E SWIP Intruder led to VA-115 becoming the first A-6 squadron to fire the AGM-65 Maverick at an Open Ocean target, with the Maverick being one of the new weapons the SWIP Intruder could carry. That same year, deployed to the Persian Gulf in support of Operation Southern Watch enforcing United Nations resolutions against Iraq. The squadron was awarded the Meritorious Unit Commendation for their performance flying 115 combat missions over Iraq. In 1993, VA-115 deployed to the Persian Gulf in support of Operation Southern Watch, and in 1994 they received four aircraft with night vision device capability. In 1996, VA-115 supported contingency operations in the vicinity of Taiwan.

In October 1996, the squadron conducted a homeport change to NAS Lemoore, California and began transition to their fifth aircraft, the F/A-18C Hornet. They were redesignated as Strike Fighter Squadron 115 (VFA-115) on 30 September 1996. The squadron accepted 12 F/A-18Cs in six months and joined CVW-14 on board USS Abraham Lincoln. In June 1998 the squadron deployed to the Persian Gulf in support of Operation Southern Watch.

After two deployments in the "C" model Hornet, the squadron was chosen to be the first Navy squadron to transition to the F/A-18E Super Hornet. VFA-115 was also the first fleet squadron to receive the Advanced Tactical Forward Looking InfraRed targeting pod.

=== 2000s ===
In July 2002, the squadron embarked on the first fleet Super Hornet combat deployment, flying 214 combat missions in support of Operation Enduring Freedom and Operation Southern Watch (OSW). The squadron dropped 22 JDAM on 14 targets in Iraq, before taking part in Operation Iraqi Freedom. Before hostilities ceased on 9 April 2003, the squadron dropped 170 t (370,000 lb) of ordnance and passed 1.2 mio l (3.5 million lb) of fuel in the tanker support role. This wartime performance earned the squadron and the Abraham Lincoln Battle Group the Navy Unit Commendation (the sixth awarded to VFA-115).

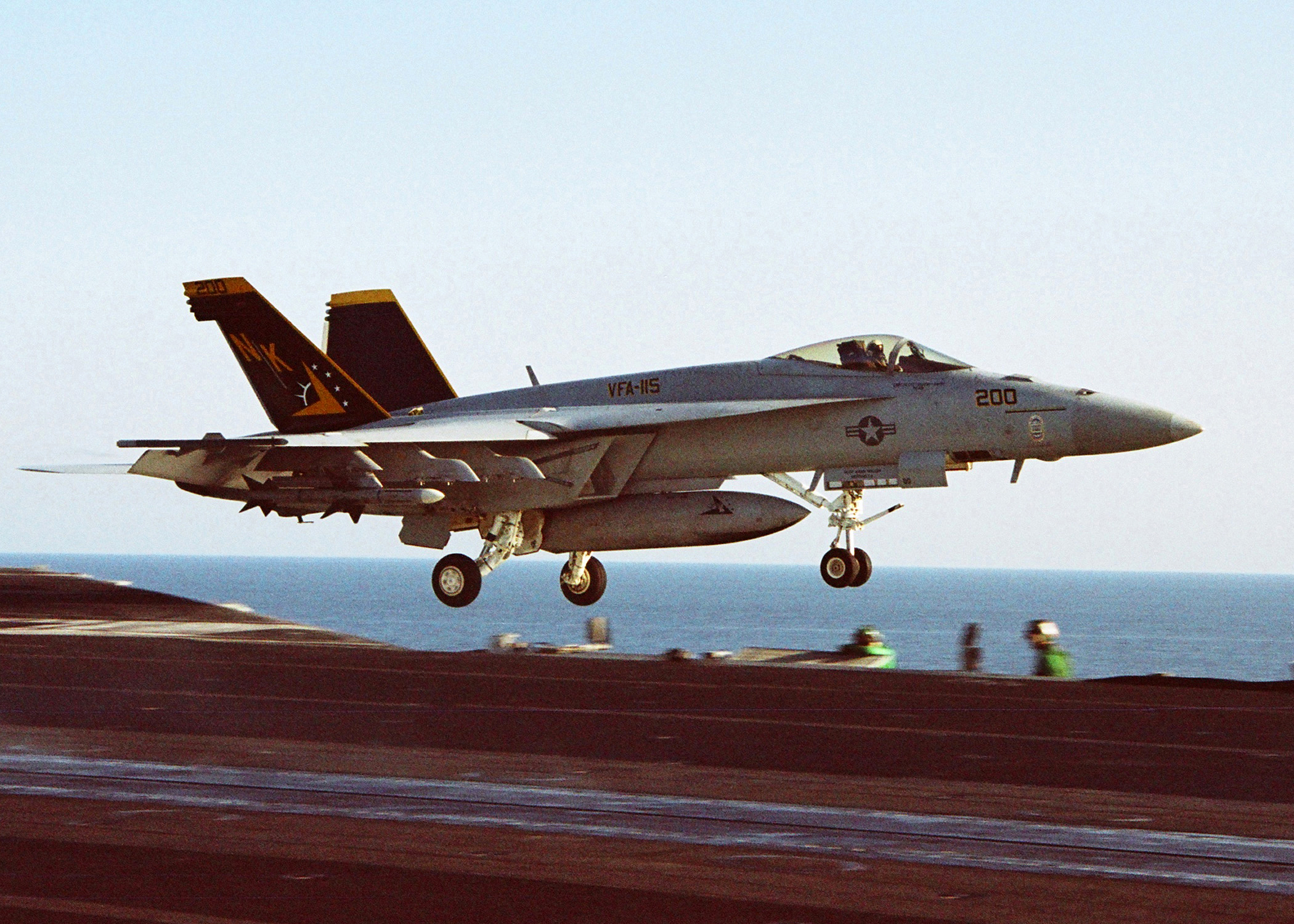
NK-200, the CAG Bird of VFA-115, launch from the USS Abraham Lincoln (CVN-72) on 9 October 2002.

In May 2004, the squadron deployed aboard USS John C. Stennis. In support of the "Fleet Response Plan", the squadron participated in various joint exercises including "Northern Edge", "Rim of the Pacific", "Joint Air and Sea Exercise" and a MiG-29 passage exercise. Additionally, VFA-115 authored a comprehensive joint doctrine for maritime interdiction. This document was adopted by Commander Pacific Fleet and Chief of Naval Operations as the model for joint employment, and is today the primary training focus for deploying U.S. West Coast strike groups. The squadron was awarded the Commander Naval Air Pacific Battle Efficiency Award for 2004.

In January 2006, the squadron deployed aboard USS Ronald Reagan to the Persian Gulf in support of Operation Iraqi Freedom. VFA-115 flew hundreds of combat sorties providing close air support for the U.S. Army and U.S. Marine Corps, tanking for the carrier-based aircraft, and maritime interdiction for the strike group.

In January 2007, VFA-115 again deployed aboard USS Ronald Reagan, returning in April 2007 to resume shore based flight training at NAS Lemoore. On 19 May 2008 VFA-115 started another deployment aboard USS Ronald Reagan to the Western Pacific and the Indian Ocean.

On 28 May 2009, VFA-115 deployed with Carrier Air Wing 14 aboard USS Ronald Reagan to the 7th and 5th Fleet Areas of Responsibility. On 13 December 2009, VFA-115 returned to Naval Air Facility Atsugi for the first time since 1996 to replace VFA-192 as a forward deployed squadron under CVW-5.

=== 2010s ===
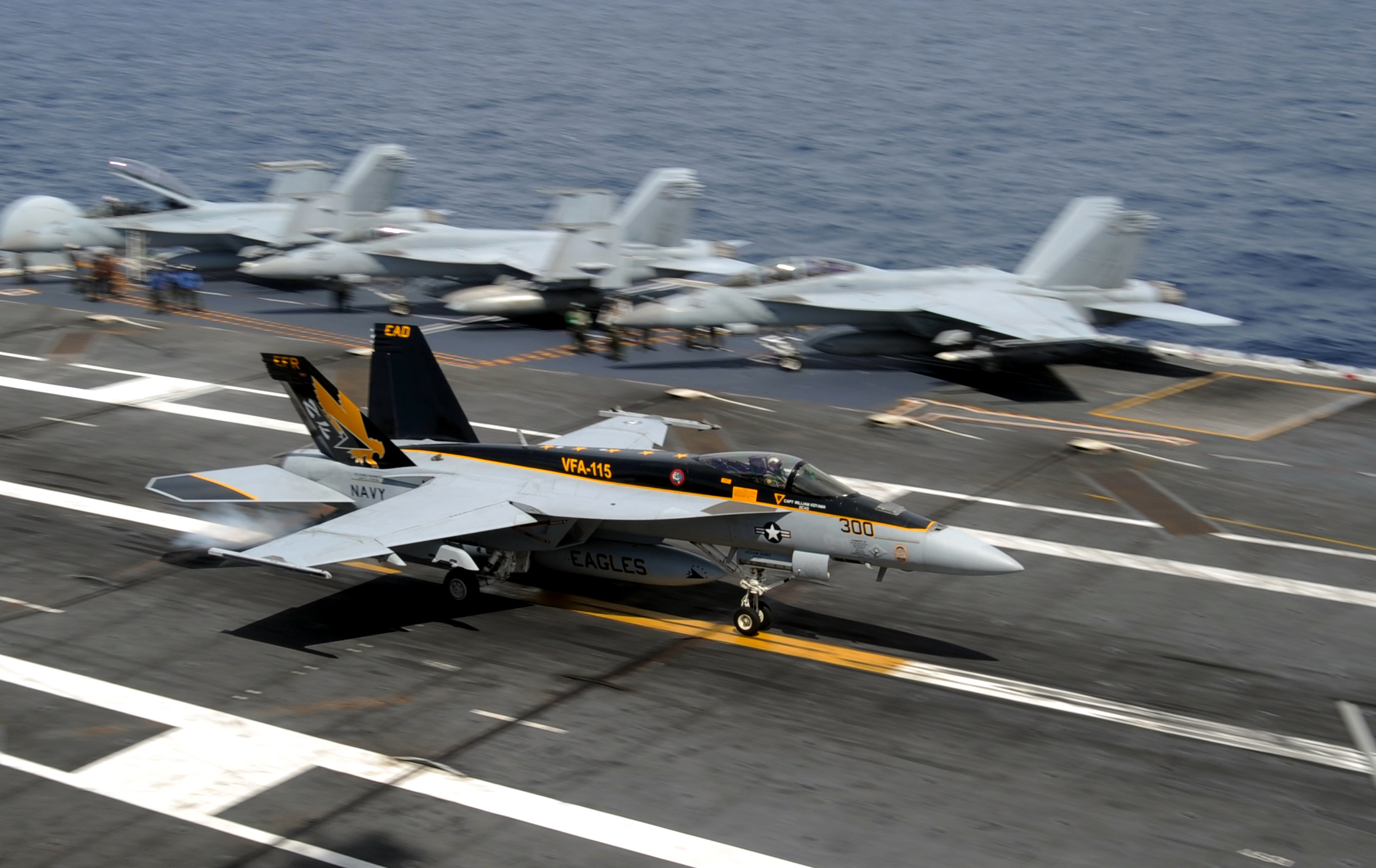
VFA-115 F/A-18E landing on USS George Washington, in 2013.

During July 2015, VFA-115 took part in Exercise Talisman Sabre 2015 with Australia. The following month on 9 August 2015, VFA-115 participated in the "Three Carrier Hull Swap" as Ronald Reagan took over the duty from USS George Washington as the U.S. Navy's forward-deployed aircraft carrier in Japan.

The squadron moved to Marine Corps Air Station Iwakuni on 28 November 2017 when it returned from its patrol aboard USS Ronald Reagan. Between 11 July 2019 and 24 July 2019, VFA-115 and CVW-5 took part in Exercise Talisman Sabre 2019 in the Coral Sea.

=== 2020s ===
On 19 May 2021, VFA-115 deployed on the Ronald Reagan with CVW-5 to the North Arabian Sea. During the deployment, it took part in the US withdrawal from Afghanistan. They then returned on 16 October. In July 2024 as part of CVW-5 returning to the USS George Washington, VFA-115 will leave the Air Wing return to the United States to transition to the F-35C while VFA-147 which is operating the F-35C will take its place in CVW-5.

In March 2026, VFA-115 earned its Safe for Flight qualification. The squadron has received its first four aircraft with markings and are expected to be attached to the USS Ronald Reagan in 2027.

== Home port assignments ==
The squadron was assigned to these home ports, effective on the dates shown:

- NAS San Diego – 10 Oct 1942
- NAS Pearl Harbor – 1 Nov 1942*
- NAS Barbers Point – 7 Nov 1942*
- NAF Nandi (in the Fiji Islands) – 28 Feb 1943*
- NAF Guadalcanal (Henderson Field) – 17 Apr 1943
- NAS Alameda – 19 Aug 1943
- NAS Hilo – 8 Apr 1944*
- NAS Barbers Point – 19 Jun 1944*
- NAS Alameda – 24 Feb 1945
- NAAS Fallon – 30 Apr 1945*
- NAAS Santa Rosa – 26 Jul 1945
- NAS Kahului – 22 Feb 1946
- NAS San Diego – 26 Nov 1946
- NAS Miramar – 15 Sep 1952
- NAS Moffett Field – 8 Dec 1961†
- NAS Lemoore – 3 Apr 1963
- NAS Whidbey Island – 1 Jan 1970
- CFA Yokosuka (NAF Atsugi & Misawa Air Base) – 5 Oct 1973
- NAS Lemoore – Oct 1996
- CFA Yokosuka (NAF Atsugi & Misawa Air Base) – 13 Dec 2009
- CFA Yokosuka (MCAS Iwakuni) – 28 Nov 2017
- NAS Lemoore – 15 Jul 2024

* Temporary shore assignment while the squadron conducted training in preparation for combat deployment.

== Aircraft assignment ==
The squadron first received the following aircraft on the dates shown:

- TBF-1 Avenger – Oct 1942
- TBM-1 Avenger – 13 Oct 1943
- TBM-1C Avenger – Nov 1943
- TBM-3 Avenger – 19 Dec 1944
- TBM-3E Avenger – Apr 1945
- TBM-3Q Avenger – Jan 1947
- TBM-3W Avenger – Oct 1947
- AD-1 Skyraider – Dec 1948
- AD-2 Skyraider – 20 Dec 1948
- AD-3Q Skyraider – Aug 1949
- AD-4 Skyraider – Dec 1949
- AD-4Q Skyraider – Jul 1950
- AD-4L Skyraider – May 1951
- AD-4NA Skyraider – Aug 1952
- AD-6/A-1H Skyraider – Jan 1954
- AD-7/A-1J Skyraider – Nov 1958
- A-6A Intruder – 3 Apr 1970
- KA-6D Intruder – Feb 1971
- A-6B Intruder – Oct 1973
- A-6E Intruder – Apr 1977
- A-6E TRAM Intruder – 10 May 1980
- A-6E SWIP Intruder – 17 Aug 1991
- F/A-18C Hornet – Oct 1996
- F/A-18E Super Hornet – 2002
- F-35C Lightning II – 2025

== See also ==
- Naval aviation
- Modern US Navy carrier air operations
- List of United States Navy aircraft squadrons
- List of Inactive United States Navy aircraft squadrons
- Attack aircraft
- History of the United States Navy
