= Second VA-125 (U.S. Navy) =

Attack Squadron 125
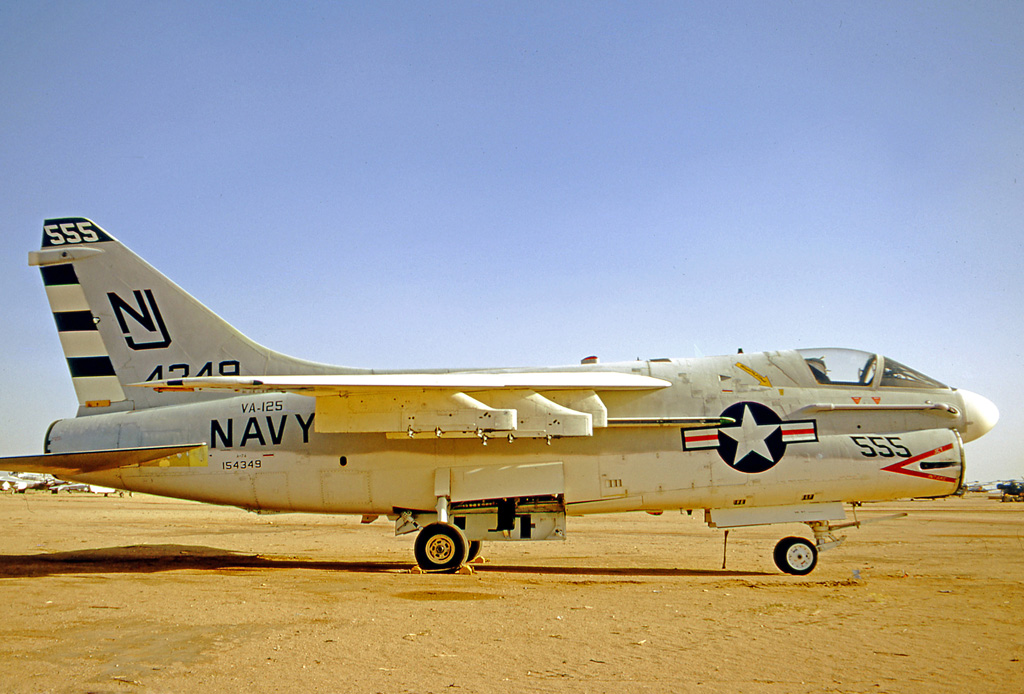
- An A-7A Corsair II, formerly of VA-125, in the aircraft boneyard at Davis Monthan AFB in 1971
- Active: 30 June 1956 - 1 October 1977
- Country: United States
- Branch: United States Navy
- Type: Attack
- Nickname(s): Skylancers; Rough Raiders

Aircraft flown
- Attack: F9F-8 Cougar; A4 Skyhawk; A-7 Corsair II

VA-125 was an Attack Squadron of the U.S. Navy, and was the second squadron to bear the VA-125 designation. It was established as VA-26 on 30 June 1956, and redesignated VA-125 on 11 April 1958. The squadron was disestablished on 1 October 1977. Its nickname was Skylanchers from 1956-1958, and Rough Raiders thereafter.

== Operational history ==
- 11 April 1958: The squadron’s mission was changed from air-to-ground/surface attack to the indoctrination and training of pilots and enlisted personnel in attack aircraft for assignment to combat carrier squadrons.
- 11 December 1958: The squadron’s commanding officer, Commander J. E. Thomas, was killed in an aircraft accident.
- March 1960: With the addition of the A4D-2N Skyhawk, the squadron added radar and inflight refueling training to its flight syllabus.
- 19 May 1966: VA-125 was the first squadron in the Navy to receive the TA-4F Skyhawk.
- June 1966: The first of several groups of Australians arrived for training by the squadron on the A-4 Skyhawk. The pilots were to form the nucleus of Australia’s first A-4 squadron scheduled for assignment to HMAS Melbourne.
- 13 March 1967: The squadron’s commanding officer, Commander J. D. Shaw, was killed in an aircraft accident during a routine carrier qualification exercise on the USS Kearsarge.
- 31 March 1969: The last A-4 Fleet Replacement Pilot class began.
- 30 June 1969: The last A-4 Fleet Replacement Enlisted Maintenance training program was completed.
- November 1969: The squadron began to develop the required training program for the Light Attack Weapons School. In December 1969 the squadron, in conjunction with VA-122, inaugurated a graduate level course for the Light Attack Weapons School that involved all phases of attack aviation.
- January 1970: The first A-7 Fleet Replacement Enlisted Maintenance and Fleet Replacement Pilot classes began.

== Home port assignments ==
The squadron was assigned to these home ports, effective on the dates shown:

- NAS Miramar – 30 June 1956
- NAS Moffett Field – August 1956
- NAS Lemoore – 24 July 1961

== Aircraft assignment ==
The squadron first received the following aircraft on the dates shown:

- F9F-8B Cougar – Jul 1956
- F9F-8 Cougar – Oct 1956
- A4D-1 Skyhawk – 10 Jun 1958
- A4D-2/A-4B Skyhawk – Aug 1958
- A4D-2N/A-4C Skyhawk – 03 Mar 1960
- AD-5/A-1E Skyraider – Sep 1960
- A-4E Skyhawk – Dec 1962
- TA-4F Skyhawk – 19 May 1966
- A-4F Skyhawk – Feb 1968
- A-7B Corsair II – 25 Sep 1969
- A-7A Corsair II – Oct 1969
- A-7C Corsair II – Aug 1975

== See also ==
- VA-125 (U.S. Navy)
- Attack aircraft
- List of inactive United States Navy aircraft squadrons
- History of the United States Navy
