= VA-125 (U.S. Navy) =

Attack Squadron 125
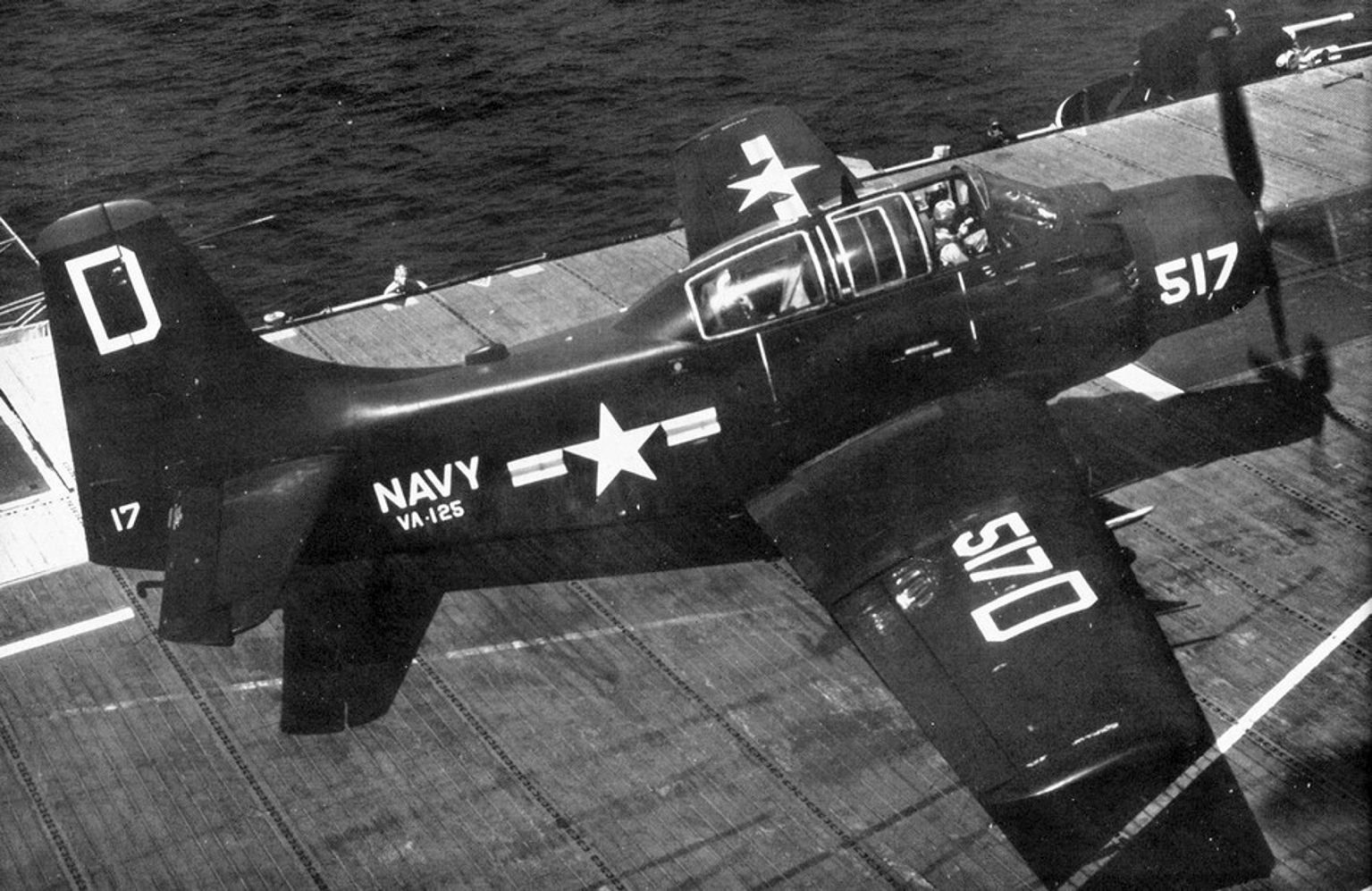
- VA-125 AD-5 Skyraider aboard the USS Hancock c.1955
- Active: 1946 - 10 April 1958
- Country: United States
- Branch: United States Navy
- Type: Attack
- Engagements: Korean War

Aircraft flown
- Attack: TBM Avenger; AM Mauler; AD Skyraider

VA-125 was an Attack Squadron of the U.S. Navy. It was established as Reserve Attack Squadron VA-55E, most likely during the activation of the Naval Air Reserve in 1946. It remained in an inactive status until January 1950, when it was redesignated VA-923. The squadron was called to active duty on 20 July 1950. It was redesignated VA-125 on 4 February 1953, and disestablished on 10 April 1958. Its nickname was the Rough Raiders from 1952 onward.

A second, unrelated, squadron was designated VA-125 in 1956.

== Significant events ==
- 1 February 1953: The squadron’s commanding officer, Commander J. C. Micheel, was killed in action in Korea.

== Home port assignments ==
The squadron was assigned to these home ports, effective on the dates shown:

- NAS St. Louis – Assigned prior to 1950. Exact date unknown.
- NAS San Diego – 02 Aug 1950
- NAS Miramar – Jan 1952

== Aircraft assignment ==
The squadron first received the following aircraft on the dates shown:

- TBM Avenger – Prior to 1950. Exact date unknown.
- AM Mauler – 1950
- AD-2 Skyraider – Sep 1950
- AD-4Q Skyraider – Oct 1950
- AD-4 Skyraider – Dec 1950
- AD-3 Skyraider – Dec 1950
- AD-4B Skyraider – Jun 1953
- AD-4NA Skyraider – Sep 1953
- AD-6 Skyraider – Oct 1954
- AD-7 Skyraider – Jan 1957

== See also ==
- List of squadrons in the Dictionary of American Naval Aviation Squadrons
- Second VA-125 (U.S. Navy)
- Attack aircraft
- List of inactive United States Navy aircraft squadrons
- History of the United States Navy
