= VPB-151 =

Patrol Bombing Squadron 151
- Active: 3 January 1944 – 30 June 1945
- Country: United States of America
- Branch: United States Navy
- Type: squadron
- Role: Maritime patrol
- Engagements: World War II

Aircraft flown
- Patrol: PV-1

VPB-151 was a Patrol Bombing Squadron of the U.S. Navy. The squadron was established as Bombing Squadron 151 (VB-151) on 3 January 1944, redesignated Patrol Bombing Squadron 151 (VPB-151) on 1 October 1944 and disestablished on 30 June 1945.

== Operational history ==
- 3 January 1944: VB-151 was established at NAS Whidbey Island, Washington, under the operational control of FAW-6, as a medium bombing squadron flying the PV-1 Ventura. Training and shakedown was conducted at NAS Whidbey Island through mid-April 1944.
- 15 April – July 1944: The squadron flew to NAS Alameda, California, to begin preparations for its transportation to Naval Base Pearl Harbor, Hawaii. The squadron departed from San Francisco, California, aboard USS Sitkoh Bay on 30 April, arriving at Pearl Harbor on 6 May. The equipment and aircraft were unloaded and flown to NAS Kaneohe Bay, Hawaii, on the 7th. Training at NAS Kaneohe Bay continued through the end of July.
- 5 August 1944: VB-151 was transferred to NAB Hawkins Field, Tarawa. Bombing missions were conducted against Nauru and Jaluit Atoll.
- 29 August – 18 November 1944: VB-151 was relocated to NAB North Field, Tinian, Marianas Islands. Daily search sectors of 400 miles (640 km), 500 miles (800 km) and 600 miles (970 km) were flown. Frequent attacks were conducted against the Yap, Woleai, Rota and Pagan islands. One flight crew was shot down over Woleai by anti-aircraft (AA) fire; all hands were lost. On 18 November, the squadron was relocated to West Field, Tinian.
- 1 January – 18 February 1945: The squadron was engaged in air cover for Cruiser Division 5 en route to attack Iwo Jima. From 13 to 18 February 1945, VPB-151 engaged in advance air screen tasking against enemy ships, submarines and aircraft for the Fifth Fleet, preparatory to the attack on the Japanese home islands and Iwo Jima.
- 13–19 March 1945: Six squadron aircraft were sent to Iwo Jima to provide anti-picket boat sweeps in advance of TF 58.
- 4–30 June 1945: VPB-151 was relieved by VPB-142 for return to NAS Kaneohe Bay and the continental U.S. After arrival at Kaneohe, the squadron turned over its aircraft to the HEDRON and boarded USS Breton bound for NAS San Diego, California. Upon arrival on the 21st, all hands were ordered to prepare for disestablishment. On 30 June 1945 VPB-151 was disestablished at NAS San Diego.

== Aircraft assignments ==
The squadron was assigned the following aircraft, effective on the dates shown:

- PV-1 - January 1944

== Home port assignments ==
The squadron was assigned to these home ports, effective on the dates shown:

- NAS Whidbey Island, Washington - 3 January 1944
- NAS Alameda, California - 15 April 1944
- NAS Kaneohe Bay, Hawaii - 7 May 1944
- NAS San Diego, California - 21 June 1945

== See also ==
- Maritime patrol aircraft
- List of inactive United States Navy aircraft squadrons
- List of United States Navy aircraft squadrons
- List of squadrons in the Dictionary of American Naval Aviation Squadrons
- History of the United States Navy
