= VP-152 =

Patrol Squadron 152
- Active: 1 April 1944 – 14 June 1946
- Country: United States of America
- Branch: United States Navy
- Type: squadron
- Role: Maritime patrol
- Engagements: World War II

Aircraft flown
- Patrol: PV-1; PV-2

VP-152 was a Patrol Squadron of the U.S. Navy. The squadron was established as Bombing Squadron 152 (VB-152) on 1 April 1944, redesignated Patrol Bombing Squadron 152 (VPB-152) on 1 October 1944, redesignated Patrol Squadron 152 (VP-152) on 15 May 1946 and disestablished on 14 June 1946.

== Operational history ==
- 1 April 1944: VB-152 was established at NAS Clinton, Oklahoma, as a medium bombing squadron flying the PV-1 Ventura. Unlike other PV-1 squadrons, VB-152 was organized as a special squadron under the operational control of the Training Task Force to carry a target seeking glide bomb known as Pelican. The device was equipped with beam-rider radar homing equipment developed by the Bureau of Ordnance Special Design Section in April 1942. Production of the missile was begun at Charleston, South Carolina., in September 1943. The missile was initially developed to be used against submarines and was designed around the casing of the standard 525-pound Depth charge. The disadvantage of the missile was that it could not be used against defended targets because the signal was lost beyond 800-foot (240 m). In order for the missile to locate its target the mother ship had to continue on a straight course while painting the target with its radar beams.
- 29 April 1944: The squadron was split into three divisions for the purpose of operational training. Each was sent in turn to NAS Houma, Louisiana, for training as Pelican carriers.
- 22 July – October 1944: After a number of test drops showing only limited success, the project was canceled in late July 1944. VB-152 transferred its specially modified Venturas to VB-153. Throughout the months of August and September, the squadron received standard training in preparation for normal combat deployment. During the month of October the squadron was given instrument flying training. During this period the squadron ferried new PV-1 aircraft from Philadelphia, to NAS Clinton.
- 23 November – December 1944: The first division of VPB-152 flew to NAS Alameda, California, to prepare for overseas duty. The squadron came under the operational control of FAW-8 at that time. The squadron's aircraft were flown to NAS Livermore, California, for installation of long-range fuel tanks at the factory. During this interval, squadron personnel were sent to the Navigation Radar Lab at Alameda. In early December, the second division of the squadron returned from Philadelphia with the remainder of the aircraft.
- 1–25 January 1945: The squadron was split into three divisions: two at NAAS Arcata, California, and the third at Moffett Field, California. All three divisions underwent rocket training through the 25th.
- 26 January – 16 February 1945: The three divisions of the squadron rejoined the headquarters staff at NAS Alameda, where preparations were undertaken for the squadron's overseas deployment. On 10 February, the squadron departed aboard USS Sangamon, arriving at Naval Base Pearl Harbor on the 16th.
- 17 February – 30 March 1945: VPB-152 was transported to NAS Kaneohe Bay, Hawaii, where the squadron's aircraft had drop tanks installed. FAW-2 assumed operational control over the squadron at this time. On 24 February, a detachment of six aircraft and seven crews was sent to Midway Island to relieve VPB-149 on patrol duty. The remainder of the squadron at NAS Kaneohe began the standard pre-combat ground and flight training syllabus. On 30 March, the Midway detachment returned to NAS Kaneohe and rejoined the squadron in training.
- 24 April – July 1945: VPB-152 was deployed to Peleliu Airfield, Palau island group, to relieve VPB-102. The squadron came under the operational control of FAW-18 at this time. Routine antishipping searches and patrols were conducted through 12 July. On that date, the squadron was assigned the mission of special weather flights and rescue missions, assisted by three aircraft from VPB-133.
- 2 August 1945: While on routine patrol Lieutenant (jg) William C. Gwinn spotted a large oil slick with 30 survivors in the water. Further examination of the area revealed another group of 150 survivors. An immediate call for assistance was made, with Dumbo (air-sea rescue) aircraft and USS Bassett soon en route to rescue the survivors. It was discovered that these were the remainder of the crew of USS Indianapolis, sunk by Japanese submarine I-58 while outbound from Tinian. The ship had gone down without a signal on 30 July, with the majority of the ship's company subsequently dying of exposure and shark attacks. The searches continued until 8 August.
- 26 November 1945: VPB-152 was transferred to Kobler Field, Saipan. In December, the squadron assumed the responsibility for the Saipan to Marcus Island freight, mail, and passenger run with two planes making a round trip each Tuesday and Friday.
- 14 June 1946: VP-152 was disestablished at NAS Kaneohe Bay.

== Aircraft assignments ==
The squadron was assigned the following aircraft, effective on the dates shown:

- PV-1 - April 1944
- PV-2 - October 1944

== Home port assignments ==
The squadron was assigned to these home ports, effective on the dates shown:

- NAS Clinton, Oklahoma - 1 April 1944
- NAS Alameda, California - 23 November 1944
- NAS Kaneohe Bay, Hawaii - 17 February 1945

== See also ==
- Maritime patrol aircraft
- List of inactive United States Navy aircraft squadrons
- List of United States Navy aircraft squadrons
- List of squadrons in the Dictionary of American Naval Aviation Squadrons
- History of the United States Navy
