= VPB-147 =

Patrol Bombing Squadron 147
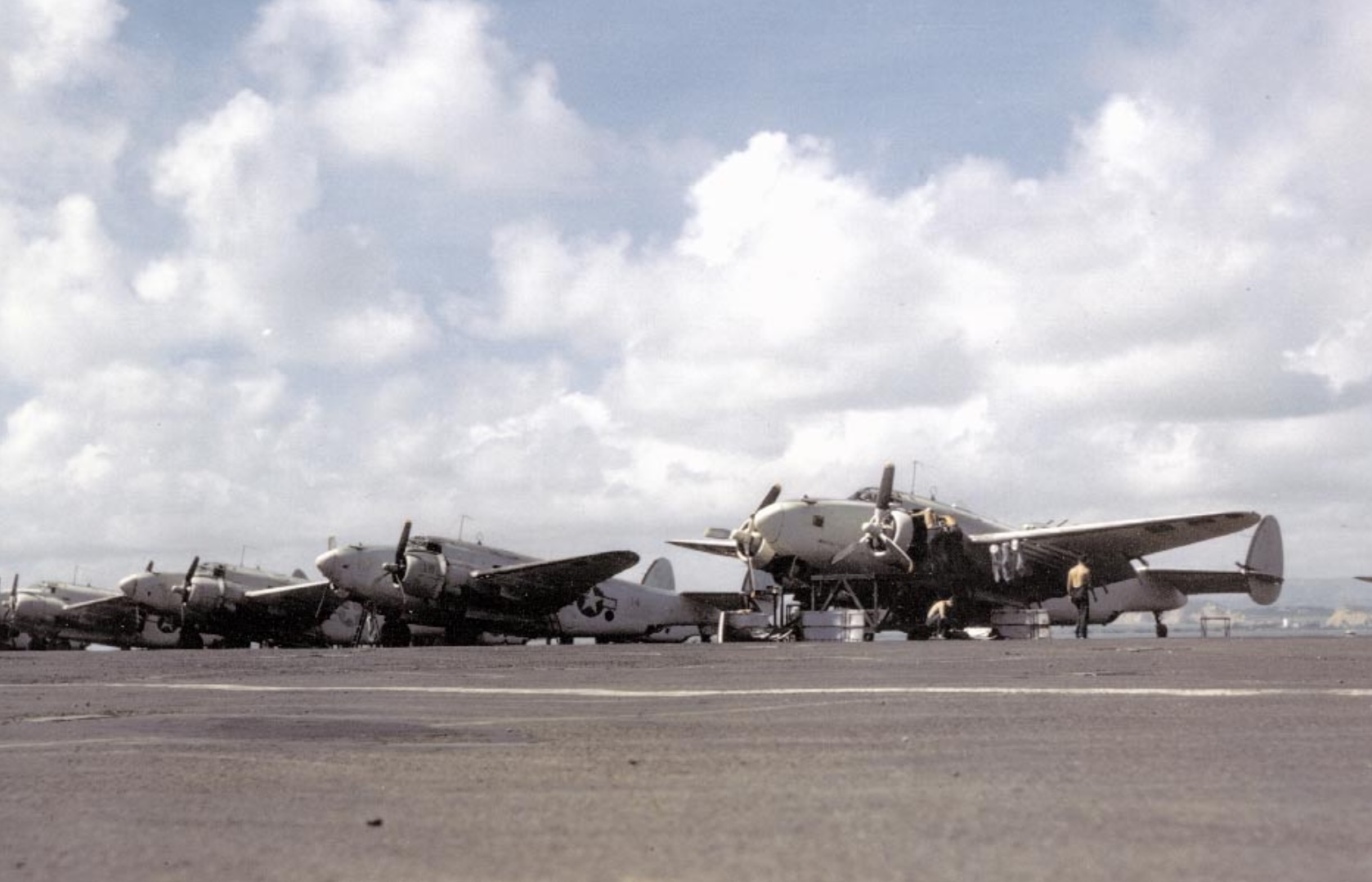
- VPB-147 PV-1s in the Caribbean in 1944
- Active: 14 August 1943 1943 - 2 July 1945
- Country: United States of America
- Branch: United States Navy
- Type: squadron
- Role: Maritime patrol
- Engagements: World War II

Aircraft flown
- Patrol: PV-1; PV-2

VPB-147 was a Patrol Bombing Squadron of the U.S. Navy. The squadron was established as Bombing Squadron 147 (VB-147) on 14 August 1943, redesignated Patrol Bombing Squadron 147 (VPB-147) on 1 October 1944 and disestablished on 2 July 1945.

== Operational history ==
- 14 August 1943: VB-147 was established at NAS Beaufort, South Carolina, under the operational control of FAW-5, as a medium bombing squadron flying the PV-1 Ventura. The squadron continued ground training and familiarization flights in the Ventura until 27 September, when it moved to NAS Quonset Point, Rhode Island, for advanced Anti-submarine warfare (ASW) training.
- 23 October 1943: VB-147 was transferred to NAS New York, New York, under the operational control of FAW-9. The squadron remained at this location for three months flying operational patrols over the convoy approaches to New York Harbor. During this period, two entire combat crews were lost in accidents over the water near the field.
- 25 January 1944: The squadron returned to NAS Quonset Point, for training at the AsDevLant school for ASW. The squadron's PV-1 aircraft were fitted with HVAR rocket launcher rails and the crews flew 290 hours in firing trials with the new rockets.
- 24 February 1944: VB-147 finished its course in ASW and relocated to NAAS Elizabeth City, North Carolina. From this location, the squadron continued its ASW patrols, search sweeps and convoy protection off the central portion of the East Coast.
- 4 May 1944: VB-147 departed the U.S. for NAAF Trinidad, British West Indies, arriving on 8 May, coming under the operational control of FAW-11. From 13 to 25 May and 1 to 30 June, a detachment of six aircraft was sent to NAAF Zandery Field, Surinam.
- 15 May 1944: One of the aircraft in the NAAF Zandery Field detachment became disoriented in a severe electrical storm at night. After fuel was exhausted the pilot had the crew parachute into the jungle below. The pilot followed after pointing the aircraft seaward and setting the autopilot. All landed safely, except for one member of the crew who had a broken rib. Ironically, the first aid kit caused the injury, when the crewman fell on it upon impact the ground. The crew was picked up shortly after reaching the ground but the pilot wandered about in the jungle for seven days before being rescued.
- 3–13 June 1944: An eight-aircraft detachment was sent to NAS San Juan, Puerto Rico.
- 1 December 1944: VPB-147 was transferred to NAF Hato Field, Curaçao.
- April 1945: The squadron received its first PV-2 Harpoon aircraft. All of the squadron pilots were checked out in the aircraft before bring in PV-2s from the US to replace the worn-out Venturas. In May, one Ventura was written off when its landing gear collapsed on landing. A second Ventura lost power on takeoff, settling back onto the runway with its gear up.
- 15 May – June 1945: All operational flights ceased. On 22 May, orders were received to return to the U.S. The squadron departed on 1 June for NAS Quonset Point. Over the next month, squadron equipment was turned in to the HEDRON and personnel received orders for demobilization or transfer. Four squadron aircraft remained with HEDRON 9-1 and the squadron pilots flew remaining aircraft to NAS Clinton, Oklahoma, for disposal.
- 2 July 1945: VPB-147 was disestablished at NAS Quonset Point.

== Aircraft assignments ==
The squadron was assigned the following aircraft, effective on the dates shown:

- PV-1 - September 1943
- PV-2 - April 1945

== Home port assignments ==
The squadron was assigned to these home ports, effective on the dates shown:

- NAS Beaufort, South Carolina - 14 August 1943
- NAS Quonset Point, Rhode Island - 27 September 1943
- NAS New York, New York - 23 October 1943
- NAS Quonset Point - 25 January 1944
- NAAS Elizabeth City, North Carolina - 24 February 1944
- NAAF Trinidad, British West Indies - 4 May 1944
- NAF Hato Field, Curaçao - 1 December 1944
- NAS Quonset Point - 1 June 1945

== See also ==
- Maritime patrol aircraft
- List of inactive United States Navy aircraft squadrons
- List of United States Navy aircraft squadrons
- List of squadrons in the Dictionary of American Naval Aviation Squadrons
- History of the United States Navy
