= Lockheed Ventura =

Family of bomber aircraft

Ventura; B-34 Lexington / B-37; PV-1 Ventura / PV-2 Harpoon
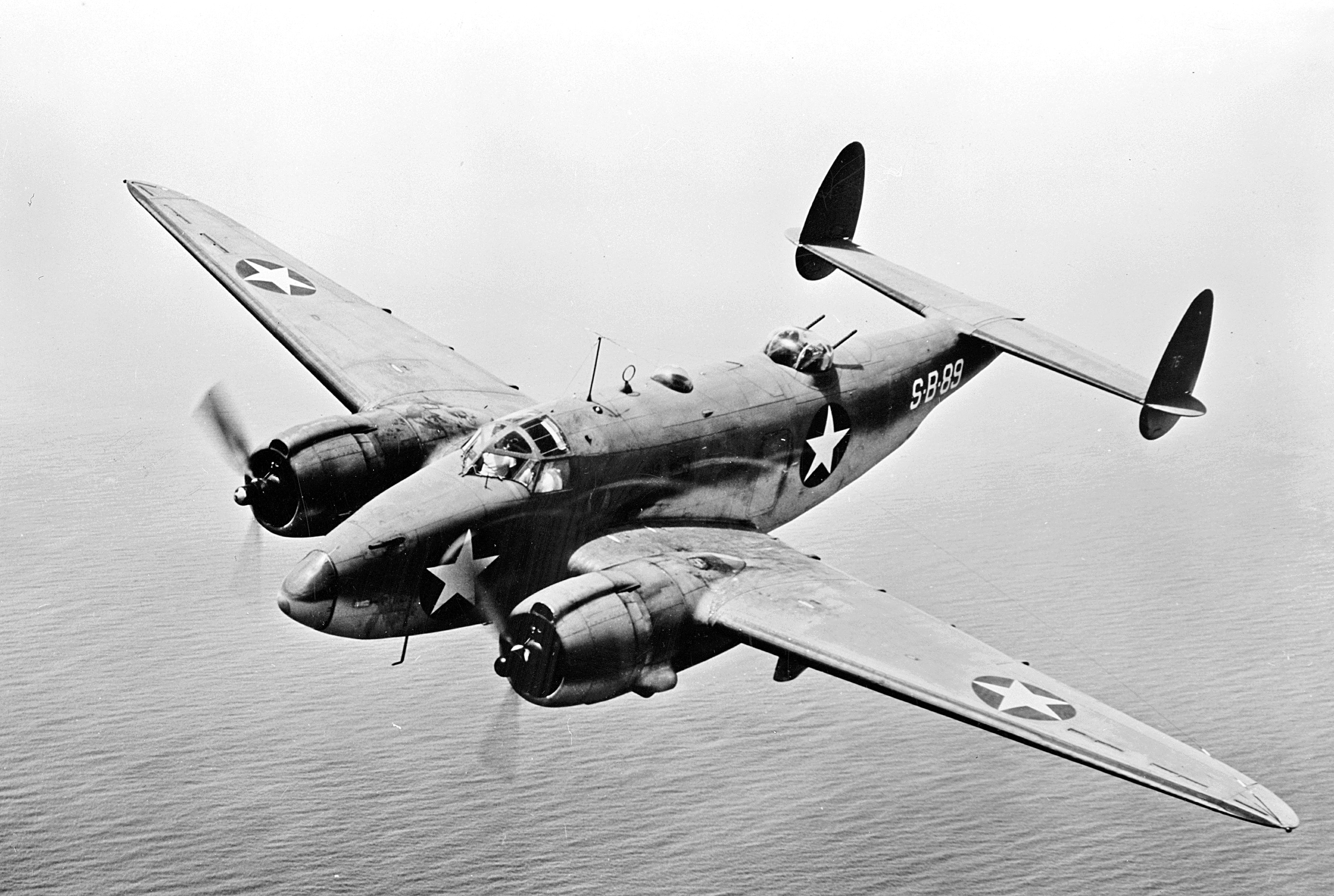
- A Lockheed PV-1 Ventura

General information
- Type: Patrol bomber
- National origin: United States
- Manufacturer: Lockheed Corporation
- Primary users: United States Navy: United States Army Air Forces; Royal Air Force
- Number built: 3,028

History
- First flight: 31 July 1941
- Developed from: Lockheed Model 18 Lodestar

The Lockheed Ventura is a twin-engine medium bomber and patrol bomber of World War II.

The Ventura first entered combat in Europe as a bomber with the RAF in late 1942. Designated PV-1 by the United States Navy (US Navy), it entered combat in 1943 in the Pacific. The bomber was also used by the United States Army Air Forces (USAAF), which designated it the Lockheed B-34 (Lexington) and B-37 as a trainer. British Commonwealth forces also used it in several roles, including antishipping and antisubmarine search and attack.

The Ventura was developed from the Lockheed Model 18 Lodestar transport, as a replacement for the Lockheed Hudson bombers then in service with the Royal Air Force. Used in daylight attacks against occupied Europe, they proved to have weaknesses and were removed from bomber duty. Some were later used for patrols by Coastal Command.

After USAAF monopolization of land-based bombers was removed, the US Navy ordered a revised design which entered service as the PV-2 Harpoon for anti-submarine work.

== Development ==
=== Lockheed Ventura/B-34 Lexington ===
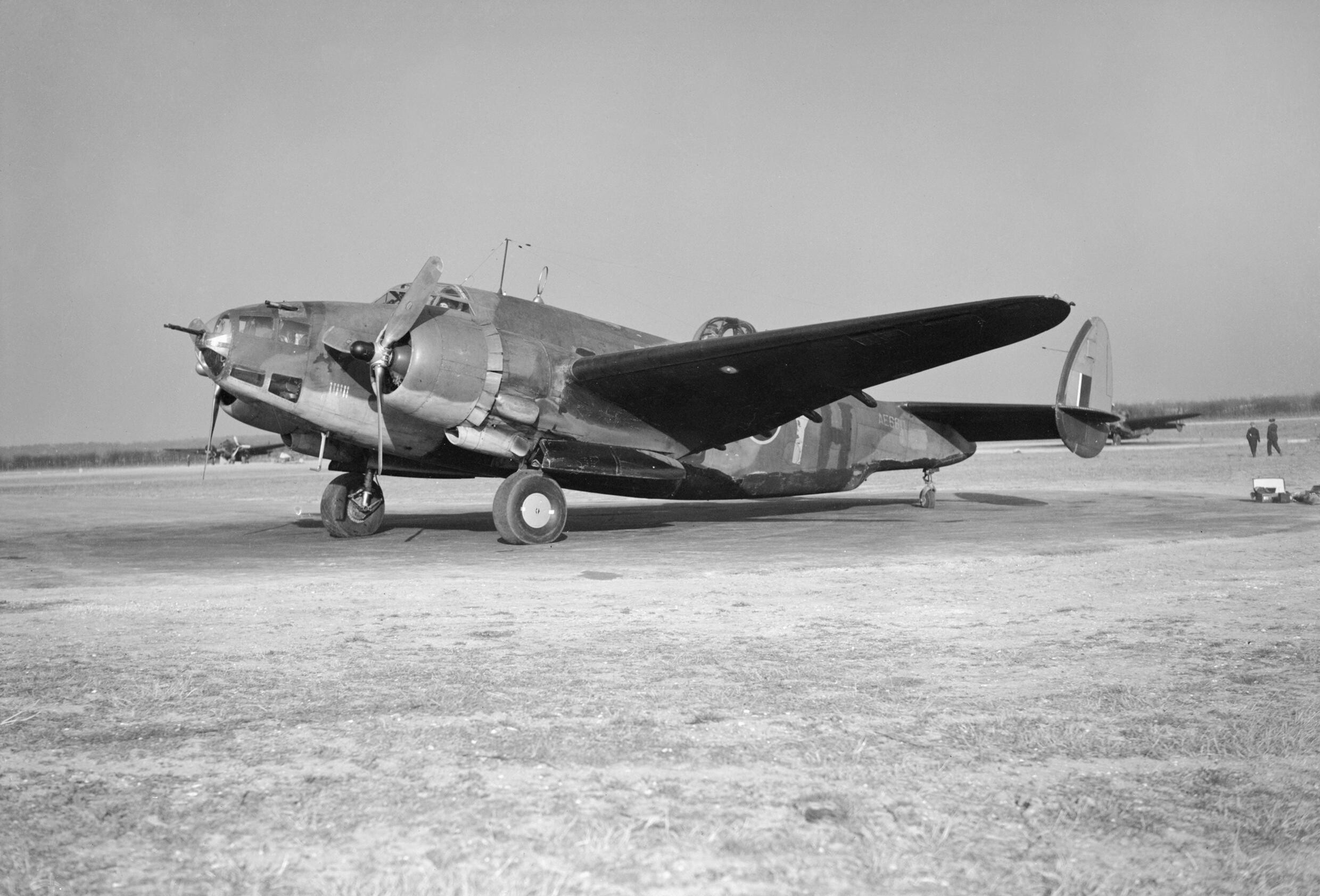
An RAF Ventura Mk 1

At the start of the war, Lockheed proposed military conversions of the Lodestar for the RAF as replacement for the Hudson reconnaissance aircraft and the Bristol Blenheim bomber. The first British order was placed in February 1940 for 25 Model 32 as bombers. This was followed by an order for 300 Model 37 with Double Wasp engines, then for a further 375 later in 1940. Lockheed needed more production capacity and transferred the production line to its Vega Aircraft Corporation light aircraft subsidiary, part of Lockheed's factory complex at the Lockheed Air Terminal in Burbank, California.

The Ventura was very similar to its predecessor, the Lockheed Hudson. The primary difference was not in layout but rather, the Ventura was slightly larger, heavier, and used more powerful engines than the Hudson. Visually the most prominent change was the addition of gunner under the rear fuselage which added a visible step, while the rows of windows along the fuselage were deleted, and the tailplane was raised slightly. The RAF ordered 188 Venturas in February 1940, which were delivered from mid-1942. Venturas were initially used for daylight raids on occupied Europe but, like some other RAF bombers, they proved too vulnerable without fighter escort, which was difficult to provide for long-range missions. Venturas were replaced by the faster de Havilland Mosquito. The Venturas were transferred to patrol duties with Coastal Command as the Mosquito replaced them in bomber squadrons; 30 went to the Royal Canadian Air Force (RCAF) and some to the South African Air Force (SAAF). The RAF placed an order for 487 Ventura Mark IIs but many of these were diverted to the USAAF, which placed its own order for 200 Ventura Mark IIA as the B-34 Lexington, later renamed RB-34.

=== Lockheed B-37 ===
In August 1941, large orders for Venturas were placed with Lend-Lease Act money. Among the orders were for 550 armed reconnaissance versions of the Ventura. This aircraft was originally planned to be built under the designation O-56. The main differences between the Ventura and the O-56 were in the engines: rather than the 2,000 hp (1,491 kW) Pratt & Whitney R-2800 radials of the Ventura, the O-56 used 1,700 hp (1,270 kW) Wright R-2600-13 radials.

Before completion of the first O-56, the U.S. Army Air Forces dropped the "O-" category used to designate "observation" (reconnaissance) aircraft. The O-56 was redesignated the RB-34B (the R denoted 'restricted' meaning it was not to be used for combat). Before the first of these flew, the design was redesignated again as the B-37 with a higher powered version of the R-2600, later it also was designated the RB-37.

While 550 were ordered by the Army Air Forces, acquisition by the USAAF stopped after only 18 Venturas were accepted, when the Army Air Forces agreed to turn over exclusive use of the Ventura to the United States Navy.

=== PV-1 Ventura ===
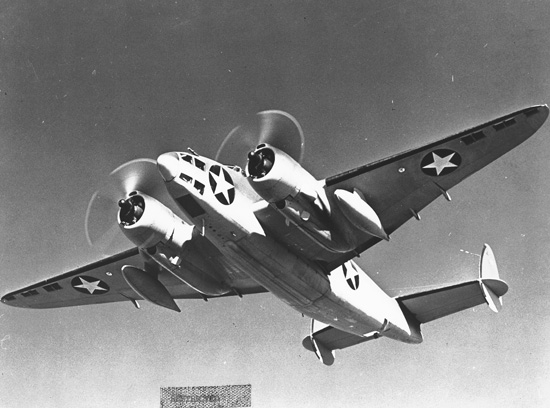
A PV-1 Ventura

The PV-1 Ventura, built by the Vega Aircraft Company division of Lockheed (hence the "V" Navy manufacturer's letter that later replaced the "O" for Lockheed), was a version of the Ventura built for the U.S. Navy (see Venturas in U.S. Navy service below). The main differences between the PV-1 and the B-34 were the inclusion of special equipment in the PV-1, adapting it to its patrol bombing role. The maximum fuel capacity of the PV-1 was increased from 1,345 gal (5,081 L) to 1,607 gal (6,082 L), to increase its range; the forward defensive armament was also reduced for this reason. The most important addition was of an ASD-1 search radar.

Early production PV-1s still carried a bombardier's station behind the nose radome, with four side windows and a flat bomb-aiming panel underneath the nose. Late production PV-1s dispensed with this bombardier position and replaced it with a pack with three 0.50 inch (12.7 mm) machine guns underneath the nose. These aircraft could also carry eight 5-inch (127 mm) HVAR rockets on launchers underneath the wings.

The PV-1 began to be delivered in December 1942, and entered service in February 1943. The first squadron in combat was VP-135, deployed in the Aleutian Islands in April 1943. They were operated by three other squadrons in this theatre. From the Aleutians, they flew strikes against bases in Paramushiro and Shimushu, Japanese islands in the Kurile chain. Often, PV-1s would lead B-24 bomber formations, since they were equipped with radar. In late 1943, some PV-1s were deployed to the Solomon Islands as night fighters with VMF(N)-531, a Marine Corps fighter squadron. In the Atlantic theater, U.S. Navy land-based patrol squadrons deployed the aircraft on anti-submarine duties. Beginning in September 1943, Patrol Bombing Squadron 127 (VPB-127) operated PV-1 Venturas from Naval Air Facility Port Lyautey in French Morocco, conducting convoy escort and anti-submarine patrols around the Straits of Gibraltar.

=== PV-2 Harpoon ===
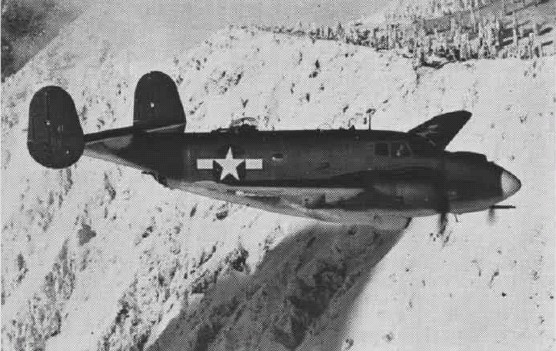
A PV-2 Harpoon in flight in 1945

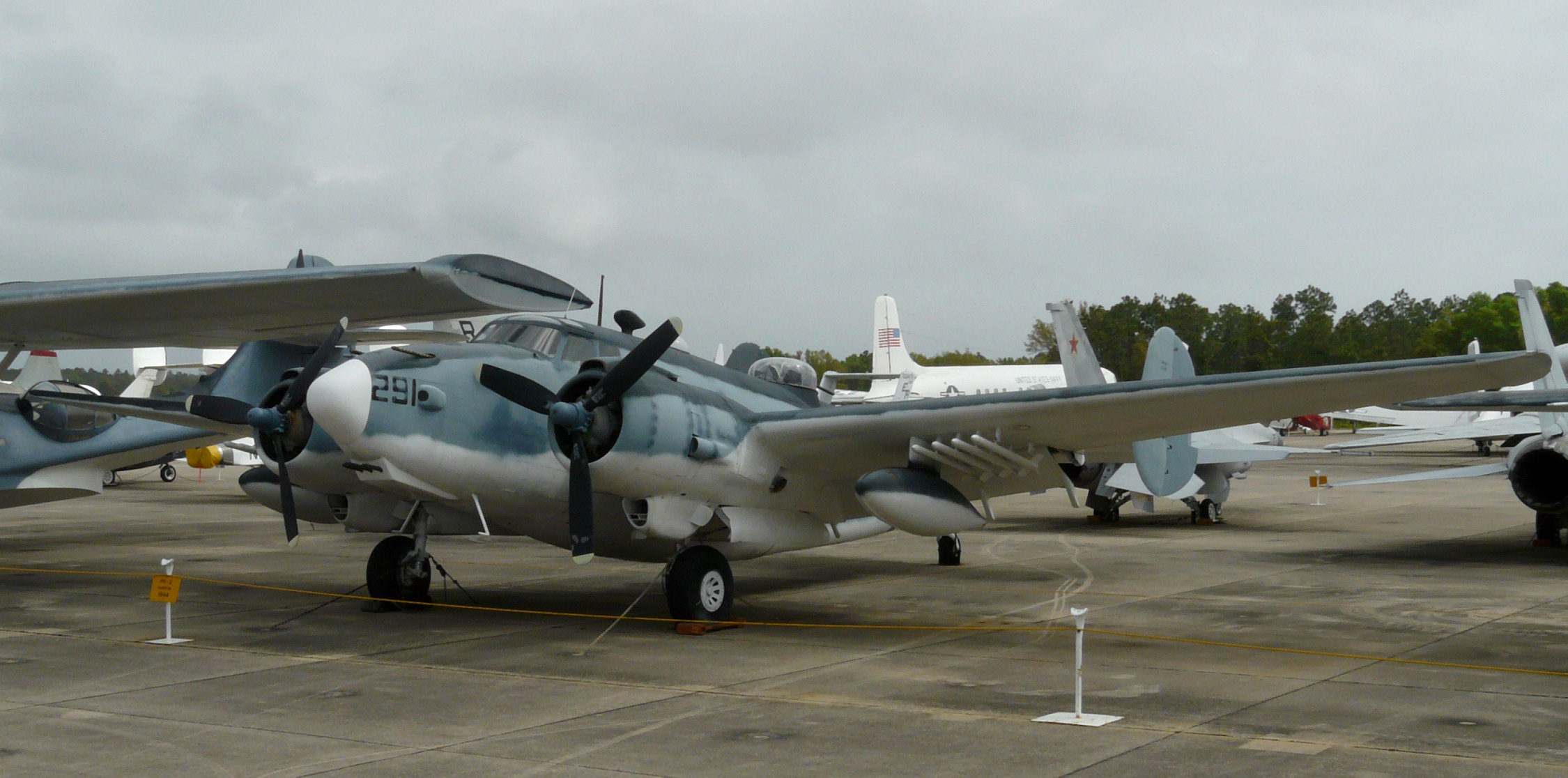
PV-2 Harpoon at the National Naval Aviation Museum at Naval Air Station Pensacola in 2008

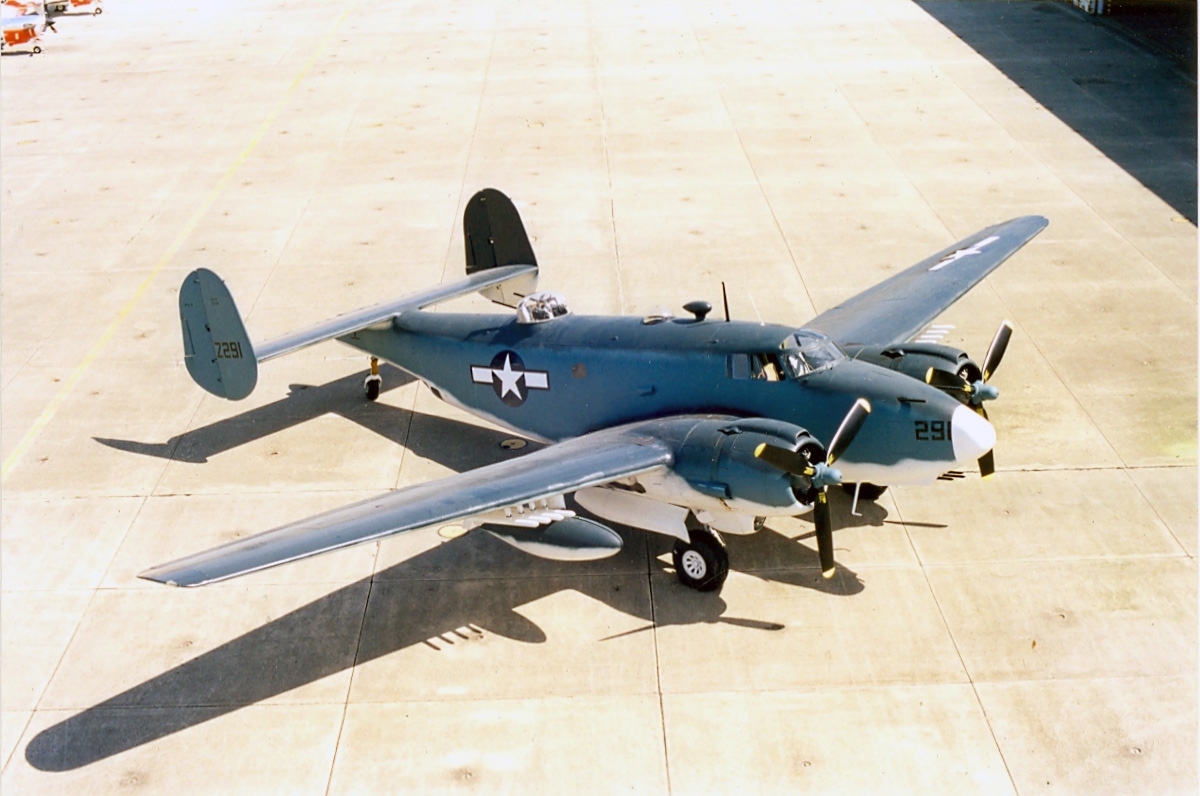
PV-2 Harpoon at the National Naval Aviation Museum at Naval Air Station Pensacola in 2009

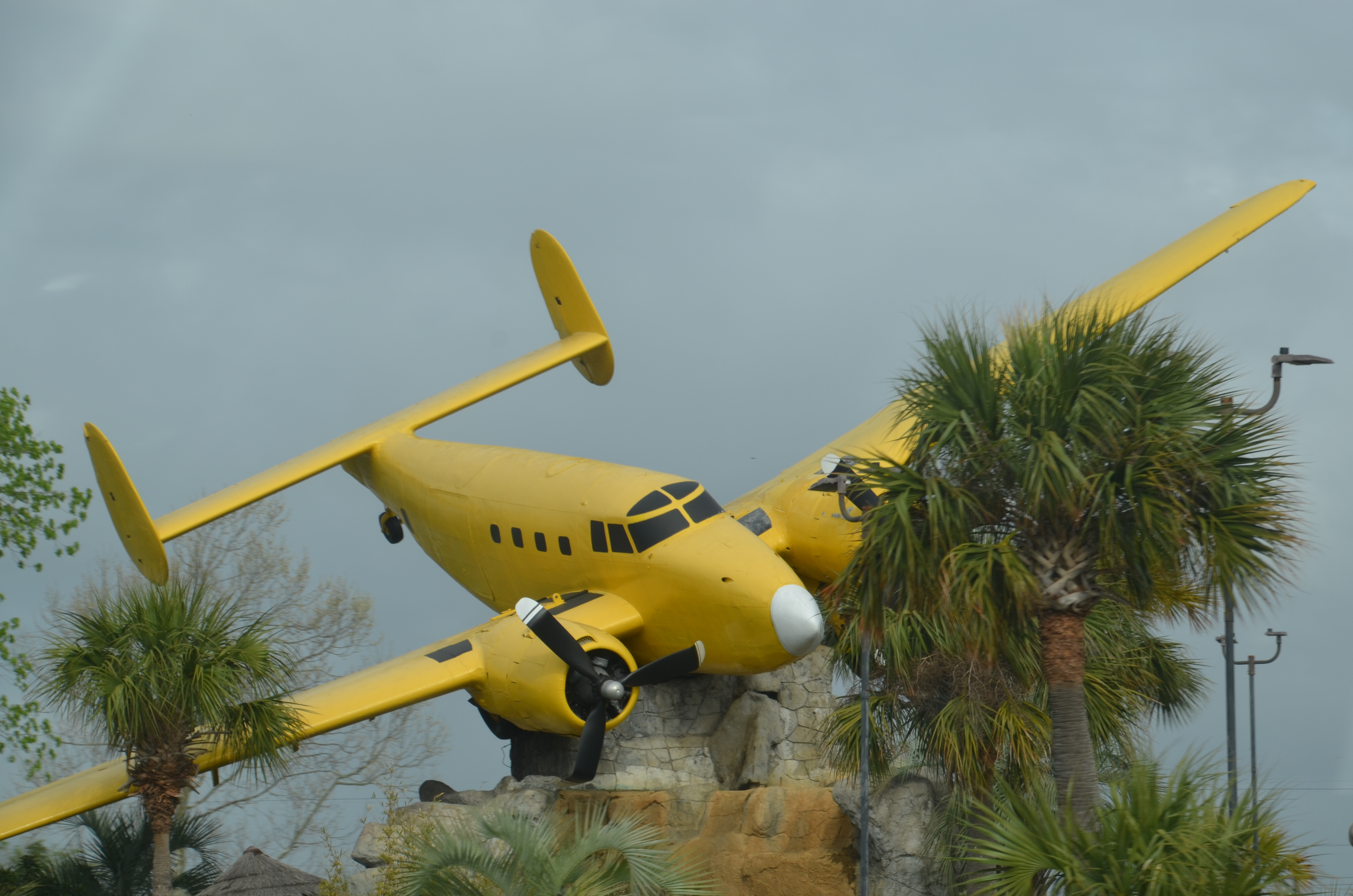
PV-2 Harpoon repainted and on display at a miniature golf course in North Myrtle Beach, South Carolina in 2024

The PV-2 Harpoon was a major redesign of the Ventura with the wing area increased from 551 ft^{2} (51.2 m^{2}) to 686 ft^{2} (63.7 m^{2}) giving an increased load-carrying capability, and which first flew on 3 December 1943. The motivation for redesign was weaknesses in the PV-1, which had shown itself to have problems in taking off when carrying a full load of fuel. On the PV-2, the armament became standardized at five forward-firing machine guns. Many early PV-1s had a bombardier's position, which was deleted in the PV-2. Some other significant developments included the increase of the bombload by 30% to 4,000 lb (1,800 kg), and the ability to carry eight 5-inch (127 mm) HVAR rockets under the wings.

While the PV-2 was expected to have increased range and better takeoff, the anticipated speed statistics were projected lower than those of the PV-1, due to the use of the same engines but an increase in weight. The Navy ordered 500 examples, designating them with the popular name Harpoon.

Early tests indicated a tendency for the wings to wrinkle dangerously. As this problem could not be solved by a 6 ft (1.8 m) reduction in wingspan (making the wing uniformly flexible), a complete redesign of the wing was necessitated. This hurdle delayed entry of the PV-2 into service. The PV-2s already delivered were used for training purposes under the designation PV-2C. By the end of 1944, only 69 PV-2s had been delivered. They finally resumed when the redesign was complete. The first aircraft shipped were the PV-2D, which had eight forward-firing machine guns and was used in ground attacks. When World War II ended, all of the order was cancelled.

With the wing problems fixed, the PV-2 proved reliable, and eventually popular. It was first used in the Aleutians by VP-139, one of the squadrons that originally used the PV-1. It was used by a number of countries after the war's end, but the United States ceased ordering new PV-2s, and they were all soon retired from service.

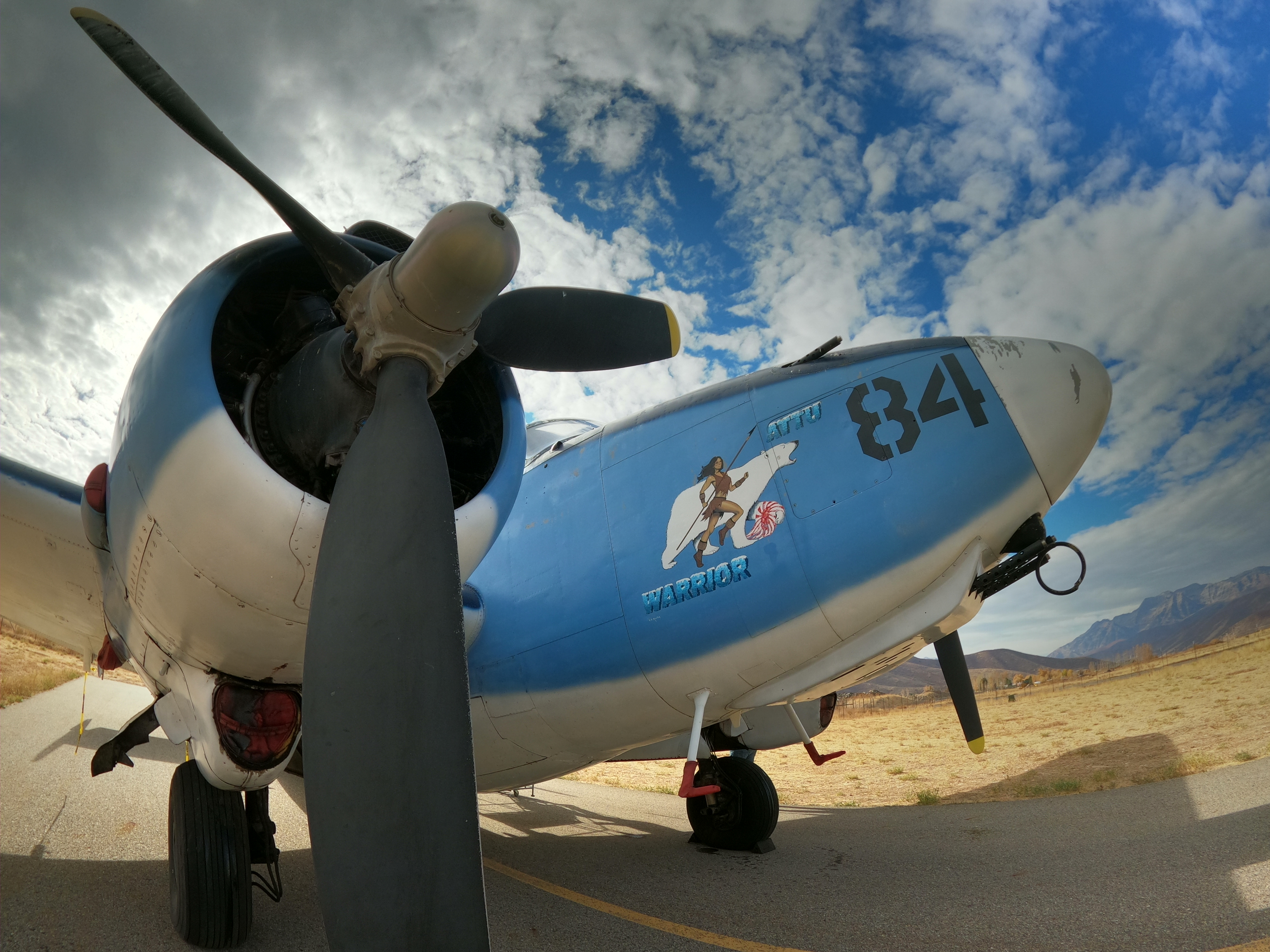
PV-2 Harpoon

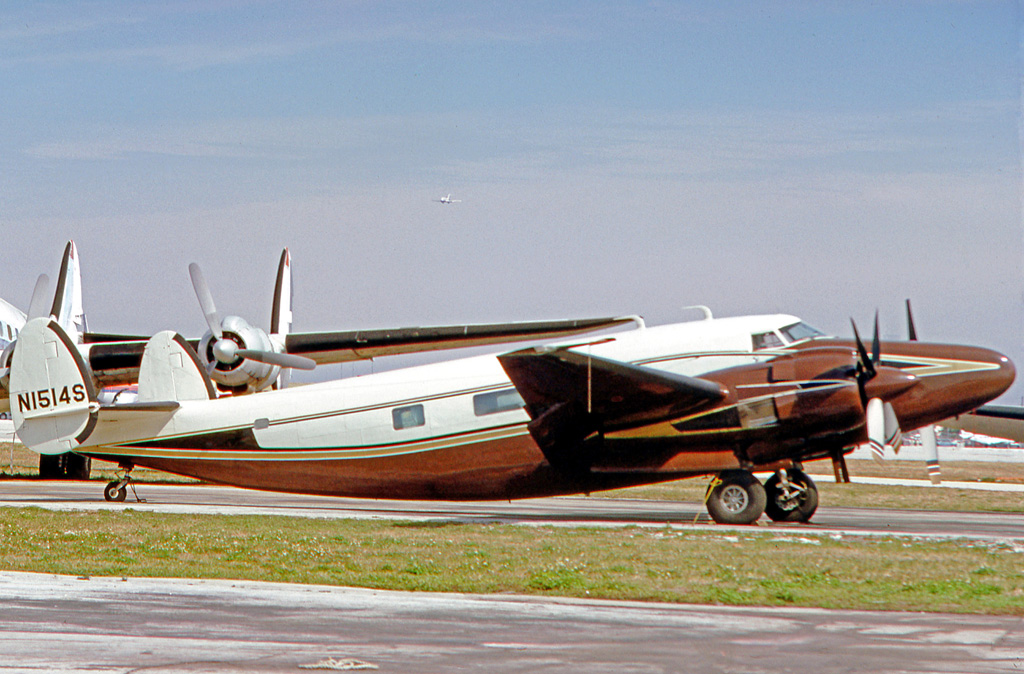
Howard 350 executive conversion of the PV-1. The aircraft was destroyed in a fatal accident near Fort Lauderdale in May 1979, 15 months after this photograph was taken.

Ex-military PV-1 Venturas from Canada and South Africa were converted by Howard Aero in San Antonio, Texas, in the 1950s and 1960s as high-speed executive transports. The earliest conversions, called Super Venturas, incorporated a 48 in (122 cm) fuselage stretch, extra fuel tankage, large picture windows, luxury interiors, and weapons bays transformed into baggage compartments. The landing gear was swapped for the heavier-duty units from the PV-2. Later conversions, of which eighteen were completed in the 1960s, were called Howard 350s.

At least nineteen PV-1s were further modified, including cabin pressurization under the designation Howard 500. A final PV-1 modification by Howard was the Eldorado 700, with longer wings, a pointed nose, and streamlined engine cowlings.

A notable crash of a civilian version occurred on 17 December 1954, killing four, including Fred Miller, president of the Miller Brewing Company and grandson of founder Frederick Miller. The company plane was bound for Winnipeg, Manitoba, but had trouble with both engines and crashed shortly after takeoff from Mitchell Field in Milwaukee, Wisconsin. Also killed were his oldest son, 20-year-old Fred, Jr., and the two company pilots, Joseph and Paul Laird.

Oakland Airmotive (later Bay Aviation Services, based in Oakland, California) also offered a PV-2 executive aircraft conversion dubbed Centaurus starting in 1958. The cost of the conversion was $155,000 in addition to the airframe.

== Operational history ==
=== Portuguese Air Force ===
The Portuguese Air Force received 42 Lockheed PV-2C Harpoons from 1953, which replaced the Curtiss SB2C-5 Helldiver as an anti-submarine aircraft. The Harpoons equipped squadrons 61 and 62 at the Montijo Air Base. In 1960, the Harpoons were replaced as maritime patrol and anti-submarine aircraft by Lockheed P2V-5 Neptunes. The remaining Harpoons were sent to Angola and Mozambique, where they formed Squadron 91 operating from Luanda Air Base and Squadron 101 from Beira Air Base. The Harpoons were used on operations in the Angolan and Mozambican theatres of the Portuguese Overseas War (1961–1974). They served mainly as light bombers and ground attack aircraft, with occasional reconnaissance, transport and maritime patrol sorties. The last Portuguese Harpoons were retired in 1975. The Museu do Ar (Portuguese Air Museum) has what is believed to be the only remaining Lockheed PV-2C Harpoon in Europe.

=== Royal Air Force ===
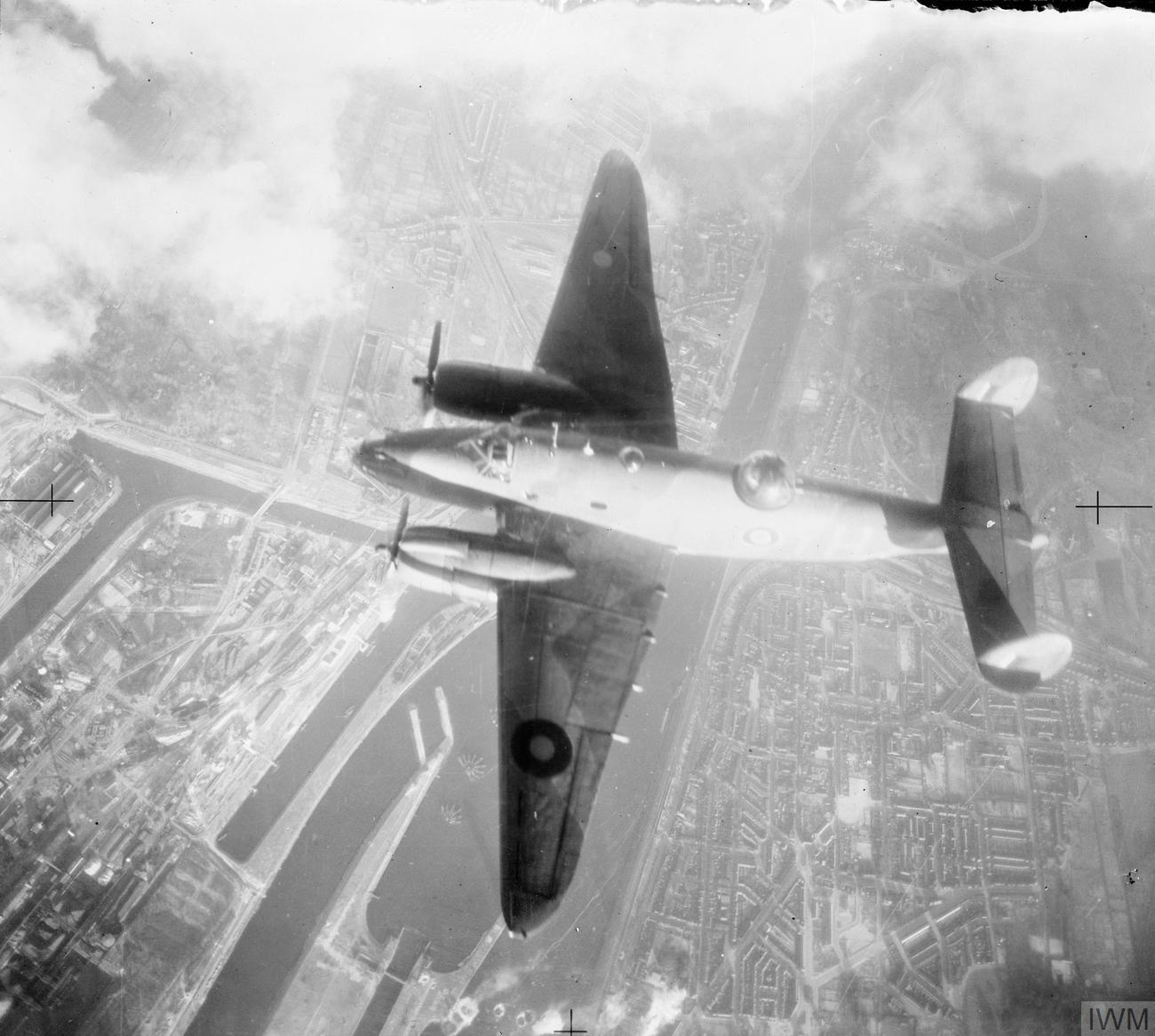
A No. 21 Squadron RAF Ventura attacking Ijmuiden, February 1943.

The first Ventura Mark Is were accepted by the Royal Air Force (RAF) in September 1941, with aircraft being delivered to Britain from April 1942. By the end of August, enough Venturas had arrived to equip No. 21 Squadron RAF, No. 487 Squadron RNZAF and No. 464 Squadron RAAF. The Ventura flew its first operational mission for the RAF on 3 November 1942, when three Venturas of 21 Squadron attacked railway targets near Hengelo in the Netherlands. On 6 December 1942, 47 Venturas from 21, 464 (RAAF) and 487 (RNZAF) squadrons participated in Operation Oyster, the large daylight 2 Group raid against the Philips radio and vacuum tube factories at Eindhoven. Also committed to the raid were 36 Bostons and 10 de Havilland Mosquitos.

Carrying incendiaries, they were placed in the third wave of aircraft, and suffered the highest rate of loss. Nine of the 47 Venturas were shot down and many others were damaged by flak or bird strikes. The force also lost four Bostons and one Mosquito. Six months later, on 3 May 1943, Venturas of 487 Squadron RNZAF were sent on Operation Ramrod 16, an attack on a power station in Amsterdam. The squadron was told that the target was of such importance to Dutch morale, that the attack was to be continued regardless of opposition. Significant problems developed with rendezvousing with the escorting fighters, with the result that all 10 Venturas that crossed the coast were lost to German fighters. Squadron Leader Leonard Trent (later the last of the Great Escapers) won the Victoria Cross for his leadership in this raid.

The Ventura was never very popular among RAF crews. Although it was 50 mph (80 km/h) faster and carried more than twice the bomb load of its predecessor, the Hudson, it proved unsatisfactory as a bomber. By the summer of 1943, the Ventura had been replaced by the de Havilland Mosquito. The last Ventura raid was flown by 21 Squadron on 9 September 1943. Some Venturas were modified to be used by Coastal Command as the Ventura G.R.I. and 387 PV-1s were used by the RAF as the Ventura G.R.V in the Mediterranean and by Coastal Command. Some RAF aircraft were modified into Ventura C.V transport aircraft. A small number of Venturas were also used in other air forces, including the RCAF, RNZAF and SAAF.

=== Royal Australian Air Force ===
In the United Kingdom, No. 464 Squadron RAAF formed (mixture of Commonwealth personnel) at RAF Feltwell in September 1942 to operate the Ventura as part of 2 Group, Bomber Command; it converted to the de Havilland Mosquito in September 1943. In the Mediterranean, No. 459 Squadron RAAF was equipped with the Ventura V between December 1943 to July 1944, flying mainly anti-submarine and anti-shipping patrols.

In Australia, 55 PV-1s were supplied to the RAAF for use in the South West Pacific Area. No. 13 Squadron RAAF was the only operational squadron in Australia equipped with the Ventura. It operated primarily in north-eastern Queensland and then the Northern Territory, and later serving in the Borneo campaign of 1945. After the war, the squadron used its aircraft to help transport liberated prisoners of war.

=== Royal Canadian Air Force ===
The RCAF used 157 Ventura G.R. Mk.Vs operationally from 16 June 1942 to 18 April 1947 in the coastal patrol role in both Eastern and Western Air Command with 8, 113, 115, 145, and 149 Squadrons. 1 Central Flying School, Trenton, Ontario, and RCAF Station Pennfield Ridge, New Brunswick (RAF No. 34 Operational Training Unit) used 21 Ventura Mk. Is and 108 Ventura Mk.IIs, IIAs and IIIs for training with the BCATP, as well as some converted Mk.Vs used as target tugs. All earlier marks were sold off by late 1947, while some Mk.Vs remained in use until the late 1950s. The RCAF operated 286 Venturas.

=== South African Air Force ===
The SAAF also received some 135 PV-1s, which were used to protect shipping around the Cape of Good Hope and to bomb Italian shipping in the Mediterranean. In December 1942 four SAAF Venturas dropped supplies to survivors of the Dunedin Star shipwreck on South-West Africa's Skeleton Coast. Venturas served in the South African Air Force until 1960.

=== Soviet Air Force ===
A few US Navy PV-1s force-landed in the Soviet Union after attacking Japanese targets on the Kurile islands and were impounded. Some of them were repaired and pressed into service by the Soviet Air Force where the type became known as the B-34. By December 1944, eight planes were located on airfields on Kamchatka: four were fully airworthy, three were undergoing repairs and one was a write-off.

By 1945 seven PV-1s (five of them being airworthy) were used by the Soviets, one plane was the personal liaison aircraft of Ltc M.A. Yeryomin. The planes were used during the Soviet-Japanese campaign in August 1945. After the end of the war only one aircraft remained in service.

=== Royal New Zealand Air Force ===
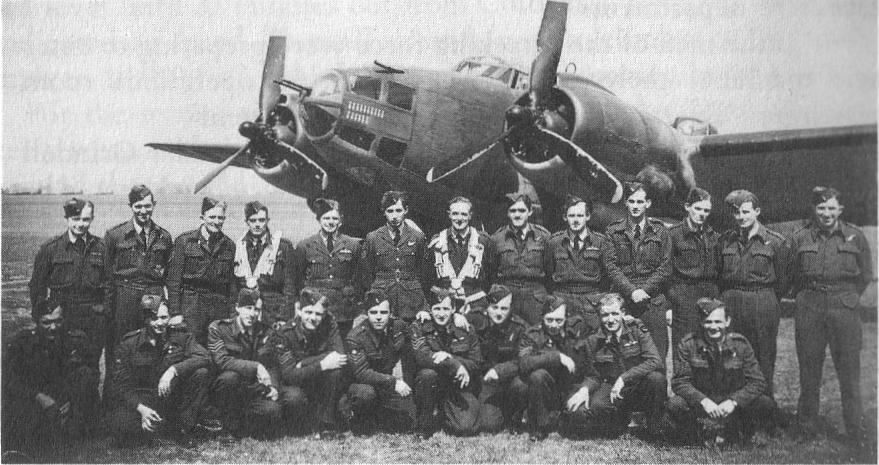
487 Squadron NCOs at RAF Methwold early 1943

From August 1942, 487 Squadron RNZAF, (operating in Europe as part of the RAF), was equipped with the type, although losses (including on 3 May 1943 the loss of all 11 aircraft attacking Amsterdam), led to their replacement with the de Havilland Mosquito in June.

The Royal New Zealand Air Force in the Pacific received 139 Venturas and some Harpoons from June 1943 to replace Lockheed Hudsons in the maritime patrol bomber and medium bomber roles. Initially Venturas were unpopular with the RNZAF due to rumoured poor performance on one engine, the fate of Squadron Leader Leonard Trent VC of 487 Squadron (above) as well as the failure of the U.S. to provide New Zealand with promised B-24 Liberators. Despite that the RNZAF Venturas came to be among the most widely used of any nation's, seeing substantial action until VJ Day over South West Pacific islands.

The first 19 RB-34s that arrived by sea from the U.S. in June had much equipment either missing or damaged. Six airworthy machines were hurriedly produced by cannibalization and sent into action with No. 3 Squadron RNZAF in Fiji. On 26 June the first PV-1s were flown to Whenuapai and No. 1 Squadron RNZAF was able to convert to 18 of these by 1 August, then replacing the mixed 3 Squadron in action at Henderson Field, Guadalcanal in late October.

By this time No. 2 Squadron RNZAF at Ohakea and No. 9 Squadron RNZAF were also using the type. The following year No. 4 Squadron RNZAF and No. 8 Squadron RNZAF also received Venturas. Some squadrons were retained on garrison duty while others followed the allied advance to Emirau and Green Island and to New Britain. RNZAF Venturas were tasked with routine patrols, anti-shipping strikes, minelaying, bombing and strafing missions, air-sea rescue patrols, and photographic reconnaissance missions.

RNZAF machines often clashed with Japanese fighters, notably during an air-sea rescue patrol on Christmas Eve 1943. NZ4509 was attacked by nine Japanese single-engine fighters over St. George's Channel. It shot down three, later confirmed, and claimed two others as probable, although it suffered heavy damage in the action. The pilot, Flying Officer D. Ayson and navigator, Warrant Officer W. Williams, were awarded the DFC. The dorsal turret gunner Flight Sergeant G. Hannah was awarded the DFM.

By late 1944 the Ventura began to be phased out of frontline action as the RNZAF backed away from the Patrol Bomber concept, orders for PV-2 Harpoons were canceled after a handful of aircraft had been delivered. At VJ Day only 30 PV-1 aircraft remained on the front-line with No. 3 Squadron at Jacquinot Bay.

Planned re-equipment with de Havilland Mosquitos did not take place until after the cessation of hostilities. The last Ventura unit was No. 2 Squadron, which continued to operate PV-1 and PV-2 aircraft on meteorological duty until 1948. A restored RNZAF RB-34 (NZ4600) is owned by the Museum of Transport and Technology in Auckland.

=== United States Army Air Forces ===
Some 264 Ventura Mark IIs ordered by the RAF were transferred to the U.S. Army Air Force. Though some were used as anti-submarine patrol bombers under the designation B-34 Lexington, most were used for training with various stateside units. Twenty-seven of these were used by the U.S. Navy for anti-submarine patrols as well; these were designated PV-1 Ventura and PV-2 Harpoon.

=== United States Navy ===
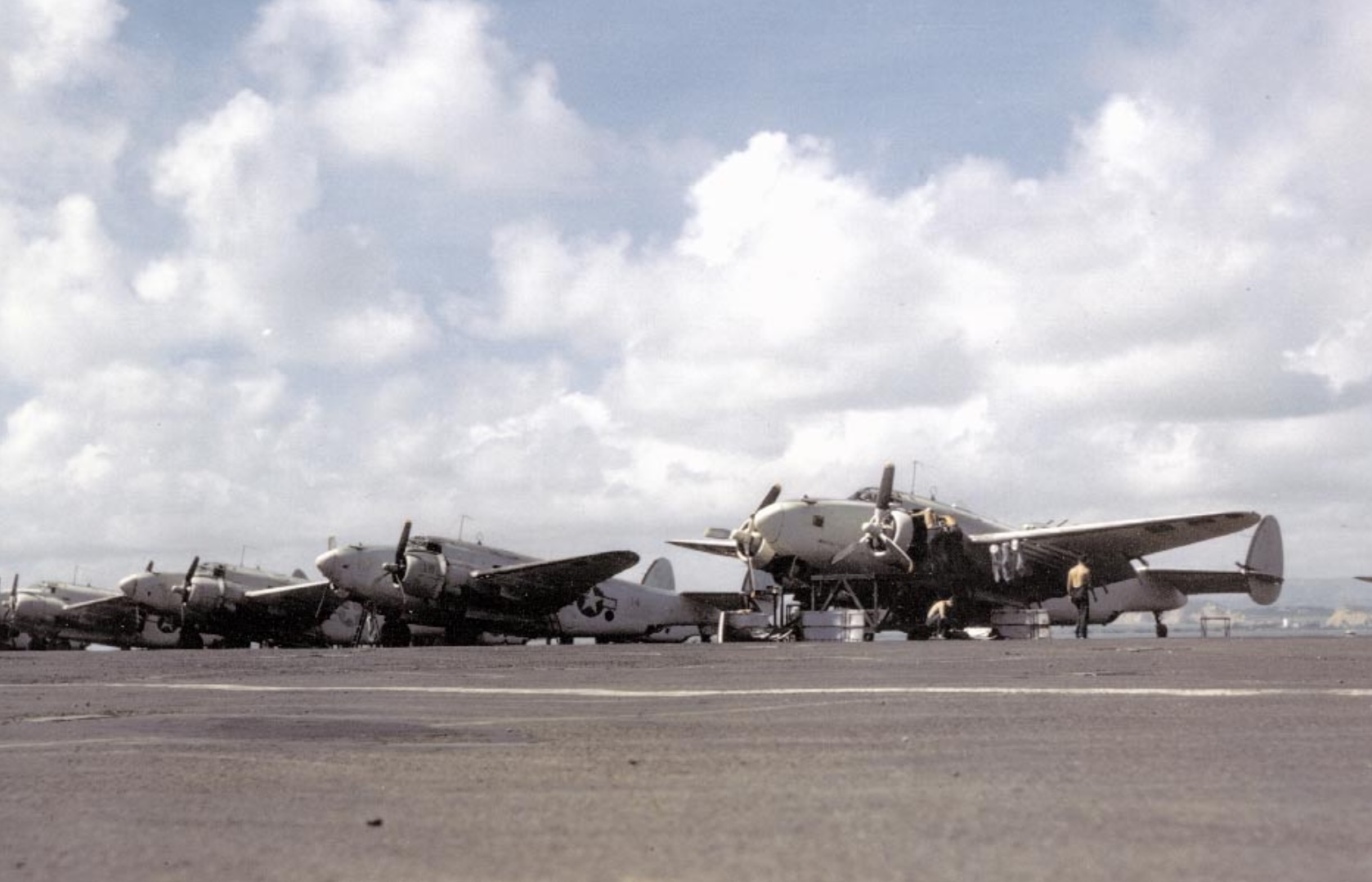
PV-1s of VPB-147 in the Caribbean in 1944.

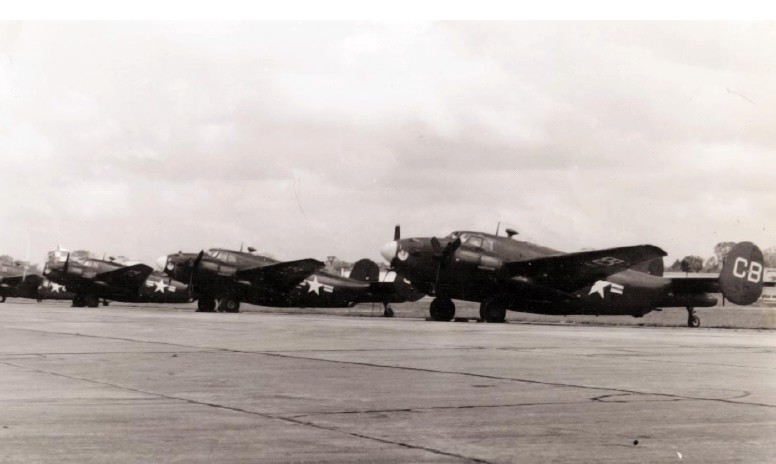
PV-2s of VPB-136 at Naval Air Station Whidbey Island, c.1945–46

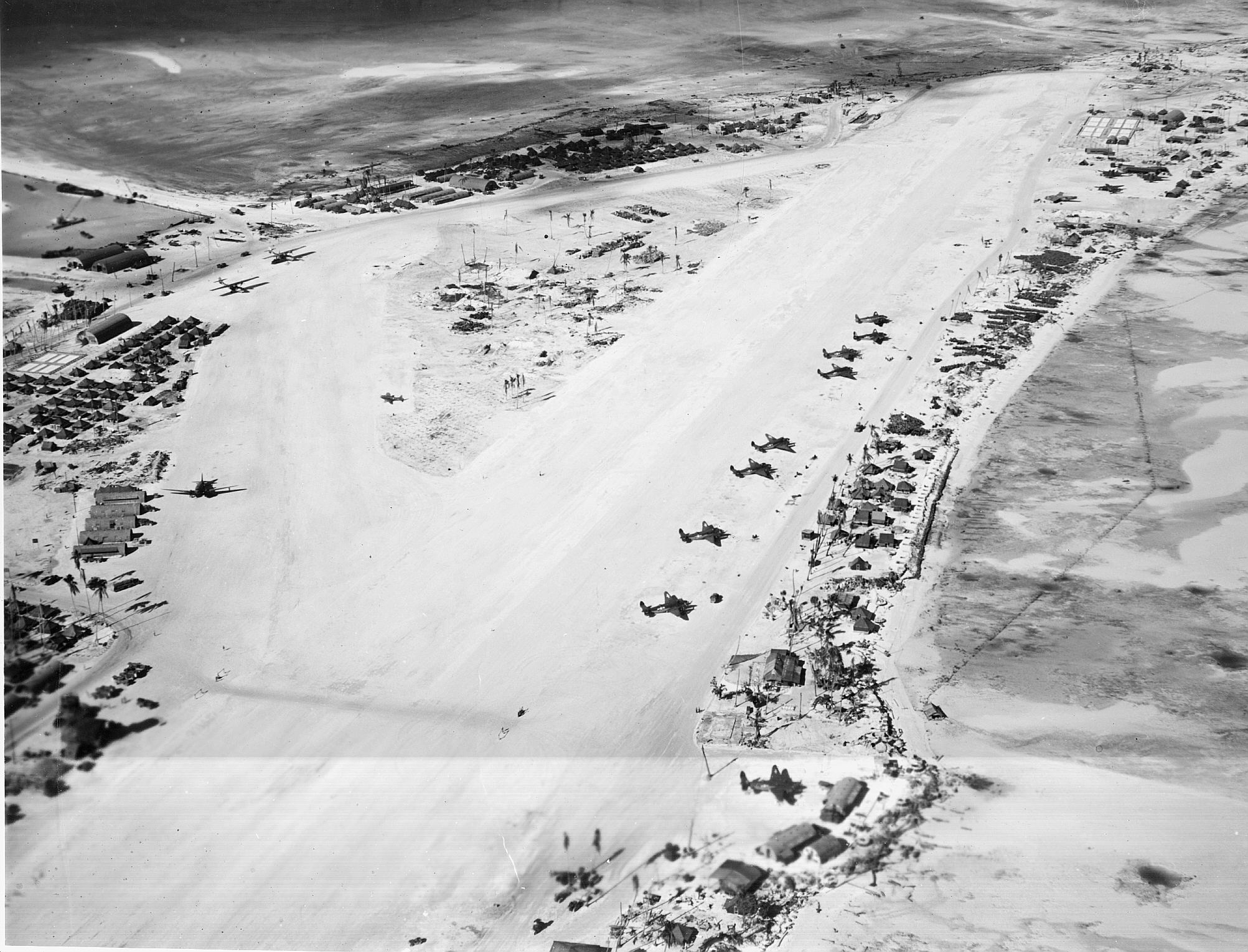
Long range aircraft at Hawkins Field (Tarawa), March 1944

During the early months of 1942, the primary responsibility for anti-submarine warfare in the United States was shouldered by the Army Air Forces. This irked the Navy, as it considered this region of battle its burden. To carry out such a task, the Navy was pursuing a long-range, land-based patrol and reconnaissance aircraft with a substantial bomb load. This goal was always resisted by the Army Air Forces, which carefully protected its monopoly on land-based bombing. This forced the navy to use long-range floatplanes for these roles. The Navy was unable to upgrade to more capable aircraft until the Army Air Forces needed the Navy plant in Renton, Washington to manufacture its Boeing B-29 Superfortress. In exchange for use of the Renton plant, the Army Air Forces would discontinue its objections to Naval land-based bombers, and provide aircraft to the Navy. One of the clauses of this agreement stated that production of the B-34 and B-37 by Lockheed would cease, and instead these resources would be directed at building a navalized version, the PV-1 Ventura.

The PV-1 began to be delivered in December 1942, and entered service in February 1943. The first squadron in combat was VP-135, deployed in the Aleutian Islands in April 1943. They were operated by three other squadrons in this theatre. From the Aleutians, they flew strikes against Paramushiro, a Japanese island. Often, PV-1s would lead B-24 bomber formations, since they were equipped with radar. In late 1943, PV-1s were deployed to the Solomon Islands and to the newly captured field at Tarawa in the Gilbert Islands. After the war, the U.S. Navy deemed many PV-1s obsolete and the aircraft were sent to Naval Air Station Clinton, Oklahoma to be demilitarized and reduced to scrap.

=== Other operators ===
- Brazil (15 Venturas, 5 Harpoons)
- Italy (22 Harpoons)
- Japan (17 Harpoons)
- Netherlands (18 Harpoons)
- Peru (6 Harpoons)

== Variants ==
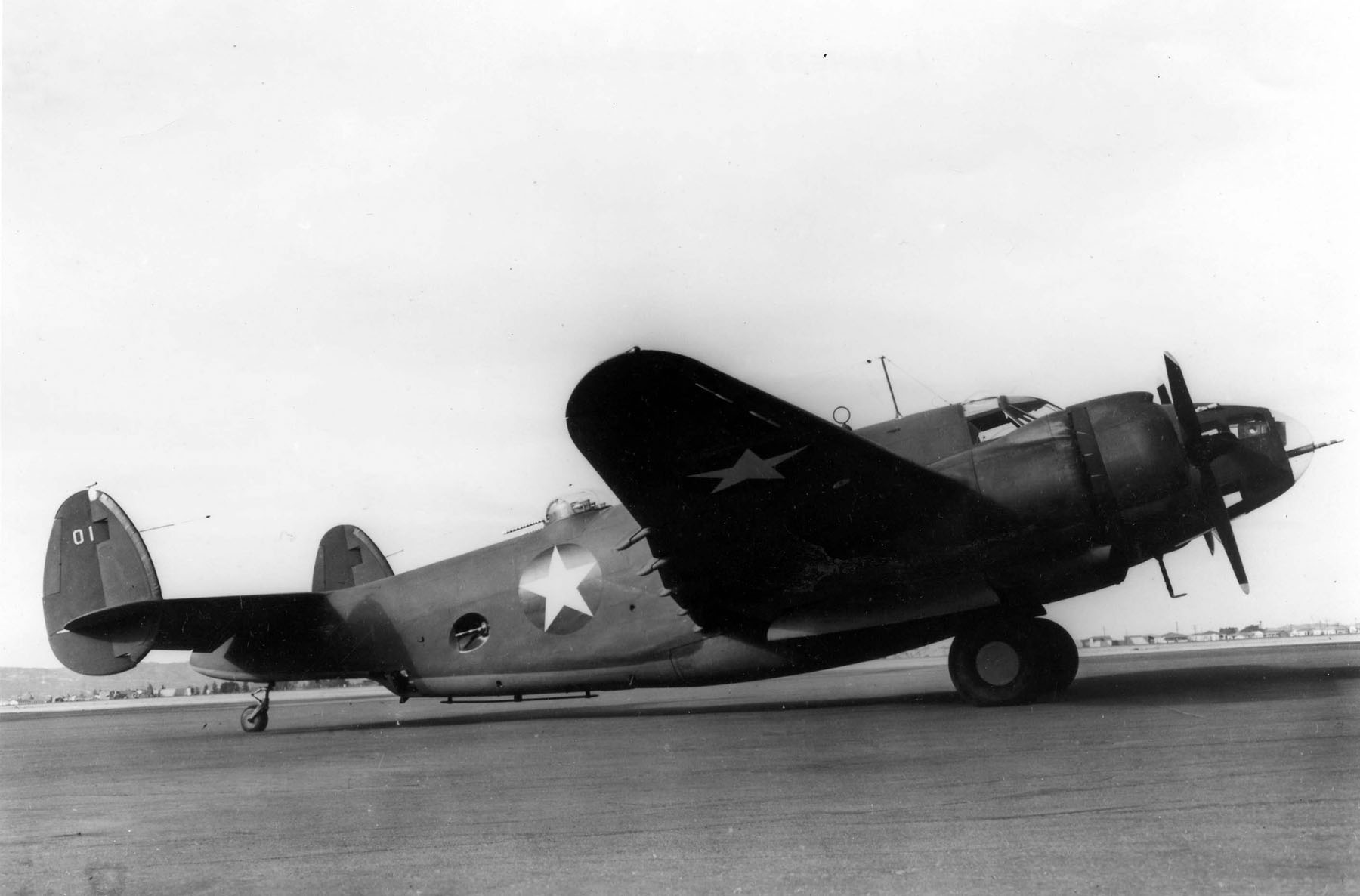
One of 18 USAAF B-37s, 1943.

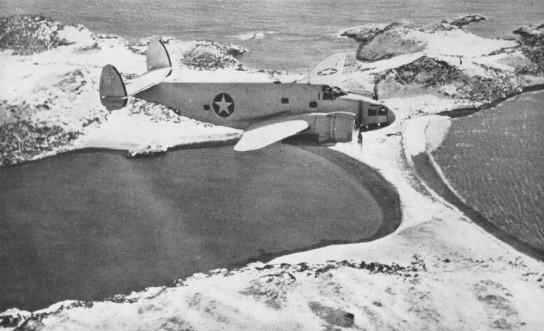
A PV-3 in early 1943. It was assigned in October 1942 to VP-82 which operated from Naval Air Station Argentia, Newfoundland on anti-submarine patrols over the Atlantic.

B-34
US designation for the Model 137 (with 2000hp R-2800-31 engines) bought for the Royal Air Force, 200 built and designated the Ventura IIA by the British.
B-34A
Former Royal Air Force Venturas returned to USAAF under a reverse lend-lease.
B-34B
B-34As converted as navigation trainers.
B-37
Lockheed Model 437 for the USAAF (with 1700hp R-2600-13 engines), only 18 out of an order of 550 built for armed observation. Originally designated the O-56, it was later designated the RB-37.
PV-1
United States Navy version of the B-34; 1,600 built. A total of 388 were delivered to the Royal Air Force as the Ventura GR.V, others to the RAAF, RNZAF and SAAF.
PV-1P
Designation for PV-1s fitted with a camera installation.
PV-2 Harpoon
Updated model with larger fin and wing area; 470 built.
PV-2C
Modified version of the PV-2 used for training; 30 built.
PV-2D
Same as PV-2 but with eight 0.5in nose guns; 35 built.
PV-2T
Designation for PV-2s used for crew training.
PV-3
Twenty-seven former RAF Ventura IIs requisitioned by the USN.
Ventura I
R-2800-S1A4-G powered variant for the Royal Air Force; 188 built, 30 to the RCAF and some to the SAAF, later re-designated the Ventura GR.I.
Ventura II
R-2800-31 powered variant for the RAF, 487 built, some transferred to the USAAC and USN.
Ventura IIA
British designation for the B-34.
Ventura V
British designation for the PV-1, later designated Ventura GR.V.

== Operators ==
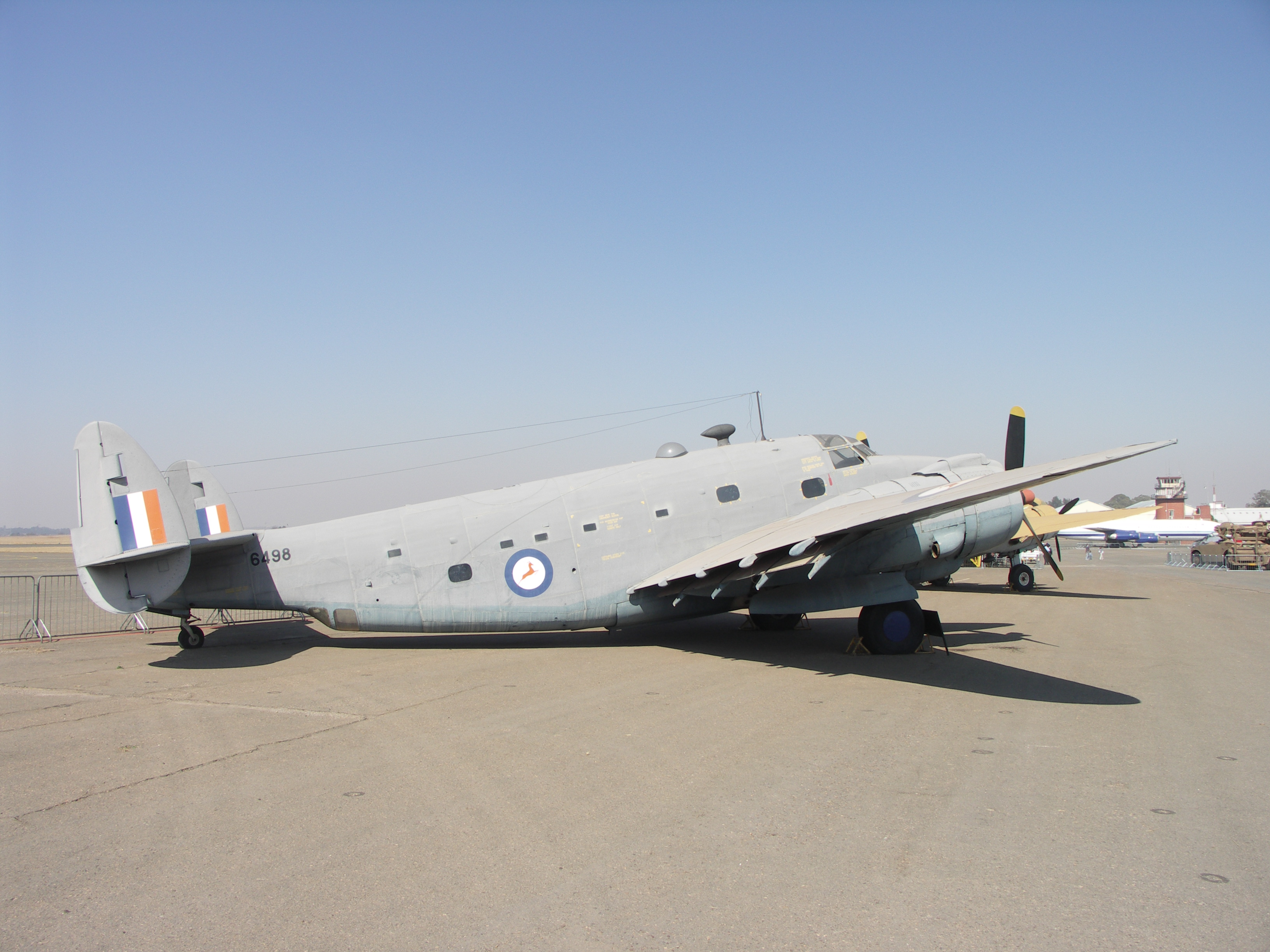
Retired PV-1 at the SAAF Museum

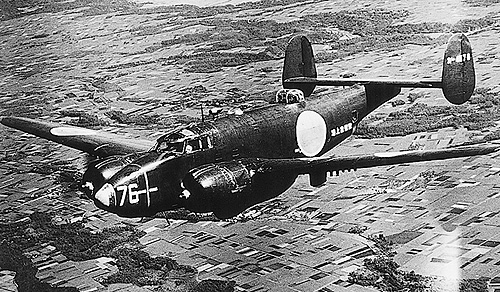
Japan Maritime Self-Defense Force PV-2

Australia

- Royal Australian Air Force 75 aircraft, 1943–1946
  - No. 13 Squadron RAAF
  - No. 459 Squadron RAAF
  - No. 464 Squadron RAAF

Brazil

- Brazilian Air Force 20 aircraft 1944–1956
  - 1st Medium Bomber Group

Canada

- Royal Canadian Air Force (RCAF) 286 aircraft 1943–1957
  - Operational Squadrons of the Home War Establishment (HWE):
    - No. 8 Squadron RCAF
    - No. 113 Squadron RCAF
    - No. 115 Squadron RCAF
    - No. 145 Squadron RCAF
    - No. 149 Squadron RCAF
  - 1 Central Flying School, Trenton, Ontario
  - RCAF Station Pennfield Ridge, New Brunswick

France

- French Navy – Aeronavale 1944–1961
  - Flottille 6F (PV-1 only, from 1944 to 1947)
  - Escadrille 11S (PV-1 from 1947 to 1953 and six PV-2s from 1953 to 1960) for transport duty only.

Italy

- Italian Air Force operated 22 Lockheed PV-2 Harpoon from 1953 until 1959

Japan

- Japan Maritime Self-Defense Force 17 aircraft from 1955 to 1960
  - Kanoya Flying Training Wing

Netherlands

- Dutch Naval Aviation Service 18 aircraft from 1951 to 1955
  - No. 320 (Netherlands) Squadron RAF

New Zealand

- Royal New Zealand Air Force 143 aircraft from 1943 to 1948
  - No. 1 Squadron RNZAF
  - No. 2 Squadron RNZAF
  - No. 3 Squadron RNZAF
  - No. 4 Squadron RNZAF
  - No. 8 Squadron RNZAF
  - No. 9 Squadron RNZAF
  - No. 487 Squadron RNZAF
  - No. 1 (B) OTU
  - No. 14 Servicing Unit

Portugal

- Portuguese Air Force 42 aircraft from 1954 to 1975
  - Squadron 61, Montijo Air Base (1954–1960)
  - Squadron 62, Montijo Air Base (1954–1960)
  - Squadron 91, Luanda Air Base, Angola (1961–1971)
  - Squadron 103, Beira Air Base, Mozambique (1962)
  - Squadron 101, Beira Air Base, Mozambique (1962–1975)
  - Squadron 401, Henrique de Carvalho Air Base, Angola (1971–1975)

South Africa to 1960

- South African Air Force
  - 17 Squadron SAAF
  - 22 Squadron SAAF
  - 23 Squadron SAAF
  - 25 Squadron SAAF
  - 27 Squadron SAAF
  - 29 Squadron SAAF
  - 60 Squadron SAAF

United Kingdom

- Royal Air Force
  - No. 13 Squadron RAF (Coastal Command)
  - No. 21 Squadron RAF
  - No. 299 Squadron RAF
  - No. 500 Squadron RAF
  - No. 519 Squadron RAF (Coastal Command)
  - No. 521 Squadron RAF (Coastal Command)
  - No. 624 Squadron RAF
  - No. 34 OTU, RAF, operated from Pennfield Ridge, New Brunswick
  - Air Headquarters Iraq Communication Flight
- Royal Navy 1 aircraft for evaluation only

United States

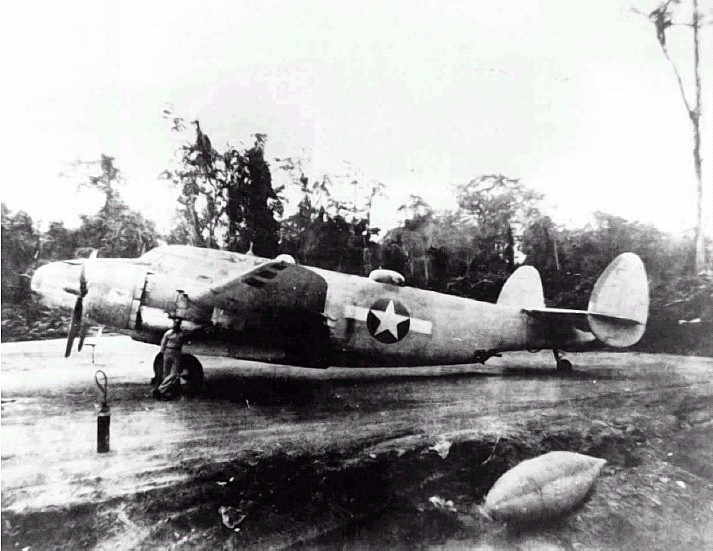
A USMC PV-1 night fighter from VMF(N)-531 in the Solomons, 1943.

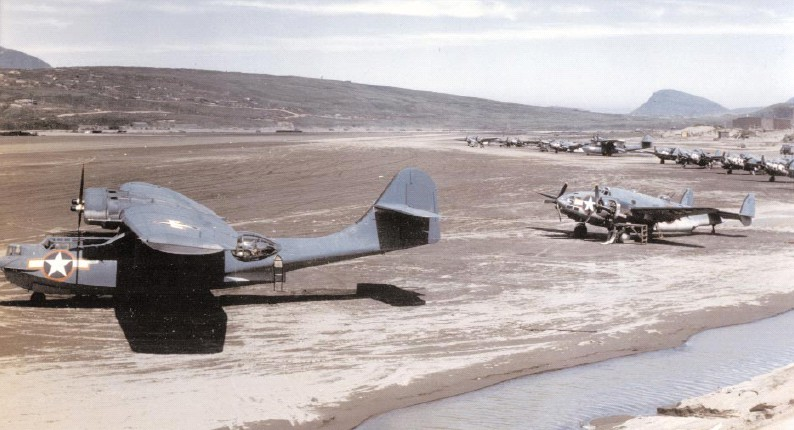
PBY-5As and PV-1s of VPB-135 on an Aleutian airfield in 1943, most likely Atka Island.

- United States Marine Corps
  - VMF(N)-531
- United States Navy
  - VB/VPB-125 — (PV-1) September 1942 – June 1945
  - VB/VPB-126 — (PV-1) March 1943 – June 1945
  - VB/VPB-127 — (PV-1) March 1943 – July 1945
  - VB/VPB-128, VP-ML-1 — (PV-1) February 1943 – November 1946, (PV-2) November 1946 – September 1947
  - VB/VPB-129 — (PV-1) April 1943 – June 1945
  - VB/VPB-130, VP-ML-2 — (PV-1) March 1943 – May 1945, (PV-2) August 1945 – March 1947
  - VB/VPB-131 — (PV-1) March 1943 – August 1945, (PV-2) September 1945 – April 1946.
  - VB/VPB-132 — (PV-1) March 1943 – May 1945
  - VB/VPB-133 — (PV-1) March 1943 – 1946, (PV-2) 1946
  - VPB-134VB/VPB-134 — (PV-1) April 1943 – April 1945
  - VB/VPB-135, VP-ML-5 — (PV-1) February 1943 – June 1945, (PV-2) June 1945 – June 1948
  - VB/VPB-136 — (PV-1) June 1943 – March 1945, (PV-2) May 1945 – 1946
  - VB/VPB-137 — (PV-1) March 1943 – July 1945
  - VB/VPB-138 — (PV-1) March 1943 – November 1944
  - VB/VPB-139 — (PV-1) May 1943 – June 1944, (PV-2) August 1944 – September 1945
  - VB/VPB-140 — (PV-1) April 1943 – May 1944
  - VB/VPB-141 — (PV-1) July 1943 – April 1945, (PV-2) April 1945 – June 1945
  - VB/VPB-142 — (PV-1) June 1943 – January 1945, (PV-2) January 1945 – May 1946
  - VB/VPB-143 — (PV-1) June 1943 – 1945
  - VB/VPB-144 — (PV-1) July 1943 – September 1944, (PV-2) November 1944 – May 1946
  - VB/VPB-145 — (PV-1) July 1943 – June 1945
  - VB/VPB/VP-146, VP-ML-6 — (PV-1) July 1943 – February 1945, (PV-2) April 1945 – February 1948
  - VB/VPB-147 — (PV-1) August 1943 –May 1945, (PV-2) April 1945 – July 1945
  - VB/VPB-148 — (PV-1) October 1943 – April 1945, (PV-2) June 1945 – June 1946
  - VB/VPB-149 — (PV-1) September 1943 – September 1945
  - VB/VPB-150 — (PV-1) November 1943 – March 1945, (PV-2) May 1945 – July 1945
  - VB/VPB-151 — (PV-1) January 1944 – June 1945
  - VB/VPB-152 — (PV-1) April 1944 – June 1946
  - VB/VPB-153 — (PV-1) April 1944 – October 1945, (PV-2) November 1945 – June 1946
  - VB/VPB-200
  - VD-2

== Surviving aircraft ==
=== Australia ===
Under restoration

- PV-1 ?? – former RAAF aircraft A59-73, owned by the East Arnhemland Historical Society and under restoration in Darwin for eventual display at Gove, Northern Territory.
- PV-1 49555 – under restoration by the Queensland Air Museum in Caloundra, Queensland, painted with its Royal Australian Air Force serial of A59-96.

Stored

- PV-1 33369 - stored by the Royal Australian Air Force Museum awaiting restoration to static display standard; previously operated by the RAAF Historic Flight, 1988–96, as VH-SFF (former N159U), painted as A59-67.

=== Brazil ===
On display

- PV-1 48654, c/n 237–58906, former N165H – Museu Aeroespacial in Rio de Janeiro.

=== Canada ===
Under restoration

- PV-1 33315 – under restoration by the Ventura Memorial Flight Association in Edmonton, Alberta.

=== Italy ===
On display

- PV-2 ‘MM80074’ – Museo Piana delle Orme - Latina - Italy

=== New Zealand ===
On display

- RB-34 41-38117 (NZ4600) – Museum of Transport and Technology in Auckland.

=== South Africa ===
On display

- PV-1 34759 – Dickie Fritz Shell Hole M.O.T.H. compound in Johannesburg.

=== United States ===
Airworthy

- PV-1 34670 – privately owned in Eagan, Minnesota.
- PV-2 37107 – privately owned in Orange, California.
- PV-2 37129 - Wingspan Air Heritage Foundation in Mesa, Arizona.
- PV-2 37211 – Palm Springs Air Museum in Palm Springs, California.
- PV-2 37270 – Wingspan Air Heritage Foundation in Mesa, Arizona.
- PV-2 37276 - privately owned in Eugene, Oregon.
- PV-2 37254 – privately owned in Fairacres, New Mexico.
- PV-2 37396 – American Military Heritage Foundation in Indianapolis, Indiana. Donated to Military Aviation Museum, Virginia Beach VA
- PV-2 37466 – privately owned in Orange, California.
- PV-2 37507 - privately owned in Mesa, Arizona.
- PV-2 37535 – Erickson Aircraft Collection in Madras, Oregon.
- PV-2 37633 – Wingspan Air Heritage Foundation in Mesa, Arizona.
- PV-2 84062 – Stockton Field Aviation Museum in Stockton, California.

On display

- B-34 41-38032 – Orlando Sanford International Airport (former Naval Air Station Sanford), Sanford, Florida. Aircraft is on loan from the National Museum of Naval Aviation. Restored by the Naval Air Station Sanford Memorial Committee.
- PV-2 37230 – National Museum of Naval Aviation at Naval Air Station Pensacola in Pensacola, Florida.
- PV-2 37257 – Pima Air & Space Museum, adjacent to Davis-Monthan Air Force Base in Tucson, Arizona.
- PV-2 37492 – painted (fully yellow, formerly marked "Air Tropic Island Charters") on display at Mayday Golf in North Myrtle Beach, South Carolina.

Under restoration or in storage

- PV-2 37202 – in storage at the Fantasy of Flight in Polk City, Florida.
- PV-2 84060 – in storage at the Cavanaugh Flight Museum in Addison, Texas. To be moved to North Texas Regional Airport in Denison, Texas.
- RB-34 AJ311 – in storage at the National Museum of the United States Air Force at Wright-Patterson Air Force Base in Dayton, Ohio.

known surviving wrecks

- A PV-2 lost in 1947 in Lake Washington during a takeoff accident from Naval Station Puget Sound lies in approximately 140' of water. the wreck is mostly intact nosed into the bottom but its empenage is broken off.

.

== Specifications (B-34 Lexington) ==
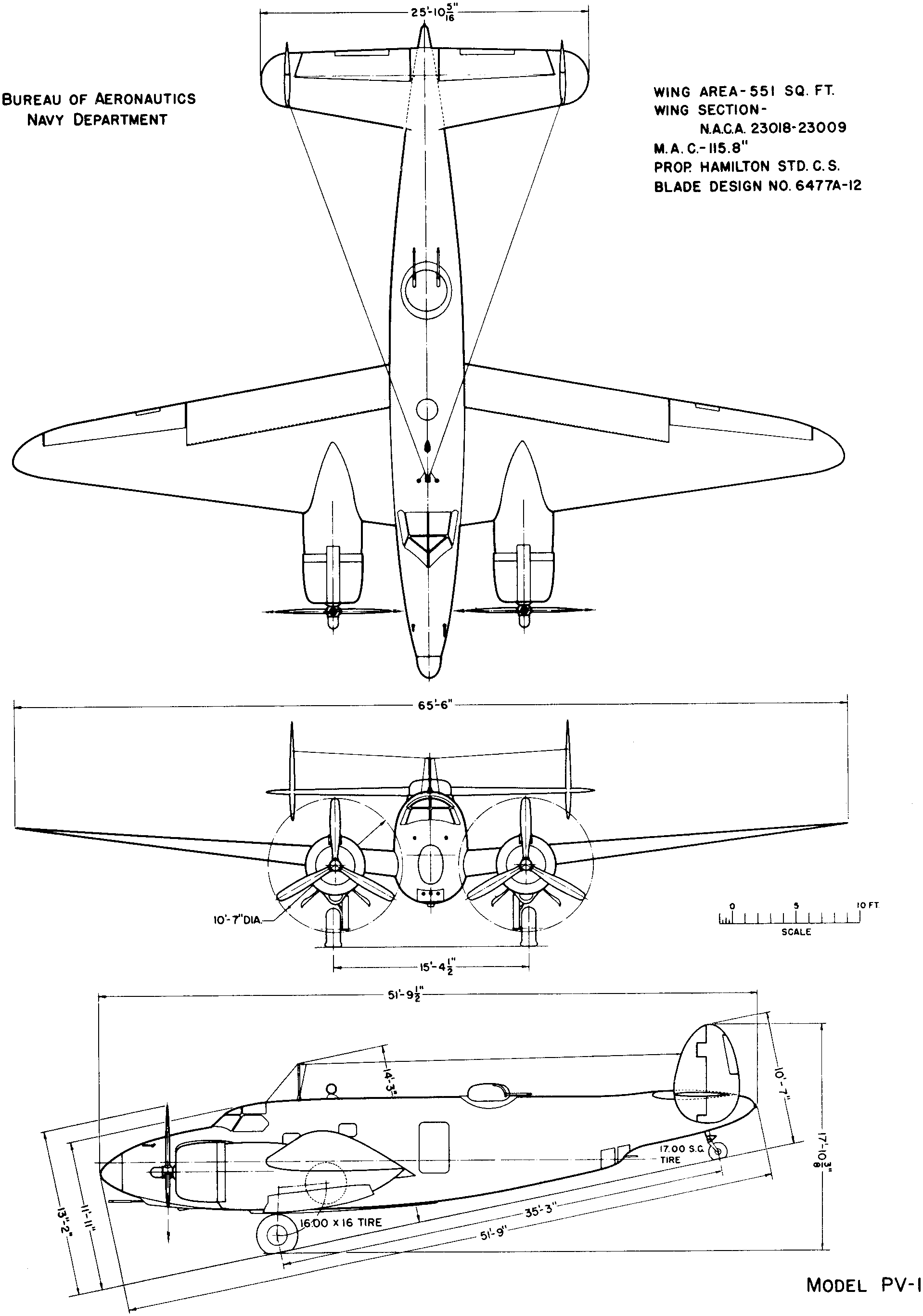
3-view line drawing of the Lockheed PV-1 Ventura

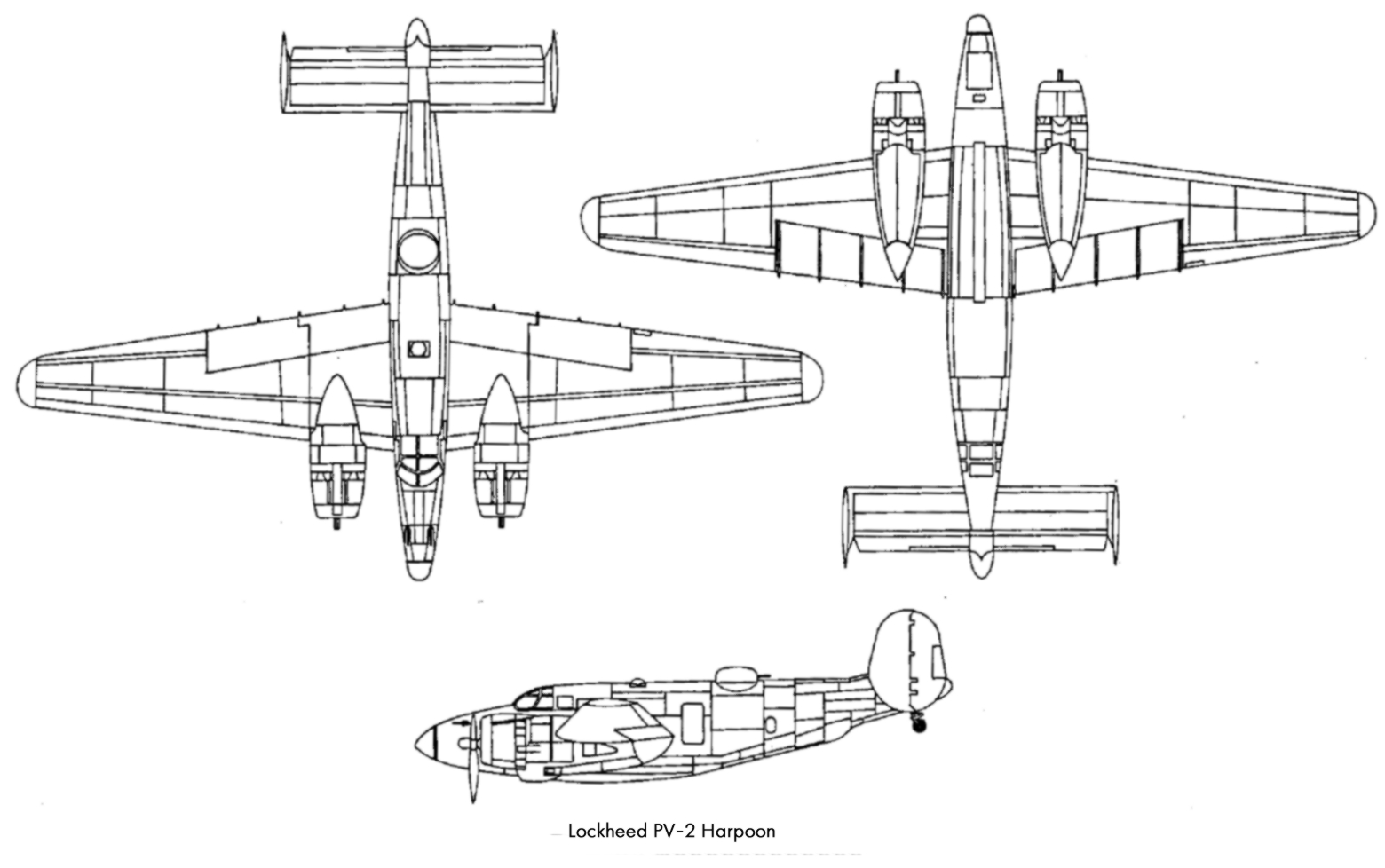
PV-2 Harpoon 3-side-drawing

Data from

General characteristics

- Crew: 6
- Length: 51 ft 5 in (15.7 m)
- Wingspan: 65 ft 6 in (20 m)
- Height: 11 ft 10 in (3.6 m)
- Wing area: 551 sq ft (51.2 m^{2})
- Empty weight: 20,197 lb (9,161 kg)
- Gross weight: 31,000 lb (14,061 kg)
- Max takeoff weight: 34,000 lb (15,422 kg)
- Powerplant: 2 × Pratt & Whitney R-2800 radial engines, 2,000 hp (1,500 kW) each

Performance

- Maximum speed: 322 mph (518 km/h, 280 kn)
- Cruise speed: 230 mph (370 km/h, 200 kn)
- Range: 1,660 mi (2,670 km, 1,440 nmi)
- Ferry range: 2,600 mi (4,200 km, 2,300 nmi)
- Service ceiling: 26,300 ft (8,020 m)
- Rate of climb: 2,035 ft/min (15.4 m/s)
- Wing loading: 56.4 lb/sq ft (275 kg/m^{2})
- Power/mass: 0.13 hp/lb (0.21 kW/kg)

Armament

- Guns:
  - 4 × .50 BMG (12.7 mm) Browning M2 machine guns
  - 2 × .30 cal. (7.62 mm) M1919 Browning machine guns
- Bombs:
  - 3,000 lb (1,400 kg) general ordnance or
  - 6 × 325 lb (147 kg) depth charges or
  - 1 × torpedo

== See also ==
- Lockheed PV-2 Harpoon No. 37396

Aircraft of comparable role, configuration, and era

- Junkers Ju 88
- Kyushu Q1W Tōkai

Related lists

- List of military aircraft of the United States
- List of United States Navy aircraft designations (pre-1962)
- List of bomber aircraft
- List of Lockheed aircraft
- List of aircraft of World War II
