= VPB-129 =

Patrol Bombing Squadron 129
- Active: 22 February 1943 – 4 June 1945
- Country: United States of America
- Branch: United States Navy
- Type: squadron
- Role: Maritime patrol
- Engagements: World War II

Aircraft flown
- Patrol: PV-1

VPB-129 was a Patrol Bombing Squadron of the U.S. Navy. The squadron was established as Bombing Squadron 129 (VB-129) on 22 February 1943, redesignated Patrol Bombing Squadron 129 (VPB-129) on 1 October 1944 and disestablished on 4 June 1945.

== Operational history ==
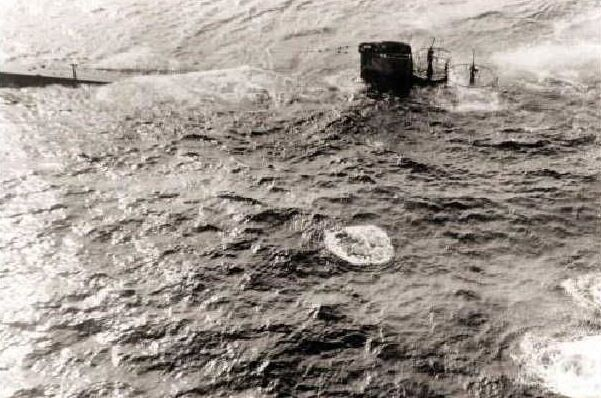
U-604 under attack by VB-129, 30 July 1943

- 22 February – May 1943: VB-129 was established at NAS DeLand, Florida, under the operational control of FAW-12, as a medium bombing squadron flying the PV-1 Ventura. After completing the customary ground school training, the flight crews were introduced to twin-engine operation in the SNB-1 Kansan, before getting orientation to the more powerful Ventura. The squadron was relocated on 10 May to NAAF Boca Chica, Florida, for shakedown and advanced flight training. Maintenance problems were gradually worked out after the newly established HEDRON system was in place and functional. Shakedown training was cut short by operational demands.
- 30 May 1943: VB-129 was transferred to NAF Natal, Brazil, under the operational control of FAW-16. The squadron hastily departed NAAF Boca Chica in elements of three aircraft, the last arriving at NAF Natal on 5 June. Conditions at NAF Natal were at that time very primitive. There was no Navy establishment and the small Army Post Exchange was the only place where basic amenities could be obtained. Anti-submarine warfare (ASW) patrols, convoy escort and barrier sweeps commenced upon arrival. The squadron’s first operational casualty occurred when one of its aircrews failed to return from a routine familiarization flight. Extensive searches of the sector gave no clue to the crew’s fate until a section of wingtip washed up on the beach days later.
- 15 June 1943: The squadron was relocated to NAF Recife, Brazil, to continue the ASW patrols, convoy escort and barrier sweeps as before. The base at Recife was still in the process of being set up. The HEDRON was not yet functional and had no shops or adequate berthing facilities. The nearby town of Pernambuco had more to offer on liberty than Natal, and a strong British presence made American visitors feel welcome.
- 24 July 1943: VB-129 was transferred to NAF Ipitanga, Bahia, Brazil. VB-129 was the first Navy squadron to use the facility, which had been previously shared by the Army and Pan American Airways. The squadron shared the field with a Brazilian Air Force squadron flying Hudsons (three crews and three aircraft). This squadron and VP-74, a PBM squadron located at NAF Aratu, near the town of Bahia, came under the command of VB-129’s skipper, who was the senior naval officer present. Sweeps were coordinated between the three squadrons. The field had only one airstrip bordered by high sand hills. The city of Bahia was located 30 miles (48 km) away, but did have a naval presence in the form of a Navy base. Buildings that existed at Ipitanga Field were quickly converted to barracks, mess hall and recreational facilities. R&R was spent by squadron personnel on five-day leave periods to Rio de Janeiro. It was on one of these trips that the squadron incurred its second major loss when the Naval Air Transport Service transport aircraft crashed, killing three squadron officers and three enlisted personnel. The squadron maintenance program at Ipitanga Field was hampered by the inadequacies of the understaffed and poorly equipped HEDRON. It was always necessary to lend HEDRON enlisted personnel to accomplish the maintenance required while at this field. During operations from Ipitanga the elimination of drop tanks and two Depth charges improved the safety record of the squadron and eased the load on the aircraft.
- 30 July 1943: Lieutenant Commander Thomas D. Davies and crew sighted a surfaced U-boat during a coastal barrier sweep northeast of Bahia. The U-boat crew attempted to fight it out with their 20-mm amti-aircraft guns, but the bow guns of the Ventura quickly cleared the decks of the submarine, allowing Davies to make a perfect drop with four Mark 47 depth charges on the still surfaced U-boat. The submarine U-604, submerged after the attack then surfaced again at a 60 degree angle with the screws out of the water and then submerged again. Later, German prisoners of war indicated that damage to the U-boat was so severe that it had to be scuttled on 11 August.
- 7 February 1944: VB-129 was relieved for return to NAS Quonset Point, Rhode Island, under the operational control of FAW-9. All hands were given 15 days home leave with orders to return on 24 February for AsDevLant school for HVAR rocket projectile training. Each student was required to fire at least 56 rockets before being qualified. During this interval, eight of the squadron aircraft were refitted with rocket rails.
- 27 March 1944: VB-129 was put back on operational patrols from NAS Quonset Point, under the operational control of FAW-9 and the Eastern Sea Frontier. Missions consisted of ASW sweeps, convoy coverage and sweeps of convoy tracks.
- 4 May 1944: The squadron was transferred to NAS Elizabeth City, North Carolina, with the same mission assignment as at Quonset Point.
- 4–11 November 1944: VPB-129 was temporarily detached for a week to conduct ASW sweeps and convoy patrols from NAS New York.
- 3 December 1944 – March 1945: A three-aircraft detachment was sent to NAS Brunswick, Maine for ASW duty. The detachment was rotated among all the squadron aircrews through 13 March 1945 when the detachment rejoined the squadron at NAS Elizabeth City.
- 21 May 1945: Orders were received for disestablishment of the squadron. Aircraft were ferried to NAS Clinton, Oklahoma, and personnel were given their orders for demobilization or extension of duty.
- 4 June 1945: VPB-129 was formally disestablished at NAS Quonset Point.

== Aircraft assignments ==
The squadron was assigned the following aircraft, effective on the dates shown:

- PV-1 - April 1943

== Home port assignments ==
The squadron was assigned to these home ports, effective on the dates shown:

- NAS DeLand, Florida - 22 February 1943
- NAAF Boca Chica, Florida - 10 May 1943
- NAF Natal, Brazil - 30 May 1943
- NAF Recife, Brazil - 15 June 1943
- NAF Ipitanga, Brazil - 24 July 1943
- NAS Quonset Point, Rhode Island - 7 February 1944
- NAS Elizabeth City, North Carolina - 4 May 1944
- NAS Quonset Point - May 1945

== See also ==
- Maritime patrol aircraft
- List of inactive United States Navy aircraft squadrons
- List of United States Navy aircraft squadrons
- List of squadrons in the Dictionary of American Naval Aviation Squadrons
- History of the United States Navy
