= VPB-137 =

Patrol Bombing Squadron 137
- Active: 17 February 1943 – 20 July 1945
- Country: United States of America
- Branch: United States Navy
- Type: squadron
- Role: Maritime patrol
- Engagements: World War II

Aircraft flown
- Patrol: PV-1

VPB-137 was a Patrol Bombing Squadron of the U.S. Navy. The squadron was established as Bombing Squadron 137 (VB-137) on 17 February 1943, redesignated Patrol Bombing Squadron 137 (VPB-137) on 1 October 1944 and disestablished on 20 July 1945.

== Operational history ==
- 17 February 1943: VB-137 was established at NAS Alameda, California, under the operational control of FAW8, as a medium bombing squadron flying the PV-1 Ventura. Squadron personnel underwent intensive ground and flight training through early May when orders were received for the trans-Pacific to Hawaii.
- 9 May – 30 June 1943: The squadron aircraft and personnel were loaded aboard ship for transport to NAS Kaneohe Bay, Hawaii, arriving on 16 May 1943. Upon arrival, the squadron came under the operational control of FAW-2. On 18 May a detachment of six-aircraft was sent to Midway Island for operational patrols and advanced training. A second detachment of three-aircraft was sent to NAAF Funafuti, in the Ellice Island group, on 30 June, making VPB-137 the first Ventura-equipped squadron to operate in the South Pacific.
- 2 July – November 1943: VB-137 was transferred to Wallis Island, joining the detachment already there. Through the middle of November, the squadron patrolled the areas around Wallis and Funafuti Islands. During the Gilbert and Marshall Islands campaign, the squadron provided low-altitude reconnaissance for the task force commanders. In mid-November the squadron was flown to a back area in Western Samoa for two weeks of overhaul and change of aircraft engines.
- December 1943: VB-137 was relocated to Betio, 700 miles (1,100 km) from Funafuti, only a week after the end of the Battle of Tarawa. Living conditions were very primitive, with the crews sleeping on the ground the first three nights until tents could be erected. Sniper activity continued for weeks after the squadron arrived.
- 15 January 1944: VB-137 was relieved for return to NAS Kaneohe Bay, and then on to the U.S. for home leave and reforming. During combat operations from 18 May 1943 to 13 January 1944, the squadron lost eight aircraft and three crews in combat and two others in accidents.
- 2 March 1944: VB-137 reformed at NAS Alameda, under the operational control of FAW-8. On 24 March, the squadron was moved to NAAS Crows Landing, California, for advanced flight training, returning to NAS Alameda on 1 August 1944.
- 9 August 1944: VB-137 aircraft, equipment and personnel were loaded aboard USS Nassau for transportation to Hawaii, arriving at Ford Island on 15 August. After unloading, all personnel, aircraft and equipment was delivered to NAS Kaneohe Bay under the operational control of FAW-2.
- 22 August 1944: A six-aircraft detachment was sent to Midway Island to conduct daily patrols. Three more aircraft augmented this detachment three days later. All nine aircraft returned to NAS Kaneohe Bay on 4 September.
- 3 September 1944: A three-aircraft/four-crew detachment was sent to Johnston Atoll to conduct daily patrols. A second detachment of three-aircraft replaced the first detachment on 19 September.
- 15 October 1944: VPB-137 deployed south to Mokerang Airfield, Los Negros Island, Admiralty Island, under the operational control of FAW-17. The squadron arrived on 26 October and became operational on the 31st.
- 29 November 1944: VPB-137 moved by sections to Morotai, coming under the operational control of FAW-10. The squadron conducted daily patrols with occasional strikes on Japanese installations on Tobi Island.
- 1 January 1945: VPB-137 moved to Tacloban Field, Leyte, Philippines. On 3 January, a surprise air raid destroyed nine squadron aircraft and damaged two. Missions during this period included daily searches, with occasional taxi hops to Samar, Mindoro, Lingayen, Clark Field, Morotai and Owi.
- 17 February 1945: The squadron mounted a four-aircraft strike on Surigao Town, Luzon, Philippines.
- 11 March – May 1945: A detachment of six-airplanes was sent to Clark Field, Luzon, with another detachment of eight aircraft remaining at Tacloban. On 15 April, the Tacloban detachment relocated to Samar. On 27 May the Clark Field detachment joined the Samar detachment.
- 10–31 May 1945: VPB-137 aircraft attacked the butanol refineries at Mato and Shōka, Formosa; Japanese infantry units in upper Cagayan Valley, Luzon; and railroad facilities at Shōka, Shinei, Taitō and other locations on Formosa.
- 8 June 1945: VPB-137 was relieved for return to the U.S., arriving at NAS Kaneohe Bay, on 9 June. The squadron remained at NAS Kaneohe Bayuntil arrangements could be made to transport them back to the States. On 2 July the squadron boarded a ship bound for San Diego. Upon arrival on 9 July, all hands were given leave.
- 20 Jul 1945: VPB-137 was disestablished at NAS San Diego.

== Aircraft assignments ==
The squadron was assigned the following aircraft, effective on the dates shown:

- PV-1 - March 1943

== Home port assignments ==
The squadron was assigned to these home ports, effective on the dates shown:

- NAS Alameda, California - 17 February 1943
- NAS Kaneohe Bay, Hawaii - 16 May 1943
- NAS Alameda - January 1944
- NAAS Crows Landing, California - 24 March 1944
- NAS Alameda - 1 August 1944
- NAS Kaneohe Bay - 15 August 1944
- NAS San Diego, California - 9 July 1945

== See also ==
- Maritime patrol aircraft
- List of inactive United States Navy aircraft squadrons
- List of United States Navy aircraft squadrons
- List of squadrons in the Dictionary of American Naval Aviation Squadrons
- History of the United States Navy
