= VP-142 =

Patrol Squadron 142
- Active: 1 June 1943 – 14 June 1946
- Country: United States of America
- Branch: United States Navy
- Type: squadron
- Role: Maritime patrol
- Engagements: World War II

Aircraft flown
- Patrol: PV-1; PV-2

VP-142 was a Patrol Squadron of the U.S. Navy. The squadron was established as Bombing Squadron 142 (VB-142) on 1 June 1943, redesignated Patrol Bombing Squadron 142 (VPB-142) on 1 October 1944, redesignated Patrol Squadron 142 (VP-142) on 15 May 1946 and disestablished on 14 June 1946.

== Operational history ==
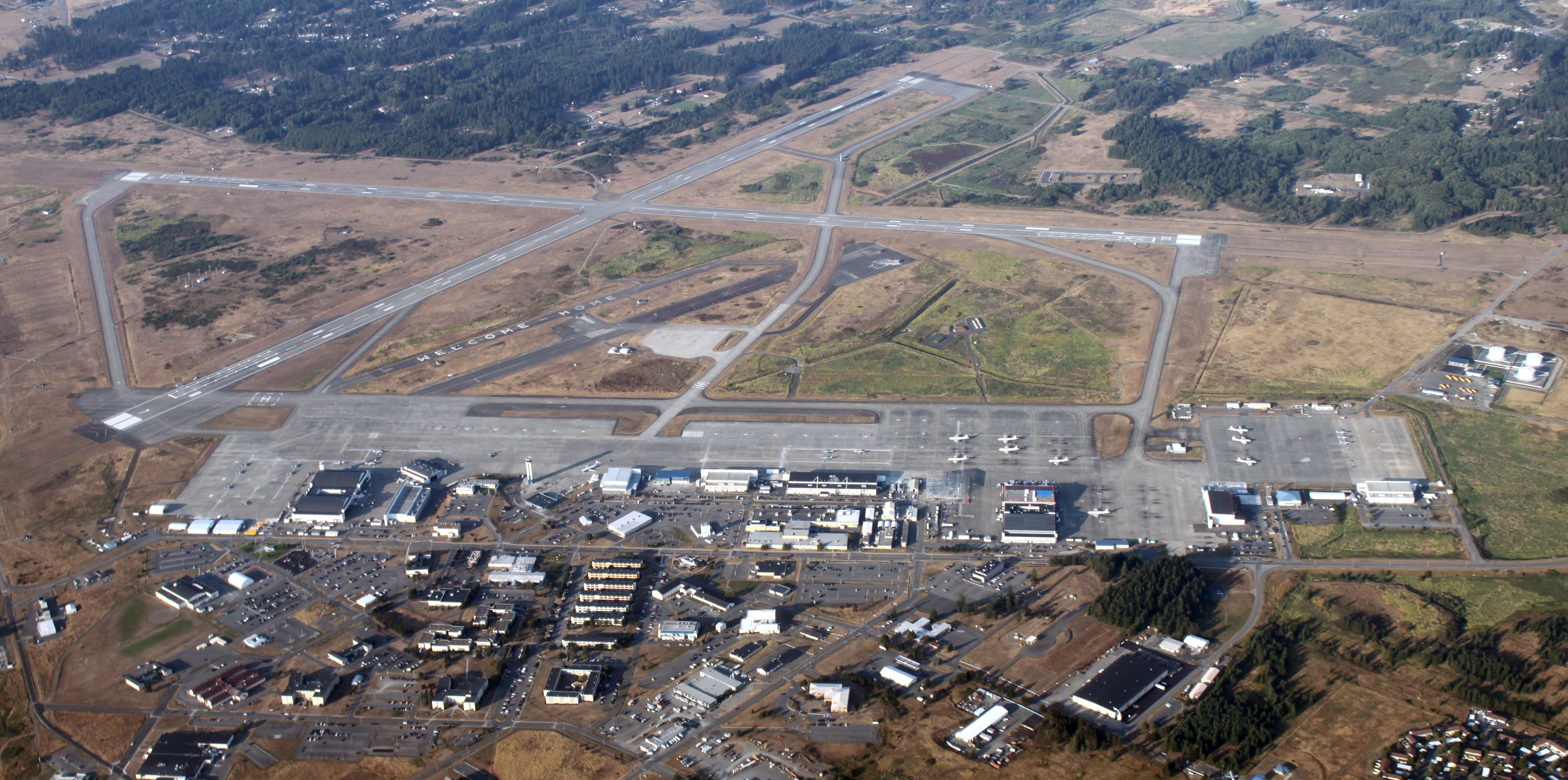
NAS Whidbey Island

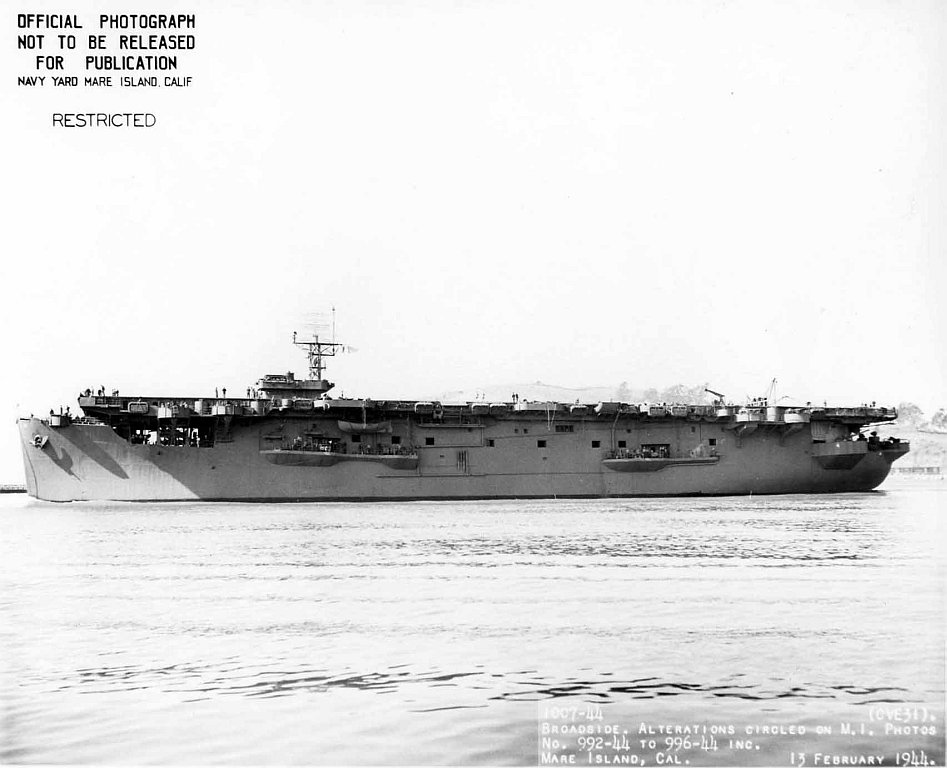
USS Prince William

- 1 June 1943: VB-142 was established at NAS Whidbey Island, Washington, as a medium bomber squadron flying the PV-1 Ventura. During the training period the squadron came under the operational control of FAW-6.
- 7–19 August 1943: VB-142 departed NAS Whidbey Island for NAS Alameda, California, where the squadron prepared its aircraft and equipment for shipment to NAS Kaneohe Bay, Hawaii. On 10 August, the squadron loaded its equipment, aircraft and personnel aboard USS Prince William. The squadron arrived at Naval Base Pearl Harbor on the 16th and proceeded to unload and assemble the aircraft for the short hop to NAS Kaneohe Bay, arriving there on 18 and 19 August 1943.
- 28 August – 11 December 1943: After a brief period of combat oriented training at NAS Kaneohe Bay, the squadron sent a detachment of six aircraft to Midway Island for experience in combat patrols and searches 500 miles (800 km) to the west and southwest in the direction of enemy-held Wake Island. A second detachment of four aircraft and six crews was sent to Johnston Atoll to maintain patrols. Upon return of the detachments to NAS Kaneohe Bay on 11 November, the squadron readied its aircraft for its deployment to the combat zone further south. On 11 December, shortly before departure to the South Pacific, the squadron suffered its first casualty during a training mission, when one of the planes crashed during a practice strafing run, killing all hands on board.

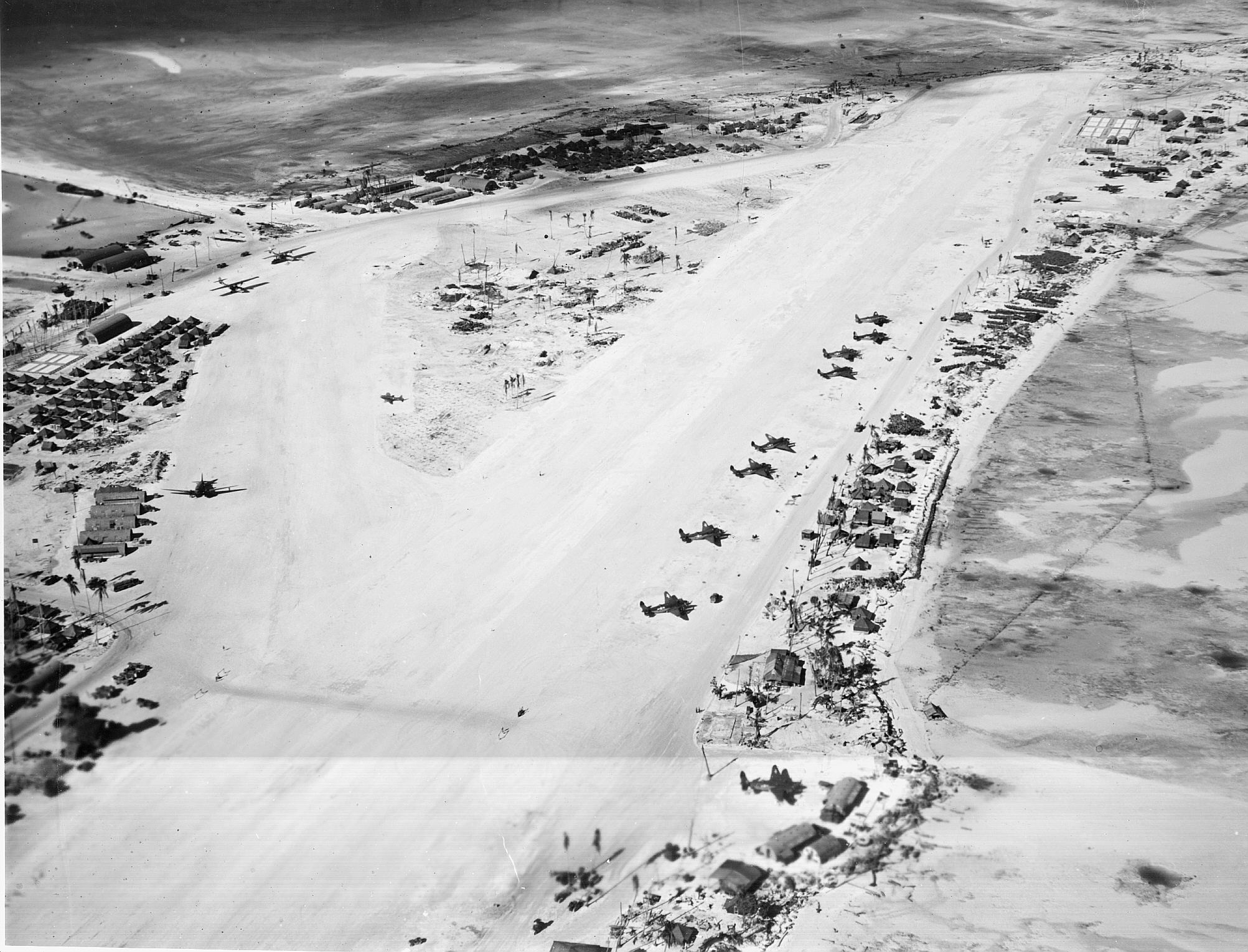
Hawkins Field in March 1944

- 19 December 1943 – March 1944: VB-142 departed NAS Kaneohe Bay for Hawkins Field, Tarawa (designated NAB/MCAS Betio on 1 April 1944). The atoll itself had only been wrested from the Japanese one month before and the Seabees had not had time to do more than improve the existing runway. Ten tents were the only shelters available. Japanese bombers from the Marshall Islands carried out nightly nuisance air raids. The squadron began combat operations on 20 January, conducting strikes against Emidj Island, Jaluit Atoll, Marshall Islands. By the 31st, the squadron was attacking enemy positions throughout the Marshalls in support of the occupation of Majuro and Eniwetok atolls. Bombing and night missions against the runways and installations on Wotje Atoll continued through the end of March 1944. Hunting during this period was particularly good, since the Japanese high command was still using scarce cargo vessels to reinforce their beleaguered garrisons before the threatened invasions began. Squadron aircraft attacked eleven enemy vessels, sending five to the bottom and crippling several others. In over 300 bombing missions there was only one casualty. On 20 January, Lieutenant (jg) Milton C. Villa and his crew were shot down during a bombing attack on the Japanese seaplane base at Jaluit.
- 1 April 1944: A detachment was sent to the recently captured Majuro island. Night attacks against Taroa Airfield were conducted from this base for a period of two weeks.
- 3 May 1944: Word was received that the enemy was planning a series of attacks from airfields located on Nauru Island. All 15 of the squadron's aircraft were utilized in a predawn strike against the island from the Tarawa home base. The airfield and other installations were heavily damaged and all squadron aircraft returned safely.
- 1–15 June 1944: The squadron flew nonstop missions in support of the early phases of the Marianas operations.
- 14–15 July 1944: The squadron conducted raids from Tarawa on enemy bases in the Marshalls group and on Nauru Island. During these raids the squadron encountered for the first time searchlights coupled with enemy anti-aircraft (AA) defenses. Despite this new turn of events, no squadron aircraft were lost during any of the raids. On the 15th, the squadron was relieved by VB-150.
- 25–31 July 1944: VB-142 departed aboard USS Windham Bay for its return to San Diego, arriving on 31 July. Upon arrival all hands were given rehabilitation leave and orders for reassignments to other squadrons.
- 5 September 1944 – January 1945: VB-142 was reformed at NAS Moffett Field, California., coming under the operational control of FAW-8. Most of the ground crew and flight crew personnel were assigned to NAS Alameda, to facilitate training. The squadron was assigned the upgraded version of the Ventura, the PV-2 Harpoon, but none were on hand for training. On 23 October, the squadron personnel relocated to NAS Moffett Field to continue flight training on PV-1 Venturas. The first PV-2 Harpoons began arriving in mid-January 1945.
- 18 February – 1 March 1945: VPB-142 boarded USS Intrepid for transportation to Pearl Harbor, arriving on 24 February. The squadron became operational at NAS Kaneohe Bay on 1 March, and commenced combat training and operational patrols in Hawaiian waters. Retrofits on the landing gear and gas tanks of the Harpoons delayed training somewhat. The new APA-16 radar bombsight was also installed on squadron aircraft during this period, greatly improving the Harpoon's hitting ability in both day and night attacks.
- 27 March – 20 April 1945: Six of the squadron aircraft were flown to Midway Island for experience in operational combat patrols. On 2 April, the squadron had its first casualty of this combat tour when Lieutenant (jg) Allen W. Keagle struck the cable of a towed target sleeve, causing the aircraft to spin into the ocean. The entire crew was lost in the crash.
- 28 May – June 1945: Combat and operational training continued at NAS Kaneohe Bay until orders were received on the 28th for deployment to the combat zone. The squadron began its movement south on the 31st in three-aircraft elements to NAB Tinian, becoming operational in early June. VPB-142 came under the operational control of FAW-18 at this time. The squadron was restricted to patrolling and short-range reconnaissance flights during this period due to reports of faulty wing structures in the Harpoons. Facilities at Tinian were a considerable improvement over Tarawa, but the boredom of routine and uninteresting terrain soon affected all hands.

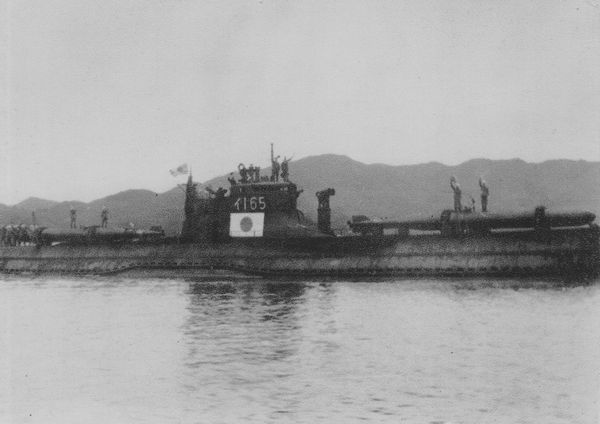
Japanese submarine I-165 with Kaitens just prior to sinking

- 27 June 1945: Lieutenant (jg) R. C. Janes and crew made an attack on a surfaced submarine that appeared to be carrying Kaiten mini-submarines on its deck. The submarine was straddled by the Depth charges and following the attack the crew observed two Kaitens, oil and other debris on the surface. Post war examination of Japanese records indicate that the submarine was I-165, which had departed the Inland Sea of Japan for a Kaiten attack on U.S. warships east of the Marianas. I-165 was sunk 480 miles (770 km) east of Saipan.
- 15–26 August 1945: The last combat patrol was flown over Truk. After landing, the crews learned that the Japanese had accepted the surrender terms. Armed patrols continued until 26 August. On that date, leaflets were dropped on Truk requesting that the commander of the Japanese garrison indicate his willingness to surrender. The approved signal was spotted on the runway at Truk the next day in the center of South Maen airstrip.
- 21 September 1945: VPB-142 was relieved for return to the U.S. via Eniwetok, Majuro, Johnston Atoll and NAS Kaneohe Bay. The squadron embarked on USS Petrof Bay on 5 October 1945 arriving at San Francisco on 10 October. Squadron personnel were given discharges or changes of duty upon arrival.
- January – June 1946: The squadron was transferred to the East Coast and reformed at NAS Edenton, North Carolina. Due to demobilization the squadron never reached full operational status and was officially disestablished at NAS Atlantic City, New Jersey, on 14 June 1946.

== Aircraft assignments ==
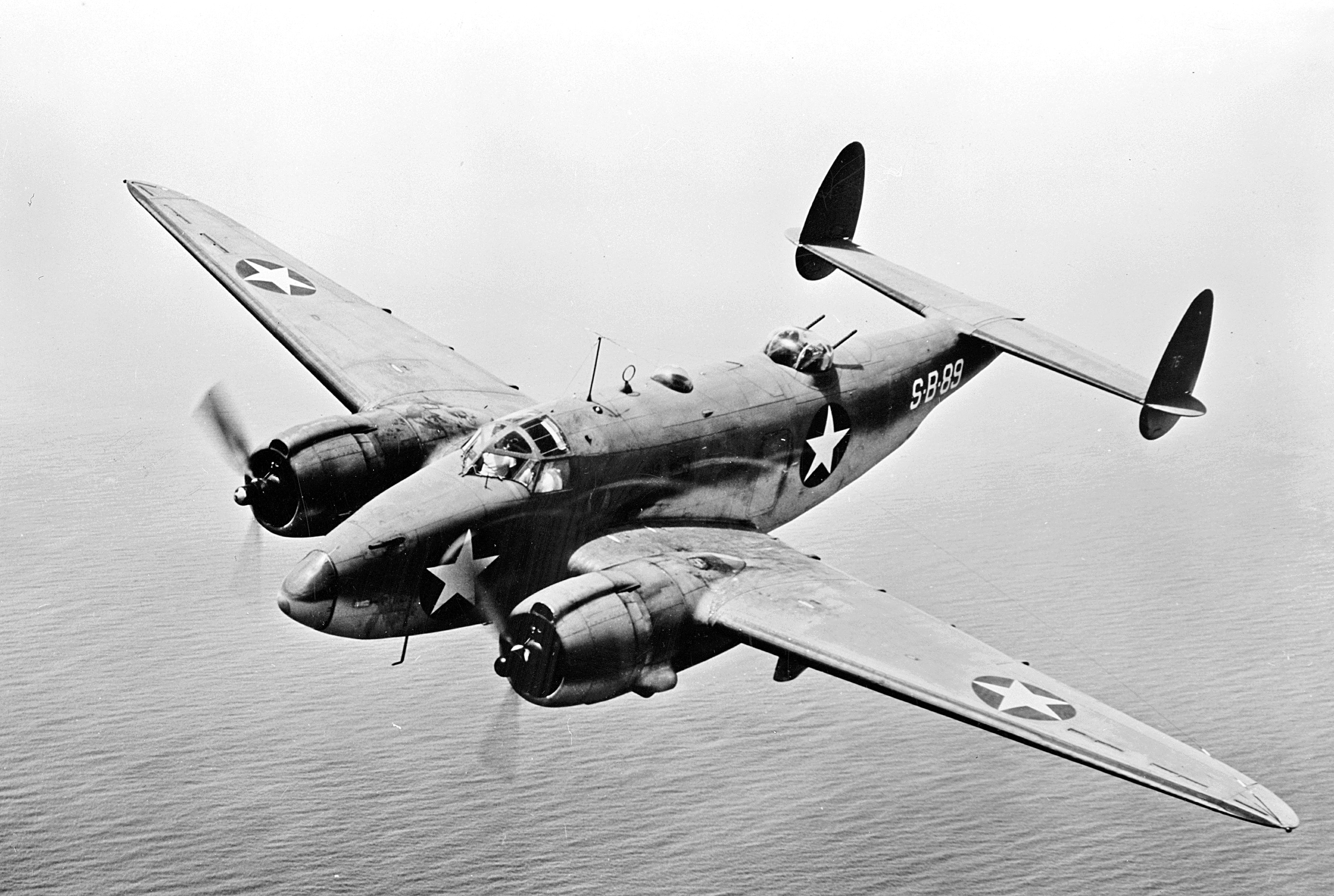
Lockheed Ventura PV-1

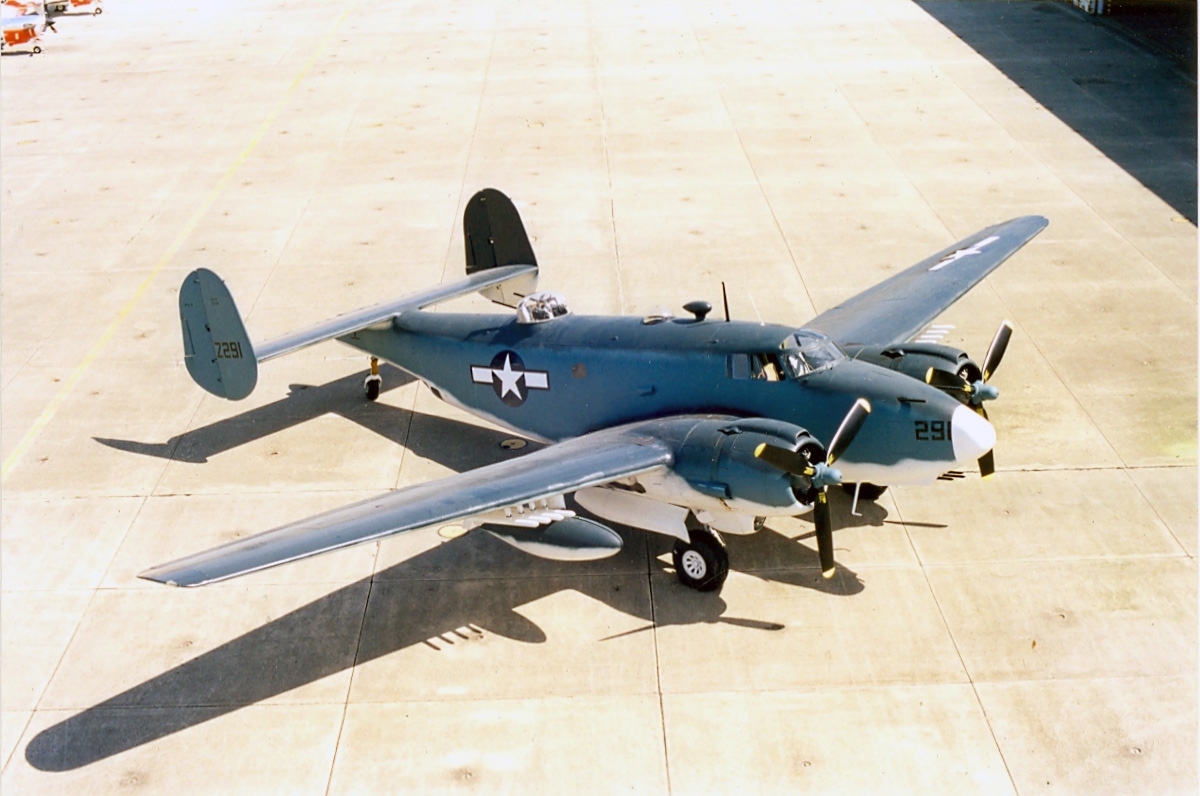
Lockheed Ventura PV-2 Harpoon

The squadron was assigned the following aircraft, effective on the dates shown:

- PV-1 - June 1943
- PV-2 - January 1945

== Commanding Officers during World War 2 ==
- Lt Commander Clayton L. Miller - 1 Jun 1943
- Lt Commander John H. Guthrie - 5 Sep 1944

== Home port assignments ==
The squadron was assigned to these home ports, effective on the dates shown:

- NAS Whidbey Island, Washington - 1 June 1943
- NAS Kaneohe Bay, Hawaii - 18 August 1943
- NAS San Diego, California - 31 July 1944
- NAS Moffett Field, California - 5 September 1944
- NAS Kaneohe Bay - 1 Mar 1945
- NAS Alameda, California - 10 October 1945
- NAS Edenton, North Carolina - 2 January 1946
- NAS Atlantic City, New Jersey - 24 May 1946

== See also ==
- Maritime patrol aircraft
- List of inactive United States Navy aircraft squadrons
- List of United States Navy aircraft squadrons
- List of squadrons in the Dictionary of American Naval Aviation Squadrons
- History of the United States Navy
