= VP-153 =

Patrol Squadron 153
- Active: 15 April 1944 – 14 June 1946
- Country: United States of America
- Branch: United States Navy
- Type: squadron
- Role: Maritime patrol
- Engagements: World War II

Aircraft flown
- Patrol: PV-1; PV-2

VP-153 was a Patrol Squadron of the U.S. Navy. The squadron was established as Bombing Squadron 153 (VB-153) on 15 April 1944, redesignated Patrol Bombing Squadron 153 (VPB-153) on 1 October 1944, redesignated Patrol Squadron 153 (VP-153) on 15 May 1946 and disestablished on 14 June 1946.

== Operational history ==
- 15 April 1944: VB-153 was established at NAS Clinton, Oklahoma, as a medium bombing squadron flying the PV-1 Ventura. Unlike other PV-1 squadrons, VB-153 was organized as a special squadron under the operational control of Training Task Force to carry a target seeking glider bomb known as Pelican. The device was equipped with beam-rider radar homing equipment developed by the Bureau of Ordnance Special Design Section in April 1942. Production of the missile was begun at Charleston, South Carolina., in September 1943. The missile was initially developed to be used against submarines and was designed around the casing of the standard 525-pound Depth charge. The disadvantage of the missile was that it could not be used against defended targets because the signal was lost beyond 800-foot (240 m). In order for the missile to locate its target the mother ship had to continue on a straight course while painting the target with its radar beams.
- 22 September 1944: After a number of unsuccessful test drops, the Pelican program was put on hold and VB-153 reverted to the normal PV-1 training syllabus. It had been determined that the PV-1 lacked sufficient range for carrying the device and associated gear.
- 4 November 1944 – March 1945: VPB-153 was transferred to its new home port at NAS Moffett Field, California, under the operational control of FAW-8. The squadron's specially modified PV-1s were left behind with the HEDRON, since the modifications for the Pelican had reduced the range significantly from the standard PV-1. The squadron continued its operational training in preparation for its upcoming transfer overseas. Rocket training was undertaken at NAAS Arcata, California and NAF Fallon, Nevada. On 28 February 1945, the squadron transitioned to the new PV-2 Harpoon. Shakedown was completed by the end of March.
- 24 March – April 1945: VPB-153 was transported by ship to Naval Base Pearl Harbor, Hawaii, and NAS Kaneohe Bay, under the operational control of FAW-2. Advanced op erational training was begun in early April for all hands. On 20 April, a detachment of six aircraft and eight crews was sent to Midway Island to fly routine search sectors.
- 6 May 1945: The squadron grounded all its aircraft due to a report that certain problems with wing spars in the PV-2 had caused crashes. The squadron and HEDRON maintenance personnel carefully checked out all of the aircraft before flights continued.
- 6 June – 12 July 1945: VPB-153 received orders to proceed for duty at NAS Agana, Guam, coming under the operational control of FAW-18. The squadron became operational at that site on 15 June and commenced flying routine patrols on the 20th. Each five-sector patrol was flown daily over a distance of 500 miles (800 km). Searches at this stage of the war were largely negative. On 12 July, the squadron flew air cover for the crippled SS Boudinot.
- October 1945: VPB-153 was relieved for return to the West Coast.
- 20 November 1945: VPB-153 was reformed at NAS Edenton, North Carolina, with nine PV-2 Harpoon aircraft under the operational control of FAW-5.
- 6 February – 20 March 1946: The home port for VPB-153 was officially changed from NAS Moffet Field to NAS Edenton. On 20 March 1946, word was received that the squadron was to be disestablished. The nine aircraft complement was transferred to the HEDRON, with two aircraft transferred in from the Headquarters Detachment of FAW-5 until the disestablishment of the squadron.
- 14 June 1946: VPB-153 was disestablished at NAS Edenton, N.C.

== Aircraft assignments ==
The squadron was assigned the following aircraft, effective on the dates shown:

- PV-1 – April 1944
- PV-2 – February 1945

== Home port assignments ==
The squadron was assigned to these home ports, effective on the dates shown:

- NAS Clinton, Oklahoma – 15 April 1944
- NAS Moffett Field, California – 4 November 1944
- NAS Kaneohe Bay, Hawaii – 24 March 1945
- NAS Moffett Field – October 1945
- NAS Edenton, North Carolina – 6 February 1946

== See also ==
- Maritime patrol aircraft
- List of inactive United States Navy aircraft squadrons
- List of United States Navy aircraft squadrons
- List of squadrons in the Dictionary of American Naval Aviation Squadrons
- History of the United States Navy
