= VPB-150 =

Patrol Bombing Squadron 150
- Active: 15 September 1943 – 20 July 1945
- Country: United States of America
- Branch: United States Navy
- Type: squadron
- Role: Maritime patrol
- Nickname(s): Devilfish P-Viators
- Engagements: World War II

Aircraft flown
- Patrol: PV-1; PV-2

VPB-150 was a Patrol Bombing Squadron of the U.S. Navy. The squadron was established as Bombing Squadron 150 (VB-150) on 15 September 1943, redesignated Patrol Bombing Squadron 150 (VPB-150) on 1 October 1944 and disestablished on 20 July 1945.

== Operational history ==
- 15 September 1943 – March 1944: VB-150 was established at NAS Alameda, California, under the operational control of FAW-8, as a medium bombing squadron flying the PV-1 Ventura. On 1 December 1943, the squadron was relocated to NAAS Vernalis, California, where further training was conducted through 6 March 1944. On that date, the squadron was transferred back to NAS Alameda to prepare for transport to Naval Base Pearl Harbor, Hawaii.
- 18 March 1944: Squadron personnel, equipment, supplies and aircraft were loaded aboard USS Nehenta Bay for transport to Hawaii. After arrival at NAS Ford Island, Pearl Harbor, on 23 March the squadron came under the operational control of FAW2. By the 25th, the squadron and all of its assets had been relocated to NAS Kaneohe Bay and combat training commenced. During this period squadron aircraft were fitted with HVAR rocket-launching rails and chin packs containing 50-caliber machine guns.
- 10 July – August 1944: VB-150 was transferred to NAB Betio, Tarawa Atoll, under the operational control of FAW-1. On the 25th the squadron made its first operational attacks on Japanese radar and anti-aircraft (AA) installations on the island of Nauru. Further strikes were made on Jaluit and Mille atolls through the end of August, with only one aircrew casualty and no aircraft losses.
- 28 August – November 1944: VB-150 was relocated to NAS North Field, Tinian. Operations continued from this site until 18 November when the squadron was moved to nearby West Field, Tinian, to make room for the growing numbers of Army B-29 Superfortresses engaged in the bombing campaign against the Japanese home islands. Duties at Tinian consisted primarily of reconnaissance flights to Woleai Island, Anti-submarine warfare (ASW) patrols and radar survey flights. On occasion, one aircraft would be detached for duty under Commander Air Defense Command at Kagman Field, Saipan. Attacks were frequently made on enemy bases on Pagan Island to prevent enemy attacks on the B-29 bases on Saipan and Tinian.
- 26 December 1944: A solitary Japanese bomber dropped bombs at night on the CASU maintenance area on Tinian. The resulting explosions and fires destroyed a PB4Y-1 of another squadron, one of squadron's Venturas and damaged two other aircraft. This was the first operational loss experienced by the squadron.
- 5 March 1945: VPB-150 was detached for return to NAS Kaneohe Bay, and the continental U.S. The squadron flew to NAS Kaneohe Bay, arriving on 10 March, and turned over its aircraft to the HEDRON. On the 16th squadron personnel boarded USS Nassau for departure to San Francisco, California.
- 5 May 1945: The squadron began reforming at NAS Moffett Field, California, under the operational control of FAW-8, and familiarization training on the new PV-2 Harpoon was begun. Although 12 Harpoons had been assigned, maintenance problems resulted in no more than two aircraft available for training.
- 19-20 July 1945: Orders were received for a standdown and disestablishment. The squadron was formally disestablished at NAS Moffett Field on 20 July 1945.

== Aircraft assignments ==
The squadron was assigned the following aircraft, effective on the dates shown:

- PV-1 - November 1943
- PV-2 - July 1945

== Home port assignments ==
The squadron was assigned to these home ports, effective on the dates shown:

- NAS Alameda, California - 15 September 1943
- NAAS Vernalis, California - 1 December 1943
- NAS Alameda - 6 March 1944
- NAS Kaneohe Bay, Hawaii - 25 March 1944
- NAS Moffett Field, California - 5 May 1945

== See also ==
- Maritime patrol aircraft
- List of inactive United States Navy aircraft squadrons
- List of United States Navy aircraft squadrons
- List of squadrons in the Dictionary of American Naval Aviation Squadrons
- History of the United States Navy
