= List of Douglas A-4 Skyhawk operators =

The List of Douglas A-4 Skyhawk operators lists the countries and their military units that operate or have operated the Skyhawk.

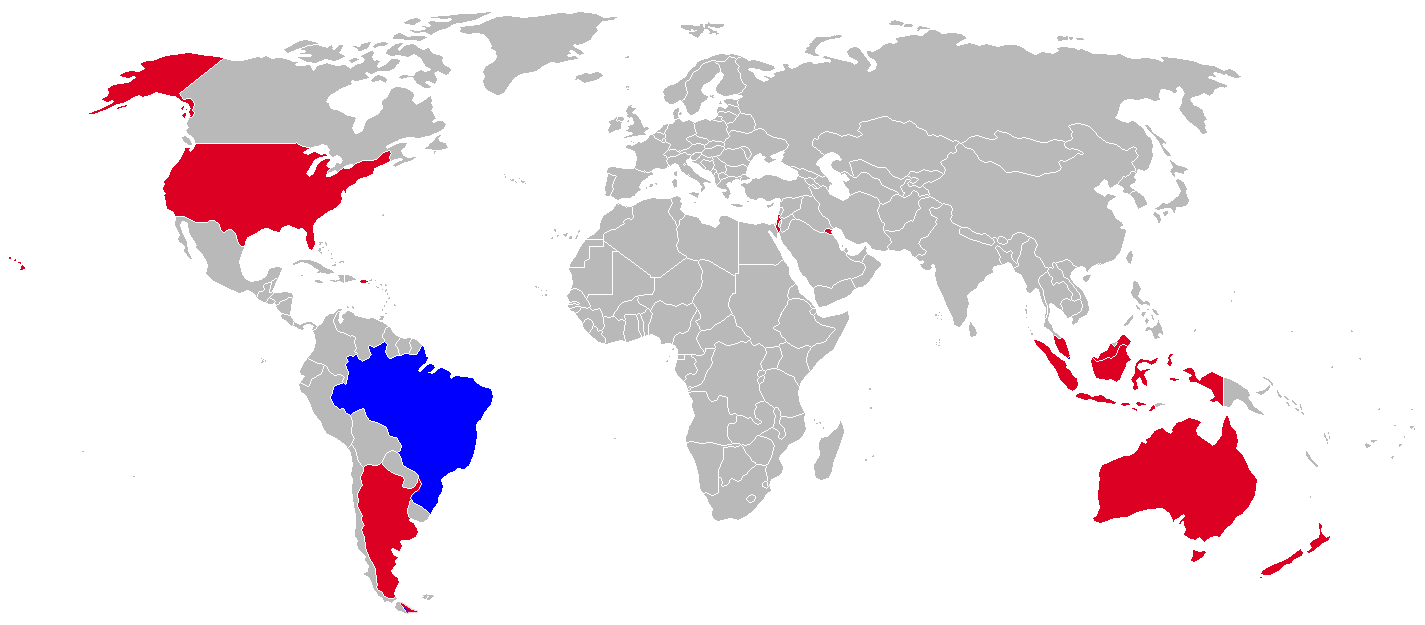
Operators: Current Former

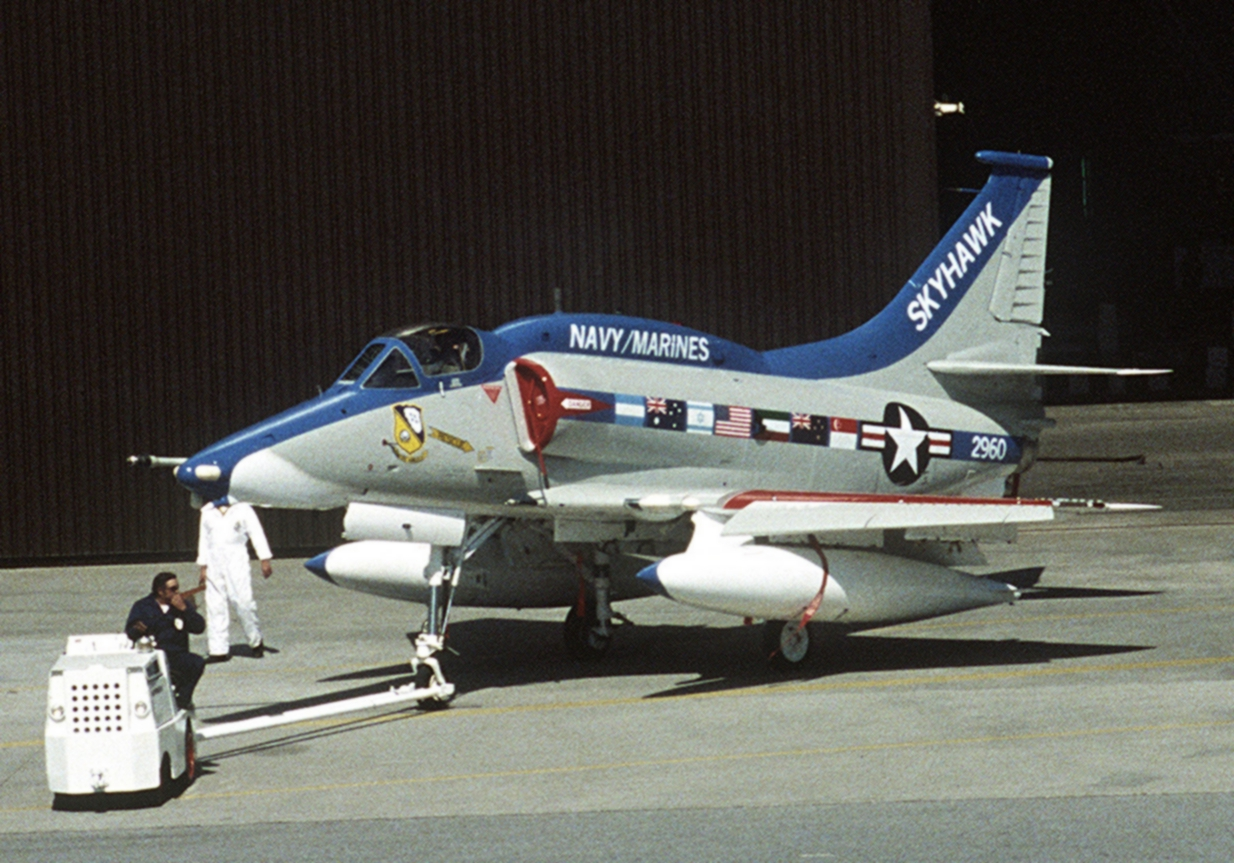
Last of the many: Skyhawk No. 2960 on 27 February 1979.

== Military operators ==
=== Argentina ===
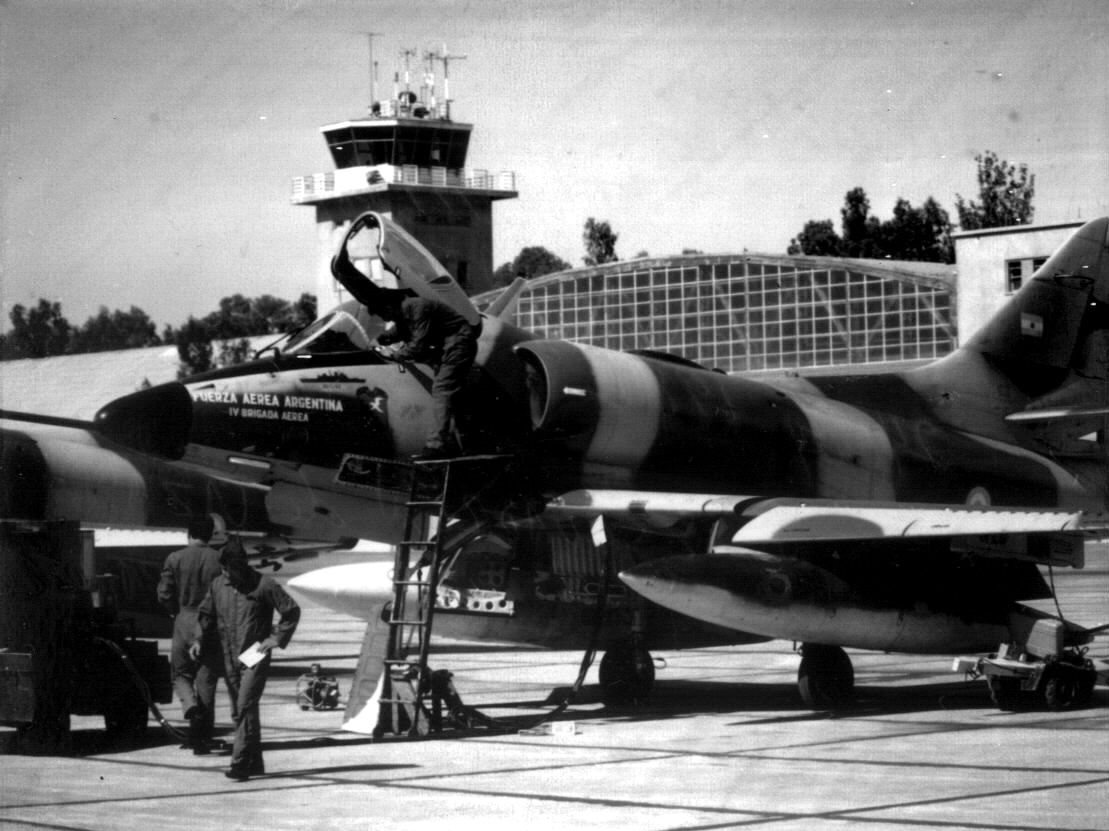
A-4C in 1982

Argentine Air Force

The Argentine Air Force used 50 A-4P (ex U.S. Navy A-4B) with V Air Brigade, and 25 A-4C with IV Air Brigade, from 1965 to 1999. 19 were lost during the Falklands War (Spanish: Guerra de las Malvinas). All were replaced by refurbished A-4Ms, designated as A-4AR Fightinghawk, in 1999. Also an unknown number of A-4E, TA-4J and A-4M are or were used as spare parts. The A-4AR was officially retired in May 2026.

Argentine Naval Aviation

The 3rd Fighter-Bomber Squadron of the Argentine Navy used 16 A-4Q (ex A-4B US Navy) for operations from the aircraft carrier ARA Veinticinco de Mayo (V-2) from 1971 to 1988. During the Falklands War they operated from land bases and three were lost.

=== Australia ===
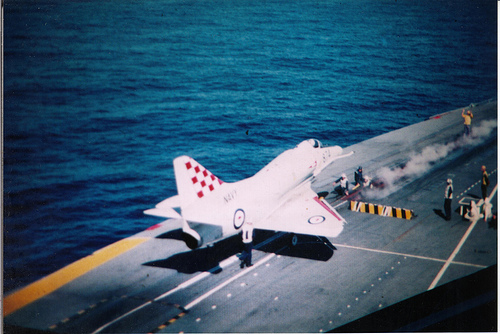
A Skyhawk on HMAS Melbourne in 1976

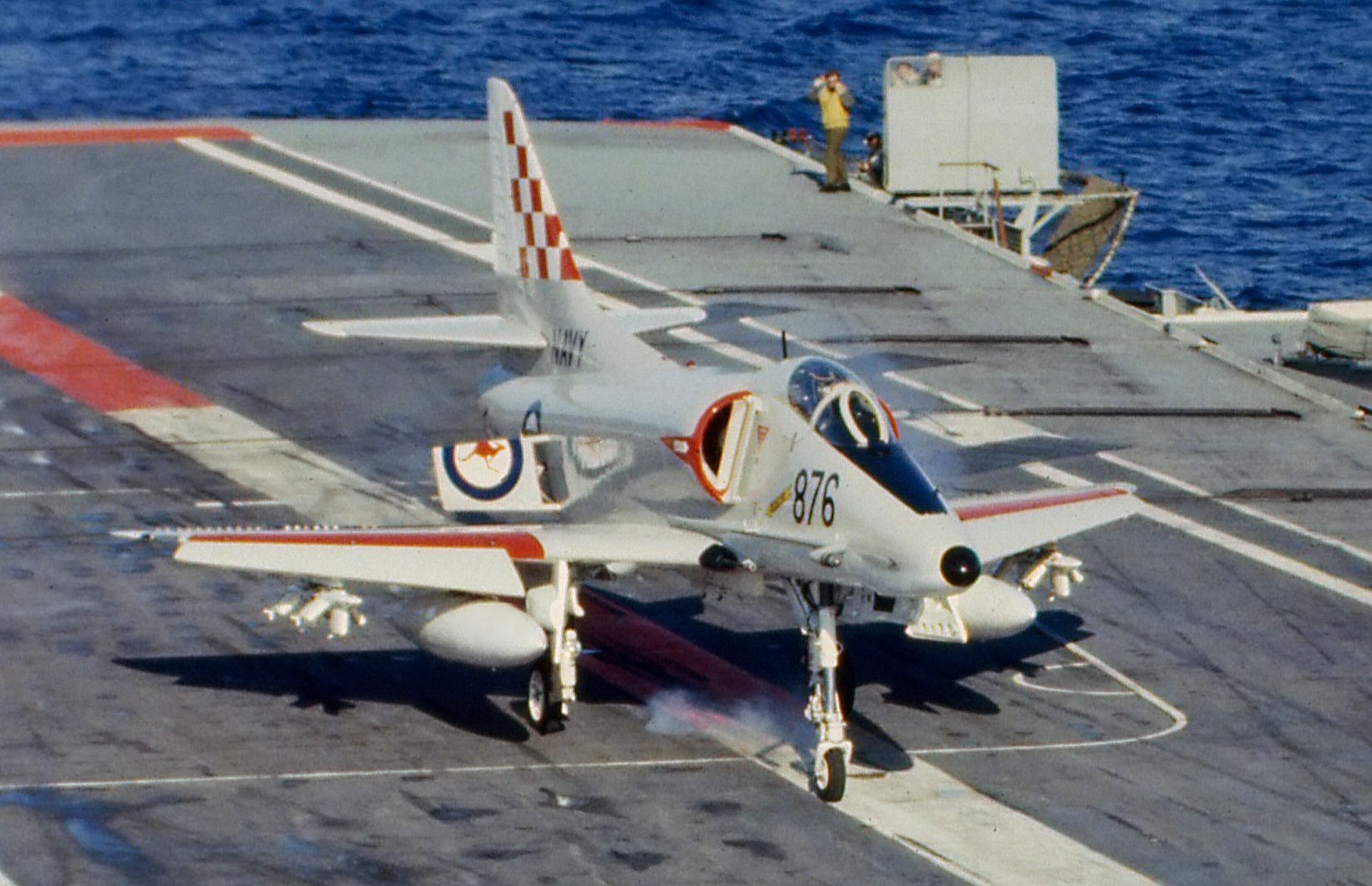
A Skyhawk lands on HMAS Melbourne, 1980

Royal Australian Navy

Australia ordered ten A-4G Skyhawks in October 1965 to replace all of the Royal Australian Navy Fleet Air Arm's de Havilland Venom fighters which operated from HMAS Melbourne, the Royal Australian Navy's only active carrier. The Australian incorporated modifications such as being fitted to carry four AIM-9 Sidewinder heat seeking air-to-air missiles – the Skyhawk was purchased primarily to serve in the air defence role, as it was the only modern high performance jet capable of operating from the deck the small World War II -surplus light carrier Melbourne , which could not operate other larger fighters of the era. These aircraft retained the strike capabilities of its US counterparts and could carry 250-pound or 500-pound bombs, 2.75-inch or 5-inch rocket pods, and other stores for use in the maritime strike, close air support, or fleet defense roles. Changes were also made to the avionics fit and the aircraft did not have the A-4F's dorsal "hump."

The first two Australian A-4Gs were handed over to the Royal Australian Navy on 26 July 1967, with all ten aircraft transported to Australia from the United States onboard HMAS Melbourne in November 1967. An order for a further eight A4-Gs and two TA-4Gs was placed in March 1970. These aircraft were former USN A-4Fs and TA-4Fs and were modified to A/TA-4G standard and arrived in Australia in August 1971 on board the troop transport HMAS Sydney. All of the A-4Gs operated from HMAS Melbourne and were based at the naval air station HMAS Albatross. The TA-4Gs could not be operated from Melbourne, as the carrier was too small to enable them to be safely operated. The Australian Skyhawks were gradually withdrawn from service from 1982 after HMAS Melbourne was decommissioned without being replaced in June 1982; the last flight took place on 30 June 1984.

Two Fleet Air Arm squadrons were equipped with A-4Gs:

- 805 Squadron (Eight A-4G and briefly two TA-4G, followed by a total of ten ex-USN A-4F and TA-4F modified to G standard. Withdrawn from use 1983). Ten aircraft lost in crashes. During the A-4G Skyhawk era the Squadron was designated VF-805 conforming with USN squadron designations. The 'VF' signaled the Fleet Defense role of the Skyhawk. V=Fixed Wing, F=Fighter. Over the life of the aircraft there were a number of different squadron aircraft paint schemes.
- VC-724 Squadron (six A-4G plus 4 TA-4G, withdrawn from use 1982). This squadron was the Skyhawk Operational Flying School where pilots were converted to the A-4G and learned the necessary operational skills. When VF-805 ceased flying A-4Gs, its aircraft were reassigned to VC-724 squadron.

Following the withdrawal of the A-4G from Australian service, eight surviving A-4G and two TA-4Gs were sold to New Zealand's Royal New Zealand Air Force in 1984 and were subsequently upgraded to A-4K specifications and later with the RNZAF "Kahu" program, with HOTAS, Maverick missile capability, and glass cockpit. Ironically, the RAN paid for some of the New Zealand aircraft to undertake target towing and maritime strike training roles.

A-4B 142871 was altered to appear like the A-4G models used by VF-805 squadron and is on display since November 1999. Displayed first as A-4G 154906 (885) and then since 2007 as A-4G 154903 (882). Has been loaned to Fleet Air Arm Museum (Australia) at HMAS Albatross by the US Department of Navy.

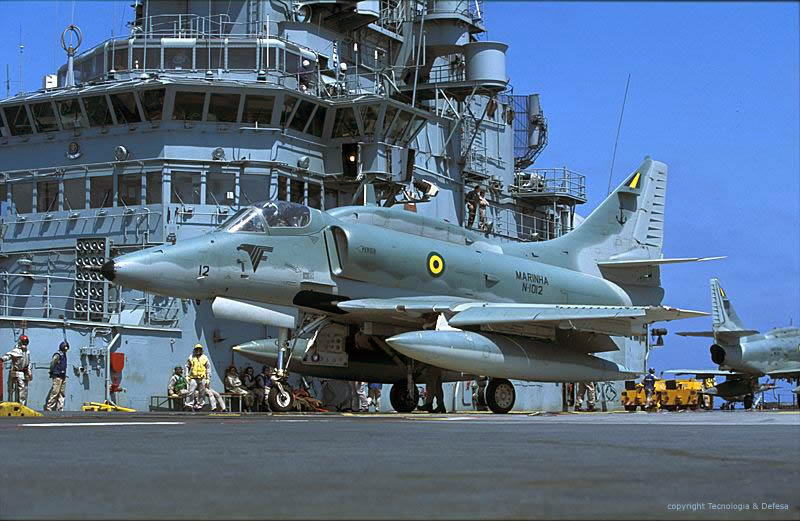
Brazilian AF-1 on São Paulo

=== Brazil ===
Brazilian Navy

- Brazil acquired 20 Kuwaiti A-4KU in 1997 for operations from the aircraft carrier NAe São Paulo, which had been bought from France. The Brazilian Navy re-designated the refurbished A-4KUs as AF-1. Three TA-4KUs were also bought for training and re-designated AF-1A. Seven A-4's (5 A-4KU and 2 TA-4KU) were modernized by EMBRAER. In 2025 four AF-1Bs and two AF-1Cs were in service.

=== Indonesia ===
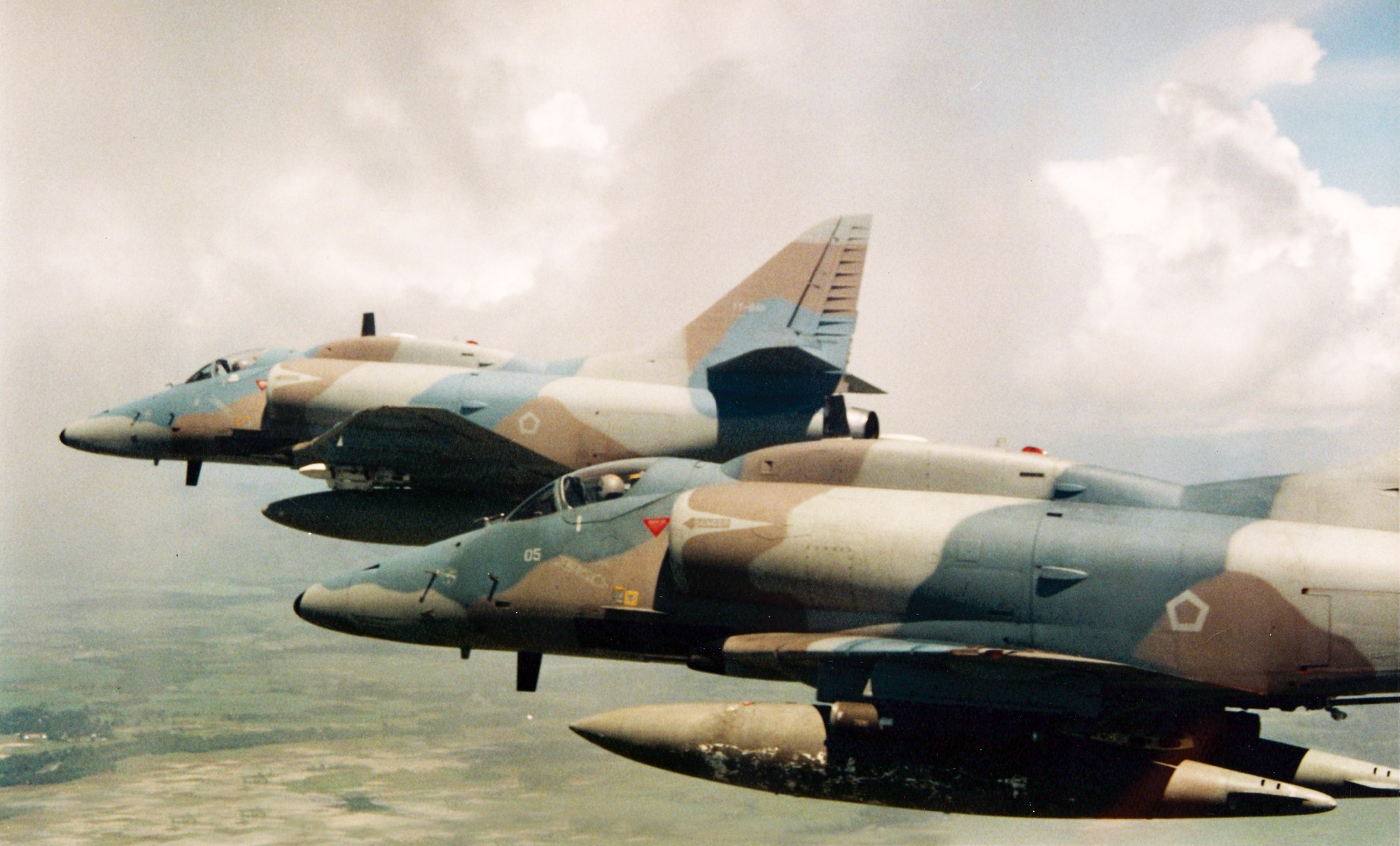
Indonesian A-4Hs.

See Also: Operation Alpha

Indonesian Air Force

- 11th Air Squadron
- 12th Air Squadron

Indonesia used 30 A-4E, two TA-4H and two TA-4Js from 1980 to 2004. The aircraft were obtained from the Israeli Air Force and some had seen previous American service in Vietnam. The first aircraft were flying from May 1980 from Halim Perdana Kusuma AFB, Jakarta.

In the 1970s the Indonesian Air Force had bought Northrop F-5 Tigers from the United States but were not allowed to use them in operations related to East Timor. As a solution Indonesia was offered 14 former Israeli Air Force A-4E Skyhawks which could be operated without restrictions. Being sensitive to be seen dealing with Israel the aircraft were actually purchased by Singapore to divert attention. The first batch of Indonesian aircrew were trained in Israel but returned to Indonesia via the United States to build up a cover story that they had been trained in the USA. As part of Operasi Alpha the first four aircraft (two A-4Es and two TA-4Hs) were shipped via Singapore and arrived in Indonesia on 4 May 1980. The rest of the aircraft were shipped in the same manner every five weeks with the last delivery in September 1980. The aircraft were first displayed in public during the Armed Forces Day on 5 October 1980. A further sixteen A-4Es were obtained in 1981 and 1982 as Operasi Alpha II. The Operasi Alpha I aircraft were used to replace the Lockheed T-33As with 11th Air Squadron at Iswahyudi Air Force Base and this unit was used initially as a transition squadron for Skyhawk training. The Operasi Alpha II aircraft were allocated to the 12th Air Squadron.

The Skyhawk continued operating for the airforce up until the 1990s and early 2000s. In the 1990s the 12th Air Squadron started to replace their Skyhawks with the BAe Hawk. The 11th Air Squadron continued to operate the Skyhawk until 2004, when they were replaced by two Russian Su-27SK and two Su-30MK aircraft.

The aircraft made its final flight on 5 August 2004, when three Skyhawks took off from Makassar in South Sulawesi and departed for Java. One landed in Madiun due to technical difficulties, while the remaining two aircraft eventually landed at Adisucipto Air Base in Yogyakarta.

=== Israel ===
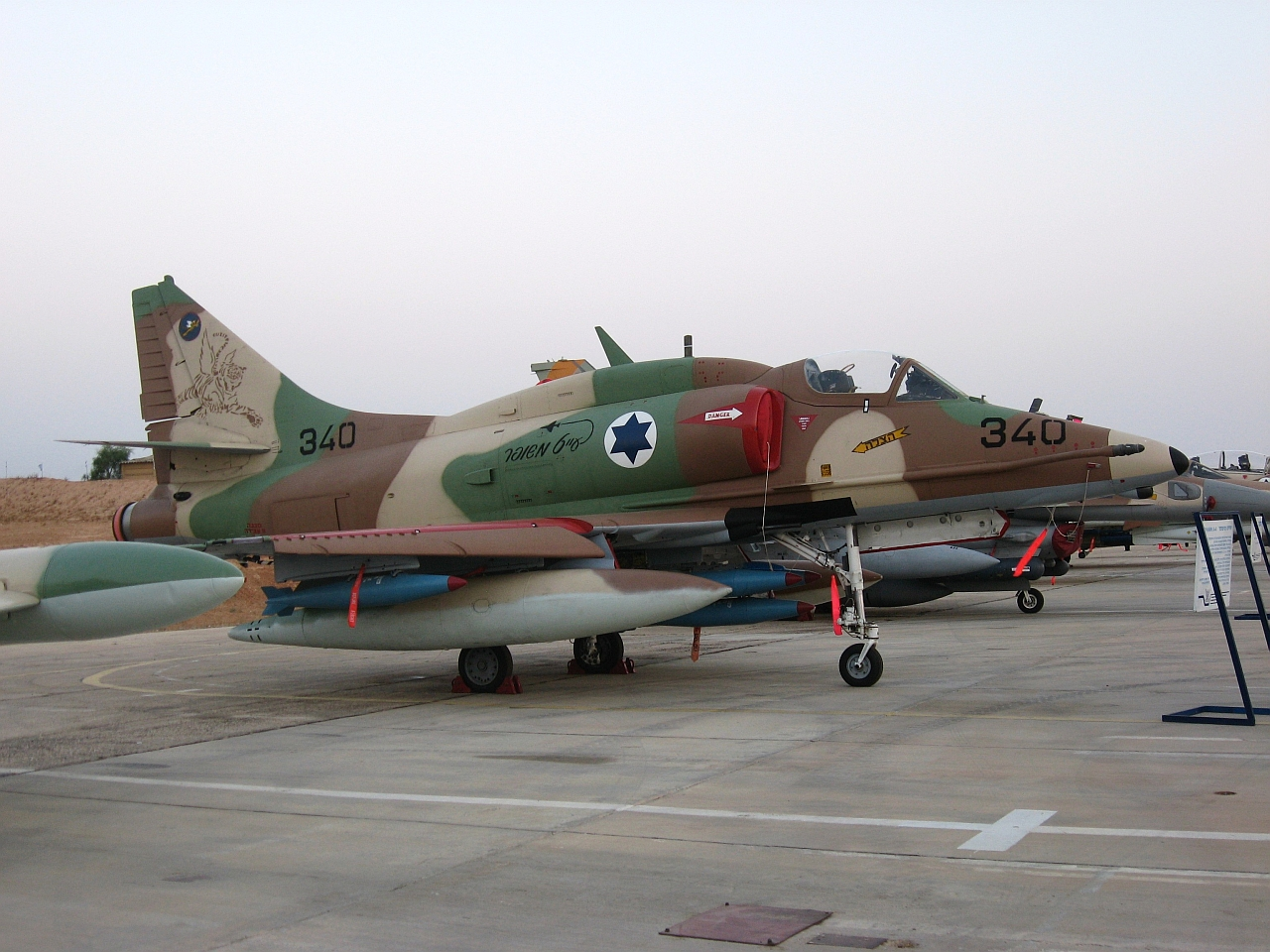
IAF A-4N Skyhawk

Israeli Air Force

- 102 Squadron (Israel)
- 109 Squadron (Israel)
- 110 Squadron (Israel)
- 115 Squadron (Israel)
- 116 Squadron (Israel)
- 140 Squadron (Israel)
- 147 Squadron (Israel)
- 149 Squadron (Israel)

The Israeli Air Force once operated 278 A-4s (46 A-4E, 90 A-4H, 117 A-4N, 25 TA-4H). The A-4H/TA-4H were delivered starting in 1968, and were immediately pressed into service in the ongoing War of Attrition. In May 1970 the type scored its sole aerial kills with the IAF when Ezra Dotan shot down a pair of Syrian MiG-17s, one using unguided air-to-ground rockets. During the Yom Kippur War the aircraft flew a total of 4695 sorties, losing 53 aircraft. These prompted the US to initiate Operation Nickel Grass which provided Israel with 46 A-4Es as replacements during the war. In 1983, an A-4 was also involved in an unusual midair collision with an F-15 Eagle. The Eagle returned to base and landed despite losing its entire right wing while the A-4 was destroyed. The remaining 50 A-4N aircraft were being used for pilot training. These were retired in 2015 and replaced by Alenia Aermacchi M-346 Master training jets.

=== Kuwait ===
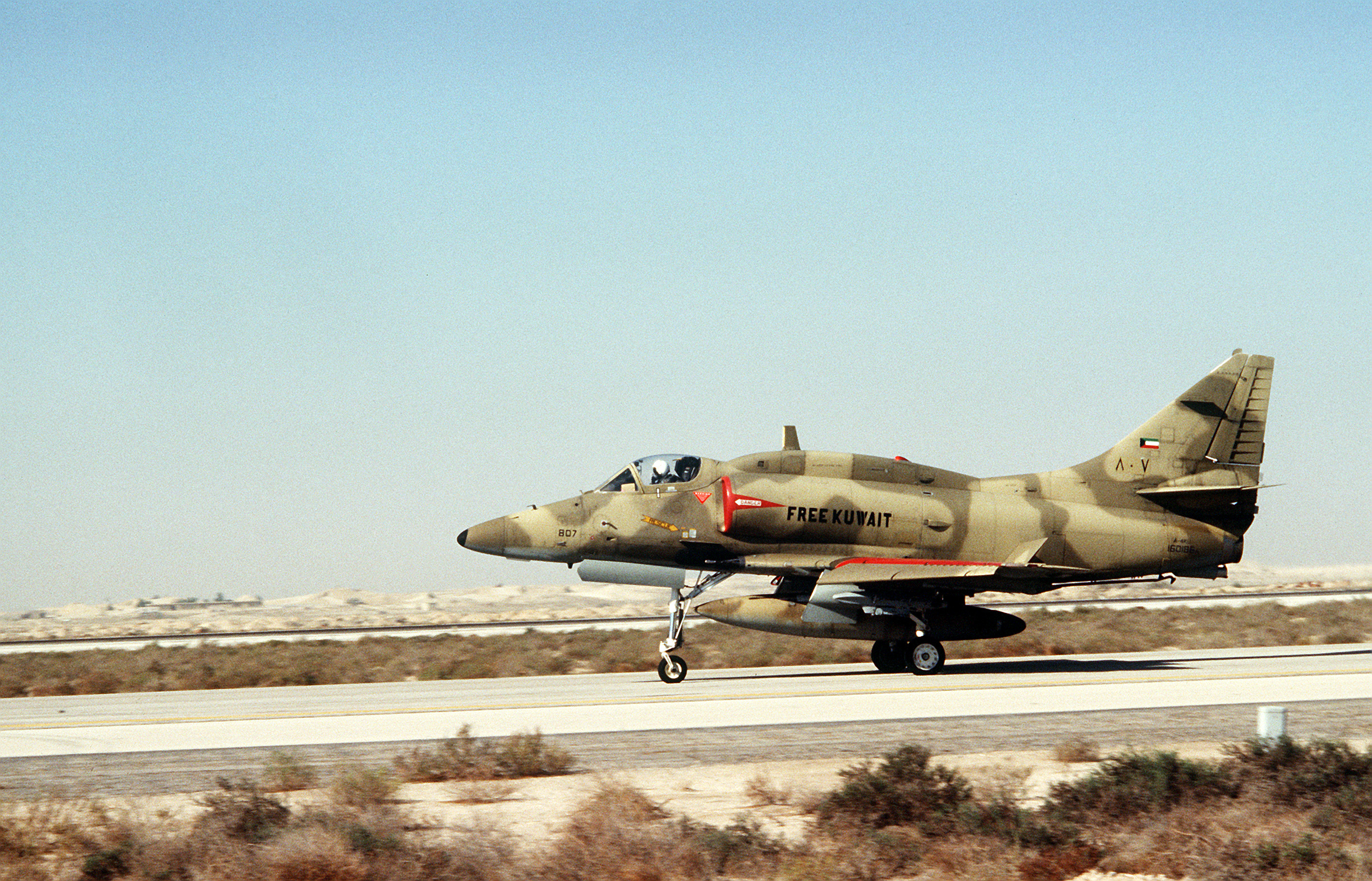
An A-4KU in 1991.

Kuwaiti Air Force

Kuwait bought 30 A-4KU and six TA-4KU in 1976 and used them until 1997. During the 1991 Gulf war one was lost in combat and twelve due to other causes. The survivors of Operation Desert Storm were replaced by F/A-18 Hornet and sold to Brazil.

=== Malaysia ===
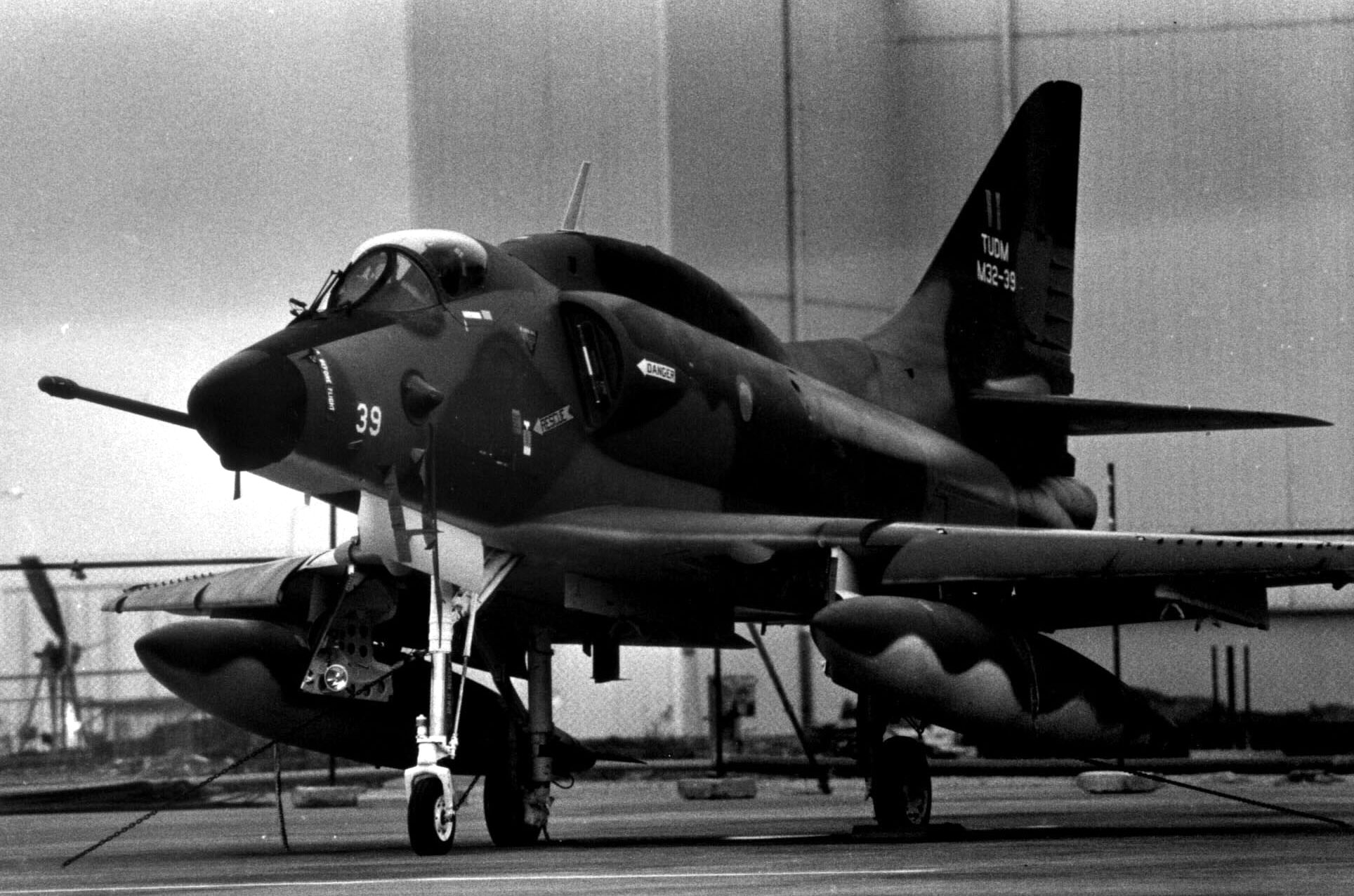
A Malaysian A-4PTM, 1986.

Royal Malaysian Air Force

The Royal Malaysian Air Force acquired a total of 88 A-4C and A-4L aircraft, although only 40 were rebuilt to A-4PTM (Peculiar To Malaysia) standard, which included a new bombing computer, body refurbishments and wiring updates. The remaining 48 aircraft were stored for spare parts. These aircraft are stored at the Kuantan Air Force base / Sultan Haji Ahmad Shah Airport on the east coast of the Malayan peninsula.

The Skyhawk has been replaced in the attack role by the more sophisticated Boeing F/A-18D Night Strike Hornet (eight purchased), BAE Systems Hawk 200 (18 acquired) and BAE Systems Hawk 100 (ten acquired).

=== New Zealand ===
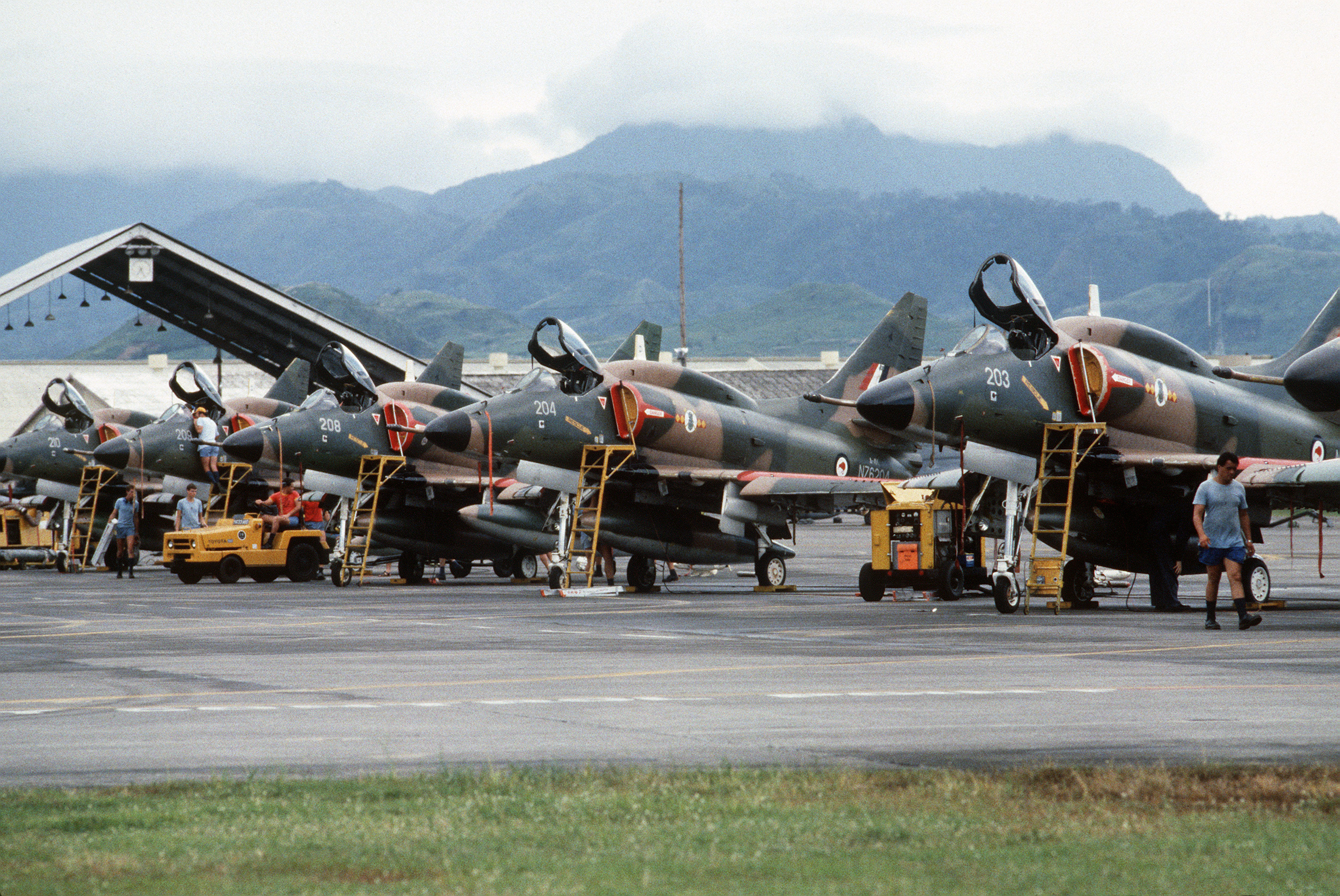
A-4Ks at Clark Air Base, 1984

Royal New Zealand Air Force

- No. 2 Squadron RNZAF
- No. 14 Squadron RNZAF – One A-4K and three TA-4Ks were allocated to No. 14 Squadron in the early 1970s for strike-conversion training.
- No. 75 Squadron RNZAF

Ten A-4K single-seaters, and four TA-4K two-seaters, were purchased by the Royal New Zealand Air Force in 1969 as English Electric Canberra replacements, and shipped to New Zealand aboard the assault carrier USS Okinawa in 1970. The A-4K is broadly comparable to the A-4F and G, although featuring extra avionics in a dorsal "hump", as adopted by later A-4Fs, cranked refuelling probe, and other minor changes. In 1984, ten ex-Australian A-4Gs were purchased. Under project Kahu, all aircraft updated to the A-4K Kahu standard, essentially by adopting the avionics from the F-16 Fighting Falcon, giving them the ability to use laser-guided bombs, as well as AGM-65 Maverick and AIM-9L Sidewinder missiles. Kahu is Māori for hawk. Miniaturization enabled the hump to be removed from the older New Zealand aircraft at the same time. The A-4Ks operated from Ohakea in New Zealand and Nowra in Australia equipped 2 and 75 Squadron RNZAF.

The survivors were retired in 2001, and were to be sold in 2005 to a private US flight training firm in a $150 million deal. That transaction did not go through, but the aircraft were subsequently purchased in 2011/2012 by USA based defense contractor, Draken International. The aircraft are currently based at their Lakeland, FL facility.

=== Singapore ===
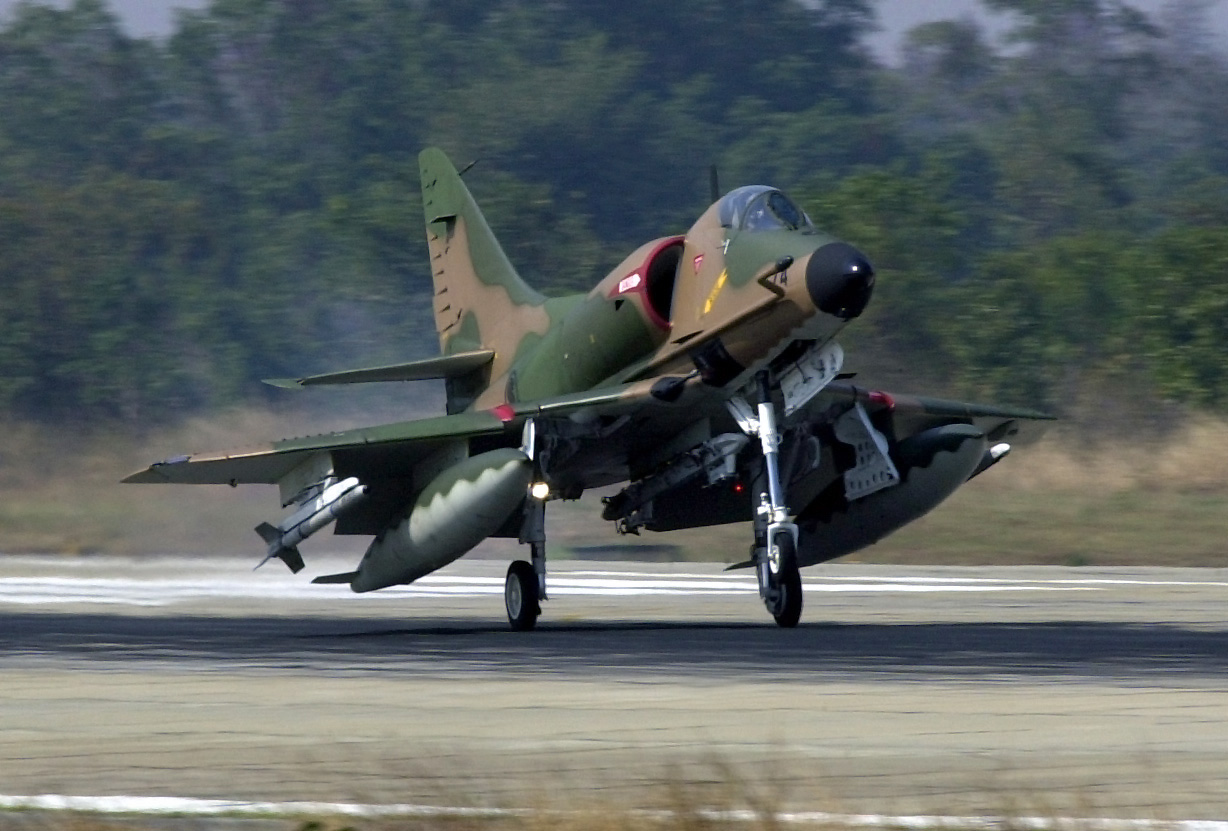
an A-4SU in 2002.

Republic of Singapore Air Force

In total, around 150 airframes, all A-4Bs and Cs, were purchased by Singapore. The first batch joined the Republic of Singapore Air Force (RSAF) in 1974. Some were modified in the late 1980s to A-4SU and TA-4SU standard with General Electric F404 engines and modernized avionics. With a few used as training aircraft based at the BA 120 Cazaux airbase in France.

RSAF units that flew the A-4 before retirement:

- 142 Squadron "Gryphons" – disbanded in 2004.
- 143 Squadron "Phoenix" – converted to F-16C/D in 2003.
- 145 Squadron "Hornets" – converted to F-16D+ in 2004.
- 150 Squadron "Falcons" – training squadron for Advance Jet Training (AJT) based at BA 120 Cazaux airbase in France, converted to M-346 in 2012.

=== United States ===
Units that flew the A-4 before retirement:

==== United States Navy ====
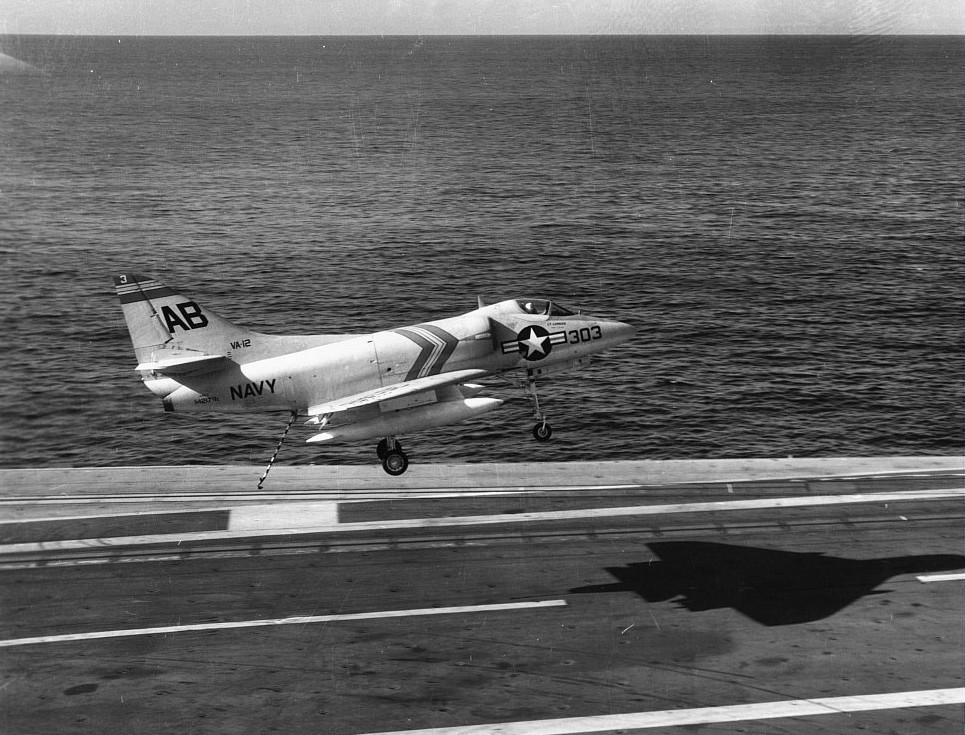
An A4D-1 of VA-12 in 1957.

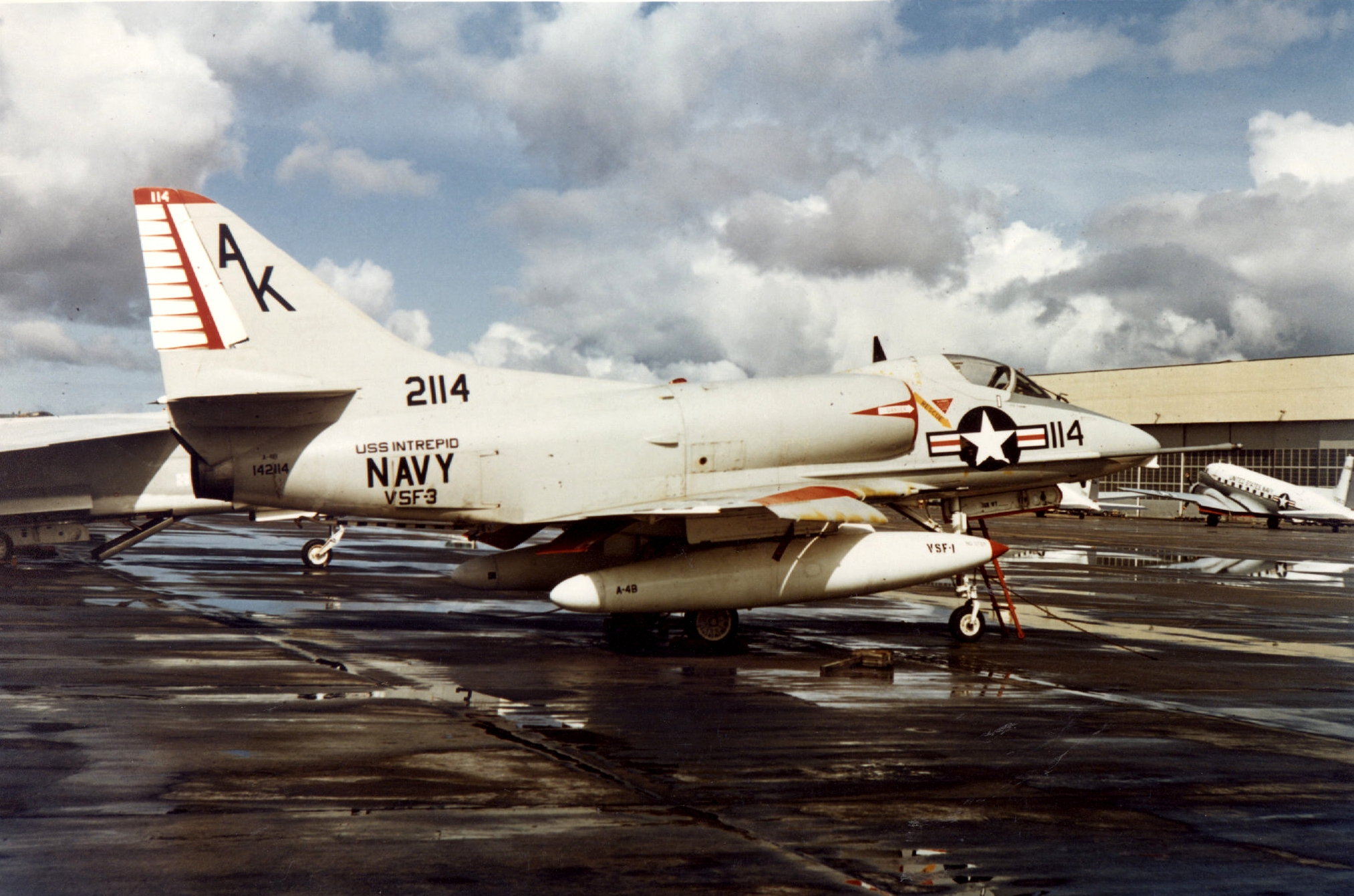
A-4B of VSF-3 in 1967.

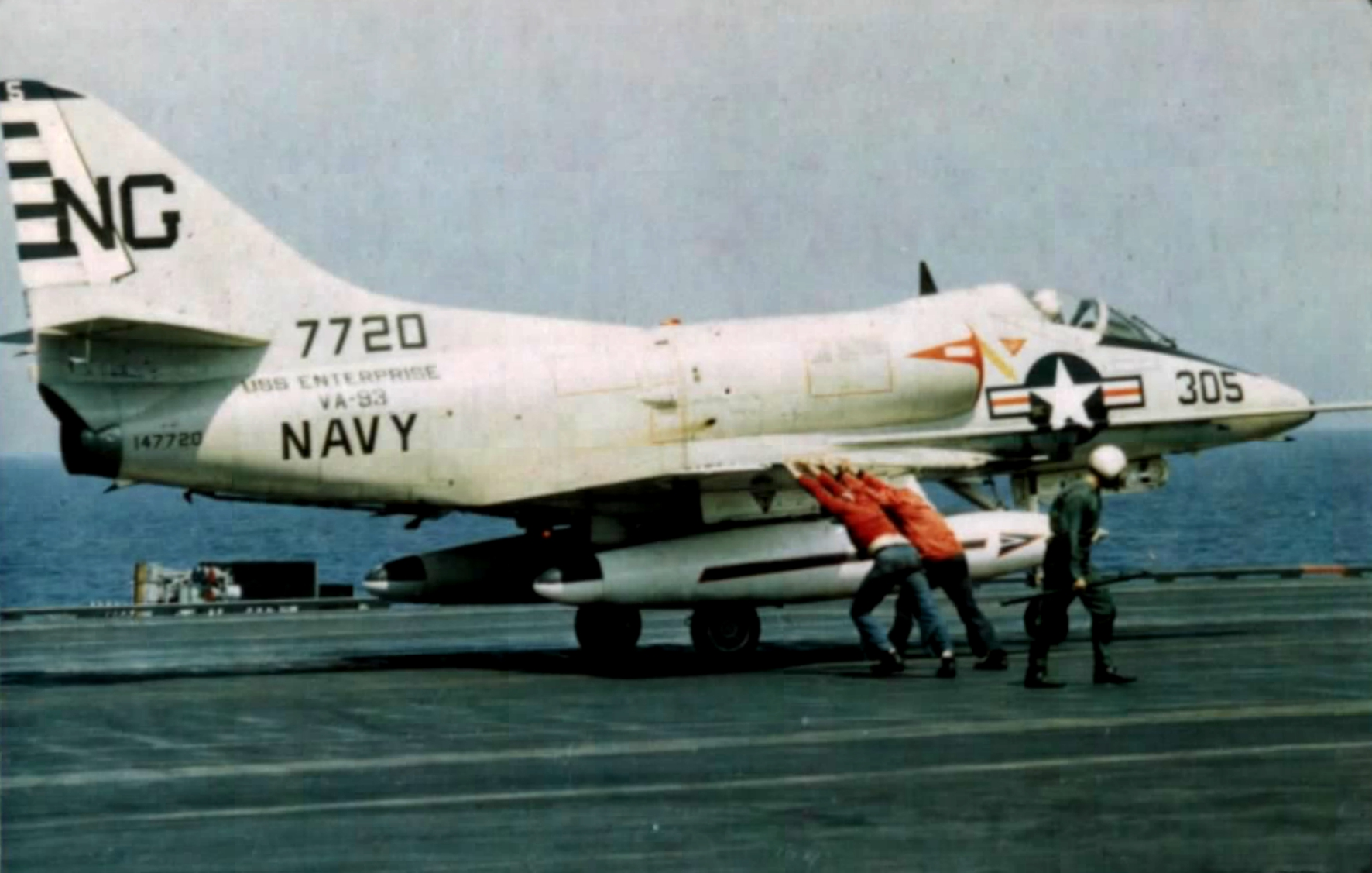
A-4C of VA-93 in 1966.

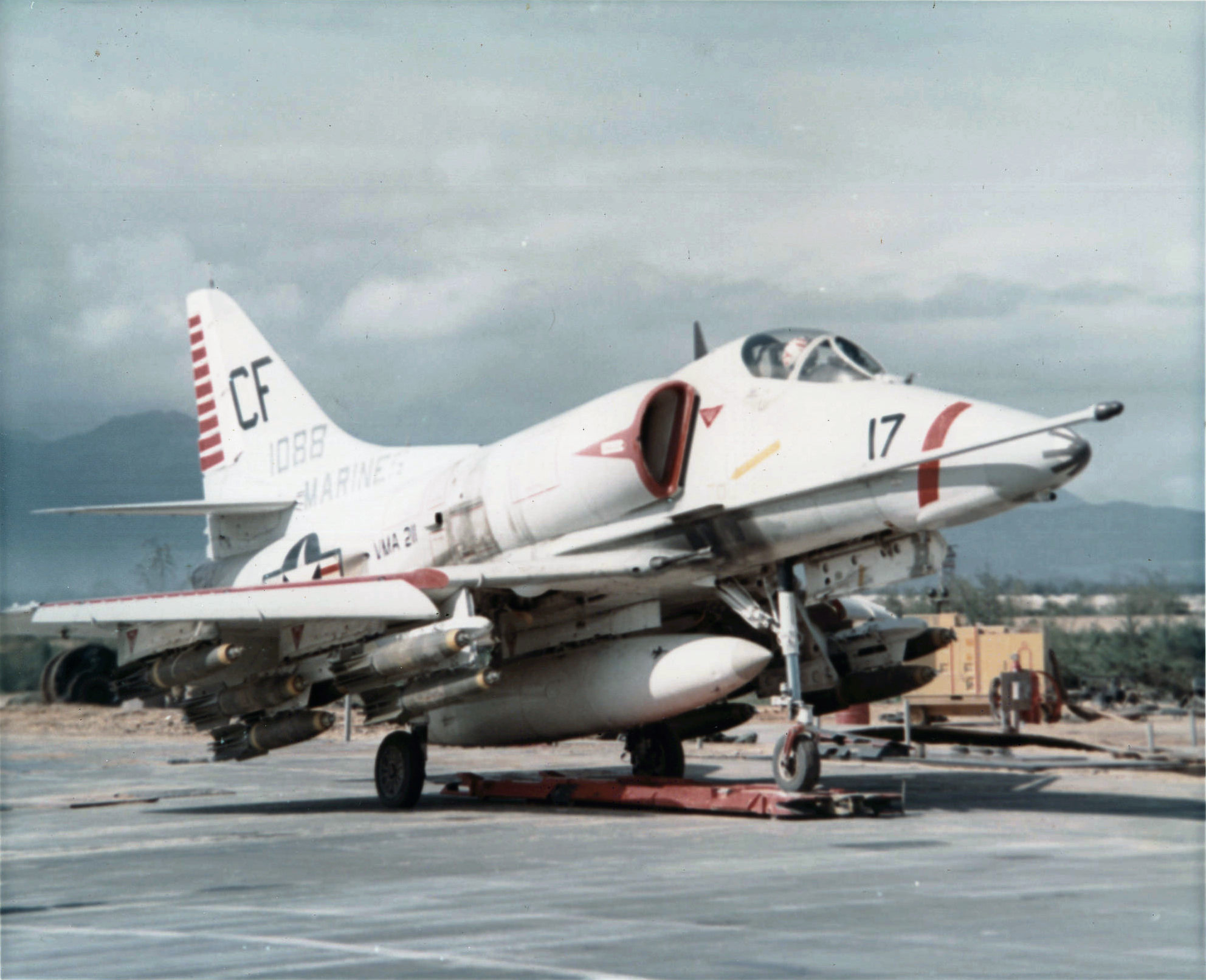
A VMA-211 A-4E at Chu Lai, Vietnam, 1968.

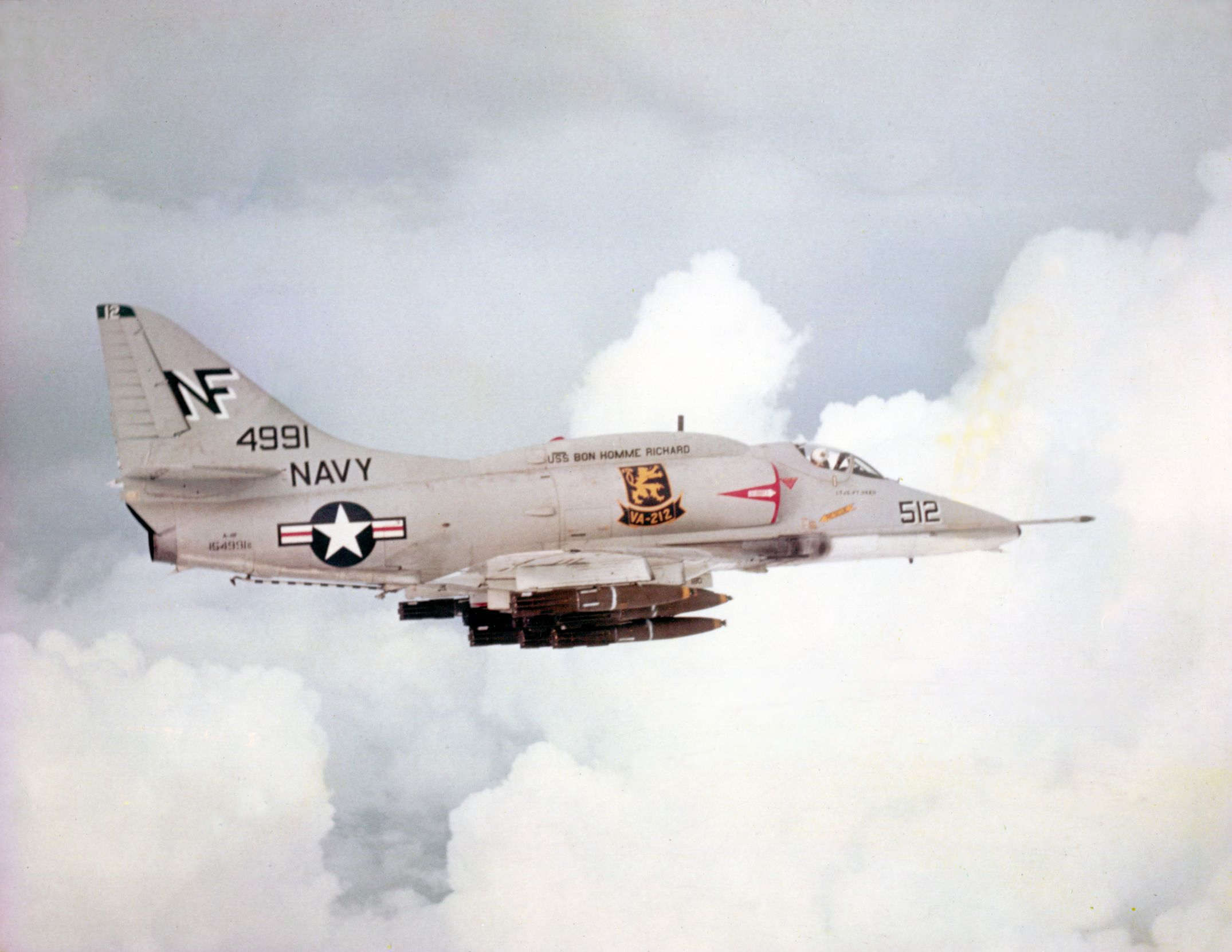
An A-4F of VA-212, 1968.

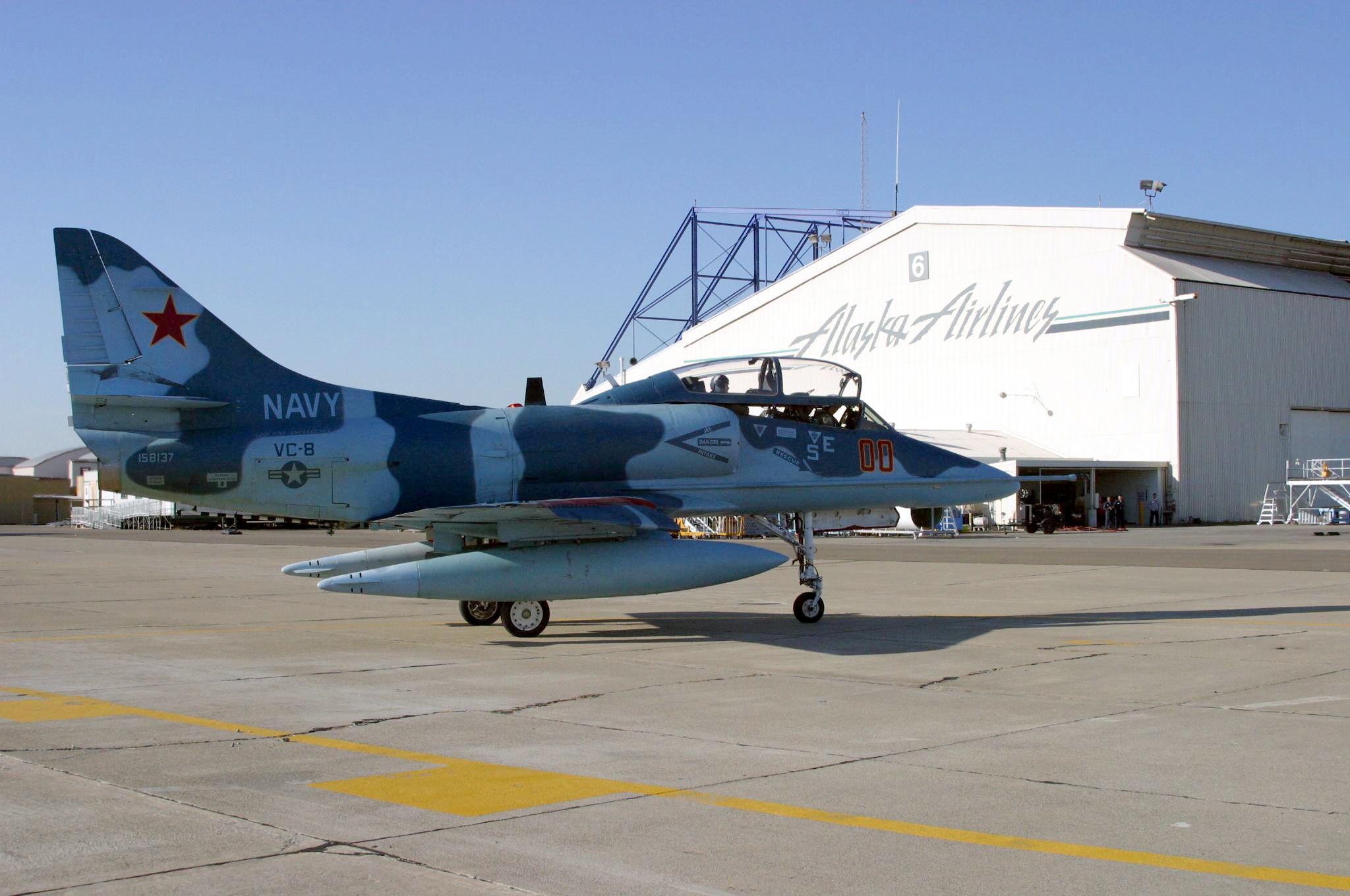
The last U.S. Navy Skyhawks: a TA-4J of VC-8, 2003.

- VA-12
- VA-15
- VA-22
- VA-23
- VA-34
- VA-36
- VA-43
- VA-44
- VA-45
- VA-46
- VA-55
- VA-56
- VA-64
- VA-66
- VA-72
- VA-76
- VA-81
- VA-83
- VA-86
- VA-93
- VA-94
- VA-95
- VA-106
- VA-112
- VA-113
- VA-125
- VA-126
- VA-127
- VA-133
- VA-134
- VA-144
- VA-146
- VA-152
- VA-153
- VA-155
- VA-163
- VA-164
- VA-172
- VA-176
- VA-192
- VA-195
- VA-212
- VA-216
- VAQ-33
- VC-1
- VC-2
- VC-5
- VC-7
- VC-8
- VC-10
- VC-12
- VC-13
- VF-171
- VFAW-3
- VSF-1
- VSF-3
- VSF-76
- VSF-86
- VT-7
- VT-21
- VT-22
- VT-23
- VT-24
- VT-25
- VT-86 (NAS Pensacola through 1989)
- RVAH-3
- Navy Fighter Weapons School
- Naval Air Development Center
- Naval Air Test Center
- Naval Test Pilot School
- Naval Weapons Evaluation Facility

==== United States Marine Corps ====
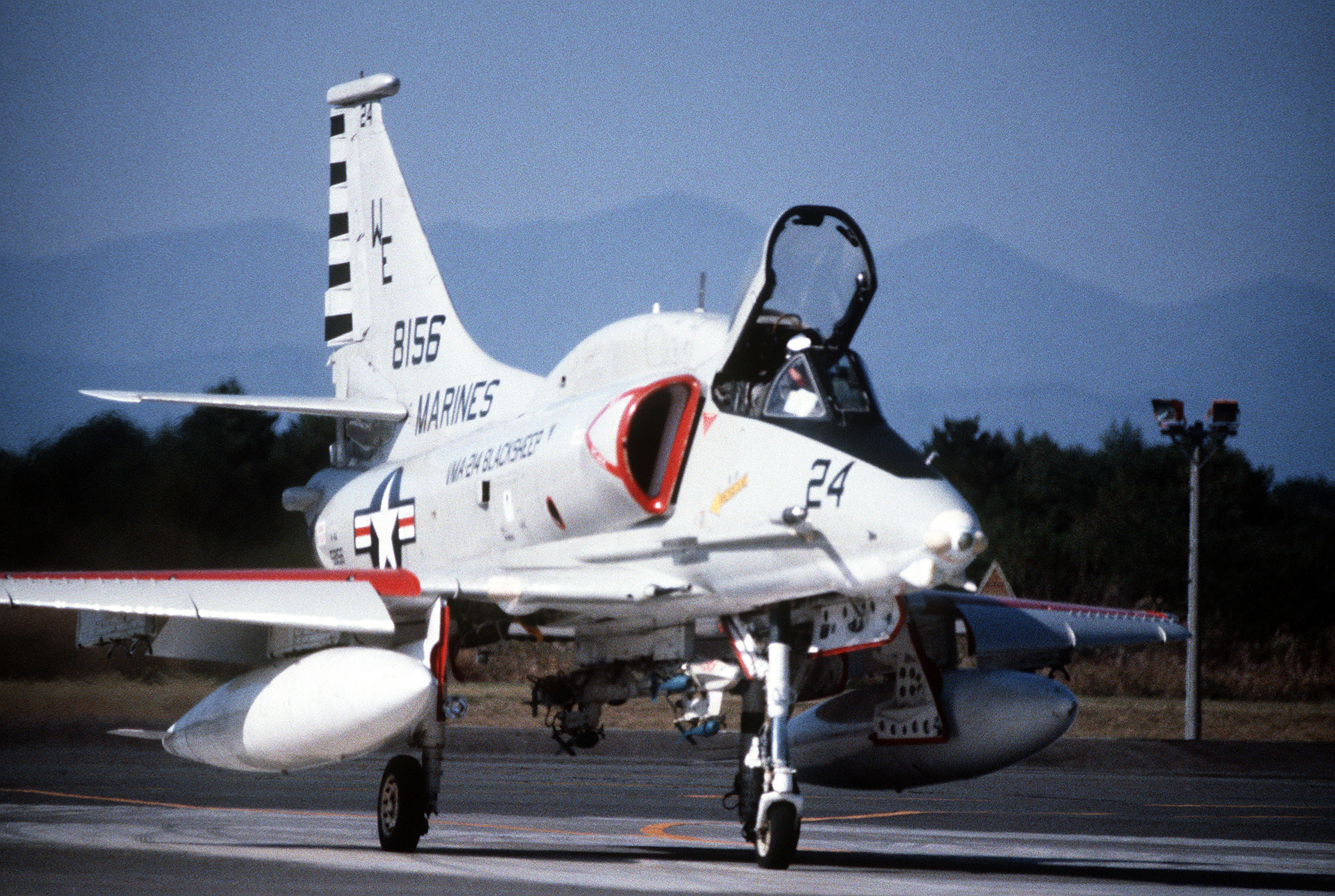
A VMA-214 A-4M in 1980.

- VMA-124 Whistling Death
- VMA-131 Diamond Backs
- VMA-133 Dragons
- VMA-211 Wake Island Avengers (Now flying F-35B Lightning II)
- VMA-214 Black Sheep (Now flying F-35B Lightning II)
- VMA-223 Bulldogs (Now flying AV-8B Harrier II)
- VMA-225 Vagabonds (Now VMFA-225 operating the F/A-18 Hornet)
- VMA-311 Tomcats (Now flying F-35C Lightning II)
- VMA-322 Fighting Gamecocks
- VMA-324 Devildogs
- VMA-331 Bumblebees
- H&MS-12 Outlaws (OA-4M)
- MAG-42 Flying Gators

VMA-121 "Green Knights"

==== United States Navy Reserve ====
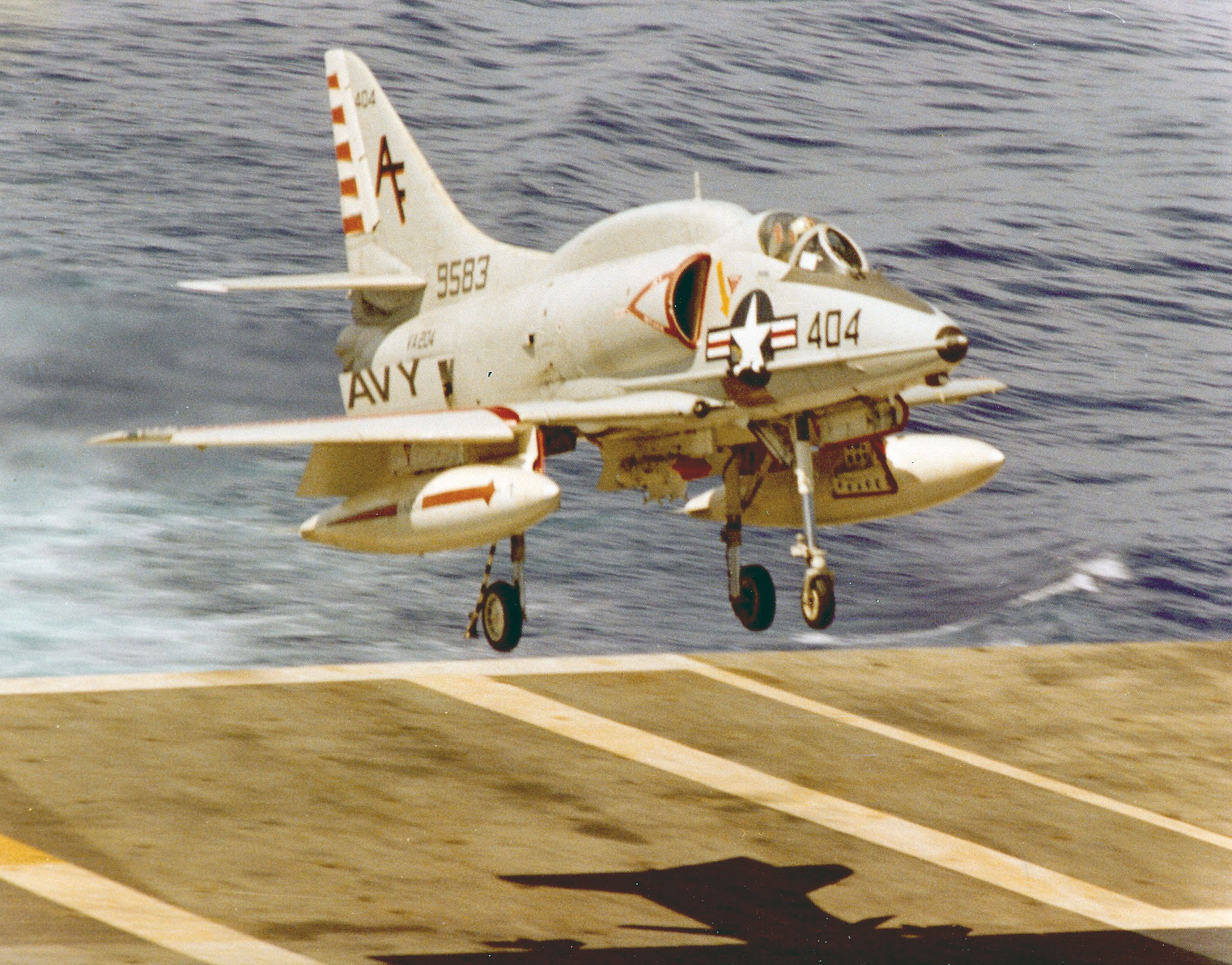
A VA-204 A-4L in 1971.

- VA-203
- VA-204
- VA-205
- VA-209
- VA-210
- VA-303
- VA-304
- VA-305
- VA-776
- VA-831
- VA-873
- VFC-12
- VFC-13

== Civilian operators ==
=== United States ===
Legionnaire International Ltd Co.

The Texas-based company operates 4 A-4L model aircraft based out of North Texas Regional Airport (formerly Perrin AFB). The aircraft are primarily operated for flight testing activities, training, and demonstrations.

Top Aces

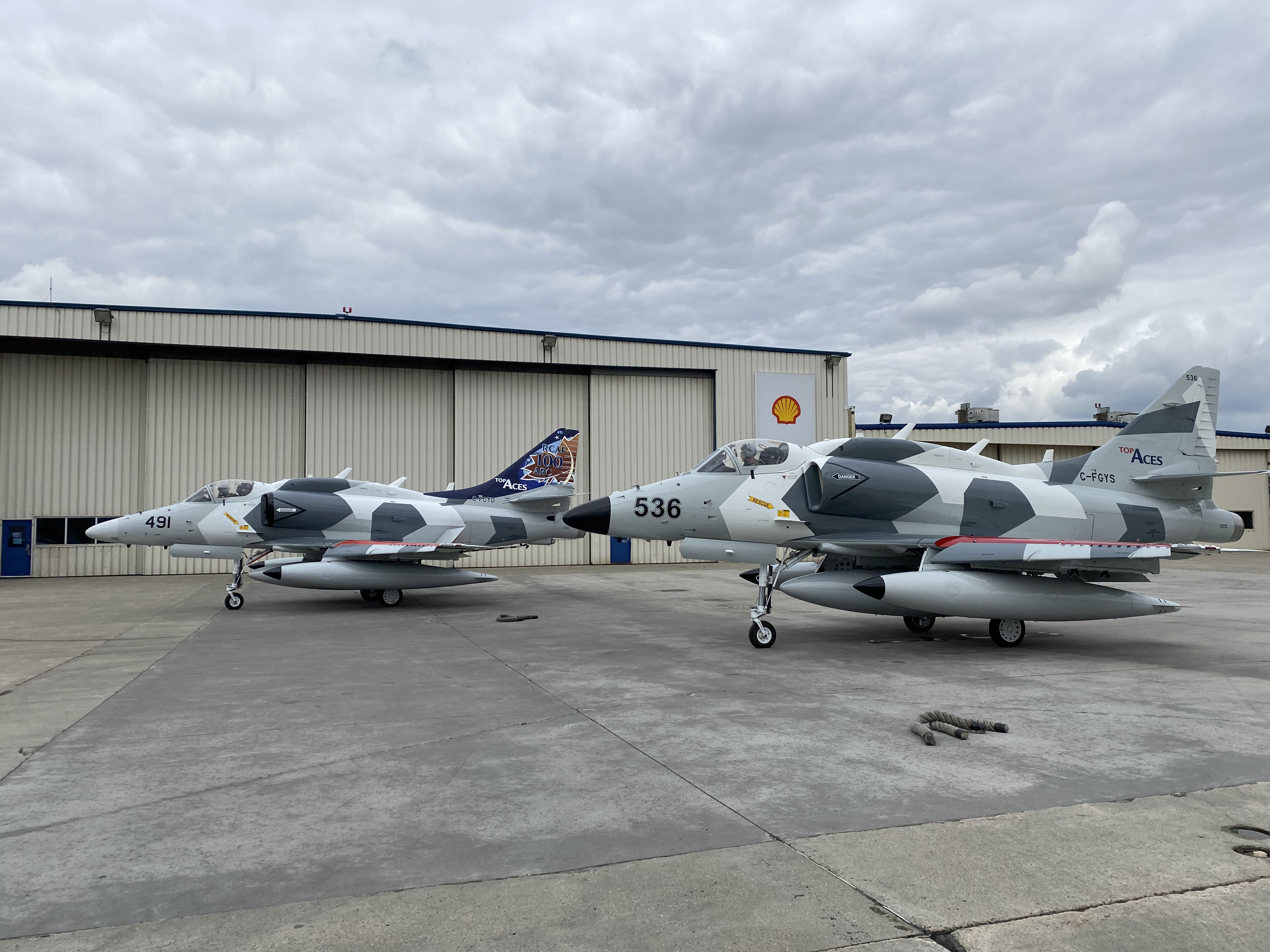
Two Top Aces A-4N in 2024.

Canadian owned company Top Aces, (formerly known as Advanced Training Systems International), based at Phoenix-Mesa Gateway Airport purchased ten A-4Ns and three TA-4Js from Israel in 2000. They are available for a variety of training and testing tasks, including Dissimilar air combat training, pilot training (providing lead-in Fighter training for the pilots of the United Arab Emirates' F-16E/Fs) and providing a high speed platform for test and evaluation purposes. One aircraft was destroyed in a crash in 2003 and a further two sold in 2006.

Collings Foundation

The Massachusetts-based non-profit organization operates one ex-US Navy TA-4J N524CF (was BuNo 153524) as part of its "living history" flight program. It was acquired from AMARC in 2004, and is now based out of Houston, Texas. The organization offers licensed pilots the opportunity to purchase dual instruction time in the aircraft.

Draken International

The Florida-based Aggressor Squadron operates eleven A-4 Skyhawks formerly of the Royal New Zealand Air Force.

=== Germany ===
BAE Systems provides four former Israeli A-4Ns as target tugs for the German Air Force since 2001, replacing North American F-100 Super Sabres. The Skyhawks are operated by the BAE subsidiary E.I.S. Aircraft GmbH at Wittmund, the base of the Jagdgeschwader 71. In 2007 2 more A-4Ns were added.

== See also ==
- Douglas A-4 Skyhawk
- A-4AR Fightinghawk
- A-4SU Super Skyhawk
- List of preserved Douglas A-4 Skyhawks
