= 131 Squadron =

131 Squadron or 131st Squadron may refer to:

- No. 131 Squadron RCAF, see list of Royal Canadian Air Force squadrons
- No. 131 Squadron RAF, United Kingdom
- 131 Squadron (Israel)
- 131 Squadron, Republic of Singapore Air Force, see list of Republic of Singapore Air Force squadrons
- 131st Aero Squadron, United States Army Air Service
- 131st Fighter Squadron, United States Air Force
- 131st Rescue Squadron, United States Air Force
- VAQ-131, United States Navy
- VF-131, United States Navy
- VP-131, United States Navy
- VMA-131, United States Marine Corps
