= VA-133 (U.S. Navy) =

Attack Squadron 133
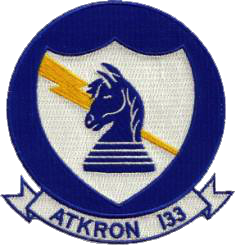
- VA-133 insignia
- Active: 21 August 1961 – 1 October 1962
- Country: United States
- Branch: United States Navy
- Type: Attack
- Nickname(s): Blue Knights

Aircraft flown
- Attack: A-4B Skyhawk

VA-133 was a short-lived Attack Squadron of the United States Navy, nicknamed the Blue Knights. It was established on 21 August 1961 and disestablished a year later, on 1 October 1962. It was based at NAS Cecil Field and flew A4D-2 Skyhawk aircraft.

== Operational history ==
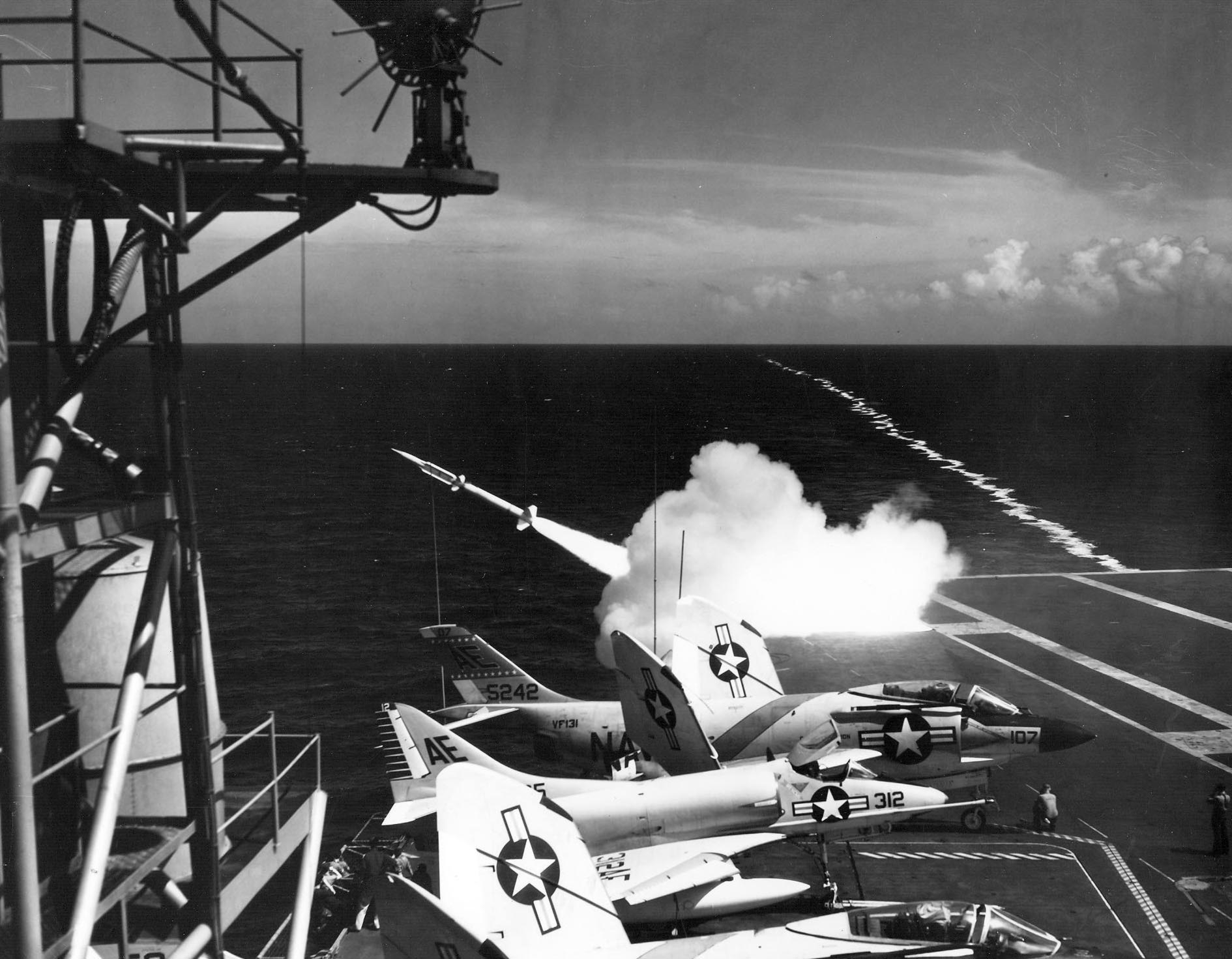
An RIM-2 Terrier SAM missile is fired by USS Constellation in 1962. In the foreground are aircraft from VF-131 and VA-133

- August 1961: The squadron was established as part of a new Air Group to increase the strength of the fleet as a result of the Berlin Crisis of 1961.
- 8–19 February 1962: A squadron detachment was aboard USS Constellation for carrier trials and in a standby status for possible assistance during Project Mercury, the launching of Lieutenant Colonel John H. Glenn, USMC, in Mercury spacecraft Friendship 7.
- March–May 1962: The squadron participated in Constellation's shakedown cruise in the Caribbean.

== See also ==
- List of squadrons in the Dictionary of American Naval Aviation Squadrons
- Second VA-134 (U.S. Navy), a "sister squadron"
- Attack aircraft
- List of inactive United States Navy aircraft squadrons
- History of the United States Navy
