= VFA-303 =

Strike Fighter Squadron 303
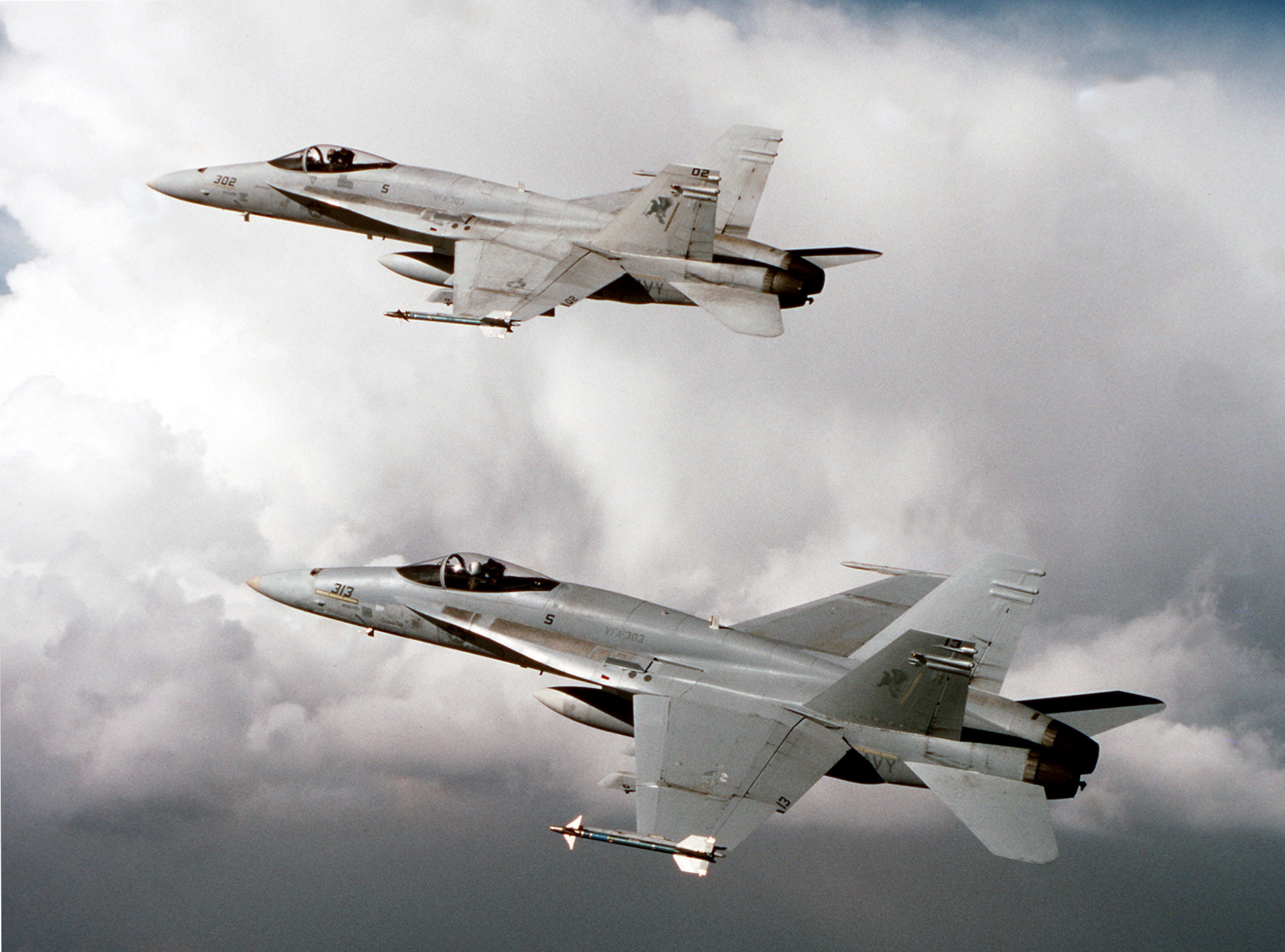
- VFA-303 F/A-18s in 1989
- Active: 1 July 1970 – 31 December 1994
- Country: United States
- Branch: United States Navy Reserve
- Type: Attack
- Part of: Inactive
- Nickname(s): Golden Hawks

Aircraft flown
- Attack: A-4 Skyhawk; A-7A/B Corsair; F/A-18 Hornet

VFA-303, nicknamed the Golden Hawks, was a Strike Fighter Squadron of the U.S. Navy Reserve. It was established as Attack Squadron VA-303 on 1 July 1970 at NAS Alameda, California as part of a reorganization of the reserves intended to increase the combat readiness of the Naval Air Reserve Force. On 1 January 1984, it was redesignated VFA-303 and relocated to NAS Lemoore. It was disestablished on 31 December 1994.

== Operational history ==
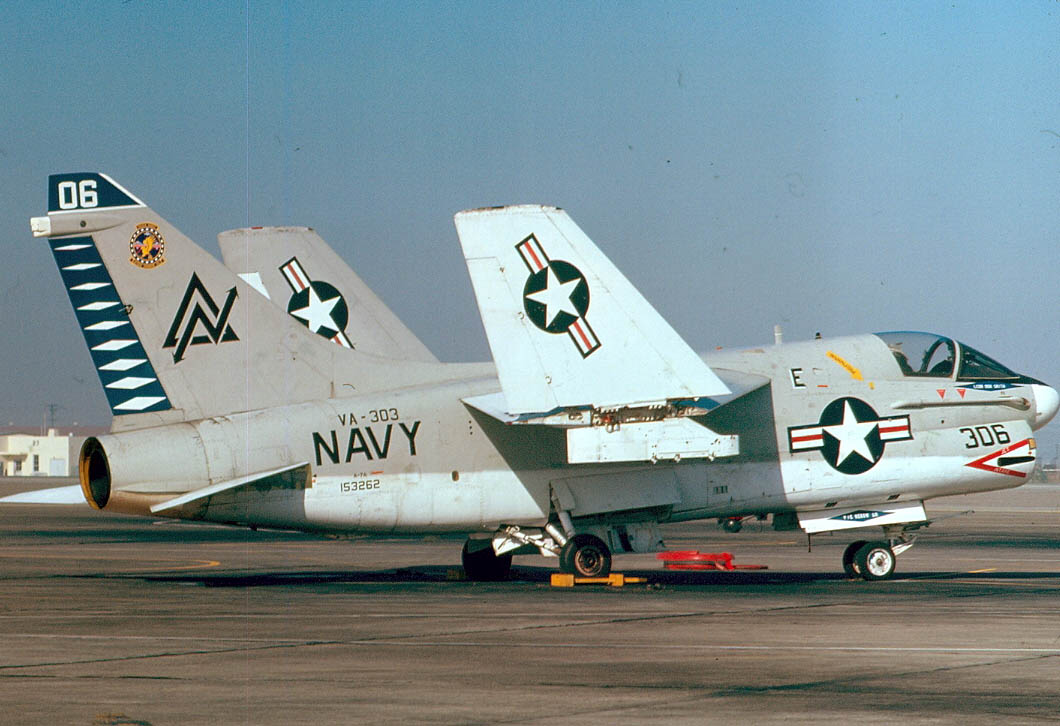
VA-303 A-7A at NAS Alameda, December 1974

In April 1971, VA-303 was the first reserve squadron to transition to the A-7A Corsair II. In November 1975, it deployed aboard USS Ranger for the annual active duty training and as part of CVWR-30's tactical air mobilization test, and for the operational readiness exercise/inspection to ensure the squadron was seaworthy and combat ready.

On 19 October 1985, VFA-303 was the first reserve squadron to transition to the F/A-18 Hornet. On 25 September 20 Nov 1990, a detachment of the squadron's F/A-18 Hornets and personnel, along with VFA-305, joined CVW-11 aboard USS Abraham Lincoln for her transit from Norfolk to Alameda, via Cape Horn.

In November 1990, a detachment of squadron aircraft and personnel deployed to NAWS China Lake in direct support of Operation Desert Shield. Provided critical real world electronic warfare test and evaluation missions requiring aircraft fully functional with electronic warfare, AGM-88 HARM missile and electronic countermeasure suites. In early 1993 the squadron added the roles of Adversary and Fleet Support to its primary mission.

== Aircraft assigned ==
The squadron operated the following aircraft, with the years received as shown:

- A-4 Skyhawk (1970)
- A-7 Corsair: A-7A (1971), A-7B (1977)
- F/A-18 Hornet (1985)

== See also ==
- History of the United States Navy
- List of inactive United States Navy aircraft squadrons
