= Second VA-64 (U.S. Navy) =

VA-64
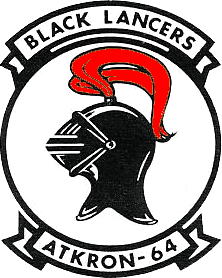
- Disbanded: 7 November 1969
- Branch: United States Navy
- Type: Attack
- Nickname(s): Black Lancers
- Colors: White / Black
- Engagements: USS Liberty incident Cuban Quarantine
- Decorations: Armed Forces Expeditionary Medal

Aircraft flown
- Attack: A4D-2N/A-4C and A4D-2

VA-64 was an Attack Squadron of the U.S. Navy. It was established on 1 July 1961, and disestablished on 7 November 1969. The squadron was known as the Black Lancers, and was the second squadron to carry the VA-64 designation. It was formed to provide an air defense capability for Carrier AntiSubmarine Air Groups. The squadron flew A4D-2N/A-4C and A4D-2 aircraft.

== Operational history ==
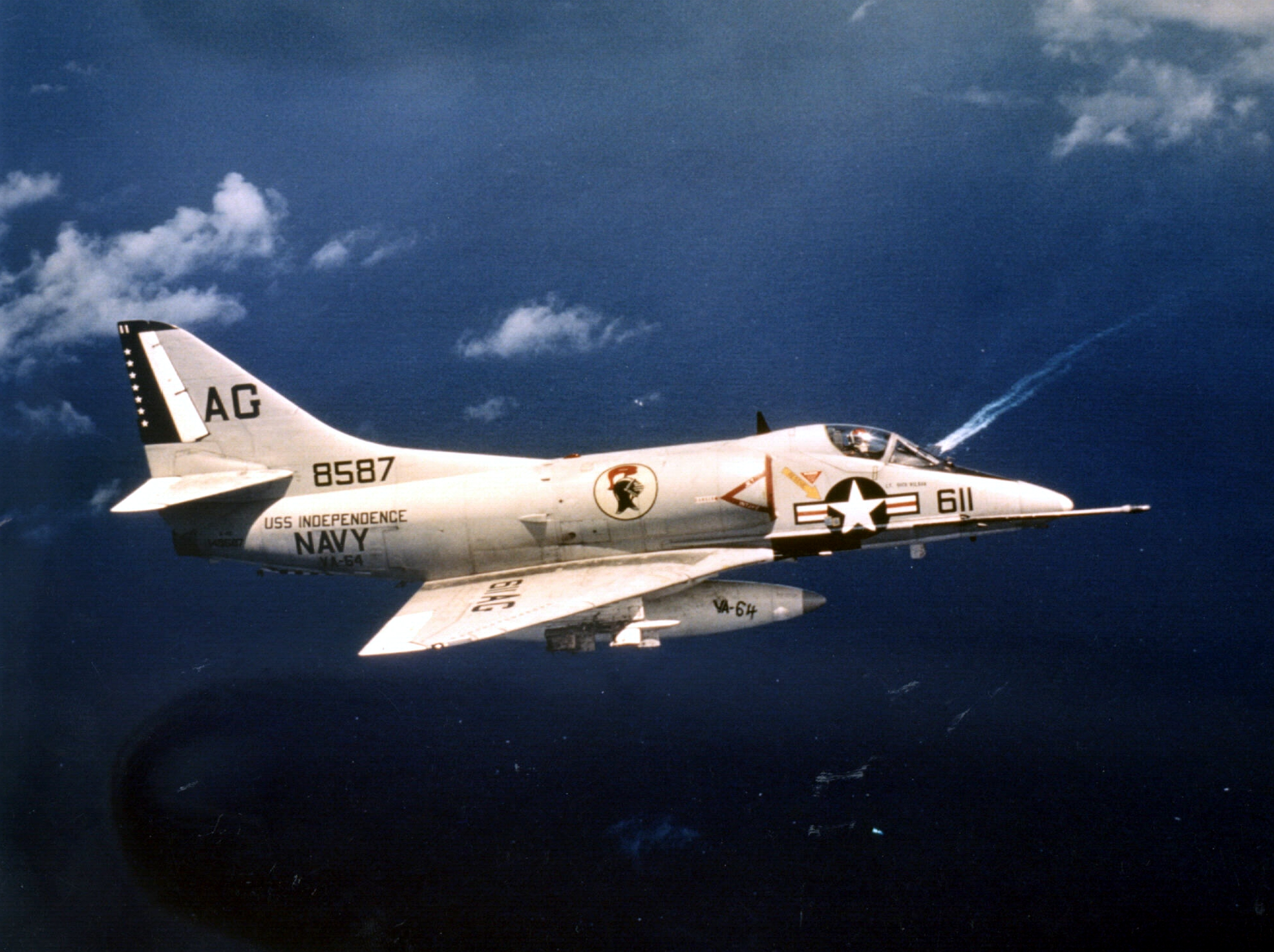
VA-64 A-4C in 1969

- 17 February–17 June 1962: VA-64 Detachment 48, formed to provide an air defense capability for Carrier Anti-Submarine Air Groups, deployed aboard USS Wasp for a North Atlantic cruise.
- October–18 November 1962: The squadron was embarked on USS Independence operating in the Caribbean Sea in support of the Cuban quarantine.
- 18 November–5 December 1962: VA-64 switched places with VA-34 and embarked on USS Enterprise. The complements of both squadrons were lifted between carriers by helicopters. Following the transfer the squadron continued to operate in the Caribbean as part of the Cuban quarantine.
- March 1964: The squadron conducted operations in the vicinity of Cyprus during a conflict between Turkish and Greek Cypriots.
- 31 July–3 October 1964: The squadron participated in Operation Sea Orbit, the first circumnavigation of the world by a nuclear task force. The sixty-five-day voyage was accomplished without logistic replenishment. The squadron participated in numerous air power demonstrations during the voyage.
- 8 June 1967: VA-64’s aircraft were part of an Air Wing 6 strike group that was launched to defend USS Liberty when she came under attack by the Israelis.
- November 1968: The squadron provided an A-4C, two pilots and seven enlisted personnel to augment the VSF-1 detachment aboard USS Wasp. The detachment provided the ship with a day time air defense capability.

== See also ==
- List of Douglas A-4 Skyhawk operators
- History of the United States Navy
- List of inactive United States Navy aircraft squadrons
- List of United States Navy aircraft squadrons
