= VC-7 =

Fleet Composite Squadron 7 (VC-7)
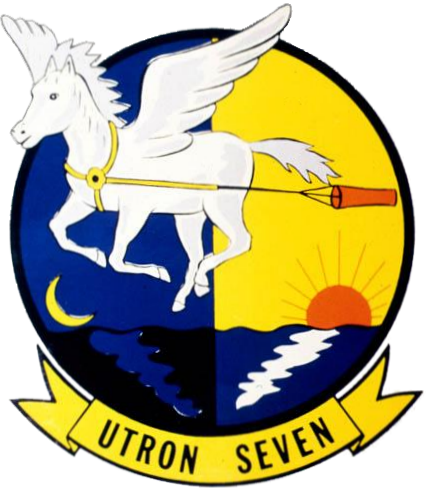
- VC-7 Squadron insignia
- Founded: 4 December 1942; 82 years ago
- Disbanded: 30 September 1980; 44 years ago
- Allegiance: United States
- Branch: United States Navy
- Nickname(s): Tallyhoers

VC-7 Tallyhoers was an aircraft squadron of the United States Navy. It was located at Naval Air Station Miramar from 1964 to 1980. Its primary function was to help train aviators in attacking and shooting down enemy aircraft. VC-7 was established as VJ-1 on 4 December 1942. In 1946 it was redesignated VU-7, and on 2 July 1965 to VC-7. The Squadron was disestablished on 30 September 1980.

VC-7 aircraft towed targets and engaged trainee pilots in aerial dogfights.

== Gallery ==
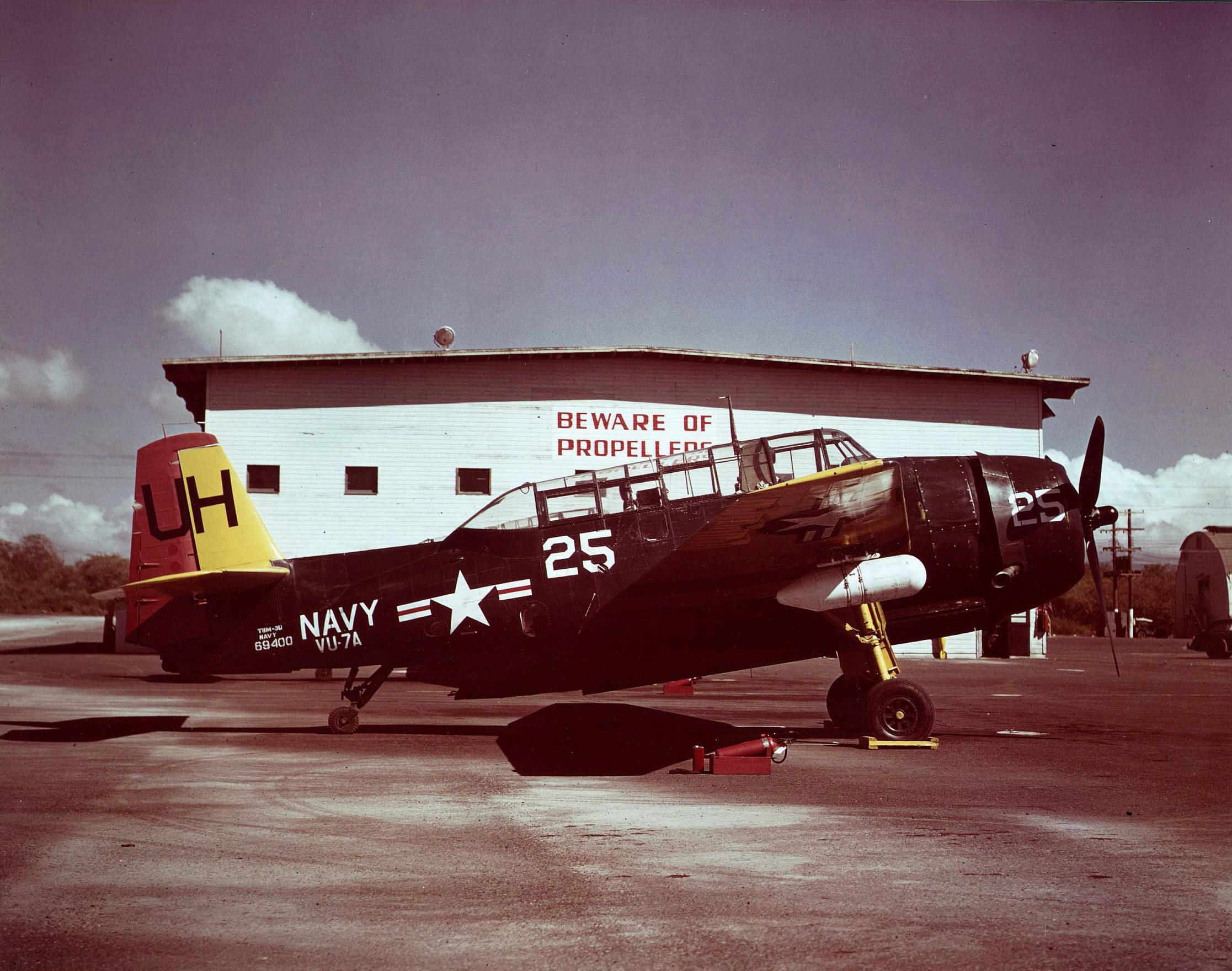
VU-7 TBM-3U at NAS Barbers Point, 1948

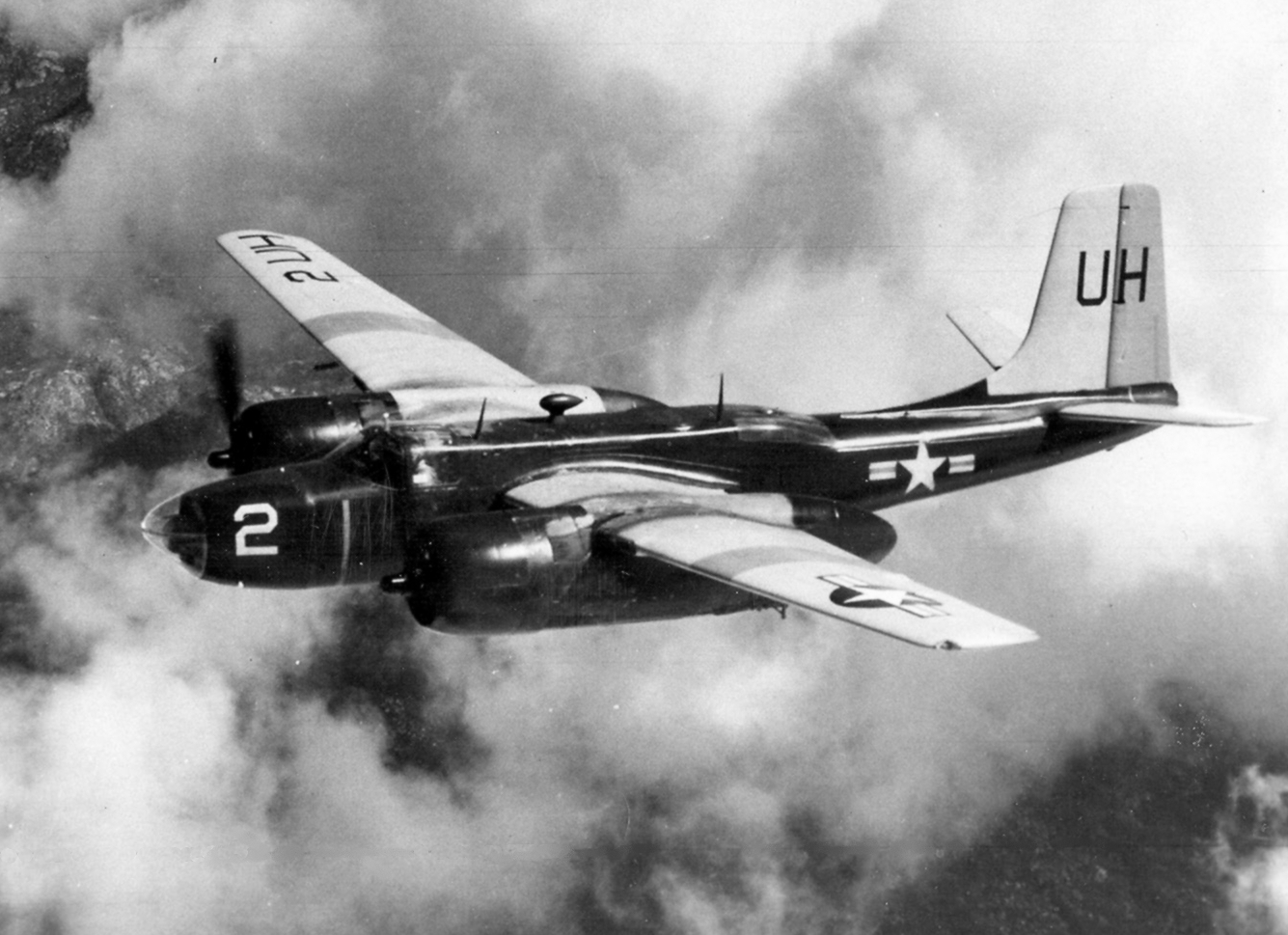
VU-7 JD-1 Invader in the 1950s

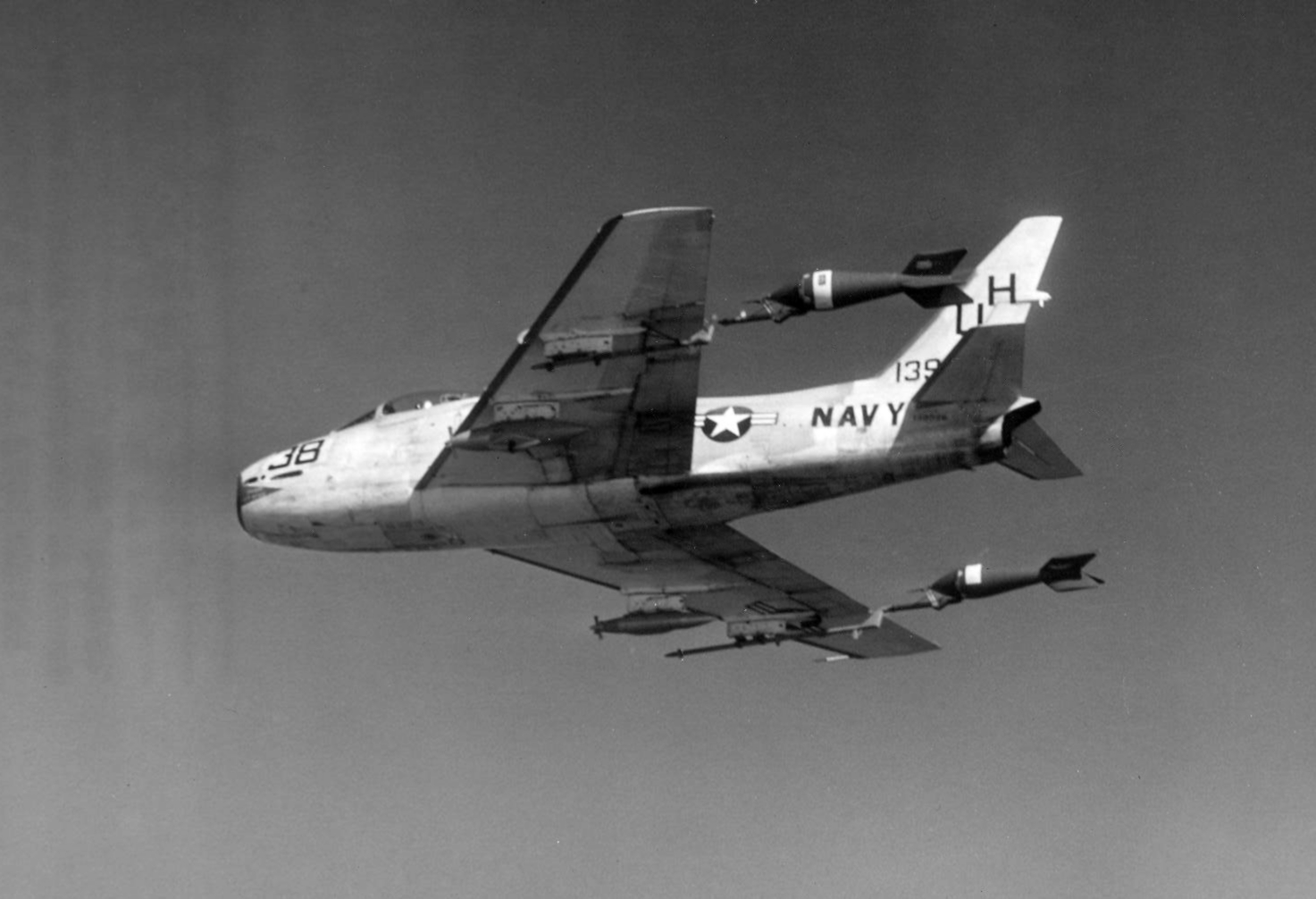
An FJ-4 with TDU-10/B "Dart" gunnery aerial tow target, 1960

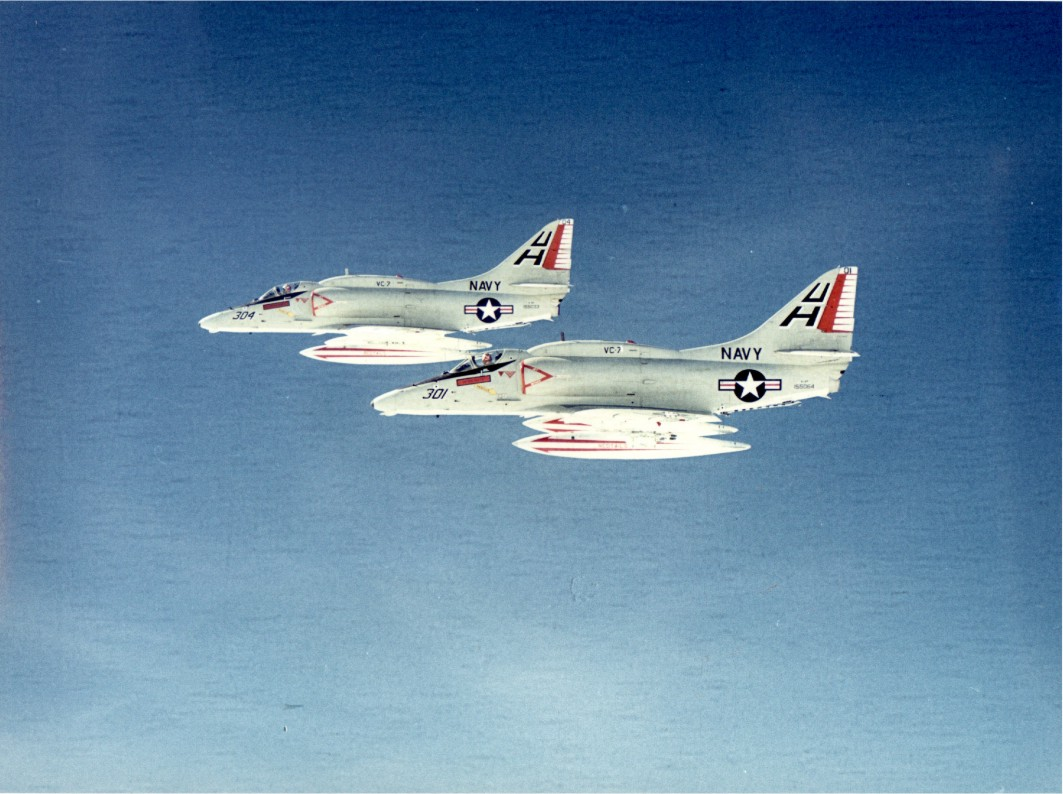
Douglas A-4F Skyhawks of VC-7, 1975 Taken by Lt. Pete Naff. Lt.Charlie "Tuna" Paine(Lead) and LTJG Gary "Easy" Staggs(Wingman)

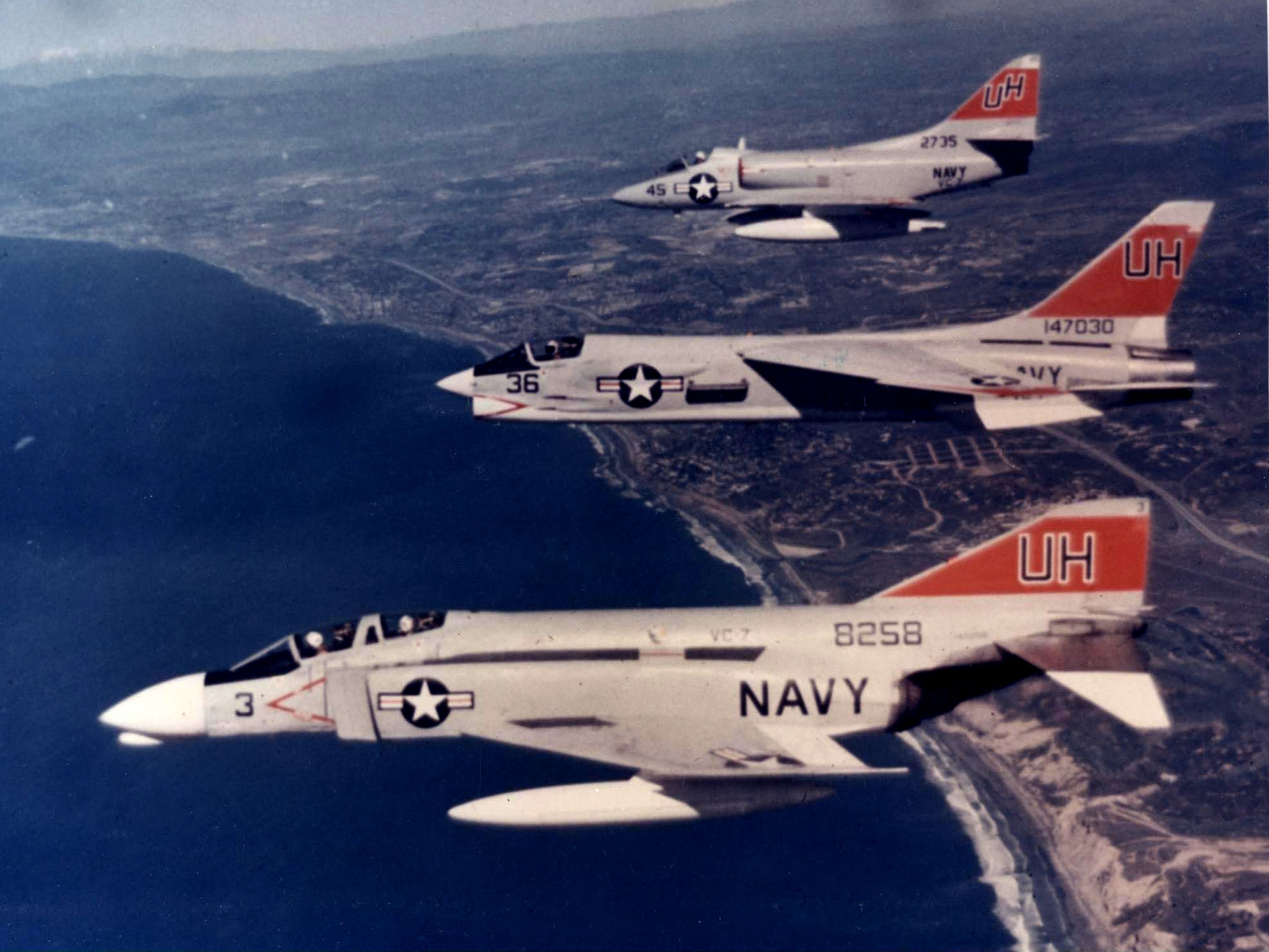
F-4A F-8C and A-4B of VC-7 in flight c1968
