= 131 Squadron (Israel) =

Israeli military unit

131st Squadron IAF
- טייסת 131
- Logo of the Squadron
- Active: 14 October 1973 – present
- Country: Israel
- Allegiance: Israel Defense Forces
- Branch: Israeli Air Force
- Type: Transport squadron
- Role: Transport and Evacuation
- Garrison/HQ: Nevatim Airbase
- Nickname(s): Knights of the Yellow Bird

Aircraft flown
- Transport: C-130E and KC-130H

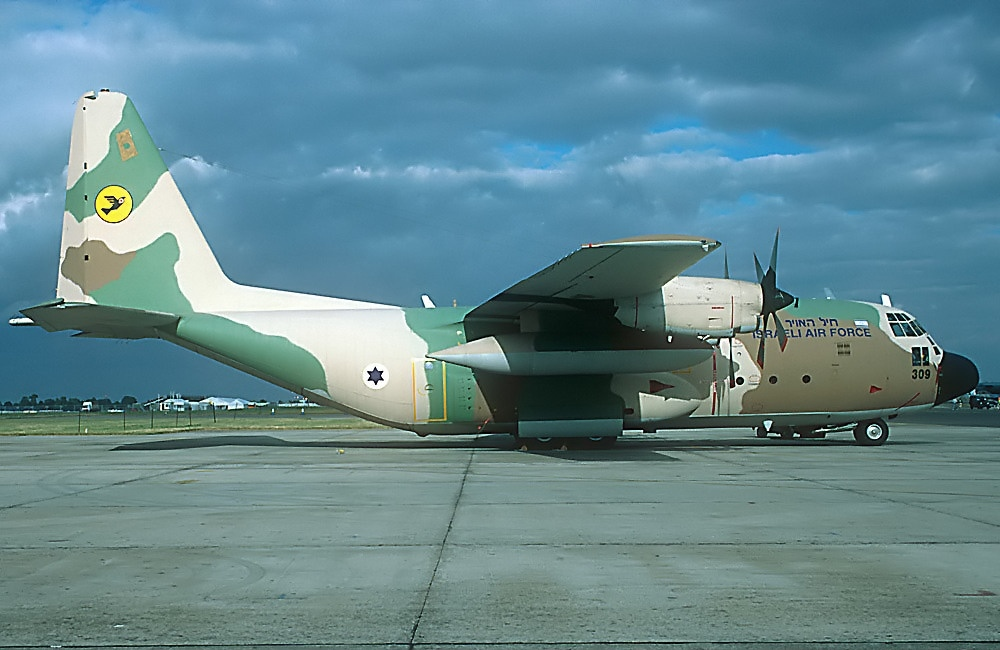
C-130E plane with Yellow Bird Squadron symbol on the tail

The 131 Squadron of the Israeli Air Force, also known as the Knights of the Yellow Bird, is a C-130E and KC-130H squadron based at Nevatim Airbase.

== History ==
The squadron was established during the Yom Kippur War, on 14 October 1973 at Lod Airbase, following the receipt of 12 C-130 Hercules ("Rhinoceros") aircraft, which were removed from the order of the forces of the American Air Force and handed over to the Israeli Air Force as military aid. The aforementioned 12 aircraft joined two "Rhinoceros" operated before the war by Squadron 120 ("the International Squadron") of the Air Force. The squadron's first commander was Lt. Col. David Porat. The rhinoceros immediately entered the fighting circle. In the first phase, they carried out an "aerial train" to transfer APCs to Sinai. The flight began on the night of 15 October and ended on the morning of 16 October. The teams performed 26 sorties in a short period of time, including the tasks of transporting personnel and equipment, and evacuating casualties .

On 25 November 1975, during a cooperation exercise with the infantry force, Rhino No. 203 hit the peak of Jebel Hilal in Sinai, loaded with an APC, 11 fighters and 9 crew members. All its passengers and crew perished.

In July 1976, four Hercules aircraft of the squadron participated in the Operation Entebbe . The aircraft structure was led by the squadron commander, Lt. Col. Yehoshua Shani.

From 1982, the squadron participated in secret operations to evacuate Ethiopian Jews from Sudan .

Due to an earthquake on 7 December 1988 in Armenia, the Israeli government decided to provide humanitarian aid to the earthquake victims. The two rhinoceros squadrons were launched to assist in the delivery of rescue and medical teams. On 16 April 1991, a Rhino took off with a joint team from Squadron 131 and Squadron 103 ("Elephant Squadron") to Diyarbakır, Turkey, with a shipment including medical equipment for the Kurdish refugees in the belly of the plane .

On 24-25 May 1991, the squadron participated in Operation Solomon to bring Ethiopian Jewry to Israel. During the operation, in which the IDF's heavy transport squadrons and the national airline " El Al " took part, approximately 14,500 immigrants were brought to Israel. In 9 sorties carried out by the squadron, 1,482 immigrants were brought. One of the squadron's Rhinos had to take off from the field in Addis Ababa with only three engines, due to an engine failure that occurred during the first takeoff attempt.

Another humanitarian operation that the squadron participated in was flying medical aid and food to refugees on the Rwanda - Zaire border, between July 24 and September 2, 1994, following the Rwandan genocide committed by the Hutu against the Tutsi in Rwanda . As part of the operation, the Rhino squadrons flew 16 sorties during which 160 tons of cargo were flown.

On 25 August 2008, the squadron moved to the Nevatim Airbase in the Negev.

On 18 July 2012, the squadron was launched to rescue the Israeli wounded after the attack in Burgas, Bulgaria .

In August 2013, the squadron received the flight crews and aircraft of the Elephant Squadron, after it was temporarily abolished.

In 2015, the IDF, in cooperation with the Israel Aerospace Industries, began upgrading the " Rhinoceros " aircraft to an improved model: " Rhinoceros Aviation ". The improvement includes a new cockpit, improved engines were installed, advanced command and control systems were added, and an elite helmet display was added, the systems with the special capabilities were upgraded and other systems were replaced, including the navigation system and the autopilot

During the April 2024 Iranian strikes against Israel, a C-130 Hercules of the squadron was damaged while parked in a hangar.

== Sources ==
- "Yellow Bird Squadron". Israeli Air Force.
