= VFA-305 =

Strike Fighter Squadron 305
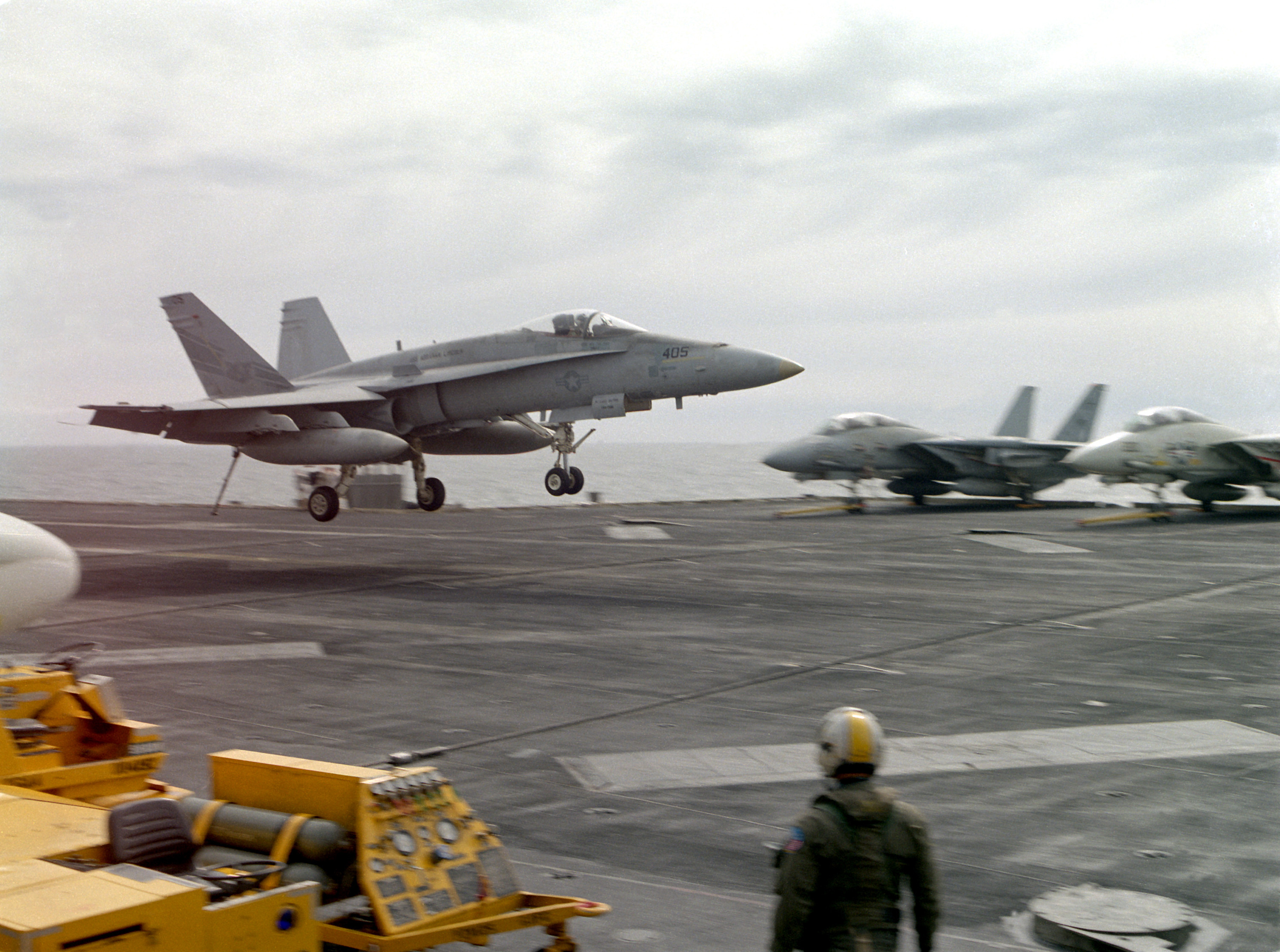
- VFA-305 F/A-18A lands on USS Abraham Lincoln in 1990
- Active: 1 July 1970 – 31 December 1994
- Country: United States
- Branch: United States Navy Reserve
- Type: Attack
- Part of: Inactive
- Nickname(s): Hackers; Lobos

Aircraft flown
- Attack: A-4C/E Skyhawk; A-7A/B Corsair; F/A-18A Hornet

VFA-305, nicknamed the Hackers from 1971 to 1974, and the Lobos from 1974 to 1994, was a Strike Fighter Squadron of the U.S. Navy Reserve. It was established as Attack Squadron VA-305 on 1 July 1970 at NAS Los Alamitos, California as part of a reorganization intended to increase the combat readiness of the Naval Air Reserve Force. It was relocated to NAS Point Mugu in January 1971. The squadron was redesignated VFA-305 on 1 January 1987, and disestablished on 31 December 1994.

== Operational history ==
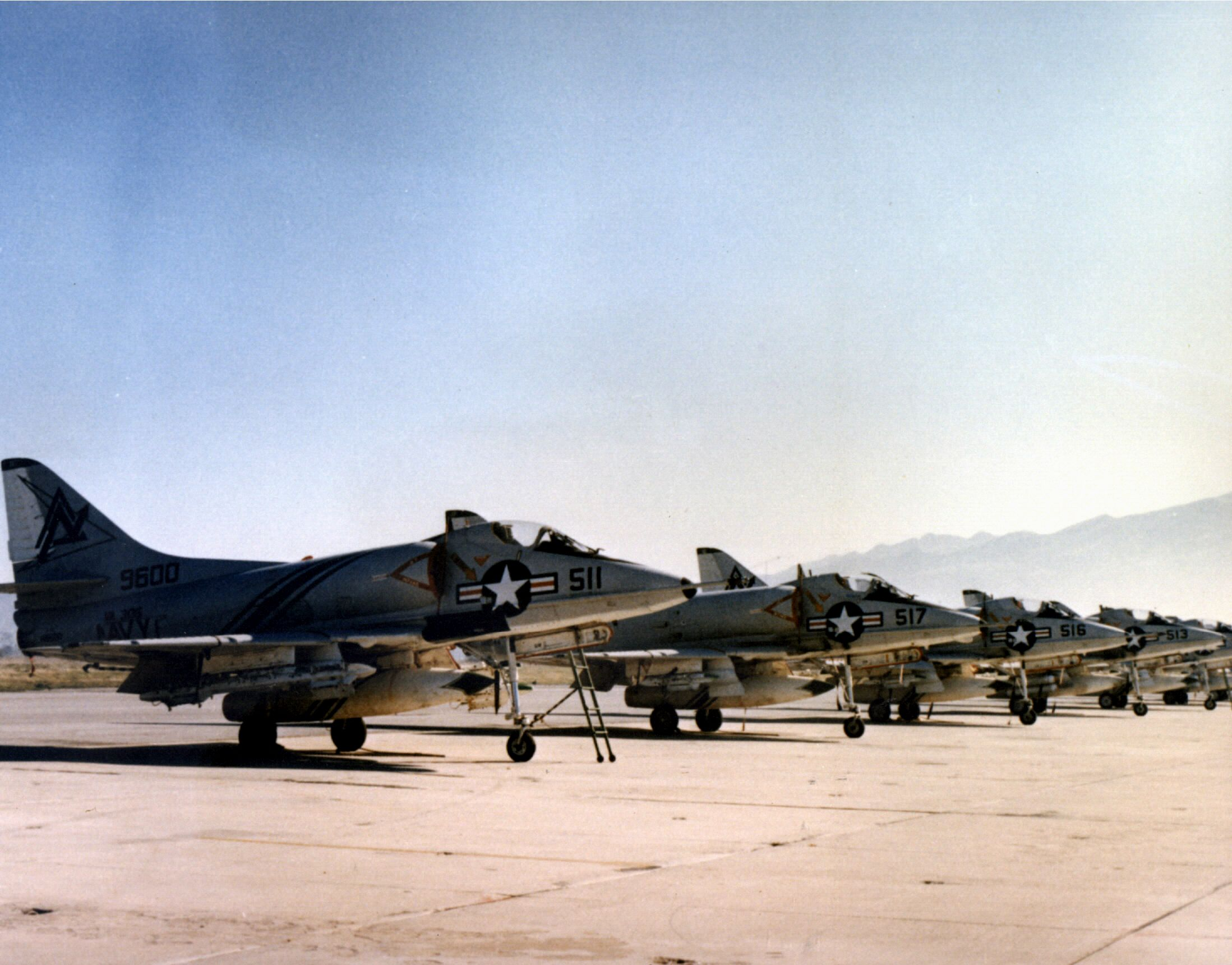
VA-305 A-4Cs at NAS Point Mugu c.1970

In November 1976, the squadron deployed aboard USS Ranger for annual active duty training and as part of CVWR-30's tactical air mobilization test and operational readiness exercise/inspection, to ensure that it was seaworthy and combat ready. This was part of a Reserve Air Test ordered by Congress.

From September–November 1990, the squadron's deployment with CVW-11 aboard USS Abraham Lincoln was the first total integration of a reserve squadron with an active duty air wing for a long deployment in support of direct fleet operational requirements. Squadron personnel participated in exercises and officer exchanges with the armed forces of Argentina and Chile. They also flew drug interdiction missions during the deployment. In 1993 the squadron added the roles of Adversary and Fleet Support to its primary mission.

== Aircraft assigned ==
The squadron operated the following aircraft, with the years first received as shown:

- A-4 Skyhawk: A-4C (1970) and A-4E (1971)
- A-7 Corsair: A-7A (1972) and A-7B (1978)
- F/A-18A Hornet (1987)

== See also ==
- History of the United States Navy
- List of inactive United States Navy aircraft squadrons
