= VF-131 =

Fighter Squadron 131
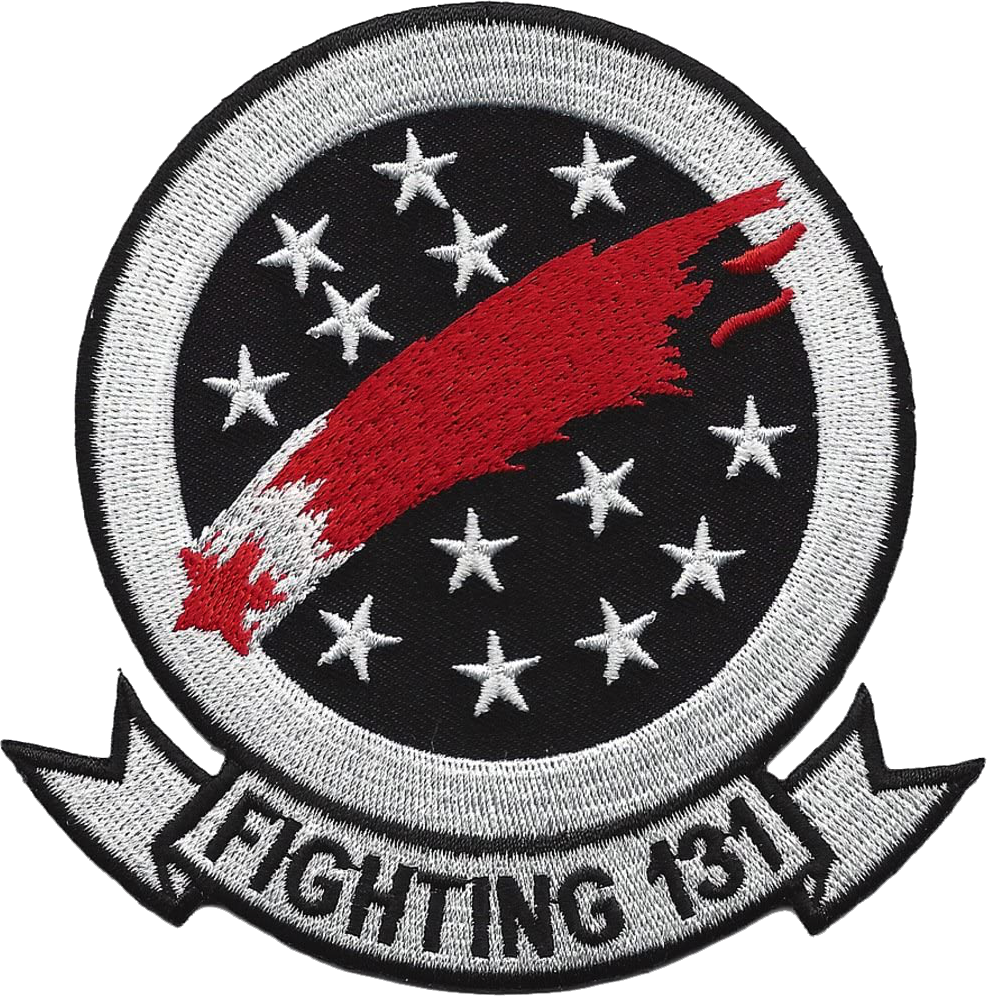
- Active: 21 August 1961 – 1 October 1962
- Country: United States
- Branch: United States Navy
- Type: Fighter
- Nickname(s): Nightcappers

Aircraft flown
- Fighter: F3H Demon

Fighter Squadron 131 or VF-131 was a short-lived U.S. Navy fighter squadron. It was established on 21 August 1961 and disestablished a year later, on 1 October 1962. It was based at NAS Cecil Field and flew F3H Demon fighters.

== Operational history ==
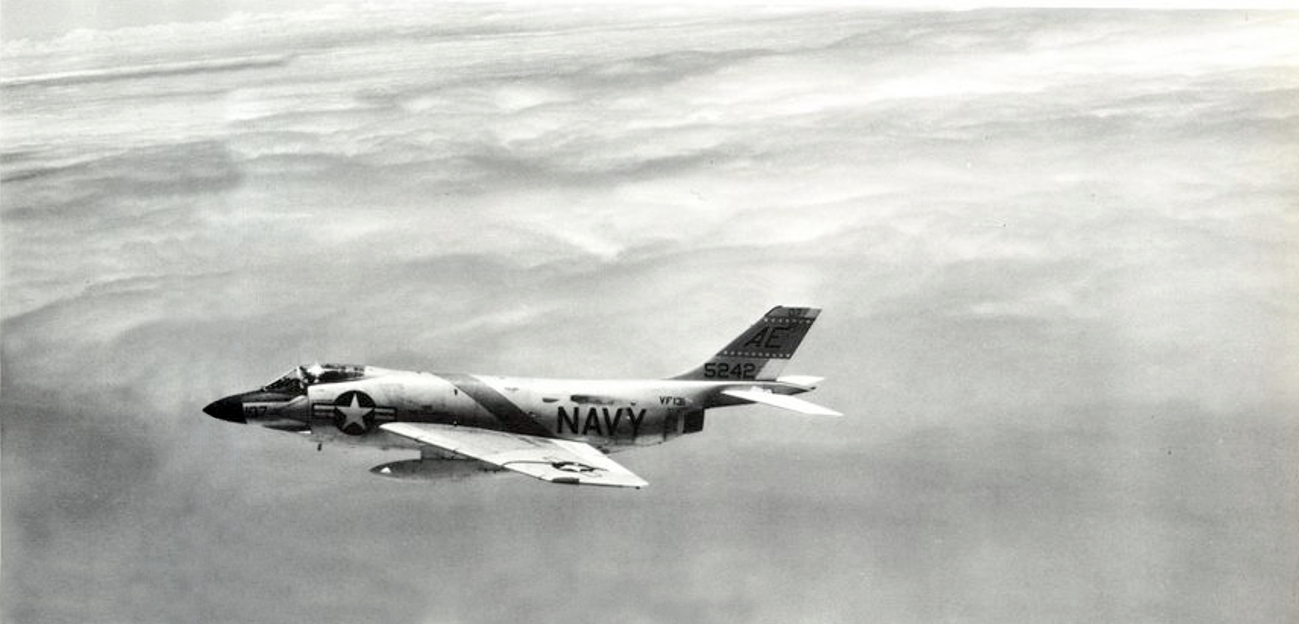
F3H-2 Demon of VF-131 in 1962

- August 1961: The squadron was established as part of a new Air Group to increase the strength of the fleet as a result of the Berlin Crisis of 1961.
- 8–19 February 1962: A squadron detachment was aboard USS Constellation for carrier trials and in a standby status for possible assistance during Project Mercury, the launching of Lieutenant Colonel John H. Glenn, USMC, in Mercury spacecraft Friendship 7.
- March–May 1962: The squadron participated in Constellation’s shakedown cruise in the Caribbean.

== See also ==
- List of inactive United States Navy aircraft squadrons
- History of the United States Navy
