= List of squadrons in the Dictionary of American Naval Aviation Squadrons =

The tables below cover every one of the 280 squadrons listed in the U.S. Navy's two-volume Dictionary of American Naval Aviation Squadrons (DANAS). (Note: Published in the public domain by the Naval Historical Center of the U.S. Department of the Navy's Naval History and Heritage Command, DANAS is the official and authoritative source of information about the squadrons it covers. Additional volumes are planned.) Volume 1 covers every squadron in the Attack (VA) and Strike Fighter (VFA) communities from 1935 to 1995. Volume 2 covers every squadron in the Patrol (VP) community from 1922 through 1996.

You can see any squadron's DANAS article by following the link to the cited reference and scrolling down to the appropriate page. You can see its Wikipedia article by clicking the Wikilink in the table; if there is no Wikilink, there is no known article for the squadron.

== VA squadrons ==
This table shows the 88 VA Attack Squadrons listed in Volume 1 of DANAS. A detailed lineage list for all squadrons mentioned in Volume 1 is available HERE.

Squadron ID in DANAS	Wikipedia; Article	Years in Service (Note: If a squadron is still active, a link to its public domain website is provided in this column. Otherwise, the column entry shows the year in which the squadron was first established and the year in which it was finally disestablished. Squadrons typically had more than one designation during that time. They are listed according to their designation when disestablished.)	(Note: The hyperlink in the reference will take you to the section of DANAS that includes this squadron and several others. (DANAS is in the public domain, so there are no copyright considerations in linking directly to it here.) Scroll down to find the one you want. In addition to the material in the Wikipedia article, DANAS articles include extensive material on the squadron's insignia and nickname; detailed lists of Commanding Officers, major overseas deployments, wing assignments and unit awards received; and photos of the squadron's men and aircraft.)
VA-1E	VA-1E (U.S. Navy)	1945–1948	
VA-1L	VA-1L (U.S. Navy)	1946–1948	
VA-12	VA-12 (U.S. Navy)	1945–1986	
VA-15	VA-15 (U.S. Navy)	1942–1969	
VA-16	VA-16 (U.S. Navy)	1955–1958	
VA-21A	VA-21A (U.S. Navy)	1944–1947	
VA-22A	VA-22A (U.S. Navy)	1944–1947	
VA-23	VA-23 (U.S. Navy)	1949–1970	
Second VA-34	Second VA-34 (U.S. Navy)	1943–1969	
Third VA-34	Third VA-34 (U.S. Navy)	Redesignated; VFA-34	
VA-35	VA-35 (U.S. Navy)	1925–1949	
Second VA-35	Second VA-35 (U.S. Navy)	1934–1995	
VA-36	VA-36 (U.S. Navy)	1952–1970	
Second VA-36	Second VA-36 (U.S. Navy)	1987–1994	
VA-38	VA-38 (U.S. Navy)	1967–1968	
VA-42	VA-42 (U.S. Navy)	1950–1994	
VA-44	VA-44 (U.S. Navy)	1945–1950	
Second VA-44	Second VA-44 (U.S. Navy)	1950–1970	
VA-45	VA-45 (U.S. Navy)	1945–1950	
Second VA-45	Second VA-45 (U.S. Navy)	1950–1958	
VA-46	VA-46 (U.S. Navy)	1955–1991	
VA-52	VA-52 (U.S. Navy)	1949–1995	
VA-54	VA-54 (U.S. Navy)	1928–1949	
Second VA-54	Second VA-54 (U.S. Navy)	1945–1958	
VA-55	VA-55 (U.S. Navy)	1943–1975	
Second VA-55	Second VA-55 (U.S. Navy)	1983–1991	
VA-56	VA-56 (U.S. Navy)	1956–1986	
Second VA-64	Second VA-64 (U.S. Navy)	1961–1969	
Second VA-65	Second VA-65 (U.S. Navy)	1945–1993	
Second VA-66	Second VA-66 (U.S. Navy)	1951–1986	
VA-72	VA-72 (U.S. Navy)	1945–1991	
VA-75	VA-75 (U.S. Navy)	1943–1949	
Second VA-75	Second VA-75 (U.S. Navy)	1943–1950	
VA-76	VA-76 (U.S. Navy)	1955–1969	
VA-84	VA-84 (U.S. Navy)	1948–1949	
VA-85	VA-85 (U.S. Navy)	1948–1949	
Second VA-85	Second VA-85 (U.S. Navy)	1951–1994	
VA-93	VA-93 (U.S. Navy)	1952–1986	
VA-94	VA-94 (U.S. Navy)	1943–1949	
VA-95	VA-95 (U.S. Navy)	1943–1949	
Second VA-95	Second VA-95 (U.S. Navy)	1952–1970	
Third VA-95	Third VA-95 (U.S. Navy)	1972–1995	
VA-96	VA-96 (U.S. Navy)	1956–1958	
VA-104	VA-104 (U.S. Navy)	1952–1959	
VA-105	VA-105 (U.S. Navy); Redirect to VFA-105	1952–1959	
Second VA-106	Pending	1945–1969	

Squadron ID in DANAS	Wikipedia; Article	Years in Service
VA-112	VA-112 (U.S. Navy)	1945–1969
VA-114	VA-114 (U.S. Navy)	1942–1949
VA-115	VA-115 (U.S. Navy)	Redesignated; VFA-115
VA-122	VA-122 (U.S. Navy)	1950–1991
VA-125	VA-125 (U.S. Navy)	1946–1958
Second VA-125	Second VA-125 (U.S. Navy)	1956–1977
VA-128	VA-128 (U.S. Navy)	1967–1995
VA-133	VA-133 (U.S. Navy)	1961–1962
Second VA-134	Second VA-134 (U.S. Navy)	1961–1962
VA-135	VA-135 (U.S. Navy)	1944–1949
Second VA-135	Second VA-135 (U.S. Navy)	1961–1962
VA-144	VA-144 (U.S. Navy)	1955–1971
VA-145	VA-145 (U.S. Navy)	1949–1993
VA-152	VA-152 (U.S. Navy)	1951–1971
VA-153	VA-153 (U.S. Navy)	1949–1977
VA-154	VA-154 (U.S. Navy)	1945–1949
VA-155	VA-155 (U.S. Navy)	1945–1949
Second VA-155	Second VA-155 (U.S. Navy)	1946–1977
Third VA-155	Third VA-155 (U.S. Navy)	1987–1993
VA-163	VA-163 (U.S. Navy)	1960-0971
VA-164	VA-164 (U.S. Navy)	1960-0975
VA-165	VA-165 (U.S. Navy)	1960–1996
VA-172	VA-172 (U.S. Navy)	1945–1971
VA-174	VA-174 (U.S. Navy)	1944–1950
Second VA-174	Second VA-174 (U.S. Navy)	1944–1988
VA-175	VA-175 (U.S. Navy)	1944–1958
VA-176	VA-176 (U.S. Navy)	1955–1992
VA-185	VA-185 (U.S. Navy)	1986–1991
VA-194	VA-194 (U.S. Navy)	1943–1949
VA-196	VA-196 (U.S. Navy)	1948–1955
VA-205	VA-205 (U.S. Navy)	1970–1994
VA-209	VA-209 (U.S. Navy)	1970–1971
VA-210	VA-210 (U.S. Navy)	1970–1971
VA-212	VA-212 (U.S. Navy)	1955–1975
VA-213	VA-213 (U.S. Navy)	1948–1949
VA-214	VA-214 (U.S. Navy)	1948–1949
Second VA-214	Second VA-214 (U.S. Navy)	1955–1958
VA-215	VA-215 (U.S. Navy)	1955–1967
Second VA-215	Second VA-215 (U.S. Navy)	1968–1977
VA-216	VA-216 (U.S. Navy)	1955–1970
VA-304	VA-304 (U.S. Navy)	1970–1994
VA-776	VA-776 (U.S. Navy)	1968
VA-831	VA-831 (U.S. Navy)	1968
VA-873	VA-873 (U.S. Navy)	1968

88 squadrons

== VAH, VAK, VAL & VAP squadrons ==
This table shows the 5 VAH Heavy Attack, 2 VAK Tactical Aerial Refueling, 1 VAL Light Attack, and 2 VAP Heavy Photographic squadrons listed in Volume 1 of DANAS. A detailed lineage list for all squadrons mentioned in Volume 1 is available HERE.

Squadron ID in DANAS	Wikipedia; Article	Years in Service
VAH-8	VAH-8	1957–1968
VAH-15	VAH-15	1958–1959
VAH-16	VAH-16	1958–1959
VAH-21	VAH-21	1968–1969
VAH-123	VAH-123	1957–1971
VAK-208	VAK-208	1970–1989
VAK-308	VAK-308	1970–1988
VAL-4	VAL-4	1969–1972
VAP-61	VAP-61	1951–1971
VAP-62	VAP-62	1952–1969

10 squadrons

== VFA squadrons ==
This table shows the 31 VFA Strike Fighter squadrons listed in Volume 1 of DANAS. A detailed lineage list for all squadrons mentioned in Volume 1 is available HERE.

Squadron ID in DANAS	Wikipedia; Article	Years in Service
VFA-15	VFA-15	Active
VFA-22	VFA-22	Active
VFA-25	VFA-25	Active
VFA-27	VFA-27	Active
VFA-37	VFA-37	Active
VFA-81	VFA-81	Active
VFA-82	VFA-82	1967–2005
VFA-83	VFA-83	Active
VFA-86	VFA-86	Active
VFA-87	VFA-87	Active
VFA-94	VFA-94	Active
VFA-97	VFA-97	Active
VFA-105	VFA-105	Active
VFA-106	VFA-106	Active
VFA-113	VFA-113	Active
VFA-125	VFA-125	1980–2010

Squadron ID in DANAS	Wikipedia; Article	Years in Service
VFA-127	VFA-127	1962–1996
VFA-131	VFA-131	Active
VFA-132	VFA-132	1984–1992
VFA-136	VFA-136	Active
VFA-137	VFA-137	Active
VFA-146	VFA-146	Active
VFA-147	VFA-147	Active
VFA-151	VFA-151	Active
VFA-161	VFA-161	1960–1987
VFA-192	VFA-192	Active
VFA-195	VFA-195	Active
VFA-203	VFA-203	1970–2004
VFA-204	VFA-204	Active
VFA-303	VFA-303	1970–1994
VFA-305	VFA-305	1970–1994

31 squadrons

== VP squadrons ==
This table shows the 78 VP Patrol Squadrons listed in Volume 2 of DANAS. An Index of Squadron Histories and Aircraft Data for all squadrons in Volume 2 is available HERE. A detailed lineage list for all squadrons mentioned in Volume 2 is available HERE.

Squadron ID in DANAS	Wikipedia; Article	Years in Service
First VP-1	VP-1 (1921-2)	1921–1922
Second VP-1	VP-1 (1924-6)	1924–1926
Fifth VP-1	VP-1	Active
Second VP-2	VP-2	1943–1969
Second VP-3	VP-3	1937–1955
Second VP-4	VP-4	Active
Second VP-5	VP-5	Active
First VP-6	VP-6 (1924-6)	1924–1926
Third VP-6	VP-6	1943–1993
Second VP-7	VP-7	1944–1969
Second VP-8	VP-8	Active
Second VP-9	VP-9	Active
Third VP-10	VP-10	Active
Fourth VP-11	VP-11	1941–1997
Third VP-16	VP-16	Active
Third VP-17	VP-17	1946–1995
Third VP-18	VP-18	1946–1968
Third VP-19	VP-19	1946–1991
Third VP-20	VP-20	1929–1949
Third VP-21	VP-21	1929–1942
Fifth VP-21	VP-21 (1943-69)	1943–1969
First VP-22	Pending	1928–1942
Third VP-22	VP-22	1943–1994
Third VP-23	VP-23	1930–1995
Third VP-24	VP-24	1943–1995
Second VP-25	VP-25	1944–1946
Third VP-25	VP-25 (1943-50)	1943–1950
Second VP-26	VP-26 (1944-6)	1944–1946
Third VP-26	VP-26	Active
Second VP-27	VP-27	1941–1950
Second VP-28	VP-28	1943–1969
First VP-29	VP-29	1935–1950
Second VP-29	VP-29 (1946-55)	1946–1955
VP-30	VP-30	Active
Second VP-31	VP-31	1960–1993
Third VP-32	VP-32	1943–1949
Third VP-33	VP-33	1935–1949
Second VP-34	VP-34	1936–1956
First VP-40	VP-40	1940–1950
Second VP-40	VP-40 (1951-present)	Active

Squadron ID in DANAS	Wikipedia; Article	Years in Service
Second VP-41	VP-41	1944–1949
Second VP-42	VP-42	1944–1969
Third VP-43	VP-43	1944–1949
Third VP-44	VP-44	1942–1950
Fourth VP-44	VP-44 (1951-91)	1951–1991
Third VP-45	Pending	Active
VP-46	VP-46	Active
VP-47	VP-47	Active
First VP-48	VP-48	1942–1949
Second VP-48	VP-48 (1946-91)	1946–1991
VP-49	VP-49	1944–1994
VP-50	VP-50	1946–1992
Third VP-51	VP-51	1948–1950
Second VP-56	VP-56	1946–1991
VP-60	VP-60	1970–1994
Third VP-61	VP-61	1944–1950
First VP-62	VP-62	1942–1943
Third VP-62	VP-62 (1942-50)	1942–1950
Fourth VP-62	VP-62 (1970-present)	Active
VP-64	VP-64	1970-2004 (Note: VP-64 was redesignated as Fleet Logistic Support Squadron VR-64 in 2004. VR-64 is still an active squadron, and its public domain website is HERE.)
VP-65	VP-65	1970–2006
VP-66	VP-66	1970–2006
VP-67	VP-67	1970–1994
VP-68	VP-68	1970–1997
VP-90	VP-90	1970–1994
Second VP-91	VP-91	1970–1999
Second VP-92	VP-92	1970–2007
Second VP-93	VP-93	1976–1994
Second VP-94	VP-94	1970–2006
First VP-102	VP-102	1937–1942
VP-106	VP-106	1943–1946
VP-123	VP-123	1943–1946
VP-131	VP-131	1943–1946
VP-133	VP-133	1943–1946
VP-142	VP-142	1943–1946
VP-148	VP-148	1943–1946
VP-152	VP-152	1944–1946
VP-153	VP-153	1944–1946

78 squadrons

== VPB, VP(HL) & VP(AM) squadrons ==
This table shows the 68 VPB Patrol Bombing, 3 VP(HL) Heavy Patrol, and 2 VP(AM) Amphibian Patrol squadrons listed in Volume 2 of DANAS. An Index of Squadron Histories and Aircraft Data for all squadrons in Volume 2 is available HERE. A detailed lineage list for all squadrons mentioned in Volume 2 is available HERE.

Squadron ID in DANAS	Wikipedia; Article	Years in Service
VPB-1	VPB-1	1943–1945
VPB-4	VPB-4	1943–1945
VPB-6 (CG)	VPB-6	1943–1945
VPB-11	VPB-11	1924–1945
VPB-13	VPB-13	1940–1945
VPB-15	VPB-15	1943–1945
VPB-16	VPB-16	1943–1945
VPB-17	VPB-17	1944–1946
VPB-18	VPB-18	1944–1945
VPB-20	VPB-20	1944–1946
VPB-23	VPB-23	1930–1946
VPB-24	VPB-24	1930–1945
VPB-29	VPB-29	1923–1940
VPB-33	VPB-33	1942–1945
VPB-34	VPB-34	1942–1945
VPB-43	VPB-43	1941–1945
VPB-44	VPB-44	1941–1945
VPB-45	VPB-45	1943–1945
VPB-52	VPB-52	1928–1945
VPB-54	VPB-54	1942–1945
VPB-61	VPB-61	1942–1945
VPB-63	VPB-63	1942–1945
VPB-84	VPB-84	1941–1945
VPB-91	VPB-91	1941–1946
VPB-92	VPB-92	1941–1945
VPB-94	VPB-94	1942–1944
VPB-98	VPB-98	1944–1946
VPB-99	VPB-99	1945–1946
VPB-100	VPB-100	1944–1945
VPB-103	VPB-103	1943–1945
VPB-105	VPB-105	1924–1945
VPB-109	VPB-109	1943–1945
VPB-110	VPB-110	1943–1945
VPB-112	VPB-112	1943–1945
VPB-113	VPB-113	1943–1945
VPB-117	VPB-117	1944–1945
VPB-118	VPB-118	1944–1945

Squadron ID in DANAS	Wikipedia; Article	Years in Service
VPB-121	VPB-121	1937–1946
VPB-125	VPB-125	1938–1945
VPB-126	VPB-126	1942–1945
VPB-127	VPB-127	1943–1945
VPB-129	VPB-129	1943–1945
VPB-132	VPB-132	1943–1945
VPB-134	VPB-134	1943–1945
VPB-137	VPB-137	1943–1945
VPB-139	VPB-139	1943–1945
VPB-141	VPB-141	1943–1945
VPB-145	VPB-145	1943–1945
VPB-147	VPB-147	1943–1945
VPB-149	VPB-149	1943–1945
VPB-150	VPB-150	1943–1945
VPB-151	VPB-151	1944–1945
VPB-197	VPB-197	1938–1946
VPB-198	VPB-198	1944–1946
VPB-199	VPB-199	1944–1945
VPB-200	VPB-200	1944–1945
VPB-202	VPB-202	1942–1945
VPB-203	VPB-203	1942–1945
VPB-206	VPB-206	1942–1945
VPB-207	VPB-207	1942–1945
VPB-209	VPB-209	1943–1945
VPB-210	VPB-210	1943–1945
VPB-211	VPB-211	1943–1945
VPB-212	VPB-212	1943–1946
VPB-213	VPB-213	1943–1945
VPB-214	VPB-214	1943–1945
VPB-215	VPB-215	1943–1945
VPB-216	VPB-216	1943–1945
VP-HL-1	VP-HL-1	1943–1947
VP-HL-3	VP-HL-3	1943–1947
VP-HL-5	VP-HL-5	1943–1947
VP-AM-1	VP-AM-1	1942–1948
VP-AM-5	VP-AM-5	1946–1947

73 squadrons

== See also ==
- Squadron (aviation)
- Attack aircraft
- Strike fighter
- Maritime patrol aircraft
- List of United States Navy aircraft squadrons
- List of inactive United States Navy aircraft squadrons
- Naval aviation
- Modern US Navy carrier air operations
- List of United States Navy aircraft designations (pre-1962)
- United States Naval Aviator
- Naval Flight Officer
- United States Marine Corps Aviation
- NATOPS
