= VP-1 (1924–1926) =

Patrol Squadron 1
- Active: 29 May 1924 – 3 May 1926
- Country: United States of America
- Branch: United States Navy
- Type: squadron
- Role: Maritime patrol

Aircraft flown
- Patrol: F5L

VP-1 was a Patrol Squadron of the U.S. Navy. The squadron was established as Patrol Squadron 1 (VP-1) on 29 May 1924 and was removed from the Naval Aeronautic Organization on 3 May 1926. It was the second squadron to be designated VP-1, the first VP-1 was disestablished in July 1922.

== Operational history ==
- 29 May 1924: VP-1 was established under the operational control of Naval Coast Defense Forces, San Diego Region. The squadron was designated as a patrol squadron flying two F-5L seaplanes. VP-1 was given the patrol squadron designation by Chief of Naval Operations in the "Naval Aeronautic Organization for Fiscal Year 1925" letter (serial no. 111-78:1). The new designation placed it under the Naval Coast Defense Forces, San Diego Region, to ". . . endeavor to improve cooperation between aircraft, destroyers and submarines based at San Diego."
- 1 May 1925: VP-1 participated in exercises against the fleet at Oahu.
- 29 May 1925: Operational control over the squadron shifted during the reorganization of patrol squadrons, placing VP-1 under Aircraft Squadrons, Convoy and Patrol, Pacific. Although no documentation can be found that clarifies the status of the squadron during this period, evidence suggests that VP-1 remained at NAS Pearl Harbor after the exercises in early May 1925. Its assets and personnel may have been incorporated into VP-14 during this time period, because the aging F-5L seaplanes flown by both squadrons were being taken out of service and replaced by new SC seaplanes. Budget restrictions and limited production deliveries of new aircraft may have prompted this merger.
- 3 May 1926: VP-1 does not appear on "Naval Aeronautic Organization for Fiscal Year 1927." The squadron was supplanted by the naval base training command squadron VN-1. There is no official date for the squadron’s disestablishment.

== Aircraft assignments ==
The squadron was assigned the following aircraft, effective on the dates shown:

- Felixstowe F5L flying boat - May 1924

== Home port assignments ==
The squadron was assigned to these home ports, effective on the dates shown:

- NAS San Diego, California - 29 May 1924
- NAS Pearl Harbor, Hawaii - 1 July 1925

== See also ==
- Maritime patrol aircraft
- List of inactive United States Navy aircraft squadrons
- List of United States Navy aircraft squadrons
- List of squadrons in the Dictionary of American Naval Aviation Squadrons
- History of the United States Navy
