= VPB-100 =

Patrol Bombing Squadron 100
- Active: 1 April 1944 – 15 December 1945
- Country: United States of America
- Branch: United States Navy
- Type: squadron
- Role: Maritime patrol
- Engagements: World War II

Aircraft flown
- Patrol: PBY-5A; PBM-3D/5; PB2Y-2/3; PB4Y-1; PB4Y-2; PV-1; PV-2

VPB-100 was a Patrol Bombing Squadron of the U.S. Navy. The squadron was established as Patrol Squadron 100 (VP-100) on 1 April 1944, redesignated Patrol Bombing Squadron 100 (VPB-100) on 1 October 1944 and disestablished on 15 December 1945.

== Operational history ==
- 1 April 1944: VP-100 was established at NAS Kaneohe Bay, Hawaii, as a seaplane squadron flying the PBY-5 and PBY-5A Catalina. Personnel (seven officers and 15 enlisted) and equipment were drawn from the HEDRON Replacement Unit, FAW-2. The mission of the squadron was to train replacement crews, ferry aircraft to advance bases, and maintain two aircraft and one crew for around-the-clock standby and rescue work at NAS Kaneohe Bay. Detachments of two crews and two aircraft each were also maintained at Johnston Atoll and Kanton Island for rescue and Anti-submarine warfare (ASW) patrol duties.
- 15 July 1944: Lieutenant Cecil A. Roark and his PBY crew landed in heavy seas to rescue two survivors of an SB2C crash. The PBY was damaged on landing and sank after six hours but the crew was able to rescue survivors of the SB2C with their life rafts. All awaited rescue by USS Crouter, which arrived a short time later.
- July – September 1944: Training and operational flights were conducted for 17 PBY crews and four PBM crews during this period. Personnel undergoing training were replacement and rotational crews fresh from the US going into the combat zone with squadrons in the middle of their tours. Through the end of the war, the squadron continued this training function, as well as transporting the crews to their new squadrons and ferrying aircraft to squadrons in need of replacements due to combat losses, accidents, or overdue for maintenance. PBY Catalina, PBM Mariner and PB2Y Coronado seaplanes were assigned the squadron for training purposes. In August 1944, Commander Air Force, Pacific Fleet advised that the rotation of squadrons in the forward area would be discontinued in the near future and that only the personnel in the squadrons would be rotated. Crews being trained at NAS Kaneohe Bay would be sent to replacement pools in the forward areas for reassignment to squadrons as needed. As a result of these added responsibilities, the squadron’s complement of personnel was doubled.
- 1 February 1945: Lieutenant Robert Erickson and his crew of 10 were killed in a crash at sea in a PBY-5A due to unknown causes during a night navigation training flight.
- 22 March 1945: Lieutenant Walter L. Hanson and his crew of 10 were killed in a crash at sea in a PBM-5. The aircraft was observed flying with one engine feathered immediately prior to the crash.
- 10 May 1945: Lieutenant (jg) Roland M. Cocker ditched at sea in a PBM-5 at night after a fire began inside the wing between the engine and fuselage. Nine crew members were killed in the crash. Three survivors were rescued the next day by the squadron commanding officer, Lieutenant Ewing E. Albertson.
- 24 October 1945: Personnel and assets of VPB-200 were consolidated with VPB-100. With this merger, the squadron was capable of training replacement crews in the PB4Y-1 Liberator, PB4Y-2 Privateer, PV-1 Ventura and PV-2 Harpoon. It also streamlined the rotation program and eliminated the personnel problem in the squadron created by demobilization.
- 15 December 1945: VPB-100 was disestablished at NAS Kaneohe Bay.

== Aircraft assignments ==
The squadron was assigned the following aircraft, effective on the dates shown:

- PBY-5/5A - April 1944
- PBM-3D - July 1944
- PB2Y-2/3 - July 1944
- PB2B-2 - January 1945
- PBM-5 - January 1945
- PB4Y-1 - October 1945
- PB4Y-2 - October 1945
- PV-1 - October 1945
- PV-2 - October 1945

== Home port assignments ==
The squadron was assigned to these home ports, effective on the dates shown:

- NAS Kaneohe Bay, Hawaii - 1 April 1944

== See also ==
- Maritime patrol aircraft
- List of inactive United States Navy aircraft squadrons
- List of United States Navy aircraft squadrons
- List of squadrons in the Dictionary of American Naval Aviation Squadrons
- History of the United States Navy
