= VP-26 (1944–1946) =

Patrol Squadron 26
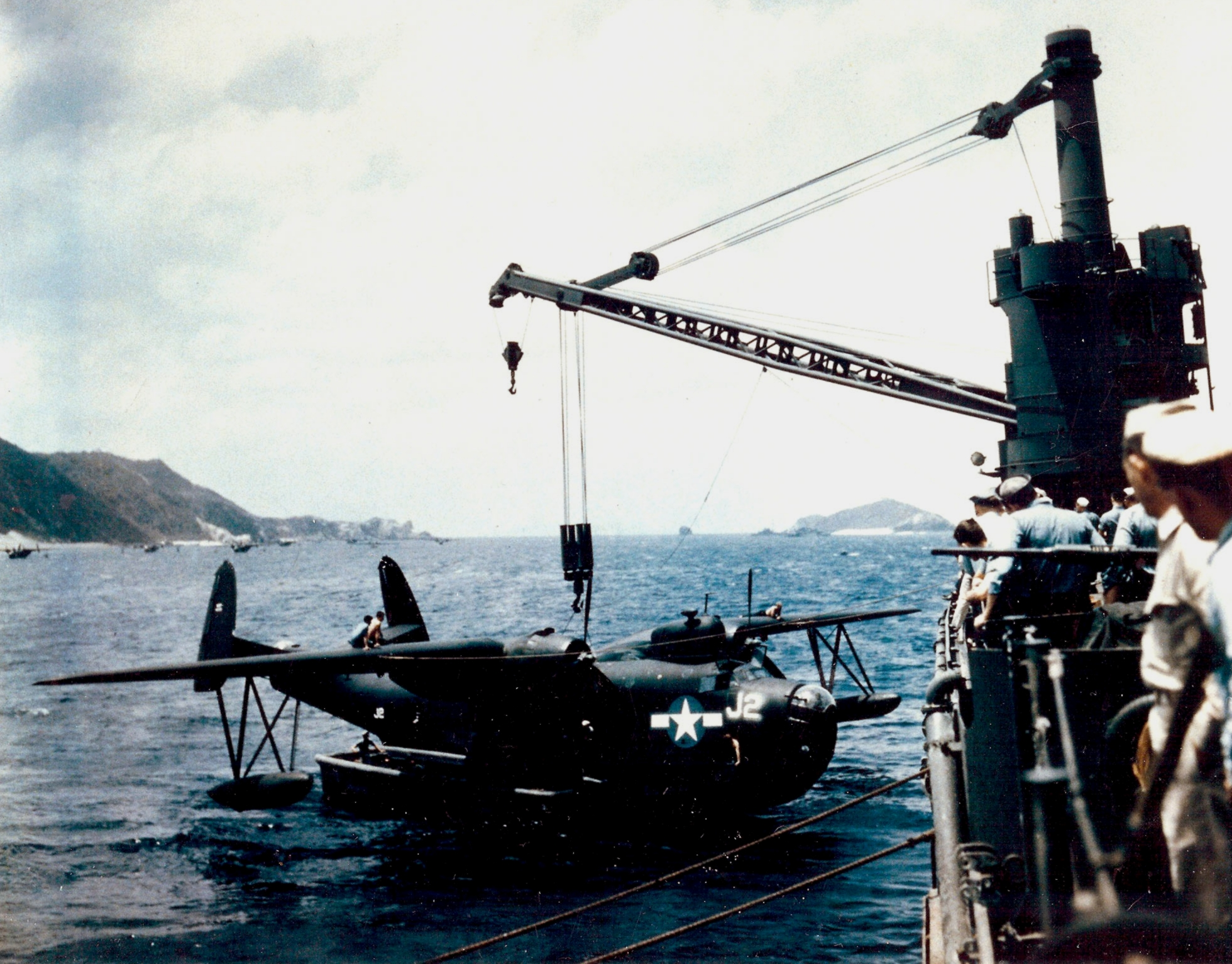
- VPB-26 PBM-5 being hoisted onto USS Norton Sound at Kerama Retto c.May 1945
- Active: 1 May 1944 – 14 December 1946
- Country: United States of America
- Branch: United States Navy
- Type: squadron
- Role: Maritime patrol
- Engagements: World War II

Aircraft flown
- Patrol: PBM-3D/5

VP-26 was a Patrol Squadron of the U.S. Navy. The squadron was established as Patrol Squadron 26 (VP-26) on 1 May 1944, redesignated Patrol Bombing Squadron 26 (VPB-26) on 1 October 1944, redesignated Patrol Squadron 26 (VP-26) on 15 May 1946 and disestablished on 14 December 1946. It was the second squadron to be designated VP-26, the first VP-26 was redesignated VP-14 on 1 July 1941.

== Operational history ==
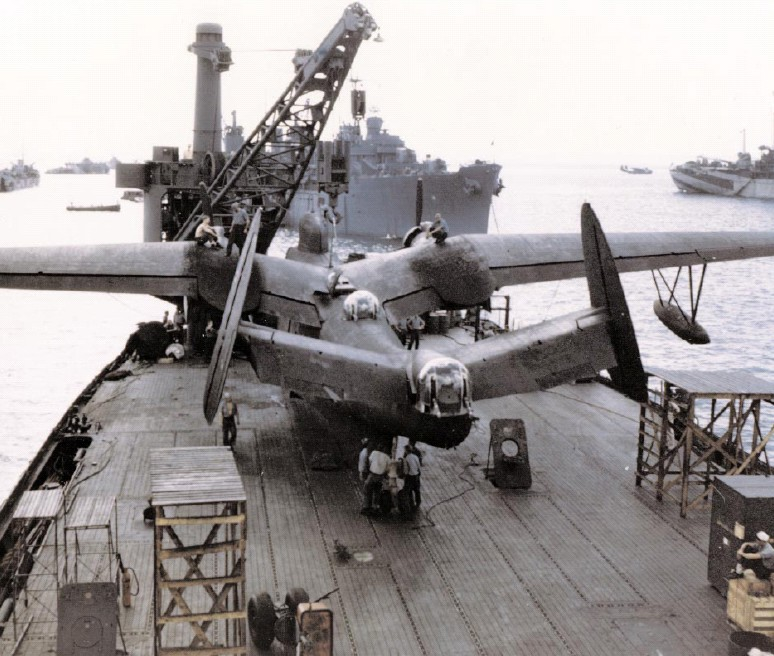
VPB-26 PBM-5 on USS Norton Sound, Guam, April 1945

- 1 May 1944: VP-26 was established at NAS Norfolk, Virginia, as a patrol squadron flying the PBM-3D Mariner seaplane. During the training period the squadron came under the operational control of FAW-5.
- 11 May 1944: The squadron moved to NAS Charleston, South Carolina. Operational training was conducted in the Charleston vicinity and during July in the NAS Jacksonville, Florida and NAS Pensacola, Florida, areas for Anti-submarine warfare (ASW) training.
- 2 September – October 1944: VP-26 relocated to NAS Alameda, California in preparation for a trans-Pacific flight to NAS Kaneohe Bay, Hawaii. Administrative control of the squadron was transferred to FAW-8 at that time. The ground support personnel departed NAS Alameda for NAS Kaneohe Bay, aboard USS Thetis Bay on 15 September 1945. The squadron aircraftand aircrews departed Alameda for Kaneohe by sections throughout the month of October.
- 2 November 1944: VPB-26 was officially in operation at NAS Kaneohe Bay, with operational control transferred to FAW-2. Detachments had already been established at Hilo (10 crews) aboard USS Cumberland Sound and at NAS Kaneohe (6 crews) aboard USS Bering Strait on 29 October 1944.
- November 1944 – January 1945: The squadron received new PBM-5 replacement aircraft during the month. Training with the new aircraft and operational patrols in the vicinity of the Hawaiian Islands continued through mid-January 1945.
- 25 January 1945: VPB-26 departed NAS Kaneohe Bay for NAB Parry Island, Eniwetok. The squadron operated under the operational control of TG 96.1, conducting searches, reconnaissance, Dumbo (air-sea rescue) missions, convoy escort and hunter-killer missions. Occasional reconnaissance flights were conducted over enemy-held Ponape and Wake islands.
- 30 January 1945: A two-aircraft detachment was sent to Saipan for Dumbo missions and long-range searches. The detachment was later moved to Iwo Jima during the campaign for that island.
- 19 April 1945: The remainder of VPB-26 joined the detachment at Tanapag Harbor, Saipan, coming under the operational control of FAW-1. Duties included searches and night antishipping patrols.
- 20 April 1945: A detachment of five aircraft and crews was sent to the Kerama Islands, Okinawa. The remainder of the squadron joined the detachment on 27 April
- July 1945: Relief crews for squadron crew rotation began arriving from the US. Combat antishipping patrols continued throughout this period.
- 15 July 1945: VPB-26 relocated from Kerama to Chimu Airfield, Okinawa. Long-range searches and antishipping patrols continued from this location.
- 25 July 1945: A two-aircraft detachment was sent to operate with the Third Fleet to provide Dumbo coverage during the carrier-based attacks on the Japanese home islands.
- 28–30 August 1945: Squadron ground personnel and four flight crews arrived in Tokyo Bay aboard USS Cumberland Sound, part of the first group of Allied warships to enter Tokyo Bay. On 30 August the squadron’s PBM-5s landed in Tokyo Bay, the first squadron to be based in and operating from Japan.
- 1 September – 31 January 1946: The squadron assumed a peacetime role of neutrality patrols, while Japanese units were disarmed and returned to the home islands. Ferry flights and transportation of high-priority supply items comprised the rest of the squadron’s duties.
- 31 January–12 October 1946: The squadron moved between Shanghai and Qingdao, China and Sasebo, Japan during this period. Their primary functions were air-sea rescue operations, courier and transportation flights. On 12 October 1946 the squadron was transferred to Commander Fleet Air West Coast and ordered back to the United States for disestablishment.
- 14 December 1946: VP-26 was disestablished.

== Aircraft assignments ==
The squadron was assigned the following aircraft, effective on the dates shown:

- PBM-3D - May 1944
- PBM-5 - November 1944

== Home port assignments ==
The squadron was assigned to these home ports, effective on the dates shown:

- NAS Norfolk, Virginia - 1 May 1944
- NAS Charleston, South Carolina - 11 May 1944
- NAS Alameda, California - 2 September 1944
- NAS Kaneohe Bay, Hawaii - 2 November 1944
- West Coast, U.S. - October 1946

== See also ==
- Maritime patrol aircraft
- List of inactive United States Navy aircraft squadrons
- List of United States Navy aircraft squadrons
- List of squadrons in the Dictionary of American Naval Aviation Squadrons
- History of the United States Navy
