= VPB-198 =

Patrol Bombing Squadron 198
- Active: 12 September 1944 – 1 April 1946
- Country: United States of America
- Branch: United States Navy
- Type: Squadron
- Role: Maritime patrol
- Garrison/HQ: NAS Moffett

Aircraft flown
- Patrol: PV-1; PV-2

VPB-198 was a Patrol Bombing Squadron of the U.S. Navy. The squadron was established as Bombing Squadron 198 (VB-198) on 12 September 1944, redesignated Patrol Bombing Squadron 198 (VPB-198) on 1 October 1944 and disestablished on 1 April 1946.

== Operational history ==
- 12 September 1944: VB-198 was established at NAS Moffett Field, California, under the operational control of FAW-8, as an Operational Training Unit flying the PV-1 Ventura. The mission of the squadron was to train and supply pilots and crews for all operational squadrons in the Pacific. Formerly, entire squadrons had been rotated back to the U.S. upon relief, but the new Integrated Aeronautics Program called for rotation of personnel and aircraft only. The first four crews to complete the training program departed on 20 November to relieve combat zone personnel who had completed their tours. On the average, 26 flight crews were undergoing training in different phases of the syllabus.
- April 1945: The original 20 war-weary PV-1 Venturas used by the squadron for training were replaced by new PV-2 Harpoons.
- 1 April 1946: VPB-198 was disestablished at NAS Moffett Field.

== Commanding officers ==
- Lieutenant Marion D. Trewhitt: 12 September 1944
- Lieutenant Commander Alexander B Dusenberry: 5 January 1945
- LCdr. Lloyd F. Jakeman: 12 January 1945

== Aircraft assignments ==
The squadron was assigned the following aircraft, effective on the dates shown:

- PV-1 - September 1944
- PV-2 - April 1945

== Home port assignments ==
The squadron was assigned to these home ports, effective on the dates shown:

- NAS Moffett Field, California - 12 September 1944

== See also ==
- Maritime patrol aircraft
- List of inactive United States Navy aircraft squadrons
- List of United States Navy aircraft squadrons
- List of squadrons in the Dictionary of American Naval Aviation Squadrons
- History of the United States Navy
