= VPB-141 =

Patrol Bombing Squadron 141
- Active: 1 June 1943 – 16 June 1945
- Country: United States of America
- Branch: United States Navy
- Type: squadron
- Role: Maritime patrol
- Engagements: World War II

Aircraft flown
- Patrol: PV-1; PV-2

VPB-141 was a Patrol Bombing Squadron of the U.S. Navy. The squadron was established as Bombing Squadron 141 (VB-141) on 1 June 1943, redesignated Patrol Bombing Squadron 141 (VPB-141) on 1 October 1944 and disestablished on 16 June 1945.

== Operational history ==
- 1 June 1943: VB-141 was established at NAS DeLand, Florida, under the operational control of FAW-12, as a medium bombing squadron flying the PV-1 Ventura. Ground training and introduction to the flying characteristics of the Ventura continued through 19 July, when the squadron was sent to NAAF Boca Chica, Florida, for advanced Anti-submarine warfare (ASW) training and shakedown.
- 9 August 1943: VB-141 was deployed to NAS Guantanamo Bay, Cuba, under the operational control of FAW-11. Assignments consisted of convoy coverage over the Caribbean routes and occasional ASW sweeps.
- 1 October 1943: The squadron was relocated to NAS San Juan, Puerto Rico. Assignments continued as before until 10 October when a detachment of six aircraft was sent to Atkinson Field, British Guiana. On the next day, a second detachment of six aircraft was sent to NAAF Edinburgh Field, Trinidad, British West Indies. Convoy coverage and ASW sweeps were continued from both locations. Most of the squadron patrols covered the inshore areas, while PBM and PBY squadrons assigned to those bases took the patrol sectors further out.
- 18 October 1943: Both VB-141 detachments were assigned to Trinidad, until 29 October when one of the detachments was sent to NAF Hato Field, Curaçao.
- 13 November 1943: Lieutenant (jg) Leck M. Evans and his crew of four failed to return from a patrol mission and were listed as missing.
- 15 November 1943: The Trinidad detachment joined the detachment at NAF Hato Field.
- 19 December 1943: The squadron's only sighting of a U-boat was made on this date, a few days after a U.S. tanker, SS McDowell, had been sunk. VB-141 conducted continuous sweeps in the area until the U-boat surfaced at 16:30 on 19 December. One attack was delivered with negative results before the U-boat submerged and made good its escape.
- 22 December 1943: Lieutenant (jg) William W. Lomas and his crew of five were killed in a crash while taking off on a routine night convoy coverage mission.
- January 1944: Commander, Caribbean Sea Frontier called off the continuous convoy coverage patrols for Ventura squadrons. Instead, daily patrols of one to five missions per day were substituted, except when a positive U-boat sighting was made.
- 19 March 1944: A six-aircraft detachment was sent to NAS Coco Solo, Panama Canal Zone.
- 7 April 1944: The nine aircraft remaining at Curaçao returned to NAS San Juan. Over the next several months, a four-aircraft detachment rotated between Curaçao and San Juan. HVAR rocket launching rails were added to the aircraft at this time and 31 pilots were sent back to NAAF Boca Chica, for rocket-firing training.
- 7–8 July 1944: All of the squadron aircraft returned to NAS Beaufort, South Carolina, under the operational control of FAW-9. Convoy coverage patrols and training were the primary activities of the squadron through February 1945. During its deployments the squadron experienced severe maintenance problems with the Ventura aircraft. When stationed in the Caribbean, one of the squadron aircraft was designated to be a parts plane, so that the others could be kept in the air. Upon return to the US, with a ready supply of parts at hand, maintenance problems seemed to get worse rather than better.
- 5 October 1944: Lieutenant Dean H. Ringgenberg and two of his crew were killed in a midair collision with another aircraft over NAS Beaufort.
- February 1945: A detachment was sent to NAS Brunswick, Maine, to protect the northern convoy routes.
- April 1945: A detachment of five crews was sent to NAS Quonset Point, Rhode Island, to pick up five new PV-2 Harpoons. Training was well underway and most of the pilots were qualified on the new aircraft when a dispatch was received from BuAer grounding all PV-2 aircraft until modifications could be made to wings and tail structures. The aircraft were repaired by the HEDRON at NAS Quonset Point, and flown to the squadron at NAS Beaufort.
- 24 April – June 1945: A three-aircraft detachment was sent to MCAS Cherry Point, North Carolina, returning to NAS Beaufort on 7 May. At that time, all ASW missions were secured and primary tasking involved providing assistance to the new Air Sea Rescue units along the Atlantic coast. By the end of the month demobilization planning was underway, with many personnel being detached prior to disestablishment of the squadron. VPB-141 was officially disestablished at NAS Beaufort on 16 June 1945.

== Aircraft assignments ==
The squadron was assigned the following aircraft, effective on the dates shown:

- PV-1 - July 1943
- PV-2 - April 1945

== Home port assignments ==
The squadron was assigned to these home ports, effective on the dates shown:

- NAS DeLand, Florida - 1 June 1943
- NAAF Boca Chica, Florida - 19 July 1943
- NAS Guantanamo Bay, Cuba - 9 August 1943
- NAS San Juan, Puerto Rico - 1 October 1943
- NAAF Edinburgh Field, Trinidad, British West Indies - 18 October 1943
- NAF Hato Field, Curaçao - 15 November 1943
- NAS Beaufort, South Carolina - 7 July 1944

== See also ==
- Maritime patrol aircraft
- List of inactive United States Navy aircraft squadrons
- List of United States Navy aircraft squadrons
- List of squadrons in the Dictionary of American Naval Aviation Squadrons
- History of the United States Navy
