= VPB-199 =

Patrol Bombing Squadron 199
- Active: 1 October 1944 – 2 November 1945
- Country: United States of America
- Branch: United States Navy
- Type: squadron
- Role: Maritime patrol

Aircraft flown
- Patrol: PV-1; PV-2

VPB-199 was a Patrol Bombing Squadron of the U.S. Navy. The squadron was established as Patrol Bombing Squadron 199 (VPB-199) on 1 October 1944 and disestablished on 2 November 1945.

== Operational history ==
- 1 October 1944: VPB-199 was established at NAS Whidbey Island, Washington, under the operational control of FAW-6, as an Operational Training Unit flying the PV-1 Ventura. The mission of the squadron was to train and supply pilots and crews for all operational squadrons in the Pacific. Formerly, entire squadrons had been rotated back to the U.S. upon relief; but the new Integrated Aeronautics Program called for rotation of personnel and aircraft only.
- August 1945: PV-2 Harpoons were received as replacements for worn-out PV-1 Venturas.
- 2 August 1945: At 23:30 hours, while engaged in a scheduled night flight, Lieutenant Jay R. Ellenberger and his crew of four were killed when their PV-2 Harpoon crashed and burned about 11 miles (18 km) south of Port Angeles, Washington. Although no cause could be determined for the accident, it was noted that all of the squadron crews were at that time in the process of transitioning from the older PV-1 Ventura to the more powerful PV-2 Harpoon. Lack of familiarity with the newer aircraft could have contributed to the crash, or wing spar problems found in the early PV-2 models could have been responsible.
- 2 November 1945: VPB-199 was disestablished at NAS Whidbey Island. During its one year of existence the squadron trained 204 combat aircrews.

== Aircraft assignments ==
The squadron was assigned the following aircraft, effective on the dates shown:

- PV-1 - October 1944
- PV-2 - August 1945

== Home port assignments ==
The squadron was assigned to these home ports, effective on the dates shown:

- NAS Whidbey Island, Washington - 1 October 1944

== See also ==
- Maritime patrol aircraft
- List of inactive United States Navy aircraft squadrons
- List of United States Navy aircraft squadrons
- List of squadrons in the Dictionary of American Naval Aviation Squadrons
- History of the United States Navy
