= VP-AM-5 =

Amphibian Patrol Squadron 5
- Active: 21 November 1946 – 31 December 1947
- Country: United States of America
- Branch: United States Navy
- Type: squadron
- Role: Maritime patrol

Aircraft flown
- Patrol: PBY-5A

VP-AM-5 was a Amphibian Patrol Squadron of the U.S. Navy. The squadron was established as Amphibious Patrol Squadron 5 (VP-AM-5) on 21 November 1946 and disestablished on 31 December 1947.

== Operational history ==
- 21 November 1946: VP-AM-5 was established at NAS Whidbey Island, Washington, as a medium amphibious seaplane squadron equipped with the PBY-5A Catalina. During its brief existence, the squadron came under the operational control of FAW-4 with a mission of weather reconnaissance and surveillance.
- 31 December 1947: Due to the absence of any perceived threat from the northern Pacific and congressional mandates to reduce force levels, the squadron was soon placed on the list of those scheduled for disestablishment. New, longer-range aircraft then coming into service, such as the P2V Neptune, negated the need for slower, more vulnerable seaplanes and so VP-AM-5 was disestablished at NAS Whidbey Island.

== Aircraft assignments ==
The squadron was assigned the following aircraft, effective on the dates shown:

- PBY-5A - November 1946

== Home port assignments ==
The squadron was assigned to these home ports, effective on the dates shown:

- NAS Whidbey Island, Washington - 21 November 1946

== See also ==
- Maritime patrol aircraft
- List of inactive United States Navy aircraft squadrons
- List of United States Navy aircraft squadrons
- List of squadrons in the Dictionary of American Naval Aviation Squadrons
- History of the United States Navy
