= VA-154 (U.S. Navy) =

Attack Squadron 154
- Active: 26 March 1945 – 1 December 1949
- Country: United States
- Branch: United States Navy
- Type: Attack
- Nickname(s): Uninvited

Aircraft flown
- Attack: SB2C Helldiver; AD-2 Skyraider

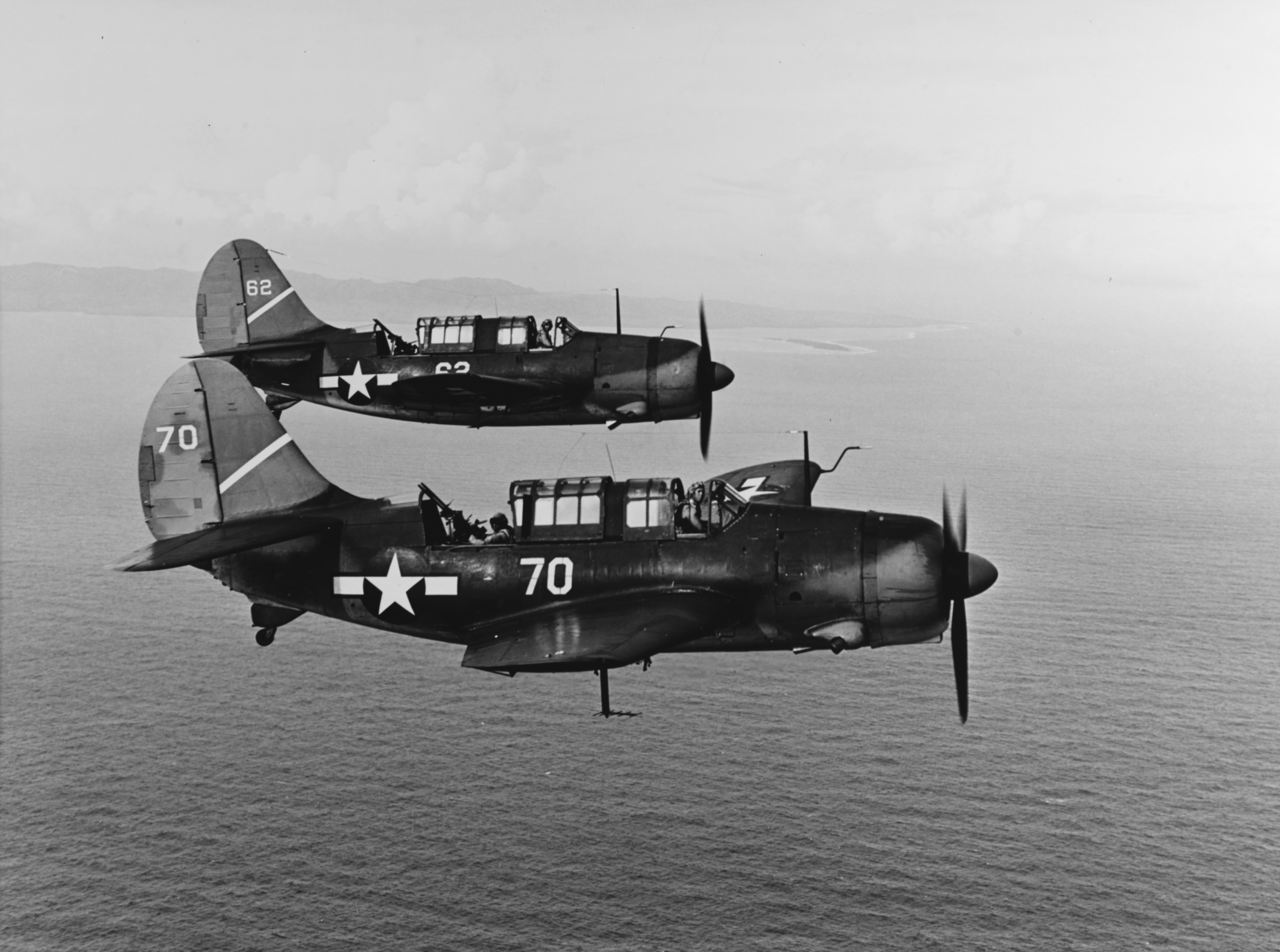
Two SB2C Helldiver dive bombers in flight in 1943. VA-154 flew similar aircraft.

VA-154 was an Attack Squadron of the United States Navy. It was established as Bombing Squadron VB-153 on 26 March 1945, redesignated as VA-15A on 15 November 1946, and finally designated as VA-154 on 15 July 1948. In October 1945, the squadron participated in a 1,200-plane flyover of New York City in honor of Navy Day. The squadron was disestablished on 1 December 1949.

== Home port assignments ==
The squadron was assigned to these home ports, effective on the dates shown:

- NAAS Manteo – 26 Mar 1945
- NAS Wildwood – 7 Apr 1945
- NAAS Oceana – 31 May 1945
- NAS Norfolk – Jul 1946
- NAS Alameda – 7 Aug 1946

== Aircraft assignment ==
The squadron first received the following aircraft on the dates shown:

- SB2C-4E Helldiver – Apr 1945
- SB2C-5 Helldiver – Jun 1945
- AD-2 Skyraider – 8 Jul 1948

== See also ==
- List of squadrons in the Dictionary of American Naval Aviation Squadrons
- Attack aircraft
- List of inactive United States Navy aircraft squadrons
- History of the United States Navy
