= VPB-132 =

Patrol Bombing Squadron 132
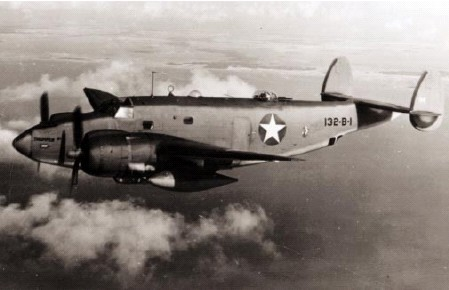
- VP-132 PV-1 in 1943
- Active: 15 March 1943 – 30 May 1945
- Country: United States of America
- Branch: United States Navy
- Type: squadron
- Role: Maritime patrol
- Engagements: World War II

Aircraft flown
- Patrol: PV-1

VPB-132 was a Patrol Bombing Squadron of the U.S. Navy. The squadron was established as Bombing Squadron 132 (VB-132) on 15 March 1943, redesignated Patrol Bombing Squadron 132 (VPB-132) on 1 October 1944 and disestablished on 30 May 1945.

== Operational history ==
- 15 March 1943: VB-132 was established at NAS DeLand, Florida, under the operational control of FAW-12, as a medium bombing squadron flying the PV-1 Ventura. Ground school and orientation to the Ventura was completed on 14 June when the squadron was relocated to NAAF Boca Chica, Florida, for shakedown and advanced Anti-submarine warfare (ASW) training. On 5 July the squadron completed this phase of training and remained at NAAF Boca Chica for operational ASW patrols under Commander Gulf Sea Frontier.
- 14 May 1943: Lieutenant (jg) Robert L.Wist and three of his crew were killed in a crash during a night training flight.
- 22 June 1943: Lieutenant Lawrence J. Carl and his crew of four were killed in a crash during a search mission.
- 4 August 1943: A six-aircraft detachment was sent to NAF San Julián, Cuba, for ASW sweeps of convoy routes in the Caribbean. The detachment rejoined the squadron at NAAF Boca Chica on 13 October 1943.
- 18 October 1943: VB-132 was transferred to NAS Quonset Point, Rhode Island, for training under AsDevLant in HVAR rocket-projectile training.
- 10 December 1943: VB-132 was deployed to NAS Port Lyautey, French Morocco, under the operational control of FAW-15, arriving for duty on 24 December 1943. Because there was not enough room on the aircraft for everyone in the squadron, 15 enlisted personnel travelled aboard the tender USS Albemarle to Port Lyautey, having left for that purpose on 19 November. The squadron flew a circuitous route through Florida; Puerto Rico; Belem, Brazil; Natal, Brazil; RAF Ascension Island; Liberia, Africa; Mauritania, West Africa; Tindouf, Algeria; and Marrakech, French Morocco. Primary duties assigned were ASW patrols in cooperation with elements of the 8th Fleet in the Mediterranean.
- 10 January 1944: Lieutenant Edward P. Wood and his crew of five were killed in a crash at sea during an ASW patrol 30 miles (48 km) west of NAS Port Lyautey.
- 7 February 1944: VB-132 was relocated to Advance Base Unit Number One, NAF Agadir, French Morocco, becoming operational on 14 February. A six-aircraft detachment was returned to NAS Port Lyautey on the 14th to conduct ASW patrols in the waters around Gibraltar. The primary mission of the squadron at this location was to provide ASW coverage for the Canary Islands.
- 1 July 1944: Ensign Louie H. Hatchett and four of his crew were killed in a crash during a gunnery training flight 20 miles (32 km) northwest of NAS Port Lyautey. On this date the squadron began receiving pilots and crews of Free French Patrol Squadron 1 (VFP-1) for training. The orientation course on the PV-1 Ventura was completed on 16 November 1944. When all squadron aircraft, supplies and equipment were turned over to VFP-1.
- 16 October 1944: Lieutenant (jg) Thomas J. Galvin and his crew of four were killed in a crash near Naples, Italy, while on temporary duty with the HEDRON, FAW-15.
- 19 November 1944: VPB-132 was relieved for return to the U.S., arriving at NAS Norfolk, Virginia, on 24 November. All hands were given home leave. The squadron was reformed at NAS Norfolk on 28 December 1944, under the operational control of FAW-5.
- 1 February 1945: VPB-132 was transferred to NAS New York, New York, with the Fleet Air Detachment under operational control of FAW-9 and CTG 02.7, ComEastSeaFron. The squadron conducted ASW sweeps and patrols over the convoy lanes leading into New York Harbor.
- 14 March 1945: Naval Aviation Mobile Training Unit #103 arrived at NAS New York to train VPB-132 personnel in the operation of PB4Y-2 Privateers. No Privateer aircraft were assigned to the squadron at this time. Training proceeded with the three aircraft that MTU103 brought with them.
- 21–30 May 1945: VPB-132 received orders to disestablish. All aircraft were flown to NAS Clinton, Oklahoma, on 23 May. All personnel were transferred to NAS Quonset Point on 25 May. On 30 May 1945, VPB-132 was officially disestablished at NAS Quonset Point.

== Aircraft assignments ==
The squadron was assigned the following aircraft, effective on the dates shown:

- PV-1 - 15 March 1943

== Home port assignments ==
The squadron was assigned to these home ports, effective on the dates shown:

- NAS DeLand, Florida - 15 March 1943
- NAAF Boca Chica, Florida - 14 June 1943
- NAS Quonset Point, Rhode Island - 18 October 1943
- NAS Port Lyautey, French Morocco - 10 December 1943
- NAAF Agadir, French Morocco - 7 February 1944
- NAS Norfolk, Virginia - 19 November 1944
- NAS New York, New York - 1 February 1945
- NAS Quonset Point - 25 May 1945

== See also ==
- Maritime patrol aircraft
- List of inactive United States Navy aircraft squadrons
- List of United States Navy aircraft squadrons
- List of squadrons in the Dictionary of American Naval Aviation Squadrons
- History of the United States Navy
