= VP-51 =

Patrol Squadron 51
- Active: 1 April 1948 – 1 February 1950
- Country: United States of America
- Branch: United States Navy
- Type: Maritime patrol squadron
- Role: Maritime patrol

Aircraft flown
- Patrol: PB-1W; PB4Y-2

VP-51 was a Patrol Squadron of the U.S. Navy. The squadron was established as Air Early Warning Squadron 1 (VPW-1) on 1 April 1948, redesignated Patrol Squadron 51 (VP-51) on 1 September 1948 and disestablished on 1 February 1950. It was the third squadron to be designated VP-51; the first VP-51 was redesignated VP-71 on 1 July 1941 and the second VP-51 was redesignated VB-101 on 1 March 1943.

== Operational history ==
- 1 April 1948: VPW-1 was established at NAS Quonset Point, Rhode Island, as an Air Early Warning (AEW) squadron flying the PB-1W Flying Fortress. Some of the personnel identified for assignment to VPW-1 had been ordered to VX-4 for training on the PB-1W aircraft prior to their unit being established as a separate squadron. Another group of personnel for VPW-1 was located at Kwajalein Atoll participating in Operation Sandstone when the squadron was established. This detachment consisted of 17 officers and 29 enlisted personnel. The detachment's mission during this operation was to patrol a designated danger area during hours of darkness to ensure no unauthorized craft entered the atomic experimental test area. Immediately following the squadron's establishment at NAS Quonset Point it was assigned a new home port at NAAS Ream Field, Imperial Beach, California.
- 2–3 April 1948: The squadron received its first four PB-1Ws on 2 April. These aircraft had been B-17G's, held by the U.S. Army Air Force in reserve storage, and released to the Navy for modification by the NAMU Johnsville, Pennsylvania. The AN/APS-20 search radar was installed, with a distinctive large fairing projecting from the chin of the aircraft for the scanning unit. The bomb bays were sealed since no weapons were carried and extra fuel tanks were installed to increase range. On 3 April the squadron began the move to its new home port at NAAS Ream Field.
- April – May 1948: The squadron participated in various fleet radar relay and search and rescue exercises.
- 29 May 1948: The squadron's Kwajalein Detachment return to NAAS Ream Field.
- 7 July 1948: VPW-1 was relocated to NAS Miramar, north of San Diego, California.
- July 1948: The squadron established a detachment at NAS Agana, Guam. The detachment operated under the control of FAW-1. The primary mission of the detachment was typhoon reconnaissance.
- 1 September 1948: The squadron was redesignated VP-51. VP-51 was the first operational land-based AEW squadron. The primary mission of the squadron was Anti-submarine warfare (ASW) but it was also responsible for developing, improving and evaluating all aspects relating to the operational use of AEW.
- May 1949: VP-51 received the PB4Y-2 Privateer to replace the PB-1W aircraft being taken out of service.
- July – August 1949: The squadron participated in AEW intercept exercises in July and August and ASW hunter/killer exercises in August.
- 1 February 1950: VP-51 was disestablished at NAS Miramar. Personnel from the disestablished squadron were used to form a detachment of VX-4.

== Aircraft assignments ==
The squadron was assigned the following aircraft, effective on the dates shown:

- PB-1W - 2 April 1948
- PB4Y-2 - June 1949

== Home port assignments ==
The squadron was assigned to these home ports, effective on the dates shown:

- NAS Quonset Point, Rhode Island - 1 April 1948
- NAS Ream Field, California - 3 April 1948
- NAS Miramar, California - 1 August 1948

== See also ==
- Maritime patrol aircraft
- List of inactive United States Navy aircraft squadrons
- List of United States Navy aircraft squadrons
- List of squadrons in the Dictionary of American Naval Aviation Squadrons
- History of the United States Navy
