= VA-776 (U.S. Navy) =

Attack Squadron 776
- Active: 1968
- Country: United States of America
- Branch: United States Navy Reserve

Aircraft flown
- Attack: A-4 Skyhawk

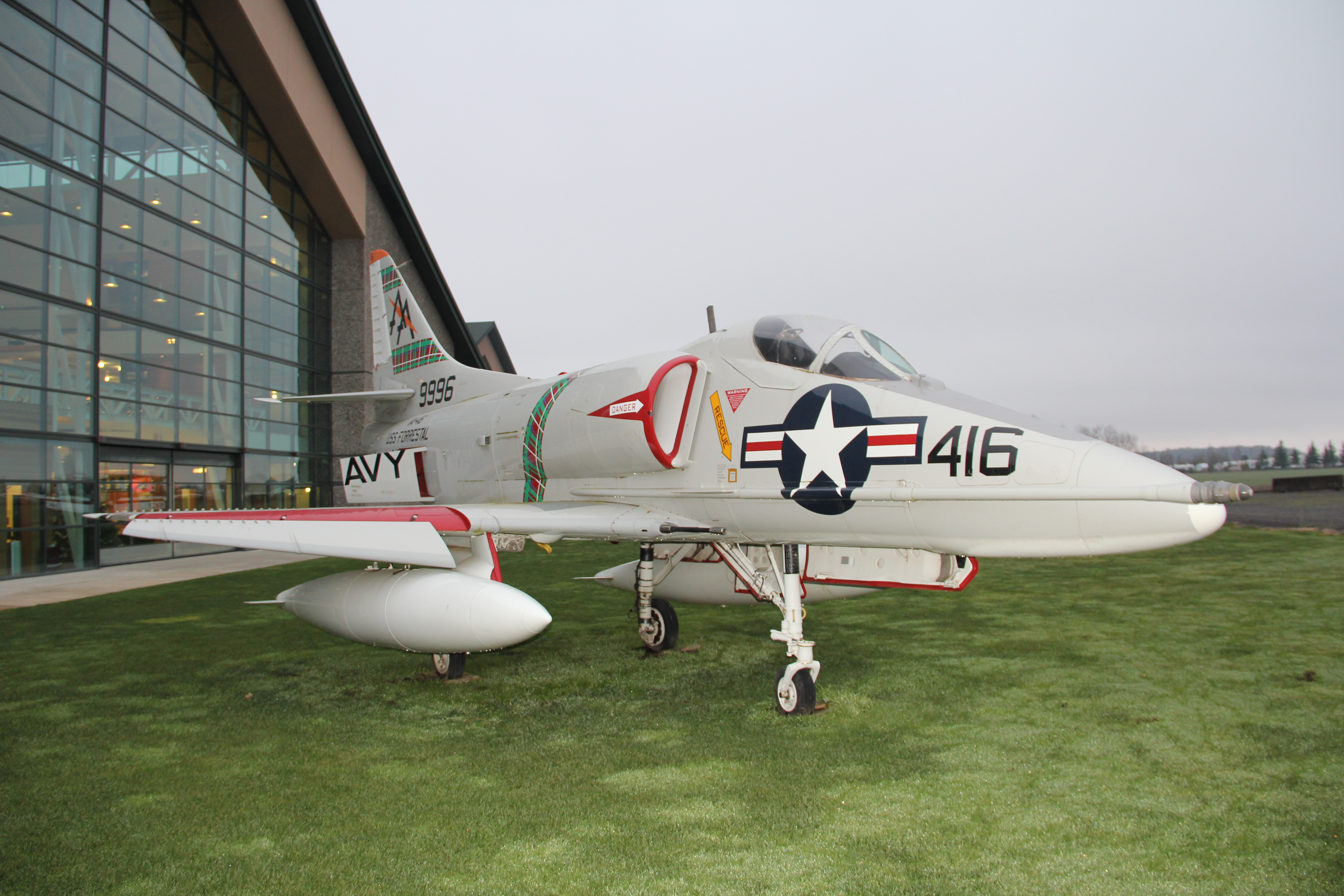
A-4E Skyhawk similar to those flown by VA-776.

VA-776 was an Attack Squadron of the U.S. Navy Reserve. Details of its early years are sketchy, as few records exist for reserve squadrons prior to 1970, the year during which they began submitting history reports.

On 27 Jan 1968, The President directed the activation of VA-776 following the capture of USS Pueblo (AGER-2) by a North Korean patrol boat on four days earlier. The squadron was deactivated and returned to reserve status on 18 October 1968.

== Home port assignments ==
The squadron was assigned to these home ports, effective on the dates shown:

- NAAS Los Alamitos – 27 Jan 1968
- NAS Lemoore – 13 Jun 1968

== Aircraft assignment ==
The squadron first received the following aircraft on the dates shown:

- A-4B Skyhawk – Feb 1968
- TA-4F Skyhawk – Jun 1968
- A-4E Skyhawk – Jun 1968

== See also ==
- List of squadrons in the Dictionary of American Naval Aviation Squadrons
- Attack aircraft
- List of inactive United States Navy aircraft squadrons
- History of the United States Navy
