= VPB-126 =

Patrol Bombing Squadron 126
- Active: 15 September 1941 – 11 January 1950
- Country: United States of America
- Branch: United States Navy
- Type: squadron
- Role: Maritime patrol
- Engagements: World War II

Aircraft flown
- Patrol: PBY-5A; PBO-1; PV-1

VPB-126 was a Patrol Bombing Squadron of the U.S. Navy. The squadron was established as Patrol Squadron 93 (VP-93) on 5 January 1942, redesignated Bombing Squadron 126 (VB-126) on 1 March 1943, redesignated Patrol Bombing Squadron 126 (VPB-126) on 1 October 1944 and disestablished on 27 June 1945.

== Operational history ==
- 5 January 1942: The squadron was established at NAS Norfolk, Virginia, under the operational control of Patrol Wing 9. The men and material assigned to the squadron had been sent to NAS Banana River, Florida, for flight training in the PBM Mariner seaplane, however, due to the shortage in Mariner aircraft, the squadron personnel were transferred to NAS Norfolk where most of the first month of training was conducted in PBY-5A Catalinas. Cross-country flying and navigation skills were improved when the squadron was assigned the mission to ferry PBY aircraft from the West Coast back east.
- 5 April 1942: The squadron received orders to transfer to NAS Quonset Point, Rhode Island, in preparation for overseas deployment.
- 12 May 1942: VP-93 deployed to NAS Argentia, Newfoundland. The squadron was ready for combat operations on 20 May, under the tactical control of Patrol Wing 7 and administrative control of Patrol Wing 9. The squadron split into two detachments, with one remaining at NAS Argentia and the other in Greenland. USS Pocomoke, anchored in Placentia Harbor, Argentia, Newfoundland, provided the supply and maintenance facilities critical to the squadron's upkeep in the frigid conditions of the North Atlantic. Convoy coverage was extremely difficult due to constant heavy fog and frequent failures of the primitive radar sets in use by the squadron at the time. Weather was the direct cause of death for Lieutenant (jg) Wilson B. Rippey and his crew, who were forced to set down on the surface after losing their bearings. Rescue aircraft could not locate Rippey and his crew before heavy seas sank their aircraft.
- 1 September – December 1942: A detachment of squadron aircrews was sent to NAS Quonset Point for checkout in the PBO-1 aircraft. The decision had been made to replace the squadron's PBY-5A aircraft with the PV-1, an improved version of the PBO, when sufficient numbers of the former became available. By the completion of training enough aircraft had been received to outfit the squadron. These were ferried back to NAS Argentia on 2 December 1942. Three of the PBY-5As were retained for utility work and the rest of the Catalinas were flown back to the U.S. With the conversion of the squadron from seaplanes to landplanes, the designation of the squadron was changed to VB-126.
- 17 June 1943: VB-126 returned to NAS Quonset Point, after a 13-month deployment at NAS Argentia, coming under the operational control of FAW-9. By this date, the Battle of the Atlantic had essentially been won and no replacement squadrons were sent to NAS Argentia. The squadron spent the next year and a half divided into detachments at NAS Quonset Point, NAS New York and MCAS Cherry Point, North Carolina.
- 10 January – June 1945: VPB-126 departed NAS New York, for deployment to NAF Natal, Brazil. Soon after arrival, the squadron split into detachments with sections at various times at Fortaleza, Brazil, and RAF Ascension Island. The routine of daily patrols was broken on 3 May 1945 by a two-week period of training for eight pilots in the use of wing-mounted HVAR rockets at Maceió, Brazil. The lack of enemy activity and the general winding down of the war effort resulted in the return of the squadron to the U.S. on 21 May 1945. Upon arrival at NAS Floyd Bennett Field, New York, the squadron began preparations for disestablishment. The formal disestablishment took place on 27 June 1945.

== Aircraft assignments ==
The squadron was assigned the following aircraft, effective on the dates shown:

- PBY-5A - 5 January 1942
- PBO-1 - September 1942
- PV-1 - 1 March 1943

== Home port assignments ==
The squadron was assigned to these home ports, effective on the dates shown:

- NAS Norfolk, Virginia - 5 January 1942
- NAS Quonset Point, Rhode Island - 5 April 1942
- NAS New York, New York - December 1943
- NAF Natal, Brazil - January 1945
- NAS Floyd Bennett Field, New York - 21 May 1945

== See also ==
- Maritime patrol aircraft
- List of inactive United States Navy aircraft squadrons
- List of United States Navy aircraft squadrons
- List of squadrons in the Dictionary of American Naval Aviation Squadrons
- History of the United States Navy
