= VP-6 (1924–1926) =

U.S. Navy Patrol Squadron

Patrol Squadron 6
- Active: 29 May 1924 – 3 May 1926
- Country: United States of America
- Branch: United States Navy
- Type: squadron
- Role: Maritime patrol

Aircraft flown
- Patrol: F5L

VP-6 was a Patrol Squadron of the U.S. Navy. The squadron was established as Patrol Squadron 6 (VP-6) on 29 May 1924 and removed from the records on 3 May 1926.

== Operational history ==
- 29 May 1924: VP-6 was scheduled for establishment using naval station assets (two F-5L seaplanes) at NAS Hampton Roads, Virginia. Prior to the designation of patrol squadrons, each naval station had maintained a small section of flying boats and float planes. These aircraft, pilots and support personnel formed the cadre of the first true patrol squadrons in the Navy. Unfortunately, documentation does not exist to verify that this squadron was actually established. It appears to have been a paper squadron listed in the records, but never formed.
- 3 May 1926: VP-6 was removed from the records.

== Aircraft assignments ==
The squadron was assigned the following aircraft, effective on the dates shown:

- F5L – 1924

== Home port assignments ==
The squadron was assigned to these home ports, effective on the dates shown:

- NAS Hampton Roads, Virginia – Scheduled for 1924

== See also ==
- Maritime patrol aircraft
- List of inactive United States Navy aircraft squadrons
- List of United States Navy aircraft squadrons
- List of squadrons in the Dictionary of American Naval Aviation Squadrons
- History of the United States Navy
