= VPB-113 =

Patrol Bombing Squadron 113
- Active: 18 August 1943 – 28 May 1945
- Country: United States of America
- Branch: United States Navy
- Type: squadron
- Role: Maritime patrol
- Engagements: World War II

Aircraft flown
- Patrol: PB4Y-1

VPB-113 was a Patrol Bombing Squadron of the U.S. Navy. The squadron was established as Bombing Squadron 113 (VB-113) on 18 August 1943, redesignated Patrol Bombing Squadron 113 (VPB-113) on 1 October 1944, and disestablished on 28 May 1945.

== Operational history ==
- 18 August – December 1943: VB-113 was established at NAAS Oceana, Virginia, under the operational control of FAW-5, as a heavy bombing squadron flying the PB4Y-1 Liberator. During the squadron's first few months of existence, its personnel received ground training using the Link Trainer, gunnery instruction, and radio basics. Flight training commenced on 5 November with the arrival of the squadron's first PB4Y-1. After shakedown, 12 aircraft were ferried to FAW-7, RAF Dunkeswell, England. On 28 December one of the ferry crews of 12 personnel aboard were killed in a crash at RAF St Mawgan, England. The war-weary Liberator that crashed was being brought back to the U.S. for disposal.
- 18 January 1944: VB-113 was relocated from NAAS Oceana to NAAS Elizabeth City, North Carolina, and a detachment was sent to NAAS Boca Chica, Florida, for advanced Anti-submarine warfare (ASW) training.
- 18 March 1944: The squadron crews ferrying aircraft to England rejoined the squadron at NAAS Elizabeth City, after an absence of four months. They had not been aboard long when orders came to relocate to NAS Norfolk, Virginia, arriving on 1 April 1944.
- 11 April 1944: The squadron was ordered to transfer 14 more replacement crews to FAW-7. On 18 April one of the crews crashed at Waller Field, Trinidad, with the loss of all hands.
- 8 May 1944: VB-113 was relocated to NAAS Boca Chica. After 30 May most squadron personnel had been sent as replacement crews to other squadrons. The squadron's primary mission was changed from fleet operations to training and maintenance. From this time until its disestablishment, VB-113 trained 145 replacement crews in ASW using aircraft assigned to the squadron.
- 28 May 1945: VPB-113 transferred its aircraft to HEDRON-5 and was disestablished at NAAS Boca Chica.

== Aircraft assignments ==
The squadron was assigned the following aircraft, effective on the dates shown:

- PB4Y-1 - November 1943

== Home port assignments ==
The squadron was assigned to these home ports, effective on the dates shown:

- NAAS Oceana, Virginia - 18 August 1943
- NAAS Elizabeth City, North Carolina - 18 January 1944
- NAS Norfolk, Virginia - 1 April 1944
- NAAS Boca Chica, Florida - 8 May 1944

== See also ==
- Maritime patrol aircraft
- List of inactive United States Navy aircraft squadrons
- List of United States Navy aircraft squadrons
- List of squadrons in the Dictionary of American Naval Aviation Squadrons
- History of the United States Navy
