= VP-93 =

Patrol Squadron 93
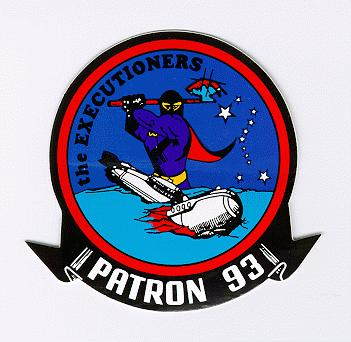
- VP-93 patch
- Active: 1 July 1976 - 30 September 1994
- Country: United States
- Branch: United States Navy
- Type: squadron
- Role: Maritime patrol
- Part of: United States Navy Reserve
- Nickname(s): Executioners

Aircraft flown
- Patrol: P-3A/B Orion

VP-93, nicknamed the Executioners, was a Patrol Squadron of the U.S. Navy Reserve. It was the second squadron to be assigned the VP-93 designation. The squadron was established on 1 July 1976 and disestablished 18 years later, on 30 September 1994. It flew the Lockheed P-3 Orion, and was based at NAF Detroit during its entire life. Units of the squadron made 17 major overseas deployments.

== Operational history ==
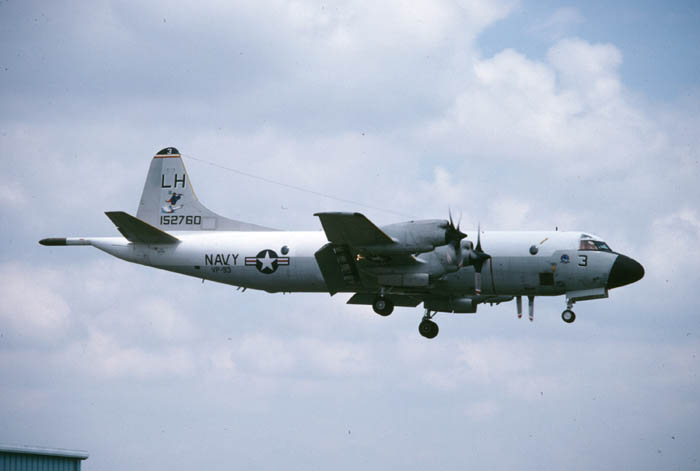
VP-93 P-3B landing at NAS Dallas May 1986

- 1 July 1976: VP-93 was the last reserve patrol squadron to be formed as part of the reorganization of the Naval Air Reserve during the 1970s. The squadron's home port was NAF Detroit, and it came under the operational and administrative control of Commander Reserve Patrol Wing, Atlantic. VP-93 began its career flying the P-3A Orion aircraft. The Executioners quickly devised a motto to go with their new nickname, Paratus Persequi—Ready to Execute.
- 8 August 1979: The National Oceanographic and Atmospheric Administration requested the assistance of the Navy in monitoring the environmental effects of the Bay of Campeche oil spill that devastated the western Gulf Coast. The mammoth oil spill was the result of a blowout on an off-shore oil well rig in early August 1979. VP-93 was tasked with flights along the path of the spill, monitoring its track and collecting a photographic record of the disaster. During the assignment the squadron was based for two weeks at NAS Corpus Christi, Texas. Several active duty Navy patrol squadrons and augment reserve squadrons participated in this mission through 31 October 1979.
- January–October 1993: VP-93 deployed to NAS Sigonella, Sicily, and Naval Station Rota, Spain, in support of Adriatic Sea embargo flights for Operation Maritime Guard against the former Republic of Yugoslavia. These were armed flights carrying Harpoon antiship missiles. The missions were flown in support of UN operations to enforce the cease-fire between warring factions of Bosnia, Serbia and Croatia, and to prevent outside factions from providing resupply by sea. The squadron also supplied single aircrews and aircraft over the period of May and June 1993 for Operation Sharp Guard. Three aircrews returned to NAS Sigonella again in October for continued Sharp Guard support. This detachment was hastily repositioned within 24 hours to NAS Key West, Florida, to provide support for operations Uphold Democracy and Able Mariner, the UN sanctioned embargo of Haiti.
- 14–24 March 1994: VP-93 flew the Navy's last operational mission of the P-3B and ended its own flight operations on 24 March 1994 after flying over 40,000 mishap-free hours.
- 17 September 1994: VP-93 disestablishment ceremonies were held at NAF Detroit, with an official disestablishment of 30 September.

== Aircraft assignment ==
The squadron first received the following aircraft on the dates shown:

- P-3A Orion – July 1976
- P-3B Orion – 1981
- P-3B TAC/NAV MOD Orion – January 1986

== See also ==
- Maritime patrol aircraft
- List of Lockheed P-3 Orion variants
- List of inactive United States Navy aircraft squadrons
- List of United States Navy aircraft squadrons
- List of squadrons in the Dictionary of American Naval Aviation Squadrons
- History of the United States Navy
