= VP-60 =

Patrol Squadron 60
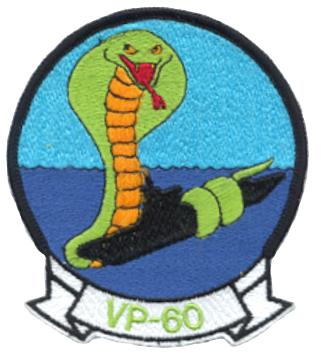
- VP-60 patch
- Active: 1 November 1970 – 1 September 1994
- Country: United States of America
- Branch: United States Navy Reserve
- Type: squadron
- Role: Maritime patrol
- Nickname: Cobras

Aircraft flown
- Patrol: SP-2H Neptune; P-3A/B Orion

VP-60 was a Patrol Squadron of the U.S. Navy Reserve, based at NAS Glenview, Illinois. Its nickname was the Cobras. The squadron was established on 1 November 1970, and disestablished on 1 September 1994.

== Operational history ==
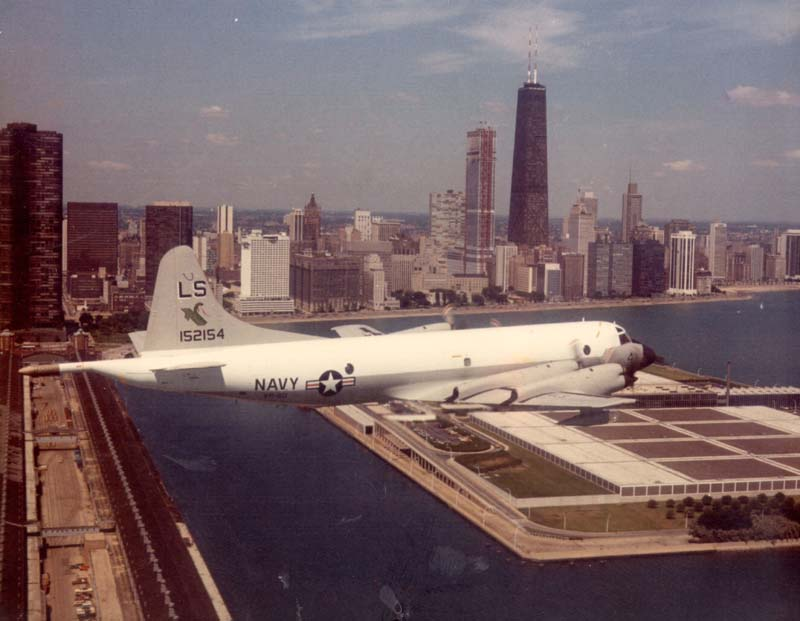
VP-60 P-3A over Chicago c.1975

- 1 November 1970: VP-60 was one of 12 VP and three VR squadrons established in 1970 as a continuation of a program initiated in July 1968 to give Naval Air Reserve squadrons an improved combat readiness. The concept, known as the 12/2/1 had 12 VP squadrons under two commands, Commander Fleet Air Reserve Wings Atlantic and Commander Fleet Air Reserve Wings Pacific, both under the control of one central authority, Commander Naval Air Reserve. VP- 60 was established at NAS Glenview, Ill., under Commander Reserve Patrol Wings, Atlantic. It was formed by combining personnel from VPs 70V1, 70V2, 70V3 and 49V4, at Naval Air Station Glenview and NAS Twin Cities, Minnesota. The squadron conducted flying operations with twelve SP-2H Neptunes.
- 1 July 1975: Administrative control for VP-60 was transferred from Commander Reserve Patrol Wings, Atlantic to Commander Reserve Patrol Wings, Pacific.
- June–November 1980: VP-60 transitioned from the P-3A airframe to the P-3B. The B-model Orions came with more powerful engines and improved avionics. Transition training was completed in November.
- 27 March 1981: VP-60 deployed to NAF Kadena, Okinawa, with detachments at NAS Whidbey Island, Washington, and NAS Barbers Point, Hawaii. Crews operating with the two detachments completed basic and advanced Anti-submarine warfare (ASW) qualification flights in the weapons systems trainer. The unit at Kadena provided the only available on-the-spot sea-air rescue support in April when USS George Washington collided with a Japanese freighter that resulted in the sinking of the freighter.
- March 1983: The first of the squadron's 10 P-3B Orions was sent to the Naval Air Rework Facility (NARF) at NAS Alameda, California, for retrofit to the P-3B Tactical Navigational Modification (TAC/NAV MOD).
- 1993: In its last year of operational flying, VP-60 provided support to UNITAS XXXIV/93, a series of ASW exercises conducted with naval units in Uruguay.
- 17 August 1993: VP-60 was selected to conduct a live over-the-horizon HARM and Harpoon launch at NAS Point Mugu, California. The exercise was unique in that the crew launched their Harpoon using coordinated satellite targeting data delivered straight to the cockpit instead of the aircraft's onboard radar data.
- 1 September 1994: VP-60 was disestablished at NAS Glenview.

== Aircraft assignment ==
The squadron first received the following aircraft on the dates shown:

- SP-2H 1 November 1970
- P-3A 1974
- P-3B June 1980
- P-3B MOD March 1983

== See also ==
- Maritime patrol aircraft
- List of inactive United States Navy aircraft squadrons
- List of United States Navy aircraft squadrons
- List of squadrons in the Dictionary of American Naval Aviation Squadrons
- History of the United States Navy
