= VP-67 =

Patrol Squadron 67
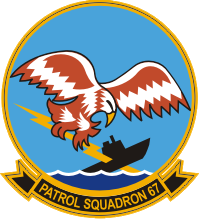
- VP-67 patch
- Active: 1 November 1970 – 30 September 1994
- Country: United States of America
- Branch: United States Navy Reserve
- Type: squadron
- Role: Maritime patrol
- Nickname(s): Golden Hawks/Thunder Chickens

Aircraft flown
- Patrol: SP-2H Neptune; P-3A/B Orion

VP-67 was a Patrol Squadron of the U.S. Navy Reserve. The squadron was established on 1 November 1970 at NAS Memphis, Tennessee, where it was based for its entire life. It was disestablished on 30 September 1994, after 24 years of service. The squadron's nickname was the Golden Hawks, also unofficially called the Thunder Chickens. Elements of the squadron made 23 major overseas deployments.

== Operational history ==
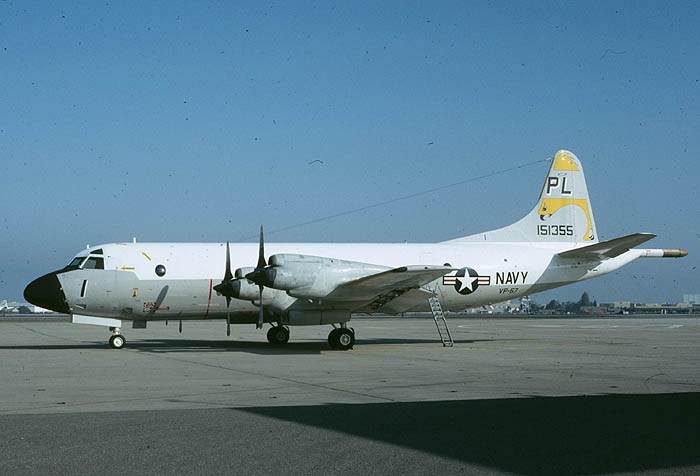
VP-67 P-3A in November 1982

- 1 November 1970: VP-67 was established at NAS Memphis, as a land-based patrol squadron flying the SP-2H Neptune. The squadron was formed in 1970 from the assets of VP-17M1, VP-60M2, and VP- 68M3, which had been based at NAS Olathe, Kansas, and NAS Memphis. The new squadron came under the operational and administrative control of the Commander, Naval Air Reserve Forces, Pacific and Commander, Fleet Air Reserve Wings, Pacific. VP-66 was established as a result of a major reorganization of Naval Air Reserves that took place in 1970. Under the Reserve Force Squadron concept 12 land-based Naval Reserve patrol squadrons were formed and structured along the lines of regular Navy squadrons with nearly identical organization and manning levels. The reorganization plan was known as the 12/2/1 concept. There were 12 VP squadrons assigned to two major commands, COMFAIRESWINGLANT and COMFAIRESWINGPAC. These two major commands came under the control of one central authority, Commander Naval Air Reserve.
- August 1973: VP-67 deployed to NAS Barber's Point, Hawaii for two weeks operational training.
- July 1974: VP-67 deployed to Naval Air Reserve Unit (NARU), Point Mugu, California, for two weeks of intensive ground and air training in SP-2H operation and maintenance.
- September 1975: The squadron sent a detachment of three SP-2H aircraft to Venezuela to participate in operation HALCON VISTA with elements of the Venezuela Armed Forces.
- 20 October – 2 November 1975: The squadron deployed to NAS Roosevelt Roads, Puerto Rico for active duty operational training.
- 1976: Active duty training was performed by the squadron at NARU Memphis, Tenn., with detachments at NAS Bermuda and NAS Key West, Florida.
- July 1977: The squadron's SP-2H aircraft were turned in for new P-3A Orion replacements. While transition training on the P-3A was taking place, VP-67 was tasked with providing transition training to Argentine Navy pilots whose squadrons were receiving the SP-2H. Transition training for all of the squadron's aircrews was completed by July 1979.
- 16 July – 15 August 1979: Upon completion of transition to the P-3A, VP-67 deployed for its ADT to NAS Whidbey Island, Washington; NAS Moffett Field, California; and NAS Barbers Point, Hawaii.
- May 1980: VP-67 deployed for the first time in the P-3A Orion to Kadena AFB, Okinawa. Numerous Anti-submarine warfare (ASW) exercises were conducted in conjunction with elements of the 7th Fleet, regular Navy patrol squadrons, and the Japanese Maritime Self-Defense Force. On 15 May 1980, the squadron completed 25,000 accident-free flight hours.
- 6 June – 5 July 1981: VP-67 deployed in the P-3A Orion to NAS Cubi Point, PI and integrated into Task Force 72 in support of CTF 72 operational commitments. The squadron smoothly executed a demanding schedule of operational missions, augmentation flights, refugee operations, CAST and ready alert duties. Its outstanding performance resulted in highly complementary "WELL DONES" from CTF 72, ComPatWingsPAC and ComResPatWingsPAC. qa
- 29 May – 27 June 1982: The squadron deployed from NAS Memphis to NAS Cubi Point, PI. Numerous ASM exercises were conducted in conjunction with elements of the 7th Fleet, active duty Navy patrol squadrons and the Japanese Maritime Self-Defense Force.
- 22 January 1990: The squadron's official complement of aircraft was changed from nine P-3B MOD aircraft to eight aircraft.
- 1992: VP-67 conducted split deployments during 1992, with a three crew detachment to Naval Air Facility Adak, Alaska, 26 February to 26 March; a two crew detachment to Goose Bay, Newfoundland, 13 to 21 August; and a three crew detachment to NAS Adak, Alaska, 24 April to 26 May. Despite the difficulties in conducting deployments at such a variety of sites, the squadron never missed a sortie due to maintenance or bad weather.
- 30 September 1994: VP-67 was disestablished at NAS Memphis.

== Aircraft assignment ==
The squadron first received the following aircraft on the dates shown:

- SP-2H Neptune – November 1970
- P-3A Orion – July 1977
- P-3B TAC/NAV MOD Orion – March 1985

== See also ==
- Maritime patrol aircraft
- List of Lockheed P-3 Orion variants
- List of inactive United States Navy aircraft squadrons
- List of United States Navy aircraft squadrons
- List of squadrons in the Dictionary of American Naval Aviation Squadrons
- History of the United States Navy
