= VP-90 =

Patrol Squadron 90
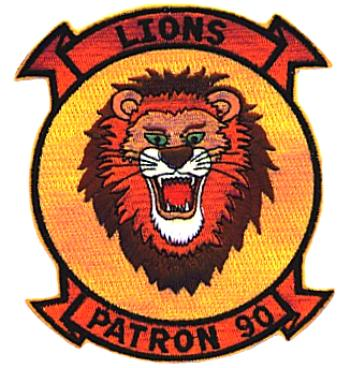
- VP-90 patch
- Active: 1 November 1970 – 30 September 1994
- Country: United States of America
- Branch: United States Navy Reserve
- Type: squadron
- Role: Maritime patrol
- Nickname(s): Lions

Aircraft flown
- Patrol: SP-2H Neptune; P-3A/B Orion

VP-90 was a Patrol Squadron of the U.S. Navy Reserve. The squadron was established on 1 November 1970 at NAS Glenview, Illinois, where it was based for the rest of its life. It was disestablished on 30 September 1994, after 25 years of service. The squadron's nickname was the Lions from 1974 onward. Elements of the squadron made 22 major overseas deployments.

== Operational history ==
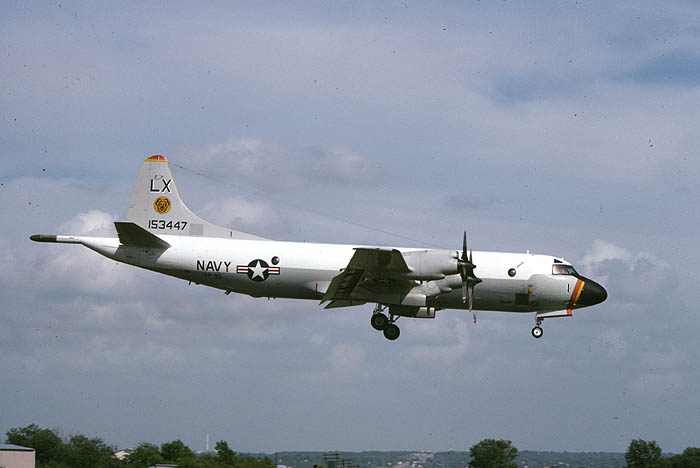
VP-90 P-3B landing at NAS Dallas

- 1 Nov 1970: VP-90 was established at NAS Glenview, as a Naval Air Reserve land-based patrol squadron flying 12 SP-2H Neptunes. The new squadron came under the operational and administrative control of Commander, Naval Air Reserve Forces, Atlantic, and Commander, Fleet Air Reserve Wings, Atlantic. VP-90 was established as a result of a major reorganization of the Naval Air Reserve that took place in mid-1970. Under the Reserve Force Squadron concept 12 land-based naval reserve patrol squadrons were formed and structured along the lines of regular Navy squadrons with nearly identical organization and manning levels. The 12/2/1 concept had 12 VP squadrons under two commands, COMFAIRESWINGLANT and COMFAIRESWINGPAC. These two commands came under the control of one central authority, Commander Naval Air Reserve.
- 1 July 1975: VP-90 was transferred from the administrative and operational control of Commander Reserve Patrol Wing Atlantic to Commander Reserve Patrol Wing Pacific, based at NAS Moffett Field, California.
- May 1981: While on a WestPac ADT deployment, VP-90 participated in the successful rescue of 55 Vietnamese boat people in the South China Sea. Crews involved received the Humanitarian Service Medal from the Secretary of the Navy for this service.
- 30 September 1994: VP-90 was disestablished at NAS Glenview, Illinois.

== Aircraft assignment ==
The squadron first received the following aircraft on the dates shown:

- SP-2H Neptune – November 1970
- P-3A Orion – March 1974
- P-3B MOD Orion – July 1984

== See also ==
- Maritime patrol aircraft
- List of Lockheed P-3 Orion variants
- List of inactive United States Navy aircraft squadrons
- List of United States Navy aircraft squadrons
- List of squadrons in the Dictionary of American Naval Aviation Squadrons
- History of the United States Navy
