= VA-873 (U.S. Navy) =

Attack Squadron 873
- Active: 1964-1968
- Country: United States
- Branch: United States Navy Reserve
- Type: Attack squadron
- Home port: Naval Air Station Alameda
- Colors: White; Blue

Commanders
- Commander: Glen W. Stinnett, Jr.

Aircraft flown
- Attack: A-4B Skyhawk; A-4C Skyhawk

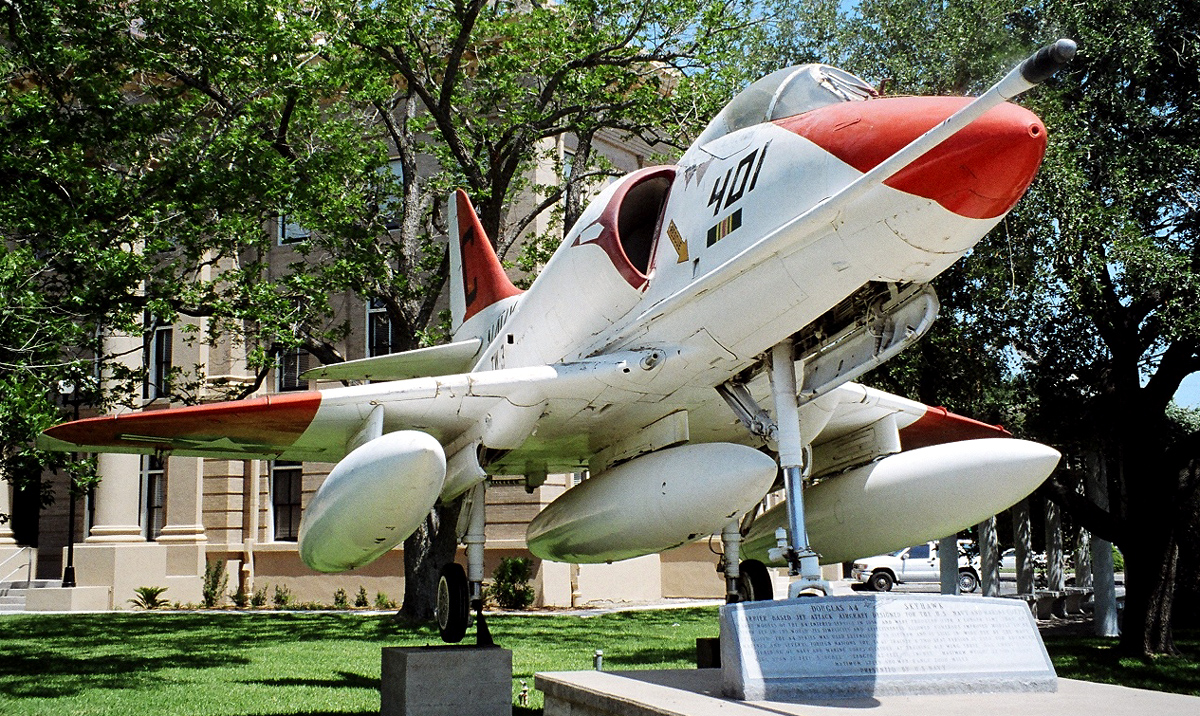
A-4B Skyhawk similar to those flown by VA-873.

VA-873 was an attack squadron of the U.S. Navy Reserve, based at Naval Air Station Alameda, California. Its insignia was approved by CNO on 16 March 1964. Colors for the insignia were: a white and blue background outlined in black; the blue background section had five white stars and the white section had a gold outline of San Francisco Golden Gate with two blue rows of waves beneath the bridge; separating the two sections was a stylized aircraft in black with a red flame coming from the tail; the scroll was white outlined in black with black lettering.

Other details of its early years are sketchy, as few records exist for reserve squadrons prior to 1970, the year during which they began submitting history reports.

On 27 January 1968, The President directed the activation of VA-873 following the capture of USS Pueblo by a North Korean patrol boat four days earlier. The squadron was deactivated and returned to reserve status on 12 October 1968.

== Aircraft assignment ==
The squadron first received the following aircraft on the dates shown:

- A-4B Skyhawk – 27 January 1968
- A-4C Skyhawk – May 1968

== See also ==
- List of squadrons in the Dictionary of American Naval Aviation Squadrons
- Attack aircraft
- List of inactive United States Navy aircraft squadrons
- History of the United States Navy
