= VA-304 (U.S. Navy) =

Attack Squadron 304
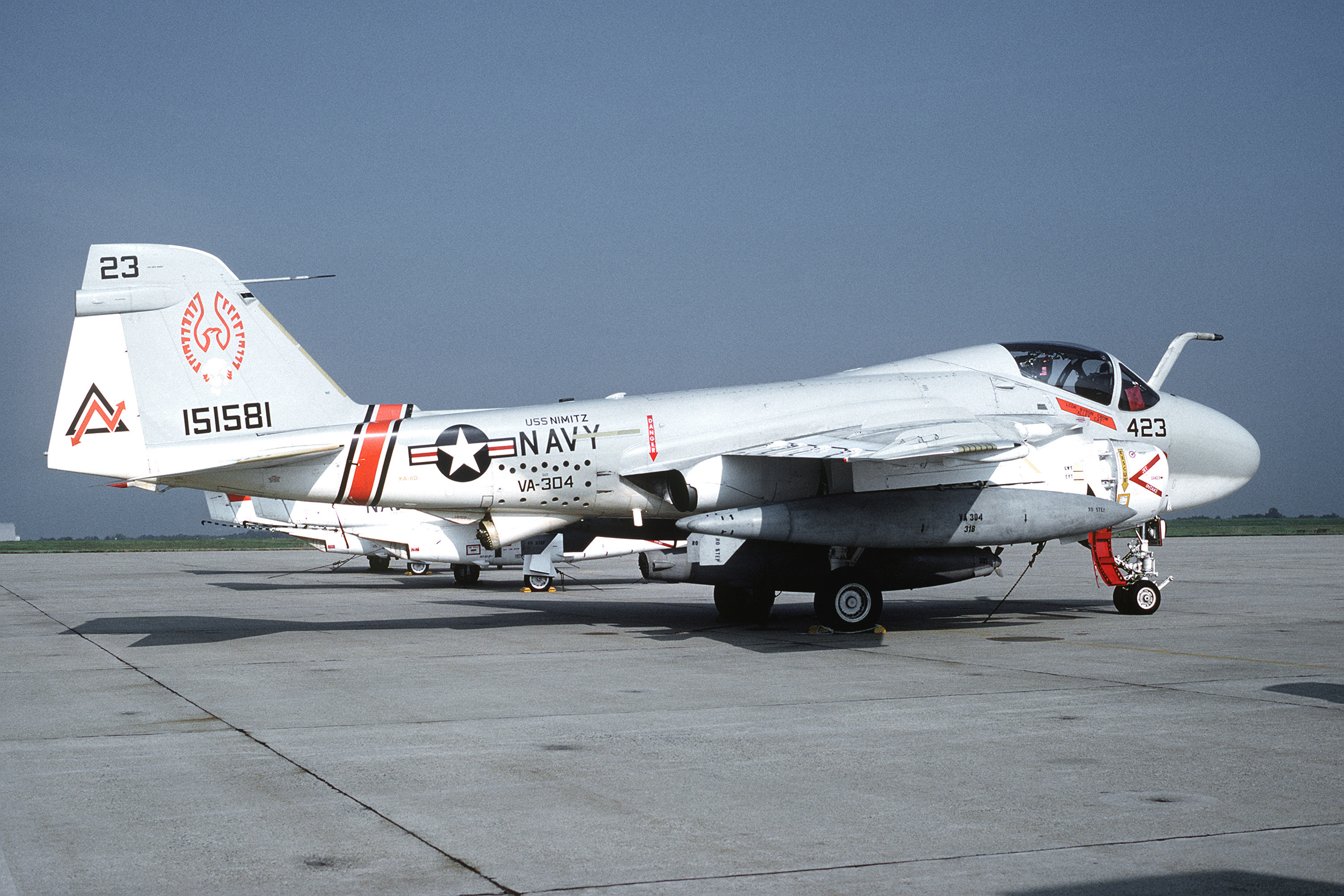
- VA-304 KA-6D Intruder at Naval Air Facility Andrews, 1990
- Active: 1 July 1970 - 31 December 1994
- Country: United States
- Branch: United States Navy Reserve
- Role: Attack aircraft
- Part of: Inactive
- Nickname(s): Firebirds

Aircraft flown
- Attack: A-4 Skyhawk; A-7 Corsair II; A-6E/KA-6D Intruder

VA-304, nicknamed the Firebirds, was an Attack Squadron of the U.S. Navy Reserve, based at NAS Alameda, California. It was established on 1 July 1970, and disestablished almost 25 years later, on 31 December 1994.

== Operational history ==
- 1 July 1970: VA-304, a reserve squadron, established as part of a reorganization intended to increase the combat readiness of the Naval Air Reserve Force. Elements of reserve unit, VA-20G3, were used to form the newly established VA-304.
- May 1987: VA-304 operated from the Canadian Forces Base Edmonton, Alberta, while participating in exercise Rendezvous 87-Bold Warrior. The exercise was a mock full-scale battle between elements of the Canadian Armed Forces with VA-304 acting as an aggressor force.
- August 1988: VA-304 was the first reserve squadron to receive and operate the A-6E Intruder.

== Aircraft assignment ==
The squadron first received the following aircraft on the dates shown:

- A-4C Skyhawk – Jul 1970
- A-7A Corsair II – 06 Aug 1971
- A-7B Corsair II – Sep 1977
- A-7E Corsair II – Sep 1986
- KA-6D Intruder – 22 Jul 1988
- A-6E Intruder – 05 Aug 1988

== See also ==
- List of squadrons in the Dictionary of American Naval Aviation Squadrons
- Attack aircraft
- List of inactive United States Navy aircraft squadrons
- History of the United States Navy
