= VA-175 (U.S. Navy) =

Attack Squadron 175
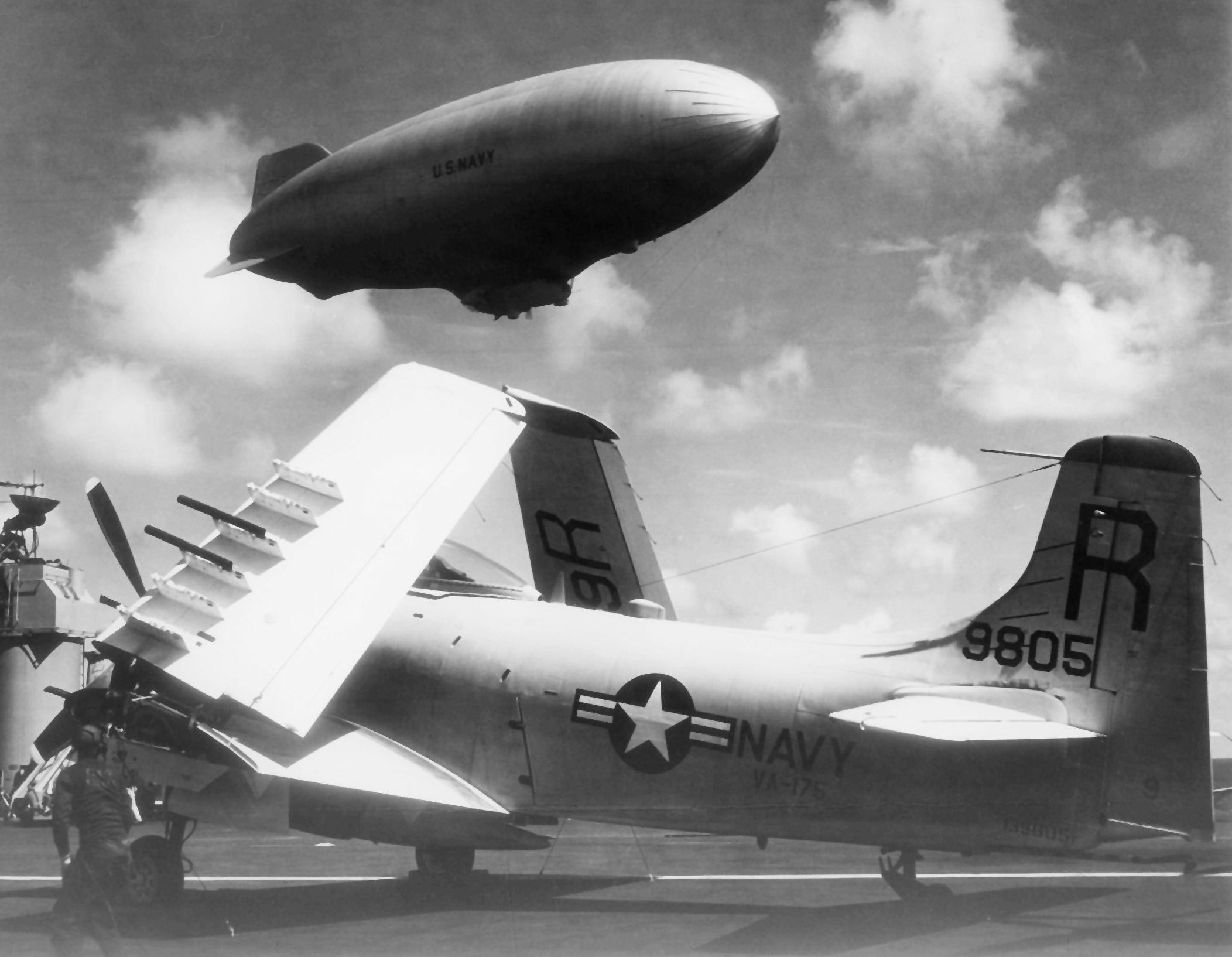
- VA-175 AD-6 Skyraider aboard USS Franklin D. Roosevelt at Guantanamo Bay Naval Base in 1956
- Active: 1 April 1944 – 15 March 1958
- Country: United States
- Branch: United States Navy
- Type: Attack
- Nickname(s): Devils' Diplomats
- Engagements: World War II

Aircraft flown
- Attack: TBM Avenger; AD Skyraider

VA-175, nicknamed the Devil's Diplomats, was an attack squadron of the United States Navy. It was established as Torpedo Squadron VT-82 on 1 April 1944, redesignated as VA-18A on 15 November 1946, and as VA-175 on 11 August 1948. The squadron was disestablished on 15 March 1958.

== Operational history ==
- 15 December 1944 – 7 January 1945: The squadron, embarked on USS Bennington, was in transit from Norfolk, Virginia, to the Hawaiian Islands, with a two-day stop over at San Diego.
- 16 February 1945: The squadron participated in its first combat operations, flying sorties against the air strip at Hachijo Jima and against airfields in the Tokyo area. The squadron's commanding officer, Lieutenant Commander E. D. DeGarmo, was awarded the Silver Star for his actions during the missions against the Japanese airfields.
- 20–22 February 1945: The squadron provided close air support for operations on Iwo Jima.
- 19 March 1945: Squadron aircraft participated in strikes against the Japanese Fleet, which included the battleship Yamato, located near Kure and Hiroshima in the Inland Sea.
- 7 April 1945: Squadron aircraft were the first to attack a powerful Japanese Task Force that had sortied from the Inland Sea and was operating west of Kyushu. This force included the Yamato and her escorts. The squadron achieved hits on two destroyers and one light cruiser, sinking one of the destroyers. Attacks from other task force aircraft resulted in the sinking of the Yamato, a cruiser and three other destroyers. Seven squadron pilots were awarded the Navy Cross for their actions during this engagement. They were: Lieutenant Commander Edward E. DeGarmo; Lieutenants Jesse W. Naul Jr. and Norman A. Wiese; and Lieutenant (jg)s John F. Gilbreath Jr., Wilfred O. McDowell, Donald B. Barber and Charles R. Walton.
- March–May 1945: The squadron was involved in preinvasion strikes on Okinawa and provided support for the Battle of Okinawa.
- 3 June 1945: Lieutenant Commander Edward E. DeGarmo was killed in action when he crash-landed his plane after his plane was struck by enemy anti-aircraft fire which engulfed the engine in flames.
- 17 June 1945: VT-82 completed its tour of combat duty and embarked on USS White Plains for its transit back to the United States, arriving at NAS Alameda on 9 July.
- November–December 1956: USS Franklin D. Roosevelt, with VA-175 embarked, was ordered to deploy and operate off the coast of Spain as a result of the Suez Canal Crisis.

== Home port assignments ==
The squadron was assigned to these home ports, effective on the dates shown:

- NAS Quonset Point – 1 Apr 1944
- NAAF New Bedford – 13 Apr 1944*
- NAAS Oceana – 16 Jun 1944*
- NAS Quonset Point – 13 Nov 1944*
- NAS Kahului – 8 Jan 1945*
- NAS Alameda – Jul 1945
- NAF Newport – Mar 1946
- NAS Quonset Point – Apr 1946
- NAAS Cecil Field – 11 Jan 1949
- NAS Jacksonville – 9 Jan 1950

* Temporary shore assignment while the squadron conducted training in preparation for combat deployment.

== Aircraft assignment ==
The squadron first received the following aircraft on the dates shown:

- TBM-1 Avenger – Apr 1944
- TBM-1C Avenger – Apr 1944
- TBM-3 Avenger – 6 Aug 1944
- TBM-3E Avenger – Sep 1945
- TBM-3Q Avenger – May 1946
- TBM-3J Avenger – Mar 1947
- AD-3 Skyraider – 16 Feb 1949
- AD-4 Skyraider – 4 Apr 1950
- AD-4L Skyraider – Feb 1951
- AD-4B Skyraider – Feb 1953
- AD-6 Skyraider – Aug 1954

== See also ==
- List of squadrons in the Dictionary of American Naval Aviation Squadrons
- Attack aircraft
- Torpedo bomber
- List of inactive United States Navy aircraft squadrons
- History of the United States Navy
