= VPB-200 =

Patrol Squadron
- Active: 1 April 1944 – 24 October 1945
- Country: United States of America
- Branch: United States Navy
- Type: squadron
- Role: Maritime patrol
- Engagements: World War II

Aircraft flown
- Patrol: PV-1; PB4Y-1; PB4Y-2; PV-2

VPB-200 was a Patrol Bombing Squadron of the U.S. Navy. The squadron was established as Bombing Squadron Two Hundred (VB-200) on 1 April 1944, redesignated Patrol Bombing Squadron Two Hundred (VPB-200) on 1 October 1944 and disestablished on 24 October 1945.

== Operational history ==
- 1 April 1944: VB-200 was established at NAS Kaneohe Bay, Hawaii, as a combat replacement unit providing instruction on multiengine patrol aircraft. The personnel and equipment for the new squadron were drawn from the HEDRON Multiengine Replacement Unit, FAW-2. The squadron's primary duties included training replacement crews, ferrying aircraft and stand-by offshore patrol for Anti-submarine warfare and rescue work. Sections of the squadron operated on Johnston and Midway Atolls for rescue duties. Training squadrons like VB-200 trained fresh crews arriving from the U.S. in their final phases of combat training before being sent into the combat zone. VB-200 trained crews in land-based aircraft such as the PB4Y-1 Liberator, PB4Y-2 Privateer and PV-1 Ventura.
- October 1944: The training squadrons at NAS Kaneohe initially worked with intact squadrons destined for combat deployments. In October 1944 the policy was changed to keep squadrons in the operational areas while sending in new crews to replace combat losses and crews due for rotation based on time-in-theater points.
- May 1945: VPB-200 conducted experiments for the Bureau of Aeronautics in picking up mail with hooks from surface vessels towing kites and balloons. Several successful trials were conducted but the method did not become a standard operating procedure throughout the fleet.
- 24 Oct 1945: VPB-200 was disestablished at NAS Kaneohe, Hawaii.

== Aircraft assignments ==
The squadron was assigned the following aircraft, effective on the dates shown:

- PV-1 April 1944
- PB4Y-1 April 1944
- PB4Y-2 August 1944
- PV-2 January 1945

== See also ==
- Maritime patrol aircraft
- List of inactive United States Navy aircraft squadrons
- List of United States Navy aircraft squadrons
- List of squadrons in the Dictionary of American Naval Aviation Squadrons
- History of the United States Navy
