= VP-1 (1921–1922) =

Patrol Squadron 1
- Active: 1921 - July 1922
- Country: United States of America
- Branch: United States Navy
- Type: squadron
- Role: Maritime patrol

Aircraft flown
- Patrol: F5L; N-9

VP-1 was a Patrol Squadron of the U.S. Navy. The squadron was established as Seaplane Patrol Squadron ONE (VP-1) in late 1921 and was disestablished circa July 1922.

== Operational history ==
- 16 January 1922: VP-1 started the annual bombing exercises with eight officers and five Naval Aviation Pilots (NAPS, enlisted pilots). The squadron was supported by seaplane tenders USS Aroostook and USS Gannet. The squadron also conducted mail flights between San Diego, and the fleet at San Pedro, California.
- 20 January 1922: Squadron aircraft flew Rear Admiral John K. Robison, Chief of the Bureau of Engineering, to San Pedro for a visit to the fleet.
- 23 January – 3 February 1922: Squadron aircraft were assigned the responsibility for torpedo recovery for Submarine Division 9.
- 13 February 1922: VP-1 aircraft operated with USS California photographing gunfire.
- 6 July 1922: Squadron aircraft rescued five fishermen whose boat had caught fire and sunk off the coast of San Diego.
- July 1922: VP-1 was disestablished at NAS San Diego. Personnel and equipment were used to form the nucleus of Torpedo and Bombing Plane Squadron 2 (VT-2).

== Aircraft assignments ==
The squadron was assigned the following aircraft, effective on the dates shown:

- F5L - late 1921
- N-9 - April 1922

== Home port assignments ==
The squadron was assigned to these home ports, effective on the dates shown:

- NAS San Diego, California - late 1921

== See also ==
- Maritime patrol aircraft
- List of inactive United States Navy aircraft squadrons
- List of United States Navy aircraft squadrons
- List of squadrons in the Dictionary of American Naval Aviation Squadrons
- History of the United States Navy
