= VA-214 (U.S. Navy) =

Attack Squadron 214
- Active: 15 September 1948 – 16 May 1949
- Country: United States
- Branch: United States Navy
- Type: Attack

Aircraft flown
- Attack: TBM-3E Avenger

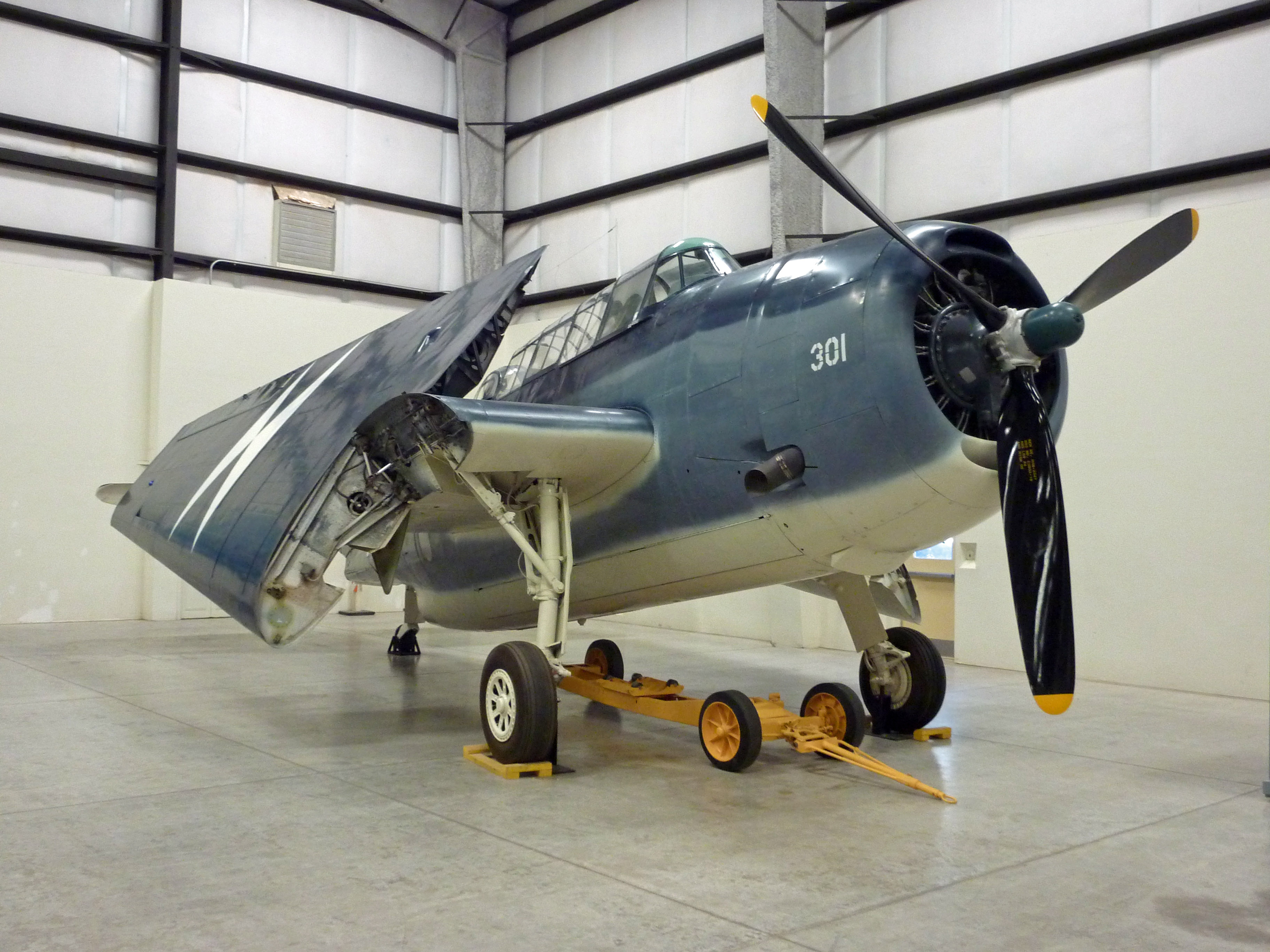
TBM-3 Avenger at the Pima Air & Space Museum. VA-214 operated similar aircraft

VA-214 was a short-lived Attack Squadron of the United States Navy. It was established on 15 September 1948 at Naval Air Station Seattle, Washington, and disestablished eight months later, on 16 May 1949. Its insignia and nickname are unknown.

The squadron was established with the mission of being an all-weather attack unit and part of a carrier air group that was to be all-weather capable. Squadron personnel attended instrument training at the Fleet All-Weather Training Unit, Pacific. It flew the TBM-3E Avenger.

A second VA-214 was established as Fighter Squadron VF-214 on 30 March 1955, redesignated as VA-214 on 11 October 1956 and disestablished on 1 August 1958.

== See also ==
- List of squadrons in the Dictionary of American Naval Aviation Squadrons
- Attack aircraft
- List of inactive United States Navy aircraft squadrons
- History of the United States Navy
