= USS Cumberland Sound =

Tender of the United States Navy

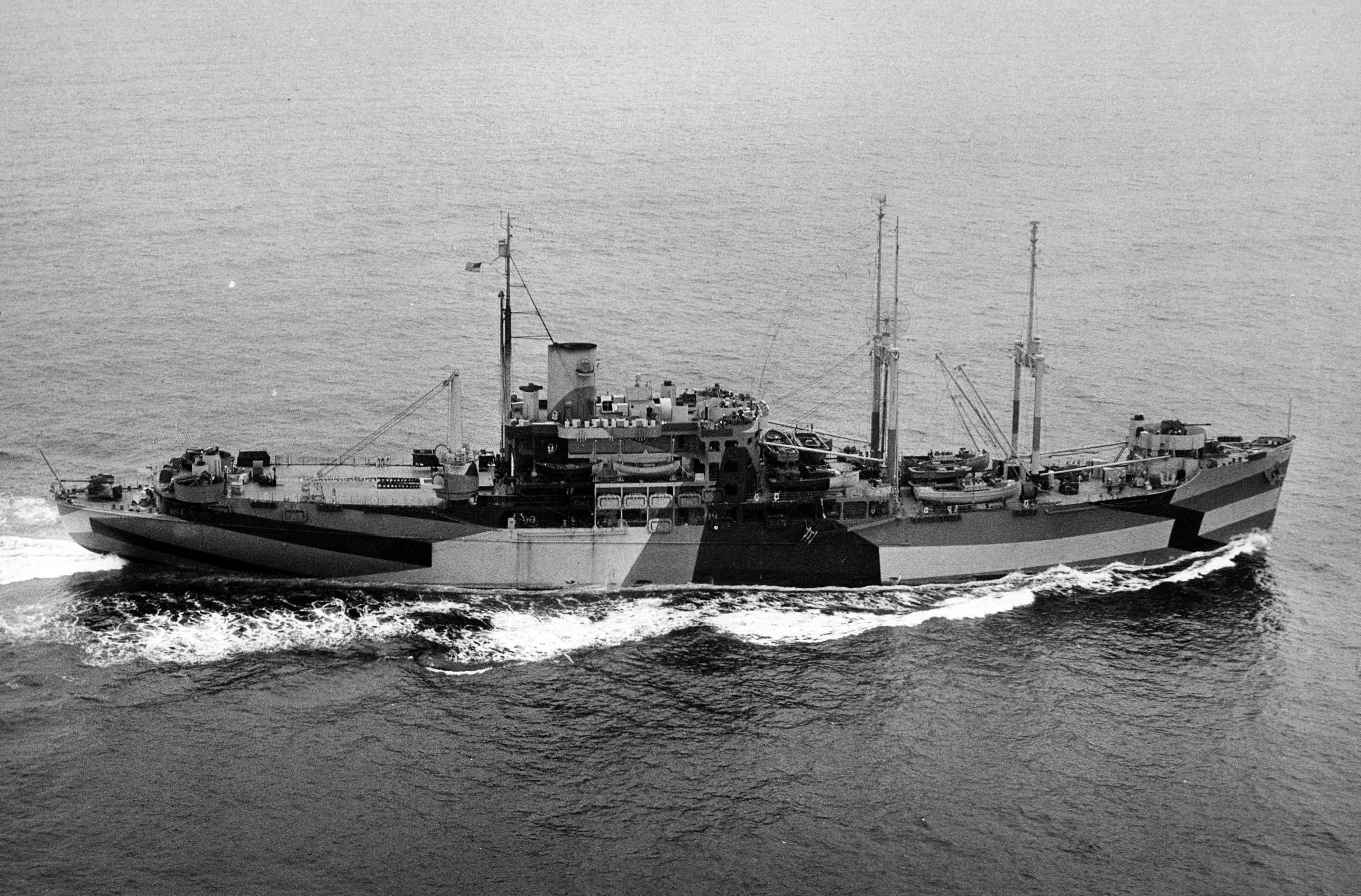
- USS Cumberland Sound

History

United States
- Name: USS Cumberland Sound
- Namesake: Cumberland Sound in Georgia
- Builder: Todd-Pacific Shipyards, Inc., Tacoma, Washington
- Launched: 23 February 1944
- Commissioned: 21 August 1944
- Decommissioned: 27 May 1947
- Stricken: 1 July 1961
- Fate: Sold, 23 April 1962

General characteristics
- Class & type: Kenneth Whiting-class seaplane tender
- Displacement: 8,510 long tons (8,647 t) light; 12,610 long tons (12,812 t) full
- Length: 492 ft (150 m)
- Beam: 69 ft 6 in (21.18 m)
- Draft: 23 ft 9 in (7.24 m)
- Propulsion: Steam turbine, 2 boilers, 1 shaft, 8,500 hp (6,338 kW)
- Speed: 19 knots (35 km/h; 22 mph)
- Complement: 1,077
- Armament: 2 × 5"/38 caliber guns; 2 × quad 40 mm AA gun mounts; 2 × dual 40 mm AA gun mounts; 16 × single 20 mm AA gun mounts

USS Cumberland Sound (AV-17) was a Kenneth Whiting-class seaplane tender in the United States Navy.

Cumberland Sound was launched 23 February 1944 by the Todd-Pacific Shipyards, Inc., Tacoma, Washington; sponsored by Mrs. O. A. Tucker; and commissioned 21 August 1944.

== Service history ==
Cumberland Sound was underway on 28 October 1944, bound for Pearl Harbor carrying six planes, passengers, and cargo. After training in the Hawaiian Islands, she sailed for Eniwetok on 1 December. From 13 December 1944 to 1 January 1945 she completed her training at Eniwetok, then loaded spare parts at Guam and arrived at Ulithi 12 January. She operated search patrols from this base until 24 June, then returned to Eniwetok, where until 7 August she tended the seaplanes of Patrol Bomber Squadron 22. Cumberland Sound rendezvoused with elements of the 3rd Fleet at Okinawa 18 August and sailed to Tokyo Bay, arriving 28 August to set up a seadrome. She remained on occupation duty, conducting search operations and special flights until 24 November when she headed for the United States.

Following a conversion to make it possible for her to accommodate troops, she departed Seattle, Washington 28 December 1945 and embarked returning servicemen at Pearl Harbor, landing them at San Pedro, California, 12 January 1946. Assigned to the Operation "Crossroads" nuclear weapon tests, on 19 January, Cumberland Sound entered the Long Beach Naval Shipyard for conversion to a laboratory ship. She served during the atomic tests at Eniwetok until 12 September 1946 when she returned to San Diego, California. She was placed out of commission in reserve 27 May 1947.
