= VA-22A (U.S. Navy) =

Attack Squadron 22A
- Active: 28 August 1944 – 5 August 1947
- Country: United States
- Branch: United States Navy
- Type: Attack
- Motto(s): Parati in Pace Aut Bello

Aircraft flown
- Attack: TBF/M Avenger

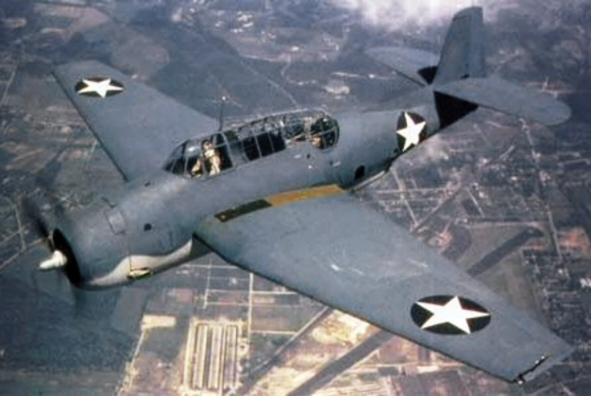
A TBF Avenger, similar to the aircraft flown by VA-22A

VA-22A was an Attack Squadron of the United States Navy, established as Torpedo Squadron VT-98 on 28 August 1944 at NAAS Ventura (Oxnard). It moved to NAAS Los Alamitos on 1 December 1944, and to NAS San Diego on 25 August 1946. The squadron was redesignated VA-22A on 15 November 1946. It was disestablished on 5 August 1947.

The squadron's motto was Parati—in Pace—Aut Bello (Prepared—in Peace—or War). It flew various models of the Grumman TBF Avenger, and its mission throughout its life was to provide trained torpedo plane pilots and aircrewmen for assignment as replacements to squadrons operating in the Pacific.

== See also ==
- Attack aircraft
- History of the United States Navy
- List of inactive United States Navy aircraft squadrons
