= VA-21A (U.S. Navy) =

Attack Squadron 21A
- Active: 28 August 1944 – 5 August 1947
- Country: United States
- Branch: United States Navy
- Type: Attack

Aircraft flown
- Attack: SB2C Helldiver; SBD Dauntless; FM-2 Wildcat

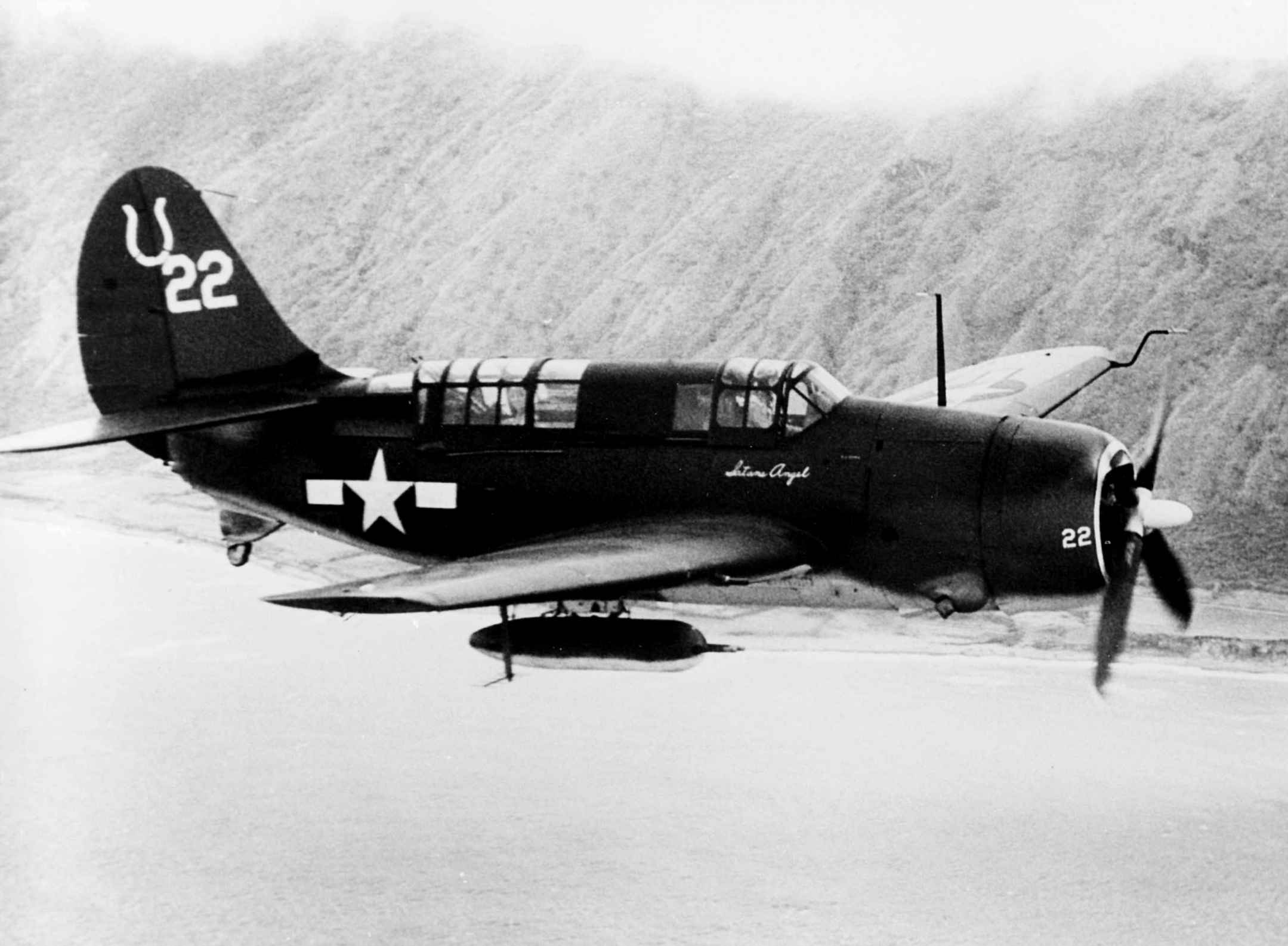
An SB2-C3 Helldiver similar to those flown by VA-21A

VA-21A was an Attack Squadron of the United States Navy during World War II. It was established as Bombing Squadron VB-98 on 28 August 1944 and redesignated as VA-21A on 15 November 1946. The squadron was disestablished on 5 August 1947.

The squadron's mission was to provide a pool of trained dive-bomber pilots and aircrewmen for assignment as replacements to squadrons operating in the Pacific. The training practiced in the squadron included carrier landing qualifications, gunnery, bombing and night flying.

== Aircraft assignment ==
The squadron was assigned the following aircraft in the months shown:

- SB2C-3 – Sep 1944
- SBD-6 – Sep 1944
- SB2C-4 – Oct 1944
- FM-2 – Oct 1944
- SBD-5 – Nov 1944
- SBW-3 – Dec 1944
- SBW-4E – Mar 1945
- SB2C-5 – Apr 1945

== See also ==
- Attack aircraft
- History of the United States Navy
- List of inactive United States Navy aircraft squadrons
