= Second VA-214 (U.S. Navy) =

Attack Squadron 214
- Active: 30 March 1955 – 1 August 1958
- Country: United States
- Branch: United States Navy
- Nickname(s): Volunteers

Aircraft flown
- Attack: FJ-3 Fury; F9F-8 Cougar; FJ-4B Fury

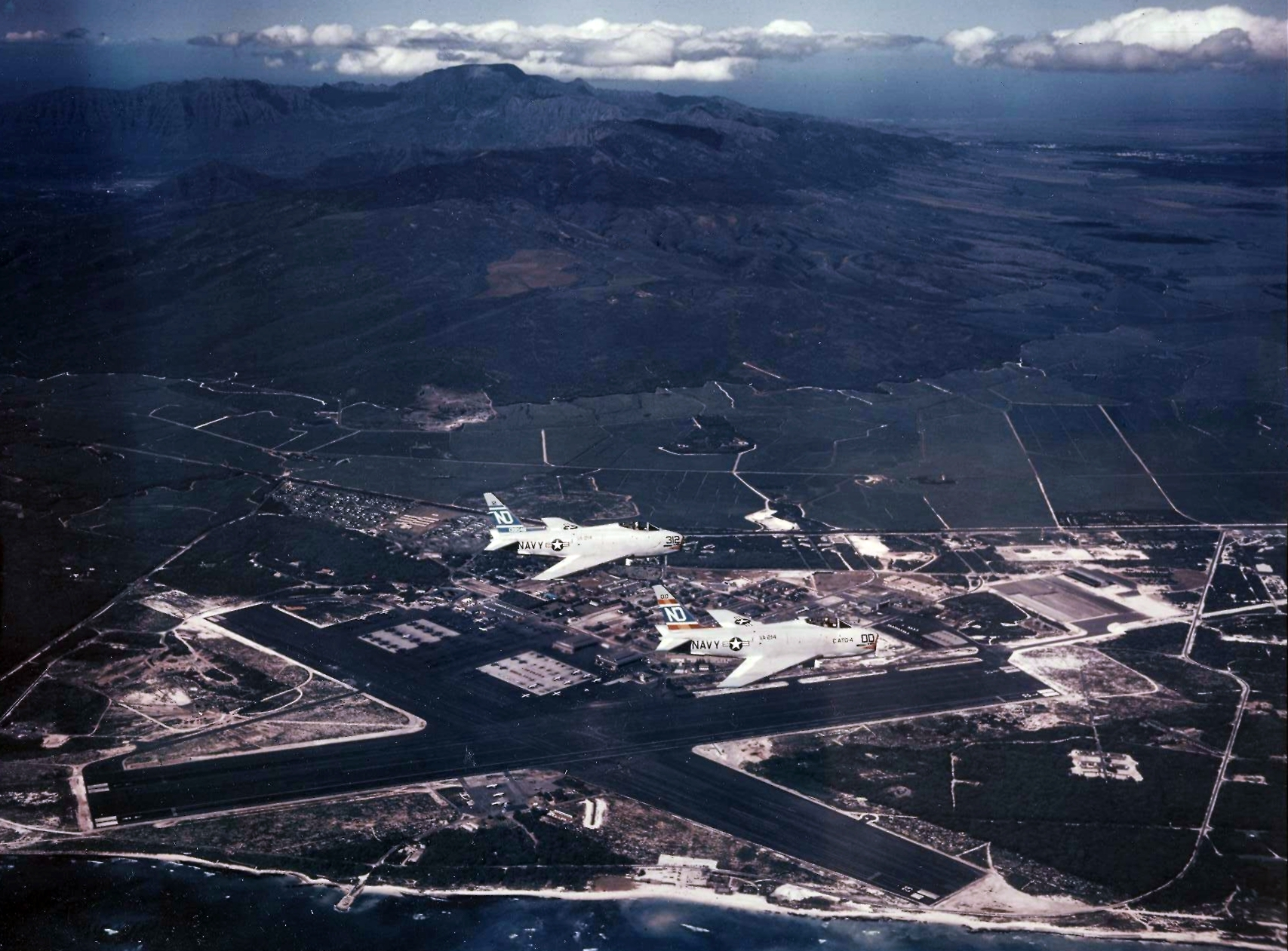
Two VA-214 FJ-4Bs over Naval Air Station Barbers Point, Hawaii, 1958.

VA-214, nicknamed the Volunteers, was a short-lived attack squadron of the United States Navy. It was the second squadron to bear the VA-214 designation, the first VA-214 was disestablished on 16 May 1949.

The squadron was established as Fighter Squadron VF-214 on 30 March 1955, and redesignated as VA-214 on 11 October 1956. The squadron, based at NAS Moffett Field, California, was the first West Coast squadron to make an extended deployment to WESTPAC with the new FJ-4B Fury. It was disestablished on 1 August 1958.

== Aircraft assignment ==
The squadron first received the following aircraft on the dates shown:

- FJ-3 Fury – 31 Mar 1955
- F9F-8 Cougar – Nov 1955
- FJ-4B Fury – 18 Jun 1957

== See also ==
- Attack aircraft
- List of inactive United States Navy aircraft squadrons
- History of the United States Navy
