= Lockheed C-5 Galaxy =

American heavy military transport aircraft

C-5 Galaxy
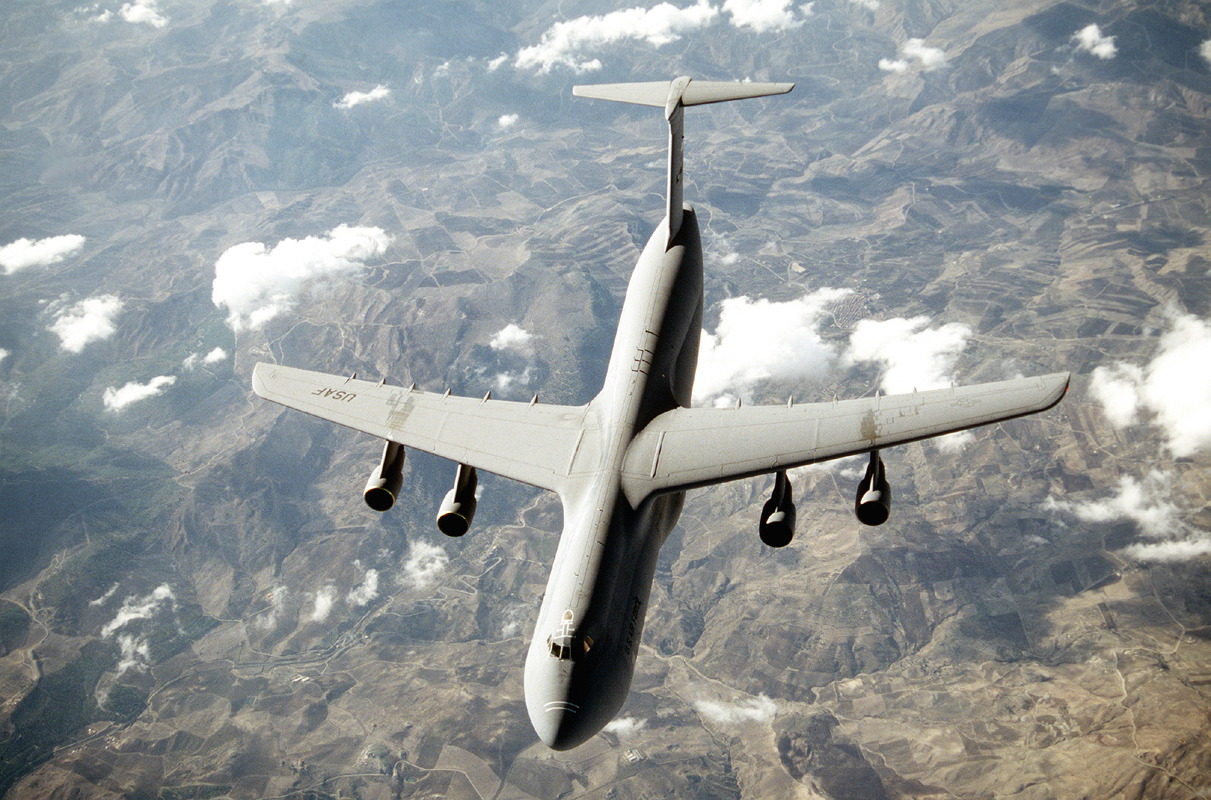
- A United States Air Force C-5 in flight

General information
- Type: Strategic airlifter
- National origin: United States
- Manufacturer: Lockheed Corporation; Lockheed Martin
- Status: In service
- Primary user: United States Air Force
- Number built: 131: C-5A: 81; C-5B: 50

History
- Manufactured: C-5A: 1968–1973; C-5B: 1985–1989
- Introduction date: June 1970; 56 years ago
- First flight: 30 June 1968; 58 years ago

The Lockheed C-5 Galaxy is a large four-engine military transport aircraft designed and built by Lockheed Corporation, and now maintained and upgraded by its successor, Lockheed Martin. It provides the United States Air Force (USAF) with a heavy intercontinental-range strategic airlift capability, one that can carry outsized and oversized loads, including all air-certifiable cargo. The Galaxy has many similarities to the smaller Lockheed C-141 Starlifter and the later Boeing C-17 Globemaster III. The C-5 is among the largest military aircraft in the world. All 52 in-service aircraft have been upgraded to the C-5M Super Galaxy with new engines and modernized avionics designed to extend its service life to 2040 and beyond.

The C-5 Galaxy's development was complicated, including significant cost overruns, and Lockheed suffered significant financial difficulties. Shortly after entering service, cracks in the wings of many aircraft were discovered and the C-5 fleet's use was restricted until corrective work was completed.

The USAF has been operating the C-5 since 1969. In that time, the airlifter supported US military operations in all major conflicts including Vietnam, Iraq, Yugoslavia, and Afghanistan, as well as allied support, such as Israel during the Yom Kippur War and operations in the Gulf War. The Galaxy has also distributed humanitarian aid, provided disaster relief, and supported the US space program.

== Development ==
=== CX-4 and Heavy Logistics System ===
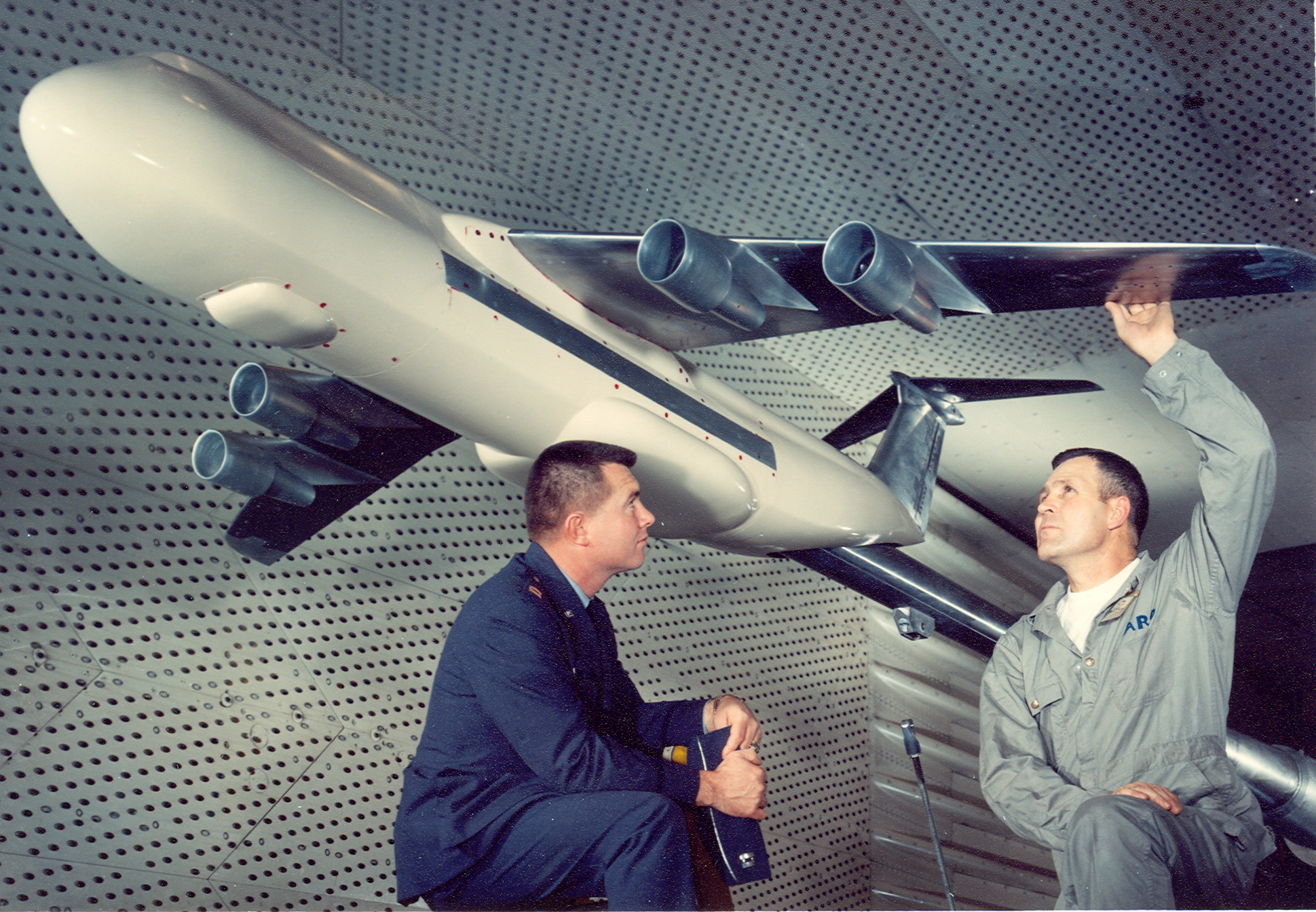
One of the first C-5A models is given a final inspection before testing in the Arnold Engineering Development Complex 16-foot transonic wind tunnel at Arnold Air Force Base in the mid-1960s.

In 1961, several aircraft companies began studying heavy jet transport designs that would replace the Douglas C-133 Cargomaster and the complement Lockheed C-141 Starlifters. In addition to higher overall performance, the United States Army wanted a transport aircraft with a larger cargo bay than the C-141, whose interior was too small to carry a variety of their outsized equipment. This led to the CX-4 requirement of July 1962, for which Lockheed, Boeing, Convair, and Douglas proposed six-engined designs. But when the US Army judged the CX-4 specification inadequate for its requirements in 1963, the proposed six-engined design was rejected because it was not viewed as a significant advance over the C-141. By late 1963, the next conceptual design was named CX-X for the specification that gave the way to the CX-HLC requirement specified and featured four engines. It was equipped with a gross weight of 550,000 pounds (249,000 kg), a maximum payload of 180,000 lb (81,600 kg), and a speed of Mach 0.75 (500 mph or 805 km/h). The cargo compartment was 17.2 ft (5.24 m) wide by 13.5 feet (4.11 m) high and 100 ft (30.5 m) long with front and rear access doors. USAF studies showed that high-bypass turbofan engines were needed for thrust and fuel efficiency requirements.

We started to build the C-5 and wanted to build the biggest thing we could … Quite frankly, the C-5 program was a great contribution to commercial aviation. We'll never get credit for it, but we incentivized that industry by developing [the TF39] engine.

— General Duane H. Cassidy, former MAC Commander in Chief

The criteria were finalized and an official request for proposal was issued in April 1964 for the "Heavy Logistics System" (CX-HLS) (previously CX-HLC, "Heavy Logistics Capability"). In May 1964, proposals for aircraft were received from Boeing, Douglas, General Dynamics, Lockheed, and Martin Marietta. General Electric, Curtiss-Wright, and Pratt & Whitney submitted proposals for the engines. After a downselect, Boeing, Douglas, and Lockheed were given one-year study contracts for the airframe, along with General Electric and Pratt & Whitney for the engines. All three of the designs shared a number of features. The cockpit was placed well above the cargo area to allow for cargo loading through a nose door. The Boeing and Douglas designs used a pod on the top of the fuselage containing the cockpit, while the Lockheed design extended the cockpit profile down the length of the fuselage, giving it an egg-shaped cross section. All of the designs had swept wings, as well as front and rear cargo doors, allowing simultaneous loading and unloading. Lockheed's design featured a T-tail, while the designs by Boeing and Douglas had conventional tails.

The United States Air Force considered Boeing's design to be better than that of Lockheed, but Lockheed's proposal was the lowest total-cost bid. Lockheed was selected as the winner in September 1965, then awarded a contract in December 1965. General Electric's TF39 engine was selected in August 1965 to power the new transport plane. At the time, GE's engine concept was revolutionary, as all engines before had a bypass ratio less than two-to-one, while the TF39 promised and would achieve a ratio of eight-to-one, which had the benefits of increased engine thrust and lower fuel consumption. Boeing lost the military contract, but went on to develop the CX-HLS concepts like the nose door and raised pod cockpit its proposal into the successful civilian Boeing 747, the world's first wide-body airliner, with 1,574 aircraft built when manufacturing ended in 2022 after 54 years of production.

=== Into production ===
The first C-5A Galaxy (serial number 66-8303) was rolled out of the manufacturing plant in Marietta, Georgia, on 2 March 1968. On 30 June 1968, flight testing of the C-5A began with the first flight, flown by Leo Sullivan, with the call sign "eight-three-oh-three heavy". Flight tests revealed that the aircraft exhibited a higher drag divergence Mach number than predicted by wind tunnel data. The maximum lift coefficient measured in flight with the flaps deflected 40° was higher than predicted (2.60 vs. 2.38), but was lower than predicted with the flaps deflected 25° (2.31 vs. 2.38) and with the flaps retracted (1.45 vs. 1.52).

After being one of the worst-run programs, ever, in its early years, it has evolved very slowly and with great difficulty into a nearly adequate strategic airlifter that unfortunately needs in-flight refueling or a ground stop for even the most routine long-distance flights. We spent a lot of money to make it capable of operating from unfinished airstrips near the front lines, when we never needed that capability or had any intention to use it.

— Robert F. Dorr, aviation historian

The aircraft weight was closely controlled during design and development. At the time of the first flight, the weight was below the guaranteed weight, but by the time of the delivery of the 9th aircraft, had exceeded guarantees. In July 1969, during a fuselage upbending test, the wing failed at 128% of limit load, which is below the requirement that it sustain 150% of limit load. Changes were made to the wing, but during a test in July 1970, it failed at 125% of limit load. A passive load-reduction system, involving uprigged ailerons, was incorporated, but the maximum allowable payload was reduced from 220,000 to 190,000 lb (100,000 to 86,000 kg). At the time it was predicted, with a 90% probability, that no more than 10% of the fleet of 79 airframes would reach their fatigue life of 19,000 hours without cracking of the wing.

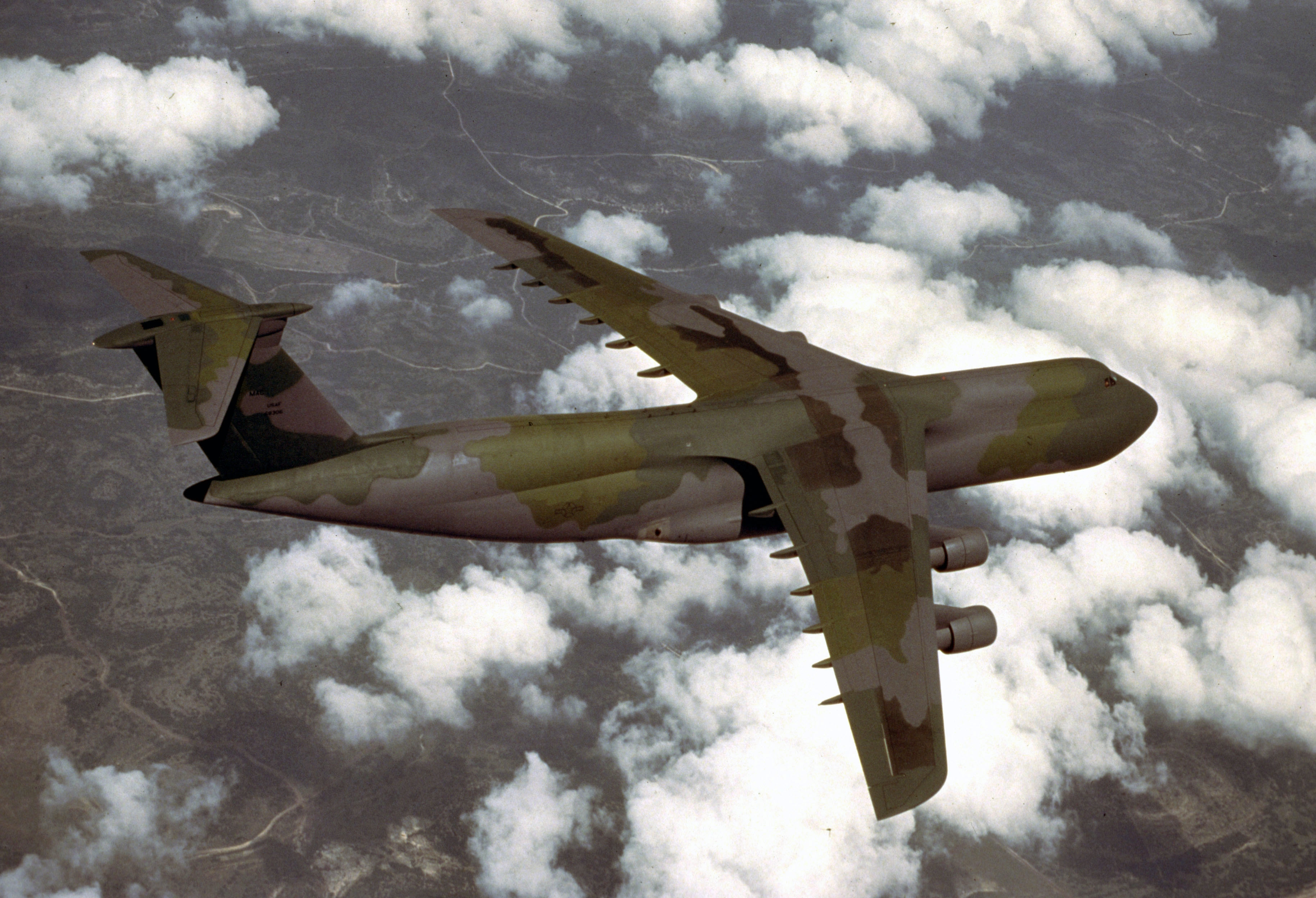
The fourth C-5A Galaxy 66-8306 in the 1980s European One color scheme

Cost overruns and technical problems of the C-5A were the subject of a congressional investigation in 1968 and 1969. The C-5 program was the first development program with a $1‑billion (equivalent to $8.8 billion today) overrun. Due to the C-5's troubled development, the Department of Defense abandoned Total Package Procurement. In 1969, Henry Durham raised concerns about the C-5 production process with Lockheed, his employer. Subsequently, Durham was transferred and subjected to abuse until he resigned. The Government Accountability Office substantiated some of his charges against Lockheed. Later, the American Ethical Union honored Durham with the Elliott-Black Award. The Deputy Assistant Secretary of the Air Force for Management Systems, Ernest Fitzgerald, was another person whose fostering of public accountability was unwelcome.

Upon completion of testing in December 1969, the first C-5A was transferred to the Transitional Training Unit at Altus Air Force Base, Oklahoma. Lockheed delivered the first operational Galaxy to the 437th Airlift Wing, Charleston Air Force Base, South Carolina, in June 1970. Due to higher than expected development costs, in 1970, public calls were made for the government to split the substantial losses that Lockheed was experiencing. Production was nearly brought to a halt in 1971 as Lockheed went through financial difficulties, due in part to the C-5 Galaxy's development, as well as a civilian jet liner, the Lockheed L-1011. The U.S. government gave loans to Lockheed to keep the company operational.

In the early 1970s, NASA considered the C-5 for the Shuttle Carrier Aircraft role, to transport the Space Shuttle to Kennedy Space Center. However, the C-5 was rejected in favor of the Boeing 747, in part due to the 747's low-wing design. In contrast, the Soviet Union chose to transport its shuttles using the high-winged An-225, which derived from the An-124, which is similar in design and function to the C-5.

During static and fatigue testing, cracks were noticed in the wings of several aircraft, and as a consequence, the C-5A fleet was restricted to 80% of maximum design loads. To reduce wing loading, load alleviation systems were added to the aircraft. By 1980, payloads were restricted to as low as 50,000 lb (23,000 kg) for general cargo during peacetime operations. A $1.5 billion program (equivalent to $8.5 billion today), known as H-Mod, to re-wing the 76 completed C-5As to restore full payload capability and service life began in 1976. After design and testing of the new wing design, the C-5As received their new wings from 1980 to 1987.

=== Air-launched Minuteman ICBM feasibility test ===
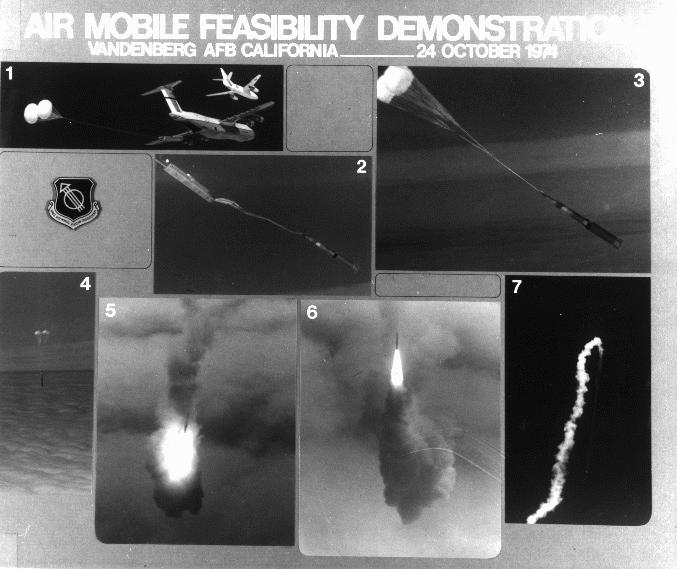
C-5A Minuteman Air Mobile ICBM Feasibility Demonstration – 24 October 1974 (video)

On 24 October 1974, the Space and Missile Systems Organization successfully conducted an air-launched ballistic missile test, where an 86,000-pound (39,000 kg) LGM-30B Minuteman I ICBM was extracted by parachute from a C-5A Galaxy at 20,000 feet (6,100 m) over the Pacific Ocean. The missile descended to 8,000 feet (2,400 m) before its rocket engine fired. The 10-second engine burn carried the missile to 20,000 feet (6,100 m) again before it dropped into the ocean. The test proved the feasibility of launching an intercontinental ballistic missile from the air (see video). Operational deployment was discarded due to engineering and security difficulties, though the capability was used as a negotiating point in the Strategic Arms Limitation Talks. 39 years later, aircraft 69–0014, "Zero-One-Four" used in the test was retired to the Air Mobility Command Museum at Dover Air Force Base, becoming the first C-5 Galaxy retired to a museum.

=== Restarted production and development ===
In 1974, Imperial Iran, having good relations with the United States, offered $160 million (equivalent to $1,045 million today) to restart C-5 production to enable Iran to purchase aircraft for their own air force, in a similar climate as to their acquisition of F-14 Tomcat fighters. However, no C-5s were ordered by Iran, and the prospect was firmly halted by the Iranian Revolution in 1979 when the Imperial State of Iran was replaced by the Islamic State of Iran.

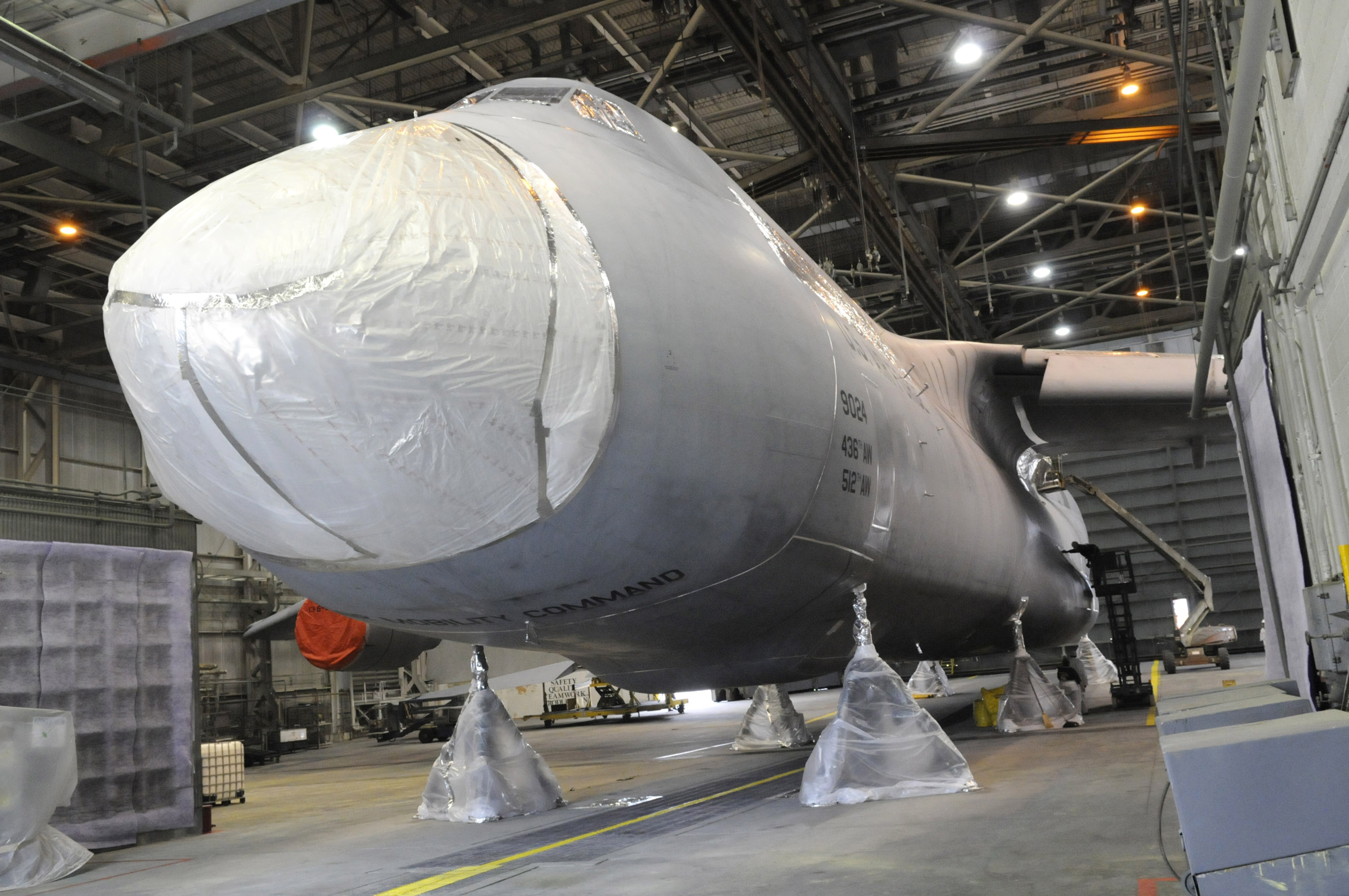
A Galaxy undergoing the AMP and RERP upgrades, to become a C-5M

As part of President Ronald Reagan's military policy, funding was made available for expansion of the USAF's airlift capability. With the C-17 program still some years from completion, Congress approved funding for a new version of the C-5, the C-5B, in July 1982, to expand airlift capacity. The first C-5B was delivered to Altus Air Force Base in January 1986. In April 1989, the last of 50 C-5B aircraft was added to the 77 C-5As in the Air Force's airlift force structure. The C-5B includes all C-5A improvements and numerous additional system modifications to improve reliability and maintainability.

In 1998, the Avionics Modernization Program (AMP) began upgrading the C-5's avionics to include a glass cockpit, navigation equipment, and a new autopilot system. Another part of the C-5 modernization effort is the Reliability Enhancement and Re-engining Program (RERP). The program replaced the engines with newer, more powerful ones.

A total of 52 C-5s were contracted to be modernized, consisting of 49 B-, two C- and one A-model aircraft through the RERP. The program featured over 70 changes and upgrades, including the newer General Electric engines. Three C-5s underwent RERP for testing purposes. Low-rate initial production started in August 2009 with Lockheed reaching full production in May 2011; 22 C-5M Super Galaxies have been completed as of August 2014. RERP upgrades were completed on 25 July 2018. The Air Force received the last modified aircraft on 1 August 2018.

In 2014, Lockheed investigated drag reduction by plasma-heating of turbulent transonic airflow in critical points, saving overall weight by reducing fuel consumption. The Air Force Research Laboratory looked into shape-memory alloy for speed-dependent vortex generators.

== Design ==
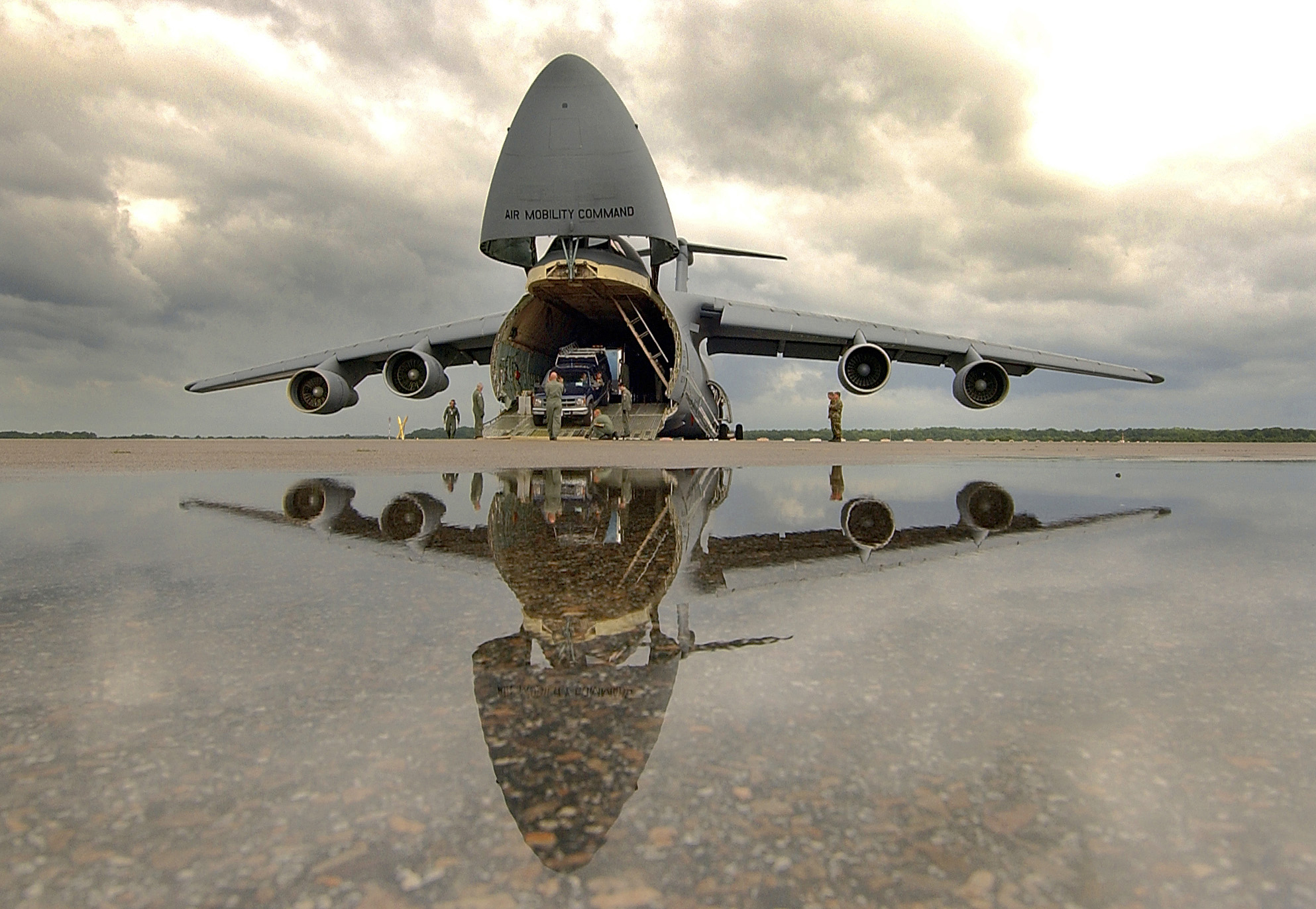
Lockheed C-5 Galaxy loading on a wet airfield in Bush Field, Georgia

The C-5 is a large, high-wing cargo aircraft with a high T-tail and wings that are swept 25° which mount four General Electric turbofan engines — initially GE TF39s, but later upgraded to GE CF6s. It was similar in layout to the smaller Lockheed military transport, the C-141 Starlifter, which was introduced in 1965. The C-5 has 12 internal wing tanks and is equipped for aerial refueling. Above the cargo deck is an upper deck for the cockpit and seating for 80 passengers in rear-facing seats and Loadmasters in forward-facing seats.

The cargo hold of the C-5 is one foot (30 cm) longer than the entire length of the first powered flight by the Wright brothers at Kitty Hawk, North Carolina. For its voracious consumption of fuel and its maintenance and reliability issues the Galaxy's aircrews have nicknamed it "FRED", for Fucking (Note: Sometimes written as "fantastic".) Ridiculous Economic/Environmental Disaster.

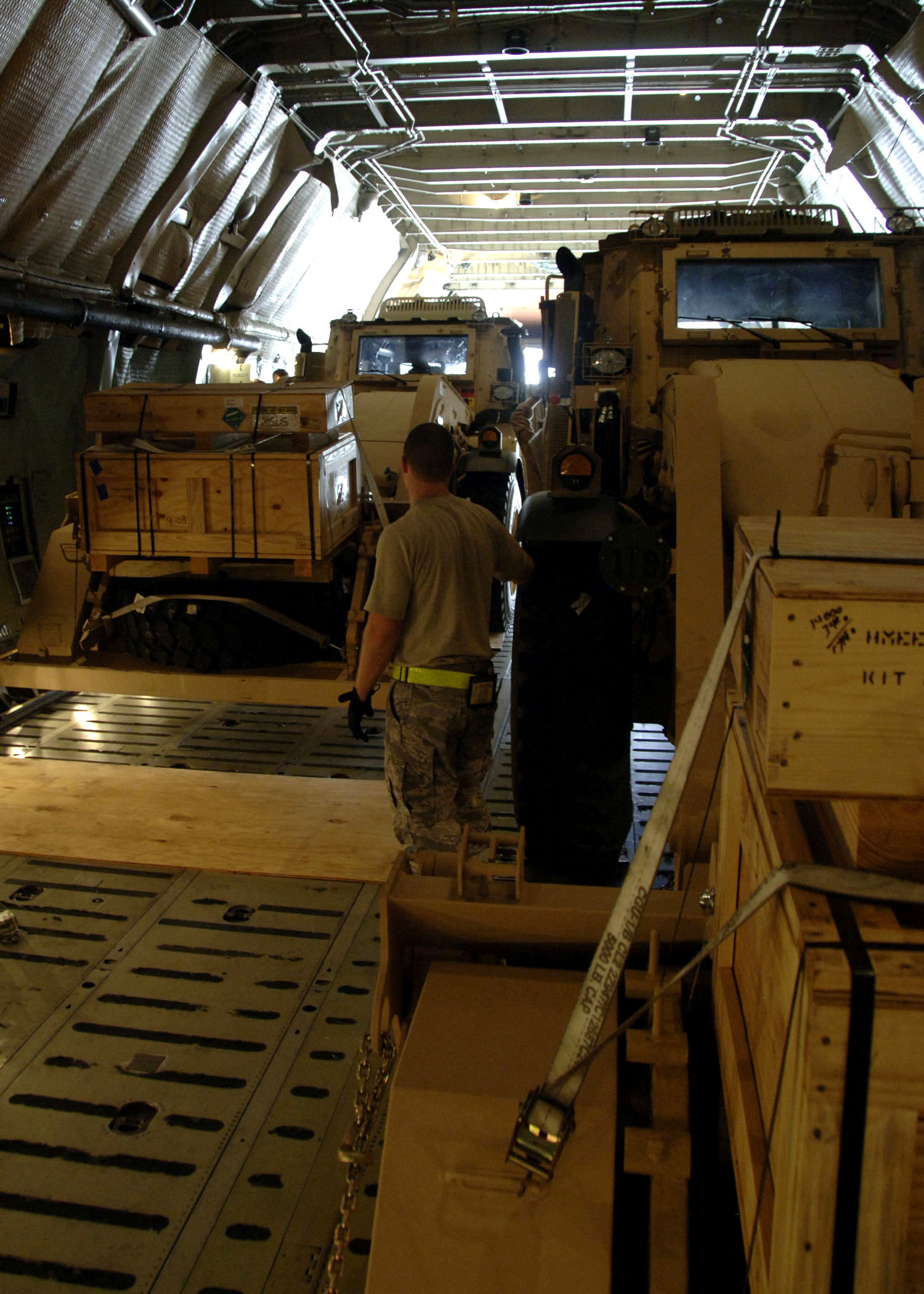
JCB HMEE backhoe loader stowed inside a C-5. The loadmasters ensure cargo is balanced during loading and secured before takeoff.

Takeoff and landing distance requirements for the plane at maximum-load weights are 8,300 ft (2,500 m) and 4,900 ft (1,500 m), respectively. Its high-flotation main landing gear provides 28 wheels to distribute the weight on paved or earth surfaces. The rear main landing gear can be made to caster to make a smaller turning radius, and rotates 90° after takeoff before being retracted. "Kneeling" landing gear lowers the aircraft when parked so the cargo deck is at truck-bed height to make it easy to load and unload.

The C-5 has a malfunction detection analysis and recording system to identify maintenance issues. The cargo compartment is 121 ft (37 m) long, 13.5 ft (4.1 m) high, and 19 ft (5.8 m) wide, or just over 31,000 ft^{3} (880 m^{3}). It can accommodate up to 36 463L master pallets or a mix of palletized cargo and vehicles. The nose and aft cargo-bay doors open the full width and height of the cargo bay to maximize efficient loading of oversized equipment. Full-width ramps enable loading double rows of vehicles from either end of the cargo hold.

The C-5 Galaxy is capable of moving nearly every type of military combat equipment, including such bulky items as the Army armored vehicle launched bridge, at 74 short tons (67 t), from the United States to any location on the globe; and of accommodating up to six Boeing AH-64 Apache helicopters or five Bradley Fighting Vehicles at one time.

== Operational history ==
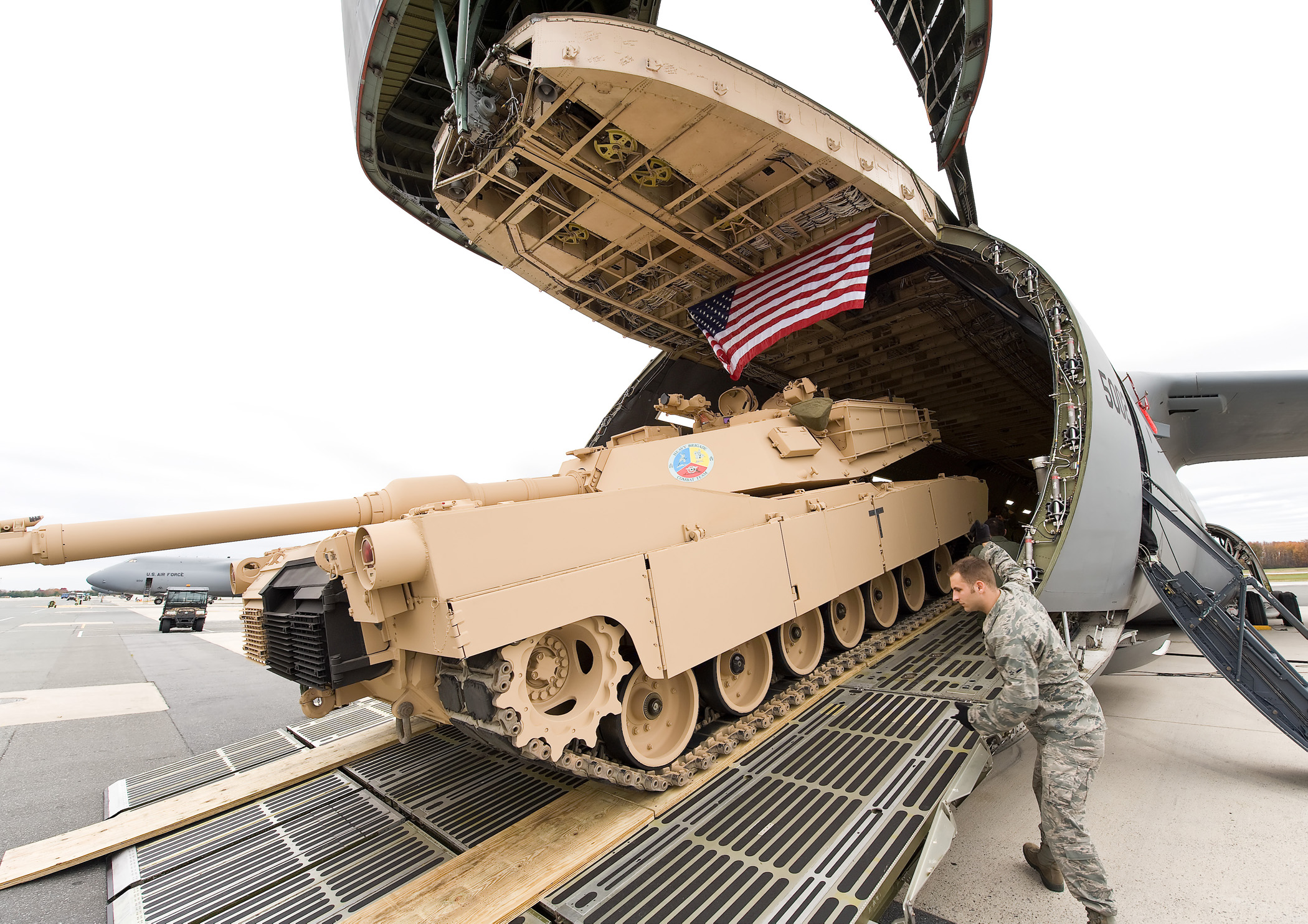
Loading an M1A1 Abrams tank onto a C-5 Galaxy

The first C-5A was delivered to the USAF on 17 December 1969. Wings were built up in the early 1970s at Altus AFB, Oklahoma; Charleston AFB, South Carolina; Dover AFB, Delaware; and Travis AFB, California. The C-5's first mission was on 9 July 1970, in Southeast Asia during the Vietnam War. C-5s were used to transport equipment and troops, including Army tanks and even some small aircraft, throughout the later years of the US action in Vietnam. In the final weeks of the war, prior to the Fall of Saigon, several C-5s were involved in evacuation efforts. During one such mission, a C-5A crashed while transporting a large number of orphans, with over 140 killed.

C-5s have also been used to deliver support and reinforce various US allies over the years. During the Yom Kippur War in 1973, multiple C-5s and C-141 Starlifters delivered critical supplies of ammunition, replacement weaponry and other forms of aid to Israel, the US effort was named as Operation Nickel Grass. The C-5 Galaxy's performance in Israel was such that the Pentagon began to consider further purchases. The C-5 was regularly made available to support American allies, such as the British-led peacekeeper initiative in Zimbabwe in 1979.

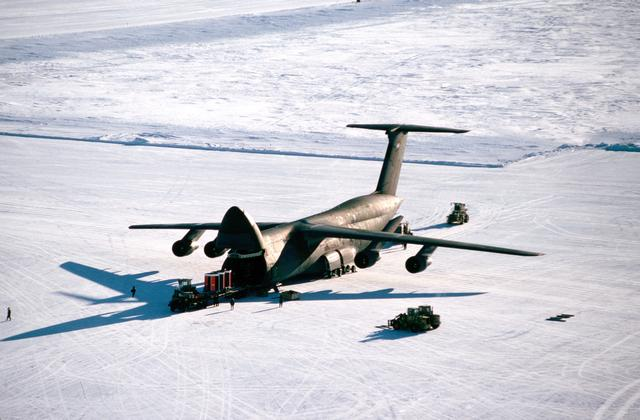
Personnel unload cargo from a C-5 Galaxy at Pegasus Field, an ice runway near McMurdo Station, Antarctica, in 1989.

The C-5 has been used for several unusual functions. During the development of the secretive stealth aircraft, the Lockheed F-117 Nighthawk, Galaxies were often used to carry partly disassembled aircraft, leaving no exterior signs as to their cargo. The C-5 remains the largest aircraft to operate in the Antarctic, capable of operating from Williams Field near McMurdo Station. The C-5 Galaxy was a major supply asset in the international coalition operations in 1990–91 against Iraq in the Gulf War. C-5s have routinely delivered relief aid and humanitarian supplies to areas afflicted with natural disasters or crisis; multiple flights were made over Rwanda in 1994. The C-5 is also used to transport the helicopters that often serve as Marine One.

The wings on the C-5As were replaced during the 1980s to restore full design capability. The USAF took delivery of the first C-5B on 28 December 1985 and the final one in April 1989. The reliability of the C-5 fleet has been a continued issue throughout its lifetime, however the C-5M upgrade program seeks in part to address this issue. Their strategic airlift capacity has been a key logistical component of U.S. military operations in Afghanistan and Iraq. Following an incident during Operation Iraqi Freedom where one C-5 was damaged by a projectile, the installation of defensive systems has become a stated priority.

=== Upgrades to C-5M Super Galaxy ===
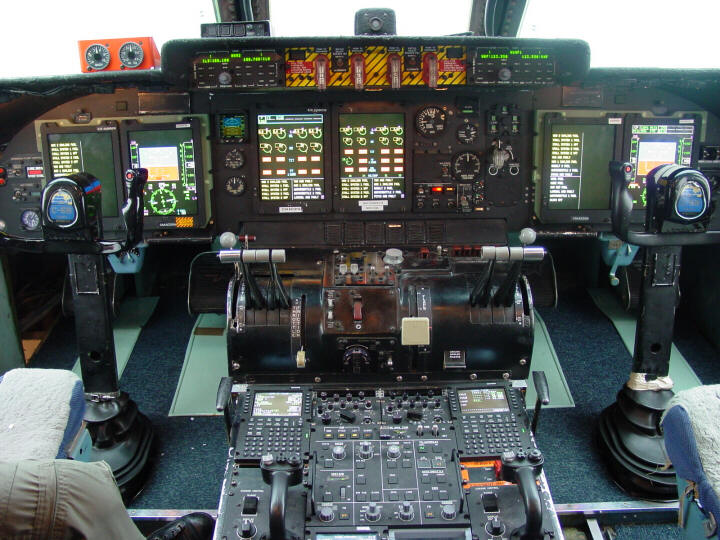
New C-5 cockpit avionics, installed under the Avionics Modernization Program

Following a study showing that 80% of the C-5 airframe's service life was remaining, Air Mobility Command (AMC) began an aggressive program to modernize all remaining C-5Bs and C-5Cs and many of the C-5As. The C-5 Avionics Modernization Program (AMP) began in 1998 and includes upgrading the avionics to comply with Global Air Traffic Management standards, improving communications, fitting new flat-panel displays, improving navigation and safety equipment, and installing a new autopilot system. The first flight of a C-5 with AMP (85-0004) occurred on 21 December 2002.

The Reliability Enhancement and Re-engining Program (RERP) began in 2006. It includes fitting new General Electric F138-GE-100 (CF6-80C2) engines, pylons and auxiliary power units, and upgrades to aircraft skin and frame, landing gear, cockpit and pressurization systems. Each CF6 engine produces 22% more thrust (50,000 lbf or 220 kN), providing a 30% shorter takeoff, a 38% higher climb rate to initial altitude, an increased cargo load and a longer range. Upgrades to all fifty C-5Bs and both C-5Cs were completed by August 2018. These aircraft are now designated C-5M Super Galaxy.

The C-5 AMP and RERP modernization programs plan to raise mission-capable rate to a minimum goal of 75%. Over the next 40 years, the U.S. Air Force estimates the C-5M will save over $20 billion. The first C-5M conversion was completed on 16 May 2006 and C-5Ms began test flights at Dobbins Air Reserve Base in June 2006. In 2008, the USAF decided to convert remaining C-5Bs and C-5Cs into C-5Ms with avionics upgrades and re-engining. The C-5As will receive only the avionics upgrades. The last of 52 C-5Ms was delivered to Air Mobility Command in August 2018.

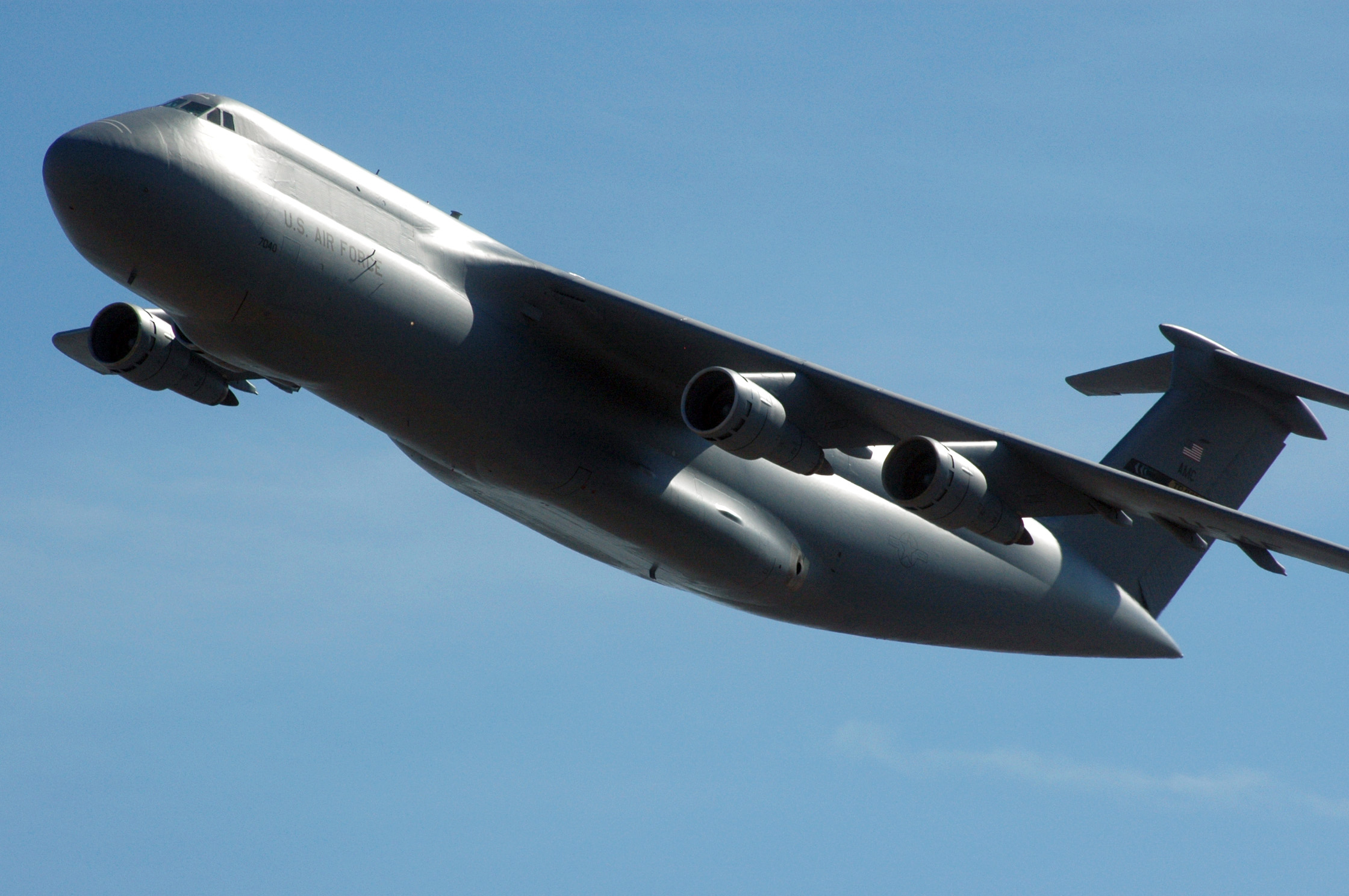
A C-5 taking off from Robins AFB

In response to Air Force plans to retire older C-5 aircraft, Congress implemented legislation that set limits on retirement plans for C-5As in 2003. As of November 2013, 45 C-5As have been retired, 11 have been scrapped, parts of one (A/C 66-8306) are now a cargo load trainer at Lackland AFB, Texas, and one was sent to the Warner Robins Air Logistics Center (WR-ALC) for tear down and inspection to evaluate structural integrity and estimate the remaining life for the fleet.

The U.S. Air Force began to receive refitted C-5M aircraft in December 2008. Full production of C-5Ms began in the summer of 2009. In 2009, the Congressional ban on the retirement of C-5s was overturned. The Air Force seeks to retire one C-5A for every 10 new C-17s ordered. In October 2011, the 445th Airlift Wing based at Wright-Patterson Air Force Base replaced all remaining C-5s with C-17s. The C-5M reached initial operating capability (IOC) on 24 February 2014 with 16 aircraft delivered.

On 13 September 2009, a C-5M set 41 new records and flight data was submitted to the National Aeronautic Association for formal recognition. The C-5M had carried a payload of 176,610 lb (80,110 kg) to over 41,100 ft (12,500 m) in 23 minutes, 59 seconds. Additionally, 33 time to climb records at various payload classes were set, and the world record for greatest payload to 6,562 ft (2,000 m) was broken. The aircraft was in the category of 551,200 to 661,400 lb (250,000 to 300,000 kg) with a takeoff weight of 649,680 lb (294,690 kg) including payload, fuel, and other equipment.

On 18 July 2017, C-5s based at Dover were ordered to stand down so maintenance crews could determine the cause for some nose landing gear failing. The last TF39-powered C-5 flew in late 2017.

=== Replacement plans ===
The USAF plans to replace its fleet of C-5M Galaxy, and C-17 Globemaster III with a new fleet of heavy airlifters called the Next-Generation Airlifter (NGAL) due to concerns of the airframes becoming obsolete. Procurement is planned to start in 2038. The goal of the new program is to be a "two-for-one". "When I say two-for-one, we're probably going to procure one aircraft," Air Force General John Lamontagne, former head of Air Mobility Command, further clarified. "We won't get a C-5 replacement and a C-17 replacement. There'll be one airplane that does strategic airlift." and "As far as what we want in the next generation airlift platform, we want agility, we want speed, we want to be able to operate in a higher threat environment," said General Lamontagne due to growing concern from China's activity in developing and fielding new air-to-air and surface-to-air missiles. It is currently expected to reach initial operational capability by 2041, anticipating an acquisition rate of 7.4 aircraft per year. However, current projections indicate that both the C-5M and C-17 are expected to remain in service until 2045 and 2075, respectively.

== Variants ==
=== C-5A ===
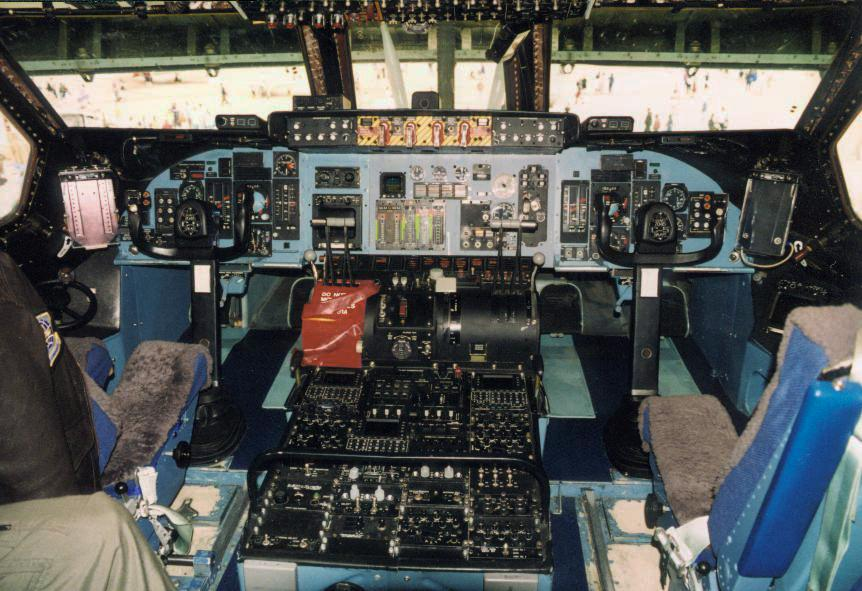
Instrument panel of a C-5A

The C-5A is the original version of the C-5. From 1969 to 1973, 81 C-5As were delivered to the Military Airlift Command of the U.S. Air Force. Due to cracks found in the wings in the mid-1970s, the cargo weight was restricted. To restore the C-5's full capability, the wing structure was redesigned. A program to install new strengthened wings on 77 C-5As was conducted from 1981 to 1987. The redesigned wing made use of a new aluminum alloy that did not exist during the original production. As of August 2016, there were ten A-models in service flown by the Air Force Reserve Command's 433d Airlift Wing at Lackland AFB / Kelly Field, Texas, and 439th Airlift Wing at Westover ARB, Massachusetts. The last operational C-5A was retired on 7 September 2017.

=== C-5B ===
The C-5B is an improved version of the C-5A. It incorporated all modifications and improvements made to the C-5A with improved wings, simplified landing gear, upgraded TF-39-GE-1C turbofan engines and updated avionics. Fifty examples of the new variant were delivered to the U.S. Air Force from 1986 to 1989.

=== C-5C ===
The C-5C is a specially modified variant for transporting large cargo. Two C-5As (68-0213 and 68-0216) were modified following major accidents to have a larger internal cargo capacity to accommodate the large payloads, such as satellites. The major modifications were the removal of the rear passenger compartment floor, splitting the rear cargo door in the middle, and installing a new movable aft bulkhead further to the rear. The official C-5 technical manual refers to the version as C-5A(SCM) Space Cargo Modified. Modifications also included adding a second inlet for ground power, which can feed any power-dependent equipment that may form part of the cargo. The two C-5Cs are operated by U.S. Air Force crews for DOD spacecraft programs and NASA, and are stationed at Travis AFB, California.

=== C-5D ===
A Variant proposed during the 1990s with the Non-Developmental Airlift Aircraft (NDAA) program as an alternative to further purchases of the McDonnell Douglas C-17 Globemaster III as well as a replacement for older C-5As. The C-5D was to have General Electric F138-GE-100 (CF6-80C2) engines, improved avionics and significantly improved reliability and maintainability, although it could not use austere runways or conduct airdrop operations and had a higher expected operating cost. The plan was canceled in favor of the purchase of more C-17s. The specifications of the C-5D were later used in the C-5M upgrade program.

=== L-500 ===
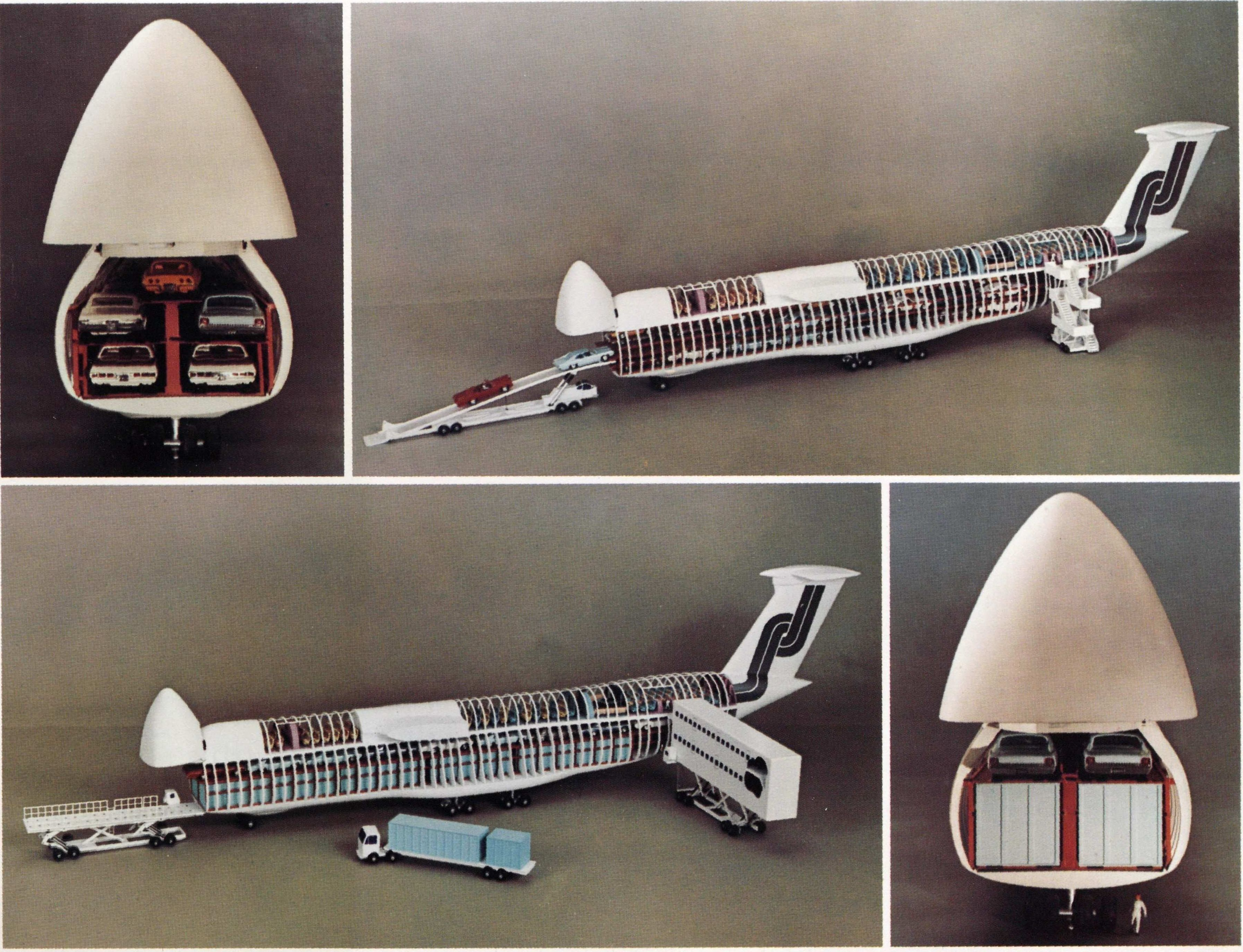
Lockheed L-500 model featured in the 1968 annual report of Universal Airlines

Lockheed also planned a civil version of the C-5 Galaxy, the L-500, also the internal company designation for the C-5 itself. Both passenger and cargo versions of the L-500 were designed. The all-passenger version would have been able to carry up to 1,000 travelers, while the all-cargo version was predicted to be able to carry typical C-5 volume for as little as 2 cents per ton-mile (in 1967 dollars). An order for six L-500s and another six options was negotiated by Executive Jet Aviation (EJA) (today better known as NetJets) contingent on obtaining government permission to buy a small Montana airline, Johnson Flying Service, part of highly ambitious plans that came to nothing in the late 1960s when it was discovered that EJA was backed by the Pennsylvania Railroad, it then being illegal for a railroad to own an airline.

Another L-500 proponent was Lamar Muse, then CEO of Universal Airlines, a US charter carrier, later the highly-successful founding CEO of Southwest Airlines. Muse believed the L-500 could be used to cheaply transport people with their cars. A cutaway model of a passenger/freight hybrid L-500 featured in Universal Airlines 1968 annual report (see External links for a link). Lockheed's CEO flew to Universal's Michigan headquarters to let Muse know personally when Lockheed's board decided it could not go further with the L-500, given its commitment to the Lockheed L-1011 widebody jetliner, then in development. Muse noted later that perhaps Lockheed made the wrong decision, given that the L-1011 was ultimately a significant financial failure.

=== C-5 Shuttle Carrier ===
Lockheed proposed a twin body C-5 as a Shuttle Carrier Aircraft to counter the Conroy Virtus, but the design (along with the normal single-body C-5 that was also considered) was turned down in favor of the low-wing Boeing 747.

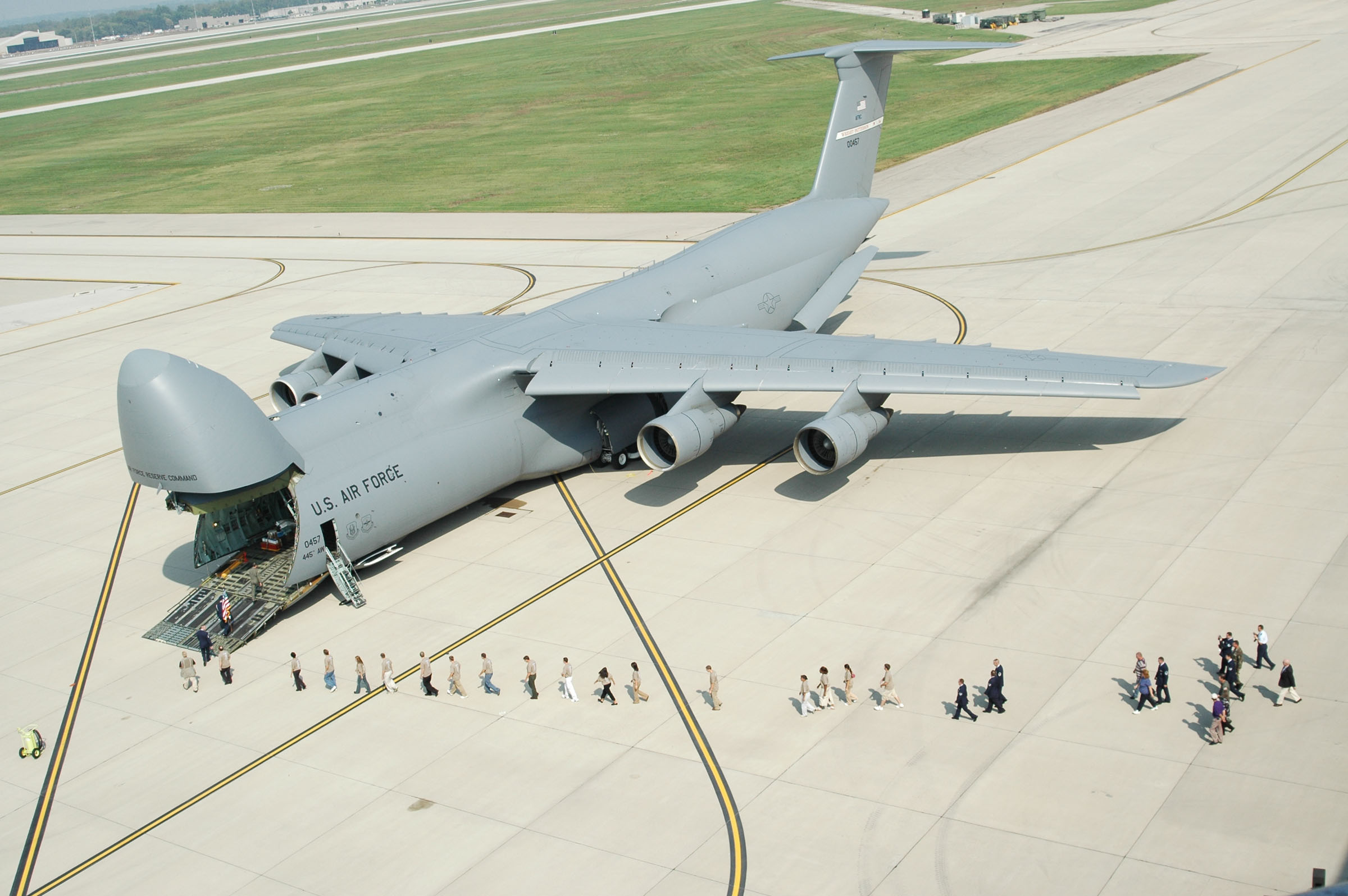
People in line to enter the 445th Airlift Wing's first C-5A Galaxy in 2005

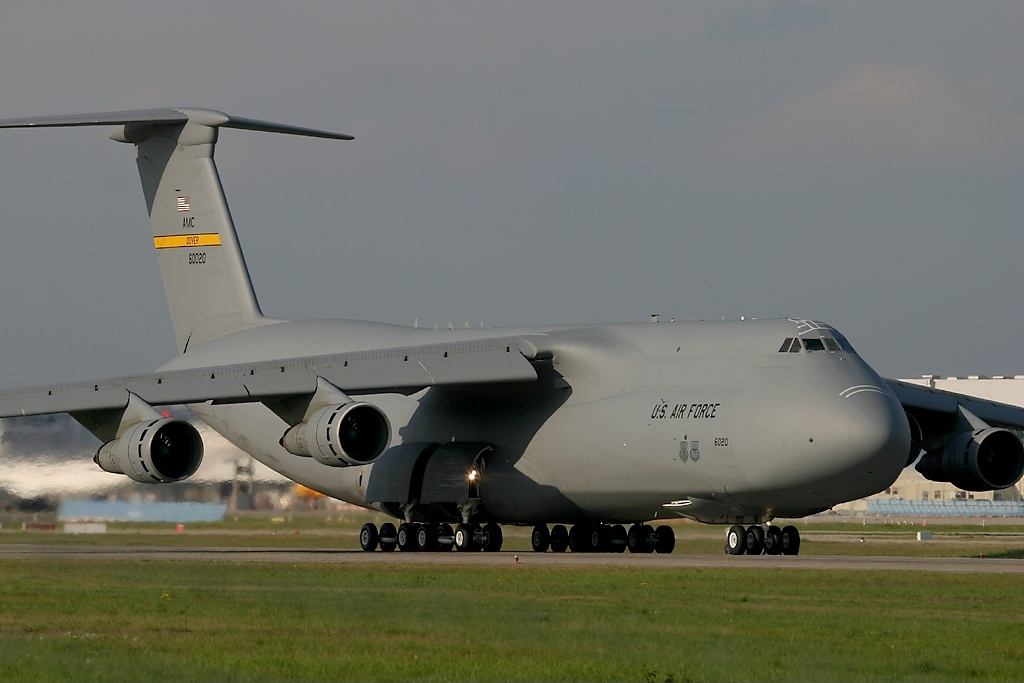
C-5B Galaxy at Rhein-Main AB

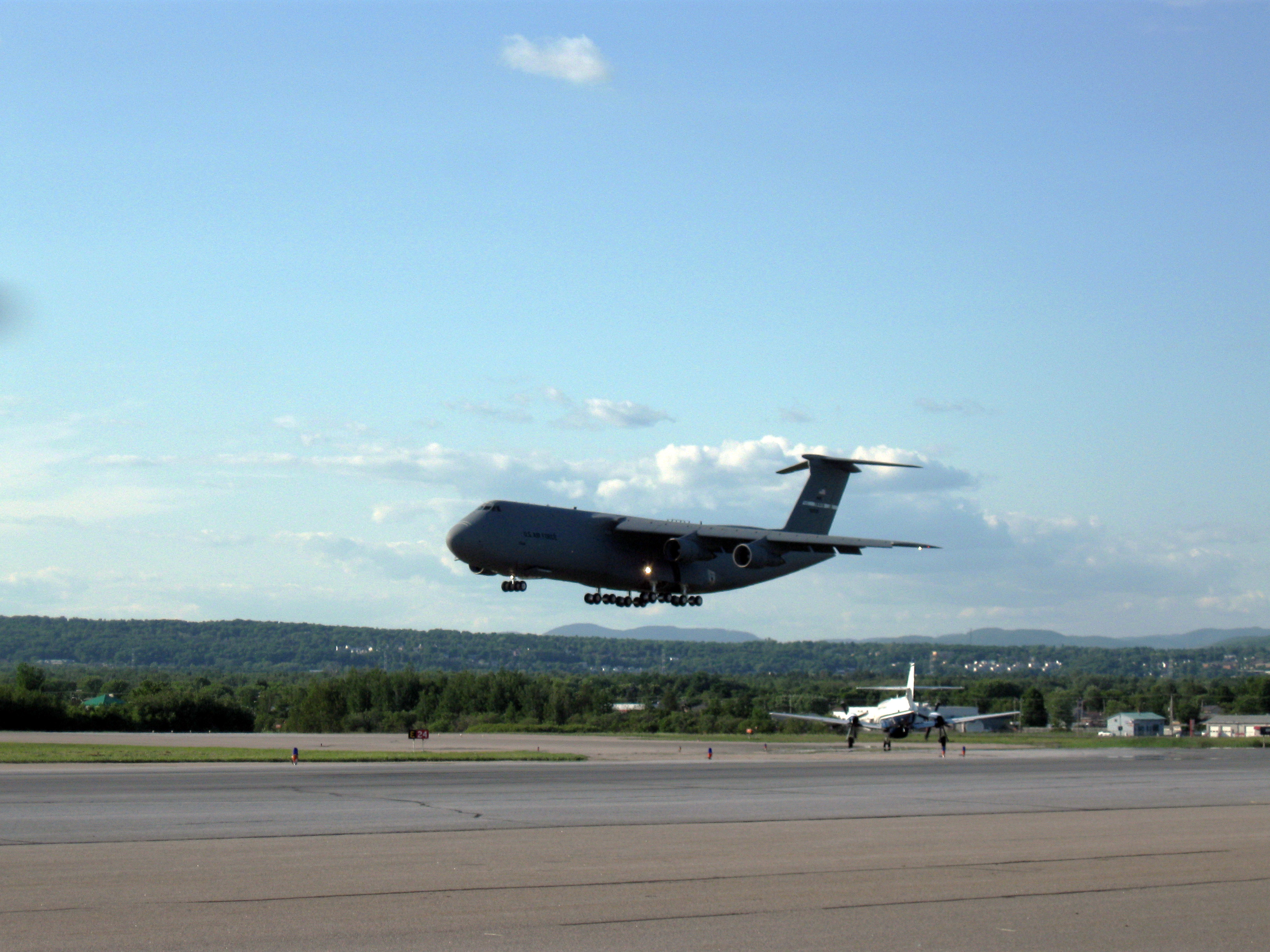
A C-5 landing at Québec City Jean Lesage International Airport (CYQB)

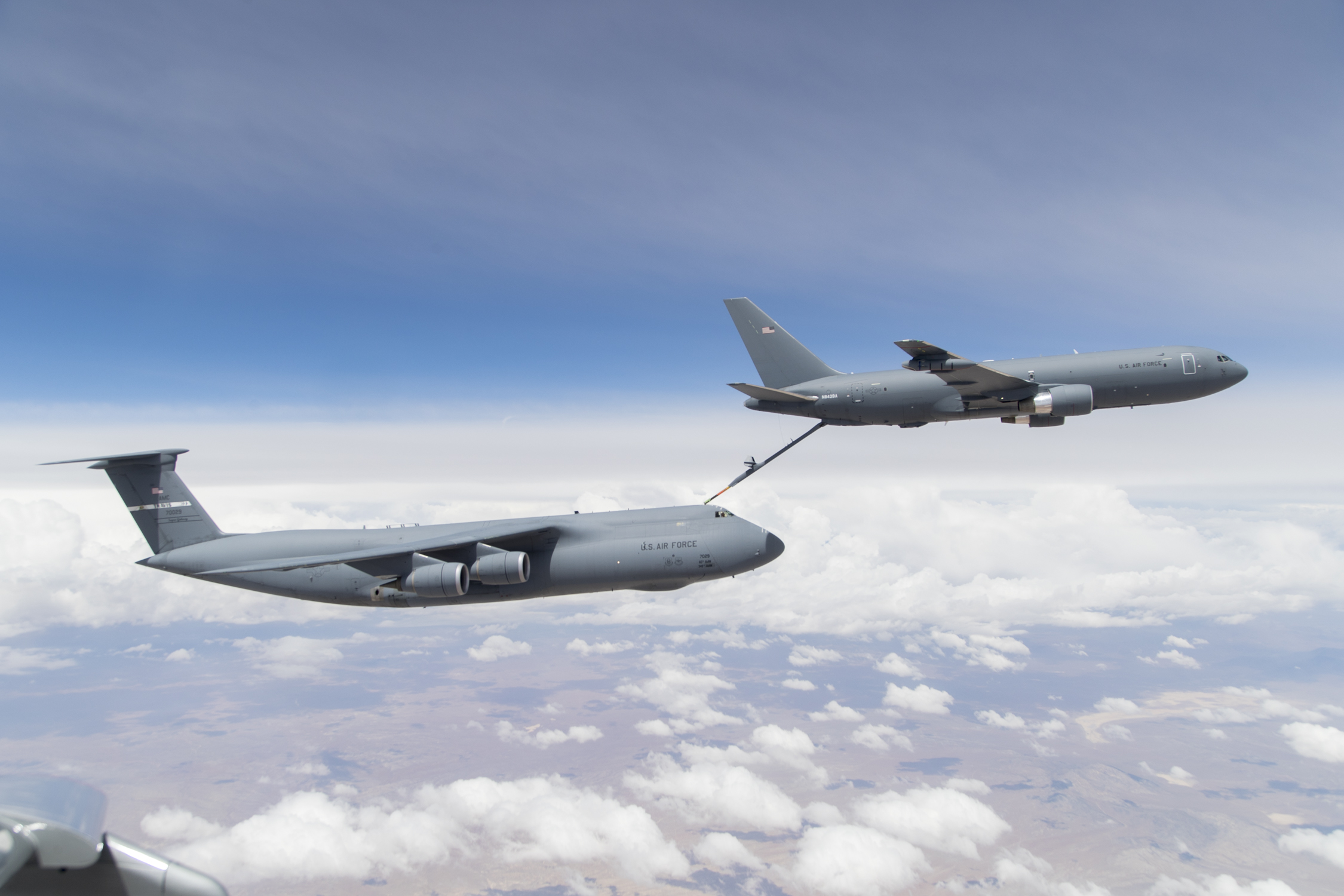
A Boeing KC-46 Pegasus refuels a C-5M Galaxy from Travis AFB over California, April 2019.

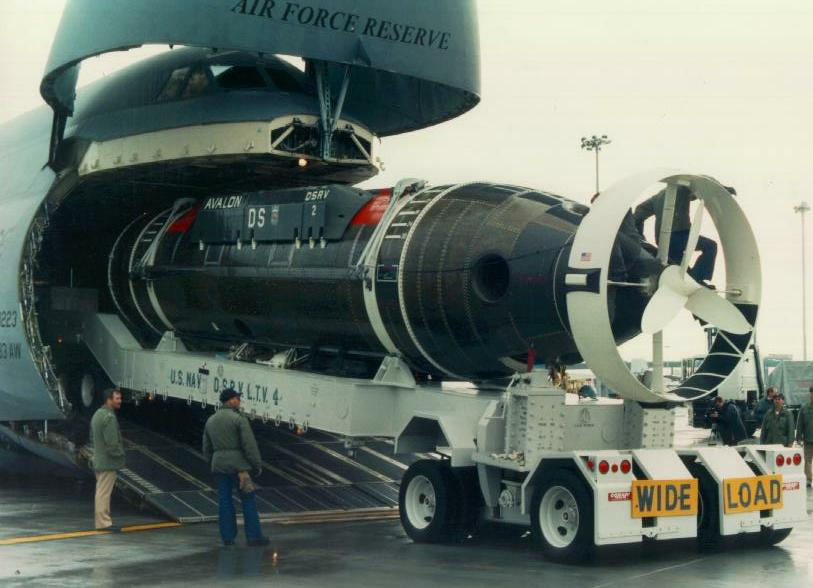
Loading a Mystic-class deep-submergence rescue vehicle onto a C-5

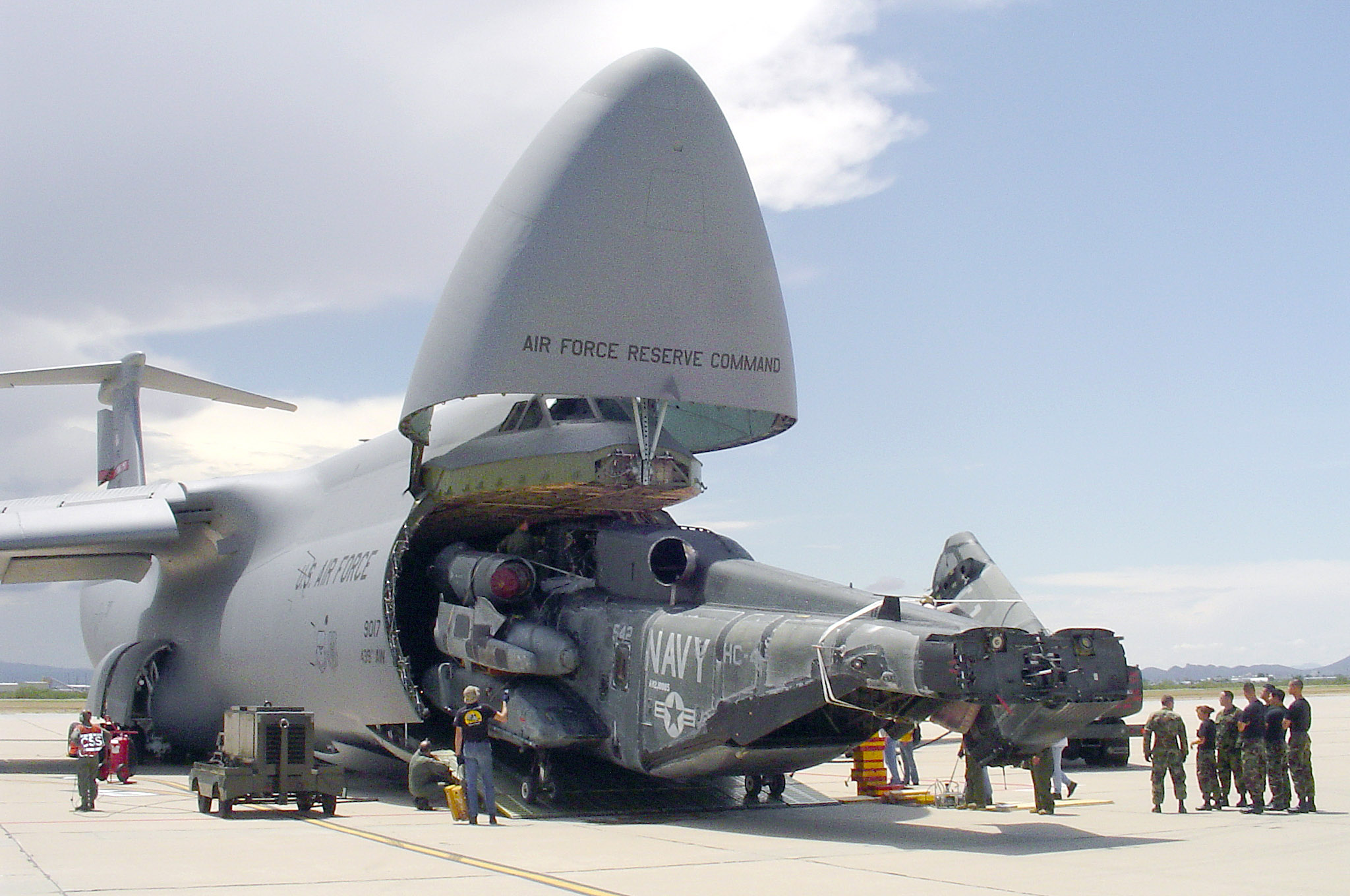
Loading a Super Stallion on a C-5A

== Operators ==
United States

- United States Air Force – 52 C-5Ms in service as of April 2025

- Air Mobility Command

- 60th Air Mobility Wing – Travis Air Force Base, California

22nd Airlift Squadron (1972–present)

- 436th Airlift Wing – Dover Air Force Base, Delaware

9th Airlift Squadron (1971–present)

- Air Force Reserve Command

- 349th Air Mobility Wing (Associate) – Travis Air Force Base, California

312th Airlift Squadron (1973–present)

- 413th Flight Test Group – Robins AFB, Georgia

339th Flight Test Squadron (1998–present)

- 433d Airlift Wing – Kelly Field Annex, Texas

68th Airlift Squadron (1985–present)
356th Airlift Squadron (2007–present)

- 439th Airlift Wing – Westover Air Reserve Base, Massachusetts

337th Airlift Squadron (1987–present)

- 512th Airlift Wing (Associate) – Dover Air Force Base, Delaware

709th Airlift Squadron (1973–present)

=== Former operators ===
United States

- United States Air Force

- Military Airlift Command/Air Mobility Command

- 60th Military Airlift Wing/Air Mobility Wing – Travis Air Force Base, California

21st Airlift Squadron (1993–2006)
75th Military Airlift Squadron (1970–1992)

- 436th Military Airlift Wing/Airlift Wing – Dover Air Force Base, Delaware

3rd Military Airlift Squadron/Airlift Squadron (1973–2007)
31st Military Airlift Squadron/Airlift Squadron (1989–1994)

- 437th Military Airlift Wing – Charleston Air Force Base, South Carolina

3rd Military Airlift Squadron (1970–1973)

- 443d Military Airlift Wing – Altus Air Force Base, Oklahoma

56th Military Airlift Squadron (1969–1992)

- 97th Air Mobility Wing – Altus AFB, Oklahoma

56th Military Airlift/56th Airlift Squadron (1992–2007)

- Air Force Reserve Command

- 349th Military Airlift Wing/Air Mobility Wing (Associate) – Travis Air Force Base, California

301st Military Airlift Squadron/Airlift Squadron (1973–2006)

- 445th Military Airlift Wing/445th Airlift Wing – Wright-Patterson AFB, Ohio

89th Airlift Squadron (2006–2012)

- 512th Military Airlift Wing/Airlift Wing (Associate) – Dover Air Force Base, Delaware

326th Military Airlift Squadron/Airlift Squadron (1973–2007)

- Air National Guard

- 105th Military Airlift Group/Military Airlift Wing/105th Airlift Wing – Stewart ANGB, New York

137th Military Airlift Squadron/Airlift Squadron (1985–2012)

- 164th Military Airlift Wing/Airlift Wing – Memphis, Tennessee

155th Military Airlift Squadron/Airlift Squadron (2004–2013)

- 167th Military Airlift Wing/167th Airlift Wing – Martinsburg, West Virginia

167th Military Airlift/167th Airlift Squadron (2006–2015)

== Incidents and accidents ==
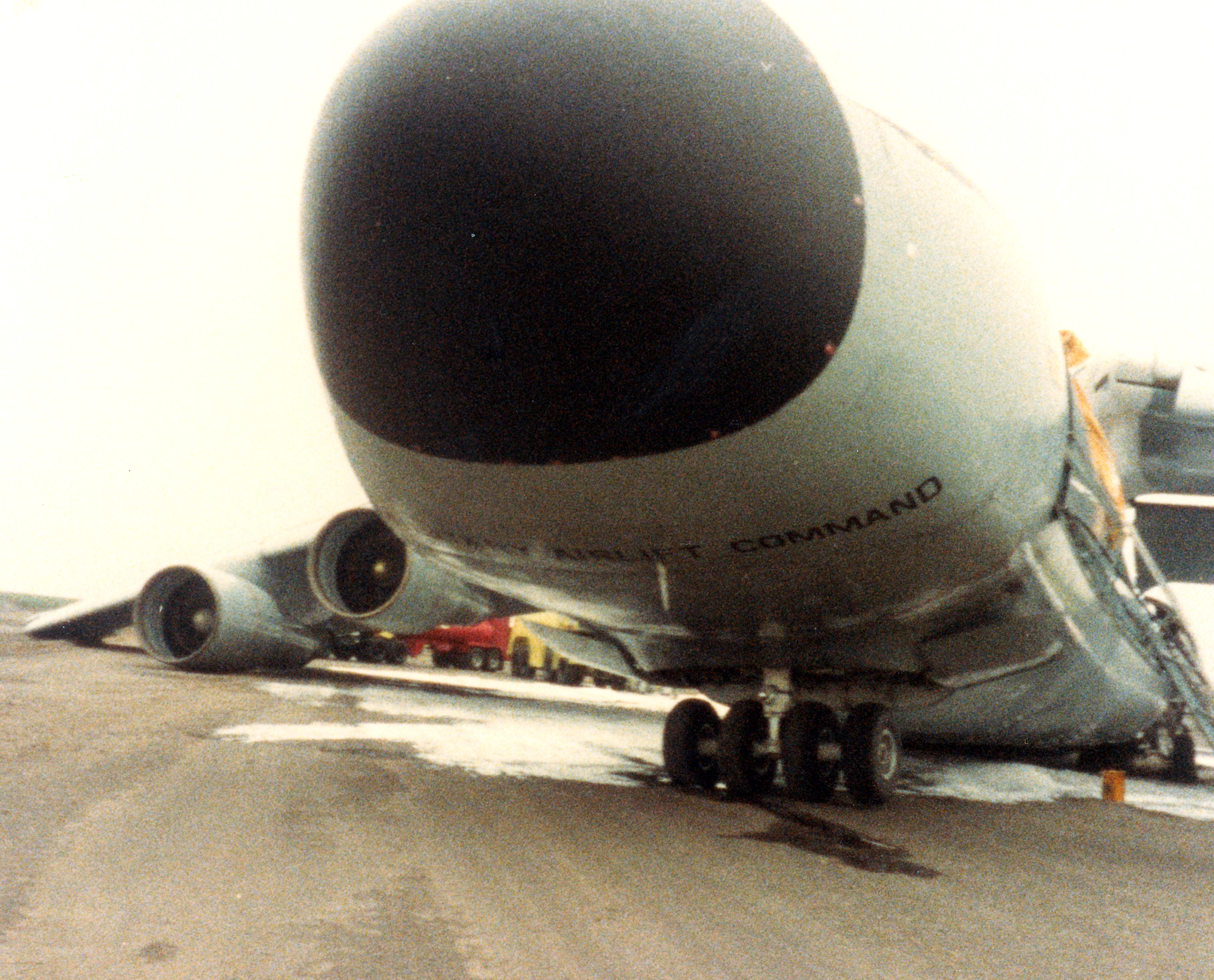
C-5A after crash landing at Shemya AFB, Alaska, July 1983

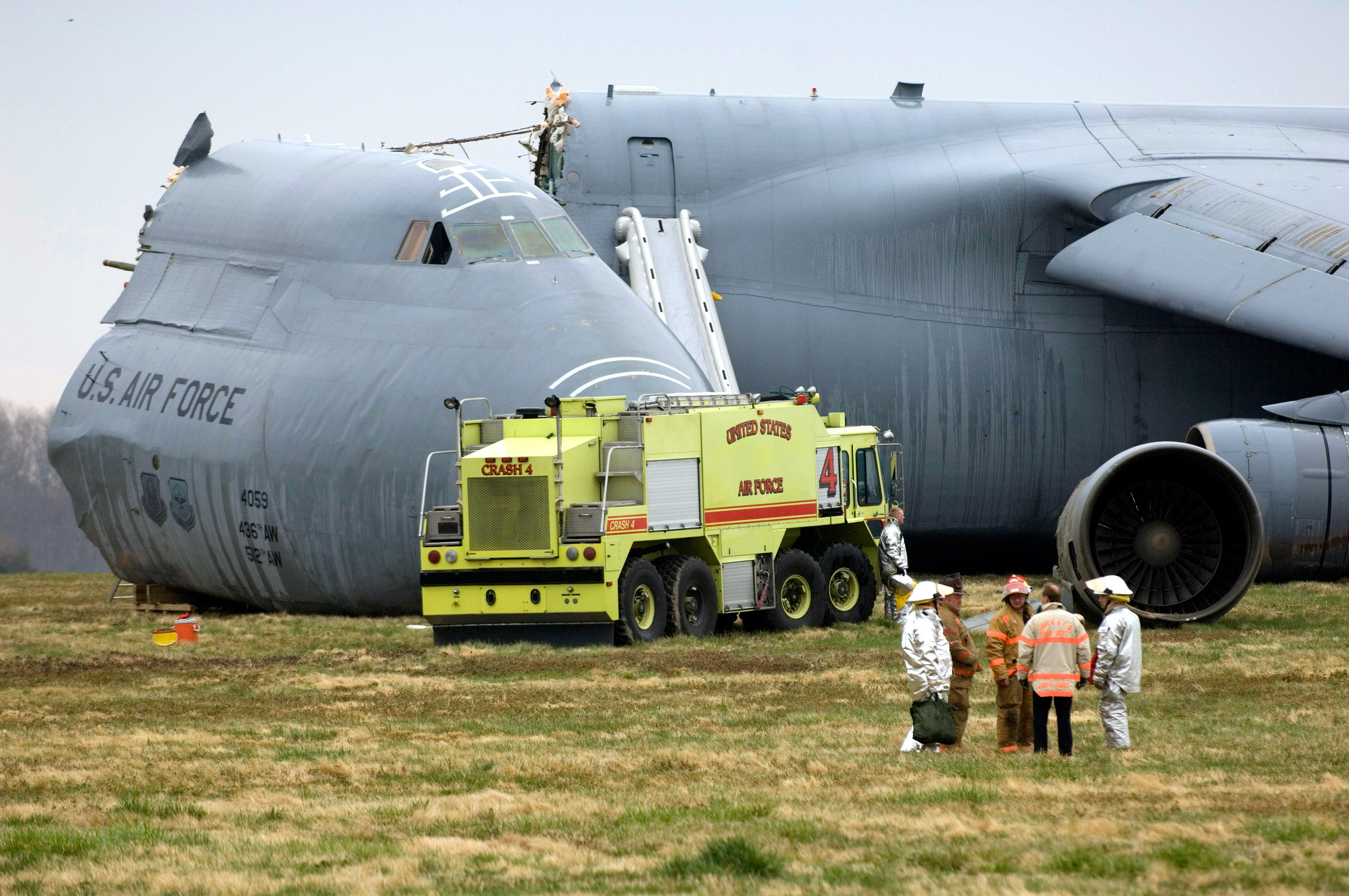
Emergency responders at the scene of a C-5B crash at Dover AFB, Delaware, April 2006

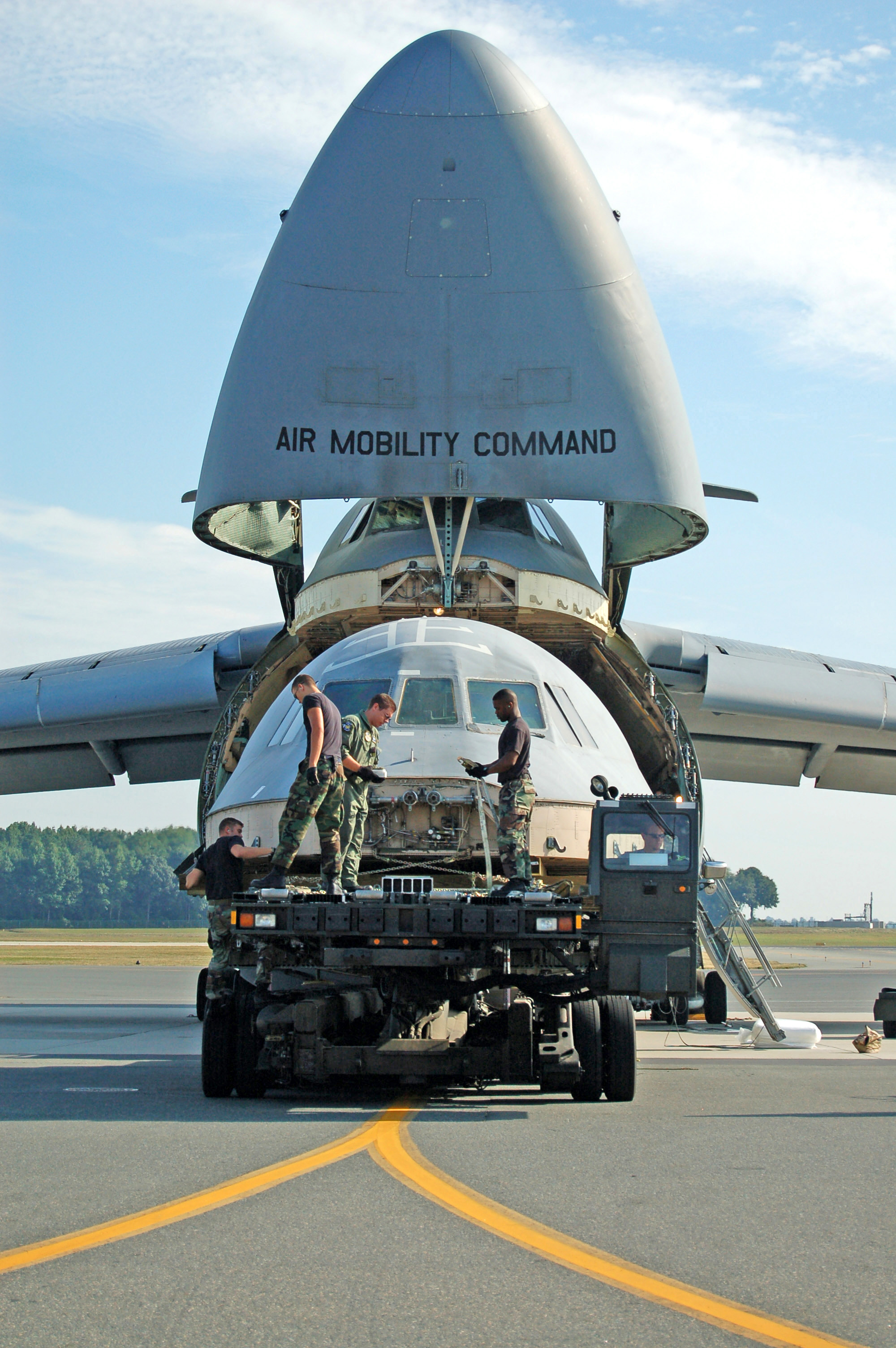
The flight deck from the C-5B crash at Dover AFB in April 2006 being loaded into another C-5

Three C-5 Galaxy aircraft have been lost in crashes along with two class-A losses resulting from ground fire, with a combined total of 169 fatalities. At least two other C-5 crashes have resulted in major airframe damage, but the aircraft were repaired and returned to service.

=== Notable accidents ===
- On 27 May 1970, C-5A AF Serial No. 67-0172 was destroyed during a ground fire at Palmdale, California, after an Air Turbine Motor started backwards and quickly overheated, setting the hydraulic system on fire and consuming the aircraft. The engines were not running at the time of the fire. Five crew escaped, and seven firefighters suffered minor injuries fighting the blaze.
- On 17 October 1970, C-5A AF Serial No. 66-8303 was destroyed during a ground fire at the Lockheed Aircraft plant at Dobbins AFB in Marietta, Georgia. The fire started during maintenance in one of the aircraft's 12 fuel cells. One worker was killed and another injured. This was the first C-5 aircraft produced.
- On 27 September 1974, C-5A Serial No. 68-0227 crashed after over-running the runway at Clinton, Oklahoma, Municipal Airport during an emergency landing following a serious landing gear fire. The crew mistakenly aligned the aircraft for the visual approach into the wrong airport, landing at Clinton Municipal Airport, which has a 4,400 ft (1,300 m) runway, instead of the airfield at Clinton-Sherman Industrial Airpark (former Clinton-Sherman Air Force Base), which has a 13,500 ft (4,100 m) runway. This was the first operational loss of a C-5 Galaxy.
- On 4 April 1975, C-5A Serial No.68-0218 crashed while carrying orphans out of Vietnam during Operation Babylift. This accident is one of the most notorious C-5 accidents to date. The crash occurred while trying to make an emergency landing at Tan Son Nhut Air Base, Saigon, following a rear pressure door lock failure in flight. 144 people (including 78 children) were killed out of the 313 aboard (243 children, 44 escorts, 16 flight crew and 10 medical crew). Use of the C-5 was heavily restricted for several months following the high-profile accident.
- On 31 July 1983, C-5A Serial No. 70-0446 crashed while landing at the former Shemya Air Force Base on Shemya Island in Alaska. The C-5 approached below the glide slope in heavy fog, hit landing light poles and an embankment short of the runway, stopping at the 5,000-foot mark on the runway with the nose gear at the side of the runway embankment. Structural damage was extensive and the two aft main landing gear bogies were sheared from the aircraft. There were no fatalities. A joint USAF–Lockheed team made repairs, enabling a ferry flight from Shemya to the Lockheed plant in Marietta, Georgia, later that year. There, the aircraft was dubbed Phoenix II and permanent repair efforts got under way. In addition to the structural repairs, the aircraft also received an improved landing gear system (common to the then-new C-5B), wing modification, and a color weather radar upgrade. The aircraft was returned to service.
- In July 1983, C-5A Serial No. 68-0216 landed gear up at Travis Air Force Base, California. There were no injuries. The accident occurred while the crew was performing touch-and-go landings, and did not lower the landing gear during the final approach of the day. The aircraft received significant damage to the lower fuselage, ramp, clamshell doors, and main landing gear pods. The C-5A was later flown to Marietta for repairs. While there, the aircraft was selected to be the first C-5A converted to the C-5C configuration.
- On 29 August 1990, C-5A Serial No. 68-0228 crashed following an engine failure shortly after take-off. The aircraft took off from Ramstein Air Base in Germany in support of Operation Desert Shield. It was flown by a nine-member reserve crew from the 68th Airlift Squadron, 433d Airlift Wing based at Kelly AFB, Texas. As the aircraft started to climb off the runway, one of the thrust reversers suddenly deployed. This resulted in loss of control of the aircraft and the subsequent crash. Of the 17 people on board, only four survived the crash. All four were in the rear troop compartment. The sole crew member to survive, Staff Sgt. Lorenzo Galvan Jr., was awarded the Airman's Medal for his actions in evacuating the survivors from the wreckage.
- On 3 April 2006, C-5B Serial No. 84-0059 crashed following a cockpit indication that the thrust reverser on No. 2 engine was not locked. The crew shut down No. 2 engine as a safeguard. The C-5B assigned to the 436th Airlift Wing and flown by a reserve crew from the 709th Airlift Squadron, 512th Airlift Wing crashed about 2,000 ft (610 m) short of the runway while attempting a heavyweight emergency landing at Dover Air Force Base, Delaware. The aircraft had taken off from Dover 21 minutes earlier and reported an in-flight emergency ten minutes into the flight. All 17 people aboard survived, but two sustained serious injuries. The Air Force's accident investigation board report concluded the cause to be human error, in particular the crew had been manipulating the throttle of the (dead) number-two engine as if it were still running while keeping the (live) number-three engine at idle. The situation was further worsened by the crew's decision to use a high flap setting that increased drag beyond normal two-engine capabilities. The aircraft was one of the first to receive the new avionics and glass flight displays for C-5 Avionics Modernization Program (AMP). This accident led to a redesign of the cockpit engine displays, particularly the visual indicators of a non-active engine. The aircraft was declared a total hull-loss and the airframe was scrapped, but the forward fuselage became a C-5 AMP test bed.

== Aircraft on display ==
- C-5A, AF Ser. No. 70-0451, was delivered to the Travis Air Force Base Heritage Center at Travis Air Force Base for future display. It was the penultimate operational C-5A. The last operational C-5A was delivered to Davis-Monthan Air Force Base for spare parts.
- C-5A, AF Ser. No. 69-0014, is on display at the Air Mobility Command Museum at Dover Air Force Base, Delaware. This is the first C-5 aircraft to go on museum display.

== Specifications (C-5M) ==
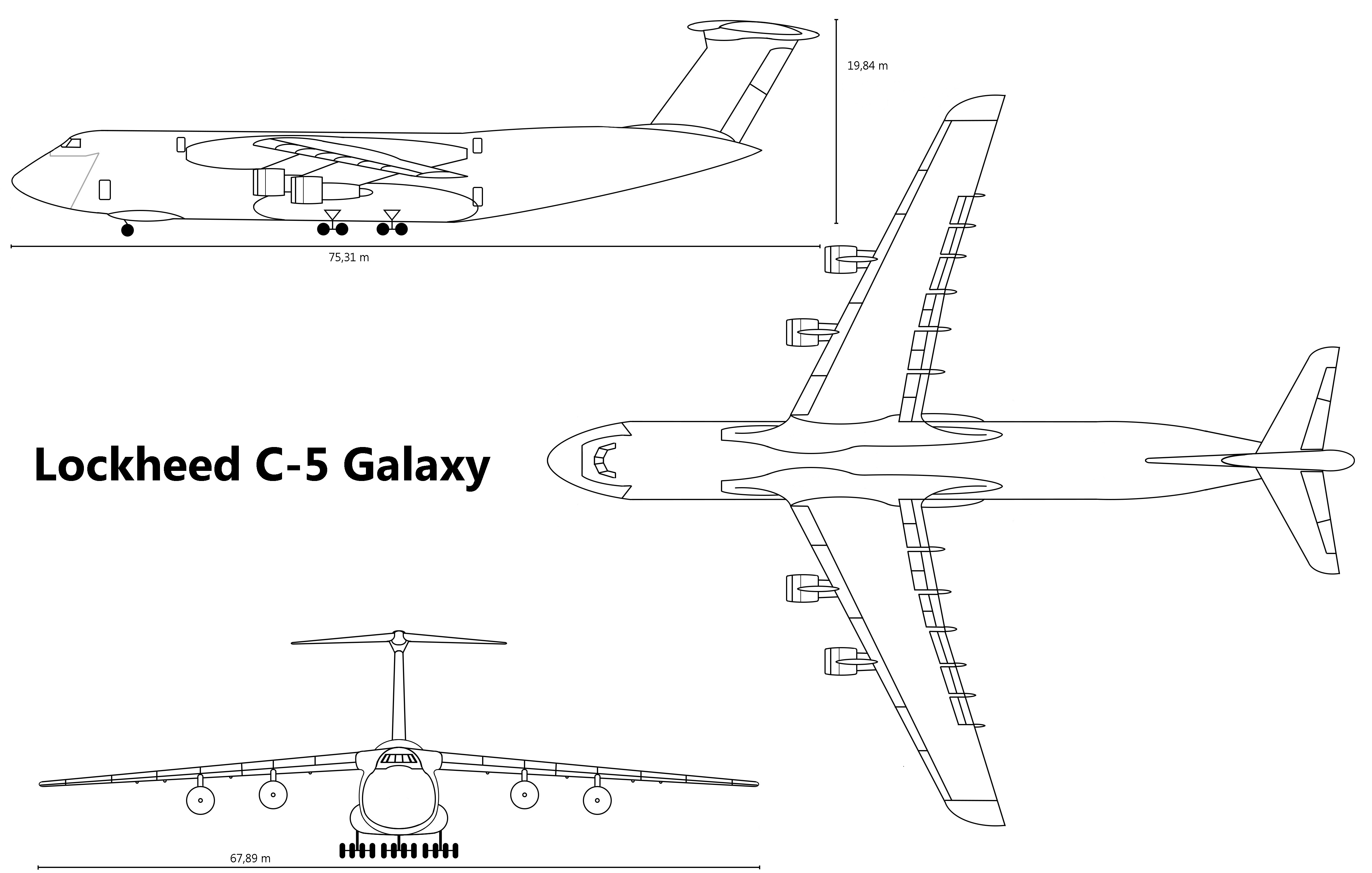
Drawing lines

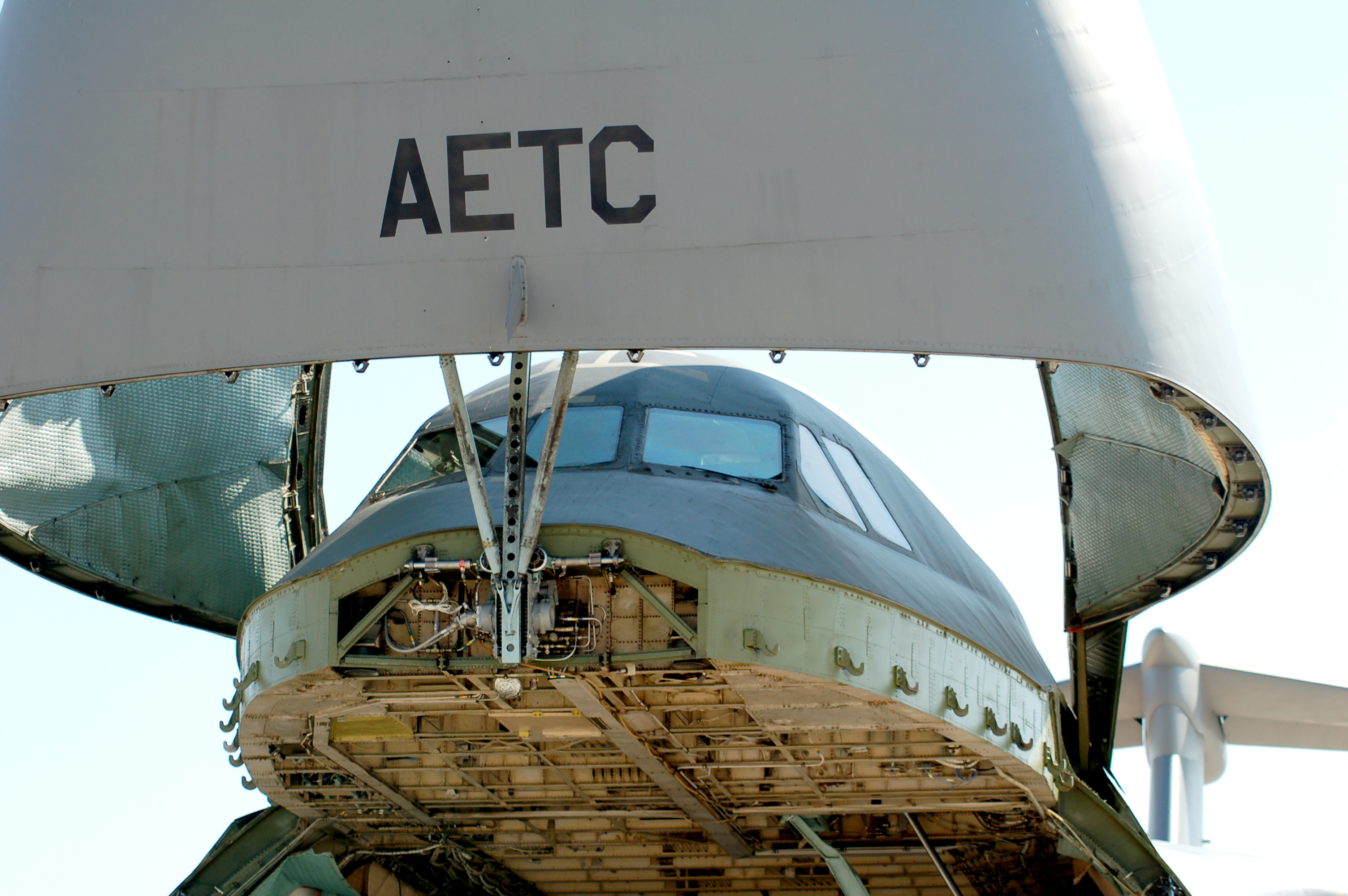
A detail of the C-5's nose assembly raised for loading and unloading

Data from "Quest for Performance", International Directory of Military Aircraft, and USAF fact sheet

General characteristics

- Crew:
  - 7 typical (aircraft commander, first pilot, 2 flight engineers, 3 loadmasters)
  - 4 minimum (pilot, copilot, two flight engineers) (Note: Loadmasters are not needed when flying without cargo.)
  - 8 when augmented (aircraft commander, 2 first pilots, 2 flight engineers, 3 loadmasters)
- Capacity:
  - 36 master pallets 463L or 281,000 lb (127,459 kg)
- Length: 247 ft 1 in (75.31 m)
- Wingspan: 222 ft 9 in (67.89 m)
- Height: 65 ft 1 in (19.84 m)
- Wing area: 6,200 sq ft (580 m^{2})
- Airfoil: root: NACA 0012.41 mod; tip: NACA 0011 mod
- Empty weight: 380,000 lb (172,365 kg)
- Max takeoff weight: 840,000 lb (381,018 kg)
- Fuel capacity: 341,446 lb (154,880 kg); 51,150 US gal (42,590 imp gal; 193,600 L)
- Powerplant: 4 × General Electric F138-100 turbofan engines, 51,000 lbf (230 kN) thrust each

Performance

- Maximum speed: 462 kn (532 mph, 856 km/h)
- Maximum speed: Mach 0.79
- Cruise speed: 450 kn (520 mph, 830 km/h) / Mach 0.77
- Range: 4,800 nmi (5,500 mi, 8,900 km) with a 120,000 lb (54,431 kg) payload, 2,300 nmi (4,260 km; 2,647 mi) at maximum cargo capacity
- Ferry range: 7,000 nmi (8,100 mi, 13,000 km) with no cargo
- Service ceiling: 41,000 ft (12,000 m) at 750,000 lb (340,194 kg)
- Rate of climb: 2,100 ft/min (11 m/s)
- Thrust/weight: 0.26
- Take-off run: 5,400 ft (1,600 m)
- Landing run: 3,600 ft (1,100 m)

== See also ==
Aircraft of comparable role, configuration, and era

- Antonov An-124 Ruslan – Soviet military transport aircraft
- Antonov An-225 Mriya – Soviet/Ukrainian heavy strategic cargo aircraft
- Boeing C-17 Globemaster III – American four engine military transport aircraft
- Boeing 747 – American wide-body four-engined jet long-range aircraft
- Lockheed C-141 Starlifter – Retired American heavy military transport aircraft from Lockheed

Related lists

- List of active United States military aircraft
- List of Lockheed aircraft
