= KCSM =

KCSM may refer to:

- KCSM (FM), a radio station (91.1 FM) licensed to San Mateo, California, United States
- Clinton-Sherman Industrial Airpark, Oklahoma, United States, which has the ICAO airport code KCSM
- KPJK, a television station (channel 60) licensed to San Mateo, California, United States, which used the call sign KCSM-TV from 1964 to 2018
- Kansas City Southern de México, formerly Grupo Transportación Ferroviaria Mexicana, a Mexican railroad subsidiary of Kansas City Southern
