= Clinton-Sherman Air Force Base =

Former United States Air Force Strategic Air Command base

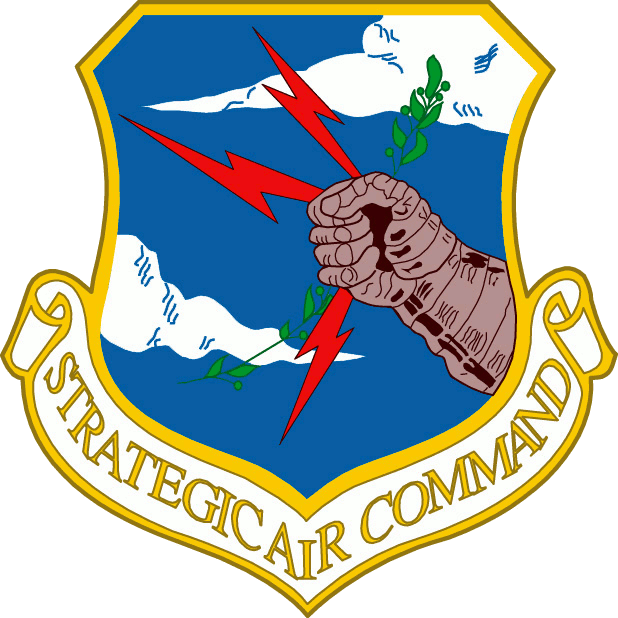
Clinton-Sherman Air Force Base
- Part of Strategic Air Command
- Located near: Burns Flat, Oklahoma
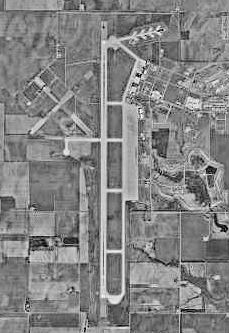
- USGS 1995 Aerial Photo

Site information
- Type: Air Force Base

Location
- Location of Clinton-Sherman Air Force Base, Oklahoma Clinton-Sherman AFB (the United States)
- Coordinates: 35°20′23″N 099°12′02″W

Site history
- Built: 1942
- In use: 1954-1969

Clinton-Sherman Air Force Base (1954–1969) is a former United States Air Force base located near the town of Burns Flat in Washita County, Oklahoma, 15 miles (24 km) southwest of the city of Clinton, Oklahoma. Today it is the site of the Clinton-Sherman Industrial Airpark.

The installation was established in October 1943 as Naval Air Station Clinton and served as a Strategic Air Command (SAC) base from September 1954 to December 1969.

== History ==
In 1942 the Navy Department acquired approximately five thousand acres of Washita County farmland by condemnation for a naval air station. Four 6,000 feet (1,800 m) long runways, three hangars, twenty-four barracks, and numerous temporary facilities soon appeared next to the town of Burns Flat. More than 3,500 officers and enlisted men served with the Special Task Air Groups in the operation of aircraft drones and glider bombs. The depth of this bomber landing pad is approximately 52 feet (16 m).

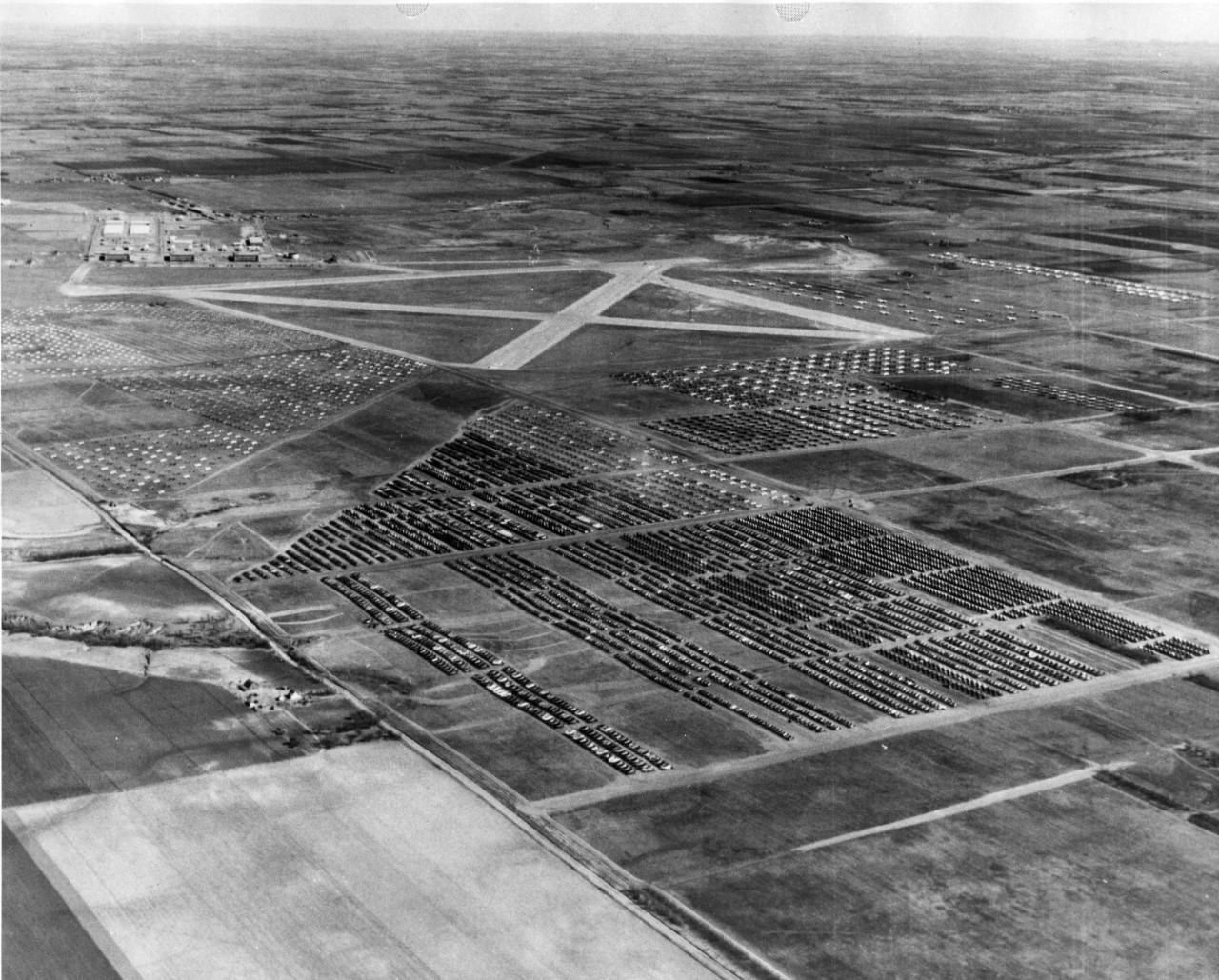
Aerial view of Surplus Aircraft Storage Facility at NAS Clinton, April 1946

After World War II, the air station closed and all facilities transferred to the War Assets Administration. On January 27, 1949, the federal agency conveyed ownership of the entire installation to the city of Clinton, with a recapture clause in case of national emergency. Soon thereafter, the Sherman Iron Works rented space for the salvaging of more than nine thousand surplus military aircraft.

On September 15, 1954, the federal government leased the site from the city of Clinton and began extending one runway that eventually reached a length of 13,502 feet (4,115 m), constructing new facilities, and building nine hundred military family housing units. Reactivated as Clinton-Sherman AFB, the mission of the new SAC airfield was pilot training and developing of specialized aircraft equipment. During the next ten years the Air Force acquired 528 more acres and an additional 3,580 acres of easements.

In March 1959, with a new assignment of B-52s, the 4123d Strategic Wing and its 98th Bombardment Squadron arrived at Clinton-Sherman AFB to conduct a nine-month test of the SAC airborne alert program. The 70th Bombardment Wing, along with its 6th Bombardment Squadron and 902d Air Refueling Squadron, replaced the 4123d on February 1, 1963. With B-52 Stratofortress and KC-135 Stratotanker aircraft, the new units conducted strategic bombardment readiness and training and air refueling readiness, training and support operations to meet Air Force global commitments. For several months in both 1968 and 1969, all wing aircraft, most aircrew and maintenance personnel, and some support personnel were loaned to other SAC units engaged in combat operations in the Far East and Southeast Asia. The 70th Bomb Wing and its components ceased operations and inactivated on December 31, 1969, with Clinton-Sherman AFB concurrently inactivating as a USAF installation.

A KC-135 aircraft and crew from the base were lost in the 1965 USAF KC-135 Wichita crash.

== See also ==
- Oklahoma World War II Army Airfields
