= Burns Flat, Oklahoma =

- Town
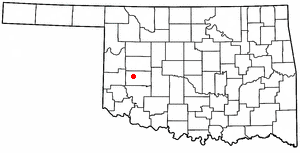
- Location within Oklahoma
- Coordinates: 35°21′17″N 99°10′30″W
- Country: United States
- State: Oklahoma
- County: Washita
- Incorporated: 1955

Government
  - Type: Statutory Town
  - Mayor: Terry Field
  - Administrator: Joel Newberry

Area
  - Total: 0.86 sq mi (2.24 km^{2})
  - Land: 0.86 sq mi (2.24 km^{2})
  - Water: 0 sq mi (0.00 km^{2})
- Elevation: 1,906 ft (581 m)

Population (2020)
  - Total: 1,948
  - Density: 2,250.2/sq mi (868.81/km^{2})
- Time zone: UTC-6 (CST)
  - Summer (DST): UTC-5 (CDT)
- ZIP code: 73624
- Area code: 580
- FIPS code: 40-10250
- GNIS feature ID: 2411747
- Website: BurnsFlatOK.com

Burns Flat is a town in Washita County, Oklahoma, United States. As of the 2020 census, Burns Flat had a population of 1,948.

== History ==
=== Airport ===
Immediately west of Burns Flat is Clinton-Sherman Industrial Airpark which is a licensed spaceport. The facility hosts the third longest civilian runway in North America, stretching approximately 2.5 miles in length.

== Geography ==
According to the United States Census Bureau, the town has a total area of 0.9 square miles (2.3 km^{2}), all land.

== Demographics ==
Historical population
Census	Pop.	Note	%±
1960	2,280		—
1970	988		−56.7%
1980	2,431		146.1%
1990	1,027		−57.8%
2000	1,782		73.5%
2010	2,057		15.4%
2020	1,948		−5.3%
U.S. Decennial Census

=== 2020 census ===
As of the 2020 census, Burns Flat had a population of 1,948. The median age was 30.9 years. 32.9% of residents were under the age of 18 and 12.2% of residents were 65 years of age or older. For every 100 females there were 92.3 males, and for every 100 females age 18 and over there were 86.3 males age 18 and over.

0.0% of residents lived in urban areas, while 100.0% lived in rural areas.

There were 688 households in Burns Flat, of which 40.7% had children under the age of 18 living in them. Of all households, 44.6% were married-couple households, 18.3% were households with a male householder and no spouse or partner present, and 29.2% were households with a female householder and no spouse or partner present. About 23.5% of all households were made up of individuals and 9.8% had someone living alone who was 65 years of age or older.

There were 889 housing units, of which 22.6% were vacant. The homeowner vacancy rate was 2.5% and the rental vacancy rate was 22.5%.

Racial composition as of the 2020 census
Race	Number	Percent
White	1,577	81.0%
Black or African American	44	2.3%
American Indian and Alaska Native	61	3.1%
Asian	10	0.5%
Native Hawaiian and Other Pacific Islander	0	0.0%
Some other race	51	2.6%
Two or more races	205	10.5%
Hispanic or Latino (of any race)	228	11.7%

=== 2010 census ===
As of the census of 2010, there were 2,057 people, 720 households, and 533 families residing in the town. The racial makeup of the town was 82.5% White, 2.3% African American, 3.5% Native American, 0.4% Asian, 0% Pacific Islander, 4.2% from other races, and 7% from two or more races. Hispanic or Latino of any race were 11.8% of the population.

There were 720 households, out of which 45.4% had children under the age of 18 living with them, 49.3% were married couples living together, 17.5% had a female householder with no husband present, and 26% were non-families. 20.4% of all households were made up of individuals, and 6.3% had someone living alone who was 65 years of age or older.

=== 2000 census ===
As of the census of 2000, there were 1,782 people, 622 households, and 480 families residing in the town. The population density was 2,062.9 inhabitants per square mile (796.5/km^{2}). There were 903 housing units at an average density of 1,045.4 per square mile (403.6/km^{2}). The racial makeup of the town was 88.55% White, 1.35% African American, 3.93% Native American, 6.8% Asian, 0.17% Pacific Islander, 2.81% from other races, and 2.30% from two or more races. Hispanic or Latino of any race were 6.00% of the population.

There were 622 households, out of which 46.3% had children under the age of 18 living with them, 61.1% were married couples living together, 13.7% had a female householder with no husband present, and 22.8% were non-families. 20.1% of all households were made up of individuals, and 7.9% had someone living alone who was 65 years of age or older. The average household size was 2.86 and the average family size was 3.32.

In the town, the population was spread out, with 34.3% under the age of 18, 9.3% from 18 to 24, 28.6% from 25 to 44, 19.7% from 45 to 64, and 8.1% who were 65 years of age or older. The median age was 30 years. For every 100 females, there were 90.8 males. For every 100 females age 18 and over, there were 86.6 males.

The median income for a household in the town was $32,353, and the median income for a family was $35,870. Males had a median income of $30,278 versus $17,625 for females. The per capita income for the town was $14,350. 15.6% of the population and 14.1% of families were below the poverty line. Out of the total people living in poverty, 22.4% were under the age of 18 and 13.9% were 65 or older.

== Education ==
Burns Flat hosts the Burns Flat-Dill City School District with K-12 education. Technical training and educational programs are offered at Western Technology Center's main campus in Burns Flat.

== Climate ==
Climate data for Burns Flat, Oklahoma
Month	Jan	Feb	Mar	Apr	May	Jun	Jul	Aug	Sep	Oct	Nov	Dec	Year
Mean daily maximum °F (°C)	44 (7)	48 (9)	59 (15)	71 (22)	78 (26)	86 (30)	91 (33)	89 (32)	80 (27)	71 (22)	59 (15)	46 (8)	69 (21)
Mean daily minimum °F (°C)	24 (−4)	28 (−2)	35 (2)	48 (9)	57 (14)	66 (19)	69 (21)	68 (20)	60 (16)	50 (10)	37 (3)	30 (−1)	48 (9)
Average precipitation inches (mm)	0.7 (18)	1.0 (25)	1.3 (33)	2.1 (53)	4.1 (100)	3.8 (97)	2.8 (71)	3.1 (79)	3.7 (94)	2.5 (64)	1.4 (36)	1.2 (30)	27.7 (700)
Source: Weatherbase.com
