= Infinity One Oklahoma Spaceport =

Airport in the United States

Coordinates: 35°20′23″N 099°12′02″W

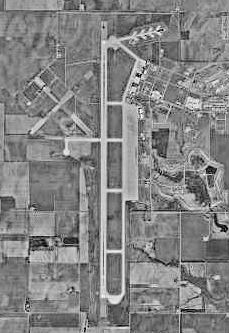

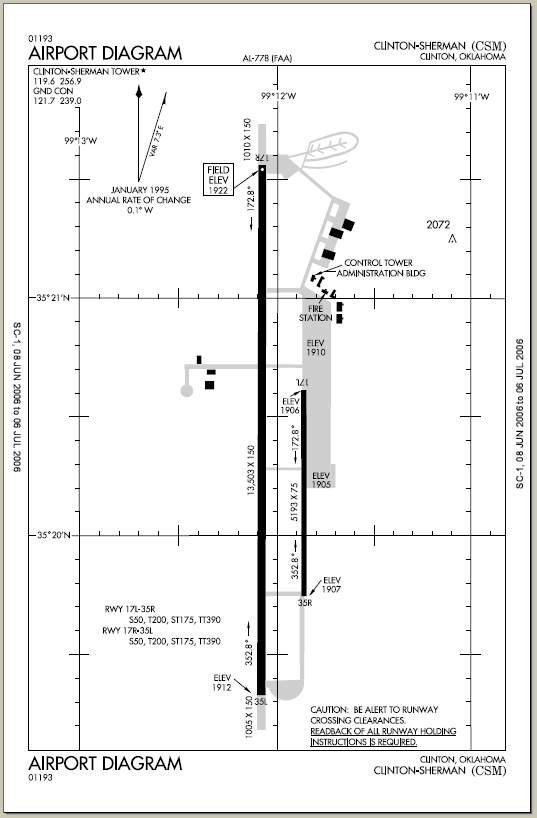
- Airfield diagram from Federal Aviation Administration
- IATA: CSM; ICAO: KCSM; FAA LID: CSM

Summary
- Airport type: Public
- Owner: Oklahoma Space Industry Development Authority
- Serves: Clinton, Oklahoma
- Location: Burns Flat, Oklahoma
- Elevation AMSL: 1,922 ft (586 m)
- Interactive map of Infinity One Oklahoma Spaceport

Runways
Direction	Length		Surface
Direction	ft	m	Surface
17R/35L	13,503	4,116	Concrete
17L/35R	5,193	1,583	Concrete

Statistics (2006)
- Aircraft operations: 49,500
- Source: Federal Aviation Administration

For the military use of the facility before 1969 see Clinton-Sherman Air Force Base

The Infinity One Oklahoma Spaceport, previously known as the Clinton-Sherman Industrial Airpark or the Oklahoma Air & Space Port is an airport and spaceport in Washita County, Oklahoma, near the town of Burns Flat. The Federal Aviation Administration (FAA) granted a license to the site in June 2006 to the Oklahoma Space Industry Development Authority (OSIDA) to "oversee the takeoff and landing of suborbital, reusable launch vehicles." It also boasts the first space flight corridor, "The Infinity One"—which is about 152 miles long and averages about 50 miles wide—that is not in restricted airspace and does not interfere with Military Operations Areas (MOAs). The facility is an FAA licensed launch site, one of only 12 in the U.S. Individual operators must also secure a separate license in order to make space flights from the facility.

== Facilities ==
The airpark is at the site of a public airfield known as Clinton-Sherman Airport (IATA: CSM, ICAO: KCSM). The airport covers an area of 1,690 acres (680 ha) which contains two concrete paved runways: 17R/35L measuring 13,503 x 300 ft (91 m) with 1,000-foot overruns at each end for a total of 15,503 (4725.3 meters) and 17L/35R measuring 5,193 x 75 ft. (1,583 x 23 m). The larger of these is the fourth-largest concrete civilian runway in North America, which is a major benefit for use as a spaceport.

For the 12-month period ending June 30, 2020, the airport is on track for 30,000 aircraft operations, an average of 82 per day: 90% military and 10% general aviation.

The location is a 2,700 acre (10.8 km^{2}) facility located near transportation corridors such as Interstate 35 and Interstate 40. There are 96 acres (384,000 m^{2}) of parking space able to support large commercial aircraft. There are six commercial aircraft hangars and a 50,000 square-foot (4,500 m^{2}) manufacturing facility with loading docks adjacent to a railway spur.

== History ==
The facility operated for a number years as part of the United States Navy and United States Air Force. Closed under the name Clinton-Sherman Air Force Base, the facility has been redeveloped over the years to its present form.

The location of the former naval air station World War II runways to the north and west of the main runway are still visible on aerial photographs of the airport; however they are not usable.

On April 14, 2026, the Oklahoma Space Industry Development Authority announced that the name of the facility was changed to be the "Infinity One Oklahoma Spaceport", to reflect that the spaceport was the first inland spaceport to receive a license by the FAA. The Oklahoma Department of Aerospace and Aeronautics considers the facility one of the three cornerstones (along with Oklahoma City and Tulsa) of the emerging “Oklahoma Space Triangle.”

== Operations ==
On June 12, 2025, the OSIDA announced Dawn Aerospace had selected this airfield as its Aurora spaceplane home base. In October 2026, construction began on a mission control and operations center of 5,000 square feet (460 m^{2}), together with a hanger of 10,000 square feet (930 m^{2}) to house the spaceplanes. Operations of the rocket-powered, remotely piloted aircraft are expected as early as 2027.

Premium Aerospace said in October 2022 that it would be investing $120 million over the next several years to move to the airpark. The project includes renovating and expanding two existing hangars, and constructing a third. Phase I was completed October 9, 2025 with the official opening of the Premium Aerospace Center Oklahoma LLC (“PAC”) Hanger 234, which includes 20,000 square feet (1,900 m^{2}) of hanger space and 8,000 square feet (740 m^{2}) of office space. At that time, Phase II, with a budget of $60 million, was expected to be completed in 2026. The company does MRO work (maintenance, repair and operations/overhaul) on 737 and larger aircraft.

Large aerospace companies are attracted to the site not only because of the length and size of the runway, but also the fact that there are no obstructions around either end. Boeing in 2013 used the facility for testing an autonomous landing system for the 737, and in 2015 for proficiency training and flight testing with the Boeing 747-8. In March 2025, a Boeing 777X arrived for certification testing on its braking system. Cessna and Honda Aircraft have also been customers.

Branches of the Department of Defense—primarily the U.S. Air Force and the Navy—use the airport for the flight training of their aircrews.

Armadillo Aerospace conducted flight test activities at the Oklahoma Spaceport in 2004 through 2009, including tests of a VTVL Lander and a Rocket Racer for the now-defunct Rocket Racing League.

One company, Rocketplane Kistler, formerly based in Oklahoma, had plans to build and operate a suborbital spacecraft, the Rocketplane XP, but filed for bankruptcy in 2010 without having successfully launched a flight.

The former northeast 'alert pads' and ready facility of the former Strategic Air Command base currently houses the Law Enforcement Driver Training Center of the Oklahoma Highway Patrol, Oklahoma Department of Public Safety. Currently referred to as 'Building 120', the former bunker facility houses OHP Academy staff and cadets during the driving training portion of 'Patrol Schools'. The annual 'Cadet Lawman Academy' (sponsored by the OSTA, Elks Lodge, and C.U.D.D.), is also located at the same facility during the summer, which provides a 1-week program for high school students. The surrounding facility and tarmac incorporates over 12 miles of various roadways and courses, used for precision driving and emergency vehicle operation training. This facility is recognized as one of the top ranked law enforcement driver training centers in the country, according to the Federal Law Enforcement Training Center.

== See also ==
- List of airports in Oklahoma
