= VPB-11 =

Patrol Bombing Squadron 11
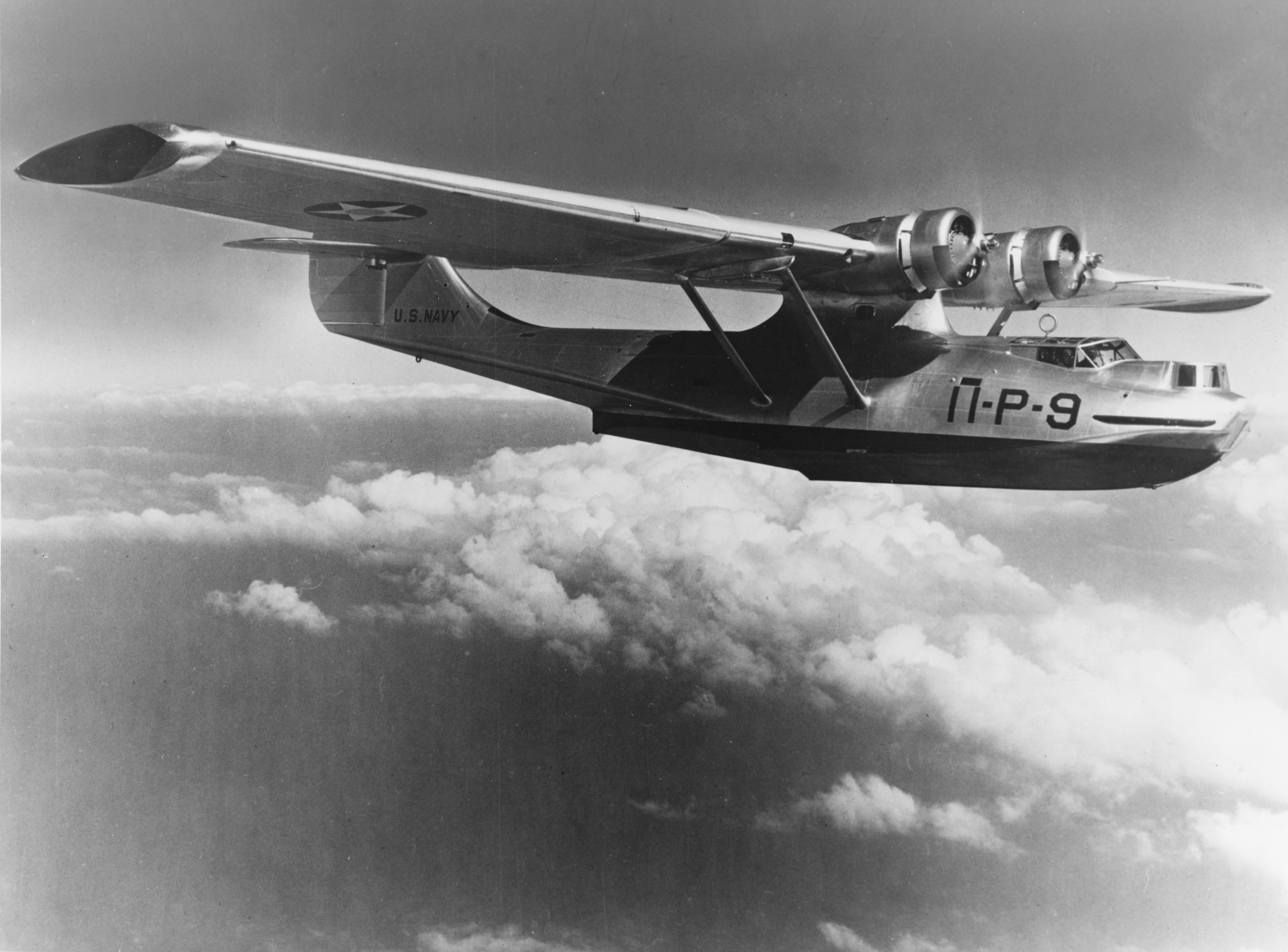
- VP-11 PBY-1 c.1938
- Active: 7 February 1924 – 20 June 1945
- Country: United States of America
- Branch: United States Navy
- Type: squadron
- Role: Maritime patrol
- Engagements: World War II

Aircraft flown
- Patrol: DT-2; SC-1/2; T3M-2; T4M-1; T2D-1; PM-1/PD-1; PBY-1/5

VPB-11 was a Patrol Bombing Squadron of the U.S. Navy. The squadron was established as Torpedo & Bombing Squadron 19-D14 (VT-19D14) on 7 February 1924, redesignated Torpedo & Bombing Squadron 6D14 (VT-6D14) on 1 July 1927, redesignated Patrol Squadron 6-B (VP-6B) on 1 April 1931, redesignated Patrol Squadron 6-F (VP-6F) on 17 July 1933, redesignated Patrol Squadron 6 (VP-6) on 1 October 1937, redesignated Patrol Squadron 23 (VP-23) on 1 July 1939, redesignated Patrol Squadron 11 (VP-11) on 1 August 1941, redesignated Patrol Bombing Squadron 11 (VPB-11) on 1 October 1944 and disestablished on 20 June 1945.

== Operational history ==
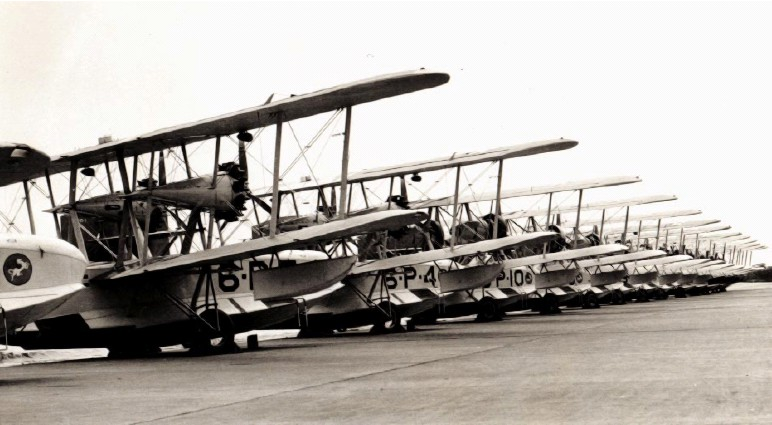
VP-6F PD-1s at Ford Island in 1934

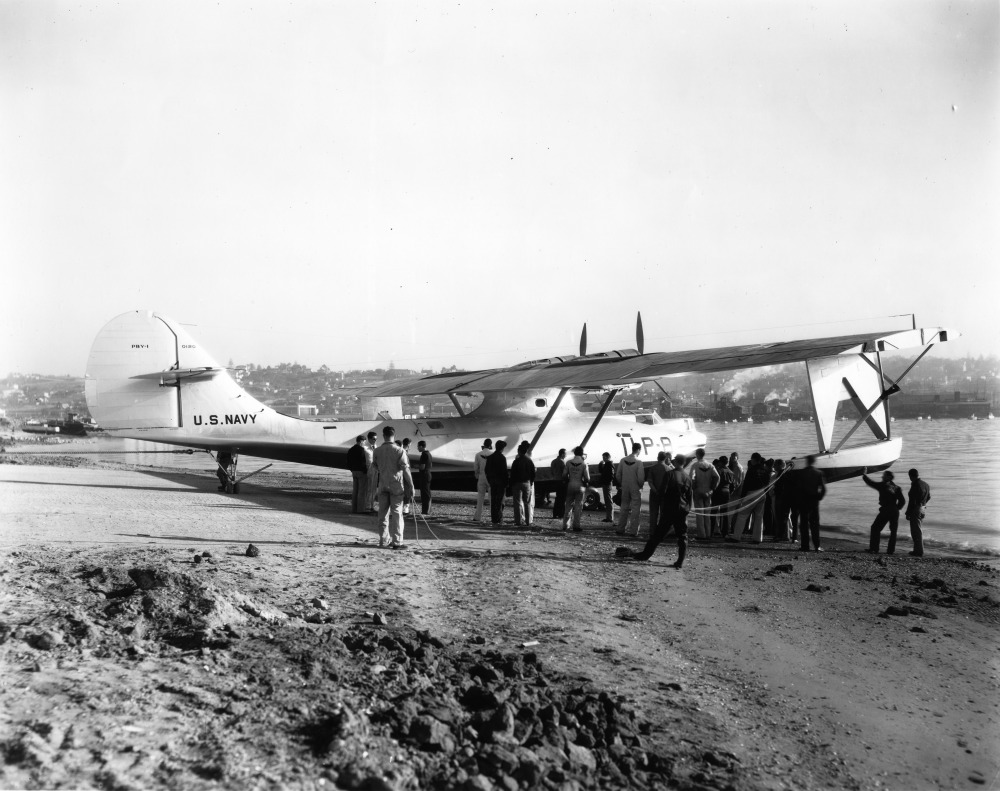
VP-11 PBY-1 at San Diego

- 7 February 1924: VT-19 was established as a torpedo squadron based at NAS Ford Island, Pearl Harbor, Hawaii, flying 13 DT-2 aircraft.
- 25 April 1925: Several of the squadron’s pilots made the first successful night landings on an aircraft carrier under way. The landings, made under varying lighting and weather conditions, were part of a program to determine the feasibility of night landings on an aircraft carrier as a military operation.
- 9 April 1927: VT-19 was redesignated VT-6D14 during the reorganization of squadrons by BuAer in 1927. The D14 represented the 14th Naval District, Pearl Harbor.
- 1 July 1927: The squadron’s DT-2 type aircraft were declared obsolete and were replaced by SC-2 aircraft.
- 21 January 1931: VT-6D14 was redesignated VP-6B, converting from torpedo bomber squadron to patrol squadron under Fleet Aviation, Base Force, Commander Minecraft, Battle Force. Although officially a patrol squadron, the 12 aircraft assigned were T3M-2 torpedo bombers. USS Pelican and USS Avocet were assigned to provide tender support.
- 17 July 1933: VP-6B was redesignated VP-6F, reflecting the change in organization at Pearl Harbor to Commander Aircraft, Base Force, Fleet Air Base. The squadron had transitioned to the T4M-1 and the T2D-1, both with twin floats.
- 1933: VP-6F transitioned from floatplanes to seaplanes, operating from FAB Pearl Harbor with six PM-1 and six PD-1 seaplanes.
- 22 April 1935: VP-6F, along with VPs 1F, 4F, 7F, 8F, 9F and 10F, participated in Fleet Problem XVI off Midway Island. The intent of the exercise was to give elements of the fleet an opportunity to become familiar with Midway and adjacent waters while practicing landing operations. Both the Army and Coast Guard took part in the problem. The exercises were marred by a series of crashes, two from VP-6F resulting in 12 deaths, and numerous instances of aircraft being forced down by mechanical difficulties and sinking (no casualties). The tenders supporting the fleet were found to be so slow that they had to be sent ahead of the main body so as not to delay the exercises.
- 1937: VP-6F transitioned to the PBY-1 Catalina seaplane, giving the squadron for the first time an aircraft that was both reliable and with long enough range to adequately support the fleet from either tenders or advanced bases. The Catalina was already obsolete by the start of WWII, but was used by the navies of several nations throughout the war in large numbers in a wide variety of roles ranging from Anti-submarine warfare (ASW) to air and sea rescue work.
- 1 October 1937: VP-6F was reorganized under Commander, Patrol Wing TWO, Pearl Harbor, Hawaii.
- 1 July 1939: VP-6F was redesignated VP-23, under Patrol Wing TWO, Pearl Harbor, Hawaii. The squadron continued to fly the older PBY-1 seaplanes, and had been assigned to USS Childs for tender support.
- 9 April 1940: PatWing TWO aircraft of VPs 21, 22, 23, 24, 25 and 26 participated in Fleet Problem XXI with the Army 72nd Bombardment Squadron and the 4th Reconnaissance Squadron. The combined squadrons defended the Hawaiian Islands against a carrier attack. The exercise revealed glaring deficiencies in the coordination between the air arms in defense of the islands.
- 1 July 1941: VP-23 was redesignated VP-11, still flying the PBY-1 and at that time operating from NAS Kaneohe Bay, Hawaii. During this period the squadron began search and reconnaissance in the central Pacific from NAS Kaneohe Bay and tender-supported locations near Johnston Atoll.
- 3 October 1941: Aircrews of VP-11 undertook a ferry flight from NAS Kaneohe Bay to NAS San Diego, California, NAS Jacksonville, Florida and NAS Corpus Christi, Texas, returning on 22 October 1941 with new PBY-5 aircraft.
- 7 December 1941: During the Attack on Pearl Harbor the majority of the squadron’s aircraft at NAS Kaneohe Bay were destroyed or damaged beyond repair.
- 1 April 1942: Losses were replaced in April with new PBY-5 seaplanes from the U.S., equipped with ASE radar for spotting ships on the ocean surface. Sector searches around Oahu were begun as soon as crews could be checked out on the new equipment.
- 30 April 1942: A two-aircraft detachment was sent to Johnston Atoll for sector searches. Two new crews relieved the detachment each week. On 29 May the detachment size was increased to six aircraft.
- 20 May 1942: A three-plane detachment was sent to Barking Sands, Kauai. On 22 May the detachment was increased by three aircraft.
- 1 July 1942: VP-11 deployed to Suva, Fiji Islands. Over the next several months the squadron would be moved from Suva to Nouméa, New Caledonia, Tongatapu and Espiritu Santo to conduct search and reconnaissance missions in connection with the landings at Guadalcanal and other fleet operations in the South Pacific.
- 13 July 1942: A three-plane detachment was sent to Nouméa.
- 17 July 1942: One aircraft was dispatched to Auckland, returning on 19 July.
- 26 July 1942: A three-plane detachment was sent to Tongatapu, with two aircraft returning to Suva on 28 July.
- 1 August 1942: The Nouméa detachment was increased by three aircraft. Tender support was provided by USS Curtiss. The next day the detachment was further supplemented by two aircraft from VP-14.
- 4 August 1942: VP-11 headquarters was shifted from Suva to Saweni Beach with six aircraft, the remainder still based at Nouméa. The headquarters group was provided tender support by USS McFarland.
- 11 Aug 1942: The Nouméa detachment was redeployed with USS Curtiss to Espiritu Santo, New Hebrides.
- 7 September 1942: VP-11 claimed one submarine kill, but a postwar review of Japanese records indicates no loss of a Japanese submarine on that date and location.
- 29 October 1942: Lieutenant F. Joe Hill and his crew spotted a surfaced submarine about three miles off his starboard beam. The submarine crash-dived and was below the surface when Hill dropped his two 650-pound Depth charges. A large quantity of oil appeared and remained on the surface the following day. Postwar records indicate the submarine sunk by Lieutenant Hill was I-172, which was lost with all 91 hands aboard, including Rear Admiral Yoshisuke Okamoto, Commander of the 12th Squadron of the Kure Submarine Flotilla.
- 5 November 1942: VP-11 claimed a third submarine sunk, but a postwar review of Japanese records indicates no loss of a Japanese submarine on that date and location.
- 1 February 1943: VP-11 was withdrawn from combat and returned to NAS San Diego for refit and home leave.
- 20 April 1943: The reforming of the squadron was completed on this date. Aircrews flew the trans-Pacific to NAS Kaneohe Bay on 21 April, while the remainder of ground personnel and assets departed on transports. Upon arrival all hands undertook intensive combat preparation while simultaneously conducting patrols over the ocean in the Hawaiian area.
- 22 May 1943: Combat training was completed at NAS Kaneohe Bay. VP-11 aircrews departed for Seaplane Base Nedlands, Perth, Australia, followed later by ground crew and squadron assets in transports. Upon arrival in Perth on 8 June aircrews commenced combat search and reconnaissance patrols in the southwest Pacific under the operational control of FAW-10.
- 9 September 1943: VP-11 departed for Brisbane, and then to New Guinea and Palm Island. The squadron came under the operational control of FAW-17 and relieved VP-101. Black Cat (PBY’s painted black) nighttime operations commenced in the areas around New Guinea, New Ireland, and the Bismarck Sea.
- 1 October – 19 November 1943: VP-11 was based aboard USS San Pablo in Jenkins Bay. Night searches for surface ships were conducted, and bombing attacks on Japanese installations on Garove Island were conducted over several nights. On 9 October, USS Half Moon relieved USS San Pablo.
- 16 November 1943: Lieutenant Jack D. Cruze and his crew located a Japanese task force. Despite the heavy concentration of fire from the escorts, Cruze made a low-level bombing attack that destroyed a large transport in the task force. For his courage under fire and aggressive pursuit of the enemy during this period, Lieutenant Cruze was awarded the Navy Cross.
- 19 November 1943: VP-11, relieved at Jenkins Bay by VP-52, reported to Port Moresby to relieve VP-101. On 23 November Black Cat operations were commenced in conjunction with daytime attacks by the USAAF 5th Bombardment Group.
- 30 December 1943: VP-11 transferred to Palm Island, Australia, and was taken off combat operations. Routine administrative and passenger flights were conducted daily to Port Moresby, Samari and Brisbane.
- 10 February 1944: The squadron returned to Perth to conduct convoy patrols in Australian waters under the operational control of FAW-10.
- 19 July 1944: VP-11 returned to New Guinea and Schouten Islands for Black Cat night combat operations under the operational control of FAW-17. A three-aircraft detachment was sent to Woendi Lagoon, Biak.
- 23 August 1944: VP-11 continued to conduct Black Cat operations after its transfer to Middleburg Island.
- 18 September 1944: The squadron continued Black Cat operations while based on Schouten Island and Morotai until 21 September when daytime operations were then started. Daytime operations consisted of ASW patrols and air-sea rescue missions in the South Pacific.
- 1 October 1944: VP-11 was redesignated VPB-11. On 6 October the squadron was stationed at Morotai with tender support provided by USS San Pablo. Air-sea rescue and routine ASW patrols were conducted daily. On 12 October half of the squadron was quartered aboard USS Orca to provide more room for the crews.
- 14 November 1944: The squadron was relocated to Woendi with 15 aircraft. On 5 December VPB-11 was moved to Morotai, then back to Woendi on the 11th for boarding on USS Pocomoke and transportation back to the U.S.
- 19 December 1944: VPB-11 was officially withdrawn from combat and 15 aircraft and crews departed Woendi for return to NAS San Diego.
- 20 June 1945: VPB-11 was disestablished at NAS San Diego.

== Aircraft assignments ==
The squadron was assigned the following aircraft, effective on the dates shown:

- DT-2 – February 1924
- SC-1/2 – July 1927
- T3M-2 – June 1929
- T4M-1 – September 1931
- T2D-1 – January 1932
- PM-1 – 1933
- PD-1 – 1933
- PBY-1 – 1937
- PBY-5 – November 1941

== Home port assignments ==
The squadron was assigned to these home ports, effective on the dates shown:

- Pearl Harbor, Hawaii – 7 February 1924
- NAS Kaneohe Bay, Hawaii – 1940
- NAS San Diego, California – February 1943
- NAS Kaneohe Bay – April 1943
- NAS San Diego – December 1944

== See also ==
- Maritime patrol aircraft
- List of inactive United States Navy aircraft squadrons
- List of United States Navy aircraft squadrons
- List of squadrons in the Dictionary of American Naval Aviation Squadrons
- History of the United States Navy
