= VP-22 =

Patrol Squadron 22
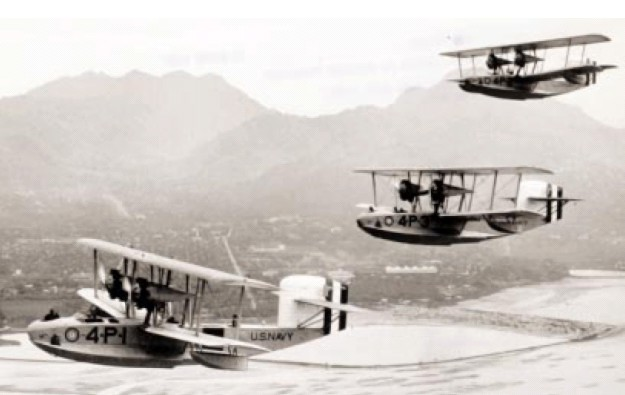
- VP-4D-14 PD-1s over Hawaii in March 1930
- Active: 15 September 1928 – 18 April 1942
- Country: United States of America
- Branch: United States Navy
- Type: squadron
- Role: Maritime patrol
- Engagements: World War II

Aircraft flown
- Patrol: H-16; T2D; PD-1; P2Y-3; PBY-1/2/3/5

VP-22 was a Patrol Squadron of the U.S. Navy. The squadron was established as Patrol Squadron 4D-14 (VP-4D14) on 15 September 1928, redesignated Patrol Squadron 4-B (VP-4B) on 21 January 1931, redesignated Patrol Squadron 4-F (VP-4F) on 17 July 1933, redesignated Patrol Squadron 4 (VP-4) on 1 October 1937, redesignated Patrol Squadron 22 (VP-22) on 1 July 1939 and disestablished on 18 April 1942, with the squadron assets merged with VP-101.

== Operational history ==
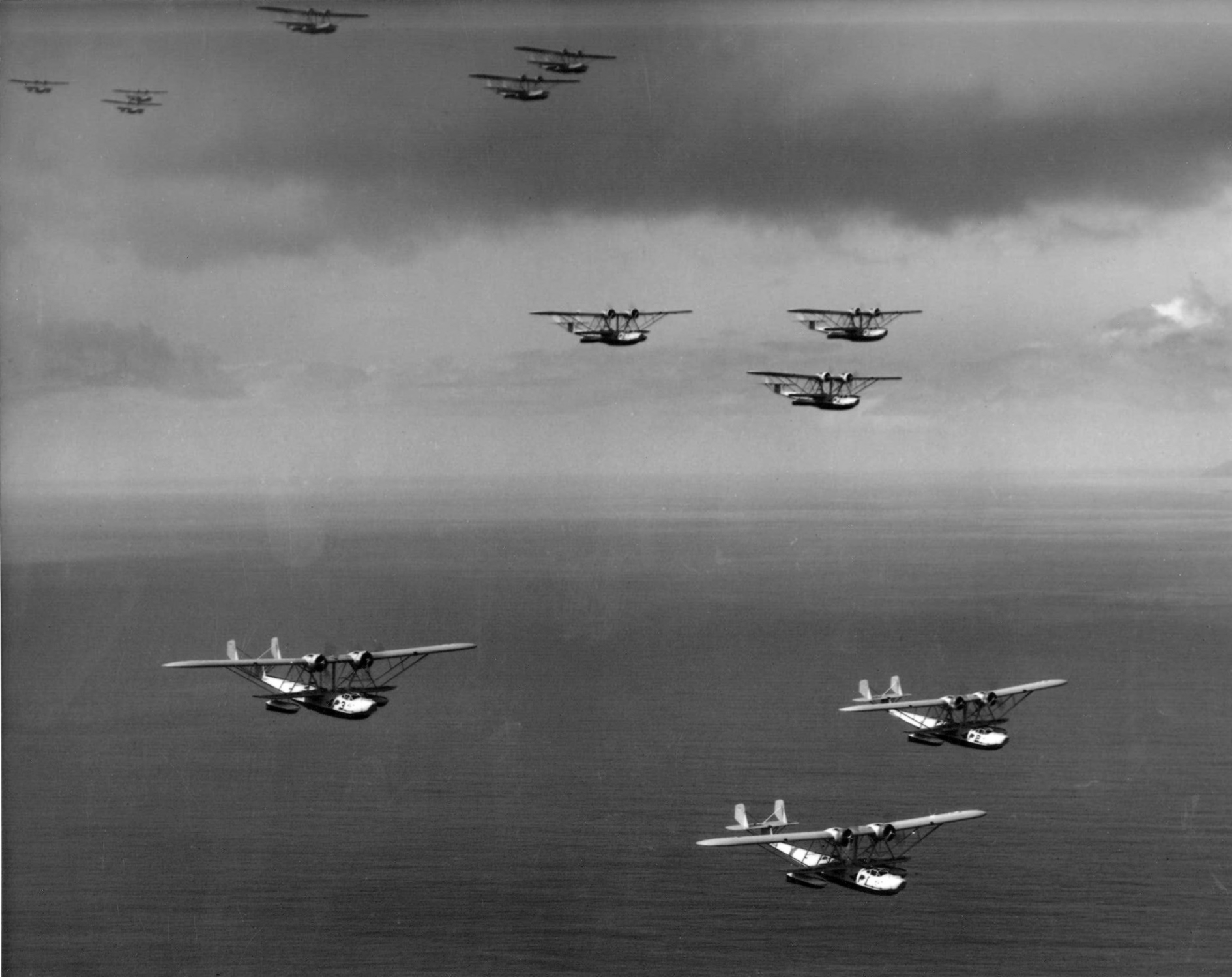
VP-4F P2Y-3s in 1935

- 15 September 1928: VP-4D14 established at NAS Pearl Harbor, Hawaii, with the D14 representing the 14th Naval District. The squadron began operations with six H-16 seaplanes. Primary mission of the squadron was patrol and bombing in connection with the plan of defense for the Hawaiian Islands.
- 20 February 1929: Mechanics from the Wright Aeronautical Corporation arrived to begin alterations on the engines of the H-16 and new T2D aircraft.
- 28 February 1930: The first PD-1 aircraft was received by the squadron for testing to evaluate its operational capability. Results of the tests were very favorable, with transition training rapidly bringing the squadron complement up to 12 PD-1 seaplanes.
- 8 March 1930: A flight of three VP-4D14 aircraft from NAS Barbers Point, Hawaii, to Nawiliwili, Hawaii, set a record time of 42 minutes, proving the worth of the PD-1 as an operational aircraft.
- 14 May 1930: VP-4D14 provided an escort for 44 United States Army Air Corps aircraft in transit from Pearl Harbor, Hawaii, to the island of Maui, Hawaii. During the flight one Keystone bomber went down in mid-channel. Lieutenant Schur landed his PD-1 next to the sinking bomber and rescued the crew, but was unable to take off again due to high waves and overloading. Both aircrews were rescued by SS Hawaii at sunset, leaving the seaplane in a sinking condition.
- 14 September 1930: VP-4D14, VP-1D14 and VJ6D14 departed Pearl Harbor for Hilo in company with USS Pelican for tests of advanced base operations and extended operations from a tender, including the servicing of the PD-1 while afloat.
- 9 January 1931: A flight of nine squadron aircraft made the first nonstop circumnavigation of the Hawaiian Islands, completing a distance of 850 miles (1,370 km) in 12 hours.
- 21 January 1931: VP-4D14 was redesignated VP-4B when realigned by Chief of Naval Operations (CNO) from the 14th Naval District to Fleet Aviation, Battle Force, Minecraft at NAS Pearl Harbor, Hawaii.
- 26 April 1931: VP-4B was forced to reduce its flying to a minimum, since half the engines available for squadron aircraft had reached the 250-hour mark and needed replacing or rebuilding. No replacements were available in the inventory for several months.
- 17 July 1933: VP-4B was redesignated VP-4F when realigned by CNO from Battle Force to Base Force. The squadron at this time was composed of 12 PD-1 aircraft, supported by tenders USS Pelican and USS Avocet.
- 22 April 1935: VP-4F, with VP-1F and VP-6F from Pearl Harbor, Hawaii; VP-8F and VP-10F from NAS San Diego, California; and VP-7F and VP-9F from NAF Coco Solo, Panama Canal Zone, participated in Fleet Problem XVI in Hawaiian waters.
- 28 May 1935: VP-4F was realigned organizationally when patrol squadrons were placed under Patrol Wings, Base Force. VPs 1F, 4F, 6F, 8F, 10F, 16F and 17F came under PatWing-2 at FAB Pearl Harbor.
- 1 October 1937: VP-4F was redesignated VP-4 when patrol squadrons were reorganized under Commander, Air Scouting Force, Patrol Wings. VPs 1, 4, 6, 8 and 10 were based at FAB Pearl Harbor, Hawaii, under PatWing-2 and supported by USS Swan, USS Pelican and USS Avocet.
- 25 March 1938: The squadron, along with VPs 1, 6, 8, 10 and 18 participated in Fleet Problem XIX (Phase V) as part of Red Force. During "attacks" on Blue Force the vulnerability of the slow-moving patrol aircraft became apparent when the majority were judged shot down in the face of strong anti-aircraft (AA) fire from the defending force. The squadrons were flying P2Y-3 and PBY-1 aircraft. VP-4 had just transitioned to the PBY-1 from the P2Y-3, and the fleet exercise was its first operational test.
- June–August 1938: VP-4 spent three months transitioning into newer model Catalinas, the PBY-2 and PBY-3.
- 9 April 1940: The squadron, along with VPs 21, 23, 24, 25 and 26 participated in Fleet Problem XXI in cooperation with the Army 72nd Bombardment Squadron and the 4th Reconnaissance Squadron, defending the Hawaiian Islands against carrier attack. The exercise pointed out serious problems that existed in the coordination between air arms in defense of the islands. VP-22 had by this date transitioned to the PBY-5 flying boat.
- 7 December 1941: VP-22 was caught on the ground during the Japanese Attack on Pearl Harbor and all its aircraft destroyed.
- 11–20 January 1942: After receiving 12 replacement PBY-5 aircraft ferried in by VP-51 from Atlantic bases, VP-22 joined PatWing-10 at Ambon Island, Dutch East Indies. Unfortunately, the PBY-5 aircraft they received were the early models without self-sealing fuel tanks and armor. PatWing-10 later received five newer model PBY-5 Catalinas from the Dutch in Java. All of the rest of the PatWing’s original aircraft were the older PBY-4 models. The VP-22 aircraft were the first aviation reinforcements of the U.S. Navy in the Central Pacific to oppose the Japanese advance in the East Indies. Lieutenant Thomas Moorer, later CNO, was VP-22’s engineering officer. Almost immediately after arrival several of the VP-22 Catalinas were caught at anchor at Ambon and destroyed. A few days later, Ensign Jack L. Grayson and crew were shot down in aircraft 22-P-6 near Magole Island. They made it to shore in five days and were picked up by a VP-22 aircraft on 20 January 1942.
- 5 February 1942: VP-22 flew to Naval Base Darwin, Australia, and patrolled from that location, tender support provided by USS William B. Preston.
- 19–23 February 1942: Lieutenant Moorer and his crew, while on a patrol mission, were shot down by Japanese fighters en route to an attack on Darwin. None of the crew were seriously wounded and all were picked up shortly after by an American tramp steamer, Florence D.. That same afternoon Japanese dive-bombers sank the steamer, killing two of Moorer’s crew. The survivors made Bathurst Island that night, and all were picked up on the 23rd by HMAS Warrnambool for return to Darwin.
- 25 February 1942: By this date, VP-22 had lost all but three of its aircraft to enemy action and only two of the remainder were in serviceable condition.
- 1 March 1942: Surabaya was evacuated in the face of the advancing Japanese, and the squadron was relocated to Perth, Australia.
- 5 March 1942: It was decided at this time to return half of the squadron personnel to the U.S. That contingent departed Freemantle aboard transport USS Mount Vernon bound for San Francisco, California.
- 18 April 1942: VP-22 was officially disestablished and its assets merged with those of VP-101.

== Aircraft assignments ==
The squadron was assigned the following aircraft, effective on the dates shown:

- H-16 - September 1928
- T2D - September 1928
- PD-1 - February 1930
- P2Y-3 - July 1935
- PBY-1 - March 1938
- PBY-2 - June 1938
- PBY-3 - October 1938
- PBY-5 - Apr 1940

== Home port assignments ==
The squadron was assigned to these home ports, effective on the dates shown:

- NAS Pearl Harbor, Hawaii - 15 September 1928

== See also ==
- Maritime patrol aircraft
- List of inactive United States Navy aircraft squadrons
- List of United States Navy aircraft squadrons
- List of squadrons in the Dictionary of American Naval Aviation Squadrons
- History of the United States Navy
