= VPB-29 =

Patrol Bombing Squadron 29
- Active: 17 January 1923 – 20 June 1945
- Country: United States of America
- Branch: United States Navy
- Type: squadron
- Role: Maritime patrol
- Engagements: World War II

Aircraft flown
- Patrol: F-5L; DT; H-16; T2D-1; PK-1; P2Y-3; PBY-4/5

VPB-29 was a Patrol Bombing Squadron of the U.S. Navy. The squadron was established as Pacific Air Detachment on 17 January 1923, redesignated Patrol Squadron 14 (VP-14) on 29 May 1924, redesignated Patrol Squadron 1-Naval District 14 (VP-1D14) on 21 September 1927, redesignated Patrol Squadron 1-B (VP-1B) on 1 July 1931, redesignated Patrol Squadron 1-F (VP-1F) on 15 April 1933, redesignated Patrol Squadron 1 (VP-1) on 1 October 1937, redesignated Patrol Squadron 21 (VP-21) on 1 July 1939, redesignated Patrol Squadron 1 (VP-1) on 30 July 1940, redesignated Patrol Squadron 101 (VP-101) on 3 December 1940, redesignated Patrol Bombing Squadron 29 (VPB-29) on 1 October 1944 and disestablished on 20 June 1945.

== Operational history ==
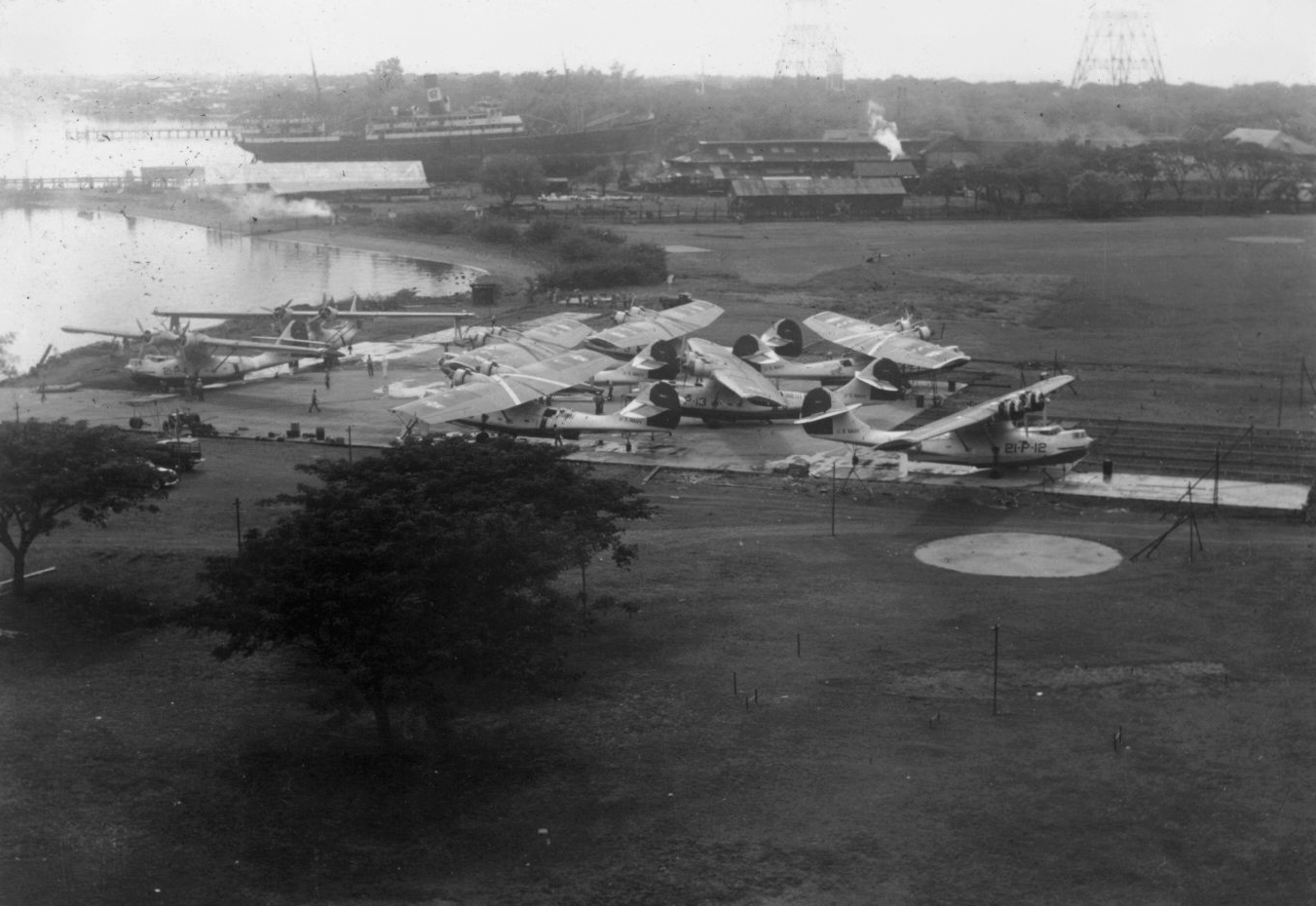
VP-21 PBY-4s at Naval Station Sangley Point c.1940

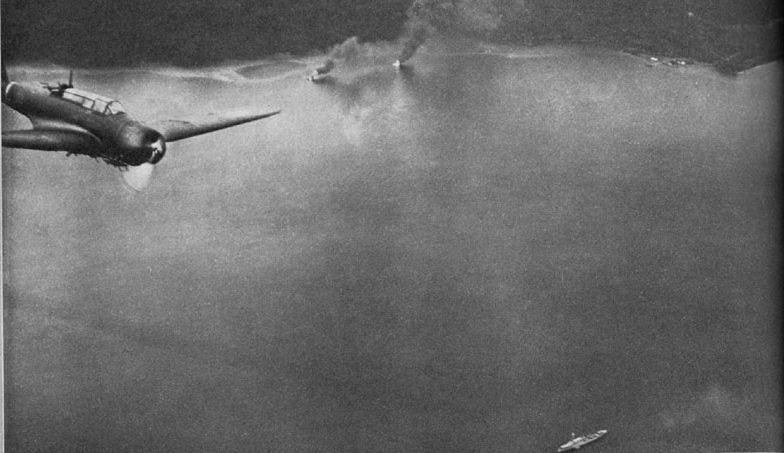
Japanese B5N-1 over USS William B. Preston in Malalag Bay, Philippines with two VP-101 PBY-4s burning in the bay, 8 December 1941

- 17 January 1923: Pacific Air Detachment, Navy Yard Pearl Harbor, Hawaii, was formed with a hodgepodge of aircraft types. Aircraft assigned to the new unit consisted of F-5L, DT and H-16 models. The unit came under the operational control of Aircraft Squadrons, Battle Fleet, based on the reorganization of the fleet on 17 June 1922. By the end of 1923 the detachment was flying six F-5Ls.
- 29 May 1924: Pacific Air Detachment was assigned the Patrol Squadron 14 (VP-14) designation by Chief of Naval Operations (CNO). The new designation placed it under the Naval Coast Defense Forces, Hawaii Region
- 1 May 1925: VP-14 participated in exercises against the fleet at Oahu.
- 15 Jul 1927: The squadron flew two F-5Ls to Molokai to assist in the salvage of the airplane City of Oakland. Two civilian pilots, Smith and Bronte, flew this aircraft from the West Coast depending on radio direction bearings for locating Hawaii. Their receiver broke down forcing them to use dead reckoning. The pair flew on, eventually locating Molokai Island where they made a forced landing in the treetops. Both Smith and Emory were unhurt. Their successful attempt at crossing the Pacific had already been beaten on 28–29 June 1927 by two Army aviators, Lester Maitland and Albert Hegenberger, who flew from Oakland, California, to Hawaii in an Army Fokker C-2 monoplane named Bird of Paradise.
- 17 August 1927: VP-14 provided three F-5Ls for seven-to-eight hour patrols over the Pineapple Derby flight route which also had destroyers located along the route at 15-minute intervals. The early pioneer successes of the teams Maitland and Heggenberger and Smith and Bronte in crossing the Pacific inspired James Dole to sponsor his Pineapple Derby race in August 1927. Dole, head of the Hawaiian Pineapple Company, had offered a prize of $25,000 to the first flyer in the race to cross the Pacific and reach Honolulu, Hawaii, from the continental U.S. The Pineapple Derby attracted eight entries, but only four aircraft actually left for Hawaii. A Lockheed Vega named Golden Eagle, sponsored by John Randolph Hearst Jr., and a Buhl biplane named Miss Doran never arrived and were presumed lost at sea. Art Goebel’s Woolaroc Travel Air 5000 monoplane was the winner of the race. Goebel arrived overdue at Wheeler Field on the 17th, followed a few hours later by the only other plane to complete the race, Aloha, a Breese monoplane piloted by Martin Jensen and Paul Schluter. The state of technology at that time proved unequal to the challenge. The total number killed in pre-race crashes, losses en route to Hawaii and deaths in the fruitless search for missing planes amounted to nine men and one woman.
- 21 September 1927: VP-14 was redesignated VP-1D14, the D14 representing the 14th Naval District, Pearl Harbor. The squadron was stationed at NAS Ford Island, Pearl Harbor, Hawaii, supported by the tender USS Pelican.
- 7 March 1928: VP-1D14 participated in Fleet Problem VIII with Submarine Division Nine in preparation for battle practice. Flights included radio compass calibration flights in cooperation with Army aircraft.
- 31 May 1928: Two Australians, Flight Lieutenant Charles Ulm and Squadron Leader Charles Kingsford Smith, departed Oakland, California, in a Fokker trimotor attempting to fly from California to Australia. VP-1D14 provided air patrols in the event that they went down at sea. The aircraft, however, made a successful crossing and landed safely on 9 June at Brisbane after a flight of 83 hours and 15 minutes.
- 15 August 1928: VP-1D14 participated in the Captain Cook sesquicentennial celebration exercises with the Army, in honor of Cook's discovery of the Hawaiian Islands. Squadron aircraft operated for the first time from advanced bases at Nawiliwili, Kauai and Waimea, Kauai. Operations were successful, but many problems occurred with the Liberty engines in the H-16s. These aircraft were scheduled for replacement by the new T2D.
- 15 November 1928: VP-1D14 tested the first T2D aircraft, a replacement for the Navy's aging H-16s. Trials were conducted on air maneuverability, speed, and quick takeoff, rough water and high-altitude capabilities.
- 20 February 1929: VP-1D14 conducted the first aerial surveys for charts of the Hawaiian islands, basing detachments at outlying islands to secure the necessary photographs. The survey was completed a month later.
- 14 September 1930: VP-1D14, VP-4D14, and VJ-6D14 departed Pearl Harbor for Hilo in company with USS Pelican for tests of advanced base operations and extended operations from a patrol airplane tender, including servicing of the new T2D and PD-1 aircraft while afloat.
- 1 July 1931: Under a reorganization of the fleet, VP-1D14 was transferred from a Naval Air Station squadron to assignment under Commander Minecraft, Battle Force, Fleet Air Base Pearl Harbor.
- 15 April 1933: FAB Pearl Harbor was reorganized from Minecraft, Battle Force and placed under Base Force, along with the associated squadrons assigned to the base, including VP-1.
- 22 April 1933: VP-1F departed Pearl Harbor with VPs 4F and 6F for an extended training flight to French Frigate Shoals. This flight with a group of patrol squadrons was one of the longest conducted to date.
- 13 January 1934: The year 1934 marked the beginning of the annual patrol squadron exercises in the Hawaiian and Midway Island sectors. Approximately half of the ten patrol squadrons participated each year with their full complement of aircraft and support vessels.
- 22 April 1935: VP-1F participated in Fleet Problem XVI at Midway Island, with VPs 4F, 6F, 7F, 8F, 9F, 10F and several support vessels.
- 28 May 1935: CNO established administrative organizations designated Patrol Wings (PatWing) to each of the three Base Force Fleet Air Bases. FAB San Diego, California, supported PatWing-1; FAB Coco Solo, Panama Canal Zone, supported PatWing-3; and FAB Pearl Harbor supported PatWing-2, the home base of VP-1F.
- 25 March 1938: Aircraft of VPs 1F, 4F, 6F, 8F, 10F and 18F participated in Fleet Problem XIX (Phase V) as part of Red Force. This exercise demonstrated the extreme vulnerability of slow flying patrol bombers mounting attacks in the face of strong anti-aircraft (AA) fire. The majority of aircraft making runs were judged shot down.
- 17 October 1938: VP-1 pilots took delivery of PBY-4s at NAS San Diego, with additional aircraft being delivered through 18 January 1939.
- 1 July 1939: VP-1 was redesignated Patrol Squadron 21 and assigned to the Asiatic Fleet, becoming the nucleus for the newly formed Patrol Wing 10 at Cavite Naval Base, Luzon, Philippines.
- 7 December 1941: VP-101 was placed on war alert upon receiving news of the Attack on Pearl Harbor and war patrols commenced.
- 14 December 1941: PatWing-10 was relocated from the devastated Cavite Naval Base at Luzon, to Balikpapan in an attempt to keep ahead of the advancing Japanese forces.
- 23 December 1941: VP-102 was merged with VP-101 to combine the squadrons’ dwindling assets in aircraft, crews and material. On the 25th VP-101 was relocated to Ambon Island, Netherlands East Indies.
- 27 December 1941: Six of the squadron's PBY-4s led by Lieutenant Burden R. Hastings, conducted an early morning attack against Jolo, in the central Philippines. Enemy aircraft and AA fire broke up the formation before a bombing run could be made. Ensign Elwin L. Christman and his crew followed through alone and made a drop on an enemy vessel at 1,000 feet. The Catalina, heavily damaged by AA fire, caught fire. Three crewmen bailed out, but the others remained with the aircraft until Christman made a controlled water landing near shore. Three crewmen died; the others were eventually rescued. Aviation Machinist Mate's First Class Andrew K. Waterman was the plane captain and waist gunner on the aircraft. He shot down one enemy aircraft while defending the Catalina during the attack on shipping in the harbor, but in doing so received mortal wounds. For his courageous actions under fire Waterman was posthumously awarded the Navy Cross. Radioman First Class RobertL. Pettit also stuck by his post even after the aircraft, flooded with aviation gas from perforated tanks, caught fire. For his devotion to duty Pettit was posthumously awarded the Navy Cross. Ensign Christman led the surviving members of his crew to safety on the shore of Jolo Island. Lieutenant Jack B. Dawley and the surviving members of his crew, who had also been shot down immediately after dropping their bombs, joined Christman's group on Jolo Island. The two officers led their crews inland away from the Japanese, eventually reaching U.S. Naval Headquarters at Surabaya, Java. Aircraft Chief Machinist's Mate Donald D. Lurvey was awarded the Navy Cross for assisting Ensign Cough, the second pilot of Dawley's aircraft, into a life vest and guiding him to shore. Aviation Machinist's Mate First Class Joseph Bangust received the Navy Cross posthumously for his action as waist gunner in Dawley's aircraft, shooting down one enemy aircraft before being mortally wounded by incoming fire. Aviation Machinist's Mate First Class Evren C. McLawhorn, the plane captain, took over the waist gun position after Bangust was mortally wounded. He received seven wounds during the fight, but survived and received the Navy Cross for his heroism. For their courage under fire and leadership in guiding their crews through enemy-occupied territory to safety, Ensign Christman and Lieutenant Dawley were awarded the Navy Cross. Lieutenant Hastings, as leader of the gallant but unsuccessful strike, was later awarded the Navy Cross for guiding the force into the target area in the face of overwhelming odds. Lieutenant Hastings’ award was made posthumously, as he and his men were the only aircrew captured by the Japanese. They were interrogated by their captors and beheaded on the parade ground of the Jolo garrison. The fourth Catalina shot down during the strike was manned by Lieutenant Hazelton and his crew. Hazelton made a sea landing and the entire crew safely escaped the sinking aircraft into life rafts and were picked up two days later by a squadron aircraft.
- 16 January 1942: VP-101 was ordered to evacuate Ambon due to the presence of an approaching Japanese naval task force. Assets and personnel were moved to Surabaya.
- 1 March 1942: VP-22’s assets were merged with VP-101, which was then ordered to evacuate Surabaya and withdraw to Seaplane Base Nedlands, Perth, Australia, to reform and refit the devastated squadron.
- 7 March 1942: VPs 102, 21 and 22 were officially disestablished, with the remaining personnel and aircraft assets being combined to bring up to full strength the remaining squadron, VP-101.
- 26 April 1942: A desperate attempt was made to rescue personnel otherwise doomed to capture on the besieged island of Corregidor. Two Catalinas, formerly assigned to VP-102, flew a circuitous route back to the Philippines, arriving around midnight of the 29th. Over 30 nurses were flown out that night under cover of darkness.
- 1 May 1942: The reformed VP-101 recommenced combat patrols off the coast of Australia, operating from bases at Exmouth Gulf, Pelican Point, Geraldton and Albany. Tender support was provided by USS Childs, USS Heron and USS Preston.
- 28 September 1942: A VP-101 PBY-5 mistook the U.S. Navy submarine USS Snapper (SS-185) for a Japanese submarine and attacked her in the Indian Ocean 330 nautical miles (611 km; 380 mi) south-southwest of Bali at a position given by Snapper as 12°59′S 113°42′E and by the PBY as 12°50′S 114°28′E. Snapper crash-dived, and the PBY dropped one depth charge that shook Snapper as she passed through a depth of 140 feet (43 m) on her way to 250 feet (76 m). Snapper suffered only superficial damage and no casualties.
- 9 November 1942 – 29 June 1943: Upon return to Perth, Australia, VP-101 was split into three units—HEDRON, SCORON and VP-101. Combat patrols were under operational control of FAW-17.
- 22 May 1943: A VP-101 PBY mistook the U.S. Navy submarine USS Grayling (SS-209) for a Japanese submarine and attacked with a depth charge as Grayling submerged in the Indian Ocean at 17°S 115°E. The depth charge did not explode.
- 29 June 1943: VP-101 relocated to Brisbane, Australia.
- 1 July 1943: The first element of VP-101 flew into Port Moresby, Papua, New Guinea. Its aircraft were in poor mechanical shape and the decision was made to use them to supply guerrilla fighters in the vicinity of Wewak. Landings were made on the Sepik River leading into Lake Yibiri. The flights continued through October 1943, but were discontinued due to increased Japanese opposition. The guerrilla fighters were rescued in December 1945 by aircraft from VP-11. The second element of VP-101 was moved to the eastern end of New Guinea to begin Black Cat operations from the seaplane tender USS San Pablo, anchored in Namoia Bay. The squadron's Catalinas were fitted with ASV radar sets. The highly touted Norden bombsights proved worthless, being unable to hit fast moving, dodging Japanese ships from any height. Instead, a low-level bombing tactic was worked out using one foot of altitude for each pound of bomb weight. Thus, a 500-pound bomb was released from a 500-foot (150 m) altitude leading into a target, resulting in only a gentle updraft from the bomb blast. This technique was necessary due to the lack of a four-to-five second delay on the bomb fuses.
- 1–28 December 1943: VP-101 squadron headquarters were established at Palm Island, Australia, with advance bases at Samarai and Port Moresby, New Guinea. Combat patrols and crew training were conducted concurrently through the 28th, when the squadron returned to Perth. Upon return, the squadron again came under the operational control of FAW-10.
- 1 May 1944: VP-101 was relocated to Samarai, New Guinea. Dumbo (air-sea rescue) missions were conducted in the area of the Green, Treasury, Manus and Emirau islands, coming under the operational control of FAW-17.
- 1–16 July 1944: Five squadron aircraft were based at Manus, five at Green Island, two at Emirau, and one at Treasury Island. On the 16th, the detachments were relocated to the Admiralty Islands and later the Solomon Islands chain. Operations consisted primarily of Dumbo rescue missions to recover downed USAAF and Navy airmen.
- 19 September 1944: VP-101 was relieved by VP-52 in the Solomons and relocated to Morotai, north of New Guinea, aboard USS Half Moon. After settling in at Morotai, the squadron commenced combat operations as a Black Cat squadron on 21 September.
- October 1944:The squadron continued to conduct Black Cat missions, antisubmarine patrols and night patrols around the area of Mindanao and Tawi-Tawi.
- 10 November 1944: The squadron was relieved by VPB-20 for return to the continental U.S., arriving at NAS Alameda, California, on 30 November. The squadron commenced reforming and training following the return of personnel from leave and the arrival of new assignments.

== Aircraft assignments ==
The squadron was assigned the following aircraft, effective on the dates shown:

- F-5L - January 1923
- DT - January 1923
- H-16 - January 1923
- T2D-1 - October 1928
- PK-1 - November 1931
- P2Y-3 - September 1938
- PBY-4 - October 1938
- PBY-5 - May 1942

== Home port assignments ==
The squadron was assigned to these home ports, effective on the dates shown:

- NAS Ford Island, Hawaii - 17 January 1923
- Naval Base Cavite, Luzon, Philippines - 1 July 1939
- Perth, Australia - 1 March 1942
- Brisbane, Australia - 29 June 1943
- Palm Island, Australia - 1 December 1943
- Perth, Australia - 28 December 1943
- Samarai, New Guinea 1 May 1944
- Morotai - 19 September 1944
- NAS Alameda, California - 30 November 1944
- NAS San Diego, California - 12 December 1944

== See also ==
- Maritime patrol aircraft
- List of inactive United States Navy aircraft squadrons
- List of United States Navy aircraft squadrons
- List of squadrons in the Dictionary of American Naval Aviation Squadrons
- History of the United States Navy
