= VP-20 =

Patrol Squadron 20
- Active: 1 July 1929 – 31 March 1949
- Country: United States of America
- Branch: United States Navy
- Type: squadron
- Role: Maritime patrol
- Engagements: World War II

Aircraft flown
- Patrol: T3M-2; XPY-1; T4M-1; PM-1; PH-1; PBY-1/5/5A; PB4Y-2

VP-20 was a Patrol Squadron of the U.S. Navy. The squadron was established as Patrol Squadron 8-S (VP-8S) from elements of VT-9S on 1 July 1929, redesignated Patrol Squadron 8-F (VP-8F) on 3 April 1933, redesignated Patrol Squadron 8 (VP-8) on 1 October 1937, redesignated Patrol Squadron 24 (VP-24) on 1 July 1939, redesignated Patrol Squadron 12 (VP-12) on 1 August 1941, redesignated Patrol Bombing Squadron 120 (VPB-120) on 1 October 1944, redesignated Patrol Squadron 120 (VP-120) on 15 May 1946, redesignated Heavy Patrol Squadron (Landplane) 10 (VP-HL-10) on 15 November 1946, redesignated Patrol Squadron 20 (VP-20) on 1 September 1948 and disestablished on 31 March 1949. It was the third squadron to be designated VP-20, the first VP-20 was redesignated VP-44 on 1 July 1940 and the second VP-20 was redesignated VPB-20 on 1 October 1944.

== Operational history ==
- 1 July – September 1929: A detachment of six aircraft and crews from VT-9S were used to provide the cadre for the establishment of a new patrol squadron, VP-8S. The squadron was assigned the T3M-2 torpedo-bombers, the same type flown by VT-9S. In September, the VP-8S received the XPY-1 for service tests and development of the Bellini–Tosi direction finder.
- 1 May 1930: VP-8S operated with VT-9S during fleet exercises at Guantanamo Bay Naval Base, Cuba.
- 1 Jun 1930: VP-8S was a new home port at NAF Newport, Rhode Island, with tender support provided by USS Wright. Squadron T3M-2 aircraft were turned in and replaced with the T4M-1
- 1 November 1930: VP-8S became a true patrol squadron with the replacement of its T4M twin-float torpedo bombers with the new mono-hull PM-1 flying boats.
- 1 January 1931: The squadron had the first opportunity to test its new aircraft during Fleet Problem XII with the fleet off Guantanamo. During the exercise VP-8S was provided tender service by USS Wright.
- 1 July 1931: Another round of fleet exercises was conducted off the shores of Cuba. These operations included joint participation by the squadron and VPs 3S, 5S and 10S, based at FAB Coco Solo, Panama Canal Zone. USS Wright provided tender services for all the squadrons.
- 1 January 1932: VP-8S and VP-10S conducted exercises with the fleet in Cuban waters.
- 1 April 1933: VP-8S was reorganized from Scouting Fleet to Base Force, changing its designation to VP-8F in the process. The squadron was still flying six PM-1 flying boats, with tender support provided by USS Swann and USS Lapwing.
- 13 January 1934: VP-8F participated in fleet exercises off Hawaii with VPs 1F, 4F, 6F and 10F.
- 22 April 1935: VP-8F participated in Fleet Problem XVI with VPs 1F, 4F, 6F, 7F, 9F and 10F off Midway Island in a test of advanced basing at remote sites utilizing numerous support (tender and supply) vessels.
- 1 October 1937: VP-8F was redesignated VP-8 when patrol squadrons were reorganized for operational control transferred from Base Force to Patrol Wings. VP-8 and all of the other patrol squadrons in the Hawaii region came under PatWing-2.
- 25 March 1938: Aircrews from VPs 1, 4, 6, 8, 10 and 18 participated in Fleet Problem XIX (Phase V) as part of Red Force operating against Blue Force. The exercises showed that slow flying patrol aircraft had virtually no chance of penetrating the anti-aircraft (AA) screen of the fleet. The majority of aircraft conducting mock attacks during the exercises were judged to have been shot down.
- 9 April 1940: Aircrews from VPs 21, 22, 23, 24, 25 and 26 participated in Fleet Problem XXI with the USAAF 72nd Bombardment Squadron and the 4th Reconnaissance Squadron. The purpose of the exercise was to judge the effectiveness of joint services air support during an attack on the islands by an enemy carrier fleet. Coordination between Army and Naval air units was judged very poor. Communications problems between the Army and Navy aircraft and ground controllers resulted in disjointed efforts at defense.
- 10 March 1941: VP-24 was relocated to NAS Kaneohe Bay, Hawaii, as one of the first squadrons to occupy the new base.
- 1 August 1941: VP-24 with 14 PBY-1s on hand was redesignated VP-12. The original VP-12 at NAS San Diego, California, was split into halves with one group becoming a new VP-24 and the second half flying trans-Pacific to NAS Kaneohe Bay on 2 September 1941, to join the newly redesignated VP-12 in Hawaii. The San Diego contingent of the squadron brought with them six newer model PBY-5s as replacements for the older PBY-1 aircraft. Upon arrival, the squadron and its six aircraft were based at NAS Ford Island, Pearl Harbor.
- 7 December 1941: Only one of the squadron's six new PBY-5s was damaged during the Attack on Pearl Harbor. One in front of the hangar on ready alert received bullet holes through one wing, but was otherwise intact. The remaining four aircraft been sent on an early morning exercise and were not caught on the ground by the Japanese fighters. The VP-12 hangar was undamaged, but the VP-21 and VP-22 hangars had burned, along with several aircraft. For a while, Ford Island was the only installation with flyable Catalinas, as NAS Kaneohe Bay had lost nearly all of it aircraft on the ground.
- 8 December 1941 – 30 October 1942: During this period VP-12 was transferred to NAS Kaneohe Bay conducting patrols in the waters off Hawaii and rotating detachments to Midway Island. Crews were trained on the new replacement PBY-5A aircraft received in September 1942.
- 22 November 1942: VP-12 was transferred to the Fiji Islands, with an operational base on Nandi. Operational control for the squadron was transferred from FAW-2 to FAW-1.
- 15 December 1942: As a result of the matte-black paint schemes and night-time bombing operations conducted by the squadron, VP-12 officially became known as a Black Cat squadron, along with VPs 11, 51 and 91. The area of operations during this period was concentrated around Guadalcanal.
- 24 July 1943: VP-12 was withdrawn from combat and returned to NAS San Diego. The squadron was reformed and new personnel given training through 1 December 1943, when preparations for the trans-Pacific flight back to NAS Kaneohe Bay were begun.
- 13 December 1943: VP-12 began the trans-Pacific flight from NAS San Diego to NAS Kaneohe Bay with seven PBY-5As.
- 20 December 1943: The squadron sent a detachment of six aircraft to Midway Island to relieve VB-144. Four of the aircraft and the six crews returned to Kaneohe on 13 January 1943, leaving two aircraft and three crews behind which rejoined the squadron on 18 January 1944.
- 7 February 1944: VP-12 arrived at Guadalcanal for duty under the operational control of FAW-1. The squadron's complement at this point had been boosted to 15 PBY-5As. Two days after arrival one plane and one crew were dispatched to Tarawa and Majuro for photoreconnaissance duties.
- 17 February 1944: VP-12 was relocated to Ondonga Airfield, New Georgia. Over the next month the principal duties of the squadron consisted of ferry and supply trips between Kaneohe and Ondonga.
- 1 March 1944: The squadron switched from ferry duties to combat missions. The squadron's duties consisted of anti-shipping searches, artillery spotting and Dumbo (air-sea rescue) missions. On 3 March 1944, VP- 12 conducted a night bombing raid on Saipasi Island.
- 1 April 1944: Two aircraft were detached from the squadron for Dumbo duty searching for downed Army bomber aircrews. One crew was based at Green Island and another at Torokina Airfield. Each worked with a submarine along the routes of aircraft returning from bombing missions. When a crew was spotted on the water the Dumbo would contact the submarine to pick them up, or if the sea was not too rough, land and pick them up.
- 17 May – 14 June 1944: VP-12 aircraft were detailed to conduct antishipping searches north of Emirau Island. These duties continued until 14 June 1944, when the entire squadron was relocated to Luganville Seaplane Base, Espiritu Santo. After the relocation, three aircraft were detailed to conduct antishipping patrols, and one aircraft for air-sea rescue.
- 30 July 1944: VP-12 was relieved of duty in the combat zone and was en route to NAS Kaneohe Bay, for further transfer to the continental United States.
- 1 October 1944 – July 1945: VP-12 had been relocated to NAS Whidbey Island under the operational control of FAW-6 for refitting and reforming of the squadron. The squadron was redesignated VPB-120. The new squadron was in the process of transitioning from the amphibious PBY-5A to the land-based PB4Y-2. The training period was extended through 19 July 1945, when the squadron deployed to NAS Shemya, Aleutian Islands, under the operational control of FAW-4. Upon arrival on 25 July 1945, area indoctrination training was undertaken.
- 1 Aug 1945: VPB-120 began antishipping patrols north of the Kurile Islands. These missions and photoreconnaissance missions were conducted until the end of September when the squadron was relocated from Shemya to NAF Attu. The squadron remained at this location for the remainder of the deployment and then returned to NAS Whidbey Island in early 1946.
- 31 March 1949: VP-20 was disestablished.

== Aircraft assignments ==
The squadron was assigned the following aircraft, effective on the dates shown:

- T4M-1 - August 1927
- T3M-2 - July 1929
- XPY-1 September 1929
- T4M - June 1930
- PM-1 - November 1930
- PH-1 - 1932
- PBY-1 - 1937
- PBY-5 - August 1941
- PBY-5A - September 1942
- PB4Y-2 - August 1944

== Home port assignments ==
The squadron was assigned to these home ports, effective on the dates shown:

- Hampton Roads, Virginia - 1 July 1929
- NAF Newport, Rhode Island - 1 June 1930
- FAB Coco Solo, Panama Canal Zone - 1 February 1932
- NAS Pearl Harbor, Hawaii - 19 May 1933
- NAS Kaneohe Bay, Hawaii - 10 March 1941
- NAS Ford Island, Hawaii - August 1941
- NAS Kaneohe Bay - December 1941
- NAS San Diego, California - 24 July 1943
- NAS Kaneohe Bay - December 1943
- NAS Whidbey Island, Washington - August 1944

== See also ==
- Maritime patrol aircraft
- List of inactive United States Navy aircraft squadrons
- List of United States Navy aircraft squadrons
- List of squadrons in the Dictionary of American Naval Aviation Squadrons
- History of the United States Navy
