= VP-46 =

VP-46 Grey Knights
- VP-46 Insignia
- Active: 1 July 1931 - present
- Country: United States
- Branch: United States Navy
- Role: Maritime Patrol & Reconnaissance; Anti-Submarine Warfare; Anti-Surface Warfare
- Part of: Commander, Patrol and Reconnaissance Wing Ten
- Garrison/HQ: Naval Air Station Whidbey Island
- Nickname: Grey Knights
- Mottos: The Oldest and Best; Strength and Honor
- Engagements: World War II; Korean War; Vietnam War

Aircraft flown
- Patrol: PM-2; P2Y-1/2; PBY-3/5; PBM-3C/5E/5S2; P5M-1; P-2V-5F/7/SP-2H; P-3A/B/C; P-8 A

Patrol Squadron 46 (VP-46), also known as the "Grey Knights", is a maritime patrol squadron of the United States Navy based at Naval Air Station Whidbey Island, Washington. Part of Patrol and Reconnaissance Wing Ten, VP-46 is the oldest maritime patrol squadron and the second oldest aircraft squadron in the entire U.S. Navy, second only behind VFA-14.

The squadron was originally established as Patrol Squadron 5-S (VP-5S) on 1 July 1931, redesignated Patrol Squadron 5-F (VP-5F) on 1 April 1933, redesignated Patrol Squadron 5 (VP-5) on 1 October 1937, redesignated Patrol Squadron 33 (VP-33) on 1 July 1939, redesignated Patrol Squadron 32 (VP-32) on 1 October 1941, redesignated Patrol Bombing Squadron 32 (VPB-32) on 1 October 1944, redesignated Patrol Squadron 32 (VP-32) on 15 May 1946, redesignated Medium Patrol Squadron (Seaplane) 6 (VP-MS-6) on 15 November 1946 and redesignated Patrol Squadron 46 (VP-46) on 1 September 1948.

== Operational history ==
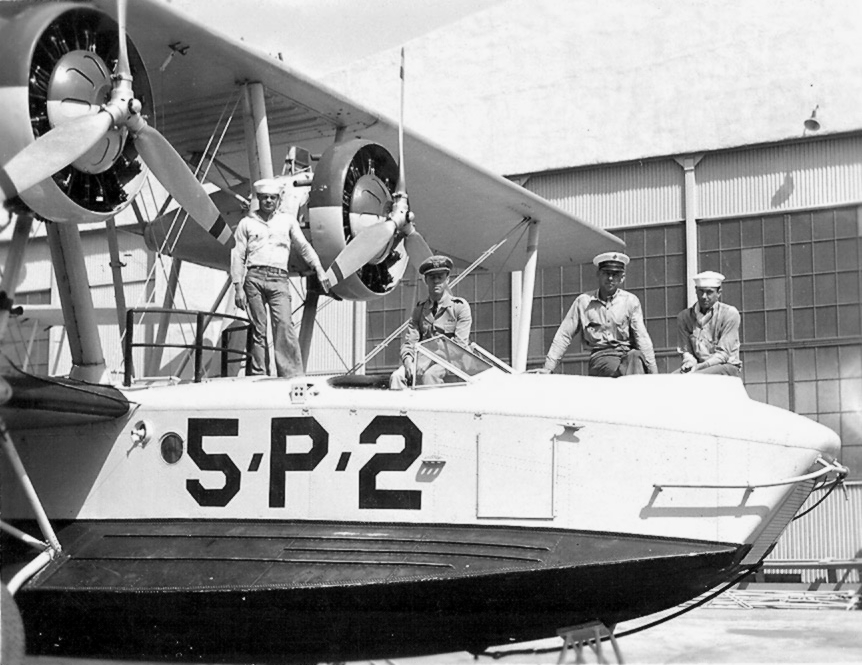
VP-5S PM-2 and crew at NAS Coco Solo c.1934

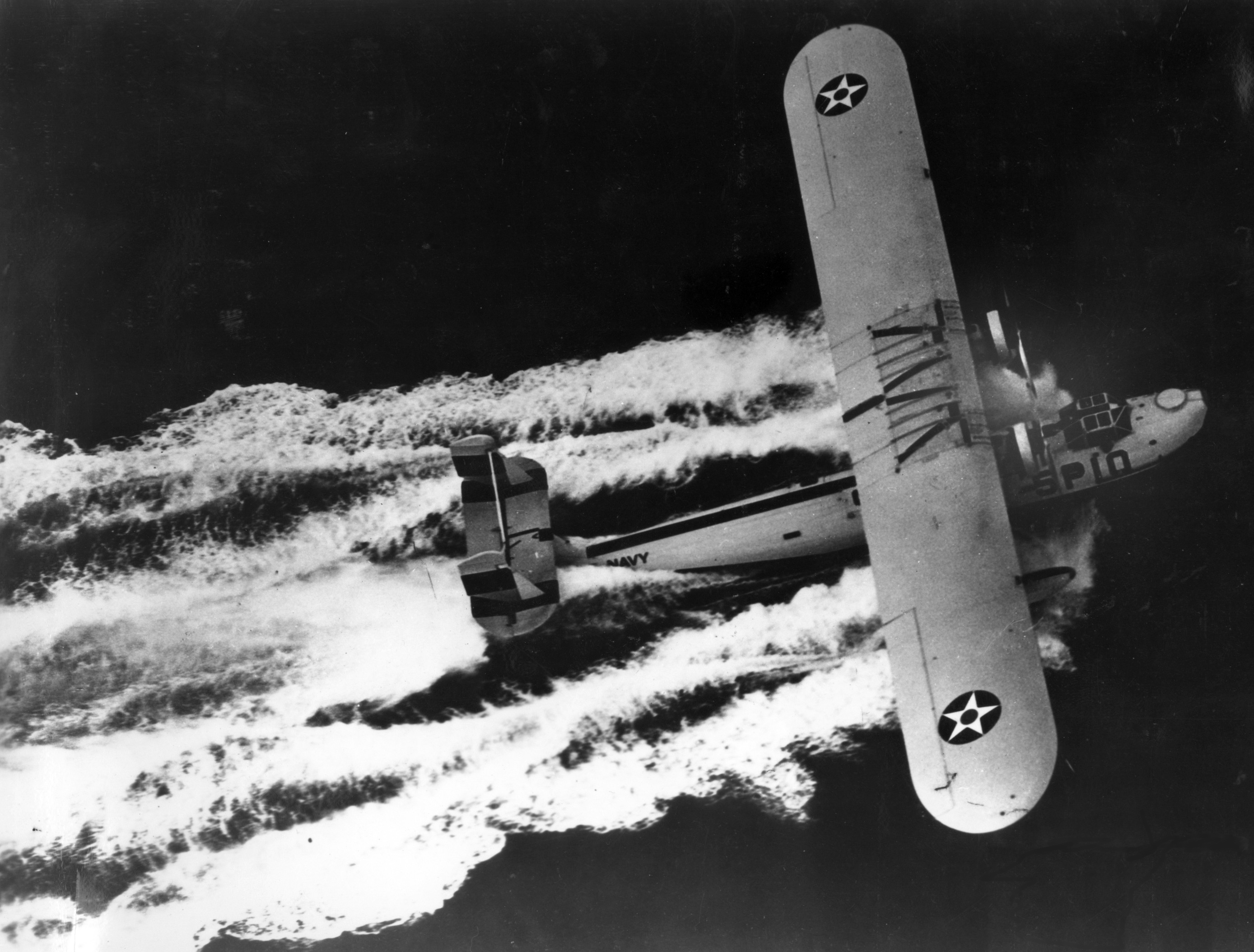
VP-5F P2Y-1 taking off, 1930s

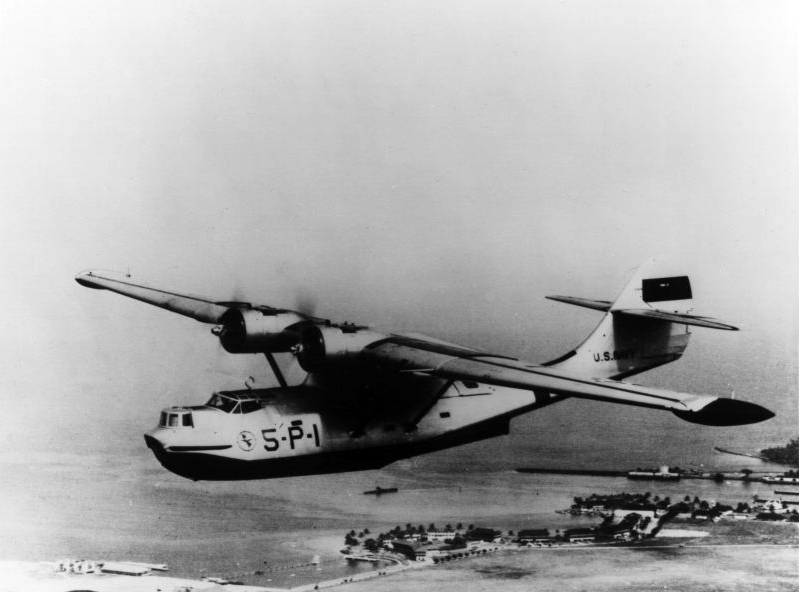
VP-5 PBY-3 over Panama in 1939

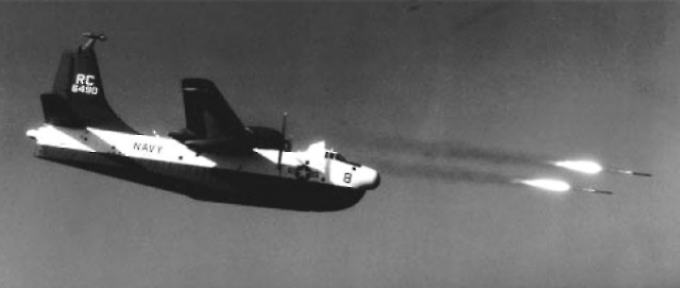
VP-46 P5M-1 firing HVAR rockets in the 1950s

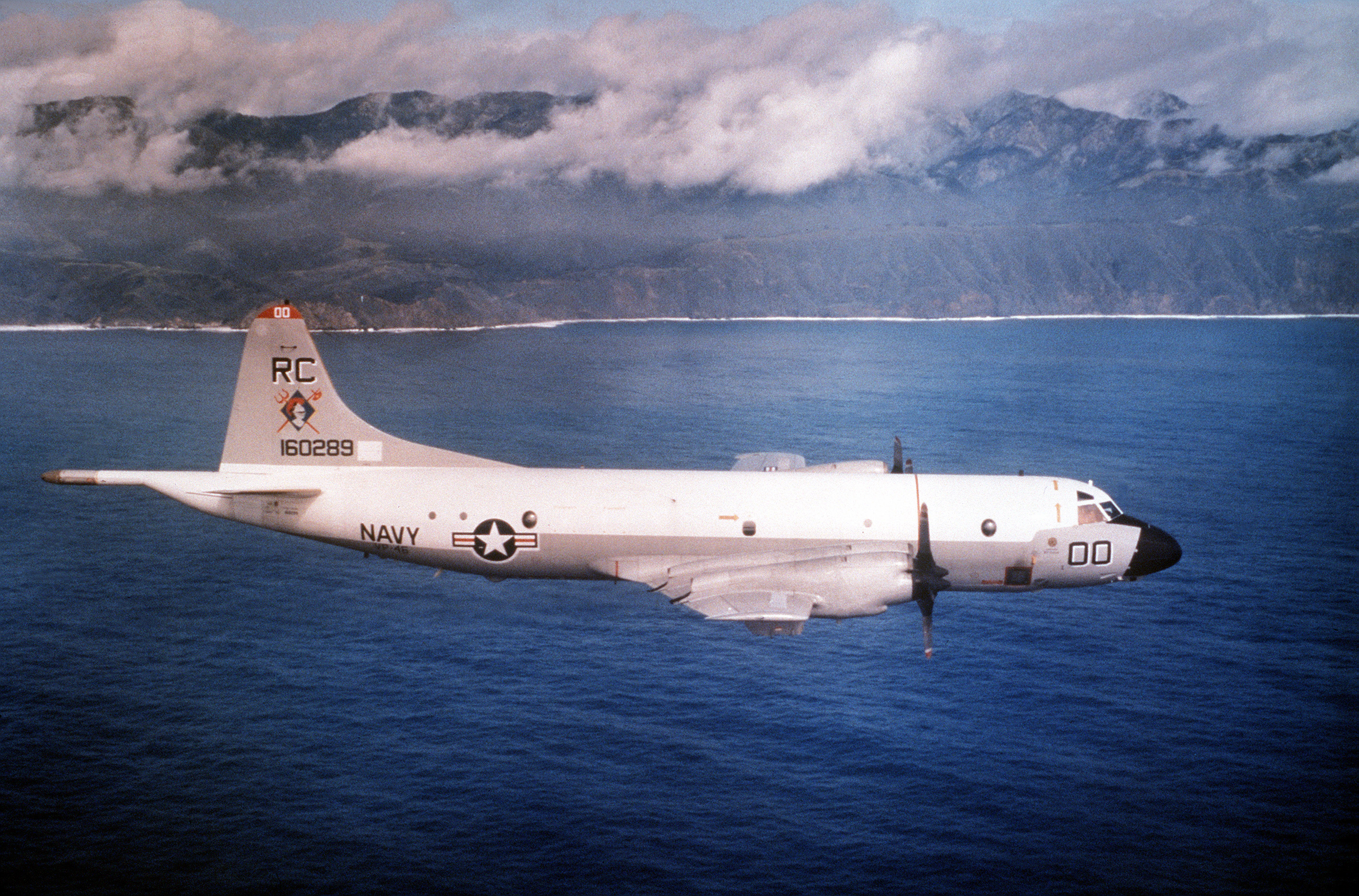
VP-46 P-3C in 1989

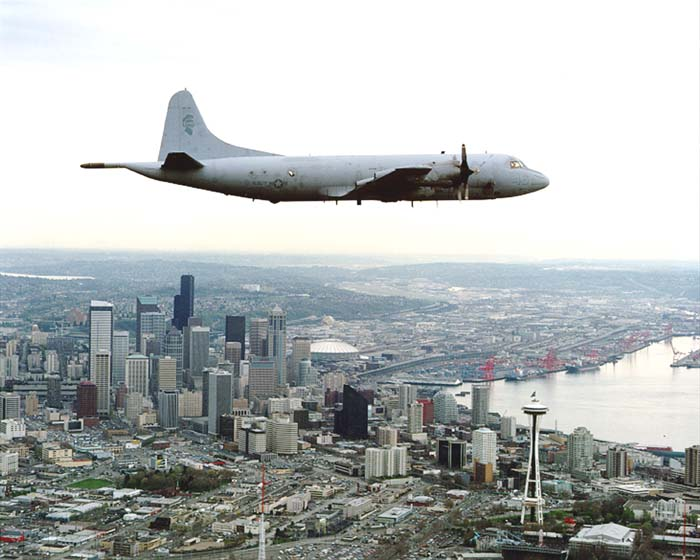
VP-46 P-3C over Seattle in 2010

- 1 July 1931: VP-5S was established at NAS Coco Solo, Panama Canal Zone, while on exercises at Naval Station Guantanamo Bay, Cuba, coming under Commander Air, Scouting Force with sister squadrons VPs 3S, 8S and 10S. Upon completion of Fleet Problem No. XII, newly designated VP-5S returned to its home base at NAS Coco Solo.
- 1 February 1932: VP-5S and VP-2S were transferred for patrol duties to NAS San Diego, California.
- March 1932: VP-5S flew to San Francisco, to take part in Fleet Problem XIII, based on USS Wright. They returned to San Francisco for Fleet Problem XIV in February 1933.
- 1 April 1933: VP-5S was redesignated VP-5F, under the organizational command of Base Force.
- 22 April 1933: VP-5F was reassigned to its old home base at NAS Coco Solo, with VP-2F.
- May 1933: VP-5F flew from NAS Coco Solo to NAS Norfolk, Virginia, then on to Philadelphia, where the squadron's PM-2 aircraft were turned in. New P2Y-1 seaplanes were received at Norfolk and were prepared for the return trip to Coco Solo. In June the second division of six squadron aircraft returned to Coco Solo with several stops in Florida and Jamaica.
- 7 September 1933: The squadron's first division made the first nonstop flight from NAS Hampton Roads, Virginia, to NAS Coco Solo, in six new P2Y-1 seaplanes under the command of Lieutenant Commander Herman E. Halland. The squadron flew a distance of 2,059 miles (3,314 km) in 25 hours and 19 minutes, establishing the longest nonstop seaplane formation flight to date, surpassing the previous record by 169 miles (272 km). Upon arrival, the six new aircraft were turned in to VP-10F in exchange for six slightly older P2Ys.
- 21 April 1934: VP-5F, 2F, 3F, 7F and 9F participated in Fleet Problem XV in support of fleet operations off Cuba, Haiti, the Dominican Republic and Puerto Rico.
- 1 January 1935: VPs 5F and 3F participated in exercises in the Caribbean to test seaplane operations in the open ocean from tenders USS Wright, USS Lapwing, USS Teal and USS Gannet.
- August 1935: VPs 5F and 2F participated in advanced base operations in Trujillo Bay, Honduras, tended by USS Lapwing and USS Teal.
- January 1936: VP-5F conducted advanced base operations at Santelmo Bay, Perlas Islands, tended by USS Teal.
- 23 February 1937: VP-5F participated in extended flight operations in the Caribbean with VP-2F, based at Guantanamo Bay, Cuba; Mayaguez and San Juan, Puerto Rico; St. Thomas, Culebra; and Balhia Honda, Colombia.
- 1 October 1937: VP-5F was redesignated VP-5 when Navy patrol squadrons were reorganized under the command of Patrol Wings. VPs 5, 2 and 3 came under Patrol Wing-3, NAS Coco Solo.
- 14 May – 14 September 1938: VP-5 departed Coco Solo for NAS Norfolk, where the squadron turned in their P2Y-2 seaplanes. On 18 May the squadron arrived at NAS San Diego, California, to receive replacement PBY-3 Catalina aircraft and transition training in the new seaplanes. By August nearly all of the crews with the new aircraft had experienced problems with high noise levels in the PBY-3 while on patrols. The sources of the problems were found to be the lack of interior insulation in the aircraft and higher propeller tip speed. Subsequent production incorporated insulation and dressed down propeller tips that greatly reduced the noise problem. The squadron returned to NAS Coco Solo on 14 September 1938.
- 11 February 1939: PatWing-3 squadrons, including VPs 2, 3 and 5, participated in Fleet Problem No. XX as part of the Black Force during exercises in the Caribbean. VP-5 operated in the Semana area off Cuba, supported by USS Langley. The exercises again pointed out the vulnerability of the patrol aircraft in the face of determined anti-aircraft (AA) fire from defending vessels, and the vulnerability of the patrol bases ashore to naval or air attack.
- 14 April 1939: VPs 5, 2 and 3 mapped 1,076 miles (1,732 km) of Central American coastline from Nicaragua to the Colombian border. This task was carried out despite weather conditions unfavorable for aerial photography.
- 11 September 1939: VP-33 was assigned to Neutrality Patrol duties in the Caribbean operating out of Guantanamo Bay, Cuba.
- 31 January 1940: VP-33's Neutrality Patrol duties were directed at covering convoys between the Canal Zone and Guantanamo Bay, Cuba.
- 1 July 1940: The squadron had seven aircraft operating out of NAS Coco Solo and three out of San Juan. On 1 July 1940, the squadron received orders to fly all of the squadron aircraft to NAS Jacksonville, Florida, to be turned in for newer model PBY-3 aircraft.
- 1–8 December 1941: By this date, VP-32 was conducting routine patrols for the Army off the coasts of the Canal Zone, supported by USS Sandpiper, USS Matagorda, USS Osmond Ingram, USS Goldsborough and USS Clemson. On 8 December 1941, after the Attack on Pearl Harbor, six aircraft and crews from VP-52 reinforced the squadron. The Army and Navy combined commands after this date, with the Army assuming command of the Panama Sea Frontier, and VP-32 becoming the long-range reconnaissance arm of the Sixth Bomber Command. VP-32 operated under the operational control of the Army until 30 April 1942.
- 15 December 1941: The squadron established advance bases at Almirante, Panama; Grand Cayman Island, Fonsec, Honduras; Castilla, Honduras; and Portland Bight, Jamaica.
- 3 January 1942: VP-32 was supplemented by six more aircraft and crews from VP-81.
- 23 June 1942: Lieutenant (jg) May and crew attacked a German U-boat and were credited with probable damage. Although the primary tasking had shifted on 1 May 1942 to Anti-submarine warfare (ASW) and convoy patrol, few submarine sightings were made during this period by the squadron.
- 12 July 1942: Lieutenant (jg) Pinholster and crew attacked a U-boat in the Caribbean and were credited with probable damage.
- 25 July 1942: Lieutenant (jg) Skelly and crew spotted a suspicious vessel off the coast of Honduras and forced it to heave to by firing shots across its bow. Skelly landed his PBY, deployed a rubber raft and boarded the vessel. A quick search revealed that the vessel was supplying U-boats with supplies and torpedoes hidden in a false bottom. The vessel, Racer, was taken into port and the crew of Axis sympathizers taken into custody.
- 3 August 1942: VP-32 deployed to Salinas, Ecuador, operating under the Sixth Bomber Command, USAAF.
- 19 August 1942: VP-32 deployed to NAS Guantanamo Bay, Cuba, and was placed under Commander Caribbean Sea Frontier, operating under C.C.S.F. operations Order #1-42.
- 1 October 1942: VP-32 was placed under PatWing-11 for administrative purposes. Primary duties consisted of convoy patrols and ASW.
- 1 December 1942: VP-32 received five new PBM-3Cs. Crews began transition training at NAS Coco Solo, from the PBY-3 to the PBM aircraft. Crews from the detachment at NS San Juan, were rotated in for the transition training. The squadron continued to operate PBY-3s alongside the newer PBM.
- 1 April 1943: VP-32 was reassigned along with the rest of the FAW-3 to FAW-11. By this date, complete transition to the PBM aircraft had been completed.
- 15 July 1943: Squadron aircraft conducted an attack on a U-boat in the Caribbean at 15-58N, 73-44W. The claim was judged probable sinking, postwar examination of German records confirmed this was U-159.
- 26 July 1943: A U-boat was attacked at 18-06N, 75-00W, and judged probably sunk, postwar examination of German records confirmed this was U-759.
- 28 July 1943: A U-boat was claimed sunk (probable) at 15-57N, 68-30W by the NS San Juan detachment, postwar examination of German records confirmed this was U-359.
- 1 October 1943: The squadron began transition training on the PBM-3S with improved radar.
- 1 April 1944: VP-32 was transferred from NAS Coco Solo to NAS Guantanamo Bay.
- 7 July – 1 August 1944: VP-32 was transferred from NAS Guantanamo Bay to NAS Norfolk, under FAW-9. Upon arrival, crews were given stateside leave for 30 days, and all squadron aircraft were overhauled. Operations recommenced on 1 August 1944.
- 3 December 1944: A detachment of eight crews and four aircraft were dispatched to NAS Quonset Point, Rhode Island, for emergency patrol operations. During this period the detachment was given training in the use of aircraft searchlights.
- 1 January – February 1945: The squadron received new PBM-5 seaplanes to replace the old PBM-3Ss. Conversion training was carried out through February 1945; upon completion, searchlights were installed in all aircraft.
- 11 April 1945: VPB-32 was transferred to NAS Alameda, California, departing Norfolk on 11 April, arriving on 16 April. The squadron was detailed to provide security for San Francisco Bay during an international conference held in San Francisco to form the United Nations.
- 30 June 1945: The squadron was reassigned to NAAS Harvey Point, North Carolina, for duty with FAW-5.
- 12 September 1945: The squadron was ordered to the west coast for reassignment to a new home port. On 12 September VPB-32 departed NAS Alameda aboard USS Bogue en route to its new home port at Saipan, Mariana Islands. Upon arrival, the squadron began semi-weekly mail and passenger flights to Truk. Detachments were deployed as needed at Kwajalein; Truk; Eniwetok; Yokosuka, Japan; Qingdao, China; Okinawa; Hong Kong; and NS Sangley Point, Philippines.
- 1 February 1948: A six-plane detachment from VP-MS-6 operated at Eniwetok under Joint Task Force 7 in Operation Sandstone during nuclear weapons testing.
- 26 March 1949: VP-46 relieved VP-41 on station in the China and Japan areas, establishing three-plane detachments at Qingdao and Yokosuka. Operational control was under FAW-1 at NAS Agana, Guam.
- 1 July 1949: VP-46 was transferred to a new home port at NAS San Diego, California, arriving and reporting for duty under FAW-14 on 23 July 1949.
- 13 November 1949: VP-46 deployed to Magdalena Bay, California, with VP-47 for combined ASW competitive and advanced base operations, tended by USS Pine Island.
- 15 June – December 1950: VP-46 was the first seaplane squadron to be deployed for combat aerial patrols off the China Coast and the Formosa Strait during the Korean War. The squadron began flying combat operations from the Pescadores based on board USS Suisun on 31 July 1950. On 1 December 1950, VP-46 was redeployed to NS Sangley Point, to conduct24-hour reconnaissance of China coastal waters from south of Swatow north to the Saddle Islands. A patrol detachment was supported during the deployment at Buckner Bay, Okinawa, and a courier detachment at NS Sangley Point. During the tour the squadron completed 3,583 hours of flying.
- 26 September 1951: The squadron departed for WestPac on board USS Floyds Bay and USS Gardiners Bay. VP-46 operated from NAF Iwakuni, Japan, under FAW6, as part of the Search and Patrol Group of TG 96.2, conducting ASW, over-water search and reconnaissance, and rescue missions. During this period VP-46 operated a detachment from an advanced base at Chinhae, Korea, tended by USS Suisun.
- 1 March 1953: The squadron deployed for its third tour in the Korean combat zone, based at NAF Iwakuni, Japan, aboard USS Kenneth Whiting. Patrols were flown over the Formosa Straits and eastern Korean coastal waters until the cessation of hostilities in July 1953.
- September 1953: VP-46 turned in its PBM-5, PBM-5S and PBM-5S2 aircraft for new P5M-1 Marlin seaplanes.
- 31 January – August 1961: VP-46 received its first P-2V Neptune, completing the transition on 24 August 1961.
- 6 January 1964: VP-46 became the first Pacific Fleet patrol squadron to transition into the new P-3A Orion.
- 5 January 1966: VP-46 deployed to NAF Naha, Okinawa, with a detachment of six aircraft at NS Sangley Point, relieving VP-9. The squadron was under the operational control of CTG 72.2 and the administrative control of FAWs 8 and 10. The detachment aircraft participated around the clock in Vietnamese coastal surveillance as a part of Operation Market Time.
- 19 December 1966: The squadron trained at the Pacific Missile Range, Point Mugu, California, in the use of the AGM-12 Bullpup air-to-surface missile.
- 26 May 1968: The first contingent of VP-46 aircraft arrived at NAS Adak, Alaska, for a six-month deployment, relieving VP-9. Duties consisted of tracking numerous Soviet submarine and surface vessels. On 6 July, the crew of a squadron aircraft on a routine flight reported sighting a reentry vehicle descending. It was later confirmed as a Soviet missile test in the Kamchatka target range.
- 1 October 1969: VP-46 deployed to WestPac at NS Sangley Point, with a detachment at NAF Cam Ranh Bay, South Vietnam.
- 1December 1970: VP-46 deployed to NAS Adak, AK for a six-month deployment, which included a detachment to NAS Agana, Guam.
- 1 February 1972: VP-46 began its final deployment to the Vietnamese theatre of operations, based at MCAS Iwakuni, Japan, with a detachment at NAS Cubi Point, Philippines.
- 4 January 1977: First VP-46 crews began the transition to the new P-3C Update I aircraft.
- March 1980: VP-46 deployed to NAS Keflavik, Iceland, a rarity for a Pacific Fleet patrol squadron, coming under the operational control of Commander Second Fleet. During the deployment, the squadron participated in numerous NATO exercises in addition to normal duties involving tracking Russian submarines.
- 27 July 1983: VP-46 deployed to Diego Garcia as the first full patrol squadron deployment to the Indian Ocean. During the deployment, the squadron participated in numerous exercises with NATO and SEATO allies in the Gulf of Aden, South Pacific and Sea of Japan.
- February – March 1986: Squadron P-3C UI aircraft received the Block Modification II Retrofit at NAS Moffett Field, California. It incorporated the latest in avionics and weapons systems, including a turret-mounted infrared detection device which dropped out of the nose to identify targets by day or night and AGM-84A Harpoon missile capability.
- 2 January 1988: VP-46 made a full squadron split deployment to Dhahran Saudi Arabia, Diego Garcia and Masirah Oman with the first P-3 aircraft equipped with the "Combat Gray" paint scheme and infrared anti-missile defense pods.
- August 1989: VP-46 deployed to Misawa, Japan. This was the last squadron deployment focused mainly on anti-submarine warfare.
- April 1990: VP-46 made the transition to the P3 UIII aircraft.
- 1 January 1991: A four-crew/three-aircraft rotating detachment was deployed to NAS Cubi Point, elements of which were deployed to Al Masirah, Oman, in support of Operations Desert Shield and Desert Storm.
- October 1991: VP-46 Made a split deployment to Kadena Japan, Diego Garcie and Masirah Oman.
- 14 November 1993: VP-46 was transferred from NAS Moffett Field to NAS Whidbey Island, Washington, due to the scheduled closure of the former facility. Since then, VP-46 has completed over 46 years and more than 300,046 hours of accident-free flight operations, a Pacific Fleet record.
- April 2003: A P-3C Orion from VP-46, flying in support of Operation Iraqi Freedom becomes the first navy aircraft to land at Baghdad International Airport.
- 1 June 2018: VP-46 was awarded the Commander Naval Air Forces Pacific's "Blair Pepper Lightcap" Pilot Proficiency Training Award for fiscal year 2017 and 2018.
- April 2019: VP-46 return to home from its final deployment with the P-3C and begin the transition to the P-8 A Poseidon.

== Aircraft assignments ==
The squadron was assigned the following aircraft, effective on the dates shown:

- PM-2 - July 1931
- P2Y-1 - June 1933
- P2Y-2 - 1936
- PBY-3 - 1938
- PBY-5 - January 1942
- PBM-3C - December 1942
- PBM-5E - January 1945
- PBM-5S2 - July 1951
- P5M-1 - September 1953
- P-2V-5F - January 1961
- P-2V-7/SP-2H - November 1961
- P-3A - January 1963
- P-3B - August 1966
- P-3C UI - January 1977
- P-3C UII - February 1986
- P-3C UIII - March 1990
- P-3C UIIIR - 1993
- P-8A - 2019

== Home port assignments ==
The squadron was assigned to these home ports, effective on the dates shown:

- NAS Coco Solo, Panama Canal Zone - 1 July 1931
- NAS San Diego, California - 1 February 1932
- NAS Coco Solo - 22 April 1933
- NAS Guantanamo Bay, Cuba - 1 April 1944
- NAS Norfolk, Virginia - 7 July 1944
- NAS Alameda, California - 11 April 1945
- NAAS Harvey Point, North Carolina - 30 June 1945
- NAB Saipan, Marianas - 12 September 1945
- NAS San Diego - 1 July 1949
- NAS Moffett Field, California - 1 January 1964
- NAS Whidbey Island, Washington - 14 November 1993

== See also ==
- History of the United States Navy
- List of United States Navy aircraft squadrons
- List of squadrons in the Dictionary of American Naval Aviation Squadrons
- List of Lockheed P-3 Orion variants
