= VPB-23 =

Patrol Bombing Squadron 23
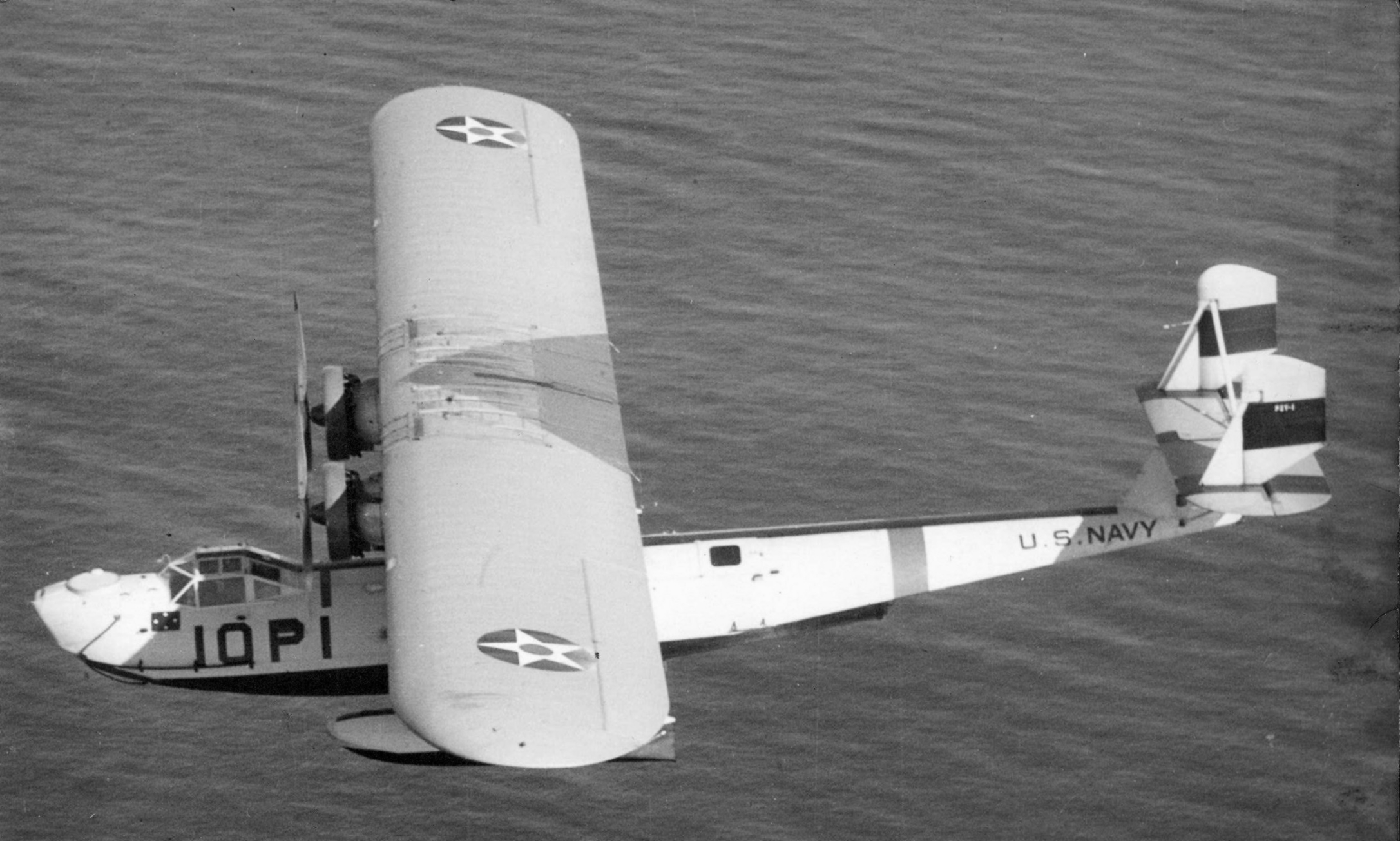
- VP-10F P2Y in the 1930s
- Active: 1 July 1930 – 25 January 1946
- Country: United States of America
- Branch: United States Navy
- Type: squadron
- Role: Maritime patrol
- Engagements: World War II

Aircraft flown
- Patrol: T4M; PM-1; P2Y-1/2/3; PBY-2/5/5A

VPB-23 was a patrol bombing squadron of the U.S. Navy. The squadron was established as Patrol Squadron 10-S (VP-10S) on 1 July 1930, redesignated Patrol Squadron 10-F (VP-10F) on 17 July 1933, redesignated Patrol Squadron 10 (VP-10) on 1 October 1937, redesignated Patrol Squadron 25 (VP-25) on 1 July 1939, redesignated Patrol Squadron 23 (VP-23) on 1 August 1941, redesignated Patrol Bombing Squadron 23 (VPB-23) on 1 October 1944 and disestablished on 25 January 1946.

== Operational history ==
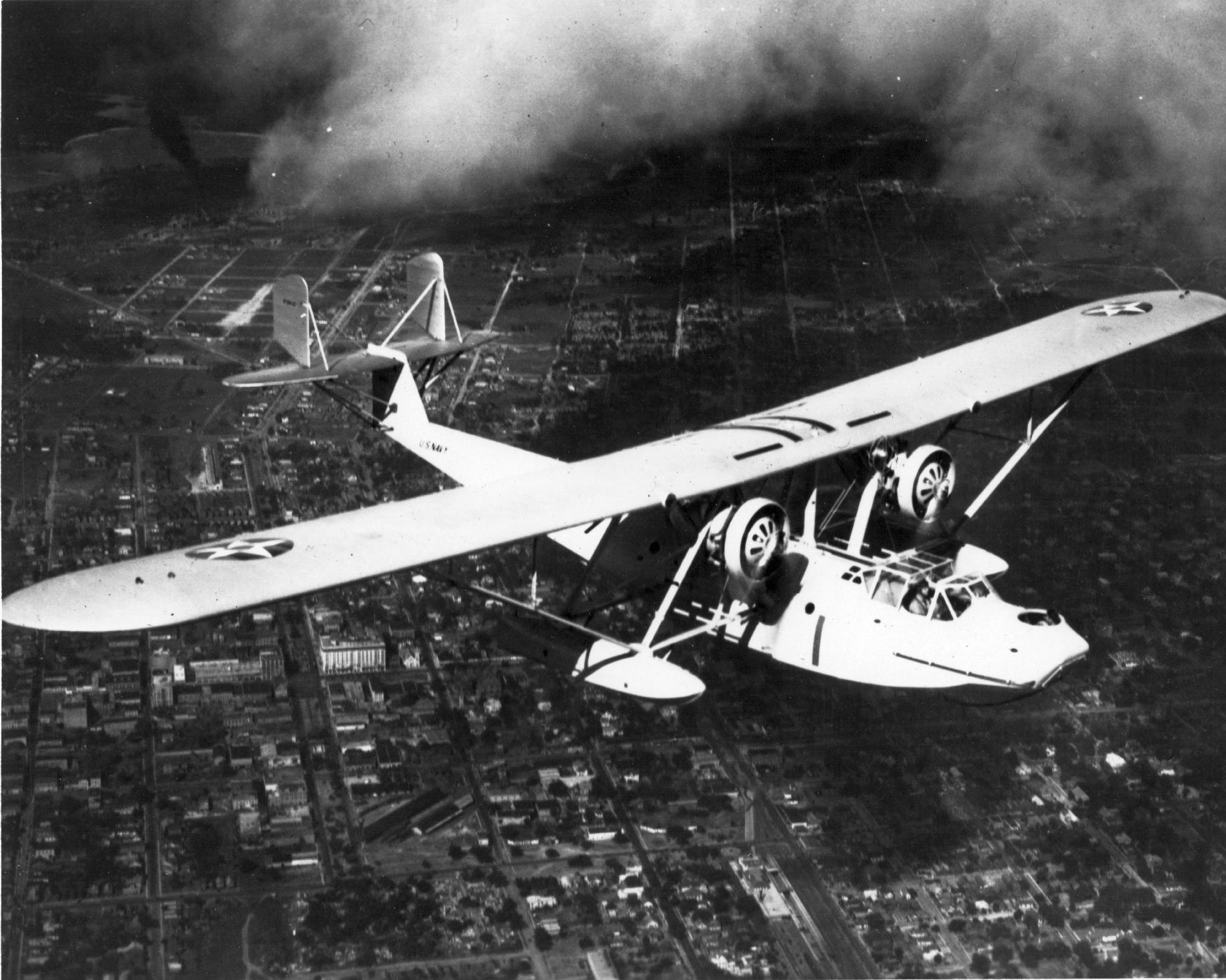
VP-10S P2Y in 1932

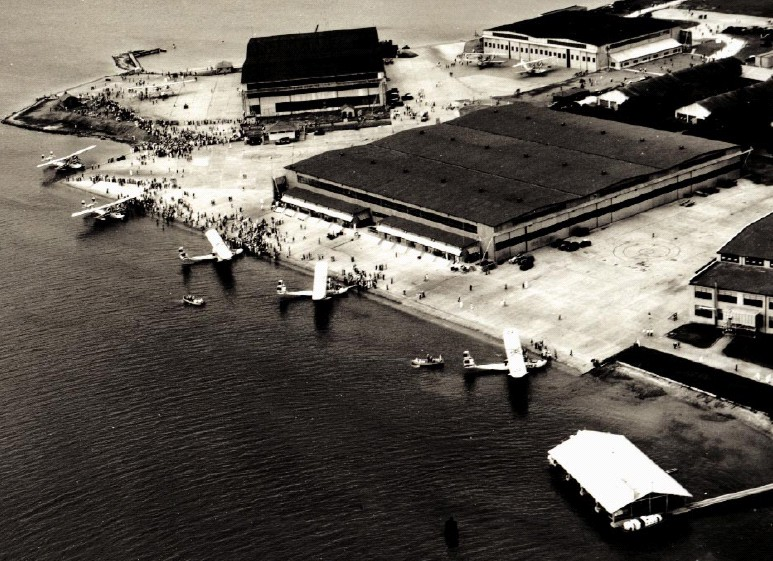
VP-10F P2Ys at Ford Island in 1934

- 1 July 1930: Torpedo Squadron NINE-S (VT-9S) was redesignated at NAS Hampton Roads, Virginia, and the assets of the squadron were utilized to form Patrol Squadron 10S under the operational control of the Scouting Fleet.
- 1 September 1930: The squadron's twin-float T4M torpedo bombers were turned in for PM-1 flying boats. Tender support for the squadron's six PM-1 aircraft was provided by USS Wright.
- 8 February 1931: VP-10S participated in Fleet Problem XII with VP-8, VP-3 and VP-5 in the Caribbean. Squadrons were based ashore at Guantanamo Bay Naval Base, Cuba, and provided with tender support from USS Wright, USS Swan and USS Whitney while at sea. The patrol squadrons were involved in exercises testing concepts of strategic scouting in both the attack on and protection of the Panama Canal. The greater range of the PM-1 led the planners to call for patrol sectors that were too ambitious, resulting in many units of the opposition forces passing unseen through the patrolled areas.
- 1 January 1932: VP-10S once again participated in fleet exercises in the Caribbean, but on a smaller scale. On this occasion VP-8S was the only other squadron taking part in the training.
- 1 February 1932: VP-10S was reassigned a new permanent home base at FAB Coco Solo, Panama Canal Zone. Tender support continued to be supplied by USS Wright.
- 1 April 1933: VP-10S and the other squadrons at NAS Coco Solo (VP-2S, VP-3S and VP-5S) were reorganized from Scouting Fleet to Base Force. VP-10S was redesignated VP-10F with six P2Y-1 aircraft, supported by USS Swan and USS Lapwing.
- 10 January 1934: Six P2Y-1 aircraft of VP-10F, Lieutenant Commander Knefler McGinnis commanding, made a historic nonstop formation flight from San Francisco, California, to Pearl Harbor, Hawaii, in 24 hours 35 minutes. The flight bettered the best previous time for the crossing; exceeded the best distance of previous mass flights; and broke a nine-day-old world record for distance in a straight line for Class C seaplanes with a new mark of 2,399 miles (3,861 km).
- 13 January 1934: VP-10F was permanently reassigned to NAS Pearl Harbor, exchanging aircraft with VP-5F at San Diego before reporting there. VPs 10F and 8F from Coco Solo and VPs 1F, 4F and VP-6F from Pearl Harbor participated in the Hawaiian Exercises, supported by tender USS Wright.
- 22 April 1935: VPs 7F, 9F, 1F, 4F, 6F, 8F and 10F participated in Fleet Problem XV near Midway Island.
- 1 October 1937: VP-10F was redesignated VP-10 when the patrol squadrons came under the operational control of PatWing 2.
- 18 January 1938: VPs 10 and 9 conducted a historic ferry flight with 18 PBY-2 aircraft from NAS San Diego to Pearl Harbor, Hawaii, without mishap. The crews of VP-9 returned to San Diego aboard SS Matsonia. The flight and the route later became the standard for the trans-Pacific flight made by all squadrons en route to the South Pacific from the United States.
- 25 Mar 1938: Aircraft of VPs 1, 4, 6, 8, 10 and 18 participated in Fleet Problem XIX (Phase V) as part of Red Force operating against Blue Force. The exercises demonstrated that slow patrol aircraft were extremely vulnerable to anti-aircraft (AA) fire from ships being attacked. During the exercise, the majority of aircraft participating were judged to have been shot down by the AA screen before reaching their intended targets.
- 1 July 1939: VP-10, flying 12 PBY-2s, was redesignated VP-25, still home based at Pearl Harbor under PatWing 2.
- 9 April 1940: Aircraft of VPs 21, 22, 23, 24, 25 and 26 participated in Fleet Problem XXI with the USAAF 72nd Bombardment Squadron and the 4th Reconnaissance Squadron. The purpose of the exercise was to test the ability of aircraft to defend the Hawaiian Islands against an enemy carrier attack. The results of the fleet problem indicated that there were significant deficiencies in the coordination between the air arms of the two services in defense of the islands. Unfortunately, these deficiencies were not corrected in time to either prevent the coming attack on Pearl Harbor, or organize any defense during the attack.
- 8 November 1941: VP-23 flew its older model PBY-2 aircraft to San Diego, where new PBY-5 aircraft were picked up at the factory. Two weeks of familiarization training was given to the aircrews before returning to Hawaii.
- 23 November 1941: Upon return to Ford Island, Oahu, the crews of VP-23 began two weeks of intensive battle maneuvers to thoroughly familiarize them with the capabilities of the new PBY-5 aircraft.
- 7 December 1941: Two detachments of aircraft had been sent to Johnston Island and Palmyra Island the day before, and on the 7th began to practice circular patrol pattern searches. On that same morning, Japanese carrier forces attacked Pearl Harbor, destroying eight of the squadron's aircraft in their hangars on Ford Island.
- 25 December 1941: The two detachments of squadron aircraft remained at Johnston Island conducting search sweeps in the event of the return of the Japanese fleet. Back at Oahu, Ensign Brady and his crew claimed one Japanese submarine. Postwar records, however, do not indicate any enemy submarine losses on that date.
- 16 January 1942: Six aircraft of VP-23 temporarily based at Kanton Island began daily searches of the waters between Kanton Island and the Fijis to protect the advance of Task Force 8 as it prepared for its strike against the Marshall and Gilbert Islands. These were the first combat patrols by U.S. aircraft in the South Pacific.
- 26 May 1942: A detachment of squadron aircraft at Midway participated in the patrols searching for the Japanese invasion force expected from intercepted radio traffic. The first sightings occurred on 3 June 1942 and led to the Battle of Midway. All of the squadron aircraft returned safely to Ford Island on 30 June 1942.
- 8 July 1942: VP-23 was deployed to Noumea, New Caledonia, to support the invasion of Guadalcanal, relieving VP-71. Tender support was provided by USS Curtiss.
- 15 July 1942: the squadron was moved forward to the island of Espiritu Santo.
- 25 July 1942: VP-23 combed Tulagi Island, the first target in the bombing campaign conducted by the squadron against Japanese-held positions.
- 6 August 1942: Lieutenant Maurice Smith and his crew of seven were reported missing after a patrol flown out of Espiritu Santo. On 14 January 1994, a team of loggers discovered the remains of the aircraft, BuNo. 2389, and its crew where they had crashed on a ridge of a hill on the island of Espiritu Santo.
- 7 August 1942: A nine-plane detachment of VP-23 was deployed to Malaita Island to support operations at Guadalcanal, with tender support provided by USS Mackinac. Severe losses by the Allies at the Battle of Savo Island forced the return of the detachment to Espiritu Santo on 9 August 1942.
- 10 August 1942: A six-plane detachment was sent to Nendo Island, Santa Cruz Islands.
- 1 October 1942: VP-23 and its detachments were recalled to Luganville Seaplane Base, Espiritu Santo for return to NAS Kaneohe Bay for rest and refit.
- 1 November 1942: Two detachments of squadron aircraft were sent to Kanton and Midway islands for search patrol rotations.
- 30 May 1943: Twelve new PBY aircraft arrived from San Diego as replacements, and six of the aircrews ferrying the aircraft remained with the squadron as replacements. Training of the new crews was begun in conjunction with operational patrols in Hawaiian waters.
- 24 June 1943: VP-23 again deployed to the South Pacific, returning to its former base of operations at Espiritu Santo. A detachment was deployed to the island of Funafuti.
- 20 August 1943: The squadron base of operations was relocated to NAB Halavo, Florida Islands. From this location the squadron conducted special searches, convoy coverage, antishipping patrols, Dumbo (air-sea rescue) and aerial resupply missions.
- 15 September 1943: A squadron PBY-5 piloted by Lieutenant W. J. Geritz spotted a submarine southeast of San Cristobal. The destroyer USS Saufley assisted in the sinking of the submarine. Postwar records indicate the submarine sunk was Ro-101 and the entire crew of 50 was lost.
- 18 September 1943: VP-23 conducted a bombing attack on Japanese positions at Nauru Island.
- 10 December 1943: VP-23 was relieved at NAB Halavo by VP-14. The squadron transferred to Espiritu Santo on 13 December 1943, in preparation for the return flight to NAS Kaneohe Bay.
- 15 February 1944: The squadron personnel of VP-23 boarded USS Kasaan Bay for return to the continental United States. The squadron arrived at NAS San Diego on 23 February 1943. Reassignments of personnel, home leaves, and other administrative details were taken care of upon arrival.
- 1 March 1944: VP-23 was reformed with new personnel and new equipment at NAS San Diego. Training commenced immediately and continued through mid-June 1944.20 Jun 1944: The squadron flew the trans-Pacific flight from San Diego to Kaneohe Bay, in the new amphibious version of the Catalina, the PBY-5A. All aircraft arrived safely and the squadron began operations on 30 June, sending a six-aircraft detachment to Midway for training in Anti-submarine warfare (ASW)
- 29 July 1944: The Kaneohe detachment of six aircraft relieved the Midway detachment. This group returned to Kaneohe on 16 August 1944.
- 20 August 1944: VP-23 was deployed to the island of Eniwetok. From this naval air base searches were conducted to the northern and western approaches of the island. Periodic reconnaissance flights were conducted to Ponape and Wake islands.
- 10 September 1944: Group 1, FAW-2 was relieved by FAW- 1 while VP-23 was based on NAB Eniwetok. Operational control of the squadron was undertaken by TU 96.1.7.
- 30 November 1944: VPB-23 conducted a bombing attack on Japanese positions on Wake Island.
- 4 December 1944: Twelve squadron aircraft were transferred to Saipan; three aircraft remained at Eniwetok to provide search patrol support to FAW- 1. Upon arrival at Saipan on 5 December, a detachment of three aircraft was sent to Orote Field, Guam, for air-sea rescue work, and another detachment of two aircraft was assigned to the Army Air Corps for air-sea rescue work. The remaining squadron aircraft conducted flight operations from Tanapag Harbor, Saipan, with headquarters ashore under the operational command of TU 94.4.2.
- 7 December 1944: A third detachment of two aircraft was sent to Falalop Airfield, Ulithi, for air-sea rescue missions.
- 27 December 1944: A fourth detachment of two aircraft relieved the VPB-54 detachment at Peleliu. The primary mission was provision of air-sea rescue support for elements of TU 94.4.2.
- 1 February 1945: Detachments of VPB-23 were maintained at NAS Agana, Guam; Isley Field #2, Saipan; Falalop Airfield, Ulithi; and Peleliu Airfield, Palau Islands. Operational control was under TU 94.4.2 with a primary mission of air-sea rescue, Dumbo and ferry flights.
- 14 February 1945: Detachments of VPB-23 were maintained at NAS Agana, Guam; Kobler Field, Saipan; Falalop Airfield; Peleliu Airfield; Iwo Jima, Nanpo Shoto. Operational control was under TU 94.11.2, with the primary missions being Dumbo flights, press flights and antishipping patrols.
- 1 March 1945: Three crews of VPB-23 were detached from the Saipan detachment for return to the continental U.S. via NAS Kaneohe Bay.
- 21 March 1945: The VPB-23 detachment at Peleliu was relieved by a detachment from VPB-108.
- 30 March 1945: Daily ferry and resupply flights between Guam and Kerama Rhetto were begun by the Guam detachment.
- 9 April 1945: The Eniwetok detachment of three aircraft returned to VPB-23 at Saipan.
- 20 June 1945: The detachment at Falalop Airfield was augmented by three more aircraft. Nightly antishipping patrols and Dumbo missions were conducted in support of TU 94.11.2 operations.
- 9 July 1945: The base of operations for VPB-23 on Saipan was transferred to Peleliu Airfield, to provide air-sea rescue in support of Army Air Corps B-29 strikes on the Japanese home islands. Air-sea rescue missions were also provided in support of United States Marine Corps air strikes on Japanese positions of bypassed islands.
- 1 September 1945: Detachments were maintained at Peleliu Airfield, Falalop Airfield and NAS Agana. Primary missions conducted consisted of air-sea rescue work, anti-mine sweeps and leaflet drops on bypassed Japanese held islands.
- 11 December 1945: The detachment at Orote was transferred to NAS Agana, Guam.
- 13 December 1945: Squadron operations were ended and all detachments were returned to Tanapag Harbor, Saipan. Shortly thereafter, the squadron departed Saipan to return to San Diego, via NAS Kaneohe Bay.
- 25 January 1946: VPB-23 was disestablished at NAS San Diego.

== Aircraft assignments ==
The squadron was assigned to these home ports, effective on the dates shown:

- T4M - July 1930
- PM-1 - September 1930
- P2Y-1 - April 1933
- P2Y-2 - 1936
- P2Y-3 - 1937
- PBY-2 - January 1938
- PBY-5 - November 1941
- PBY-5A - June 1944

== Home port assignments ==
The squadron was assigned to these home ports, effective on the dates shown:

- NAS Hampton Roads, Virginia - 1 July 1930
- FAB Coco Solo, Panama Canal Zone - 1 February 1932
- NAS Pearl Harbor, Hawaii - 13 January 1934
- NAS San Diego, California - 23 February 1944
- NAS Kaneohe Bay, Hawaii - 20 June 1944
- NAS San Diego - December 1945

== See also ==
- Maritime patrol aircraft
- List of inactive United States Navy aircraft squadrons
- List of United States Navy aircraft squadrons
- List of squadrons in the Dictionary of American Naval Aviation Squadrons
- History of the United States Navy
