= Earl Schuyler Kleinhans =

Earl Schuyler (Sky) Kleinhans
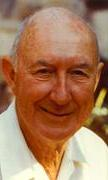
- Born: February 3, 1905; Pittsburgh, Pennsylvania, U.S.
- Died: September 21, 1996 (aged 91); Irvine, California, U.S.
- Education: Massachusetts Institute of Technology
- Occupation: Aeronautical engineer
- Known for: Flying boat and Douglas Aircraft airplane designs
- Awards: AIAA Fellow

Earl Schuyler (Sky) Kleinhans (February 3, 1905 – September 21, 1996) was an American airplane and flying boat aeronautical engineering pioneer with primary experience at Sikorsky and Douglas Aircraft where he advanced over a 36-year career to become chief engineer and retired as the chairman of the scientific advisory board in 1969 for McDonnell Douglas.

== Early life ==
Some of the engineering talent of Sky Kleinhans was inherited. He was born in Pittsburgh, Pennsylvania, the son of a designer of large rolling mill machinery for steel mills. One day when Sky was about 3½ years old he was traveling with his father (Frank Brasil Kleinhans) when their buggy was sandwiched between two streetcars his father was killed and young Sky was ejected from the accident.

Sky started at the Pittsburgh Academy in the fifth grade, then in 1916 his family moved to California, where he graduated from Hollywood High in 1922. Then he continued his education at the University of Southern California Branch (now UCLA) then transferred to UC Berkeley where he majored in chemistry. He joined the Alpha Kappa Lambda fraternity there. In 1924 he attended Massachusetts Institute of Technology, switching to math, physics and anything to do with aircraft or boats, where he earned a BS in mathematics in 1927.

== Aviation career ==
After graduation in the summer 1927, he started work at Keystone Aircraft in Bristol Pennsylvania to develop Felixstowe F5L flying boats, an aircraft designed by John Cyril Porte at the Seaplane Experimental Station in England.

Then there was a series of aircraft design jobs with fledgling airplane firms including Metal Aircraft Corporation Flamingo of Cincinnati Ohio, where Sky was assistant chief engineer during the summer 1929 – December 1929. He worked on the Flamingo made famous as the airplane that flew Jimmie Angel to discover with worlds highest waterfall Angel Falls. Sometimes in those early years an aircraft can be designed, built and test flown in four to five months.

At Sikorsky Aviation Corporation, Stratford Connecticut, Sky was in charge of the XP3S1 aircraft development, the Sikorsky S-38 and the Navy's XSS-1 and XSS-2, an experimental scout-observation flying-boats. Often he helped with the design of the Sikorsky S-40, Sikorsky S-41 and Sikorsky S-42.

Sky started work in the summer of 1933 at the Douglas Aircraft Company hired by James H. Kindelberger (Dutch) and he was put in charge of all flying boats as a project engineer. In 1935 he was appointed assistant chief designer for all of Douglas Aircraft, including the B-19 and DC-4. From 1937 to 1940 he was promoted to chief designer, and when World War II started in 1941 he became assistant chief engineer, Edward F. Burton (designer of the Douglas DC-3) was now chief engineer, but by 1960 Sky became chief engineer then director of research and engineering. His last position was chairman of the scientific advisory board until his retirement in 1967.

== Aircraft designs ==
After his seaplane and flying boat work at Douglas, he became very involved in transport aircraft the entire DC-3 through DC-9 series. His airplane design philosophy was driven by a combination of function and airline requirements embodied in five key points.

- First—Capacity up by 50%
- Second—Operating cost reduced by 20%, this improves airline revenue
- Third—Performance 20% improvement in speed and range
- Fourth—Comfort, interiors had to look and feel different
- Safety—Bad-weather aids, autopilots, thrust reversers, brakes

Throughout Douglas' long transportation history, no new aeroplane has been marketed that was not an improvement in each of these five cardinal points over the type it was designed to replace.

During his career Sky Kleinhans designed, assisted with the design, or managed a design team for the following aircraft.

- Keystone PK-1, derived from the Felixstowe F5L
- Sikorsky S-38
- Sikorsky XSS-1 and XSS-2, an experimental scout-observation flying-boats with folding wings
- Sikorsky S-40
- Sikorsky S-41
- Sikorsky S-42
- Douglas XB-19
- Douglas DC-4E
- Douglas DC-4
- Douglas DC-6
- Douglas DC-7
- Douglas XB-42 Mixmaster
- Douglas XB-43 Jetmaster
- Douglas DC-8
- McDonnell Douglas DC-9
- Douglas X-3 Stiletto

== Family ==
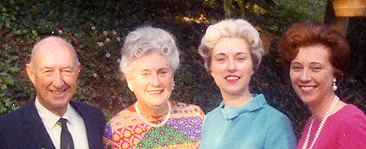

Sky married Virginia Winterstein in Bristol Pennsylvania in 1928 and they had two daughters: Charlotte Kleinhans Wood, and Letitia Kleinhans Aaron.

== Honors and legacy ==
- AIAA Fellow
