= USS Pelican (AM-27) =

Minesweeper of the United States Navy

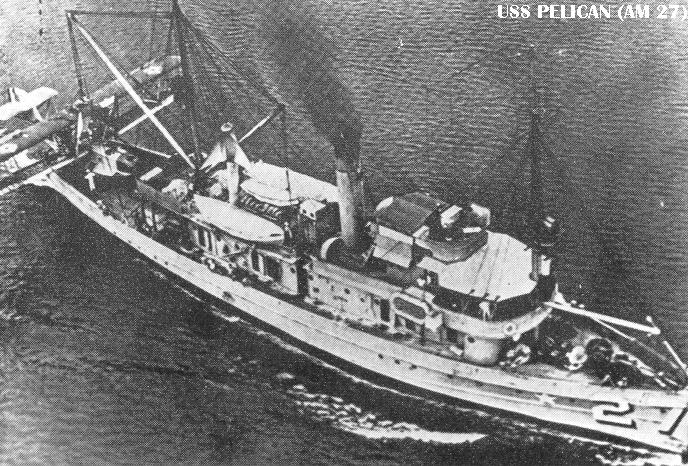

History

United States
- Name: USS Pelican
- Builder: Gas Engine and Power Co., Morris Heights, New York
- Laid down: 10 November 1917
- Launched: 12 June 1918
- Commissioned: 10 October 1918, as Minesweeper No.27
- Decommissioned: 30 November 1945
- Reclassified: AM-27, 17 July 1920; AVP-6, 22 January 1936
- Stricken: 19 December 1945
- Fate: Sold for scrap, November 1946

General characteristics
- Class & type: Lapwing-class minesweeper
- Displacement: 840 long tons (853 t)
- Length: 187 ft 10 in (57.25 m)
- Beam: 35 ft 5 in (10.80 m)
- Draft: 8 ft 10 in (2.69 m)
- Speed: 14 knots (26 km/h; 16 mph)
- Complement: 85
- Armament: 2 × 3 in (76 mm) guns

USS Pelican (AM-27/AVP-6) was an Lapwing-class minesweeper acquired by the United States Navy for the dangerous task of removing mines from minefields laid in the water to prevent ships from passing.

Pelican was laid down 10 November 1917 at Gas Engine and Power Co., Morris Heights, New York; launched 12 June 1918; sponsored by Miss E. B. Patterson; and commissioned 10 October 1918.

Some career highlights include helping to clean up the North Sea Mine Barrage in 1919;the ship was severely damaged in that operation. After being repaired, the ship was operated in the Pacific in the interwar period. Finally, the ship was used in operations in the North Atlantic during World War II.

== Post World War I mine clearance operations ==
Upon completion of fitting out, she sailed for Scotland on 6 April 1919, to assist in the sweeping of the North Sea Mine Barrage. Arriving 20 April, she and other minesweepers immediately went to work in sweeping mines.

World War I ended on 11 November 1918

=== 9 July 1919 incident ===
During this service Pelican's naval career almost ended when it had hardly begun. While sweeping several mines, one of them exploded underneath her hull causing her to take on a great amount of water and slowly settle by the head. Despite heavy seas, and threat of imminent sinking, Pelican's crew, with the assistance of two of her sister ships, and after 19 hours of effort, managed to bring the badly damaged vessel into port at Scapa Flow for temporary repairs.

9 July, however, proved a momentous day. Exploding mines damaged three minesweepers, the tug Patuxent, and a subchaser. Again sweeping in company with USS Eider (AM-17), USS Auk (AM-38) shuddered under the impact of an explosion at 0925 that, in turn, countermined another mine 25 yards off her starboard bow; in a chain reaction, a third explosion (probably caused by the second) rolled the sea 30 yards astern, carrying away the sweep and resulting in the loss of a "kite" and 70 fathoms of precious wire as well. But all these mishaps proved but a preliminary to what transpired soon thereafter.

At 1000, an upper level mine exploded beneath Pelican, which in turn triggered five simultaneous countermines around her. The little ship disappeared in a veritable cloud of spray that, when it subsided, revealed Pelican- heavily hit, battered, and holed-assuming a list before beginning to settle. As the seemingly mortally wounded minesweeper wallowed in the swells, Auk, immediately altered course to close Pelican.

Passing a line at 1008, within 10 minutes of the explosions, Auk drew alongside Pelican. After seeing one hose line part, Auk passed another to aid Pelican in pumping out the rapidly rising water below decks. However, the rough seas repeatedly slammed the ships together, damaging lines and hoses, and forcing their replacement. At 1054, USS Teal (AM-23) passed a towline and began moving ahead with the crippled Pelican, in turn tethered to Auk, astern.

Eider fell in with the group as it labored ahead, securing to Pelican's starboard side, Eider and Auk acting much in the fashion of waterwings, keeping their sister ship afloat between them. Difficulties soon arose, however, as the ships struggled towards Orkney. A head sea sprang up, tossing the minecraft about and straining moorings and hose lines. Pump lines carried away and, soon thereafter-shorn of the means for keeping her afloat-Pelican began to settle further by the bow. The pressure of the water in the flooded forward compartments in the damaged ship now buckled and distorted the forward fireroom bulkhead-the only barrier between Pelican and the sea.

At 2300, Capt. Bulmer of Auk ordered most of Pelican's crew transferred to Eider. A dozen volunteers chosen from the crew (all had stepped forward when asked to hazard staying on board)--all that was absolutely necessary "to care for the ship"-remained on board Pelican. Gradually, however, the pumps of Auk and Eider, working full capacity after the lines had been repaired and again placed in operation, succeeded in lowering Pelican's, waterline. The battle to keep Pelican afloat continued on into the night and into the predawn darkness, men standing by with axes to chop through the mooring lines should Pelican give any indication of imminent sinking.

Finally, on the morning of 10 July 1919, the flotilla limped into Tresness Bay where Auk's pumps continued to help lower Pelican's waterline even further.

Fully repaired at Newcastle upon Tyne, Pelican departed for home, arriving at New York on 6 December 1919.

== Pacific operations ==
Pelican next transferred to the Pacific Fleet and operated out of Pearl Harbor, until decommissioned there 3 May 1922. It was then recommissioned in August 1922 as an airplane tender.

In 1924 the USS Pelican surveyed the French Frigate Shoals in the Pacific Ocean.

== Recommissioning for World War II ==
Recommissioned 17 August, she performed miscellaneous tasks, such as survey work and photography missions, while attached to Naval Air Station, Pearl Harbor. Reclassified AVP-6 on 22 January 1936, Pelican was assigned to Commander, Aircraft, Scouting Force for further duty. The Japanese attack on Pearl Harbor found Pelican on the West Coast.

With the beginning of war, the sturdy little vessel commenced tending aircraft and serving as convoy escort, until May 1943, when she joined the Atlantic Fleet.

=== Transfer to the Atlantic Fleet ===
She alternated tending seaplanes and serving as convoy escort, performing an un-glamorous but vital part of the war effort. Reporting to the Fleet Sound School in March 1945, Pelican assisted in experiments with new ASW gear until October, when she arrived at Charleston Navy Yard.

The ship operated as a Q-ship from 26 May 1942 to 16 April 1943.

== Decommissioning ==
Decommissioned 30 November, she was struck from the Naval Vessel Register 19 December 1945. She was sold for scrap in November 1946.
