= Naval Aircraft Factory PN =

Series of flying boats

PN
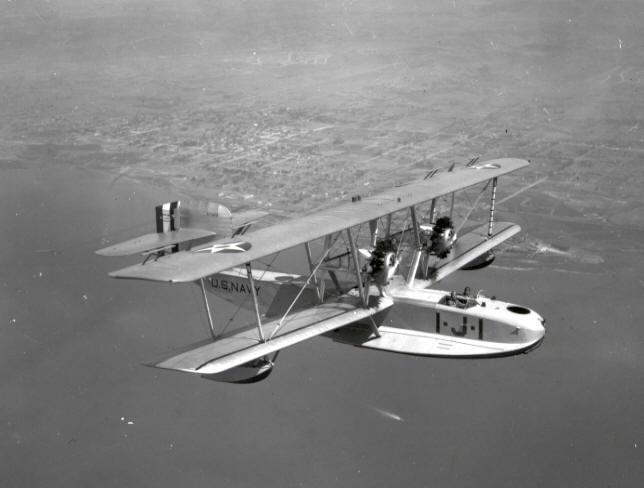
- Naval Aircraft Factory PN-12

General information
- Type: Patrol flying boat
- National origin: United States
- Manufacturer: Naval Aircraft Factory
- Primary user: United States Navy

History
- Retired: 1938 (PK-1)
- Developed from: Felixstowe F5L
- Variant: Hall PH

The Naval Aircraft Factory PN was a series of open cockpit American flying boats of the 1920s and 1930s. A development of the Felixstowe F5L flying boat of the World War I, variants of the PN were built for the United States Navy by Douglas, Keystone and Martin.

== Development and design ==
The PN flying boats were twin-engine biplanes with their engines mounted in nacelles between the fabric-covered wings. Other than on the PN-11 which had a different hull form, the hull had large chines running back to the first step similar to those on the F.5L. It had a standard crew of five, but was capable of carrying a relief crew for long patrols. Early machines had wood hulls and wings, with the wings covered in fabric, while various versions replaced these with metal components. A wide variety of V-12 and radial engines were fitted, due to problems with several of the engines chosen, with later versions generally using radial engines.

At the end of World War I the United States Navy was operating the Curtiss H.16 and the Felixstowe F5L Long-range patrol flying boats, which had been developed in collaboration with the British. The F.5L was a license-built version of the British Felixstowe F.5 using the American Liberty engine. The series of Felixstowe flying boats, developed by the Seaplane Experimental Station, had started with improving the hull of the Curtiss America.

PN-5 was the new designation assigned to F.5Ls built by the Naval Aircraft Factory after 1922, although identical aircraft built before then retained the F.5L designation. Under the new designation system, P indicated that the role was Patrol, and N denoted aircraft built by the US Navy's Naval Aircraft Factory. Numbers 1-4 were skipped.

The PN-6 had an enlarged curved fin with an unbalanced rudder. The first two examples had been ordered as the final two F.5Ls, and had been designated as F.6Ls, with the new PN-6 designation coming into effect in 1922. Some F.5L/PN-5s were later upgraded to PN-6 standard. Neither the PN-5 or the PN-6 designation was used outside of official paperwork, and these aircraft were simply referred to as F.5Ls.

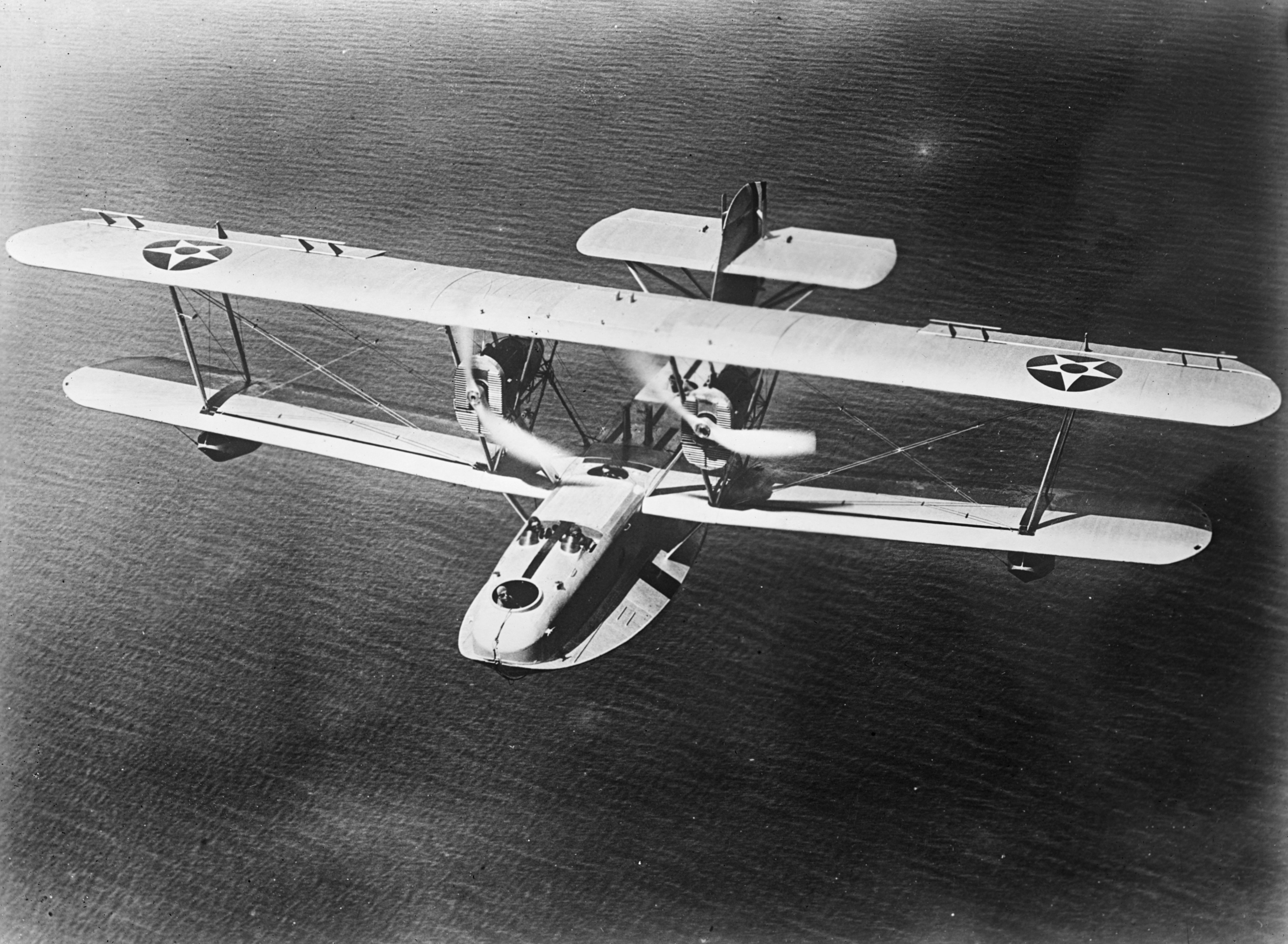
Naval Aircraft Factory PN-9, illustrating the characteristic hull chines

The PN-7 was a 1925 development with an improved thicker section, shorter-span wings with a more modern airfoil section, and were powered by two experimental 525 hp (391 kW) Wright T-2 V-12 engines. Two were built.

The PN-8 was developed due to problems with the wooden hull, which quickly absorbed hundreds of pounds of water and was maintenance intensive, so two aircraft with a metal hull of the same shape as the F.5Ls, and fitted with the new wing, were built. Due to reliability problems with the Wright T-2, they were powered by two 475 hp (354 kW) V-12 Packard 1A-2500 engines.

The two PN-9s were converted from PN-8s, after being fitted with a redesigned broad-chord tail to fix a vibration problem.

Four PN-10s were built, and while similar to the PN-9, each was given a different engine as the Packard 1A-2500 engines were disappointing. One was fitted with Packard 1A-1500 and another with a Packard 3A-1500, both V-12 water-cooled engines and one each was fitted with the Wright R-1820 and Pratt & Whitney R-1690 radial engines. The wings of the first two Packard powered aircraft had a wood structure, while the second pair with the radial engines had wings with a metal structure, both with a fabric covering.

The four PN-11s had a new metal hull with a round turtle deck and lacking the previously characteristic enlarged chines and had a new empennage with twin fins and rudders. One aircraft was fitted with two Wright R-1750 radial engines, while one aircraft were fitted with two Pratt & Whitney R-1690 radial engines as the XPN-11, which was later redesignated as the XP4N-1. Two aircraft were fitted with Wright R-1820 radial engines and while ordered as an XP4N-1 were designated as the XP4N-2 when they entered service.

The two metal wing radial-engine powered PN-10s were redesignated as PN-12s, which combined the revised wings of the PN-7 but reverted to the metal hull of the PN-8 with the enlarged chines and was fitted with the more reliable radial engines. The fin was further enlarged, with a straight leading edge. It would see extensive production to re-equip the Navy's patrol squadrons.

As the production capacity of the Naval Aircraft Factory was limited, production was contracted out to several aircraft companies, with versions being built by Douglas as the PD-1, by Keystone as the PK-1 and by Martin as the PM-1 and PM-2. These each had their own differences from the PN-12, as the Keystone PK-1 and Martin PM-2 the twin fins and rudders of the PN-11, while the PM-1 and PM-2 also had an enclosed cockpit, and the PK-1 had a modified hull form with a sharper bow.

These also formed the basis for the Hall PH flying boats, with a different hull fitted with an enclosed cockpit, and some of these remained in service until World War II.

== Operational history ==
The early prototypes of PN sea planes were used in a series of long-distance flights. During the afternoon of 31 August 1925, an attempt was made to fly a pair of PN-9 planes non-stop from San Francisco to Hawaii, a distance of nearly 2,400 miles (3,864 km) — a trip anticipated to take 26 hours to complete. The first plane to start was forced to land 300 miles (480 km) outside of San Francisco due to a failure of oil pressure, with the crew rescued by the destroyer USS William Jones and the aircraft towed back to port.

The second PN-9 to depart, captained by U.S. Navy Commander John Rodgers, flew 1,841 miles (2,963 km) before running out of fuel when anticipated tailwinds that would have slowed gasoline consumption did not materialize. The plane was unable to make contact with the naval airplane tender USS Aroostook, a ship stationed along the PN-9's flight path and was forced to land at sea when both engines stopped functioning. With power lost, the plane was unable to send or receive radio signals. Although this was at the time a new distance record for seaplanes, the plane remained hundreds of miles short of the nearest landfall and the situation of the crew, with limited quantities of food and water, appeared dire.

Since seas were moderate, the decision was made to attempt to sail the plane to Hawaii. The crew then rigged crude sails made from fabric torn from the aircraft's wings and sailed the aircraft a further 450 miles (720 km), finally being spotted on the ninth day about 15 miles (24 km) off the southeast coast of the Hawaiian island of Kauai. In the aftermath of the headline-grabbing rescue, Commander Rogers was promoted to the position of Assistant Chief of the Navy's Bureau of Aeronautics. PN-9 No. 1, the same plane sailed to Hawaii, did not fare as well, later ditching in the Caribbean Sea during an attempted long-distance flight to South America and subsequently sunk as a navigation hazard.

The two PN-12s were also used to set various records, including range and speed over circuit records.

The various production derivatives of the PN-12 entered service with the US Navy from 30 April 1928, when VP-7D received its first Douglas PD-1, remaining in service until July 1938, when the last Keystone PK-1 was retired.

Three Martin PM-1s were also supplied to the Brazilian Navy in 1930, and used in bombing raids during the 1932 revolution.

== Variants ==
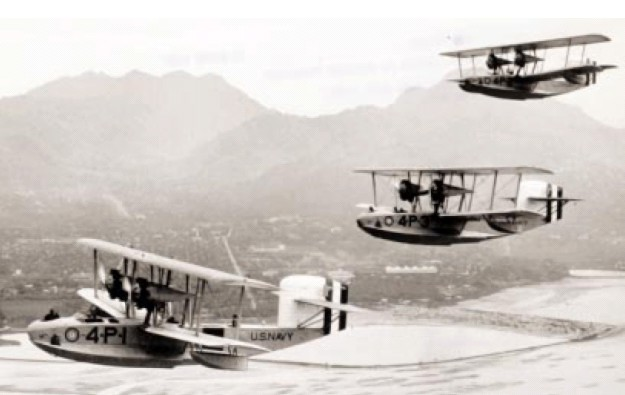
Douglas PD-1s of VP-4 over Hawaii, in 1930

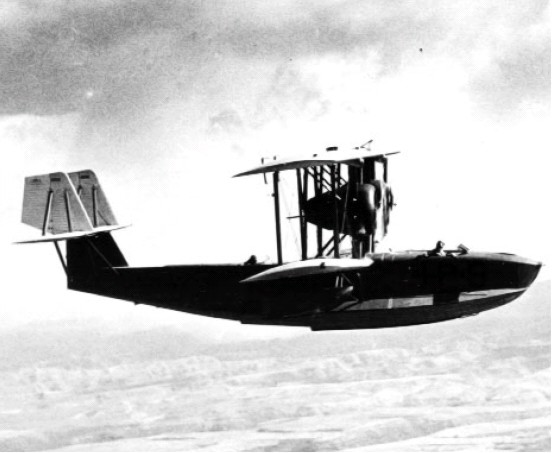
A Keystone PK-1

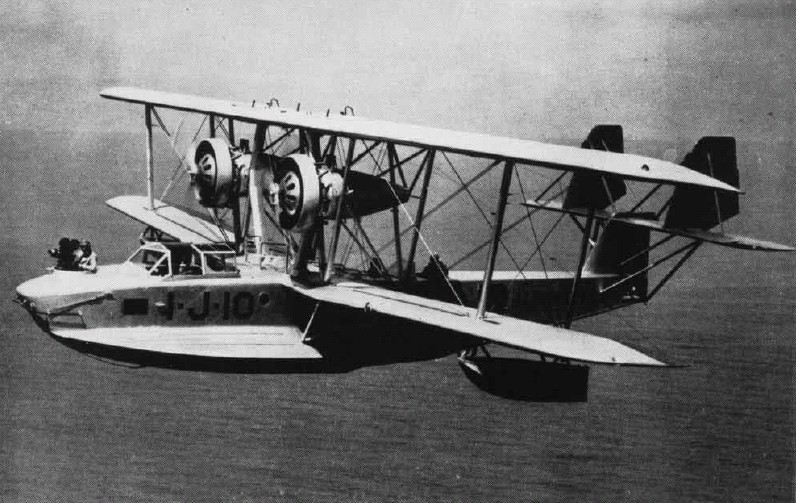
A Martin PM-2 of VJ-1

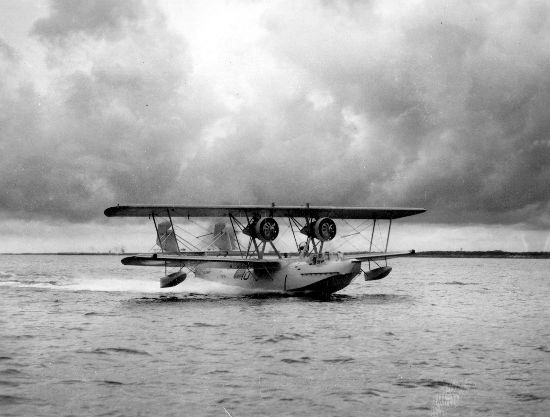
XP4N-1 taking off

PN-5
Redesignated Felixstowe F5L

PN-6
Redesignated F-6L. Last two Naval Aircraft Factory F5Ls, modified with revised tail surfaces.

PN-7
Modified version with new wings with high-lift thick aerofoil section and wingspan reduced from 103 ft 9 in to 72 ft 10 in (from 32 m to 22 m). Powered by two 525 hp (391 kW) Wright T-2 engines. Two built.

PN-8

PN-7 with metal hull. Powered by two 475 hp (354 kW) Packard 1A-2500 V-12 engines. Two built.

PN-9
Converted from PN-8 with redesigned engine nacelles. One converted.

PN-10
Similar to PN-8. Powered by two 500 hp (370 kW) Packard 1A-2500. Two built.

PN-11
New hull eliminating sponsons, fitted with twin vertical tail surfaces. Four built, one with two Pratt & Whitney R-1690 Hornet engines, and remaining three powered by two Wright R-1750D Cyclone.

XP4N-1
Improved PN-11; three aircraft ordered, originally designated XP2N but redesignated XP4N-1 before delivery. Last two aircraft completed as XP4N-2s.

XP4N-2
Improved XP4N-1 with additional fuel capacity.

PN-12
Development of PN-10 powered by radial engines. Two built. One powered by two Pratt & Whitney Hornet engines, with the other powered by two Wright R-1750 Cyclone engines.

Douglas PD-1
Developed production version of PN-12. Two 575 hp (429 kW) Wright R-1750 Cyclone engines. 25 built by Douglas.

Keystone PK-1
Production version of PN-12. Twin tails. Two 575 hp (429 kW) Wright R-1820 Cyclone engines. 18 built by Keystone.

Martin PM-1
Production derivative of PN-12. Two 525 hp (391 kW) Wright R-1750 Cyclone engines. 27 built for US Navy by Martin.

Martin PM-1B
Export version of PM-1 for Brazil. Three built.

Martin PM-2
Improved derivative of PM-1 with more powerful Wright R-1820 Cyclone engines and twin tails. 25 built.

P1M
Brazilian Navy designation of the Martin PM.

== Operators ==
Brazil

- Brazilian Naval Aviation

United States

- United States Navy

== Specifications (PN-12) ==
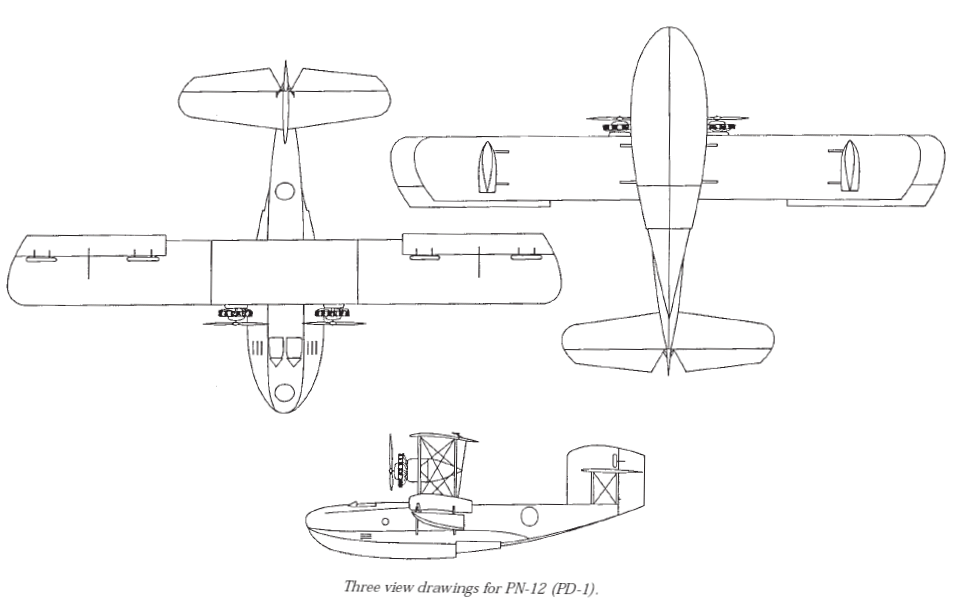
Naval Aircraft Factory PN-12.

Data from United States Navy Aircraft since 1911

General characteristics

- Crew: Five
- Length: 49 ft 2 in (14.99 m)
- Wingspan: 72 ft 10 in (22.21 m)
- Height: 16 ft 9 in (5.11 m)
- Wing area: 1,217 sq ft (113.1 m^{2})
- Airfoil: USA 27
- Empty weight: 7,699 lb (3,500 kg)
- Gross weight: 14,122 lb (6,419 kg)
- Powerplant: 2 × Wright R-1750 D Cyclone 9-cylinder single row radial engine, 525 hp (392 kW) each

Performance

- Maximum speed: 99 kn (114 mph, 184 km/h) at sea level
- Range: 1,139 nmi (1,310 mi, 2,109 km)
- Service ceiling: 10,900 ft (3,300 m)
- Wing loading: 11.6 lb/sq ft (56.8 kg/m^{2})
- Power/mass: 0.074 hp/lb (0.12 kW/kg)
- Climb to 5,000 ft (1,520 m): 16 min

Armament

- Single .30 in (7.62 mm) calibre machine guns in bow and amidships cockpits
- Four 230 lb (105 kg) bombs underwing

== See also ==
- Boeing XPB
- Earl Schuyler Kleinhans

Related development

- Consolidated P2Y/Martin P3M
- Felixstowe F5L
- Hall PH

Aircraft of comparable role, configuration, and era

- English Electric Kingston
- Hiro H1H
- Hiro H2H
- Saunders A.14
- Supermarine Scapa
- Supermarine Southampton

Related lists

- List of military aircraft of the United States
- List of flying boats and floatplanes
