= Bryant, Seattle =

- Seattle Neighborhood
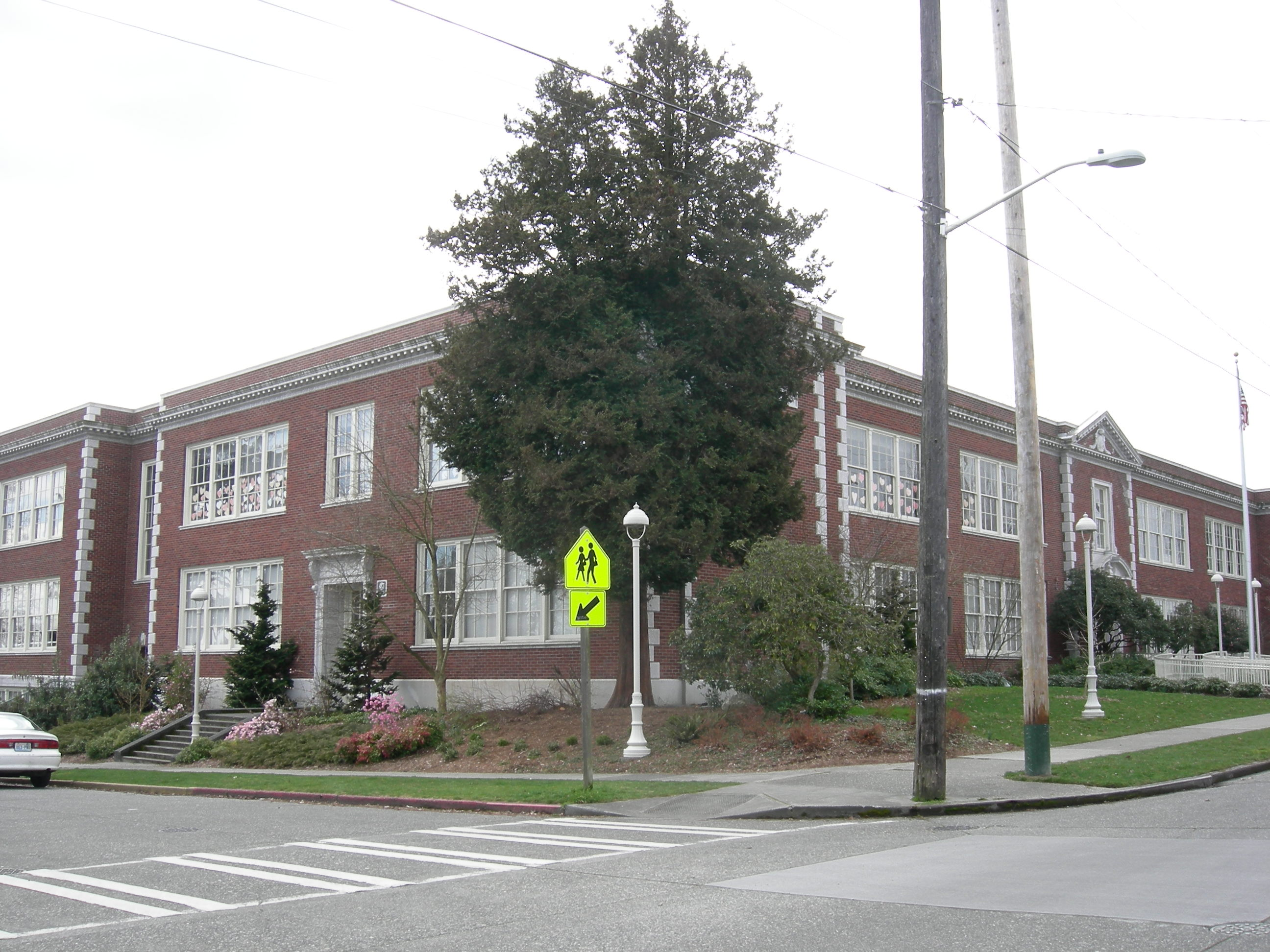
- Bryant School a Historic Landmark located in Bryant.

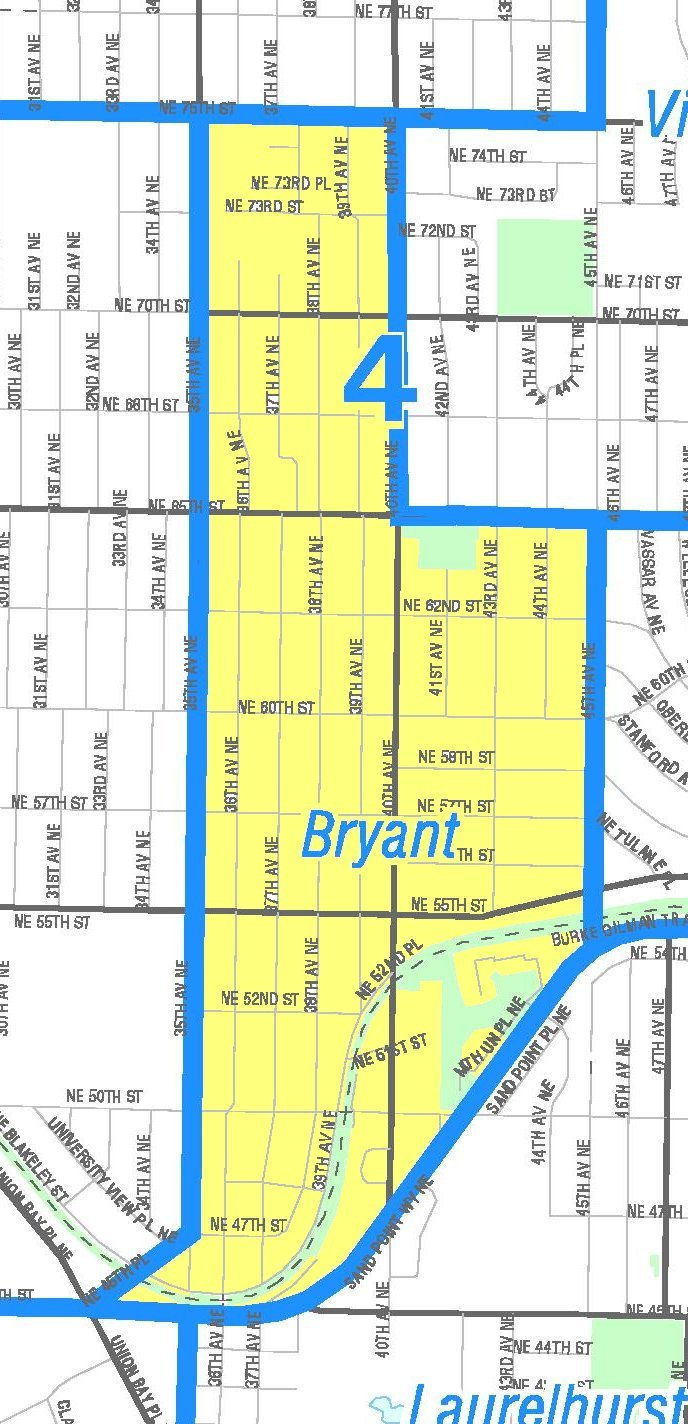
- Bryant Highlighted in Yellow
- Coordinates: 47°40′13″N 122°17′08″W
- Country: United States
- State: Washington
- County: King
- City: Seattle
- ZIP Code: 98115
- Area code: 206, 564

Bryant is a residential neighborhood in northeastern Seattle, Washington. According to the City of Seattle's neighborhood maps (as pictured), it is bounded by 35th Avenue NE and NE 45th Place on the west, beyond which is Ravenna; Sand Point Way NE and 45th Ave NE on the east, beyond which are Laurelhurst and Windermere; and NE 75th Street and NE 65th Street on the north, beyond which are View Ridge and Wedgwood.

The neighborhood is sometimes known as Ravenna-Bryant, due to its proximity to Ravenna Park. The Burke–Gilman Trail runs along the southern and eastern margins of the neighborhood, paralleling Blakeley Street, Union Bay Place, 45th Street, and Sand Point Way. Bryant Park is located on NE 65th Street at 40th Avenue NE. In late 2012 the Ravenna-Bryant association incorporated a small neighborhood bounded by 35th Avenue NE on the west, 40th Avenue NE on the east, NE 75th Street on the north, and NE 65th Street on the south. The area had previously been a 'donut hole' between the neighborhood belonging to the Ravenna-Bryant association and those of Wedgwood and View Ridge.

The North East branch of the Seattle Public Library, is located at 35th Avenue NE and NE 68th Street. Bryant is also the home to Assumption Catholic Church, University Unitarian Church, Ravenna Methodist, which houses a local preschool cooperative, and three synagogues, Congregation Beth Shalom (Conservative) at 35th Avenue NE and NE 68th Street, Emmanuel Congregation (Modern Orthodox) on NE 65th Street and 35th Avenue NE, and Congregation Shaarei Tefilah–Lubavitch (Orthodox) on NE 65th Street and 43rd Avenue NE.

Bryant Elementary School, the Nathan Eckstein Middle School, and the North East Library all have status as Seattle city landmarks, as does Fire Station #38 at 5503 33rd Avenue N.E.

== Education ==
Bryant Elementary School is located at 33rd Avenue NE and NE 60th Street. The school was named after William Cullen Bryant. Bryant School has an event called the Bryant Blast, now in the fall, that offers many games and food, including bouncy toys, cake walks, raffles, and more. On the 4th of July, an annual block party takes place along the two streets west of the elementary school. The neighborhood is also home to the Nathan Eckstein Middle School.

== Parks ==
Bryant Playground

Bryant Playground is a 3.1 acre (13,000 m^{2}) playground and park located at N.E. 65th Street and 40th Avenue N.E. This places it at the very northern end of the Hawthorne Hills/Bryant neighborhood or the very southern end of the View Ridge neighborhood. It was acquired by the city in 1976 from Brook Haven Baptist Church for $155,000. The park and playground were developed two years later at a cost of $415,000.

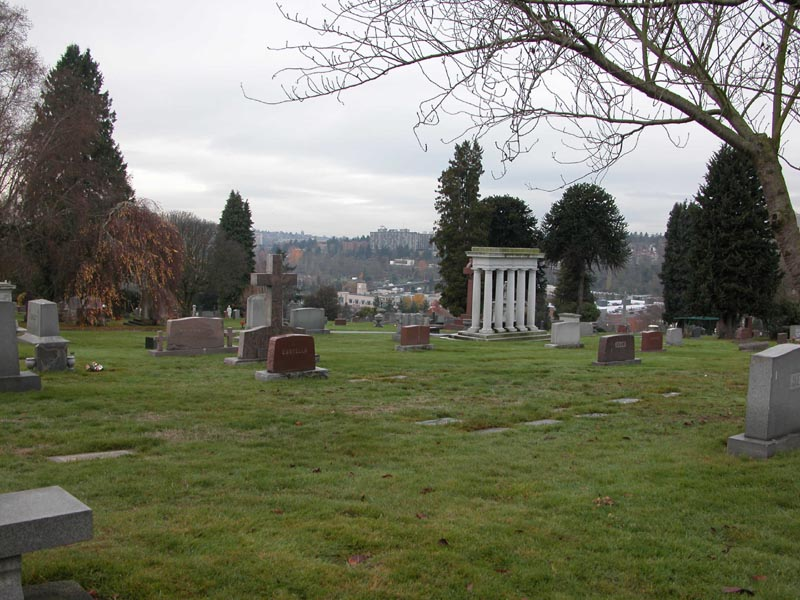
Calvary Cemetery in Ravenna/Bryant with University of Washington residence towers in background

== Commercial Establishments ==
There are commercial establishments along NE 55th Street between 25th and 35th Avenues NE. The west end was home to the original Kidd Valley burger restaurant, which closed in 2022. The Duchess Bar on 55th west of 30th Avenue NE is a popular place for patrons to watch University of Washington football games, which are played just south of the neighborhood at Husky Stadium. Across the street is Queen Mary's, a teahouse, and Pair, restaurant specializing in dishes that may be shared. A coffee shop, Ventoux, a Spanish restaurant, Guadi, an Italian café, MioPosto, and several shops, top the hill. The neighborhood is also home to two grocery stores: Puget Consumer Co-op (PCC), a local cooperative chain, at 40th Avenue NE and NE 65th St, and Metropolitan Market, a former Albertsons, on 40th Avenue NE at NE 55th Street, at the southwest corner of the subneighborhood of Hawthorne Hills.
