= National Archives at Seattle =

Regional branch of the National Archives and Records Administration

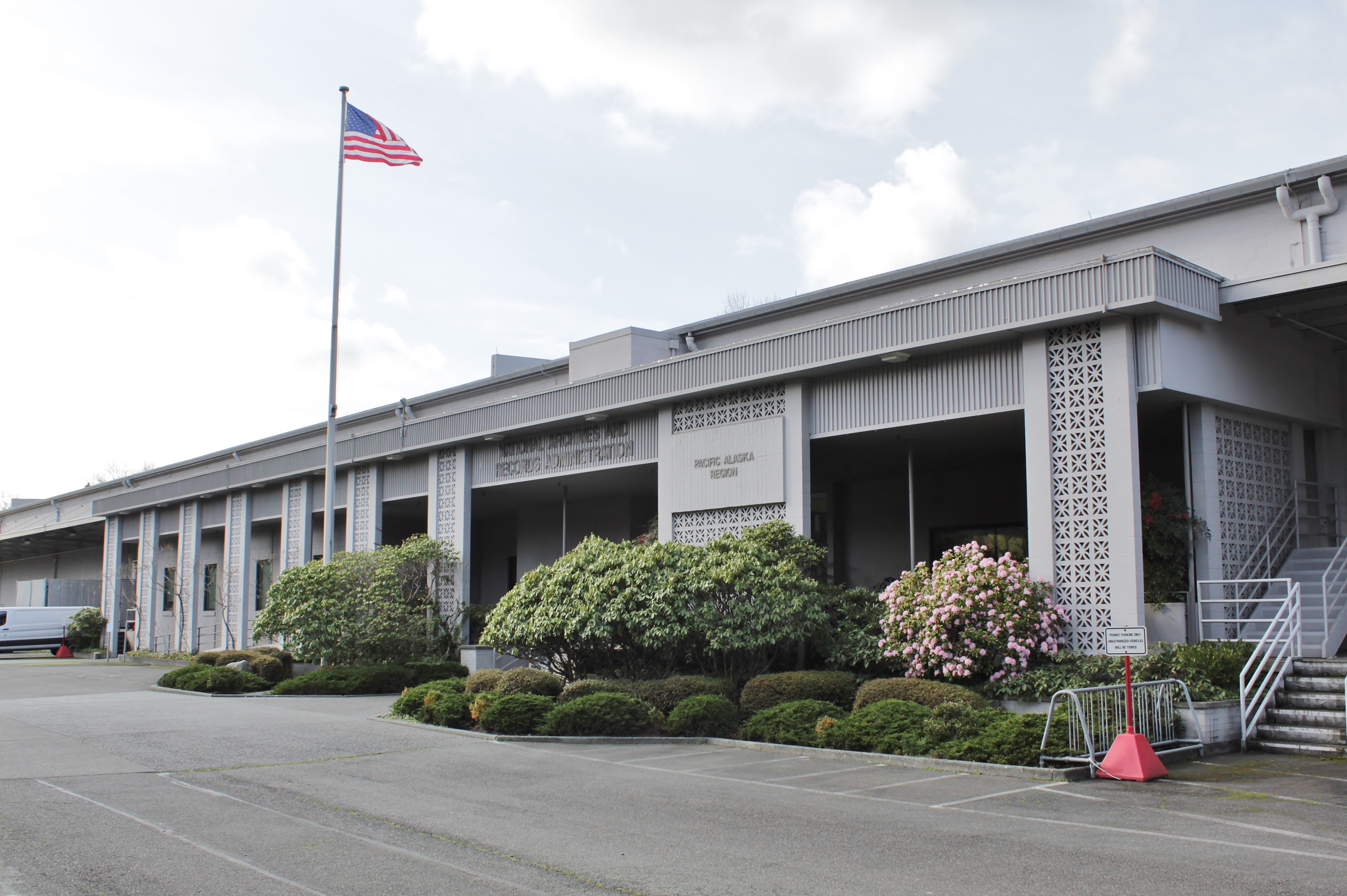
- Interactive map of National Archives at Seattle
- 47°40′24″N 122°16′03″W
- Location: 6125 Sand Point Way Northeast, Seattle, Washington, United States
- Type: National archives
- Affiliation: National Archives and Records Administration
- Collection size: 56,000 cu ft (1,600 m^{3})
- Period covered: 1840s–1980s
- Employees: 22 (2024)

Building information
- Construction date: 1946
- Website: https://www.archives.gov/seattle

The National Archives at Seattle is a regional facility of the U.S. National Archives and Records Administration Pacific Region located in Seattle, Washington. The archives building is situated in the Windermere neighborhood of Northeast Seattle, near Magnuson Park, and holds 56,000 cubic feet (1,600 m^{3}) of documents and artifacts.

The archives opened in 1951 and moved to a permanent facility in 1963 at a renovated Navy warehouse. In 2020, the federal government approved plans to close the Seattle branch and sell the property, sparking backlash from local historians and public officials. The archives remain open and are scheduled to move to a new purpose-built facility.

== Facility ==
The National Archives at Seattle are housed in a building on Sand Point Way in the Windermere neighborhood of northeastern Seattle, near Magnuson Park and the Burke-Gilman Trail. The building is described as "drab" and "warehouse-like", and is located on a 10-acre (4.0 ha) campus with parking and a perimeter fence. The facility has 202,150 square feet (18,780 m^{2}) of floor space and can hold up to 900,000 cubic feet (25,000 m^{3}) of documents and records on 14-foot (4.3 m) shelves. The public access research room has seven computers and several microfilm readers. The building utilizes climate controls that set internal temperatures at 65 °F (18 °C) and humidity at 40–45 percent. As of September 2024, the Seattle facility had 22 employees.

=== Holdings ===
As of 2020, the Seattle facility has 56,000 cubic feet (1,600 m^{3}) of permanent records, including documents and artifacts from the U.S. states of Alaska, Idaho, Oregon, and Washington. The records date from the 1850s to the 1980s and include treaty documents from the region's 272 federally recognized Native American tribes, as well as unrecognized groups. The collections are organized into 110 record groups based on the federal agency or system that authored them.

== History ==
The General Services Administration opened a records center at the Sand Point Naval Air Station in 1951, serving as Seattle's branch of the National Archives. The Seattle branch was upgraded to a federal records center in August 1953 and moved five times prior to the establishment of the permanent facility. The new facility near Sand Point was located in a 59,000-square-foot (5,500 m^{2}) Navy warehouse that was built in 1949 and underwent extensive renovations that cost $397,000. It was dedicated as the Federal Archives and Records Center on November 16, 1963, in a ceremony that included speeches from Governor Albert D. Rosellini and U.S. senators Henry M. Jackson and Warren G. Magnuson, who praised the facility as "one of the finest centers in the nation". By 1969, the Seattle Federal Records Center had grown to 170,000 cubic feet (4,800 m^{3}) of material and 18 full-time employees. A portion of the collections was destroyed in a fire in 1974.

The Seattle branch began receiving national microfilm records in 1970, beginning with the minutes of the Continental Congress. The arrival of U.S. Census records in 1974 caused public use of the facility to increase from 25 people per day to over 2,500 as interest in genealogy was spurred by the Bicentennial celebration. The Seattle facility remained the smallest in the National Archives and Records Service system, with a capacity of 280,000 cubic feet (7,900 m^{3}) in 1977. The facility's Montana records were transferred to the Denver Archives in 1976, and the Alaska records were moved to a new facility in Anchorage, Alaska, that opened on July 11, 1990. The National Archives and Records Administration announced its closure of the Anchorage facility in 2014 and the records were transferred back to Seattle.

== Proposed closure and replacement ==
The Public Buildings Reform Board (part of the Office of Management and Budget) recommended the closure of the Seattle facility in late 2019. The recommendation report, submitted in December 2019, identified the 10-acre (4.0 ha) campus as highly valuable for sale and redevelopment. The recommendation was not subject to public hearings or advance notice, with only a briefing for the office of U.S. representative Pramila Jayapal in October. The site was one of only fourteen Federal properties nationwide recommended for disposal by the PBRB; the other Washington state site recommended was the General Services Administration's Auburn Complex. The recommended archives closure was approved by the federal government in January 2020, with plans to relocate records to storage facilities in Riverside, California, and Kansas City, Missouri, over an 18-month period.

The planned closure and relocation of records drew criticism from historians, archivists, and public officials in the Pacific Northwest and Alaska. The U.S. senators from Washington, Oregon, Idaho, and Alaska signed a letter to the Office of Management and Budget opposing the closure. The editorial boards of The Seattle Times and the Anchorage Daily News also published articles condemning the proposal. An on-site protest was held by indigenous rights activists on February 11, 2020, while tribal leaders from the Pacific Northwest met with officials from the National Archives and Records Administration. Washington Attorney General Bob Ferguson announced plans to review the closure for possible litigation under the Administrative Procedure Act, which requires public disclosure of the rationale for certain federal actions, or Executive Order 13175, which requires consultation with tribal officials for relevant federal decisions.

The facility was temporarily closed to the public on March 23, 2020, due to the COVID-19 pandemic. The planned full closure was challenged by Ferguson in a set of Freedom of Information Act lawsuits filed against NARA, the Office of Management and Budget, and the General Services Administration. In January 2021, the state governments of Washington and Oregon, joined by 28 tribes, filed a lawsuit against the federal government to halt the facility's closure following a notice from NARA that it intended to accelerate the sale process. On February 12, a preliminary injunction to block the sale was granted by U.S. District Court Judge John Coughenour. The Office of Management and Budget withdrew their approval of the facility's closure on April 8, citing the Biden administration's policy on tribal consultation. NARA announced that they would find a solution for the long-term storage of the records, stating that their "longstanding concerns with the building conditions" were not resolved with the decision.

In October 2023, Archivist of the United States Colleen Joy Shogan revealed plans to replace the facility during an interview with KIRO Newsradio, saying the agency was "moving forward with plans to build a new facility in the Seattle area for the National Archives," with funding in "the Fiscal Year 2024 appropriations legislation once it’s passed.". The 2024 federal budget included $9 million allocated towards the planning and design of a new NARA facility in the Seattle area, which was described by Deputy Archivist of the United States Jay Bosanko as "a very large project...the largest and most visible project that we’re working with GSA on at this time." In June 2026, an internal email sent to National Archives staff, by agency Chief Operating Officer Jay Trainer, stated that the agency would be "begin moving records out" of the Seattle facility, with archival and permanent records remaining there until a "suitable replacement facility is identified," with a contract awarded for a new archival facility, within the city of Seattle, in summer 2026. The agency added that temporary records will be "shipped to other locations" and the process of moving to a new location may take "two to three years," with the General Services Administration estimating that a new facility "will be complete in spring 2032."
