= Sand Point, Seattle =

Neighborhood in Seattle, Washington, US

Coordinates: 47°40′57.5″N 122°15′16″W

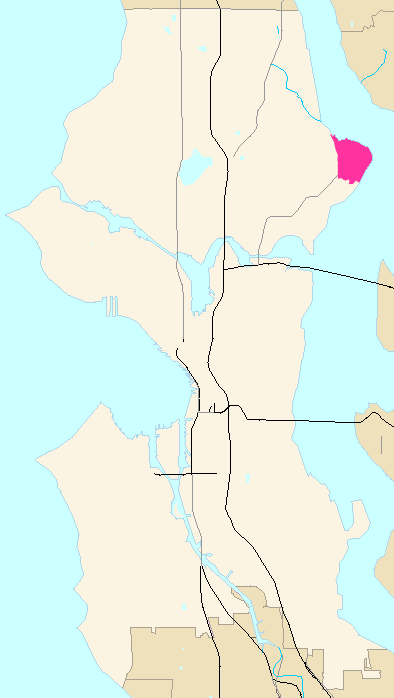
Sand Point

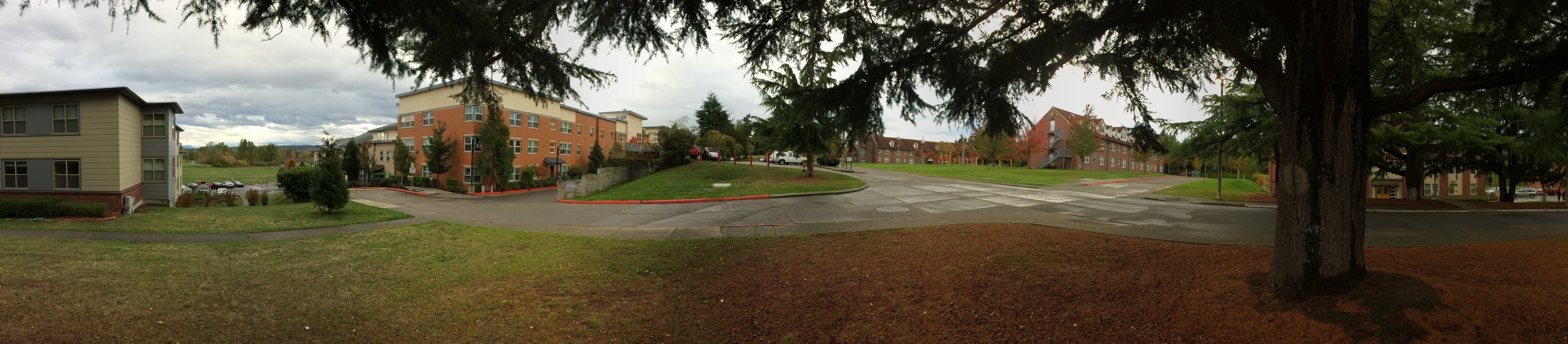
Apartments and other facilities in Sand Point, just at the edge of Magnuson Park

Sand Point is a neighborhood in Seattle, Washington, United States, named after and consisting mostly of the Sand Point peninsula that juts into Lake Washington, which is itself largely given over to Magnuson Park. Its southern boundary can be said to be N.E. 65th Street, beyond which are Windermere and Hawthorne Hills; its northern boundary, N.E. 95th Street, beyond which is Lake City. The western limit of the neighborhood, beyond which are View Ridge and Wedgwood, is not fixed and can be said to be anywhere up the hill that extends west from Sand Point Way N.E. as far as 35th Avenue N.E. It is also the former home of Seattle Naval Air Station.

== Sand Point Airfield ==
Sand Point Airfield was the endpoint of the first aerial circumnavigation of the world in 1924. The historic flight helped convince Congress to develop Sand Point as a naval air station. The station ceased operations in 1970.

== Climate ==
This region experiences warm (but not hot) and dry summers, with no average monthly temperatures above 71.6 °F. According to the Köppen Climate Classification system, Sand Point has a warm-summer Mediterranean climate, abbreviated "Csb" on climate maps.

Climate data for Sand Point, Seattle
Month	Jan	Feb	Mar	Apr	May	Jun	Jul	Aug	Sep	Oct	Nov	Dec	Year
Record high °F (°C)	64 (18)	66 (19)	78 (26)	83 (28)	90 (32)	96 (36)	105 (41)	98 (37)	94 (34)	87 (31)	76 (24)	62 (17)	105 (41)
Mean daily maximum °F (°C)	47.4 (8.6)	49.8 (9.9)	53.9 (12.2)	58.8 (14.9)	65.3 (18.5)	70.2 (21.2)	76.5 (24.7)	77.0 (25.0)	71.3 (21.8)	60.5 (15.8)	51.9 (11.1)	46.5 (8.1)	60.8 (16.0)
Mean daily minimum °F (°C)	37.2 (2.9)	37.0 (2.8)	39.2 (4.0)	42.8 (6.0)	48.3 (9.1)	52.7 (11.5)	56.5 (13.6)	57.1 (13.9)	53.2 (11.8)	46.7 (8.2)	40.9 (4.9)	37.0 (2.8)	45.7 (7.6)
Record low °F (°C)	−4 (−20)	−1 (−18)	7 (−14)	25 (−4)	33 (1)	38 (3)	43 (6)	47 (8)	34 (1)	28 (−2)	13 (−11)	10 (−12)	−4 (−20)
Average precipitation inches (mm)	5.14 (131)	3.54 (90)	3.86 (98)	2.98 (76)	2.16 (55)	1.57 (40)	0.78 (20)	1.00 (25)	1.74 (44)	3.65 (93)	5.85 (149)	5.55 (141)	37.82 (961)

== Notable residents ==
- Gordon Hirabayashi, a civil rights leader and 2012 recipient of the Presidential Medal of Freedom, who challenged the constitutionality of Japanese American internment camps during World War II. Hirabayashi was born on April 23, 1918. His parents were farmers in the Sand Point area along the shore of Lake Washington.
