= VP-32 =

Patrol Squadron 32
- Active: 6 September 1943 – 6 June 1949
- Country: United States of America
- Branch: United States Navy
- Type: squadron
- Role: Maritime patrol
- Engagements: World War II

Aircraft flown
- Patrol: PBY-5A/6A

VP-32 was a Patrol Squadron of the U.S. Navy. The squadron was established as Patrol Squadron 62 (VP-62) on 6 September 1943, redesignated Patrol Bombing Squadron 62 (VPB-62) on 1 October 1944, redesignated Patrol Squadron 62 (VP-62) on 15 May 1946, redesignated Amphibian Patrol Squadron 2 (VP-AM-2) on 15 November 1946, redesignated Patrol Squadron 32 (VP-32) on 1 September 1948 and disestablished on 6 June 1949. It was the second squadron to be designated VP-32, the first VP-32 was redesignated VP-52 on 1 July 1941.

== Operational history ==
- 6 September 1943: VP-62 was established at NAS Whidbey Island, Washington, under the operational control of FAW-6. Like the previous VP-62 disestablished in July 1943, the squadron was designated as an amphibious squadron flying the PBY-5A Catalina. The squadron remained at Whidbey Island through November and conducted training ashore.
- 25 November 1943: VP-62 departed NAS Whidbey Island for Dutch Harbor, Aleutian Islands, headquarters of FAW-4, arriving on 30 November. The squadron received its assignment and departed for NS Adak, Alaska, the next day.
- 10 December 1943: VP-62 was temporarily based ashore at Amchitka Air Force Base, Alaska, for familiarization flights.
- 31 January 1944: VP-62 flew to Attu, following the Army’s recapture of the island on 29 May 1943. The last island in the Aleutian chain, Attu was the jumping off point for bombing missions over the Kurile Islands. The squadron flew no bombing missions but conducted reconnaissance of the waters around Attu.
- 22 March 1944: Several VP-62 crews were sent to the LORAN (long-range navigation equipment) school at NS Adak. With up to 60 percent of all the flying in the Aleutians conducted in instrument flight rule (IFR) conditions, LORAN saved many aircrews that would otherwise have been unable to find their bases due to overcast down to ground level.
- 12 October 1944: VPB-62 was relieved by VPB-43 for return to NAS Seattle, Washington. All 12 aircraft and associated ground crew personnel returned to NAS Seattle. On 10 November 1944, all hands were given orders and home leave.
- 1 December 1944: VPB-62 was reformed at NAS Whidbey Island, under the operational control of FAW-6. Training was conducted for long range patrol and bombing.
- 1 January – June 1945: The squadron was relocated to NAS Oak Harbor, Washington, for continuation of training, which was completed by the end of June 1945.
- 1 July – August 1945: VPB-62 flew to NAS Whidbey Island in preparation for deploying to the Aleutians. Eleven of the crews departed on 15 July. One aircraft undergoing maintenance at NAS Whidbey Island was left behind; this plane’s crew departed on a Naval Air Transport Service flight to NS Adak on 25 August. The ground support staff departed Seattle aboard SS Henry Failing, arriving at NS Adak on 13 August. After reporting to FAW-4 headquarters at Kodiak, the squadron was deployed in four detachments: headquarters at Adak, Det 2 at Amchitka, Det 3 at Dutch Harbor, and Det 6 at Kodiak. The duties of the detachments were to conduct sector searches along the Aleutian chain.
- 4 September 1945: Detachment 2 at Amchitka was absorbed into the headquarters group on Adak.
- 27–28 September 1945: Detachment 3 at Dutch Harbor was withdrawn to Kodiak.
- September 1945: A PBY-5A piloted by VPB-62’s commanding officer Commander George R. Smith, which took off from Cold Bay, Alaska, carrying a full crew and nine passengers, crashed at the foot of Old Woman’s Mountain. Eight of the 15 people aboard were killed.
- January 1946: VPB-62 was stationed at NAS Whidbey Island with a complement of 14 PBY-6As.
- 15 May 1946: VPB-62 was redesignated VP-62, and the aircraft complement was reduced to nine PBY-6As. A detachment of four aircraft was deployed to NS Adak.
- 15 November 1946: VP-62 was redesignated VP-AM-2 and the squadron’s complement of aircraft was reduced again, from nine to six PBY-6As. A detachment of four aircraft was still deployed to NS Adak. The number of PBY squadrons in the Navy was being greatly reduced, with existing stocks of newer PBY-6A aircraft going to the Navy Reserve amphibious squadrons which were established on 1 May 1946. The active duty amphibious squadrons were being converted to the P2V Neptune and P4Y-2 Privateer.
- June 1947: The squadron had only three PBY-5As at NAS Whidbey Island, compared to the six they were authorized on the allowance list.
- September 1947: The three remaining squadron aircraft deployed to NS Adak. VP-AM-2 was still an operational squadron but was not assigned its full inventory of aircraft and personnel due to the postwar cutbacks.
- 15 January 1948: VP-AM-2 was en route to NAS Kaneohe Bay, Hawaii, with its three PBY-5As for a permanent change of station. By April 1948, the squadron was at Kaneohe with a full complement of six PBY-6As, apparently issued upon arrival from postwar stocks. By June, the squadron allowance had been increased to nine PBY-6As.
- 1 September 1948: VP-AM-2 was redesignated VP-32. By December 1948, the squadron was equipped with two PBN-5As and seven PBY-6As.
- February – April 1949: By January 1949, the Navy had decided to eliminate a number of the active duty squadrons flying the medium seaplanes. By February the squadron’s inventory of aircraft had been reduced to seven. By the end of April there was only one PBY-6A left on hand.
- 6 June 1949: VP-32 was disestablished at NAS Kaneohe Bay.

== Aircraft assignments ==
The squadron was assigned the following aircraft, effective on the dates shown:

- PBY-5A - September 1943
- PBY-6A - January 1946
- PBN-5A - September 1948

== Home port assignments ==
The squadron was assigned to these home ports, effective on the dates shown:

- NAS Whidbey Island, Washington - 6 September 1943
- NAS Seattle, Washington - 12 October 1944
- NAS Whidbey Island - 1 December 1944
- NAS Oak Harbor, Washington - 1 January 1945
- NAS Whidbey Island - 1 July 1945
- NAS Kaneohe Bay, Hawaii - 15 January 1948

== See also ==
- Maritime patrol aircraft
- List of inactive United States Navy aircraft squadrons
- List of United States Navy aircraft squadrons
- List of squadrons in the Dictionary of American Naval Aviation Squadrons
- History of the United States Navy
