= VPB-61 =

Patrol Bombing Squadron 61
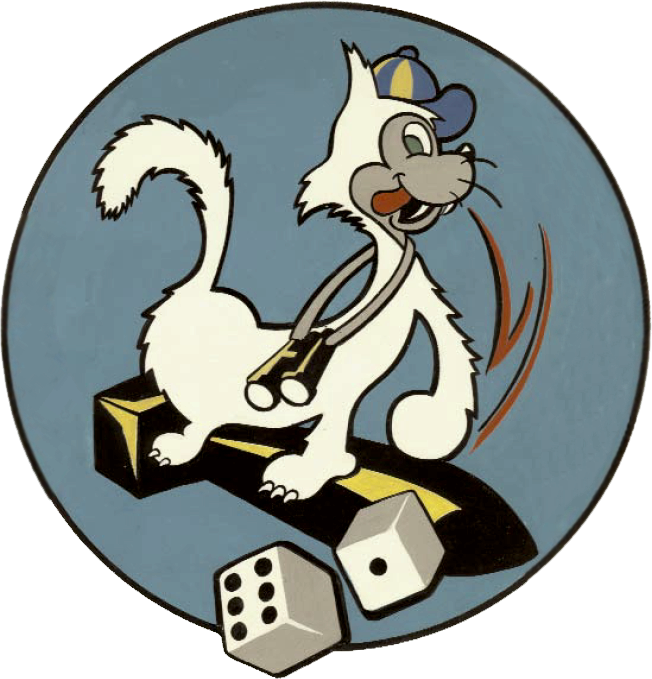
- Active: 1 May 1942 – 15 September 1945
- Country: United States of America
- Branch: United States Navy
- Type: squadron
- Role: Maritime patrol
- Engagements: World War II

Aircraft flown
- Patrol: PBY-5/5A

Patrol Bombing Squadron 61 (VPB-61) was a maritime patrol squadron of the United States Navy, in service from 1942 to 1945.

== History ==
The squadron was established as Patrol Squadron 61 (VP-61) on 1 May 1942, redesignated Patrol Bombing Squadron 61 (VPB-61) on 1 October 1944 and disestablished on 15 September 1945.

=== Operational history ===
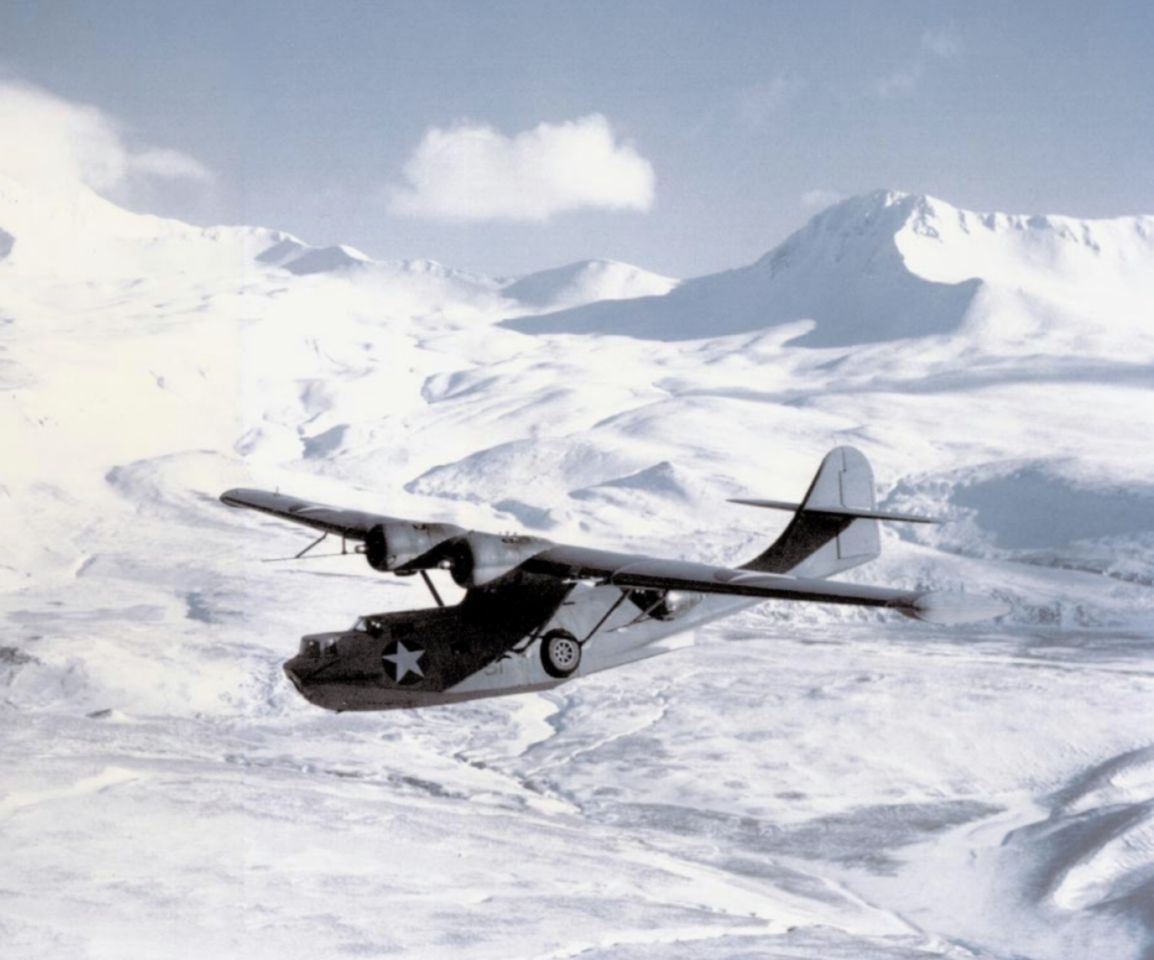
VP-61 PBY-5A over the Aleutians in 1943

- 1 May 1942: VP-61 was established at NAS Alameda, California, as a seaplane squadron flying both the PBY-5 Catalina and the amphibious PBY-5A version. During this period the squadron came under the operational control of PatWing-8. Training of squadron personnel continued through the end of July.
- 10 June 1942: Four of the squadron aircraft were ferried to NAAF Cold Bay, Alaska, for temporary duty.
- 15 August 1942: VP-61 departed NAS Alameda bound for Sitka, Alaska. Bad weather encountered en route kept the squadron grounded at NAS Seattle, Washington until 18 August. A break in the overcast allowed the squadron to make a quick dash to Sitka, then on the next day to NAS Kodiak, PatWing-4 headquarters where VP-61 reported for duty. The squadron was assigned duty at Section Base Sand Point, Popof Island. From this location three five-hour patrols were flown over search sectors each day.
- 23 August 1942: Four squadron aircraft were detached for duty at NAS Kodiak. All four returned to Sand Point, Popof Island, on 26 August 1942.
- 27–29 August 1942: Two aircraft were detached for operations from Nazan Bay, Atka Island, with tender support provided by USS Casco.
- 30 August 1942: Adak Island was occupied by Army forces and an advanced seaplane base was established there by the tender USS Teal, which put North Pacific forces within 250 miles (400 km) of Japanese-occupied Kiska and in a position to maintain a close watch over enemy shipping lanes to that island and to Attu. USS Casco was damaged by a torpedo from the Japanese Type L submarine RO-61 and was beached while repairs were completed.
- 2 September 1942: The squadron headquarters was relocated to NAF Dutch Harbor. Two aircraft were sent to operate with tender USS Casco at Nazan Bay, Atka Island; and three aircraft to operate with tender USS Teal at Kuluk Bay, Adak Island. From these sites the squadron conducted routine sector patrols and attacks on Japanese shipping.
- 30 November 1942: In preparation for relief and return to the States, all of the squadron aircraft flew back to NAF Dutch Harbor. Weather conditions were so bad at that base that none of the aircraft could be flown, even though they were kept on alert status through mid-December.
- 12 December 1942: A temporary break in the weather allowed the squadron to depart NAF Dutch Harbor, but it only got as far as Sitka, Alaska, when storms kept VP-61 grounded until 22 December 1942.
- 22 December 1942: VP-61 departed NAS Sitka for NAS Seattle, Washington. Upon arrival, crews were given home leave through 6 January 1943.
- 15 January 1943: After a week spent at NAS Seattle settling squadron affairs and administrative matters, the squadron again departed for the north, returning to NAS Sitka, Alaska, then on to NAS Kodiak on 18 January 1943. After reporting to FAW-4 headquarters, the squadron was assigned to NAF Otter Point, Umnak Island.
- 19 January 1943: VP-61 relieved VP-42 at NAF Otter Point. After getting settled, detachments of aircraft were sent to NAF Dutch Harbor.
- 4 May 1943: Squadron headquarters were reestablished at NAF Adak, Alaska, with a detachment at Amchitka Island.
- 10 May – 7 June 1943: Squadron headquarters were shifted to Amchitka Island in preparation for the invasion of Attu Island on 11 May. On 7 June 1943, the establishment of NAF Attu within one week of its capture from the Japanese brought FAW-4 bases to the tip of the Aleutian chain, nearly 1,000 miles (1,600 km) from the Alaskan mainland and 750 miles (1,210 km) from Japanese territory in the Kurile Islands.
- 7–16 October 1943: VP-61 was relieved by VB-61. Only half of the squadron was able to depart on the 8th when the weather shut down operations. The rest of the aircraft left the next day and rejoined the squadron at Kodiak. By 16 October 1943, all of the squadron aircraft arrived safely at NAS Seattle, completing the second tour of duty in the Aleutian Island chain. All hands were given 30 days home leave and told to report on expiration of leave to NAS Whidbey Island, Washington.
- 5 January 1944: VP-61 was reformed at NAS Whidbey Island under the operational control of FAW-6, spending the next three months training new crews and refurbishing equipment.
- 8 April 1944: The squadron departed NAS Whidbey Island for its third Aleutian tour, proceeding to Yakutat, Alaska, then on to NAS Kodiak on 12 April. After reporting to FAW-4 headquarters, the squadron was given orders to report to Adak Island to attend the LORAN School and the Ordnance refresher course. Operators could home in on LORAN beacons during IFR flying conditions and find their home bases safely. In the inclement weather of the far northwest, this equipment proved to be a lifesaver.
- 22 April 1944: VP-61 departed Adak for NAS Attu, commencing daily patrols the next day. The patrol areas were divided into six pie-shaped segments extending 350 miles (560 km) out to sea.
- 15 September 1944: VP-61 began flying inshore patrols along the shipping lanes, which extended the complete length of the Aleutian chain. To facilitate the coverage over these vast distances, the squadron was divided into detachments: Headquarters moved to NS Adak, Detachment 1 went to NAF Amchitka, Detachment 2 to NAS Kodiak, and Detachment 3 went to NAF Dutch Harbor.
- 10 December 1944: VPB-61 was relieved from inshore patrols by VPB-43. The various detachments rejoined the headquarters staff at NAS Kodiak.
- 11–28 December 1944: VPB-61 departed Kodiak en route to NAS Seattle. The last aircraft arrived on 28 December 1944, and all hands were given home leave.
- 1 February 1945: VPB-61 began reforming at NAS Whidbey Island with new personnel and equipment. With the end of the war imminent, deployment plans were delayed until the end of August, when the decision was made to disestablish the squadron.
- 15 September 1945: VPB-61 was disestablished at NAS Whidbey Island.

== Aircraft assignments ==
The squadron was assigned the following aircraft, effective on the dates shown:

- Consolidated PBY-5/5A Catalina - May 1942

== Home port assignments ==
The squadron was assigned to these home ports, effective on the dates shown:

- NAS Alameda, California - 1 May 1942
- NAS Seattle, Washington - 22 December 1942
- NAS Whidbey Island, Washington - 5 January 1944

== See also ==
- Maritime patrol aircraft
- List of inactive United States Navy aircraft squadrons
- List of United States Navy aircraft squadrons
- List of squadrons in the Dictionary of American Naval Aviation Squadrons
- History of the United States Navy
