= VPB-45 =

Patrol Bombing Squadron 45
- Active: 10 March 1943 - 5 June 1945
- Country: United States of America
- Branch: United States Navy
- Type: squadron
- Role: Maritime patrol
- Engagements: World War II

Aircraft flown
- Patrol: PBY-5/5A

VPB-45 was a Patrol Bombing Squadron of the U.S. Navy. The squadron was established as Patrol Squadron 45 (VP-45) on 10 March 1943, redesignated Patrol Bombing Squadron 45 (VPB-45) on 1 October 1944 and disestablished on 5 June 1945.

== Operational history ==
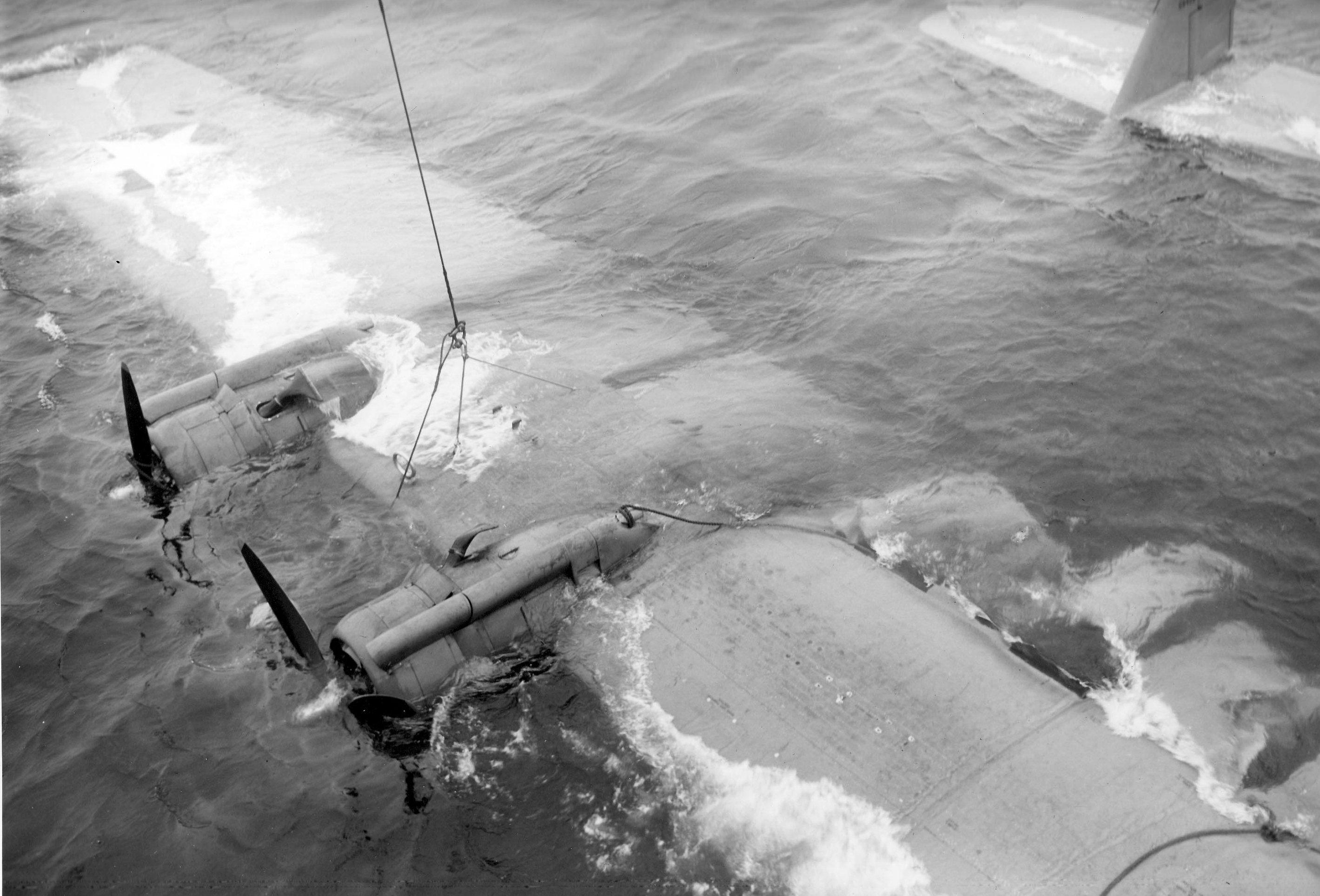
VP-45 PBY-5 being salvaged at Casco Cove, August 1943

- 10 March – April 1943: VP-45 was established at NAS Seattle, Washington, as a seaplane squadron flying the PBY-5 Catalina. The actual training of the squadron took place at NAS Whidbey Island, Washington, through mid-April 1943. During this period VP-45 came under the operational control of FAW-6.
- 22 April – June 1943: With training completed, six of the squadron's aircraft were relocated to Alaska, arriving at NAS Kodiak on 27 April and NAS Adak on 1 May 1943. The squadron officially deployed to Kodiak, Alaska, in May and came under the operational control of FAW-4. The squadron arrived just in time for the occupation of Attu, in the Aleutian Islands chain. Japanese forces had occupied this small island on 7 June 1942. On 28 May 1943, General Yamaziki of the Imperial Japanese Army received a surrender invitation via air drop by a VP-43 Catalina. He refused and the U.S. Army took Attu on 29 June. While the campaign for Attu was going on, tender USS Casco provided support for VP-45 operations which consisted of anti-shipping strikes in the vicinity of Attu, Amchitka and Kiska.
- 4 May 1943: The first regular patrols by VP-45 began from NAF Amchitka and beyond Attu towards the Kurile Islands.
- 30 June 1943: With the capture of Attu, larger facilities for coping with the requirements of a seaplane squadron became available. The remaining six aircraft of the squadron, which had been waiting at Seattle, deployed to augment the Casco group. Until shore facilities were built, the squadron continued open sea operations from the tender USS Casco at Attu.
- 10–19 July 1943: VP-45 made its first bombing run on Paramushir, Kurile Islands. The bombs were released by radar at night in overcast with unknown results. This performance was repeated on 19 July 1943. *10 August – 9 October 1943: VP-45 personnel were able to move ashore at Attu. Duties consisted primarily of sector searches for enemy activity, which by this time had been largely eliminated. Casco Cove at Attu was too small to provide adequate protection for the entire squadron and facilities for use of beaching gear for the non-amphibious PBY-5s was nonexistent. On 9 October 1943, the squadron was relieved by VP-43 for return to NAS Seattle, where the squadron could be refitted with new PBY-5A amphibious aircraft.
- 14 January 1944: VP-45 was reformed at NAS Seattle with amphibious PBY-5A aircraft and new personnel. Operational control was exercised by FAW-6. Training took place at NAS Whidbey Island, but instead of returning north upon completion of refitting and training, the squadron received orders in early March to proceed southeast to NAS Norfolk, Virginia.
- 15 March 1944: VP-45 departed NAS Whidbey Island for NAS Norfolk, where it came under the operational control of FAW-5. Shortly after arrival the squadron was relocated to NAS Boca Chica, Florida, where it was given training, as well as conducting operational Anti-submarine warfare (ASW) patrols.
- 29 April 1944: VP-45 deployed to NAF Belém, Brazil, with detachments maintained at NAF Amapá and NAF Sao Luiz, Brazil. Duties consisted of sweeps and ASW patrols. Operational control over the squadron was exercised by FAW-16.
- 7 June 1944: A detachment was sent to NAF Fernando de Neronha Island to conduct daily sector sweeps and antisubmarine patrols. Facilities at this tiny base located 210 miles (340 km) off the eastern coast of Brazil were cramped and primitive. VP-45 shared the base with PV-1 Ventura landplane detachments from VBs 125, 134 and 145 based out of NAF Pici Field, Fortaleza, Brazil.
- 1 October 1944: VP-45 was redesignated VPB-45. During this period the squadron conducted routine patrols and was additionally tasked with training Brazilian aircrews at NAF Galeão Field, Rio de Janeiro.
- January 1945: One aircraft was reported overdue from a patrol and presumed lost. Although weather may have been a factor, enemy action was more probable as German U-boats were increasingly heavily armed. In the previous year several Navy patrol aircraft had been shot down or damaged while attempting to complete a bombing run on surfaced submarines.
- February 1945: Six of the squadron's aircraft were detached to RAF Ascension Island for ASW patrols and convoy coverage.
- 15 March – 22 May 1945: VP-45 was relocated to Ipitanaga Field, Bahia, Brazil. Routine patrols were resumed until orders were received on 22 May 1945 for return to the continental United States.
- 27 May 1945: VP-45 reported aboard NAS Norfolk, under the operational control of FAW-5.
- 5 Jun 1945: VP-45 was disestablished at NAS Norfolk.

== Aircraft assignments ==
The squadron was assigned the following aircraft, effective on the dates shown:

- PBY-5 - March 1943
- PBY-5A - January 1944

== Home port assignments ==
The squadron was assigned to these home ports, effective on the dates shown:

- NAS Seattle, Washington - 10 March 1943
- NAS Norfolk, Virginia - 15 March 1944

== See also ==
- Maritime patrol aircraft
- List of inactive United States Navy aircraft squadrons
- List of United States Navy aircraft squadrons
- List of squadrons in the Dictionary of American Naval Aviation Squadrons
- History of the United States Navy
