= The Soundgarden =

The Soundgarden may refer to:

- Soundgarden, an American rock band
- A Sound Garden, a public art work in Seattle, Washington
