= VPB-43 =

Patrol Bombing Squadron 43
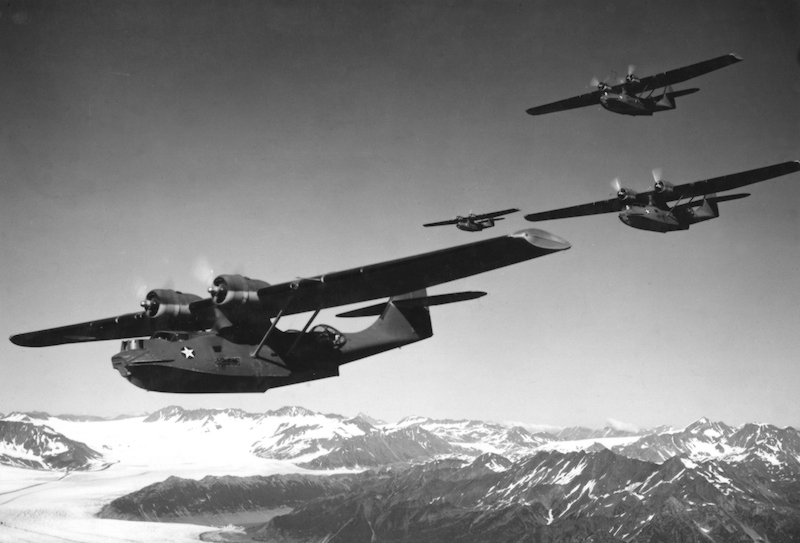
- VP-43 PBY-5s over the Aleutians in 1942
- Active: 21 July 1941 – 15 September 1945
- Country: United States of America
- Branch: United States Navy
- Type: squadron
- Role: Maritime patrol
- Engagements: World War II

Aircraft flown
- Patrol: PBY-5/5A

VPB-43 was a Patrol Bombing Squadron of the U.S. Navy. The squadron was established as Patrol Squadron 43 (VP-43) on 21 July 1941, redesignated Patrol Bombing Squadron 43 (VPB-43) on 1 October 1944 and disestablished on 15 September 1945.

== Operational history ==
- 21 July 1941: VP-43 was established at Naval Air Station San Diego, California, under the operational control of PatWing-1, as a seaplane squadron flying the PBY-5 Catalina. The squadron spent the next several months awaiting the delivery of new aircraft and training crews in the waters off southern California.
- 1 April 1942: A detachment of six aircraft departed San Diego, for duty with PatWing-4 and the 4th Bomber Command of the 4th Air Force at Naval Air Station Kodiak, Alaska. VP-43 joined VP-41, on duty in the area since the outbreak of hostilities, and VP-42, which had arrived in February 1942. This detachment returned to San Diego in late May 1942.
- 3 June 1942: An Imperial Japanese Navy strike force led by the carriers Ryūjō and Jun'yō attacked Dutch Harbor, decimating the defenses with repeated air attacks as a prelude to landings on Kiska and Attu on 7 June 1942. VP-41 was the only patrol squadron at NAF Dutch Harbor, having arrived there on 27 May 1942 (VP-42 had been sent to NAAF Cold Bay at the same time). To avoid the destruction of aircraft ashore, as had happened at Pearl Harbor, the squadrons dispersed to fjords where tenders provided the necessary servicing of aircraft. VP-41 lost two of its aircraft in combat while tracking the enemy fleet, with the crews captured and surviving the war in POW camps.
- 6 June 1942: Urgent requests for assistance led Admiral Nimitz to order VP-43 and a detachment of VP-51 to proceed to the Aleutian Islands immediately. By 4 June four Catalinas had been shot down and six were unserviceable, leaving 14 available. Departing in groups of three aircraft each, all 18 aircraft arrived safely on 10 June 1942 at Chernofsky Harbor, a small port on the northern side of Unalaska, coming under the operational control of PatWing-4.
- 10–14 June 1942: Lieutenant (jg) Milton Dahl of VP-43 was selected to conduct the first reconnaissance of the Japanese forces occupying Kiska and Attu. He verified the presence of the enemy and obtained an accurate count of vessels in both harbors. On 11 June 1942, Commander Patrol Wing 4 received a message from Commander in Chief Pacific which said, "bomb the enemy out of Kiska." Following unsuccessful missions by USAAF B-17s and B-24s, aircraft available from VPs 41, 42, 43 and 51 commenced continuous bombing missions against targets in Kiska harbor from 11 to 13 June. These missions became known as the "Kiska Blitz." During these bombing strikes the aircraft were serviced by USS Gillis at Nazan Bay, Atka Island. Efforts to use the PBYs as horizontal bombers dropping their bombs from above the clouds proved futile. Pilots began attacking singly, approaching from a direction that provided the best cloud cover. When they were over the harbor the Catalinas were put into a dive and bombs released at the appropriate time. The anti-aircraft (AA) fire was intense. A pullout was initiated at between 500-foot (150 m) and 1,500-foot (460 m), and the plane immediately again sought cover in the clouds. Two VP-43 aircraft were badly damaged during the raids and several crewmen killed. All of the crews were frustrated by the lack of adequate forward firepower (one 30-caliber machine gun) available for strafing. Lieutenant Commander Carroll B. Jones, commanding officer of VP-43, led his squadron on all the bombing and strafing attacks on shipping in Kiska Harbor. His aircraft was one of those damaged by the heavy AA fire during the attacks. For his courageous leadership and coolness under fire Lieutenant Commander Jones was subsequently awarded the Navy Cross. Ensign William T. Sorensen was also awarded the Navy Cross for his actions in the Kiska Harbor campaign. He flew his plane in repeated attacks on enemy ships in the harbor under extremely hazardous weather conditions and in the face of heavy antiaircraft fire from enemy ships and shore installations. On one of his dive bombing attacks he strafed enemy four-engine patrol planes on the water, destroying three of them. His aircraft returned from this attack riddled with over 100 bullet holes.
- 11 June 1942: Machinist Leland L. Davis, an enlisted pilot of a VP-43 Catalina, had made repeated bombing attacks on enemy ships in Kiska Harbor in the face of heavy AA fire from ships and shore batteries prior to 11 June. On 11 June, prior to his planned attack on Kiska Harbor, he spotted and reported sinking a Japanese submarine caught on the surface. Postwar examination of enemy records did not indicate any submarine losses on this date. However, for all his actions in the campaign against Kiska Harbor he was posthumously awarded the Navy Cross. Naval Aviation Pilot Davis and his crew failed to return from their final attack against Kiska Harbor on 14 June.
- 14 June 1942: Machinist Davis, while conducting a raid on Kiska, was shot down with the loss of all hands. During attacks on enemy ships in Kiska Harbor, Japanese reconnaissance aircraft spotted the tenders at Nazan Bay. Since both USS Casco and USS Gillis had largely expended their stocks of ammunition, bombs and aviation fuel, the decision was made to withdraw them. VP-41 and 42 were flown to Dutch Harbor and Cold Harbor, respectively, to prepare for return to the U.S. VP-43 flew to Kodiak for refit in preparation for further operations.
- July 1942: VP-43 returned to Nazan Bay, Atka Island, and continued bombing missions against Kiska and Attu whenever weather permitted. USS Gillis and USS Hulbert provided tender support.
- 20 July 1942: Lieutenant Green crashed into the side of a mountain on Atka Island with the loss of all hands.
- 23 August 1942: Lieutenant Raithel and crew were missing and presumed lost on a flight from Cold Bay.
- 30 August 1942: A task force commanded by Rear Admiral Robert A. Theobald occupied Adak Island. USS Casco was struck by a torpedo and beached at Nazan Bay. She was refloated and back in service on 12 September 1942.
- 20 September 1942: VP-43 was relieved for return to the U.S., arriving at Naval Air Station Alameda, California, on the 22nd, with all hands given home leave. The squadron returned to Dutch Harbor on 17 October 1942. *January 1943: VP-43 was relocated to Adak, Alaska, to provide reconnaissance on Japanese forces at Kiska and Attu during the landings on Amchitka. On 12 January 1943, a task force led by Rear Admiral Thomas C. Kinkaid occupied Amchitka Island.
- 1 February 1943: The squadron returned to Dutch Harbor.
- 1 June 1943: VP-43 was relieved for return to Naval Air Station Seattle, Washington, leaving a two aircraft detachment at NAF Dutch Harbor, based aboard USS Casco. Personnel were given home leave and orders for reforming at Naval Air Station Tongue Point, Oregon.
- 1 July 1943: VP-43 was reformed with many new personnel and new equipment at NAS Tongue Point, under the operational control of FAW-6. The squadron's PBY-5 aircraft had been replaced by Land Cats, the amphibious PBY-5A. Training of personnel continued at Tongue Point and Naval Air Station Whidbey Island, Washington, through the end of September.
- 15–16 August 1943: Kiska was occupied without opposition by U.S. forces. The Japanese had already abandoned the island a few days previously, taking advantage of bad weather to withdraw their troops without being observed by reconnaissance aircraft of VP-41, VP-42 or the two VP-43 detachment Catalinas.
- 31 August 1943: Japanese Type L submarine RO-61, Lieutenant Commander Toshisada Tokutomi commanding, entered the waters of Dutch Harbor on 30 August intent on sinking USS Casco, anchored in the bay guarded by USS Reid. At mid-day on 31 August USS Reid was detached to transport a group of engineers to Adak Island leaving Casco unprotected. Lieutenant Commander Tokutomi made his attack on Casco, damaging the tender and forcing it to beach to avoid sinking. Lieutenant S. Coleman of VP-42 spotted RO-61 through the fog in the lee of Atka volcano. He attacked with machine guns and two depth charges, heavily damaging the submarine. Lieutenant Carl Amme of the VP-43 detachment next spotted the submarine and made a Depth charge attack. RO-61 was further damaged by the attack, but managed to submerge leaving a large oil slick. Lieutenant Amme directed Reid to the site and marked the slick with smoke floats. Reid then dropped a pattern of depth charges that brought the submarine to the surface where it was sunk by gunfire. Five enlisted Japanese survivors were captured by Reid. Lieutenant Amme later found that RO-61 had put one of its torpedoes directly through the space where his bunk was located aboard Casco.
- 4 October – 12 November 1943: VP-43 departed Naval Air Station Tongue Point for Alaska. The weather during the flight north was so terrible that two of the squadron's new PBY-5As crashed en route. One was damaged during an attempted takeoff after a water landing with no injuries to personnel. The second aircraft struck a mountain near Pysht, Washington, leaving only two survivors. The remaining aircraft arrived safely at Naval Air Station Kodiak, Alaska, coming under the operational control of FAW-4. By 11 October 1943, the squadron had arrived for duty at Attu, which had been occupied by U.S. forces on 11 May 1943. Upon arrival, VP-43 relieved VPs 45 and 61. Only two days after arrival, the squadron was forced to move due to air attacks by Japanese aircraft. Shemya Island (occupied on 30 May 1943) remained the temporary base for VP-43 until 12 November 1943, when it was judged safe to return to Attu.
- 20 December 1943: VP-43 remained based at Attu. On this date night bombing and reconnaissance missions were extended to the Northern Kurile Islands, the northernmost islands of the Japanese homelands. These were the first Navy photo reconnaissance and bombing missions over the Kuriles. On 5 February 1944, VB-139 took over these duties, as they were equipped with the faster PV-1 Ventura bomber.
- 23 April 1944: VP-43 was relieved by VP-61 for return to Naval Air Station Seattle. All hands were given home leave and orders for new squadrons on 18 May 1944.
- 6 June 1944: VP-43 was reformed at Naval Air Station Whidbey Island, under the operational control of FAW-6. Training of personnel and refit with new equipment and aircraft continued through the end of September.
- 6 October 1944: VPB-43 departed Naval Air Station Whidbey Island, for Naval Air Station Attu, Alaska, under the operational control of FAW-4, relieving VPB-61. The squadron was split into several detachments with the headquarters staff at Adak; Detachment 2, Amchitka; Detachment 3, Dutch Harbor; and Detachment 6, Kodiak. Routine duties involved escorting shipping in the North Pacific and convoy coverage in the Alaskan Sea Frontier.
- 21 July 1945: VPB-43 was relieved by VPB-62, returning to Naval Air Station Seattle. The last aircraft had arrived by 18 August 1945, and orders were received to disestablish the squadron.
- 15 September 1945: VPB-43 was disestablished at NAS Seattle.

== Aircraft assignments ==
The squadron was assigned the following aircraft, effective on the dates shown:

- PBY-5 - July 1941
- PBY-5A - July 1943

== Home port assignments ==
The squadron was assigned to these home ports, effective on the dates shown:

- Naval Air Station San Diego, California - 21 July 1941
- Naval Air Station Alameda, California - 22 September 1942
- Naval Air Station Tongue Point, Oregon - 1 July 1943
- Naval Air Station Seattle, Washington - 23 April 1944
- Naval Air Station Whidbey Island, Washington - 6 June 1944
- Naval Air Station Seattle - 18 July 1945

== See also ==
- Maritime patrol aircraft
- List of inactive United States Navy aircraft squadrons
- List of United States Navy aircraft squadrons
- List of squadrons in the Dictionary of American Naval Aviation Squadrons
- History of the United States Navy
