= Villa Academy =

Primary school in Seattle, Washington

Coordinates: 47°39′50″N 122°16′24″W

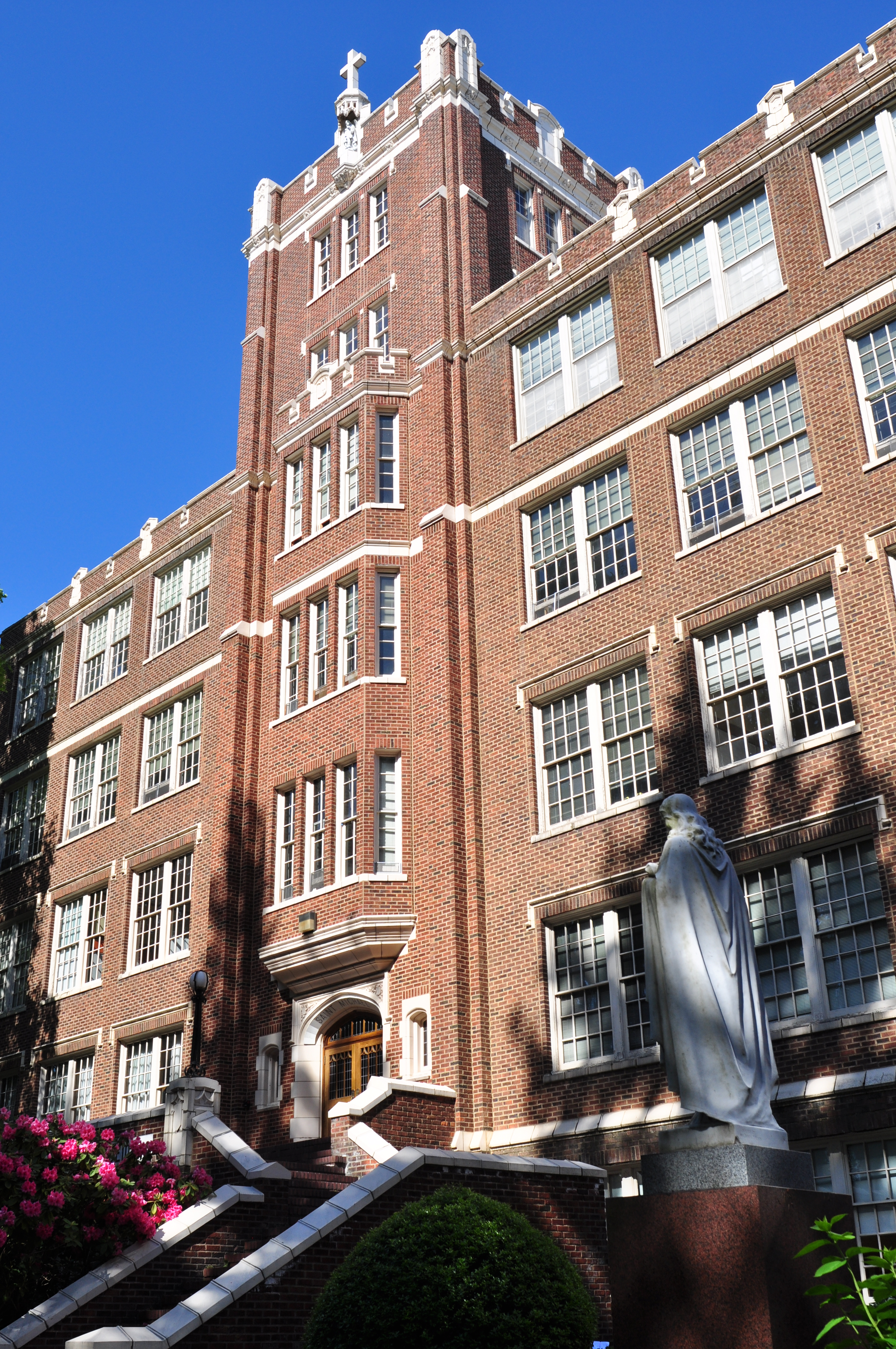
Villa Academy

Villa Academy is a Catholic independent PreK-8th grade school located in the Laurelhurst neighborhood of Seattle, Washington on a tract of land near Lake Washington. The school has a preschool, Lower School and Middle School and was founded by America's first Catholic saint, Mother Cabrini who was canonized as St. Frances Xavier Cabrini in 1946.

The campus includes orchards, gardens, three age appropriate playgrounds, and an athletic field. The building also has a dedicated art studio and music space, science laboratories, a performance theater, a full-size gymnasium, Lower School Computer lab, and historic chapel. In 2007-2008, Villa enrolled approximately 400 students, approximately half of whom are Catholic.

== History ==
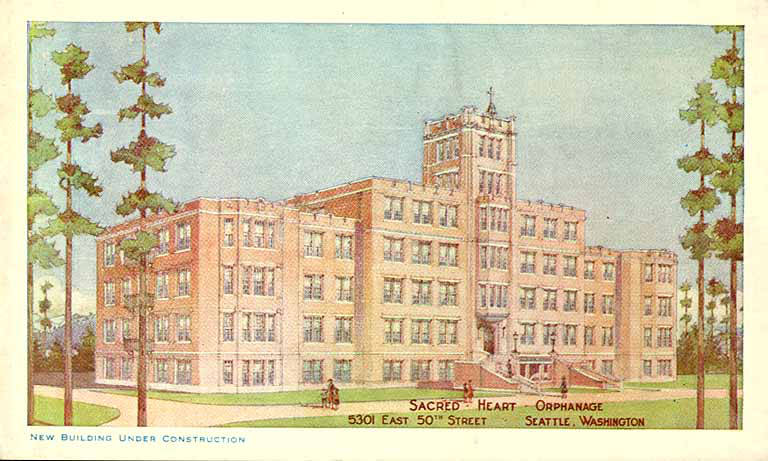
Main building in 1924 as an orphanage.

Villa Academy traces its roots to 1903 when the Missionary Sisters of the Sacred Heart of Jesus founded their first orphanage and school in Seattle on Beacon Hill. In 1914, Mother Cabrini (now St. Frances Xavier Cabrini) moved her mission to the Laurelhurst campus in Seattle, its current location. Villa’s two main buildings were designed by famed Seattle architect, John Graham Sr. in 1924 and a gymnasium was added in the late 1969.

The school originally included an orphanage run by the Missionary Sisters of the Sacred Heart until 1950. In 1951, the orphanage closed and the Sisters focused their efforts on an elementary school known as Sacred Heart Villa. In 1977, it became an independent private school and Seattle’s only Catholic independent preschool through eighth-grade school.

Villa Academy’s Chapel was constructed in the mid-1920s and underwent extensive restoration in 1991. Today, the chapel is rented for weddings and used by students.

== Student life ==
Villa Academy emphasizes academics and community service with small class sizes and an involved parent community. The goal of its “whole child” philosophy is to help young people realize their full academic, social, and emotional potential.

The preschool has a separate playground and learning spaces but preschoolers often visit the Lower School, gym, theater, and library. Each preschool class is paired with a lower or middle school class for the school’s buddy program.

The emphasis of the Lower School, or grades Kindergarten through fifth grade, is on building a strong foundation in reading, writing and math skills, as well as discovering the arts, sciences, and international language. Core curricular subjects include mathematics, reading, writing, religion, social studies, and science. In addition, students attend classes taught by specialists in art, music, physical education, technology, library, and French.

The Middle School comprises grades six through eight. Core curricular classes in the humanities (literature, language arts, social studies, religion), mathematics, science, and international languages (Spanish or French) are complemented by art, music, drama, and physical education. To support the learning process, students work with their laptop computers. Their family can either buy a laptop for Villa Academy or they can buy one from their local Apple store. Middle school students head the student council and transition into the high school model of different teachers for different subjects.

Before and after school care is available for students in Kindergarten through Eighth Grade. Special interest clubs include chess, math, writing, and others such as knitting. Performing arts include band, string ensemble, drama, and choir.

The school also offers summer programs called Villa Ventures for children ages four to 12. There are more than 50 full- and half-day programs n visual and performing arts, sports, science and technology, academic enrichment and special interest topics such as chess and cooking.

== Athletics ==
Villa Academy participates in the Archdiocese of Seattle, Catholic Youth Organization (CYO) athletic program. Interscholastic sports include cross-country, basketball, volleyball, soccer, and track and field for both boys and girls.
