= A Sound Garden =

Steel sculpture in Seattle, Washington, U.S.

- Artist: Douglas Hollis
- Year: 1982–1983
- Type: Sound sculpture
- Medium: Steel
- Dimensions: 6.4 m (21 ft)
- Location: Seattle, Washington, U.S.; 47.685444°N 122.249972°W
- Owner: National Oceanic and Atmospheric Administration

A Sound Garden is an outdoor public art work in Seattle, Washington, United States. It is one of six such works on the National Oceanic and Atmospheric Administration (NOAA) campus, which lies adjacent to Warren G. Magnuson Park on the northwestern shore of Lake Washington. Designed and built by sculptor Douglas Hollis from 1982 to 1983, the sound sculpture is composed of twelve 21-foot (6.4 m) high steel tower structures, at the top of each of which hangs an organ pipe attached to a weather vane that produces soft-toned sounds when stirred by the wind.

The sculpture attracted many visitors owing to its location overlooking Lake Washington, its visual and kinetic qualities, and its being the namesake of the Seattle rock band Soundgarden. It became a makeshift memorial to Soundgarden frontman Chris Cornell following his death in 2017. While the installation was open to the public along with the other artworks on NOAA's campus, access to the area has been restricted. As of April 9, 2023, the NOAA Western Regional Center campus and all trails and art installations on it are closed to the public.
