= View Ridge, Seattle =

- Seattle Neighborhood
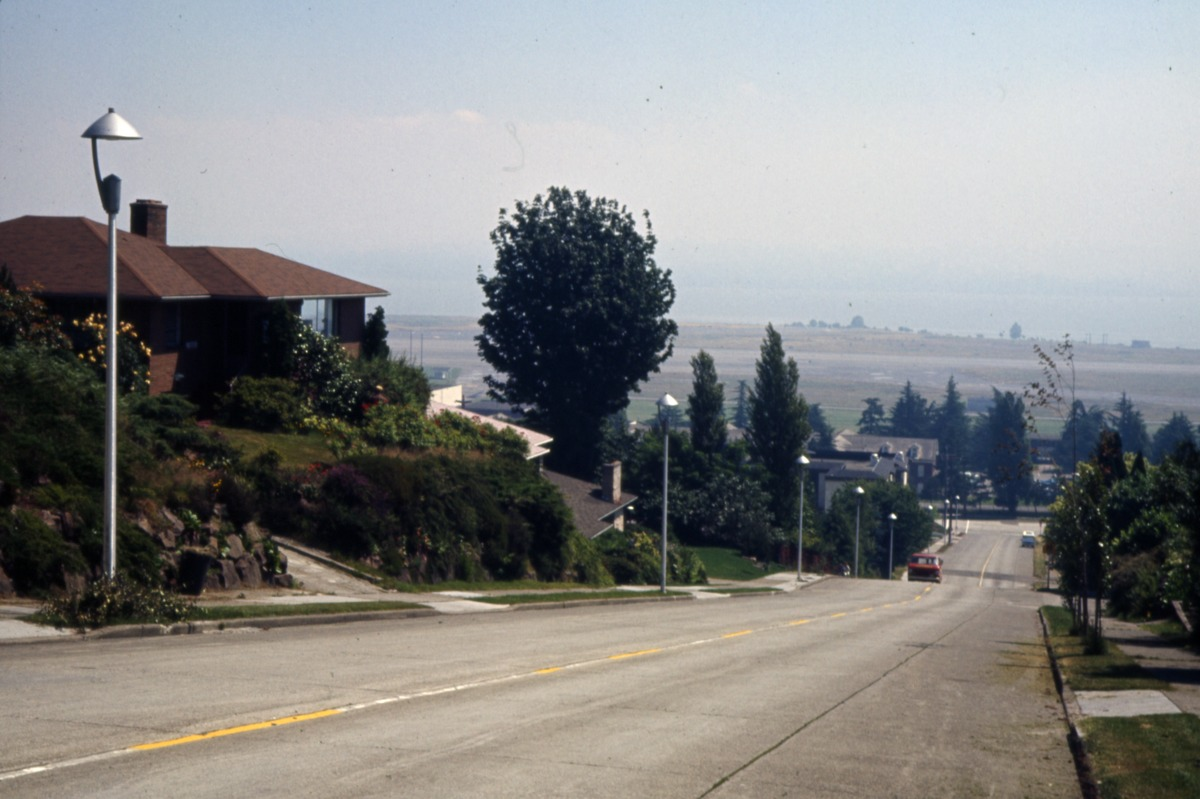
- View Ridge in 1966

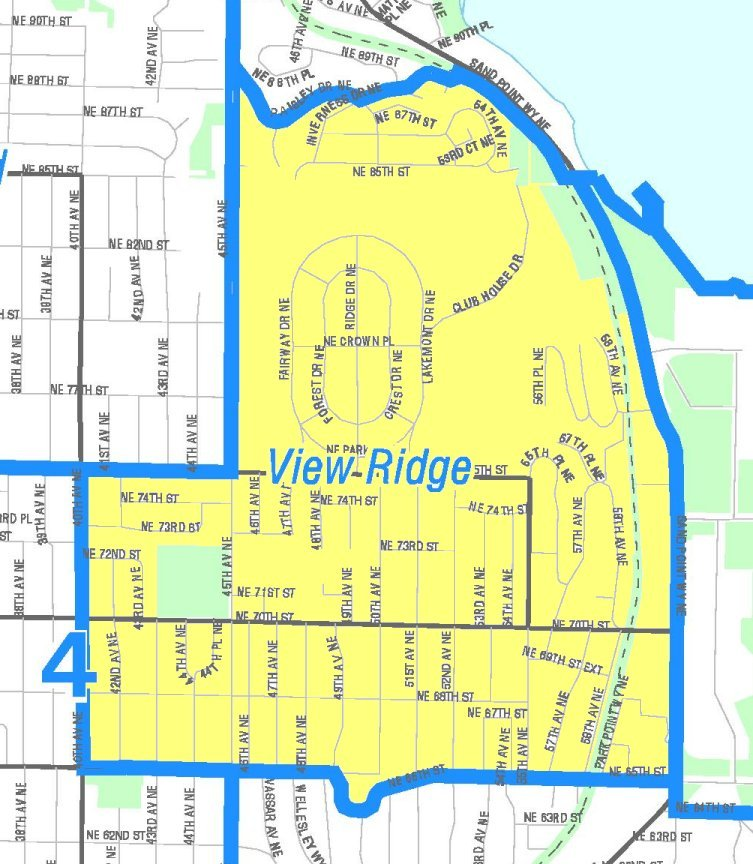
- View Ridge Highlighted in Yellow
- Coordinates: 47°40′46″N 122°16′26″W
- Country: United States
- State: Washington
- County: King
- City: Seattle
- ZIP Code: 98115
- Area code: 206, 564

View Ridge is a neighborhood in north Seattle, Washington. As with all Seattle neighborhoods, its boundaries are not fixed, but can be thought of as NE 65th Street in the south, 40th and 45th Avenues NE in the west, the Sand Point Country Club in the north, and Sand Point Way NE in the east. Many homes offer views of Lake Washington, Mount Rainier, and the Cascade Range. View Ridge Elementary School is located within the neighborhood, and the neighborhood also offers a large park and playfield (View Ridge Park) across the street from the elementary school. The View Ridge Swim and Tennis Club is located on the eastern edge of View Ridge, and the Sand Point Country Club is located on the northern edge.

== Demographics ==
View Ridge is home to a considerable Jewish community, with a Hasidic synagogue, Congregation Shaarei Tefillah Lubavitch, located at the corner of NE 65th St. and 43rd Ave. NE. There are several churches, too: Lutheran, Methodist, Presbyterian, and Catholic. In addition to the public elementary and middle school, there are many private schools nearby.

== Geography ==
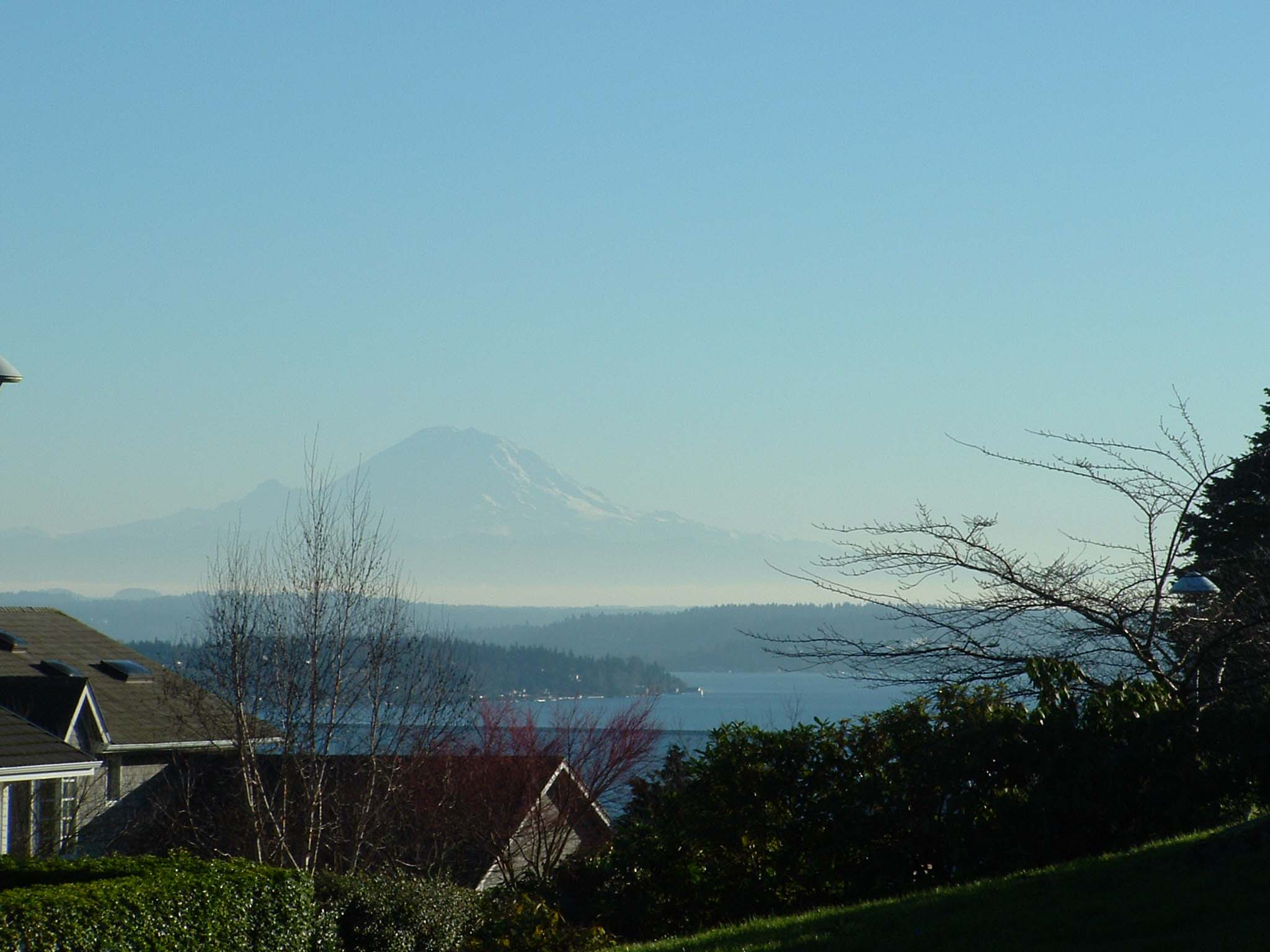
The view of Mount Rainier and Lake Washington from NE 68th St and 52nd Ave NE

View Ridge is roughly bounded by NE 65th Street in the south, beyond which is Hawthorne Hills; 40th and 45th Avenues NE in the west, beyond which is Wedgwood; the Sand Point Country Club in the north, beyond which is Matthews Beach; and Sand Point Way NE in the east, beyond which is Sand Point. View Ridge is located on a hill overlooking Magnuson Park as well as the former Naval Air Station Seattle. The neighborhood encompasses an area of approximately 1 square mile (2.6 km^{2}). The neighborhood is a high point between the adjacent neighborhoods of Wedgwood and Hawthorne Hills.

== History ==
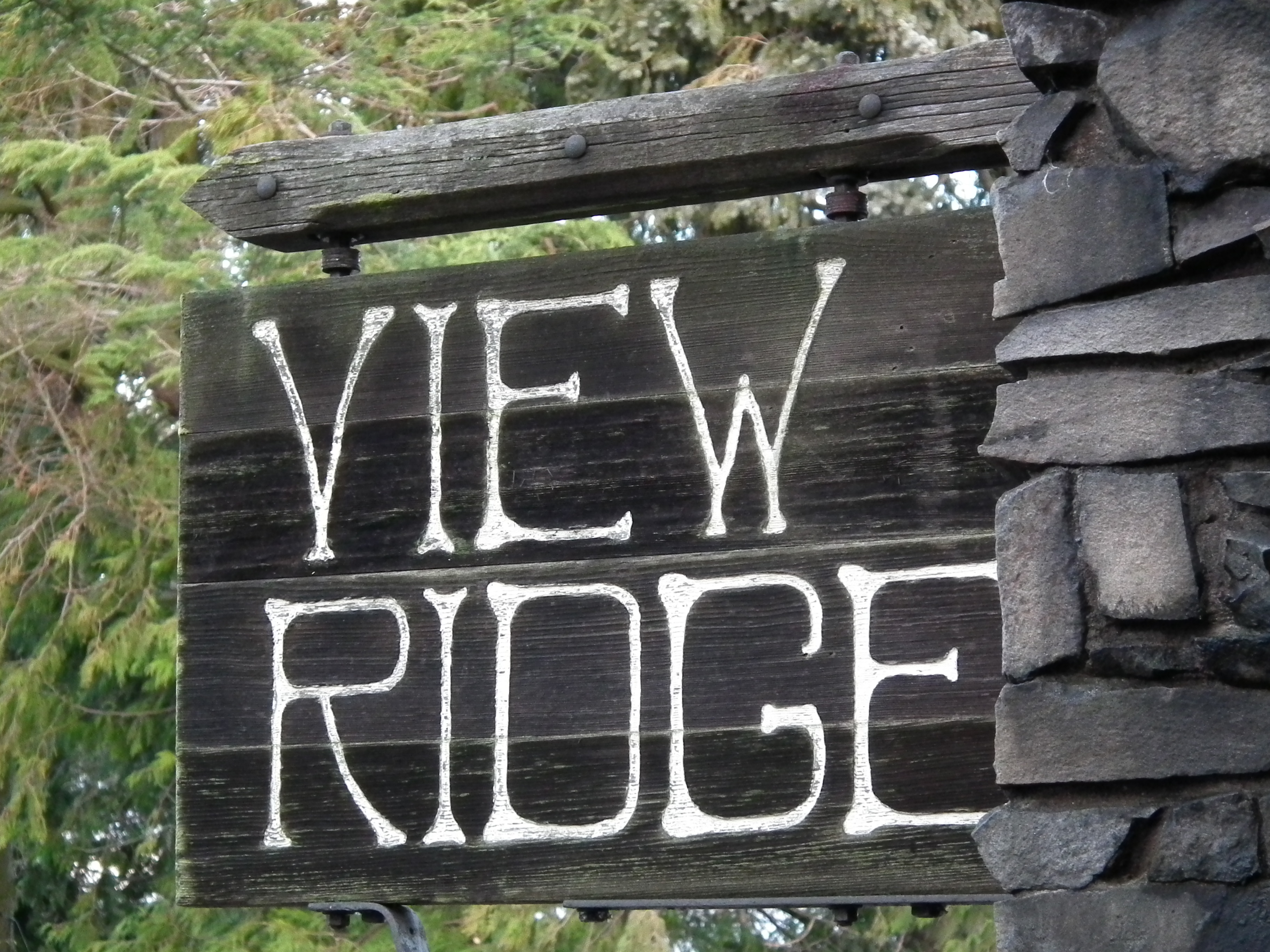

View Ridge was first settled in 1936 by Ralph Jones and Al Balch; it is one of the newest neighborhoods in Seattle. Upon buying 10 acres (40,000 m^{2}) of forest land in what is now the neighborhood, Jones and Balch cleared trees to create views of Lake Washington and the Cascades. They then sold lots on their land for $450 to $950 and created publicity for their property sales. Their initial success in selling land in View Ridge enabled them to expand their efforts, and they bought more land to reach the current boundaries of View Ridge. The neighborhood was annexed into Seattle in 1942. View Ridge Elementary School was founded with portable classrooms in 1944 and was built in 1948. In the late 1980s, View Ridge became the site of a series of arsons. The first fires occurred in March 1987, when four houses were set on fire in one night, resulting in the death of an elderly couple. In 1989, several more cases of arson were committed in the neighborhood; the arsonists responsible ultimately set forty fires.
