= Sand Point (peninsula) =

Peninsula in Seattle, Washington, United States

Coordinates: 47°40′57.5″N 122°15′16″W

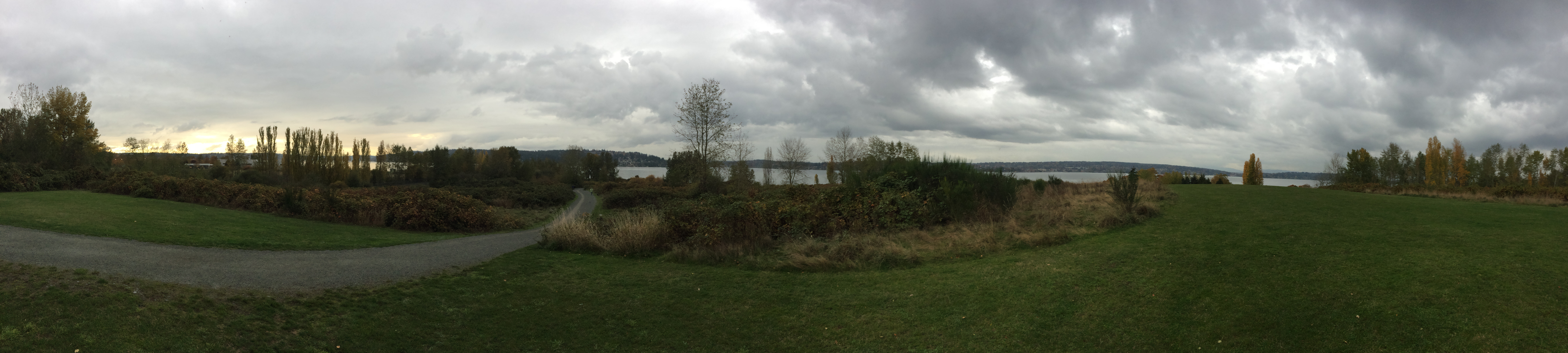
A small hill on Sand Point within Magnuson Park, with a view of Lake Washington on three sides

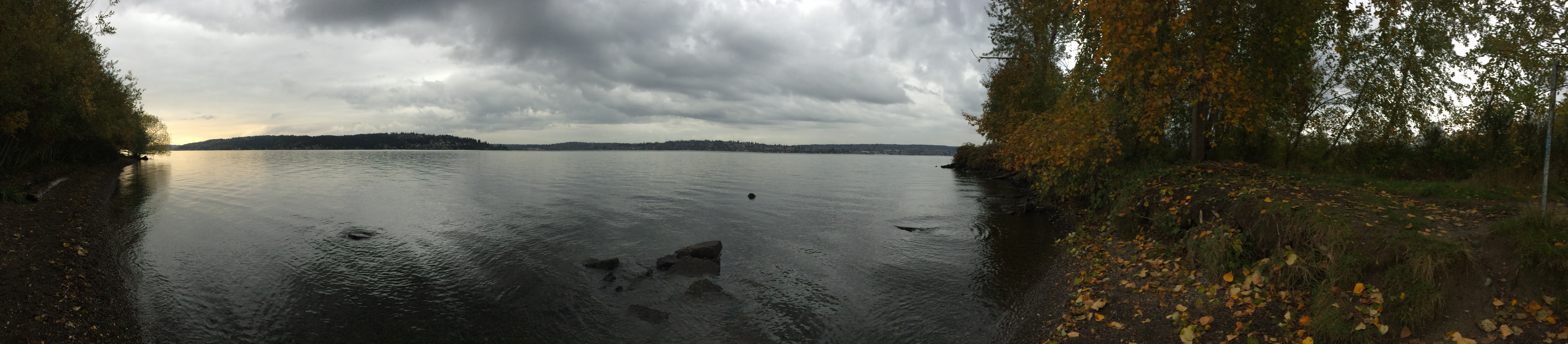
Lake Washington viewed from the shore on Sand Point

Sand Point is a peninsula that juts into Lake Washington from north Seattle, Washington, United States. It is occupied mostly by Magnuson Park and is the namesake of the Sand Point neighborhood to the west of the peninsula. Formerly a U.S. naval air station, it now consists primarily of public park area, but a portion is occupied by a NOAA research center.
