= Laurelhurst, Seattle =

Neighborhood in Seattle

Coordinates: 47°39′37″N 122°16′48″W

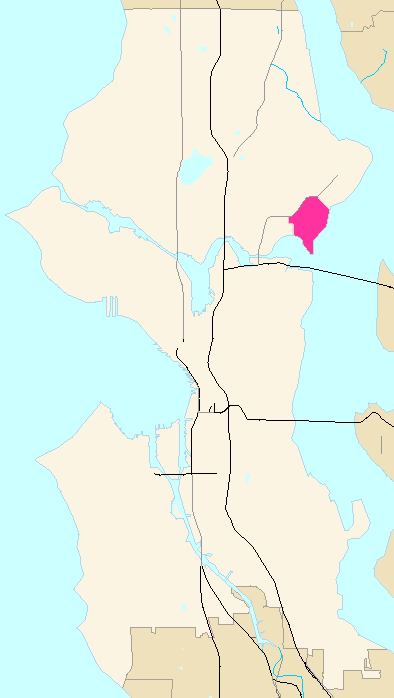
Laurelhurst

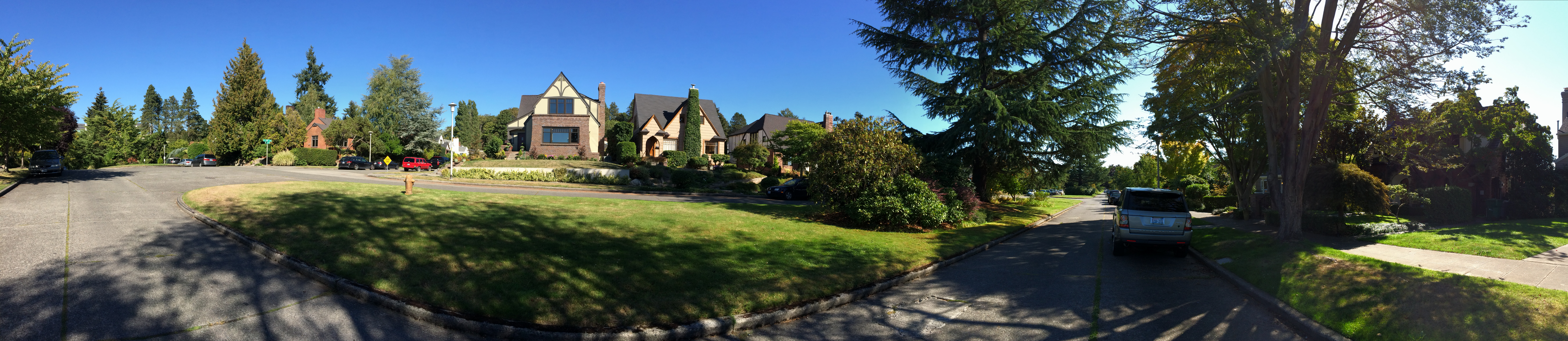
Laurelhurst residential street, near Laurelhurst Park

Laurelhurst is a residential neighborhood in northeastern Seattle, Washington, US. It is bounded on the northeast by Ivanhoe Place N.E., beyond which is Windermere; on the northwest by Sand Point Way N.E. and N.E. 45th Street, beyond which are Hawthorne Hills, Ravenna, and University Village; on the west by Mary Gates Memorial Drive N.E., beyond which is the East Campus of the University of Washington; on the southwest by Union Bay; and on the east by Lake Washington. Seattle Children's Hospital is located in its northwest corner. Once a seasonal campground of the Duwamish people, the neighborhood has been a part of Seattle since its annexation in 1910.

The community center is an official city landmark. The Laurelhurst Beach Club, Laurelhurst Park, and its Laurelhurst Community Center serve as gathering places.

Laurelhurst has had several famous residents, including Melanie Griffith and Antonio Banderas, who rented a house on the waterfront one summer while filming a movie; musician Duff McKagan, bassist for Guns N' Roses. Bill Gates spent part of his childhood there.

The neighborhood is one of the most expensive in Seattle, with median home prices around $1,649,000, over double the overall Seattle median of $735,000, as of September 2018.

== History ==
The Duwamish people have lived in the area around present-day Laurelhurst for thousands of years. On Ravenna Creek, near the current site of University Village, they built the town of sɬuwíɬ (Lushootseed, Little Canoe Channel) with at least five longhouses and a large fishing weir. On Union Bay, the cove of ádid (Dear Me!) was a campsite and gathering spot for the game of sləhal. The tip of the Laurelhurst peninsula was called šabʔaltxw (Drying House) and Whiskey Point, and the cliff shore further north was a clay-harvesting spot called šabʔaltxw (Place of Whitened Clay). White settlers began to claim land in the Seattle area in the 1850s and used legal strategies and violence to force many Duwamish from the land. However, many Native communities remained in the area and worked and traded with the settlers.

In the 1860s, white settlers began to claim forested land on the Laurelhurst peninsula. By then, it was a popular rowing destination for people from the growing settlement of Madison Park, which also hosted a trail toward the peninsula through the Montlake Portage. A road replaced the trail in 1871, helping connect the farms at Laurelhurst to other settlements. By 1887, the new Seattle, Lake Shore & Eastern Railroad served the area.

In 1888, Henry Yesler built a new lumber mill in Union Bay at the present-day site of the University of Washington's Urban Horticulture Center. The same year, the town of Yesler was platted to provide housing for mill workers. It extended from the modern-day 41st St to 45th St, and the Laurel Village development to the Talaris Center. By 1890, a railroad spur connected the mill to the Seattle, Lake Shore & Eastern Railway, but the mill burned down in 1895. A shingle mill later used the property, and it burned down in the 1920s. Coll Thrush speculates that Native employees of Yesler's mill camped at ádid.

=== Platting and annexation ===
The name Laurelhurst dates from between 1906 and 1909, when Joseph McLaughlin and R.F. Booth, incorporated under the name McLaughlin Realty Company, acquired property from several owners in the region. "Laurel" stands for the plant name Laurel and "hurst" means "wood" in archaic English. At the time, much of the region was used as farmland by Joe Surber, the Hildebrand family, and others, and Ellen Little Price owned an estate on Webster Point. McLaughlin Realty and Seaboard Security bought this land, as well as the undeveloped plat of Scottish Heights and part of the town of Yesler Village.^{:26} The Seattle Golf and Country Club had also been founded in Laurelhurst on rented farmland, but the club moved to The Highlands in 1908 after a deal with Seaboard Security.^{:22,26} The developers established new neighborhood names and new plats; brought in water, electricity, and sewer services; but failed to attract a streetcar line, so the neighborhood grew very slowly.^{:26} Some families lived in tents, cabins, or garages in the area as they built new homes.^{:28}

Laurelhurst grew as it gained more transportation connections to Seattle. Beginning in the early 1900s, the Laurelhurst Launch ferry operated between Laurelhurst and Madison Park. The Laurelhurst community also ran a bus service to the University District out of a Ford vehicle. Transportation near the university had improved for the 1909 Alaska-Yukon-Pacific Exposition.

Seattle annexed Laurelhurst in 1910. In 1916, the Lake Washington Ship Canal was completed, lowering the level of Lake Washington and creating new land from Union Bay. In 1920, the Laurelhurst Improvement Club formed, later becoming the Laurelhurst Community Club. By the 1920s, a small Lutheran seminary and St. Stephens Episcopal Church formed, as well as an orphanage run by Missionary Sisters of the Sacred Heart. In 1925, Montlake Bridge created a major new connection between Laurelhurst and the rest of Seattle. The Laurelhurst Improvement Club purchased land to donate to create Laurelhurst Park in 1927. The park was used by the U.S. Army for an army barracks and anti-aircraft gun during World War II.^{:52}

=== Segregation ===
Like many other Seattle neighborhoods, Laurelhurst maintained racial segregation via the widespread adoption of racial restrictive covenants, which banned people of color from owning or renting homes. These covenants became common between 1925 and 1950. In 1933, the Laurelhurst Community Club was upset by the recent move of "a non-Caucasian family" to the neighborhood and appointed a committee to prevent other people of color from living there. The committee's goal was to convince all residents and property owners in the neighborhood to enter into racial restrictive covenants that restricted Laurelhurst homes to "members of the Caucasian race".^{:64}

The Laurelhurst Beach Club began in 1923 as part of the Laurelhurst Improvement Club, only permitting neighborhood residents to become members.^{:55} It split into a private club in 1928 after conflicts over membership requirements and fees.^{:55} After the club redeveloped its beach in 1939, it banned any new Jewish applicants from joining. Local residents and the Anti-Defamation League (ADL) protested the policy for years. In 1955, Sam Tarshis led an ADL investigation of the club, working with Jewish residents of Laurelhurst to create a legal case and public campaign against antisemitism at the club. Their organizing was successful, and in 1956, the club's board unanimously voted to adopt a membership non-discrimination clause blocking discrimination on the basis of "race, religion, creed, or color".

=== Growth ===
After World War II, North Seattle had a housing shortage, spurring apartment and affordable housing construction in Laurelhurst. The University of Washington also created housing in the neighborhood for the families of veterans attending college on the G.I. Bill. Prior Laurelhurst residents protested the new developments but were mostly unsuccessful at stopping them.^{:65,68}

In 1952, Lloyd S. Woodburne began producing wine from his Laurelhurst home for a group that later became Associated Vintners, Washington's first winery to create vitis vinifera-based wines.

In 1953, Seattle Children's, then known as Children's Orthopedic Hospital, moved from Queen Anne to Laurelhurst to be closer to the University of Washington's Medical and Dental School. Laurelhurst residents and the Community Club protested the hospital relocation, prompting the hospital to make concessions.^{:65} Battelle Memorial Institute opened its Seattle Research Center in the neighborhood in 1967.^{:65}

== Education ==
Laurelhurst is home to Laurelhurst Elementary School, Villa Academy, an independent grade school, the Wu Hsing Tao School, and the Seattle Midwifery School.

Thelma Dewitty, the first Black teacher within Seattle Public Schools (SPS), taught at Laurelhurst Elementary for a period and democratized teacher supply access and lunchroom seating there. During the 1970s, SPS began desegregating its schools: Laurelhurst Elementary was mainly attended by white students taught by white teachers. In 1976, SPS transferred Aki Kurose to teach there, where she faced scrutiny because of her race. She met with neighborhood parents before the school year and initially taught there with two parental observers in her classroom. Two years later, SPS began busing students of color to Laurelhurst.

== News sources ==
The community was served by the North Seattle Herald-Outlook, which printed a weekly edition until it was shut down in January 2012 by owner Pacific Publishing Company.

== Controversies ==
In 2026, a viral social media post drew attention to the relationship between the Laurelhurst Community Council (LCC) and Seattle Children's Hospital. Concerned about noise from helicopters using the hospital's helipad, the LCC successfully lobbied in 1992 to have Seattle Children's Hospital enter a voluntary agreement with the City of Seattle where only the most serious cases would land at the hospital. Patients that are not in critical enough condition are forced to land at a helipad located at the University of Washington and then travel by ambulance the final one mile to the hospital. The Laurelhurst Community Council has a long history with Seattle Children's Hospital, repeatedly opposing hospital expansion and placing limits on hospital staff parking on nearby streets. However, the Council is not involved in the helipad operations or the Medical Review Committee and supports the hospital’s effort to remove it. The Laurelhurst Community Council “fully supports helipad landings for all children requiring intensive and lifesaving care.”
