= Windermere, Seattle =

Neighborhood in North Seattle

Coordinates: 47°40′11″N 122°15′39″W

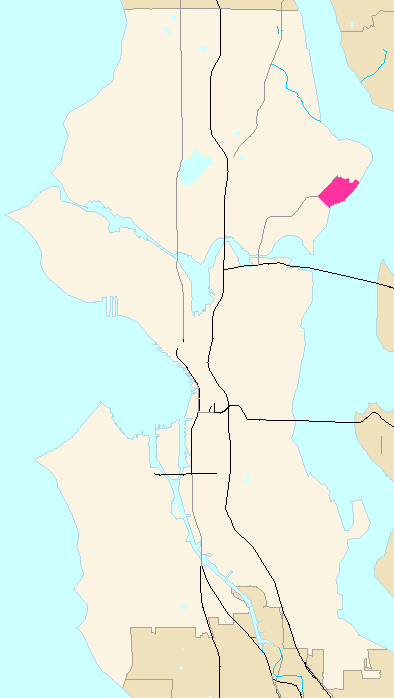
Windermere

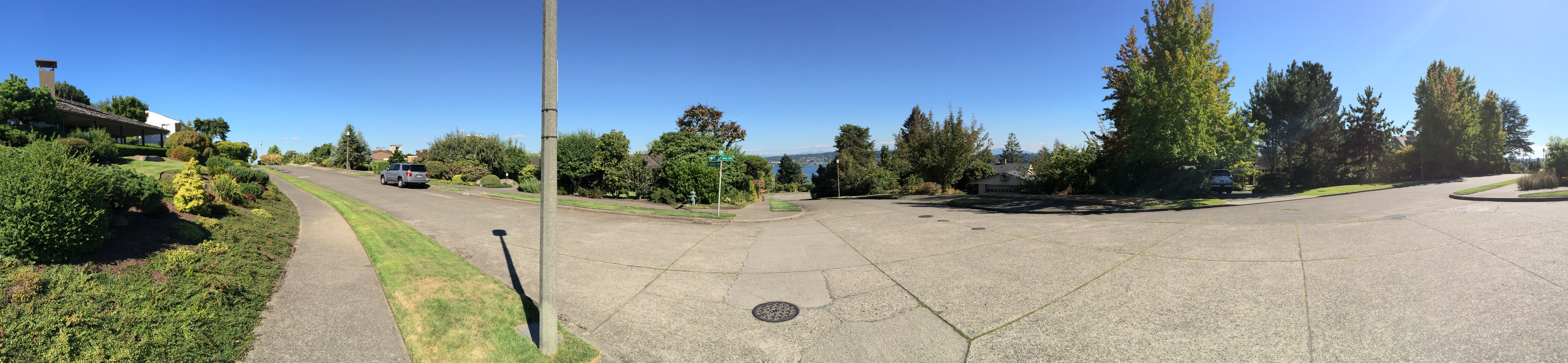
Residential area near the center of Windermere, overlooking Lake Washington

Windermere is a residential neighborhood in northeastern Seattle, Washington, named after Windermere in England's Lake District. It is bounded on the north by Magnuson Park, part of Sand Point; on the northwest by Sand Point Way N.E., beyond which is Hawthorne Hills; on the southwest by Ivanhoe Place N.E., beyond which is Laurelhurst; and on the southeast by Lake Washington. The area has been a part of Seattle since 1910.

The neighborhood is home to the National Archives at Seattle, which is located on Sand Point Way (State Route 513).
