= Hawthorne Hills, Seattle =

Neighborhood in Seattle, Washington, US

Coordinates: 47°40′19″N 122°16′32″W

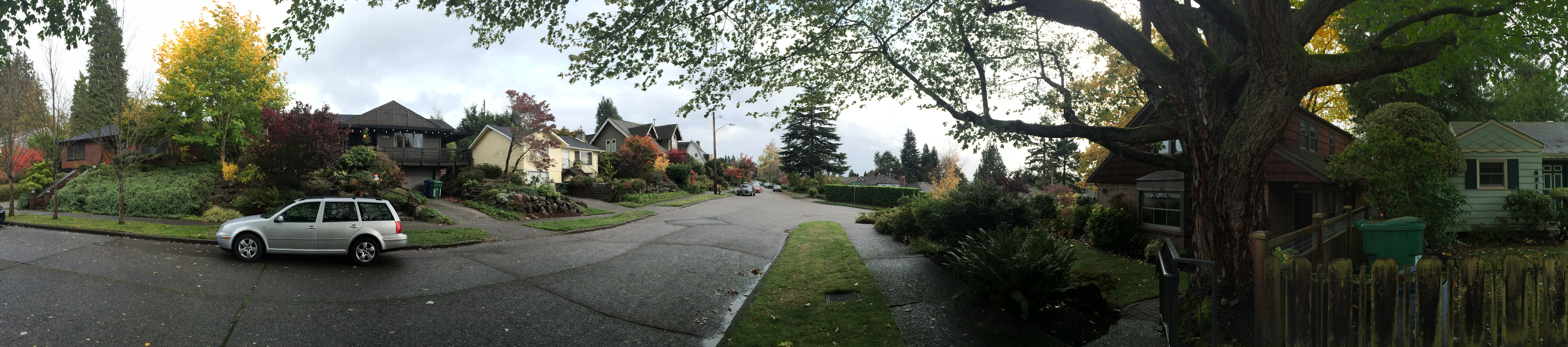
The Hawthorne Hills neighborhood on an overcast day

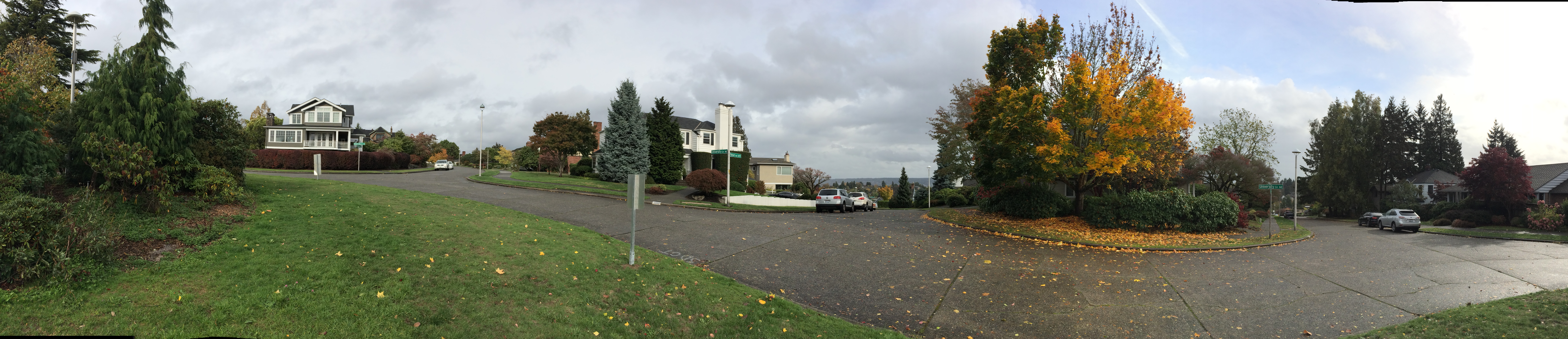
University Circle, at the center of the Hawthorne Hills neighborhood

Hawthorne Hills is a residential neighborhood in Seattle, Washington. It is officially split between the neighborhoods of Bryant and Windermere, but is generally recognized as a distinct neighborhood. The northern boundary is Northeast 65th Street. The southern and eastern boundary is Sand Point Way. The western boundary is 40th Avenue Northeast. Hawthorne Hills is bounded on the north by View Ridge, on the east by Windermere, on the south by Laurelhurst, and on the west by Bryant. There is a sign for the neighborhood along Sand Point Way.

The neighborhood is named after Hawthorne Kingsbury Dent, a prominent Seattle insurance executive in the early 1900s who owned most of what is now named Hawthorne Hills. However, before Dent sold his land in 1928, the area around 40th Ave NE at NE 55th Street was marked on maps as Keith, named after settler Jacob Keith who owned land there from 1880 to 1887. Keith Station was a stop on the Seattle, Lake Shore & Eastern Railroad, the site of which is now in the Burke-Gilman Playground Park just across the Burke-Gilman Trail from Metropolitan Market.

According to a 2013 analysis by Seattle Met Magazine and Zillow of 101 Seattle neighborhoods, Hawthorne Hills has the second-highest median household income of any Seattle neighborhood ($111,671, behind only Laurelhurst), and ranks 6th of 98 in median home value. This analysis also indicated that Hawthorne Hills had the lowest crime rate of all 101 Seattle neighborhoods.

Many streets in the neighborhood run against the standard north–south/west-east Seattle grid and are named after college towns (e.g., Stanford, Princeton, Purdue, etc.). University Circle Park, which has views to Downtown Seattle and the Space Needle, is at the center of these streets. The southern part of Hawthorne Hills includes a portion of the Burke-Gilman Trail. Hawthorne Hills is located about two miles east of the University District, and serves as a bedroom community for many University of Washington professors and staffers. The neighborhood is home to Seattle Fire Station 38, Metropolitan Market Sand Point, Bryant Neighborhood Playground, Burke-Gilman Playground Park, National Archives and Records, the Center for Spiritual Living, and Congregation Shaarei Tefilah-Lubavitch.
