= Naval Station Puget Sound =

Former United States Naval station near Seattle, WA

- Naval Air Station Seattle
- Sand Point, Seattle, Washington in the United States
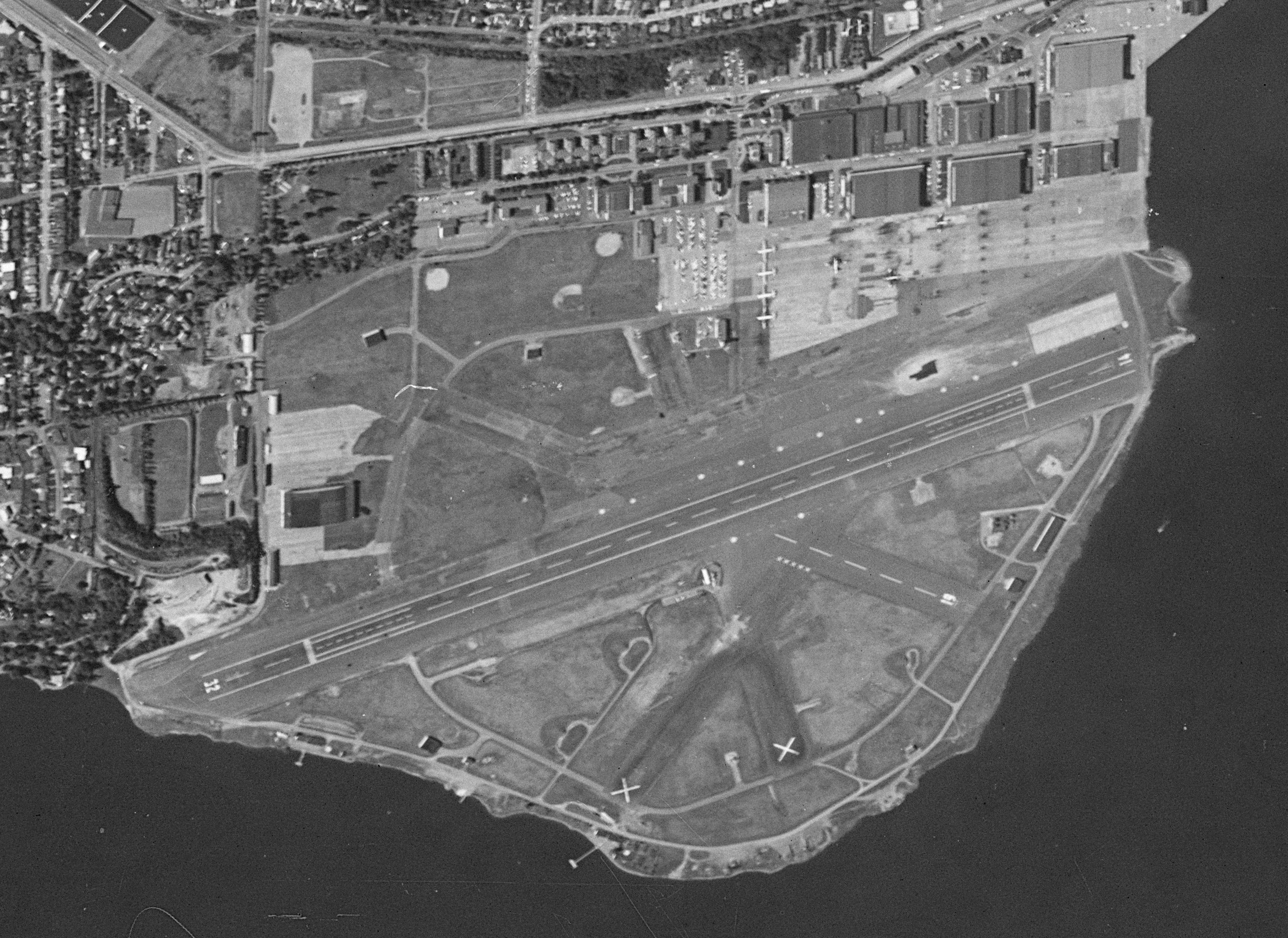

Site information
- Type: Navy base and naval air station
- Owner: Department of Defense
- Operator: US Navy
- Condition: Closed

Location
- Location in the United States
- Coordinates: 47°40′55.1″N 122°15′19.7″W

Site history
- Built: 1922
- In use: 1922–1995
- Fate: Redeveloped as Magnuson Park
- Events: First aerial circumnavigation (1924)

U.S. National Register of Historic Places

U.S. National Historic Landmark District
- Designated: 2 July 2010
- Reference no.: 09001218
- Periods of significance: 1925–1949; 1950–1974
- Areas of significance: Architecture; Military

Seattle Landmark
- Official name: Sand Point Naval Air Station Landmark District
- Designated: 16 March 2011

Naval Station Puget Sound is a former United States Naval station located on Sand Point in Seattle, Washington. Today, the land is occupied by Magnuson Park.

== History ==
The area around Sand Point and Pontiac Bay was donated to the Seattle city government in 1918 by Morgan J. Carkeek to form a new city park, which was named Carkeek Park. The 23-acre (9.3 ha) park was condemned by the federal government in 1926 for use as a naval air station; a $25,000 payment was used to establish new Carkeek Park on the west side of the city, north of Ballard on Puget Sound.

In 1922 the U.S. Navy began construction on the site, which it was leasing from the county, and in 1926 the Navy was deeded the 413-acre (1.67 km^{2}) field outright. This deed amounted to a public gift of $500,000 from the county to the Navy (equivalent to $7.07 million in 2024 dollars) The Seattle Chamber of Commerce—a commercial entity—had done the same thing for the Army 28 years before with Fort Lawton, much of which is now Discovery Park.

Sand Point Airfield was the endpoint of the first aerial circumnavigation of the world in 1924. The historic flight helped convince Congress to develop Sand Point as a Naval Air Station.

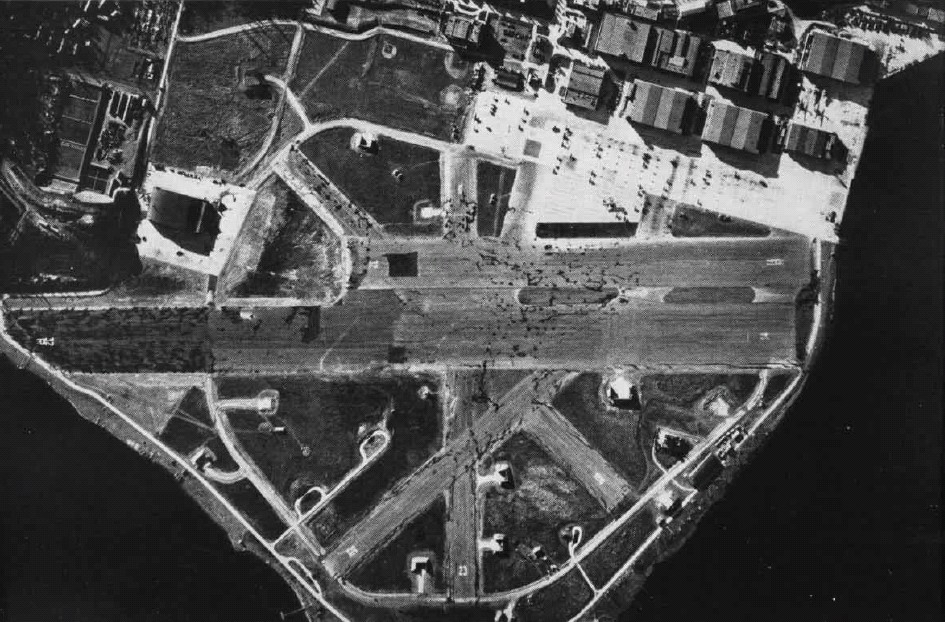
Aerial photograph of Naval Air Station Seattle in the 1940s.

The former grass runways were paved in 1940–41, just prior to the U.S. entering World War II. The primary runway was aligned 14/32 and was just under a mile in length at 5050 feet (1539 m).

During its years of operation, Naval Station Puget Sound was used as a facility to train naval aviators. Several trainer aircraft were forced to ditch in Lake Washington over the years due to pilot error or aircraft malfunction. The wrecks of these aircraft still remain submerged near present-day Magnuson Park, where they are often visited by local divers:

- 1956 – PB4Y Privateer crashed shortly after takeoff when the pilot missed setting the flaps. The aircraft now sits under 155' of water near the boat ramp at Magnuson Park.
- 1947 – PV-2 Harpoon crashed on approach to Sand Point Naval Air Station runway. The aircraft now sits under 140' of water off Sand Point.

=== Deactivation ===
NAS Seattle was deactivated in 1970 and the airfield was shut down; the reduced base was renamed "Naval Support Activity Seattle." Negotiations began as to who would receive the surplus property. In 1975 a large portion of the Navy's land was given to the City of Seattle and to the National Oceanic and Atmospheric Administration (NOAA). The city's land was largely developed as a park and named Sand Point Park. In 1977, it was renamed Magnuson Park in honor of longtime U.S. Senator Warren Magnuson, a former naval officer from Seattle. The airfield runways were demolished in the late 1970s and new construction on the north end for NOAA was completed in 1982 (photo – 1981). The installation was renamed "Naval Station Puget Sound" in 1986 and recommended for closure in April 1991, and the remaining land was divided among several entities, including the city. The base was formally closed four years later in September 1995.

The former naval station was added to the National Register of Historic Places July 2, 2010 as Naval Air Station (NAS) Seattle and designated a Seattle landmark as the Sand Point Naval Air Station Historic District on March 16, 2011. Since then, many of the buildings have been redeveloped as affordable housing, sports facilities, artist studios, breweries and more.
