= VPB-139 =

Patrol Bombing Squadron 139
- Active: 1 April 1943 – 13 September 1945
- Country: United States of America
- Branch: United States Navy
- Type: squadron
- Role: Maritime patrol
- Nickname: Vee-Bees
- Engagements: World War II

Aircraft flown
- Patrol: PV-1; PV-2

VPB-139 was a Patrol Bombing Squadron of the U.S. Navy. The squadron was established as Bombing Squadron 139 (VB-139) on 1 April 1943, redesignated Patrol Bombing Squadron 139 (VPB-139) on 1 October 1944 and disestablished on 13 September 1945.

== Operational history ==
- 1 April 1943: VB-139 was established at Ault Field, NAS Whidbey Island, Washington, under the operational control of FAW-6, as a medium bombing squadron flying the PV-1 Ventura. Ground school and familiarization flights in the Ventura continued at NAS Whidbey Island until the end of July. On 22 July, the squadron was relocated to NAS Alameda, California, where new instrument panels were installed in all of the aircraft. Upon returning to NAS Whidbey Island, the squadron flight crews began training with a new instrument flying syllabus.
- 1 October 1943: VB-139 departed NAS Whidbey Island for its first combat tour in three five-plane sections, arriving at NAF Amchitka, Aleutians, between 7 and 10 October. The squadron then came under the operational control of FAW-4 and was assigned routine search sectors. Missions were generally uneventful, but weather always posed a serious hazard. Yet despite the poor weather conditions, the ground crews always managed to have the Venturas ready for the next mission.
- 1 November 1943: A three-aircraft detachment was sent to NAS Adak, Alaska, for patrol duties and special training. On 8 December, three other squadron aircraft relieved this detachment. The first detachment continued on to a new assignment at NAS Attu, Aleutians.
- 10 December 1943: The entire squadron relocated to NAS Attu, relieving VP-136. Routine searches out to 350 miles (560 km) to 550 miles (890 km) were conducted until 19 January 1944, when the squadron undertook several photographic reconnaissance and bombing missions over the northern Kurile Islands. Occasionally, attacks were made on picket boats as well. On one such attack an aircraft was badly shot up, and the copilot, Lieutenant (jg) Clifford Thambs, was killed. Planned shipping attacks generally never came about due to the vagaries of the weather. Icing was always a problem and crews never knew after returning from a mission whether the home field would be socked in with heavy fog. On one mission during this period, Lieutenant W. S. Whitman and his crew of five never returned and were listed as missing in action.
- 19 January – April 1944: Lieutenant Mantius of VB-136 had earlier demonstrated that the PV-1 could fly operationally as far as the Kuriles. On 19 May, Lieutenants R. A. MacGregor, D. M. Birdsall, and T. H. McKelvey made the first night flights over the same area in VB-139 Venturas. Until this flight, it had been assumed that only the B-24 and PBY aircraft had the range to make strikes on the Kuriles. For the next four months the squadron became a part of Empire Express missions over the Kuriles, making photographic runs and bombing through the clouds.
- 30 June 1944: VB-139 was relieved for return to NAS Whidbey Island. Upon arrival, personnel were given home leave.
- 1 August 1944 – February 1945: VB-139 reformed at NAS Whidbey Island, under the operational control of FAW-6. The squadron received all new equipment and aircraft, the PV-2 Harpoon. During January, the crews spent a great deal of time in HVAR rocket-projectile firing. Much emphasis was placed on mastering the new GCA equipment. NAS Attu had recently installed this new form of landing control, and it greatly reduced the risks faced by the squadron when returning from long missions and had the field covered by fog. Training and flight familiarization was completed by the end of February 1945.
- 26 February 1945: VPB-139 deployed to NAS Attu, arriving on 16 March. It relieved VPB-136. Upon arrival the squadron came under the operational control of FAW-4 and was assigned routine searches and patrols in conjunction with VPB-131.
- 27 March 1945: One of the squadron aircraft crashed on Shemya and burned, but the crew was able to exit safely and without injury.
- 6 April – June 1945: Four VPB-139 Harpoons attacked Kokutan Zaki, Kuriles, with rockets and machine guns. On 6 May, attacks against ground targets were stopped on the order of BuAer. Problems with the strength of the wings and stabilizers on high-G pullouts over the targets confined Harpoon squadrons thereafter to patrols and occasional attacks on surface vessels until the HEDRONs and PATSUs made repairs. Throughout the month of May searches and photographic runs were made over Minami Zaki and the Okhotsk areas in the Kuriles. Little enemy fighter opposition was ever encountered on these missions. Anti-aircraft (AA) fire, however, was always present. On 10 May, a group of eight aircraft attacked radar installations at Minami Zaki, Shimushu, and five of the eight were hit by AA fire. All returned to base with no casualties. On 22 April Lieutenant William D. See and his crew of five failed to return from a patrol and were listed as missing inaction. In June, the squadron made several strikes on Shimushu and numerous ships in the harbors. Although fighter opposition was often present, few attacks were ever pressed home.
- 24 July 1945: A detachment of six VPB-139 aircraft was relocated to NAF Amchitka, with the rest remaining at NAS Attu. Duties consisted of routine patrols, searches and mail runs between the island outposts.
- 20 August – 13 September 1945: VPB-139 was relieved by VPB-135 for return to NAS Seattle, Washington, arriving on 23 August less one aircraft with a breakdown at NAS Kodiak. All aircraft were turned over to HEDRON-6, and all personnel were given extension or demobilization orders on 31 August. Squadron files arrived from NAS Attu on 11 September, and the squadron was disestablished on 13 September 1945.

== Aircraft assignments ==
The squadron was assigned the following aircraft, effective on the dates shown:

- PV-1 - May 1943
- PV-2 - August 1944

== Home port assignments ==
The squadron was assigned to these home ports, effective on the dates shown:

- NAS Whidbey Island, Washington - 1 April 1943
- NAF Amchitka, Aleutians - 7 October 1943
- NAS Attu, Aleutians - 10 December 1943
- NAS Whidbey Island - 30 June 1944
- NAS Attu - 26 February 1945
- NAS Seattle, Washington - 23 August 1945

== See also ==
- Maritime patrol aircraft
- List of inactive United States Navy aircraft squadrons
- List of United States Navy aircraft squadrons
- List of squadrons in the Dictionary of American Naval Aviation Squadrons
- History of the United States Navy
