= VPB-24 =

Patrol Bombing Squadron 24
- Active: 7 January 1930 – 20 June 1945
- Country: United States of America
- Branch: United States Navy
- Type: squadron
- Role: Maritime patrol
- Engagements: World War II

Aircraft flown
- Patrol: PD-1/PM-1; PBY-1/2/3/4/5/5A

VPB-24 was a Patrol Bombing Squadron of the U.S. Navy. The squadron was established as Patrol Squadron 9-S (VP-9S) on 7 January 1930, redesignated Patrol Squadron 9-B (VP-9B) on 1 October 1930, redesignated Patrol Squadron 9-F (VP-9F) on 26 October 1931, redesignated Patrol Squadron 9 (VP-9) on 1 October 1937, redesignated Patrol Squadron 12 (VP-12) on 1 July 1939, redesignated Patrol Squadron 24 (VP-24) on 1 August 1941, redesignated Patrol Bombing Squadron 24 (VPB-24) on 1 October 1944 and disestablished on 20 June 1945.

== Operational history ==
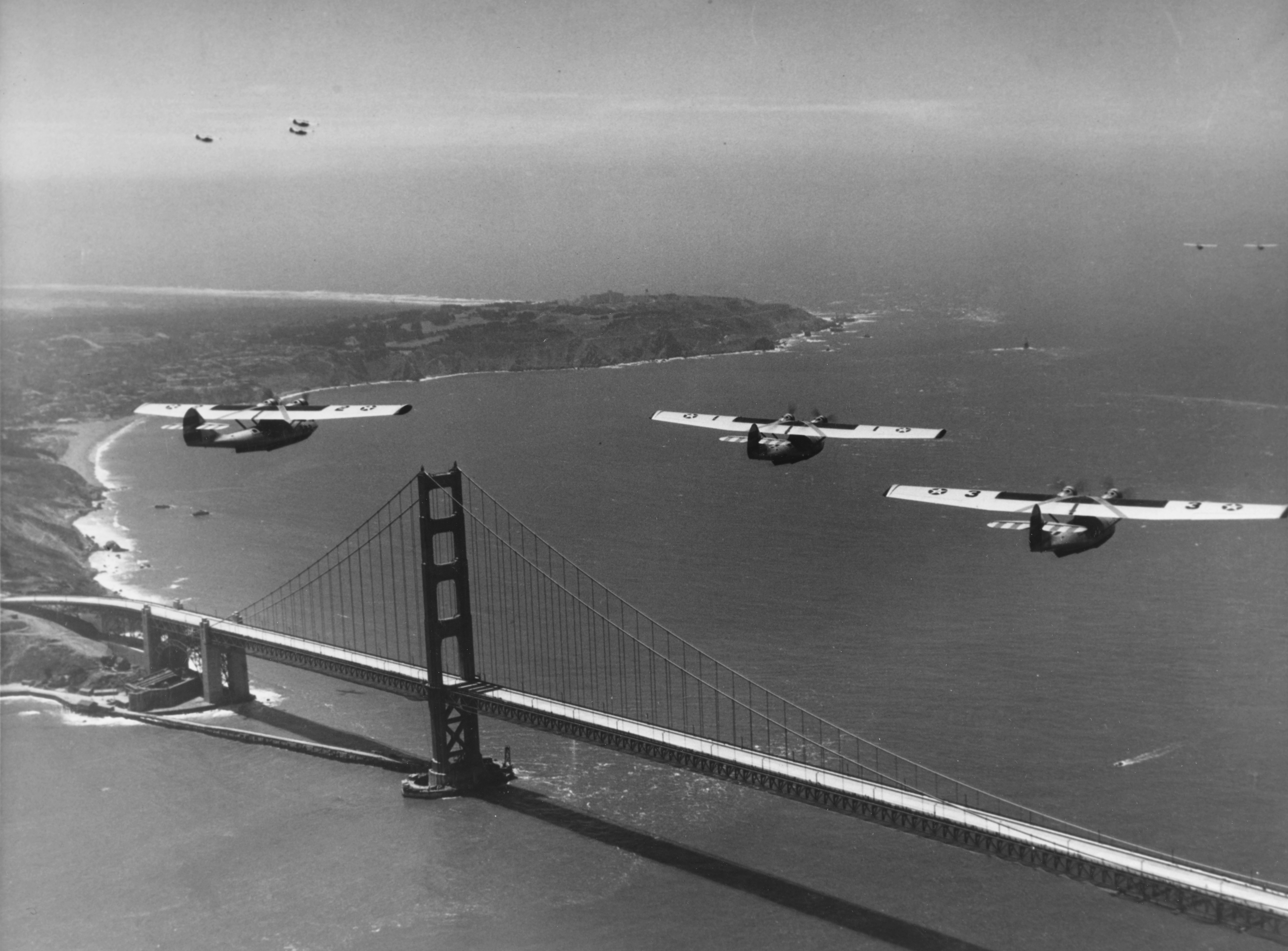
VP-9 PBY-1s fly over the Golden Gate Bridge in May 1937

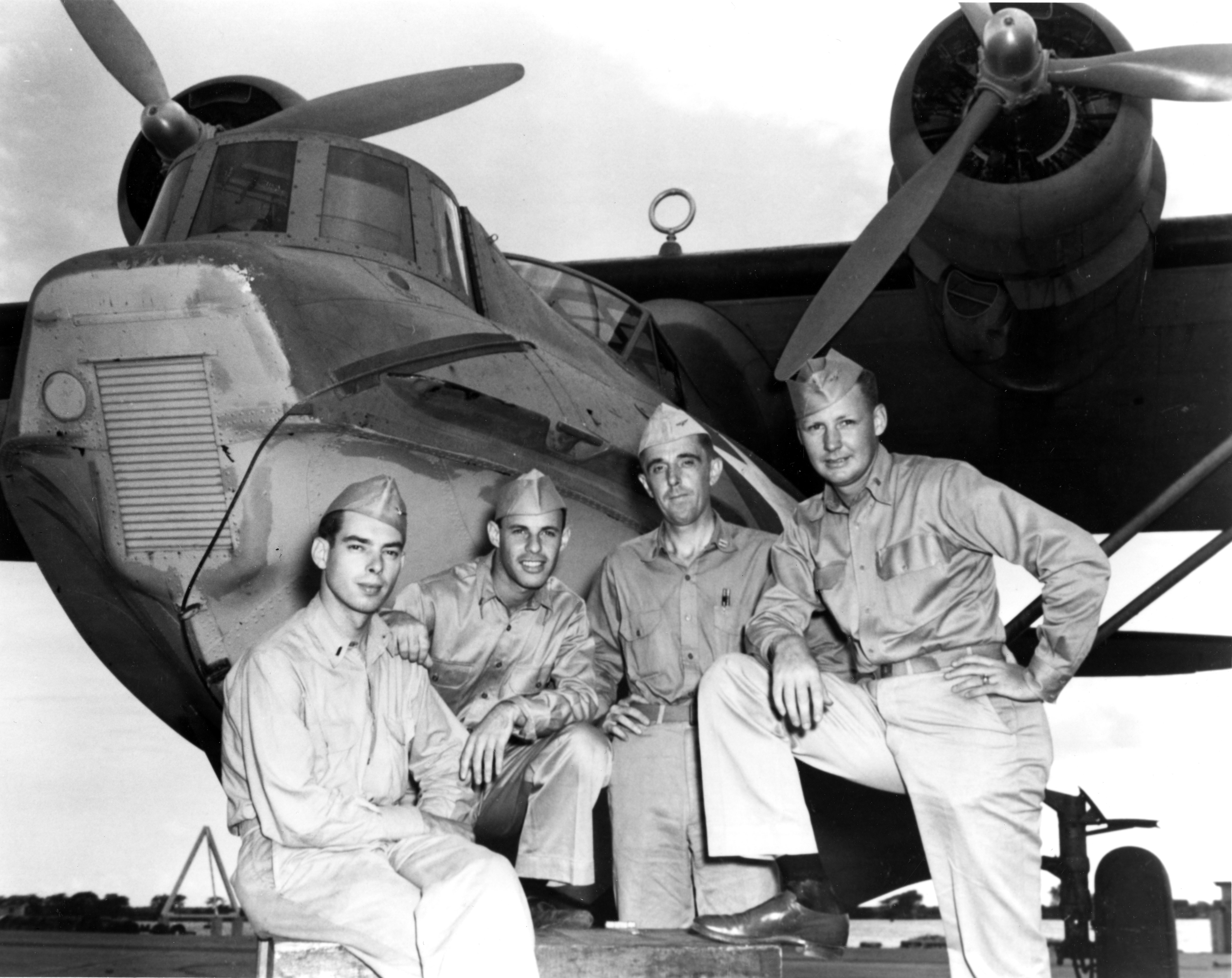
VP-24 crew in front of a PBY-5A in June 1942

- 7 January 1930: VP-9S was established at NAS Hampton Roads, Virginia, as a command under Scouting Fleet.
- 1 October 1930: VP-9S was redesignated VP-9B during the reorganization from Scouting Fleet to Battle Force.
- 26 October 1931: VP-9B was redesignated VP-9F during another reorganization, this time as an element under Base Force.
- 22 April 1935: The squadron participated in exercises in Alaska flying from Humboldt Bay and Sitka. USS Gannet and USS Wright provided tendersupport during the cold weather operations. The crews found it extremely difficult to start engines and moor aircraft in the cold, rough seas.
- 1 October 1937: VP-9F was redesignated VP-9 as a result of the reorganization of patrol squadrons under Patrol Wings. VP-9 came under the operational control of PatWing-1, based at NAS San Diego, California.
- 18 January 1938: VPs 9 and 10 conducted a record-breaking flight with 18 PBY-1 aircraft, flying from NAS San Diego, to Naval Station Pearl Harbor, Hawaii. Upon delivery of the aircraft, the crews returned to San Diego aboard SS Matsonia.
- 17 March 1938: The combined squadrons of PatWing-1 (VPs 7, 9, 11 and 12) and PatWing-4 (VPs 16, 17, 19) participated in Fleet Problem XIX (Phase II), as a part of White Force. The squadrons conducted patrol sweeps at distances of 600 miles (970 km) from Black Force, successfully attacking and damaging major elements of the enemy forces. The exercises marked the Navy's first use of long-distance radio bearings as an aid to aerial navigation.
- 25 June 1938: VP-9 and the other squadrons of PatWing-1 departed NAS San Diego for NAS Kodiak, Alaska, on a three-month deployment.
- 13 August 1938: VP-9 hosted Hollywood photographers during the filming of a movie about the Navy. Part of the action being filmed was the squadron's participation in Fleet Exercise XIX.
- 11 January 1939: The squadron flew with the rest of PatWing-1 to NAS Coco Solo, Panama Canal Zone, for training exercises in the Caribbean area. PatWing-1 returned to San Diego from the deployment on 10 May 1939.
- 1 August 1941: VP-12 was redesignated VP-24 and relocated to NAS Kaneohe Bay, Hawaii, under PatWing-2.
- 1 October 1941: VP-24 transferred from NAS Kaneohe to NAS Ford Island, Hawaii.
- 7 December 1941: The squadron's six aircraft were among the few spared during the Attack on Pearl Harbor. Its planes were conducting joint submarine exercises off the coast of Hawaii when the attack came; the crews were subsequently given sectors by radio to conduct searches for the attacking Japanese forces. Having made no enemy contact, the squadron returned to NAS Ford Island to begin the cleanup and restoration of its devastated facilities.
- 31 May 1942: VP-24 was directed to send one PBY-5A and three crews in a detachment to Midway Island. The detachment was involved in the Battle of Midway, the next day. The group remained on Midway until 17 July 1942, when it returned to NAS Pearl Harbor.
- 21 September 1942: A three-plane detachment was sent to Luganville Seaplane Base, Espiritu Santo, with tender support by USS Curtiss.
- 1 October 1942: VP-24 transferred its assets and personnel back to NAS Kaneohe Bay. Five PBY-5A aircraft were traded to VP-23 for nonamphibian PBY-5s before the move, since the amphibian version would not be needed in the South Pacific, where VP-24 was soon to be sent. Most of the squadron's coming operations would be based afloat, serviced by seaplane tenders. Many of the flight crews actually preferred the older PBY-5, as they felt that the retractable gear of the newer PBY-5A added to the weight of the aircraft, reducing power and range.
- 1 November 1942: Two additional aircraft were sent to Espiritu Santo to supplement the original detachment, bringing it up to six operational planes.
- 1 Feb 1943: The remainder of VP-24 began to transfer by detachments to Espiritu Santo. The transfers were completed by April.
- 30 March 1943: VP-24 conducted Dumbo (air-sea rescue) missions for the forces taking part in the New Georgia Campaign, concluding on 29 September 1943. This was the first time that an entire squadron had assumed Dumbo work as its primary duty. The squadron rescued or evacuated 466 men during the campaign.
- 29 September 1943: Preparations were made to depart Espiritu Santo for return to NAS Kaneohe Bay and eventual return to the United States.
- 7 December 1943: VP-24 was given home leave while administrative details covering reforming of the squadron and reassignment of personnel were undertaken. Training of new personnel and reforming of the squadron began at NAS San Diego on 1 January 1944. In mid-March all of the squadron aircraft were given coats of flat black paint, droppable wing tanks were attached, and improvements in radar and flight instruments were made.
- 27 March 1944: VP-24 made its second trans-Pacific flight to NAS Kaneohe Bay. Upon arrival combat patrols and training missions were conducted concurrently.
- 9 May 1944: Lieutenant (jg) Wade Hampton was lost with his entire crew while on patrol. His last reported message gave a position 150 miles (240 km) from Midway.
- 11 June 1944: The squadron arrived at Majuro Airfield in the Marshalls chain. Typical Black Cat night bombing missions were conducted, along with more mundane Dumbo and patrol missions.
- 27 June 1944: Lieutenant (jg) Mancini attempted to land in rough seas to rescue a downed fighter pilot 1 mile (1.6 km) from a Japanese-held island. Both engines broke off on impact and the hull of the aircraft split in two. The entire crew managed to get into life rafts, and joined the fighter pilot in awaiting rescue. A destroyer had overheard the message from the aircraft and rushed to the scene in time to rescue the aircrews before they washed ashore on the island.
- 1 October 1944: VP-24 was redesignated VPB-24 while based at Majuro. Duties remained essentially the same during this period.
- 10 October 1944: A detachment of three aircraft and crews was formed and sent to Eniwetok to provide Dumbo coverage for air operations in the area. On 19 October the squadron was broken down into smaller one-and two-aircraft detachments that were sent to Apamama, Makin, Tarawa, Roi, Saipan and Guam. Through 1 December 1944, the squadron rescued 25 aircrew without surface assistance.
- 28 October 1944: Ensign Troy C. Beavers received a call to medevac a crew member of an LCI who had a suspected case of acute appendicitis. Beavers landed near the ship and loaded the patient aboard. During the liftoff a rogue wave struck the starboard float, ripping off the wing. The crew and patient exited the aircraft before it sank and were picked up by the LCI.
- 23 January 1945: The VPB-24 detachments were reformed with two aircraft at Eniwetok, four at Kwajalein, one at Tarawa and one at Roi.
- 1 February 1945: The various detachments of the squadron reformed on Majuro to conduct missions in support of the psychological warfare campaign against defending Japanese forces on the island of Wotje. Additional duties included continuing Dumbo missions.
- 25 April 1945: VPB-24 was relieved at Majuro Atoll by VH-5. Elements of the squadron proceeded to NAS Kaneohe Bay for transport back to the United States.
- 1 May 1945: The personnel of the squadron loaded aboard USS Hollandia for transport to NAS North Island, San Diego, California.
- 20 June 1945: VPB-24 was disestablished at NAS North Island.

== Aircraft assignments ==
The squadron was assigned the following aircraft, effective on the dates shown:

- PD-1 - 1931
- PM-1 - 1931
- PBY-1 - August 1937
- PBY-2 - January 1938
- PBY-3 - June 1938
- PBY-4 - October 1939
- PBY-5 - 1940
- PBY-5A - April 1942

== Home port assignments ==
The squadron was assigned to these home ports, effective on the dates shown:

- NAS Hampton Roads, Virginia - 7 January 1930
- NAS San Diego, California - 1930
- NAS Kaneohe Bay, Hawaii - 1 August 1941
- NAS Ford Island, Hawaii - 1 October 1941
- NAS Kaneohe Bay - 1 October 1942
- NAS San Diego - December 1943
- NAS Kaneohe Bay - March 1944
- NAS San Diego - 1 May 1945

== See also ==
- Maritime patrol aircraft
- List of inactive United States Navy aircraft squadrons
- List of United States Navy aircraft squadrons
- List of squadrons in the Dictionary of American Naval Aviation Squadrons
- History of the United States Navy
