= VP-21 =

Patrol Squadron 21
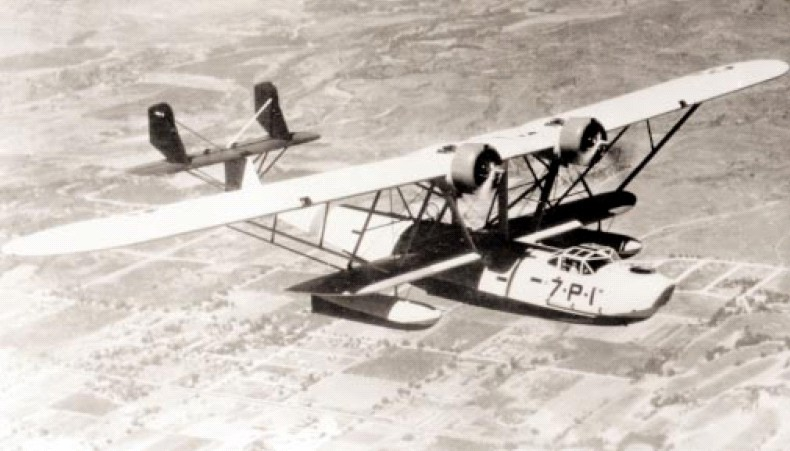
- VP-7F P2Y-3 in 1936
- Active: 23 July 1929 – 18 April 1942
- Country: United States of America
- Branch: United States Navy
- Type: squadron
- Role: Maritime patrol
- Engagements: World War II

Aircraft flown
- Patrol: NB-1; PM-1/PD-1; P2Y-3; PBY-1/2/3/4/5

VP-21 was a Patrol Squadron of the U.S. Navy. The squadron was established as Patrol Squadron 7-B (VP-7B) on 23 July 1929, redesignated Patrol Squadron 7-F (VP-7F) on 1 July 1931, redesignated Patrol Squadron 7 (VP-7) on 1 October 1937, redesignated Patrol Squadron 11 (VP-11) on 1 July 1939, redesignated Patrol Squadron 21 (VP-21) on 1 February 1941 and disestablished on 18 April 1942, with the squadron assets merged with VP-101. It was the third squadron to be designated VP-21, the first VP-21 was redesignated VP-45 on 1 July 1939 and the second VP-21 was redesignated VP-1 on 30 July 1940.

== Operational history ==
- 23 July 1929: Patrol Squadron 7-B was established at NAS San Diego, California, with six NB-1 floatplanes from the assets of the disestablished squadron VN-7D11. VP-7B came under the operational command of the Battle Fleet. Tender support was provided at that time by USS Aroostook. PD-1 aircraft soon replaced the NB-1s. Training of flight crews continued through February 1930.
- 26 June 1930: The squadron set a flight endurance record for the PD-1, remaining in the air for 18 hours.
- 1 July 1931: VP-7B was redesignated VP-7F as a result of a 1 December 1930 reorganization that placed the squadron under the operational command of the Base Force.
- 21 April 1934: VP-7F participated in a fleet exercise with VPs 2F, 3F, 5F and 9F to test the ability of the aircraft tenders to move with the fleet. The exercise concluded on 28 May 1934.
- 1 August 1934: VP-7F conducted an exercise with VP- 9F in Alaskan waters to test the ability of tenders to provide advance base support in cold weather conditions. Tenders participating in the exercise were USS Wright, USS Avocet, USS Sandpiper and USS Swan.
- 22 April 1935: VPs 7F and 9F returned to operations off Humboldt Bay and Sitka, Alaska. USS Gannet and USS Wright provided tender support.
- 1935: VPs 7F, 1F, 4F, 6F, 8F, 9F and 10F participated in Fleet Problem XVI in the area off Midway Island.
- 1 October 1937: VP-7F came under the operational command of PatWing-1, following the establishment of the Patrol Wing concept.
- 17 March 1938: VPs 7, 9, 11, 12, 16, 17 and 19 participated in Fleet Problem XIX (Phase II) as part of White Force, operating against Black Force. Patrol sectors were covered at an extreme range of 600 miles (970 km) in the new PBY-1 and PBY-2 aircraft, using for the first time long-distance radio bearings for navigation. Results of the tests showed major estimated damage to the Black Force by the attacking air elements of White Force.
- 25 June 1938: VP-7 departed with the other elements of PatWing-1 (VPs 9, 11 and 12) for cold weather exercises in the area of Kodiak, Alaska. USS Wright provided tender support for the operation.
- 15 January 1940: VP-11 participated in joint Army-Navy exercises in setting up advance bases in the San Francisco, California, area. The conclusion of the exercises pointed out major deficiencies in the "bird" class AVP small seaplane tenders which were found to be deficient in the amount of berthing spaces, adequacy of galleys and supply-carrying capacity.
- 15 December 1940: VP-21 received orders to transfer to a new home base at Ford Island, Naval Base Pearl Harbor, Hawaii. The trans-Pacific flight of 12 PBY-3 and PBY-4 aircraft began on 31 December 1940 with all arriving safely on 1 January 1941.
- 15 November 1941: The squadron was assigned Wake Island as its wartime battle station. In mid-November the squadron packed up, publicly for "fleet exercises," and headed for Wake with Midway Island as a stopping point. En route the squadron flew Anti-submarine warfare (ASW) patrols for USS Enterprise and USS Lexington, which were carrying United States Marine Corps fighters and dive-bombers to Wake and Midway. The squadron arrived at Midway on 1 December 1941 and began operations.
- 7 December 1941: VP-21 was still based at Midway during the Attack on Pearl Harbor. On 8 December 1941, the Konishi Midway Neutralization Force consisting of two Japanese destroyers approached Midway and began shelling the airfield. The Force's assigned task was to screen for the retreating First Air Fleet after its attack on Pearl Harbor, and to destroy the patrol aircraft on Midway that might detect the Japanese fleet. One VP-21 Catalina was destroyed in its hangar and two others were damaged after hitting buoys during takeoffs without lights. Ensign John M. Eaton, Jr., was one of the ground officers of VP-21 who organized a crew of civilian workmen to remove the surviving Catalinas from the burning hangars and launch as many of them as possible while still under fire from the Japanese task force, he was later awarded the Navy Cross for his heroic actions during the attack. The squadron departed Midway for a return to Pearl Harbor on 13 December. Patrols and sector searches over the waters off Hawaii remained the order of the day until March 1942.
- 6 January 1942: A squadron aircraft claimed the sinking of an enemy submarine in the waters off Hawaii on this date, but postwar records show no Japanese submarine losses during that period.
- 2 March 1942: Replacement aircraft began arriving in significant numbers from the States. VP-21 was refitted with new PBY-5 seaplanes, equipped with the latest navigation and radio equipment.
- 28 March 1942: After a brief shakedown period for the new aircraft, VP-21 was transferred south to Australia in four divisions.
- 3 April 1942: After arriving at Adelaide, Australia, the squadron was split into two detachments: Detachment One operating from the bay at Crawley, and Detachment Two at Albany. The squadron was under the operational control of PatWing-10.
- 18 April 1942: The two detachments returned to Adelaide, and VP-21 was disestablished. The entire assets of the squadron—aircraft, aircrews, supplies and ground crews—were merged with the remains of VP-101.

== Aircraft assignments ==
The squadron was assigned the following aircraft, effective on the dates shown:

- NB-1 - 1929
- PD-1 - January 1930
- PM-1 - 1933
- P2Y-3 - 1935
- PBY1/2 - December 1937
- PBY-3 - April 1938
- PBY-4 - 1940
- PBY-5 - March 1942

== Home port assignments ==
The squadron was assigned to these home ports, effective on the dates shown:

- NAS San Diego, California - 7 January 1930
- NAS Pearl Harbor, Hawaii - 15 December 1940
- Adelaide, Australia - 3 April 1942

== See also ==
- Maritime patrol aircraft
- List of inactive United States Navy aircraft squadrons
- List of United States Navy aircraft squadrons
- List of squadrons in the Dictionary of American Naval Aviation Squadrons
- History of the United States Navy
