= VP5 (disambiguation) =

VP5 is a video compression format owned by Google and created by On2 Technologies.

VP5 may also refer to:

- VP-5, Patrol Squadron 5, a maritime patrol squadron of the United States Navy
- VP5, a viral protein; for example in Rotavirus
