= VP-131 =

United States Navy military unit (1943–1946)

Patrol Squadron 131
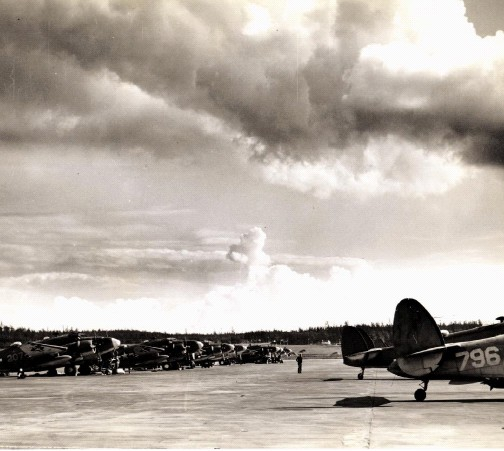
- VPB-131 PV-1s at NAS Whidbey Island c.1944
- Active: 8 March 1943 – 11 June 1946
- Country: United States of America
- Branch: United States Navy
- Type: squadron
- Role: Maritime patrol
- Engagements: World War II

Aircraft flown
- Patrol: PV-1; PV-2

VP-131 was a Patrol Squadron of the U.S. Navy. The squadron was established as Bombing Squadron 131 (VB-131) on 8 March 1943, redesignated Patrol Bombing Squadron 131 (VPB-131) on 1 October 1944, redesignated Patrol Squadron 131 (VP-131) on 15 May 1946 and disestablished on 11 June 1946.

== Operational history ==
- 8 March 1943: VB-131 was established at NAS DeLand, Florida as a medium bombing squadron flying the PV-1 Ventura. Most of the pilots were from PBY Catalina and OS2U Kingfisher inshore patrol squadrons and were unfamiliar with the Ventura. During the training phase at NAS Deland, the squadron came under the operational control of FAW-12. The primary mission and training for the squadron was Anti-submarine warfare (ASW).
- 31 May 1943: The squadron was transferred to NAAF Boca Chica, Florida for intensive ASW training in preparation for operational deployment, even though it had still received only four of its aircraft out of an assigned complement of 12.
- 21 June 1943: Lieutenant (jg) Arthur A. Steinmetz and crew were reported overdue from a routine bombing practice hop west of Key West. Subsequent searches over a three-day period found no trace of crew or aircraft. Approximately one year later the wreckage of the aircraft was found in shallow water 10 miles (16 km) off Boca Chica Key.
- 28 Jun 1943: VB-131 was transferred to NAS Guantanamo Bay, Cuba, under the operational control of FAW-11. Two days later a detachment of aircraft was sent to NS San Juan, Puerto Rico for a two-week period. The same detachment was sent on 12 July to Camagüey Air Base, Cuba, remaining until 4 September. With a primary mission of ASW, the squadron aircraft carried full wing and cabin tanks, full drop tanks and six 325-pound depth charges. During the entire deployment only one submarine was sighted, which submerged quickly before coming into effective attack range.
- 10 July 1943: Lieutenant (jg) Jack O. Lund and crew reported an engine failure during a routine patrol south of Guantanamo. When no further contact was made, search aircraft and a blimp were dispatched. The blimp found an oil slick and aircraft wreckage in the vicinity of Navassa Island, no survivors were sighted.
- 10 September 1943: VB-131 detached from NAS Guantanamo Bay to NS San Juan, for three weeks of ASW training using radar for night operations. Upon completion of training on 1 October, the squadron flew to Zandery Field, Dutch Guiana, for ASW and convoy patrol duty. The field was shared with an Army detachment flying B-25s armed with 75mm cannon in the nose. Since these aircraft had no radar, they flew only in daylight. The VPB-131 crews took the night shift. On 21 October, a detachment of three aircraft was sent to Atkinson Field, British Guiana, for temporary duty. The detachment did not return to the squadron at Zandery Field until 8 March 1944.
- 23 October 1943: Lieutenant (jg) Byron C. Kern and crew experienced instrument failure during a night mission and flew into the sea. One crewman was lost when the aircraft sank, but the rest were able to get into a life raft and were rescued the next day.
- 9 November 1943: Lieutenant John W. Powers returned from investigating a possible submarine contact at night to find Atkinson Field closed with rain and fog. Lacking sufficient fuel to proceed to another airstrip, Powers ditched the aircraft in a river near Paramaribo. While waiting in the water for eventual rescue, the crew observed one of the search planes flown by Lieutenant (jg) Robert G. Winthers crash practically on top of the site where they had just ditched their own aircraft. Winthers and his crew of five were killed in the crash. Lieutenant Powers and his crew were rescued the following day.
- 5 January 1944: Lieutenant (jg) Byron C. Kern and his crew of five crashed on takeoff, resulting in the loss of all hands.
- 17 February 1944: Lieutenant Malcolm E. Nafe was making a test hop in an aircraft that had been experiencing maintenance difficulties. On board as crew were maintenance personnel from the HEDRON along for the test flight. The pilot radioed that he had a fire, then the aircraft went out of control and crashed into the jungle near the base with a loss of all hands.
- 11 March 1944: VB-131 returned to NAS Norfolk, Virginia, under the operational control of FAW-5. After home leave, the squadron departed NAS Norfolk on 28 March for NAS Whidbey Island, Washington, arriving on 6 April 1944.
- 14 April – June 1944: The squadron commenced training at NAS Whidbey Island under the operational control of FAW-6. Equipment on the aircraft was upgraded to include new radar, new navigational gear and improved radios. New weapons were also installed at this time, including a chin gun package consisting of three guns, increasing the PV's forward firing 50-caliber guns from two to five. Six of the aircraft were also fitted with rocket launchers. Training concentrated on radar bombing through overcast, masthead bombing and section tactics. The first phase of training was completed on 1 May 1944, and all hands were given 30 days rehabilitation leave. The training syllabus was resumed on 4 June.
- 8 October 1944: VPB-131 departed NAS Whidbey Island for NAS Attu, Alaska, under the operational control of FAW-4, as the relief squadron for VPB-135. The squadron arrived at Attu on the 17th and began antishipping searches, fighter decoy and task force coverage throughout the Kurile Islands. These missions were continued through the end of December, with most of the attacks being made using only the five bow guns. Despite the emphasis in training on masthead bombing attacks, none of the squadron aircraft ever carried a bomb.
- 4 November 1944: Lieutenant Robert A. Ellingboe and five crewmen were reported missing in action during a daylight attack on Toroshimo Retto, the squadron's first combat mission. Eight VPB-131 Venturas were serving as fighter escort for the Army 28th Bombardment Group's B-24 Liberators when attacked by ten enemy fighters. Lieutenant Ellingboe's Ventura was hit and crashed in flames into the sea.
- November – December 1944: In mid-November VPB-43, a waterbased PBY squadron, was transferred from Attu and replaced by VPB-131 and 136, both flying land-based aircraft. During a patrol in late November one of the VPB-131 aircraft spotted what appeared to be a weather balloon. Upon reporting the sighting to base, the pilot was ordered to destroy the balloon. When fired upon, the device detonated with an enormous explosion. It was the first contact with the new Japanese balloon-bomb intended to create fires in North America.
- 5 January 1945: VPB-131 ceased combat operation briefly when the remainder of the squadron aircraft were fitted with rocket hard points and the pilots were given a period of training on rocket firing techniques by six of the squadron pilots who had received the training at NAS Pasco, Washington. The western tip of Agattu Island, Aleutians chain, was used as a firing range for the new HVAR rockets. The squadron found that cold weather decreased the effective range from 1,000-foot (300 m).
- 24 January 1945: The squadron conducted its first rocket attacks against enemy positions at Kokutan Zaki, Shimushu, Kuriles. Further attacks were conducted against military targets and fisheries at Kurabu Zaki, Paramushir; Kokutan Zaki and Minami Zaki, Shimushu; Masugawa, Paramushir; Hayake Gawa, Paramushir; and Torishima Retto, Paramushiro, through the end March 1945. From April through July, the combat activity decreased and missions were assigned that usually involved only daily searches from Attu for enemy presence.
- 20 February 1945: Lieutenant Powers received damage to his port engine from debris thrown up by his own rockets after an attack on Minami Zaki, Shimushu. He was unable to land at the Russian airfield at Petropavlosk, which was closed due to weather, and instead headed for Cape Lopatka. The crew bailed out over the Russian installation there and all hands were recovered without injury. The crew was transported across Siberia by train and truck, and eventually returned to the United States via Europe.
- 7 April 1945: Lieutenant (jg) Patton and his entire crew were killed when their aircraft crashed into Casco Cove. He had been attempting to make a landing against wind gusts of up to 60 knots when his Ventura stalled while making a 180-degree turn on his approach leg to the airstrip.
- 2 August 1945: VPB-131 departed Attu after being relieved by VPB-120, arriving at NAS Whidbey Island on 6 August 1945. Personnel were given home leave for two weeks before reforming the squadron.
- 18 September 1945: VPB-131 was reformed at NAS Whidbey Island, with 12 new PV-2 Harpoon aircraft. Flight operations were begun on 16 October with an entirely new complement of personnel and equipment. Most of the flight crews came intact from VPB-199, requiring little training time. Personnel assigned to the squadron included those who had extended or were regular Navy, and those who were expected to remain with the squadron. As a result, VPB-131 was not affected by the general demobilization.
- 1–30 December 1945: FAW-6 was disestablished and the commands under it were absorbed by FAW-4, including VPB-131. On the 20th, the squadron's complement of aircraft was reduced to nine PV-2s, with no spares. On 30 December, eight PV-2s were ferried from NAS Whidbey Island to NAAS Edenton, North Carolina.
- 26 April 1946: VP-131 was reduced to token operational status, all personnel were transferred and all records were turned over to the HEDRON.
- 11 June 1946: VP-131 was disestablished at NAS Whidbey Island.

== Aircraft assignments ==
The squadron was assigned the following aircraft, effective on the dates shown:

- PV-1 – March 1943
- PV-2 – September 1945

== Home port assignments ==
The squadron was assigned to these home ports, effective on the dates shown:

- NAS DeLand, Florida – 8 March 1943
- NAAF Boca Chica, Florida – 31 May 1943
- NAS Guantanamo Bay, Cuba – 28 June 1943
- NS San Juan, Puerto Rico – 10 September 1943
- Zandery Field, Dutch Guiana – October 1943
- NAS Norfolk, Virginia – 11 March 1944
- NAS Whidbey Island, Washington – 6 April 1944

== See also ==
- Maritime patrol aircraft
- List of inactive United States Navy aircraft squadrons
- List of United States Navy aircraft squadrons
- List of squadrons in the Dictionary of American Naval Aviation Squadrons
- History of the United States Navy
