= VP-3 =

Patrol Squadron 3
- Active: 2 January 1937 – 1 November 1955
- Country: United States of America
- Branch: United States Navy
- Type: squadron
- Role: Maritime patrol
- Engagements: World War II

Aircraft flown
- Patrol: PM-1; PBY-3/5/5A; PV-1; PV-2; P2V-1/2/3/3W/5

VP-3 was a Patrol Squadron of the U.S. Navy. The squadron was established as Patrol Squadron 16-F (VP-16F) on 2 January 1937, redesignated Patrol Squadron 16 (VP-16) on 1 October 1937, redesignated Patrol Squadron 41 (VP-41) on 1 July 1939, redesignated Bombing Squadron 136 (VB-136) on 1 March 1943, redesignated Patrol Bombing Squadron 136 (VPB-136) on 1 October 1944, redesignated Patrol Squadron 136 (VP-136) on 15 May 1946, redesignated Medium Patrol Squadron (landplane) 3 (VP-ML-3) on 15 November 1946, redesignated Patrol Squadron 3 (VP-3) on 1 September 1948, and was disestablished on 1 November 1955. It was the second squadron to be designated VP-3, the first VP-3 was redesignated VP-32 on 1 July 1939.

== Operational history ==
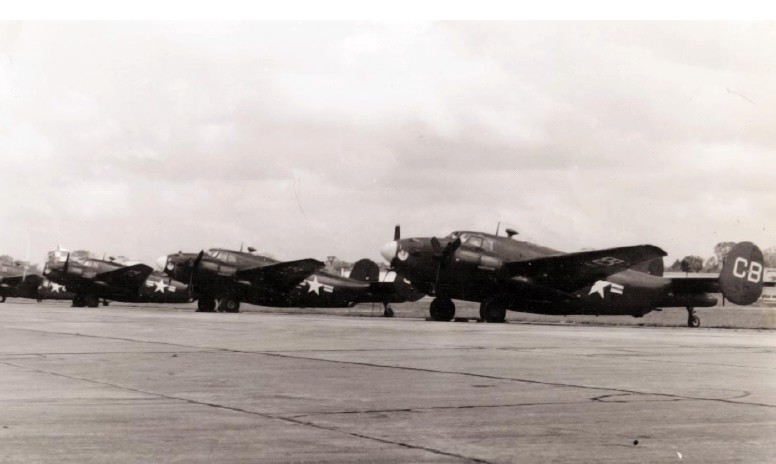
VP-136 PV-2s at Naval Air Station Whidbey Island c.1947

- 2 January 1937: VP-16F was established at NAS Seattle, Washington, as a patrol squadron composed of 12 PM-1 flying boats. USS Thrush provided tender support.
- 1 October 1937: VP-16F was redesignated VP-16 when all patrol squadrons were reassigned to Patrol Wings. VP-16 came under the air wing organization of PatWing-4.
- 17 March 1938: VP-16 and patrol squadrons 7, 9, 11, 12, 17 and 19 participated in Fleet Problem XIX (Phase II) as part of White Force, operating against Black Force at a distance of 600 miles (970 km). The patrol squadrons of White Force successfully attacked and damaged major elements of Black Force. The exercise was notable in that it was the first use of long-distance radio bearings for aircraft navigation in fleet operations.
- 8 Jul 1941: VP-41 began ferry flights to Naval Air Station San Diego, California, to turn in PBY-3s for new PBY-5 flying boats. Upon reequipping, VP-41 flew the new aircraft to NAS Kodiak, Alaska, to relieve VP-42, returning to Seattle in early September 1941.
- 7 December 1941: VP-41 returned to NAS Kodiak in a combat status, conducting the maximum number of patrols possible at extreme ranges. The squadron was relieved of patrol duties in Alaska by VP-42 on 5 February 1941.
- 7 February 1942: Upon returning from Alaska, VP-41 turned in its PBY-5s and was refitted with new PBY- 5A amphibious aircraft. War patrols were commenced from Naval Air Station Tongue Point, Washington, providing escort coverage for convoys.
- 26 May 1942: VP-41 returned to NAF Dutch Harbor, Alaska, in preparation for the anticipated attacks by Japanese naval forces. VP-42 arrived at the same time and was based at NAF Cold Bay, Alaska. Aircraft of both squadrons were dispersed to fjords and operated from the tender USS Casco to prevent the reoccurrence of an entire squadron being destroyed due to surprise enemy attacks as occurred during the Attack on Pearl Harbor.
- 2–3 June 1942: Two VP-41 Catalinas spotted the enemy task force 210 miles (340 km) from Dutch Harbor. Both aircraft were shot down with the loss of both crews, except for one crewman taken prisoner. On the next day Japanese carrier aircraft were launched from the Japanese carriers Ryūjō and Jun'yō to conduct the first of a series of attacks against Dutch Harbor. During one such raid on the 3rd, two Japanese fighters caught Ensign James T. Hildebrand, Jr., circling over the harbor. He managed to evade their fire and his crew succeeded in shooting down one of the aircraft.
- 5 Jun 1942: Lieutenant William N. Thies spotted a crashed Mitsubishi A6M Zero fighter while flying his Catalina low over the tundra of Akutan Island, Alaska, near Naval Air Facility Dutch Harbor. The pilot of the fighter had engine problems and attempted to land on what he had assumed was a grass field, not realizing that it was actually a swamp. The Zero had nosed over immediately upon landing, breaking the pilot's neck. It had lain there undiscovered for several days until Thies and his crew spotted it. Thies later led a recovery party to the site to retrieve the aircraft. The Zero was disassembled and then sent under great secrecy to Naval Air Station San Diego where it was reassembled and test flown. It was the first example of Japan's foremost fighter to fall into Allied hands.
- 6–13 June 1942: Japanese forces landed 1,250 men on the island of Kiska, in the Aleutians, on the 6th. On the 7th a second force began occupying Attu Island, also in the Aleutian island chain. Lieutenant Litsey of VP-41 was the first to spot the enemy troops on Kiska and the Japanese task force assembled in the bay. On 11 June 1942, Commander Patrol Wing 4 received a message from Commander in Chief Pacific which said, "bomb the enemy out of Kiska." Following unsuccessful missions by United States Army Air Forces B-17s and B-24s, aircraft available from VPs 41, 42, 43 and 51 commenced continuous bombing missions against targets in Kiska harbor from 11 to 13 June. These missions became known as the "Kiska Blitz." During these bombing strikes the aircraft were serviced by USS Gillis at Nazan Bay, Atka Island. Efforts to use the PBYs as horizontal bombers dropping their bombs from above the clouds proved futile. Pilots began attacking singly, approaching from a direction that provided the best cloud cover. When they were over the harbor the Catalinas were put into a dive and bombs released at appropriate time. The flak was intense. A pullout was initiated at between 500 and 1,500 feet, and the plane immediately again sought cover in the clouds. The raids continued until Gillis ran out of bombs and fuel. During the "Blitz" Lieutenant William N. Thies was awarded the Navy Cross for attacking enemy shipping, scoring a confirmed hit on a large enemy transport. Ensign James T. Hildebrand, Jr., was also awarded the Navy Cross for his participation in all-night aerial patrols and bombing attacks on enemy ships in Kiska harbor.
- 1 July 1942: The various squadrons detachment rejoined the rest of VP-41 at Dutch Harbor. The squadron returned to Seattle on 22 August 1942.
- 23 February 1943: VP-41 reformed at Naval Air Station Whidbey Island, Washington.
- 1 March 1943: VP-41 was redesignated VB-136 to reflect its change from a patrol squadron to a bombing squadron. By May the PBY-5A flying boats had been turned in, and the squadron began refitting with the PV-1 Ventura.
- 23 April 1943: The squadron deployed again to Naval Air Facility Adak, Alaska, and conducted searches from Umnak to Adak, with numerous missions to Japanese-held Kiska. Anti-submarine warfare (ASW) patrols were conducted in support of the pending invasion of Kiska, but results were negative.
- 8 May 1943: The pace of operations changed from search vectors and patrols to one of ground attack and bombing of Japanese positions on Kiska.
- 13 August 1943: The squadron put forth an all out effort to attack the Japanese on Kiska in support of the Army landings being conducted. After the staunch resistance offered by the Japanese during the Battle of Attu three months earlier, the Army requested that the Navy surface and air forces thoroughly batter the enemy before the landings commence. After several days of intense naval gunfire and bombing, Admiral Kincaid, commander of the naval forces, gave General Buckner, commander of the Army landing forces, the assurance that the landing zones would be clear. Upon landing the Army found that the Japanese had conducted a withdrawal of all their personnel under cover of bad weather.
- 1 October 1943: With the withdrawal of the Japanese forces from the Aleutians, VB-136 was relocated to Attu and employed in long-range missions into the Japanese-held northern Kurile Islands. The squadron returned to NAF Adak for rest and refit on 10 October 1943.
- 16 November 1943: The squadron was again assigned to operate from Attu, and on this date Lieutenant H. K. Mantius and crew became the first FAW-4 plane to conduct an attack on Paramushir, one of the Japanese home islands. This mission marked the beginning of the "Empire Express," taking the offensive to the Japanese home islands.
- 13 December 1943: The squadron returned to its home base at NAS Whidbey Island and all personnel were given home leave for two weeks. Upon their return, the squadron was reformed and its PV-1s were refitted with upgraded instrumentation, including LORAN, and three 50-caliber nose guns.
- 7 June 1944: The squadron deployed for a tour in the Aleutians, operating from the island of Attu. Operational searches, tactical bombing, and photographic reconnaissance were conducted over the northern Kuriles.
- 17 September 1944: During a mission to Paramushir, the commanding officer of the squadron, Lieutenant Commander Charles Wayne, was forced down over Russian territory with battle damage. The Russians interned the entire crew. As a result of this mishap, further Empire Express missions were canceled. VB-136 missions were restricted to sector searches or special photo missions where the speed of the PV-1 was required.
- 6 November 1944: Eight PV-1s from the squadron were sent to obtain low oblique photographs of the Paramushir coastline. Four of the aircraft provided diversionary attacks on ground targets, while the remainder took the photos with large F-56 cameras. Two PBY-5As of VP-62 were on standby off the coast of Kamchatka for rescue operations if needed.
- 1 January 1945: VPB-136 was transferred to Attu, Alaska, for fitting of rocket rails and training in use of air-to-ground rockets.
- 1 February 1945: The squadron continued sector searches from Attu, Alaska, with two missions in support of Task Force 92.
- 12 March 1945: VPB-136 was relieved by VPB-139, and returned to its home base at NAS Whidbey Island.
- 10 May 1945: After all hands had returned from a 30-day home leave, the squadron was reformed at NAS Whidbey Island and a new training syllabus begun for the new crews. The new PV-2 Harpoon replaced the squadron's PV-1 Venturas.
- 1 September 1952: VP-3 and VP-34 were the only two patrol squadrons to complete FY 1952 with 100 percent safety marks.
- 1 October 1952: VP-3 hosted 18 officers and enlisted personnel from the Royal Australian Air Force and 21 personnel from the South African Air Force during familiarization training on the P2V-5 aircraft purchased for their countries’ naval air forces.
- 17 December 1953: A VP-3 P2V-5 Neptune, BuNo 124901, and its crew of nine crashed on the Mýrdalsjökull Glacier, Iceland. Rescue crews were able to extract only one body from the wreckage before storms sealed it in the ice. The wreckage was spotted again in October 1981, 500 yards from the glacier's edge. The bodies of the eight remaining crewmen were recovered from the ice by the Icelandic Lifesaving Association and returned to the United States.
- 1 November 1955: VP-3 was disestablished with all personnel and assets transferred to VAH-1.

== Aircraft assignments ==
The squadron was assigned the following aircraft, effective on the dates shown:

- PM-1 - January 1937
- PBY-3 - June 1938
- PBY-5 - July 1941
- PBY-5A - February 1942
- PV-1 - June 1943
- Lockheed Ventura#PV-2 Harpoon - May 1945
- P2V-1 - 1946
- P2V-2 - 1949
- P2V-3/3W - February 1950
- P2V-5 - January 1951

== Home port assignments ==
The squadron was assigned to these home ports, effective on the dates shown:

- Naval Air Station Seattle, Washington - 2 January 1937
- Naval Air Station Whidbey Island, Washington - 23 February 1943
- Naval Air Station Coco Solo, Panama Canal Zone - 15 November 1946
- Naval Air Station Jacksonville, Florida - 1 September 1948

== See also ==
- Maritime patrol aircraft
- List of inactive United States Navy aircraft squadrons
- List of United States Navy aircraft squadrons
- List of squadrons in the Dictionary of American Naval Aviation Squadrons
- History of the United States Navy
