= Boeing NB =

NB
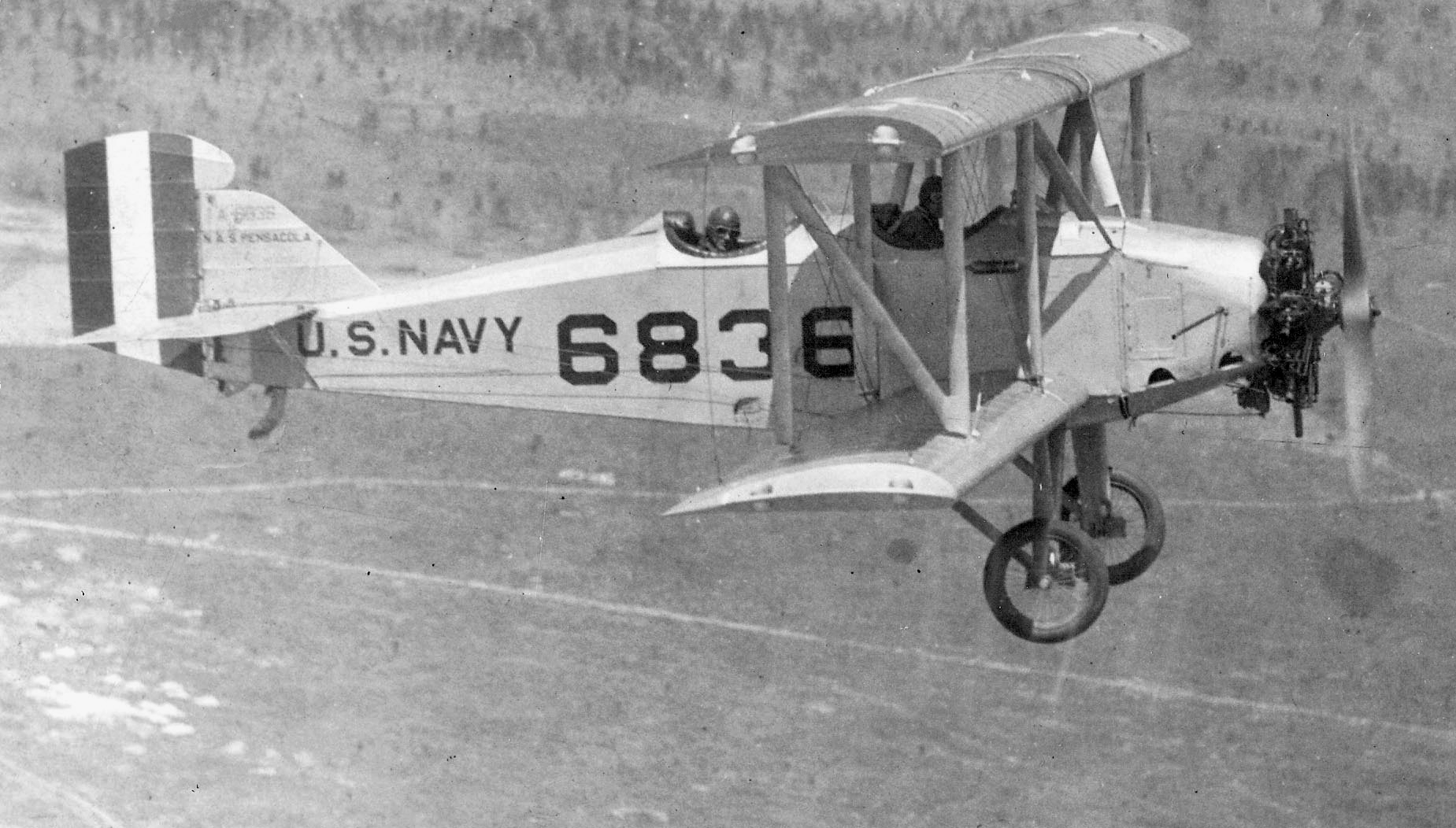
- Boeing NB-1

General information
- Type: Military trainer
- Manufacturer: Boeing
- Number built: ca. 72

History
- First flight: 20 October 1923

The Boeing NB (or Model 21) was a primary training aircraft developed for the United States Navy in 1923. It was a two-bay, equal-span biplane of conventional configuration with interchangeable wheeled and float undercarriage. The pilot and instructor sat in tandem, open cockpits.

The NBs were produced in two batches; the first (NB-1) were powered by radial engines and the second by war-surplus V-8s still in the Navy's inventory. The original prototype evaluated by the Navy had been assessed as being too easy to fly, and therefore of limited use as a trainer. In particular, it was noted that the aircraft was impossible to spin. The NB-1 design attempted to introduce some instability, but it was soon discovered that while it was now possible to get the aircraft into a spin, it was virtually impossible to recover from one. A series of modifications were made to attempt a compromise.

== Variants ==
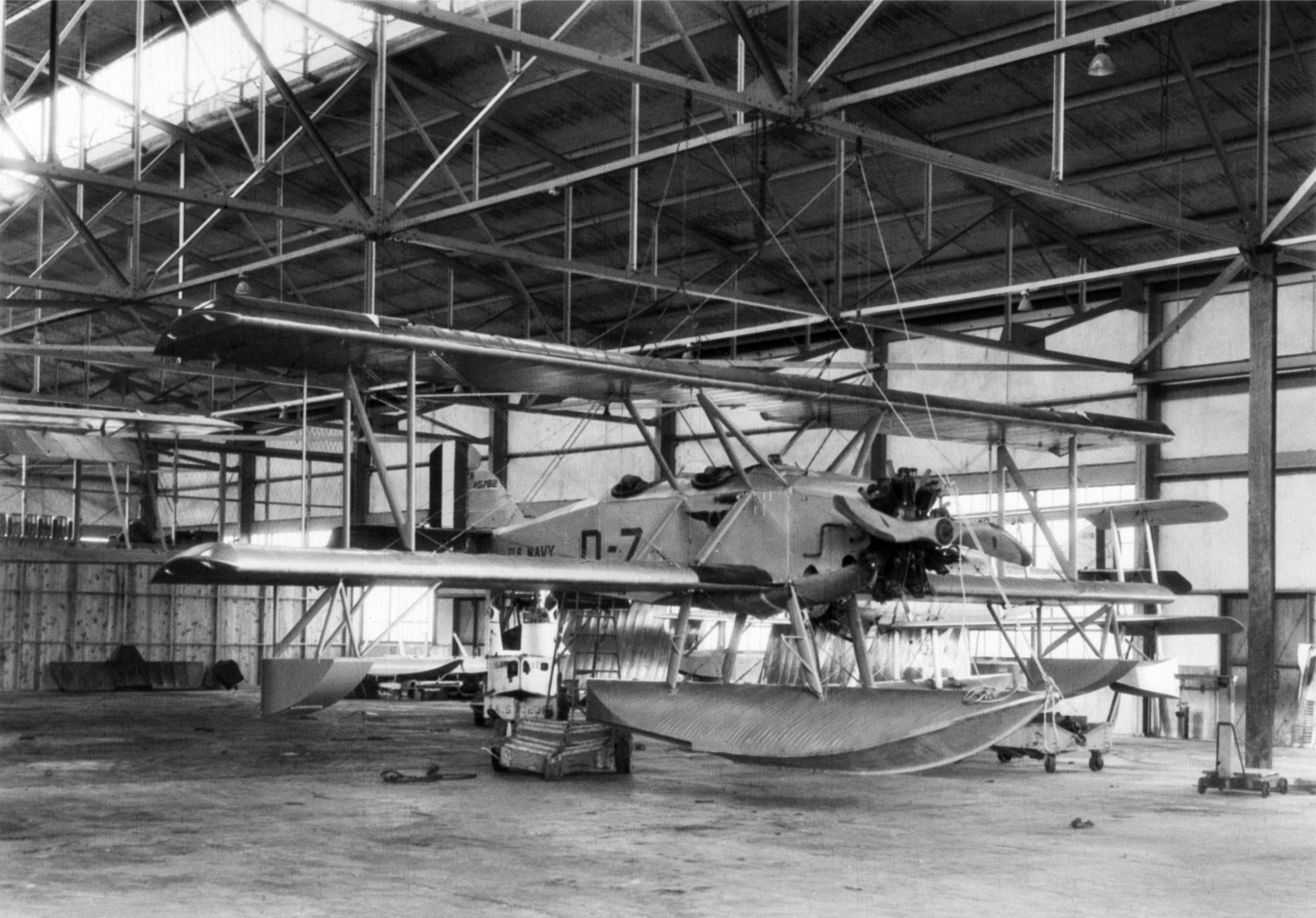
An NB-1 floatplane at the National Advisory Committee for Aeronautics, in 1926.

- VNB-1 - prototype (one built)
- NB-1 - original production machine with Lawrance J-1 radial engine (41 built)
- NB-2 - production machine with Wright-Hispano E engine (30 built)
- NB-3 - one NB-1 with lengthened fuselage and modified empennage to improve handling, and Hispano-Suiza E engine. Later refitted to standard NB-1
- NB-4 - one NB-1 converted similar to NB-3, but with Lawrance J-1 engine. Later refitted to standard NB-1

== Operators ==
United States

- United States Navy

Peru

- Peruvian Naval Aviation (NB-1)

== Specifications (NB-1) ==
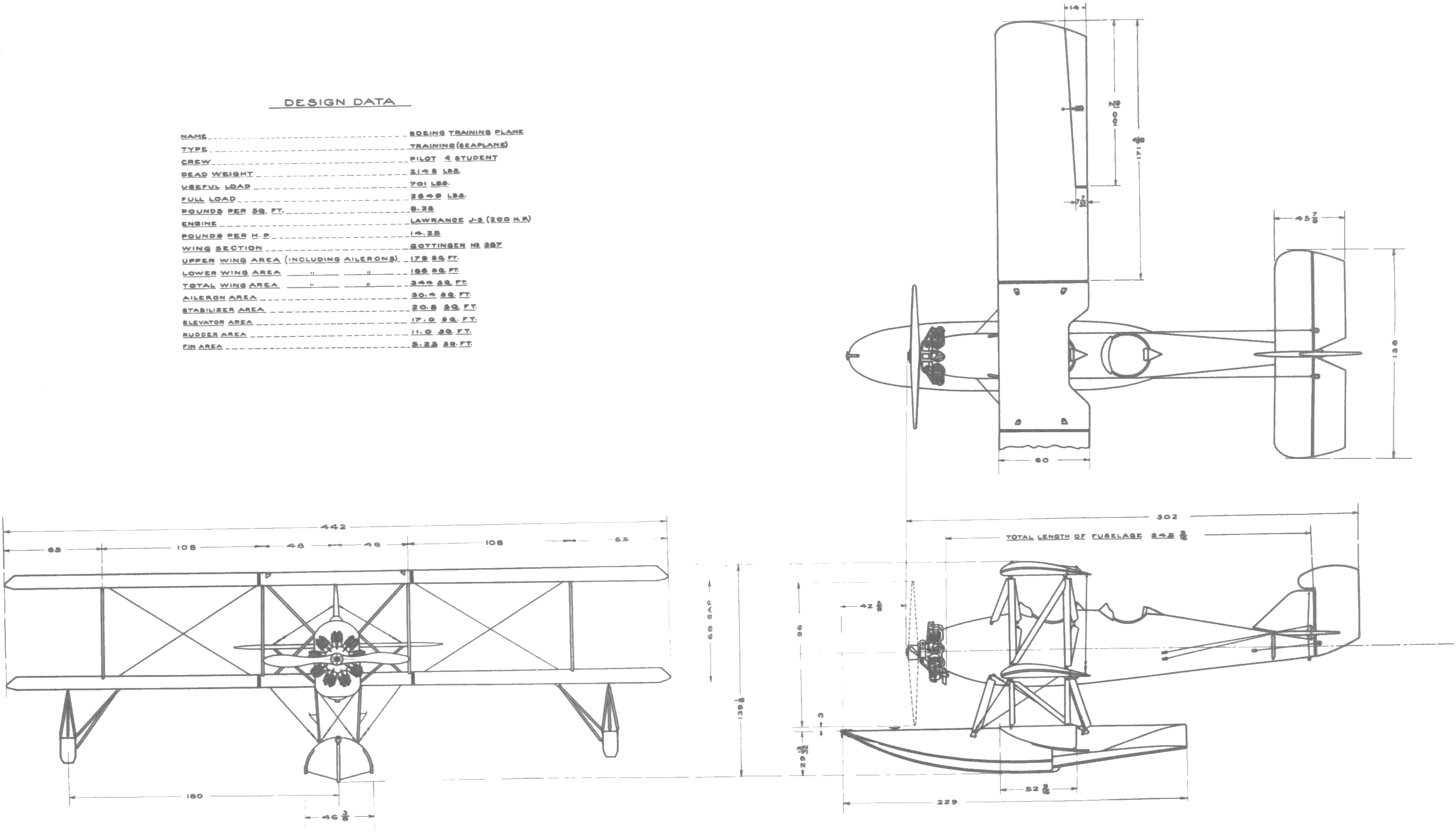
3-view line drawing of the Boeing NB

General characteristics

- Crew: two, pilot and instructor
- Length: 28 ft 9 in (8.76 m)
- Wingspan: 36 ft 10 in (11.23 m)
- Height: 11 ft 8 in (3.56 m)
- Wing area: 344 sq ft (32.0 m^{2})
- Empty weight: 2,136 lb (969 kg)
- Gross weight: 2,837 lb (1,287 kg)
- Powerplant: 1 × Lawrance J-1 , 200 hp (149 kW)

Performance

- Maximum speed: 100 mph (160 km/h, 87 kn)
- Range: 300 mi (480 km, 260 nmi)
- Service ceiling: 10.200 ft (3,110 m)
- Rate of climb: 510 ft/min (2.6 m/s)

Armament

- 1 × trainable rearward-firing .30 machine gun (optional, for gunnery training)
