= VP-5 =

United States Navy maritime patrol squadron

VP-5 Mad Foxes
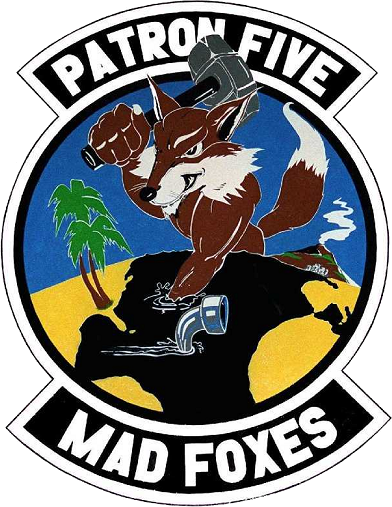
- VP-5 Unit Insignia
- Active: 2 January 1937 – present
- Country: United States
- Branch: United States Navy
- Type: Maritime patrol
- Role: Maritime Patrol; Anti-Submarine Warfare; Anti-Surface Warfare; Intelligence, Surveillance, and Reconnaissance; ELINT; SIGINT; Search and Rescue; Drug Interdiction; Ship Interdiction
- Part of: Commander, Patrol and Reconnaissance Wing Eleven
- Garrison/HQ: Naval Air Station Jacksonville
- Nicknames: Blue Foxes "Blind Foxes" (1943–1946); Mad Foxes (1948 – present)
- Patron: Five
- Motto: No Fox Like a Mad Fox.
- Colors: Royal Blue
- Equipment: Boeing P-8A Poseidon
- Engagements: World War II; Aleutian Islands Campaign; Vietnam War; Gulf War; Operation Desert Shield; Operation Desert Storm; Operation Deliberate Force; Operation Eagle Eye; Global war on terrorism; Operation Enduring Freedom; Operation Iraqi Freedom; Operation Active Endeavor; Libyan Civil War; Operation Odyssey Dawn; Operation Unified Protector
- Decorations: Joint Meritorious Unit Award (2); Navy Unit Commendation (4); Coast Guard Unit Commendation; Coast Guard Meritorious Unit; Meritorious Unit Commendation(6); Navy E Ribbon (8); Navy Expeditionary Medal; Armed Forces Expeditionary; Armed Forces Service Medal (2); Humanitarian Service Medal (4); Coast Guard Special Operations; SECNAV Commendation; CNO Commendation; Republic of Vietnam Citation; Retention Excellence Award (10); Arnold Jay Isbell Trophy (10); Golden Wrench

Commanders
- Commanding Officer: CDR Brett Eckert
- Executive Officer: CDR John Leeds
- Command Master Chief: CMDCM Thomas Curtin

Aircraft flown
- Patrol: PM-1; PBY-2/5/5A; PV-1; PV-2; P2V-1/3/5/SP-2E; P-3A/C; P-8A

Patrol Squadron FIVE (VP-5) is a long-lived maritime patrol squadron of the United States Navy. It is the second squadron to bear the VP-5 designation. VP-5 is the second oldest patrol squadron, the fourth oldest in the United States Navy, and the 33rd oldest squadron in the United States military. As of 2019, VP-5 is still active and is based at Naval Air Station Jacksonville, Florida.

== Lineage ==
The squadron was originally established as Patrol Squadron 17-F (VP-17F) on 2 January 1937, redesignated Patrol Squadron 17 (VP-17) on 1 October 1937, redesignated Patrol Squadron 42 (VP-42) on 1 July 1939, redesignated Bombing Squadron 135 (VB-135) on 15 February 1943, redesignated Patrol Bombing Squadron 135 (VPB-135) on 1 October 1944, redesignated Patrol Squadron 135 (VP-135) on 15 May 1946, redesignated Medium Patrol Squadron (Landplane) 5 (VP-ML-5) on 15 November 1946 and redesignated Patrol Squadron 5 (VP-5) on 1 September 1948. It was the second squadron to be designated VP-5, the first VP-5 was redesignated Patrol Squadron 33 (VP-33) on 1 July 1939.

== Operational history ==
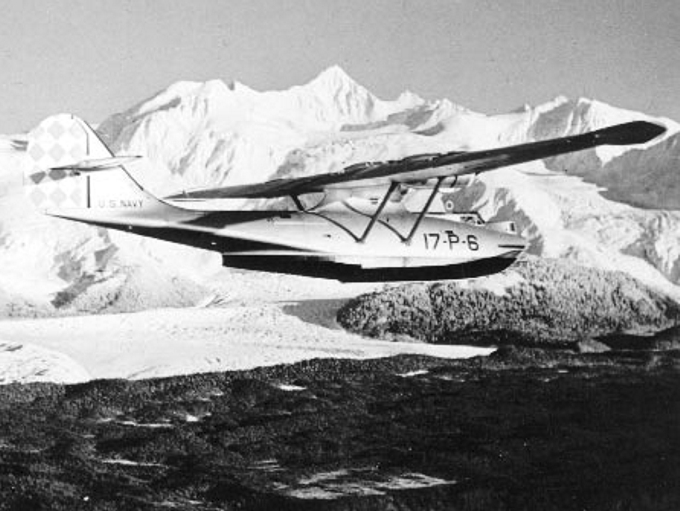
PBY-2 of VP-17 over Alaska circa 1939

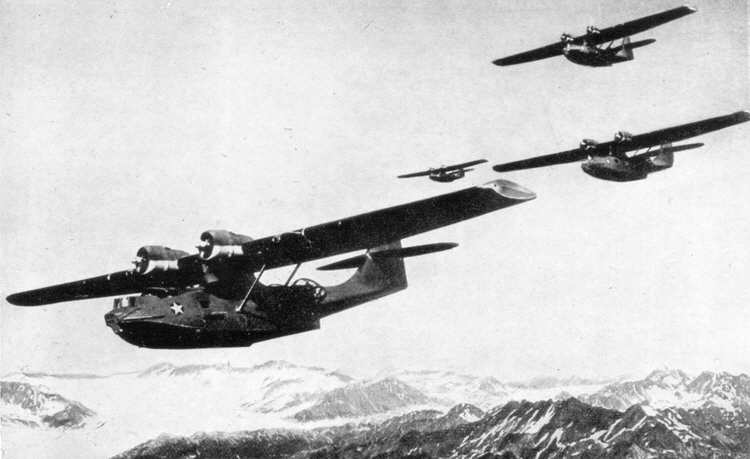
VP-42 PBY 2 Catalina Formation

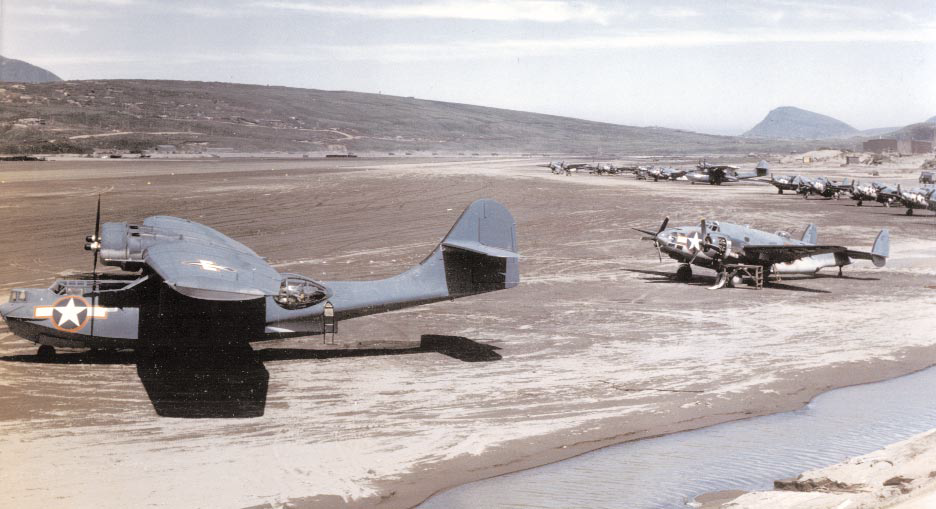
VB-135 PBY-5A and PV-1 transition in 1943

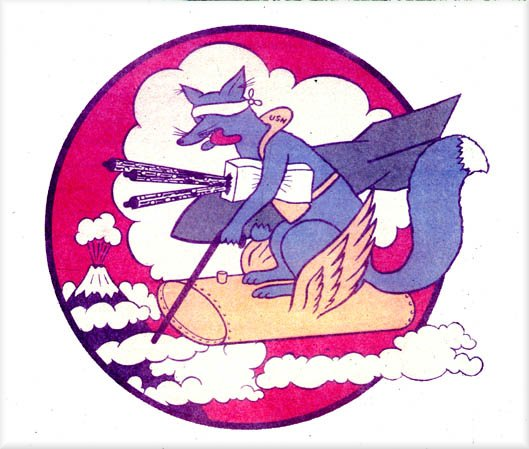
VB-135 "Blind Foxes"

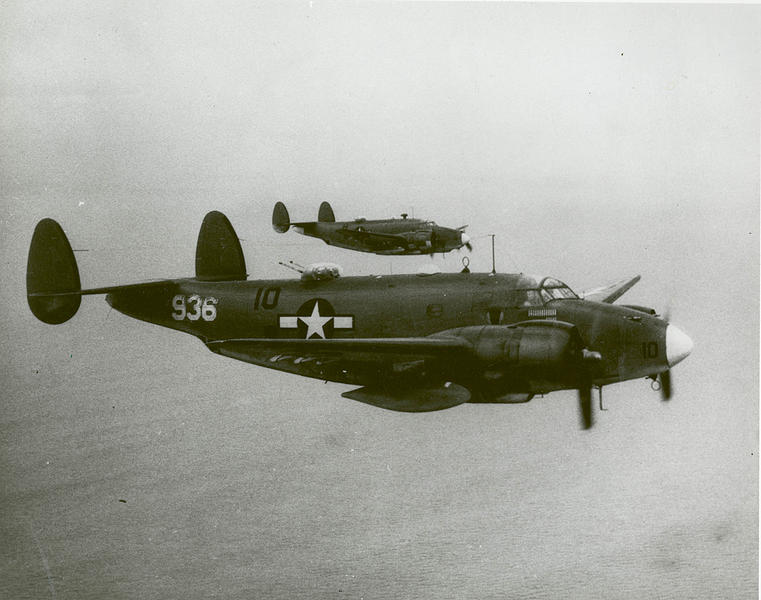
VB-135 PV-1 1944

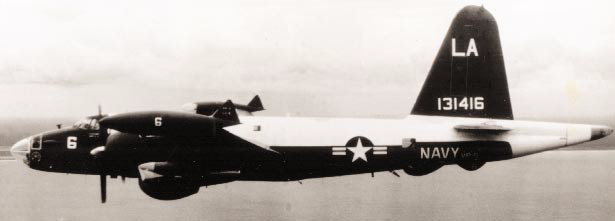
VP-5 P2V-5 Neptune 1962

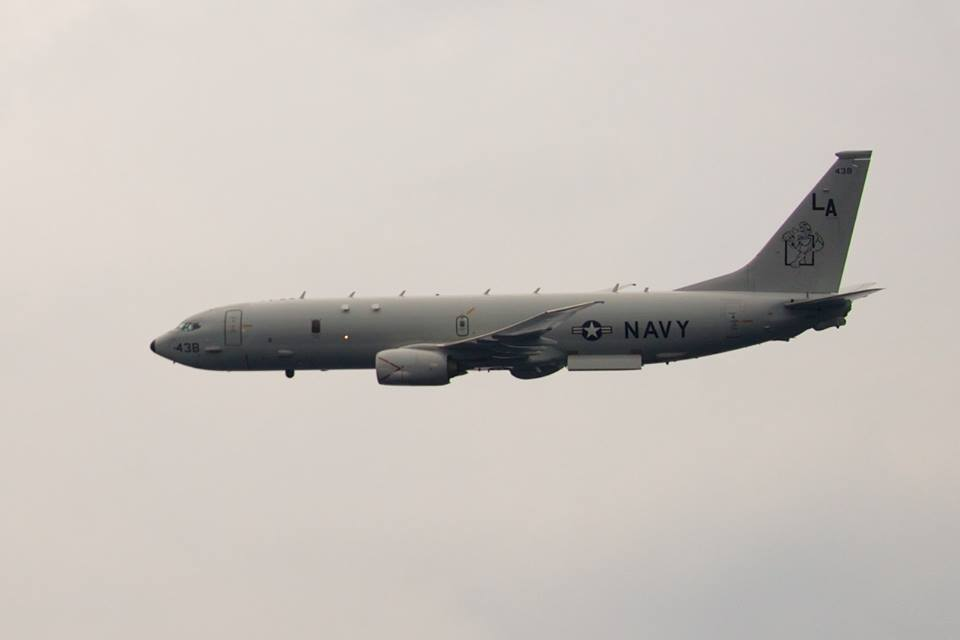
P-8A during a routine maritime patrol

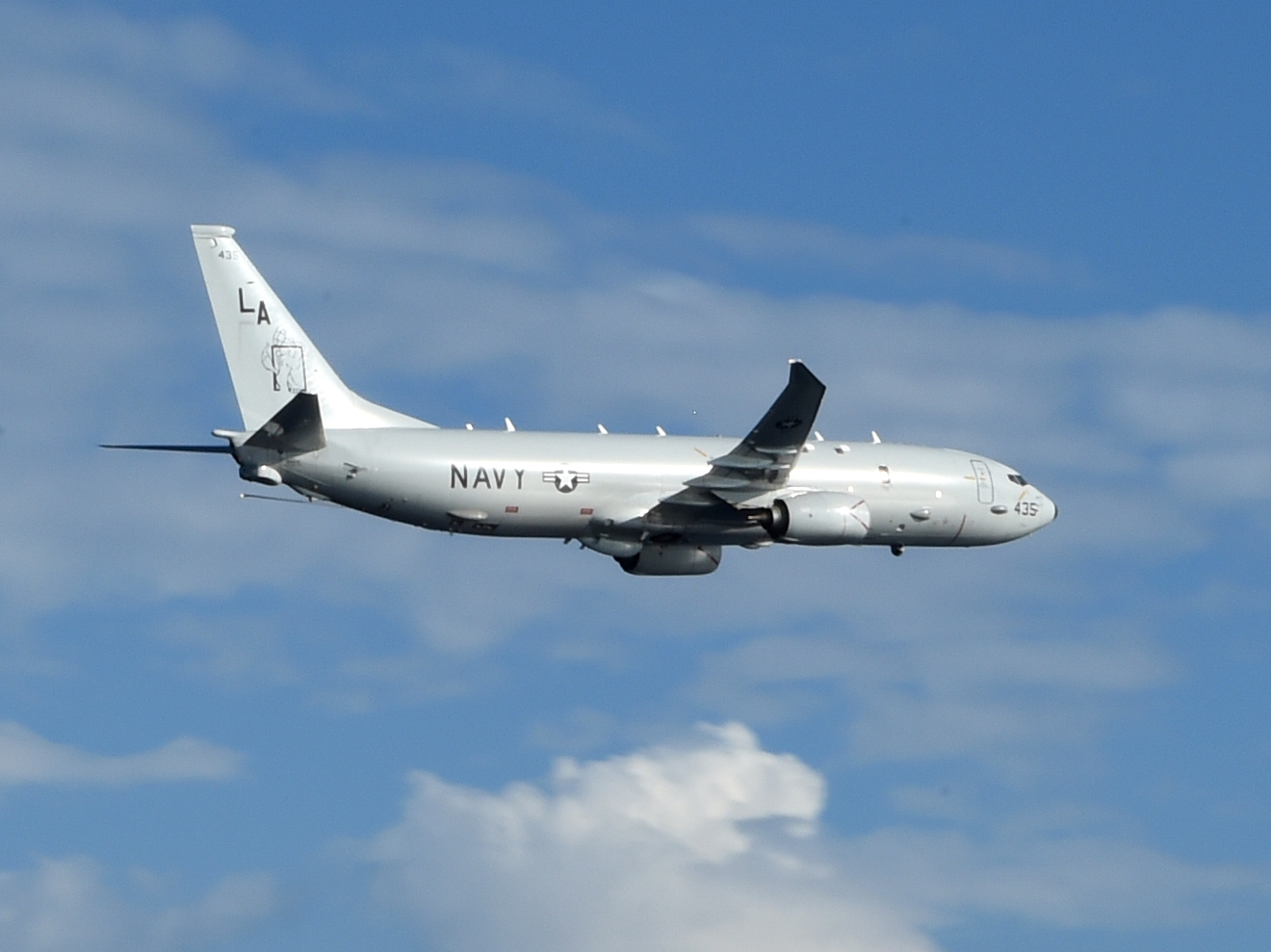
P-8A of VP-5 in September 2014

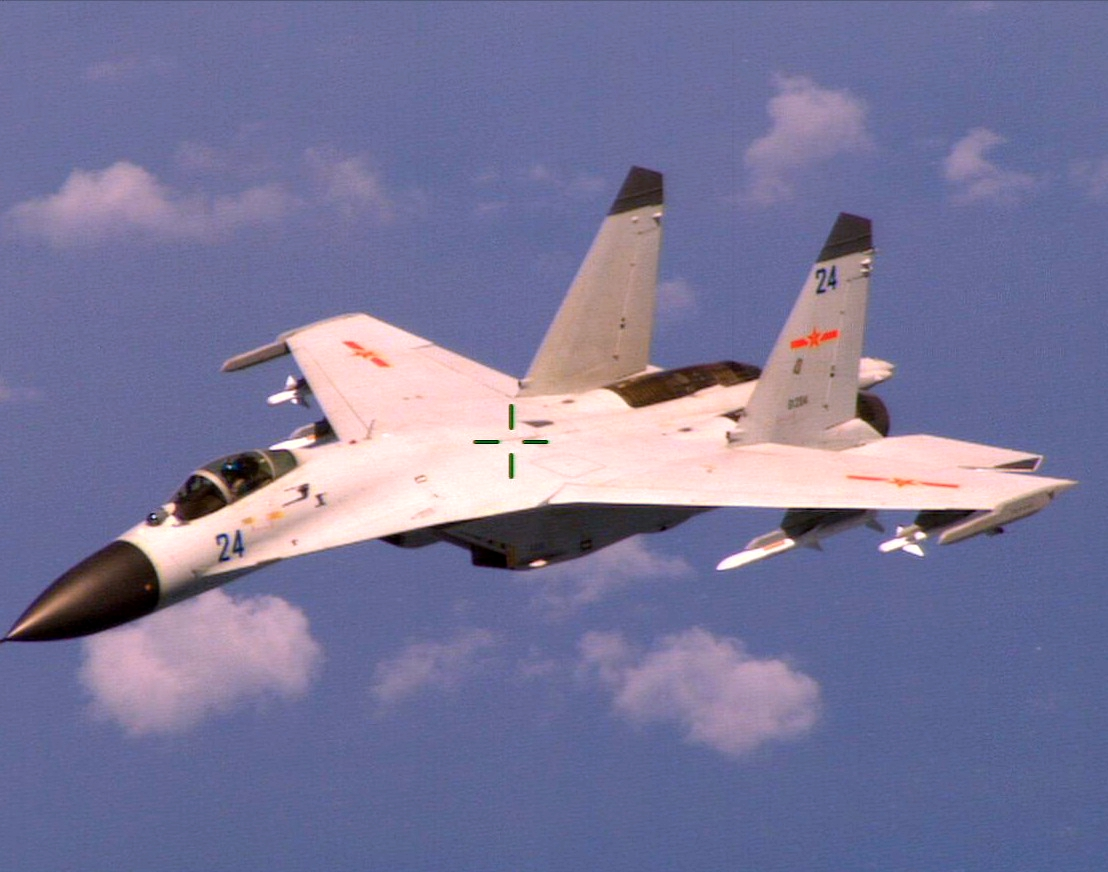
Chinese Shenyang J-11B Flanker intercepting a U.S. P-8A

=== 1937–1941 ===
VP-17F was established at FAB Seattle, Washington on 2 January 1937, under the administrative command of PatWing4, Base Force. The squadron's PM-1 seaplanes were tended by USS Thrush. On 1 October 1937 VP-17F was re-designated VP-17 when all patrol squadrons were removed from the Base Force and placed administratively under Patrol Wings. During March 1938 VP-17 turned in its PM-1s in March for the new PBY-2 Catalina seaplanes. Tender support for the squadron was supplied by USS Teal. The squadron participated in Fleet Problem XIX (Phase II) as part of White Force, along with aircraft of patrol squadrons 7, 9, 11, 12, 16 and 19. Missions included flights extending out to 600 miles (970 km) to locate and successfully attack elements of Black Force. The exercises marked the first use of long-distance radio bearings for aircraft. In November 1938 VP-17 was selected to test new electrically heated flying suits, in the first trials, the suits blew out fuses while at 18,700 feet (5,700 m). The general opinion was that the suits were too bulky and unreliable in the cramped confines of the aircraft. The manufacturer began to incorporate better heating and cabin insulation in later models of the PBY, greatly improving crew comfort on long flights. On 30 January 1941 the squadron began a refit with new aircraft, turning in the older PBY-2 models for PBY-5 aircraft fresh from the factory. On 15 July 1941 VP-42 was deployed to Sitka, Alaska, for advanced base operations and cold weather training. A detachment was maintained at Naval Air Station Kodiak, Alaska. On 2 September 1941, the Kodiak detachment was visited by two aircraft from a Russian seaplane squadron under the command of General Gromof.

=== World War II ===
On 7 December 1941 upon receiving word of the Attack on Pearl Harbor, all squadron aircraft were put on alert and prepared for a move to Naval Air Station Tongue Point. The movement of the squadron to the temporary location took place on 8 December 1941, and remained in effect until the next week. On 29 January 1942 VP-42 flew all of its PBY-5s to Naval Air Station San Diego, California, where they were turned in for new PBY-5A amphibious models. Squadron strength was increased to 12 aircraft.

On 1 February 1942 VP-42 relieved VP-41 of patrol duties at Naval Air Station Kodiak. Beginning 1 March 1942, aircraft were sent in elements of two to Naval Air Station Alameda, California, for installation of ASD-1 radar. From 3–15 June 1942 VP-42 participated in the first attack on Japanese vessels and positions while based at Naval Air Facility Dutch Harbor, in the Aleutian Islands. Lieutenant (junior grade) Lucius D. Campbell flew through a snow squall to make contact with a heavy enemy concentration south of Umnak Island. Despite severe damage from enemy aircraft, he remained in the area until he had determined the extent of the enemy forces and their location. On his return to Dutch Harbor his Catalina ran out of fuel and he was forced to make an open sea landing. They survived the forced landing and were rescued later in the day. On 11 June 1942, Commander Patrol Wing 4 received a message from Commander in Chief Pacific which said, "bomb the enemy out of Kiska." Following unsuccessful missions by United States Army Air Forces (USAAF) B-17s and B-24s, aircraft available from VPs 41, 42, 43 and 51 commenced continuous bombing missions against targets in Kiska harbor from 11 to 13 June. These missions became known as the "Kiska Blitz." During these bombing strikes the aircraft were serviced by USS Gillis at Nazan Bay, Atka Island. Efforts to use the PBYs as horizontal bombers dropping their bombs from above the clouds proved futile. Pilots began attacking singly, approaching from a direction that provided the best cloud cover. When they were over the harbor the Catalinas were put into a dive and bombs released at the appropriate time. The flak was intense. A pullout was initiated at between 500-foot (150 m) and 1,500-foot (460 m), and the plane immediately again sought cover in the clouds. The raids continued until USS Gillis ran out of bombs and fuel. Lieutenant (junior grade) Campbell was awarded the Navy Cross for his conduct during the campaign in Alaska. On 1 July 1942 VP-42 relocated to Cold Bay, Alaska, to provide support to the FAW4 Air Search Group. On 20 July 1942, the squadron moved again to Nazan Bay, Atka Island. Tender support was provided by USS Gillis. On 3 August 1942 the squadron returned to Seattle for two weeks of leave, returning to Naval Air Station Kodiak on 22 August 1942, for a continuance of combat operations. On 23 Aug 1942 VP-42 was called upon to provide cover for the occupation of Adak. On 31 August 1942 Lieutenant S. Coleman of VP-42 heavily damaged the Japanese submarine RO-61. The submarine was caught on the surface five miles north of Cape Shaw, Atka Island. RO-61 was located later on the same day by USS Reid and sunk. Several survivors were rescued from the frigid waters.

On 15 February 1943 while stationed at Umnak, Alaska, VP-42 was redesignated VB-135. On the same date orders were received returning the squadron to Seattle, for a refit at Naval Air Station Whidbey Island, Washington, with new PV-1 Ventura medium bombers, the first to operate in the Pacific and Aleutians area. The squadron began training on 24 February 1943 after a short leave for all hands, by 23 March VB-135 was en route to Naval Air Station Adak, Alaska, with its full complement of PV-1s, arriving on 12 April 1943. Until the end of May 1943, the primary duties of the squadron consisted of photoreconnaissance and high-speed patrols over enemy held islands. Most of the photo work was done with hand-held K-20 cameras, since the aircraft had not been fitted as photorecon models. On 5 May 1943 VB-135 made its first full-scale attack on Japanese positions on Kiska, using their ASD-1 radar to penetrate the cloud cover over the target area. The squadron was based during this period at Amchitka Air Force Base. By 10 August 1943 VB-135 had moved to the Naval Air Station Attu and was given the task of providing antiaircraft patrols 500 miles (800 km) west and south of the island operating from a partially completed air strip at Alexai Point. Severe crosswinds and tent quarters made living and flying from the island a nightmare.

From 5 November until February 1944 the squadron returned to Naval Air Station Whidbey Island for leave and reassignment of personnel. Only four aircraft were able to depart Attu, the rest being unserviceable. On 3 February 1944, the squadron was reformed with new squadron personnel and aircraft. Transition training commenced for aircrews, many of whom had never flown the PV-1 Ventura. On 19 April 1944 the squadron flew to Naval Air Station Adak, where special training began on the use of LORAN for long-distance navigation in the hostile environment of the far north. LORAN was a system of electronic navigation using fixed beacons that constantly transmitted repetitive signals. An aircraft could determine its relative position between the two beacons based on the strength and direction of the signals. Each beacon had an identifying signal prefix that matched its location on the map. The HEDRON installed the new LORAN gear in the aircraft during this period and on 4 May 1944 flew to Casco Field, Attu, to resume combat operations. On 10 May 1944: VB-135 conducted night photo reconnaissance over the Japanese-held islands of Paramushir and Shimushu in the Kurile Islands. Photo flash bombs were used to light the target areas. The missions soon became known as the "Empire Express" runs, since they were the first to encroach on the Japanese home islands. This time the aircraft had been fitted with bow-mounted Fairchild K19-A cameras. On 14 June 1944 VB-135 aircraft conducted daylight photoreconnaissance over Paramushir and Shimushu, resulting in the loss of two aircraft damaged and forced to land in Russian territory. The crews were interned by the Soviets for several months. On 23 July 1944: Lieutenant Vivian attacked and sank a Japanese picket boat, but his aircraft was badly damaged by anti-aircraft fire. He and his crew were forced to land in Russian territory to face an internment of several months. On 23 October 1944 VPB-135 transferred back to Naval Air Station Whidbey Island for reforming and training of new crews. Instrument training was conducted at Naval Air Station Whidbey Island from February–June 1945.

On 1 June 1945 VPB-135 transferred to Naval Auxiliary Air Field Mount Vernon, Washington, for transition training in the new PV-2 Harpoon. The squadron eventually received 15 of the aircraft. Repairs to the wing spars of the new planes at the Burbank factory from 23 to 30 June delayed the squadron's return to combat for its third tour. On 4 August 1945 the squadron returned to Naval Air Station Attu for another combat tour. Indoctrination training on local weather conditions was given to all new crews through 18 August 1945, when the first sector searches were initiated.

The squadron was nicknamed the "Blind Fox" squadron reflecting the squadron's method of flying "blind" through heavy weather, the squadron altered the patch to depict a fox riding a flying gas tank. In this classic patch, the blindfolded fox carried a bomb underneath one arm and with the opposite hand held a cane to assist in navigating through the clouds.

=== 1940s–1950s ===
On 20 November 1945 VPB-135 aircraft and crews arrived at Naval Air Station Edenton, North Carolina, for reforming of the squadron. On 30 November 1946 VPB-135 was chosen to represent the U. S. Navy patrol squadron community during presidential inauguration ceremonies in Mexico City. In June 1948 VP-ML-5 received the first P2V Neptune, equipped with magnetic anomaly detection (MAD) equipment capable of detecting large magnetic objects underwater. The technology to detect submerged submarines through non-acoustic means facilitated a major capability leap in anti-submarine warfare (ASW) and manifested itself not only in squadron operations but also in the evolution of the squadron name and patch. Designated as VP-5 in December 1948, the squadron became known as the "Mad Foxes" and changed the patch to depict a fox casually preparing to strike a submarine with a sledgehammer.

In June 1958 the squadron deployed to Naval Air Station Argentia, Newfoundland. "Ice reccos" and shipping patrols were flown without incident. "Ice reccos" were patrols over shipping lanes on the lookout for icebergs that might endanger surface vessels in the area. In July, half of the squadron deployed to Naval Station Rota, Spain, to become the first patrol squadron based there. In April 1959 VP-5 deployed to Naval Air Station Keflavik, Iceland. Two other squadrons were stationed there during this period, participating in exercises with the fleet. A Soviet submarine was tracked for 24 hours at one point in the exercise, but finally surfaced and proceeded on its way after failing to shake the trackers.

In 1955, at NAS Jacksonville, on the P2V-5, a jet engine was installed outboard of the piston- engine in order to increase the speed during ASW operations.

=== 1960s ===
In July 1960 the squadron was scheduled for a five-month deployment to NS Rota, Spain, for duties with the Sixth Fleet, but in September the deployment was rescheduled. VP-5 became the first full squadron to be deployed to Naval Air Station Sigonella, Sicily, after the base became operational. From April to May 1961 VP-5 participated in exercises in the Caribbean as well as aiding in the recovery of America's first astronaut, Commander Alan Shepard, on 5 May 1961. In July 1961 as part of the Project Mercury recovery team, VP-5 aided in the recovery of Captain Gus Grissom, US Air Force. On 1 September 1962 the squadron participated in the recovery of Commander Wally Schirra.

On 12 January 1962, squadron Executive Officer Commander Norbert Kozak launched in LA-9 from Naval Air Station Keflavik for an ice patrol mission along the Greenland coast, in an apparent controlled flight into terrain, the aircraft crashed into the upslope of the Kronborg Glacier near the Denmark Strait, killing all twelve men aboard. The crash site was not discovered until 1966 when four geologists found it and while some remains were recovered in September 1966, it was not until 2004 that the Navy recovered all the crew remains and memorialized the crew at the crash site.

In October 1962 the squadron under command of Commander Robert P. Smyth was one of the first called up for the Cuban Quarantine during the Cuban Missile Crisis. VP-5 staged patrols from Naval Air Station Jacksonville, Florida; Roosevelt Roads Naval Station, Puerto Rico; and Naval Air Station Guantanamo Bay, Cuba. It was the first squadron to spot and photograph a Soviet ship, Bucharest, carrying missiles, and later the first to locate and track the first Soviet ship departing Cuba with dismantled missiles aboard.

On 1 July 1966 VP-5 received its first three P-3A Orions. The squadron was the last fleet operational unit to fly the SP-2E. On 1 June 1967 VP-5 deployed to WestPac with the majority of the squadron based at Naval Station Sangley Point, Philippines. Duties consisted of Yankee Station patrols, anti-infiltration surveillance, and open ocean shipping surveillance flights. Yankee Station patrols provided night radar coverage of the Gulf of Tonkin as one measure in the defense of the fleet's strike carriers from attack by high-speed surface craft.

On 23 May 1968 VP-5 deployed to NS Rota, Spain, supported by USS Tallahatchie County off Souda Bay, Crete. The use of a support vessel for land-based aircraft at an advanced base site was an experimental concept. The detachment at Crete proved that the idea had merit, but there were no subsequent deployments with support supplied solely by tenders.

=== 1970s–1980s ===
On 7 December 1979 VP-5 deployed to Naval Air Station Bermuda with squadron detachments sent at different times to Naval Air Station Keflavik, Iceland; Lajes Field, Azores; Dakar, Africa; and Roosevelt Roads, Puerto Rico. From January–March the squadron flew in relief supplies to earthquake victims in the Azores. In May 1982 VP-5 deployed to Naval Air Station Sigonella, the squadron's anti–submarine warfare activities during the deployment earned it a Meritorious Unit Commendation. For its support to the Sixth Fleet during the evacuation of the Palestine Liberation Organization from Lebanon and the subsequent deployment of Marines into Beirut, the squadron was awarded the Navy Expeditionary Medal. During this period the squadron was one of several evaluating the effect of female personnel on squadron operations. Approximately 45 women had been assigned to the roster.

In February 1986, a VP-5 crew launched following the Space Shuttle Challenger disaster and located the space shuttle nose cone to help direct recovery vessels to the site. During August of the same year, another VP-5 crew spotted a disabled Soviet Yankee-class submarine on the surface in sinking condition. The hour-by-hour monitoring of the Soviet warship was continued until it sank beneath the waves, earning the squadron a recommendation for a Meritorious Unit Commendation from CINCLANTFLT.

In December 1986 while operating out of Naval Air Station Bermuda, VP-5 participated in the Coast Guard's drug interdiction program. The resulting operations in the Caribbean netted over 17,000 pounds (7,700 kg) of marijuana.

=== 1990s ===
In June 1990 VP-5 participated in the drug interdiction program established by the Secretary of Defense. Detached to bases in the Caribbean and South America, VP-5 played a key role in the interdiction effort spotting suspicious ships and aircraft in the patrol areas.

On 1 January 1991 VP-5 deployed to Naval Air Station Rota, Spain, detachments were deployed to Naval Air Field Souda Bay, Crete; Naval Air Station Sigonella, Sicily; Naval Air Field Lajes Field, Azores; and Naval Air Station Keflavik, Iceland. During the Gulf War one aircraft of the Souda Bay detachment maintained surface surveillance patrols north of Egypt. From 3 September 1992 VP-5 deployed to Naval Air Station Keflavik, Iceland, during this deployment the squadron participated in anti-surface/mining operations with US Air Force F-15 aircraft. Ten different NATO countries were visited during this period, including the United Kingdom, Norway, Netherlands, France, Germany and Canada.

In August 1995, VP-5 became the first squadron to cover the entire Atlantic Ocean operational MPA requirement alone. "Tri-sited" between Keflavik, Puerto Rico, and Panama, VP-5 helped usher in an era of multiple detachments within a single deployment. In February 1997, the squadron repeated the deployment, maintaining high operational tempo in support of Keflavik-based anti–submarine warfare and NATO interoperability flights and Caribbean drug interdiction flights. Amassing over 6,000 flight hours through the six-month deployment, VP-5 contributed to a U.S. Southern Command (SOUTHCOM) year-long total interdiction effort valued at over one billion dollars.

In 1998, VP-5 became the first East Coast squadron to deploy with the P-3C Aircraft Improvement Program (AIP) modification. Originally designated as the ASUW Improvement Program modification, the new warfighting suite enabled MPA fliers to improve their already formidable contributions to national security objectives during the Balkans Wars. VP-5 performed missions over Bosnia-Herzegovina in support of Operation Deliberate Forge and over Kosovo in Operation Eagle Eye, bringing to the theater the first long-range, all-weather, day or night, overland reconnaissance sensor-to-shooter platform.

=== 2000s ===
Deployed to Naval Air Station Sigonella in August 2001, VP-5 relocated multiple crews and aircraft to Naval Air Field Souda Bay, following the September 11 attacks. Following the commencement of Operation Enduring Freedom, VP-5 assisted in providing theater-wide Intelligence, Surveillance, and Reconnaissance operation with 1,100 sorties encompassing 6,600 mishap-free flight hours. Additionally, the squadron supported continued efforts to maintain peace and stability in the Balkans in Operations Deliberate Forge and Joint Guardian.

On the eve of the Iraq War, VP-5 was deployed to the theatre executing 5,800 flight hours while operating from as many as eight sites simultaneously. VP-5 performed a host of missions, including Pacific and Caribbean counter-drug operations, sensitive SOUTHCOM overland reconnaissance operations, Atlantic and Mediterranean armed escort missions, and critical surface surveillance missions in the Red Sea during U.S. combat operations against Iraq. VP-5 conducted sorties over northern Iraq, operating in high-threat areas to provide real-time intelligence to U.S. forces engaged with the enemy.

During their 2006–2007 deployment, VP-5 conducted operations simultaneously in three operational theaters in support of the global war on terrorism and the war on drugs. In SOUTHCOM, VP-5 aircrews executed nearly 150 missions in support of counter drug operations, resulting in 30 metric tons of drugs seized. In U.S. Central Command (CENTCOM), Mad Foxes flew over 70 missions in support of Operations Enduring Freedom and Iraqi Freedom. In U.S. European Command (EUCOM), VP-5 flew 36 missions in direct support of Operation Active Endeavour and reinitiated support of Kosovo Force (KFOR).

In February 2008, VP-5 conducted a surge to Naval Air Station Sigonella, organizing and establishing PATRON Sigonella, a pioneering command encompassing elements from five different organizations.

In 2009, VP-5 was called upon for a multi-site deployment to include both SOUTHCOM and U. S. Pacific Command (PACOM) sites. In SOUTHCOM, VP-5 provided combat ready aircrews to execute missions in support of Joint Interagency Task Force South's (JIATF-S) counter narcotics mission. They successfully prevented drug traffickers from delivering over 30.7 metric tons of illegal narcotics worth over 2.8 billion dollars to the shores of the United States. This deployment also included redeployment to Natal, Brazil, to support the search and rescue effort for Air France Flight 447. VP-5 coordinated operations and search tactics with the Brazilian Search and Rescue Center and flew three flights searching over 6,000 square miles (16,000 km^{2}) of sea space.

In PACOM, VP-5 expertly directed the MPRA effort during several multi-national events. VP-5 orchestrated and executed a bi-lateral ASW prosecution utilizing U.S. and Japanese Maritime Self Defense Force (JMSDF) assets resulting in over 165 hours of contact time. VP-5's ASW prowess was officially recognized with the receipt of the 2009 Captain Arnold Jay Isbell Trophy.

=== 2010s–present ===
In 2011, VP-5 completed a tri-site deployment. There were 12 crews deployed to El Salvador, Naval Air Station Sigonella, and Djibouti, in support of CTG 47.1, CTG 67.1, and CTG 67.5. In response to many world events, VP-5 participated in major operations to include Odyssey Dawn, Unified Protector, Caper Focus and Enduring Freedom. VP-5 sent detachments to France (SPONTEX, George H.W. Bush Strike Group ASWEX), Greece, Sicily, and Spain (Enterprise ENCOUNTEREX) to support other United States assets and multi-nation exercises. The squadron flew over 3,956 flight hours. One of the major highlights during deployment was the historic AGM-65F Maverick engagement during Operation Odyssey Dawn. This was the first successful employment of a Maverick against a hostile target in the history of Maritime Patrol and Reconnaissance Aircraft.

During VP-5's following 12 month Inter-Deployment Readiness Cycle (IDRC) VP-5 supported the USS Iwo Jima Composite Training Exercise (COMPTUEX) and Operation Bold Alligator, the largest joint and multinational amphibious assault exercise in the past ten years. In early 2012 VP-5 continued was the first operational squadron to receive the Command, Control, Communications, and Computers for ASW (C4ASW) upgrade for the P-3C. This upgrade included Link-16 and international maritime satellite capabilities, greatly enhancing the P-3C's communication suite.

In May 2012 VP-5 deployed to Kadena Air Force Base in Okinawa, Japan and the Seventh Fleet Area of Responsibility. Bringing the first five C4ASW modified Orions seen in the theater, VP-5 immediately began providing timely and accurate Intelligence, Surveillance, and Reconnaissance (ISR), Maritime Domain Awareness (MDA), and ASW products to high level authorities in PACOM, all while practicing the ‘hub and two spoke’ method of detaching combat aircrews to Western Pacific Nations to build and foster relationships with allied countries in an ever important and dynamic region. VP-5 completed 30 detachments to countries including Australia, Brunei, Indonesia, Malaysia, Palau, Philippines, Singapore and Thailand. Furthermore, the summer of 2012 proved to be the busiest typhoon season in years and required VP-5 to evacuate from the island of Okinawa 11 times. While deployed, the squadron participated in a variety of major exercises and operations including Operation Island Chief, Operation Enduring Freedom – Philippines, Exercise Valiant Shield, Exercise Keen Sword, and Operation Kuru Kuru.

Shortly after returning from deployment, VP-5 began 2013 by becoming the navy's second squadron to transition to the P-8A Poseidon after flying the P-3C for over 39 years. The transition was concluded on 2 August 2013 with the completion of the Safe-for-Flight inspection. Following Safe-for-Flight, VP-5 independently launched the P-8A Poseidon for the first time on 6 August 2013. Following transition, VP-5 entered into a robust IDRC. For the first time VP-5 Combat Aircrews tactically employed the P-8A in the USS George H.W. Bush Group Sail Exercise, Submarine Command Course – 38, the USS Bataan ARG/MEU Exercise, the USS George H.W. Bush Composite Training Unit Exercise and Joint Task Force Exercise, and Exercise Koa Kai 14-1 – Hawaii.

In July 2014 Patrol Squadron FIVE deployed to Kadena Air Force Base in Okinawa, Japan and the Seventh Fleet Area of Responsibility. As VP-5's inaugural P-8A Poseidon deployment, VP-5 executed over 20 detachments to countries and territories including Australia, Malaysia, Diego Garcia, Bangladesh, Guam, the Philippines, Singapore, Thailand and the Republic of Korea. In addition to the numerous detachments, VP-5 evacuated aircraft from the island two times to Guam and the Philippines due to the threat of typhoons. While deployed, the squadron participated in a variety of major exercises including Valiant Shield, Keen Sword, GUAMEX, Ulchi-Freedom Guardian, TAMEX, Silent Banshee, and PHIBLEX 15.

On 19 August 2014 a People's Liberation Army Air Force J11B Flanker flew in a very close and very dangerous manner around one of VP-5's P-8As in international waters near Hainan during the squadron's first deployment to Japan with the new aircraft.

VP-5 became the first squadron to deploy the P-8A Poseidon in counter-narcotic operations in support of Operation Martillo at Cooperative Security Location (CSL) Comalapa El Salvador International Airport.

== Aircraft assignments ==
The squadron was assigned the following aircraft, effective on the dates shown:

- Martin PM-1 – January 1937
- PBY-2 Catalina – March 1938
- PBY-5 – January 1941
- PBY-5A – January 1942
- PV-1 – February 1943
- PV-2 Harpoon – June 1945
- P2V-1 Neptune – June 1948
- P2V-3 – 1951
- P2V-5 – 1954
- SP-2E – 1964
- P-3A – 1 July 1966
- P-3A (DIFAR) – December 1971
- P-3C – February 1974
- P-3C UIIIR – 1989
- P-8A – 2013

== Home port assignments ==
The squadron was assigned to these home ports, effective on the dates shown:

- FAB Seattle, Washington – 2 January 1937
- Naval Air Station Edenton, North Carolina – 20 November 1945
- Naval Air Station Quonset Point, Rhode Island −15 May 1946
- Naval Air Station San Juan, Puerto Rico – January 1947
- Naval Air Station Roosevelt Roads, Puerto Rico – June 1947
- Naval Air Station Jacksonville, Florida – December 1949

== Wing assignments ==
Wing	Tail Code	Assignment Date
Base Force		2 January 1937
Patrol Wing-4 / Fleet Air Wing-4*		1 October 1937
FAW-6		15 February 1943
FAW-6		25 March 1943
FAW-4		5 November 1943
FAW-4		19 April 1944
FAW-6		5 December 1944
FAW-4		4 August 1945
FAW-5	ED†	20 November 1945
FAW-11 / Patrol Wing-11§	ED / MC‡ / LA**	1 January 1947

- * Patrol Wing 4 was redesignated Fleet Air Wing 4 on 1 November 1942.
- † The Squadron remained a part of FAW-5, but was assigned the tail code ED on 7 November 1948
- ‡ The squadron remained a part of Fleet Air Wing 11, but was assigned the new tail code MC on 4 August 1948.
- § FAW-11 was redesignated Patrol Wing 11 on 1 July 1973.
- ** The squadron's tail code was changed from MC to LA in 1957. The effective date for this change was most likely the beginning of FY1958 (1 July 1957).

== Deployments ==
Deployment Duration	Wing	Base	Aircraft	Operating Area
17 March 1938 – April 1938	Patrol Wing-4	USS Thrush (AVP 3)	PBY-2	South Pacific
15 July 1941 – 1 Oct 1941	FAW-4	Sitka	PBY-5	North Pacific
1 February 1942 – 3 August 1942	FAW-4	USS Gillis (AVD 12)	PBY-5A	North Pacific
23 August 1942 – 15 February 1943	FAW-4	Kodiak	PBY-5A	North Pacific
23 March 1943 – 5 November 1943	FAW-4	Adak / Amchitka / Attu	PV-1	North Pacific
19 April 1944 – 23 October 1944	FAW-4	Adak / Attu	PV-1	North Pacific
4 August 1945 – 20 November 1945	FAW-4	Attu	PV-2	North Pacific
August 1950 – January 1951	FAW-11	Argentia	P2V-3	North Atlantic
July 1953 – December 1953	FAW-11	Keflavik	P2V-5	North Atlantic
October 1954 – March 1955	FAW-11	Argentia	P2V-5	North Atlantic
November 1955 – June 1956	FAW-11	Port Layuety	P2V-5	Mediterranean
March 1957-1 September 1957 (Split)	FAW-11	Keflavik	P2V-5	North Atlantic
March 1957 – October 1957 (Split)	FAW-11	Port Layuety	P2V-5	Mediterranean
June 1958 – October 1958 (Split)	FAW-11	Argentia	P2V-5	North Atlantic
July 1958 – October 1958 (Split)	FAW-11	Rota	P2V-5	Mediterranean
April 1959 – June 1959	FAW-11	Keflavik	P2V-5	North Atlantic
July 1960 – September 1960	FAW-11	Rota	P2V-5	Mediterranean
September 1960 – December 1960	FAW-11	Sigonella	P2V-5	Mediterranean
December 1961-1 September 1962	FAW-11	Rota	P2V-5	Mediterranean
December 1961 – July 1962	FAW-11	Keflavik	P2V-5	North Atlantic
July 1963 – November 1963	FAW-11	Sigonella	P2V-5	Mediterranean
1 December 1964 – 15 January 1965	FAW-11	Guantanamo	SP-2E	Caribbean
15 January 1965 – June 1965	FAW-11	Sigonella	SP-2E	Mediterranean
1 June 1967 – 3 December 1967	FAW-8	Sangley Point	P-3A	West Pacific
23 May 1968 – 3 December 1968	FAW-11	Crete / USS Tallahatchie County (AVB 2)	P-3A	Mediterranean
1 March 1970 – July 1970	FAW-11	Sigonella	P-3A	Mediterranean
1 March 1971 – 1 July 1971 (Split)	FAW-11	Rota	P-3A	Mediterranean
1 March 1971 – June 1971 (Split)	FAW-11	Lajes	P-3A	North Atlantic
24 March 1972 – 20 August 1972	FAW-11	Sigonella	P-3A	North Atlantic
March 1973 – May 1973	FAW-11	Rota	P-3A	North Atlantic
June 1973 – August 1973	FAW-11	Lajes	P-3A	North Atlantic
September 1974 – March 1975	Patrol Wing-11	Sigonella	P-3C	Mediterranean
February 1976 – July 1976	Patrol Wing-11	Keflavik	P-3C	North Atlantic
April 1977 – September 1977	Patrol Wing-11	Sigonella	P-3C	Mediterranean
22 September 1978 – February 1979	Patrol Wing-11	Keflavik	P-3C	North Atlantic
7 December 1979 – April 1980	Patrol Wing-11	Bermuda	P-3C	Atlantic
7 February 1981 – July 1981	Patrol Wing-11	Sigonella	P-3C	Mediterranean
May 1982-3 November 1982	Patrol Wing-11	Sigonella	P-3C	Mediterranean
November 1983 – April 1984 (Split)	Patrol Wing-11	Rota	P-3C	Mediterranean
November 1983 – April 1984 (Split)	Patrol Wing-11	Lajes	P-3C	Mediterranean
January 1985-20 June 1985	Patrol Wing-11	Sigonella	P-3C	Mediterranean
August 1986 – January 1987	Patrol Wing-11	Bermuda	P-3C	Atlantic
January 1988 – June 1988	Patrol Wing-11	Sigonella	P-3C	Mediterranean
1 August 1989 – 10 February 1990	Patrol Wing-11	Bermuda	P-3C	Atlantic
1 January 1991 – July 1991	Patrol Wing-11	Rota	P-3C	Mediterranean
3 September 1992 – March 1993	Patrol Wing-11	Keflavik	P-3C	North Atlantic
1 September 1993 – March 1994	Patrol Wing-11	Keflavik	P-3C	North Atlantic
February 1994 – August 1994	Patrol Wing-11	Keflavik	P-3C	North Atlantic
August 1995 – February 1996	Patrol Wing-11	Keflavik	P-3C	North Atlantic
February 1997 – August 1997 (Split)	Patrol Wing-11	Keflavik	P-3C	North Atlantic
February 1997 – August 1997 (Split)	Patrol Wing-11	Roosevelt Roads	P-3C	Caribbean
February 1997 – August 1997 (Split)	Patrol Wing-11	Panama	P-3C	Caribbean
August 1998 – February 1999	Patrol Wing-11	Sigonella	P-3C	Mediterranean
February 2000 – August 2000 (Split)	Patrol Wing-11	Keflavik	P-3C	North Atlantic
February 2000 – August 2000 (Split)	Patrol Wing-11	Roosevelt Roads	P-3C	Caribbean
August 2001 – February 2002 (Split)	Patrol Wing-11	Sigonella	P-3C	Mediterranean
August 2001 – February 2002 (Split)	Patrol Wing-11	Souda Bay	P-3C	Mediterranean
February 2003 – August 2003 (Split)	Patrol Wing-11	Keflavik	P-3C	North Atlantic
February 2003 – August 2003 (Split)	Patrol Wing-11	Roosevelt Roads	P-3C	Caribbean
February 2003 – August 2003 (Split)	Patrol Wing-11	Hato	P-3C	Caribbean
December 2004 – May 2005 (Split)	Patrol Wing-11	Sigonella	P-3C	Mediterranean
December 2004 – May 2005 (Split)	Patrol Wing-11	Al Udeid	P-3C	Gulf
December 2004 – May 2005 (Split)	Patrol Wing-11	Comalapa	P-3C	Caribbean
December 2004 – May 2005 (Split)	Patrol Wing-11	Hato	P-3C	Caribbean
June 2006 – December 2006 (Split)	Patrol Wing-11	Sigonella	P-3C	Mediterranean
June 2006 – December 2006 (Split)	Patrol Wing-11	Al Udeid	P-3C	Gulf
June 2006 – December 2006 (Split)	Patrol Wing-11	Comalapa	P-3C	Caribbean
December 2008 – June 2009 (Split)	Patrol Wing-11	Kadena	P-3C	West Pacific
December 2008 – June 2009 (Split)	Patrol Wing-11	Comalapa	P-3C	Caribbean
December 2010 – June 2011 (Split)	Patrol Wing-11	Sigonella	P-3C	Mediterranean
December 2010 – June 2011 (Split)	Patrol Wing-11	Djibouti	P-3C	Africa
December 2010 – June 2011 (Split)	Patrol Wing-11	Comalapa	P-3C	Caribbean
May 2012 – December 2012	Patrol Wing-11	Kadena	P-3C	West Pacific
June 2014 – February 2015	Patrol Wing-11	Kadena	P-8A	West Pacific
March 2016 – September 2016 (Split)	Patrol Wing-11	Misawa	P-8A	West Pacific
March 2016 – September 2016 (Split)	Patrol Wing-11	Bahrain	P-8A	West Pacific

== See also ==
- Maritime patrol aircraft
- List of United States Navy aircraft squadrons
- List of inactive United States Navy aircraft squadrons
- List of squadrons in the Dictionary of American Naval Aviation Squadrons
- History of the United States Navy
