= VPB-121 =

Patrol Bombing Squadron 121
- Active: 1 October 1937 – 1 June 1946
- Country: United States of America
- Branch: United States Navy
- Type: squadron
- Role: Maritime patrol
- Engagements: World War II

Aircraft flown
- Patrol: P2Y-3; PBY-5/5A; PB4Y-1; PB4Y-2

VPB-121 was a Patrol Bombing Squadron of the U.S. Navy. The squadron was established as Patrol Squadron 19 (VP-19) on 1 October 1937, redesignated Patrol Squadron 43 (VP-43) on 1 July 1939, redesignated Patrol Squadron 81 (VP-81) on 1 July 1941, redesignated Patrol Bombing Squadron 121 (VPB-121) on 1 October 1944 and disestablished on 1 June 1946.

== Operational history ==
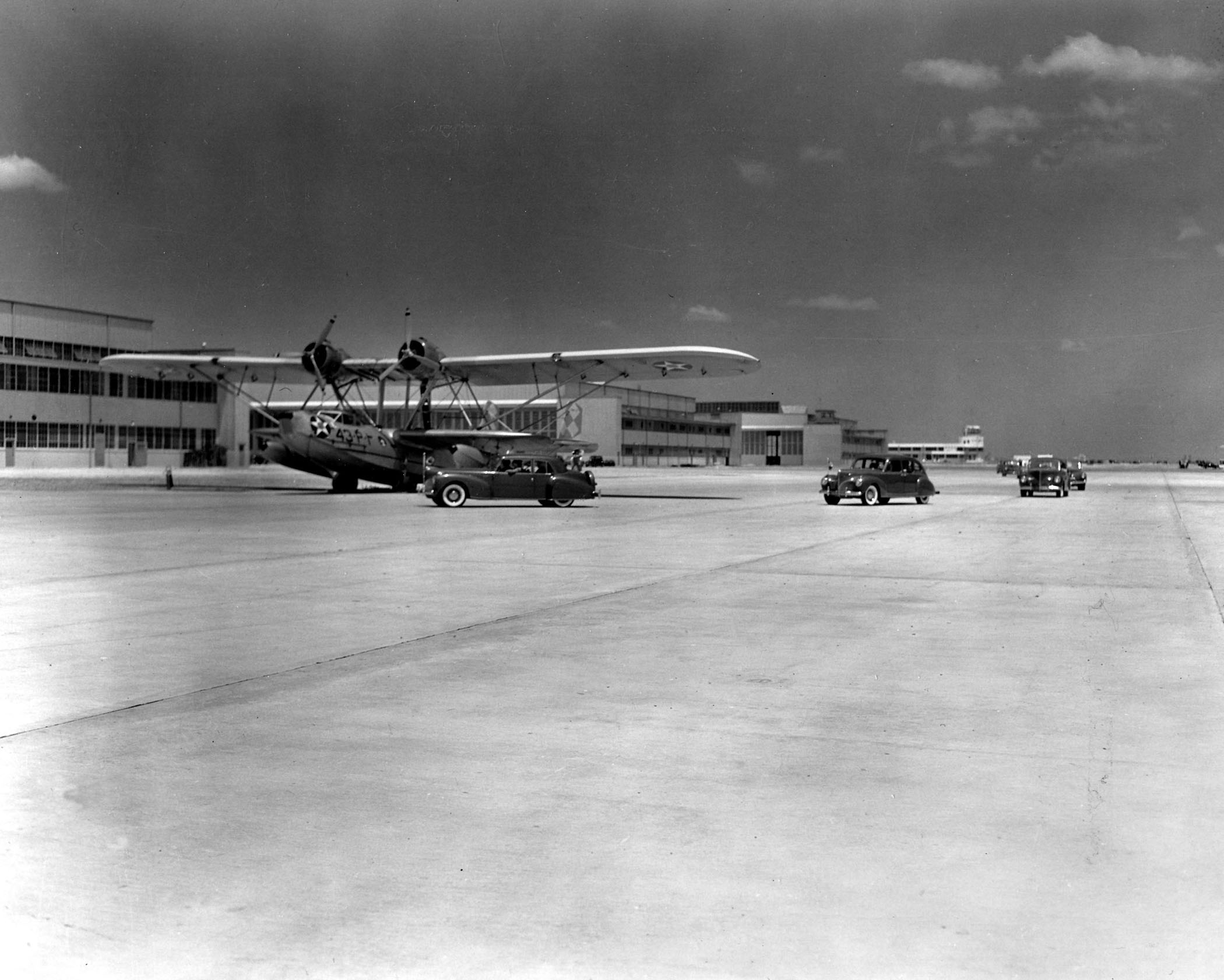
VP-43 P2Y-3 at NAS Jacksonville in 1941

- 1 October 1937: VP-19 was established at NAS Seattle, Washington and assigned six P2Y-3 flying boats.
- 17 March 1938: PatWing-4 squadrons VPs 16, 17 and 19 participated in Fleet Exercise XIX as part of White Force. The combined squadrons provided patrol sector searches out to 600 miles (970 km). Attacks against the Black Force were judged to have inflicted major damage to elements of the enemy fleet. The exercise featured the first operational use by the Navy of long-range radio bearings for aeronautical navigation.
- 1 June 1938: VP-19, refitted with six new P2Y-3s, deployed to FAB Japonski Island, a recently completed seaplane base in Alaskan waters. Detachments were rotated to Sitka, Alaska, during the eight-week tour of duty. The squadron returned to NAS Seattle on 1 August.
- 20 March 1941: VP-43 was directed to fly its aging P2Y-3s to NAS Pensacola, Florida, for PBY Catalina replacements. The replacements, however, were in San Diego, California, requiring the squadron to travel there by train to pick up the new aircraft, arriving on 3 May 1941. There was a delay in accepting the aircraft while the Consolidated Aircraft Company installed self-sealing fuel cells, armor and upgraded waist gun stations. The squadron flew the new Catalinas back to NAS Pensacola when the work was completed.
- 13 June 1941: VP-43 was relocated from NAS Pensacola to NAS Norfolk, Virginia. On 13 June the squadron turned over its new PBY-5s to VP-52 which had just arrived at NAS Norfolk from NAS Argentia, Newfoundland. In the aircraft exchange the squadron received VP-52’s well-used PBY-5s.
- 8 July 1941: The squadron, which had been depleted by transfers to other squadrons, was brought up to full strength. A flight training and ground school training syllabus on the PBY-5 aircraft was begun for new squadron personnel at NAS Norfolk.
- 22 October 1941: VP-81 was assigned the additional mission of an Operational Training Unit (OTU) for patrol squadrons attached to the Atlantic Fleet. The squadron was relocated from NAS Norfolk to NAS Key West, Florida. Operational patrols were conducted in conjunction with training flights off the East Coast.
- 21 December 1941: The squadron claimed a U-boat sunk off the coast of Key West, however postwar examination of enemy records does not indicate any losses in that locality on that date.
- 1 September 1942: VP-81 was transferred to NAS San Juan, Puerto Rico, under the operational control of PatWing-12. The squadron conducted Anti-submarine warfare (ASW) searches in the Caribbean area.
- 1 June 1943: The squadron was relocated to NAS Guantanamo Bay, Cuba, under the operational control of FAW-11. ASW patrols, night antishipping patrols and convoy coverage were the primary duties of VP-81.
- 1 August 1943: VP-81 was transferred to NAS San Diego, California, in preparation for the trans-Pacific flight to the South Pacific. New amphibious models of the Catalina, PBY-5As, were assigned as replacement aircraft while the squadron underwent additional training for its upcoming combat assignment.
- 1 November 1943: The squadron flew its trans-Pacific to NAS Kaneohe Bay, Hawaii, where additional training was given before further reassignment to the combat zone.
- 25 November 1943: VP-81 was transferred to Henderson Field, Guadalcanal, relieving VP-54. Its duties consisted of search missions of the Saint George Channel, providing convoy coverage and nighttime Black Cat operations. The squadron came under the operational control of FAW-1.
- 3 February 1944: VP-81 was transferred to Munda, New Georgia Islands. Black Cat operations were conducted in conjunction with nearby PT boat squadrons. Bombing strikes against land-based installations were carried out in the Choiseul Bay area.
- 7 May 1944: VP-81 was relocated to Piva Airfield, Bougainville Island, where Black Cat nighttime operations were conducted against enemy shipping.
- 1 July 1944: The squadron returned to NAS San Diego.
- 8 September 1944: Upon return from leave, squadron aircrews were reassigned PB4Y-1 Liberators in place of Catalinas. Ground school and flight training took place at NAAF Camp Kearney, California. The squadron came under the operational control of FAW-14. Training had progressed to the advanced syllabus at NAS Brown Field, California, in preparation for the upcoming second combat tour in the Pacific. While in training, the squadron was assigned the PB4Y-2 Privateer in place of the older Liberator aircraft.
- 6 January 1945: VPB-121 flew its trans-Pacific flight to NAS Kaneohe Bay, where the squadron began intensive training in radar navigation. Operational search patrols in the vicinity of the Hawaiian Islands were also assigned as part of the training.
- 26 January – 1 February 1945: The squadron was relocated to Midway Island and put on barrier patrols and daytime ASW patrols, returning to NAS Kaneohe Bay on 1 February 1945.
- 1 March – 1 April 1945: VPB-121 was transferred to Eniwetok. On 7 March 1945, the squadron conducted its first strikes on land installations at Wake Island. The missions continued through 1 April, when Ponape was added to the target list.
- 3 July 1945: VPB-121 was transferred to Tinian. On 8 July a detachment was assigned to Iwo Jima.
- 3 August 1945: Two Privateers from the Iwo Jima detachment spotted a downed P-51 pilot floating near the enemy-occupied island of Sagami Nada. While directing an American submarine to the location, the two aircraft sank one enemy ship that tried to interfere, and downed three Japanese fighters. Lieutenant Ralph D. Ettinger and his crew accounted for two of the eight fighters that attacked the Privateers. For his bravery in leading the defense against superior enemy forces for over 40 minutes of constant action, Ettinger was awarded the Navy Cross. Lieutenant Commander Raymond J. Pflum, commanding officer of VPB-121, was the pilot of the second aircraft. His crew shot down one of the enemy fighters and was responsible for sinking the Japanese cargo vessel. He was also awarded the Navy Cross.
- 7 August 1945: Two of the squadron’s Privateers were caught by five enemy fighters in the area of Sagami Wan. One enemy aircraft was shot down and one of the squadron PB4Y-2 bombers was shot down in flames, with no survivors.
- 1 September 1945: VPB-121 was assigned weather flights out of Iwo Jima until the end of September when the squadron was relieved for return to NAS San Diego.
- 1 June 1946: VPB-121 was disestablished at NAS San Diego.

== Aircraft assignments ==
The squadron was assigned the following aircraft, effective on the dates shown:

- P2Y-3 - October 1937
- PBY-5 - May 1941
- PBY-5A - August 1943
- PB4Y-1 - September 1944
- PB4Y-2 - October 1944

== Home port assignments ==
The squadron was assigned to these home ports, effective on the dates shown:

- NAS Seattle, Washington - 1 October 1937
- NAS Pensacola, Florida - 20 March 1941
- NAS Norfolk, Virginia - 13 June 1941
- NAS Key West, Florida - 22 October 1941
- NAS San Juan, Puerto Rico - 1 September 1942
- NAS Guantanamo Bay, Cuba - 1 June 1943
- NAS San Diego, California - 1 August 1943
- NAS Kaneohe Bay, Hawaii - 1 November 1943
- NAS San Diego - 1 July 1944
- NAAF Camp Kearney, California - 8 September 1944
- NAS Brown Field, California - November 1944
- NAS Kaneohe Bay - 6 January 1945
- NAS San Diego - September 1945

== See also ==
- Maritime patrol aircraft
- List of inactive United States Navy aircraft squadrons
- List of United States Navy aircraft squadrons
- List of squadrons in the Dictionary of American Naval Aviation Squadrons
- History of the United States Navy
