= Coast Guard Air Station Kodiak =

US Coast Guard base in Kodiak, Alaska

Coordinates: 57.7503°N 152.5060°W

Air Station Kodiak
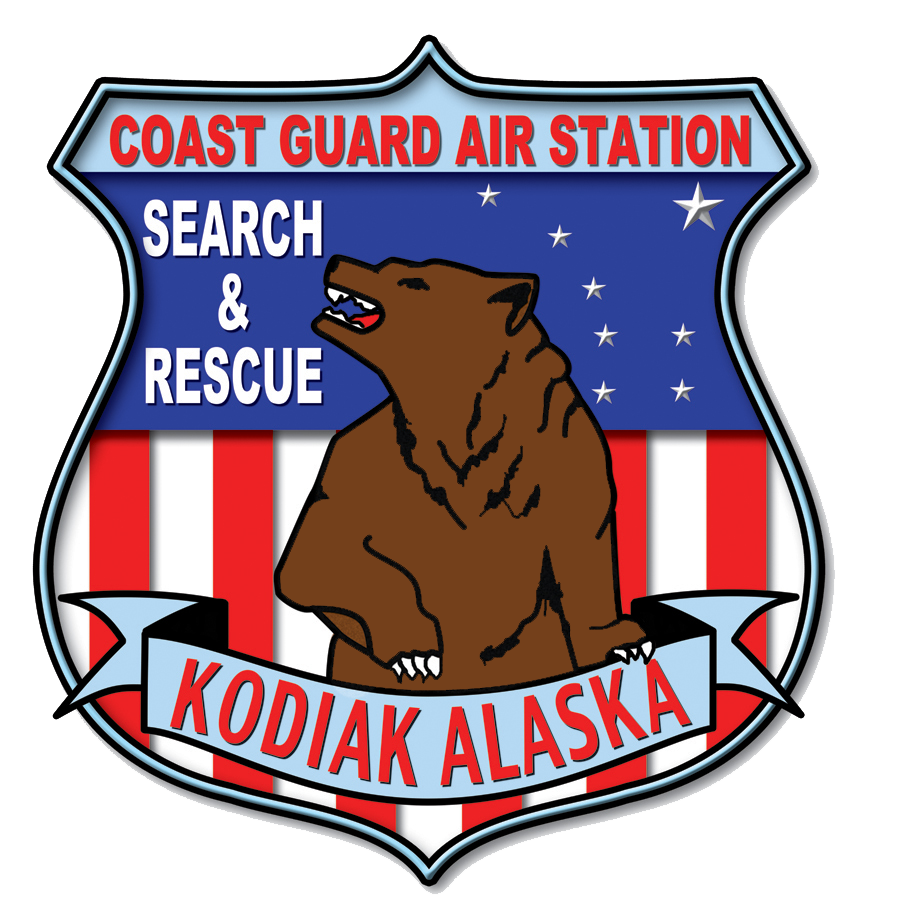
- Unit Patch CGAS Kodiak
- Active: 1947–present
- Country: United States
- Branch: United States Coast Guard
- Type: Air Station
- Role: Search and rescue, maritime patrol, logistics

Aircraft flown
- Helicopter: MH-60 Jayhawk, MH-65 Dolphin
- Patrol: HC-130 Hercules

Coast Guard Air Station Kodiak is an Air Station of the United States Coast Guard located in Kodiak, Alaska. It is the largest in the service's Pacific Area, with a crew of 85 officers and 517 enlisted personnel, and the largest Coast Guard Base in terms of physical size at 23,000 acres. It is a tenant command of Base Support Unit Kodiak, and shares its airfield with Kodiak Airport. The station operates MH-60 Jayhawk helicopters and the HC-130 Hercules fixed-wing aircraft.

== History ==
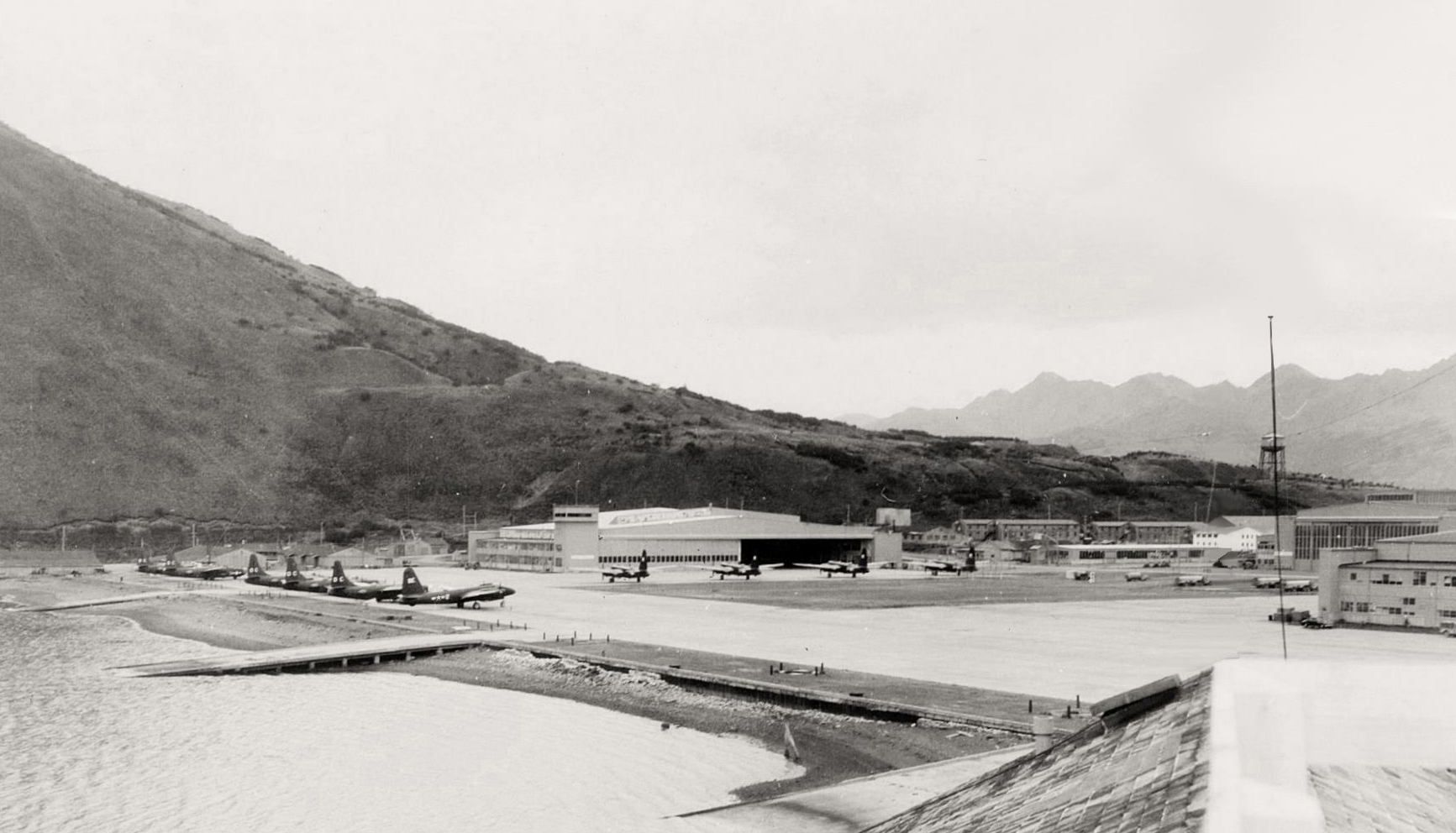
Naval Air Station Kodiak in 1949

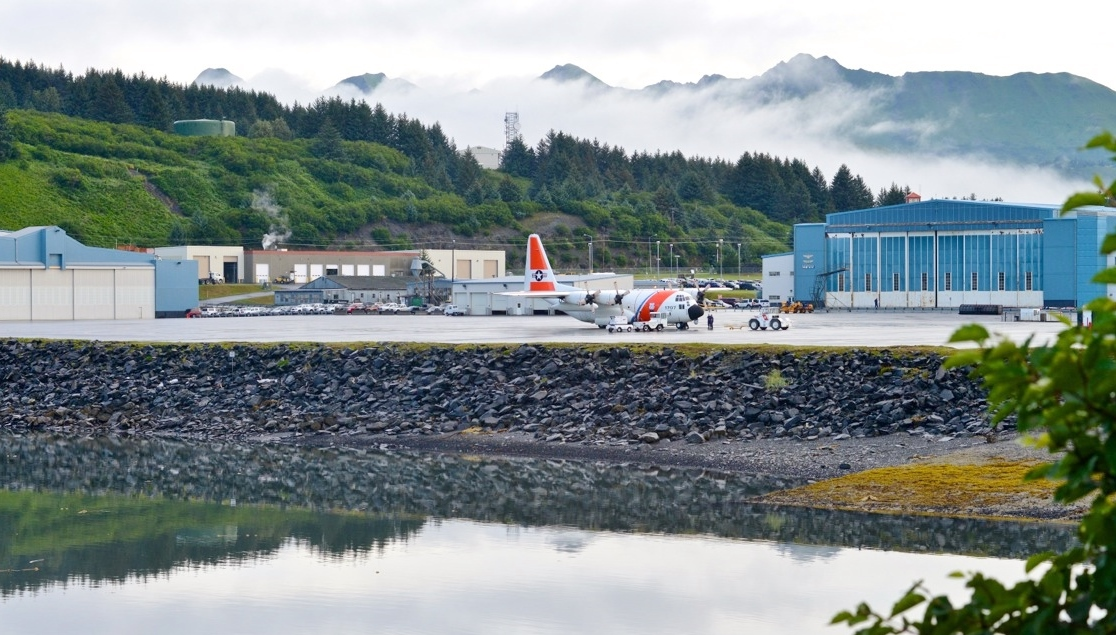
Air Station Kodiak Island in 2014

The United States Navy started construction of a naval air station at Kodiak in September 1939, and the station was commissioned on 15 June 1941. Home to PBY patrol squadrons early in World War II, Kodiak supported the Aleutian Islands Campaign of 1943, also operating scouting and air transport squadrons. In October 1950, NAS Kodiak was redesignated as Naval Station Kodiak, and in 1972 the site was turned over to the U.S. Coast Guard.

Coast Guard Air Station Kodiak was originally commissioned as an Air Detachment in April 1947, with seven pilots and 30 enlisted men operating a single PBY Catalina. This was the Coast Guard's first aircraft permanently stationed in Alaska.

== Operations ==
The station's primary mission is aerial search and rescue in a 4,000,000-square-mile (10,000,000 km^{2}) area of responsibility covering the Gulf of Alaska, Bristol Bay, the Bering Sea, and Alaska's Pacific coast. It is also responsible for patrolling offshore fisheries, deploying HH-65 helicopters aboard High Endurance Cutters operating off Alaska, and providing logistical support to various Coast Guard units in the area. The latter mission includes transporting aids to navigation personnel who maintain remote shore beacons that are only accessible by air.

== Popular culture ==
CGAS Kodiak is one of the main locations of the 2006 action-adventure drama film The Guardian, starring Kevin Costner, Ashton Kutcher, and Melissa Sagemiller. However, the film was shot at Air Station Elizabeth City in North Carolina, with snow being brought in by trucks to resemble an Alaskan landscape. The setting for the film is the United States Coast Guard and their Aviation Survival Technician (AST) program.
