= Frank D. Wagner (admiral) =

American vice admiral

Frank Dechant Wagner
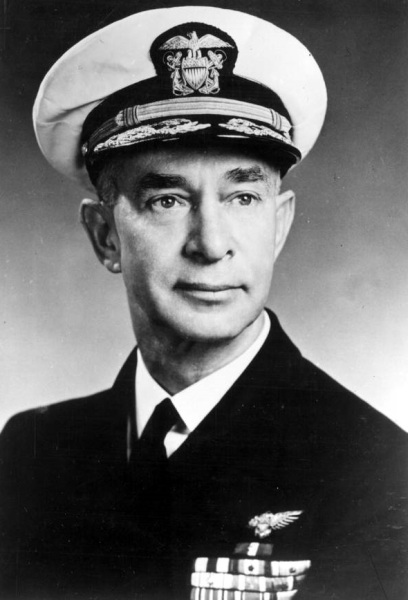
- RADM Frank D. Wagner, USN
- Born: August 22, 1893; Pottstown, Pennsylvania, US
- Died: January 9, 1966 (aged 72); Foley, Alabama, US
- Military career
- Allegiance: United States
- Branch: United States Navy
- Service years: 1915–1950
- Rank: Vice admiral
- Commands: 17th Naval District; Chief of Naval Air Training; Carrier Division Five; Patrol Wing 10; USS Langley; Fighting Squadron 2
- Conflicts: Occupation of Veracuz; World War I World War II: Defense of the Philippines; Dutch East Indies campaign; New Guinea campaign; Liberation of the Philippines; Borneo campaign
- Awards: Distinguished Service Medal (2); Legion of Merit

Frank Dechant Wagner (August 22, 1893 – January 9, 1966) was a highly decorated Naval aviator in the United States Navy with the rank of vice admiral. A Naval Academy graduate, Wagner distinguished himself as commander of Patrol Wing Ten during operations against the enemy in the early weeks of the Japanese Invasion of the Philippines. He was then promoted to the general officer's rank and served as commander, Aircraft, Seventh Fleet during liberation of the Philippines in 1944–1945.

Following the War, Wagner served as chief of naval air training at Naval Air Station Pensacola, Florida, and completed his career as commandant, 17th Naval District with headquarters at Kodiak, Alaska.

== Early career ==
Wagner was born on August 22, 1893, in Pottstown, Pennsylvania, as the son of Jonas S. and Adelaide Wagner (née Dechant). When Wagner was ten years old, his mother died. He continued to live with his older sister and father, a Bank president. Young Frank graduated from Pottstown Senior High School in summer 1911 and received an appointment to the United States Naval Academy at Annapolis, Maryland. The next year, Wagner lost his sister to tuberculosis and his father a short time later; Wagner had no immediate family.

While at the academy, he was active in class football, baseball and wrestling and was nicknamed "Honus" and "Fwankie Dear" due to his care-free and easy going personality. Wagner also took part in the midshipmen cruise aboard the battleship Nebraska off the coast of Veracruz during the Mexican Revolution.

Wagner graduated with Bachelor of Science degree on June 5, 1915, and was commissioned as an ensign in the United States Navy on that date. He was subsequently attached to the protected cruiser Des Moines and took part in the patrol cruises to the Middle East. Wagner was still serving aboard Des Moines, when the United States entered the World War I, and he was successively promoted to the ranks of Lieutenant (junior grade) and lieutenant.

He then participated in the escort duty with the Atlantic Fleet until early 1918, when he was ordered back to the States for torpedo instruction at Naval Torpedo Station at Newport, Rhode Island. Upon the completion of the instruction, Wagner joined the newly commissioned destroyer Lea under the command of future admiral, then-lieutenant commander David W. Bagley.

Wagner served aboard Lea in Atlantic just until early 1919, when he was transferred to destroyer McKean and then to Herbert. He participated in another tour of patrol cruises in the Mediterranean and South Atlantic, before he was ordered to the Naval Air Station Pensacola, Florida, for flight training in December 1920.

He completed the training, being designated Naval aviator in December 1921 and was assigned to the Air Squadrons, Battle Fleet, operating in the Pacific Ocean. Wagner returned to the Naval Air Station Pensacola, Florida, in June 1923 and served as an instructor of flying until the end of August 1925, when he was transferred to the Naval Air Station Anacostia in Washington, D.C.

Wagner was promoted to lieutenant commander on January 19, 1926, and after brief tour on the staff of the Naval Academy at Annapolis, Maryland, he was assigned to the staff of commander, Air Squadrons, Battle Fleet under Rear admiral Joseph M. Reeves in July 1926. He then assumed command of Fighting Squadron 2 and led it during the first dive bombing exercise and his Curtiss F6C Hawks and FB-5s, scored 19 hits with 45 bombs on a target 100 feet by 45 feet.

In July 1929, Wagner was transferred to the Bureau of Aeronautics in Washington, D.C., and served under Rear admiral William A. Moffett until June 1933, when he joined seaplane tender Langley under Captain Kenneth Whiting. The Langley operated off the California coast and Hawaii engaged in training fleet units, experimentation, pilot training, and tactical-fleet problems.

Wagner was later transferred to the staff of Commander-in-Chief, United States Fleet under his former superior officer, Admiral Joseph M. Reeves and was promoted to commander on January 1, 1936. He served as Aviation officer aboard battleship Pennsylvania, the flagship of Admiral Reeves, and participated in the Fleet Problem XIV, off the coast of California.

He was transferred to the Naval Air Station Norfolk, Virginia, in June that year and served as Station's Executive officer until June 1939, when he was transferred to Lexington as executive officer under Captain John H. Hoover. Wagner participated in the Fleet Problem XX off the Hawaii and was given his own command in mid-June 1940, when he assumed command of seaplane tender, Langley, where he served in 1933.

The Langley was stationed in Manila, the Philippines, as a part of the Asiatic Fleet and Wagner held that command until July 1941, when he was promoted to captain and appointed commander, Patrol Wing 10 (PatWing10), also stationed in the Far East.

== World War II ==
=== Philippines campaign 1941-1942 ===
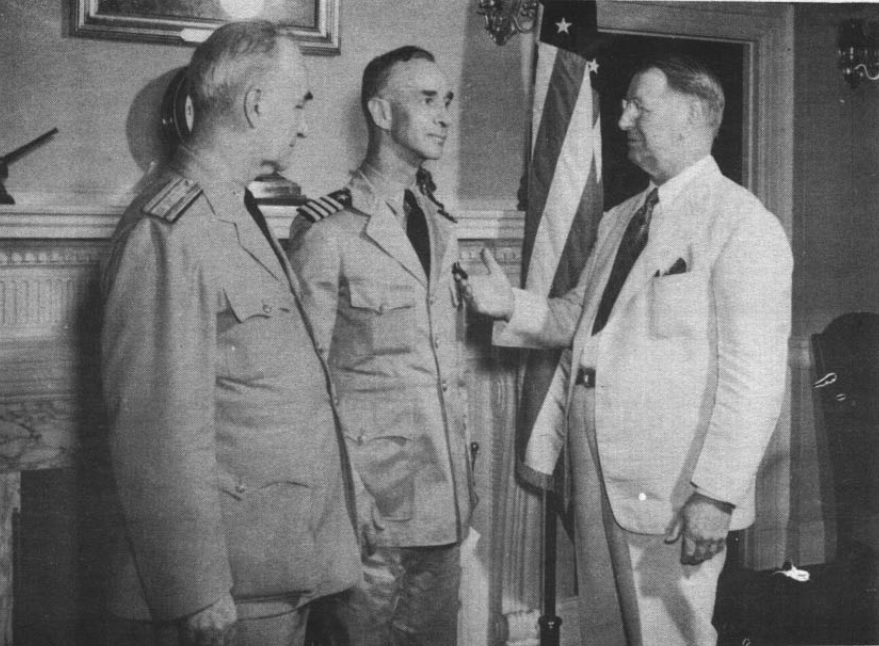
Wagner (center) receives Navy Distinguished Service Medal for his service in the Philippines from Secretary of the Navy Frank Knox. Rear admiral Randall Jacobs, Chief of Bureau of Naval Personnel looks on.

The PatWing 10 was located at Naval Station Cavite and consisted of seaplanes tender Langley (Wagner's previous command); destroyers Childs and William B. Preston; minesweeper Heron; and patrol squadrons VP-101 and VP-102. Wagner's wing conducted neutrality patrols in South China Sea and he witnessed the situation in nearby China, where Imperial Japanese Army fought the Chinese during Second Sino-Japanese War.

Wagner and PatWing10 was later to move to Davao Gulf, where they flew patrols eastward over the Philippine Sea and informally linked up with similar Dutch Navy patrols further south. He later received an order from Washington to survey the Spratly Islands in South China Sea, which could be used for potential enemy's purposes. The PBY Catalinas of PatWing10 located several Japanese fighters located over the islands and documents that. The report with photos was sent to Washington and the matter was closed. The wing's patrol planes also sighted 20 transports at Cam Ranh Bay on December 2, 1941, and the next day, planes reported more than 50 with support of cruisers and destroyers.

Few hours after midnight on December 8, 1941, Japanese Mitsubishi A6M Zeros attacked the PatWing10 planes stationed in Davao Gulf and sunk two PBY Catalinas on the water. Wagner received a message from Admiral Thomas C. Hart, Commander-in-Chief, Asiatic Fleet: "Japan started hostilities. Govern yourself accordingly."

He put his plan for defense in effect and ordered his Catalinas to perform reconnaissance over the South China Sea. His planes were equipped with 250 lb bombs, but their machine guns were filled with training ammunition, the only ammunition available for the planes in the Philippines. Wagner planned to disperse his seaplanes so they could not all be destroyed at the same time. He sent his seaplanes to Manila Bay, Cavite, Los Baños, and Laguna de Bay; and seven seaplanes kept at Olongapo to conduct reconnaissance over the South China Sea.

After ten days of fighting, with its operating area rendered untenable by Japanese control of the air, Wagner received orders from Admiral Thomas C. Hart, Commander-in-Chief, Asiatic Fleet, to move his wing from the Philippines to Ambon Island, Dutch East Indies. His planes then patrolled the Molucca Strait and Wagner was appointed commander, aircraft, Asiatic Fleet on January 6, 1942. His command consisted of his former PatWing10 reinforced by Catalinas from Patrol Squadron 22; minesweepers Lark, Whippoorwill, Tanager, Quail; and several other auxiliary vessels.

Wagner remained in that assignment until the end of February, when the Asiatic Fleet practically ceased to exist due to loss of half of its vessels. The remaining ships were assigned to the South West Pacific Area Command under General Douglas MacArthur and retreated to Perth, Australia during March 1942. From his command, seaplanes tender Langley was sunk and 42 of 45 PBYs lost.

=== Back in the States ===
Following his return stateside in May 1942, Wagner was subsequently ordered back to the United States and decorated with Navy Distinguished Service Medal for his service in the Philippines and Dutch East Indies. He was also decorated with the Order of Orange-Nassau by the Queen Wilhelmina of the Netherlands for his service during the defense of Dutch East Indies. Wagner was then assigned to the War Plans Division, Office of the Chief of Naval Operations under Admiral Ernest J. King. He also assumed additional duty as a member of the Permanent Joint Board on Defense, Canada-United States. While in this capacity, he was promoted to the temporary rank of rear admiral on July 25, 1942.

He was detached from the War Plans Division and assumed duty as commander, Fleet Air Command, Seattle, while retained his additional duty at the Permanent Joint Board on Defense. In February 1943, Wagner was succeeded by Captain John P. Whitney in the Board of Defense and joined the Office of the Vice Chief of Naval Operations under Vice admiral Frederick J. Horne as Director of the Aviation Division.

In mid-August 1943, Wagner was transferred to the Office of the Chief of Naval Operations and assumed duty as Assistant Deputy Chief of Naval Operations for Air under Vice admiral John S. McCain. He participated in the expansion of Naval Air Transport Service, a network of airlines that has greatly eased the transportation burden in all parts of the globe. Wagner received Legion of Merit for his service in this capacity.

=== New Guinea, Philippines and Borneo ===
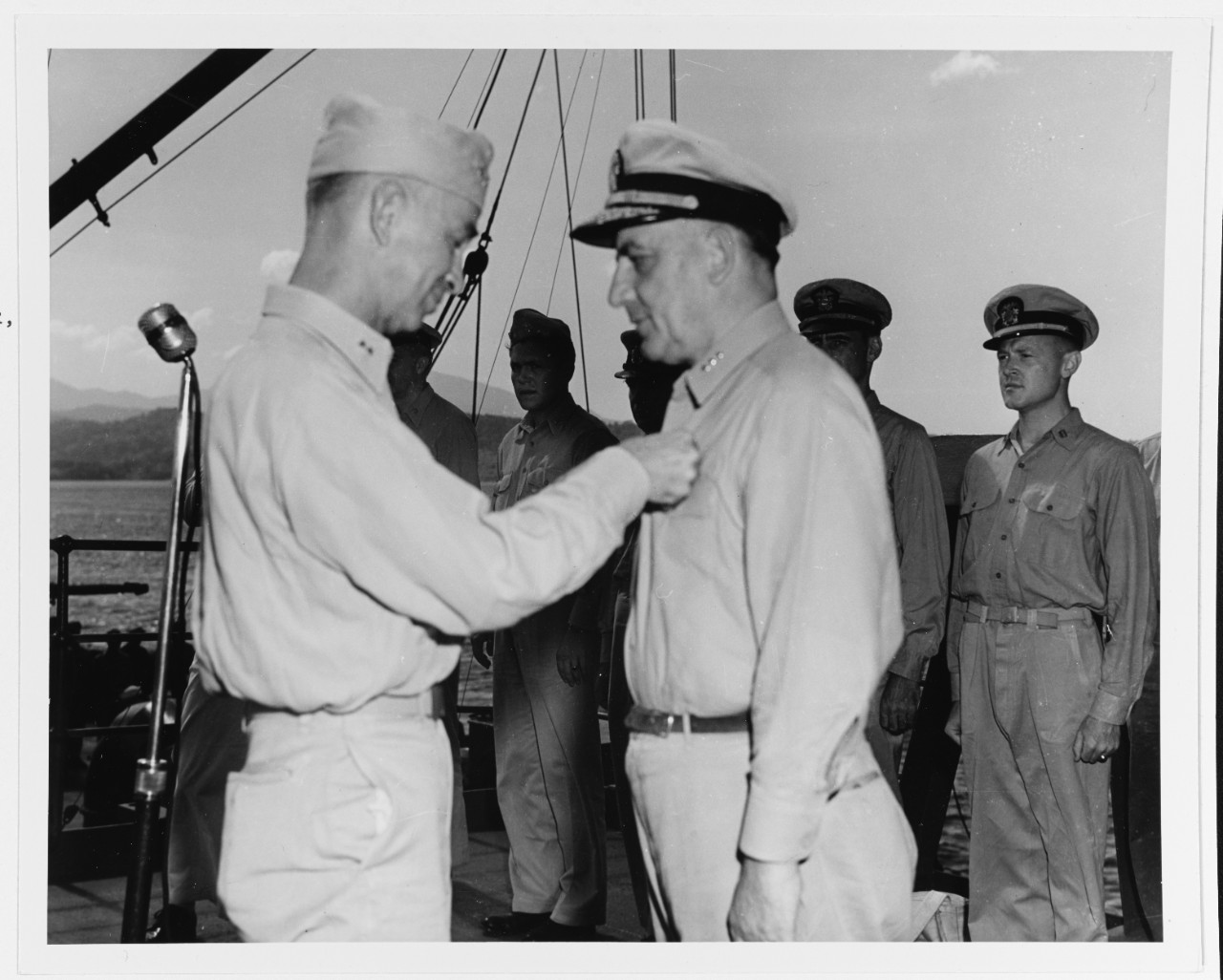
Wagner (left) decorates Vice admiral Daniel E. Barbey in March 1945.

Wagner intended to return to combat zone in Pacific and persuaded his superior officer, Vice Admiral McCain, to do so and proposed Rear Admiral Arthur W. Radford as his replacement. In April 1944 Wagner assumed command of newly created Carrier Division Five, consisting of brand new aircraft carriers Wasp and Hornet. His division belonged to the Fast Carrier Task Force under Vice Admiral Marc Mitscher, who felt that Wagner did not measure up to his formula for leadership and considered him boastful and irritating. Wagner spent two months with his command at Pearl Harbor, Hawaii, and was replaced by Rear Admiral Joseph J. Clark by the end of June 1944.

He then joined the staff of Seventh Fleet under Vice admiral Thomas C. Kinkaid as commander, Air, Seventh Fleet. While in this capacity, Wagner had all fleet's aircraft under his command and commanded them during operations on New Guinea, liberation of the Philippine Islands and Borneo. He distinguished in this capacity and received his second Navy Distinguished Service Medal.

== Postwar service ==
Following the War, Wagner assumed duty as commander of newly established Naval Air Reserve Training Command at Naval Air Station Glenview, Illinois, on November 1, 1945. In this capacity, he was supposed to supervise all air stations conducting naval reserve training. Wagner remained in this capacity only for a month and half, before being transferred to Naval Air Station Pensacola, Florida, for duty as chief of naval air training. He was also responsible for the entire Naval Aviation program and also was host to Advertising Commission aboard the aircraft carrier Saipan at its regular meeting September 11–12, 1946. The aircraft carrier Saipan trained student pilots from Pensacola.

In June 1948, Wagner was transferred to San Diego, California, where he was appointed commander, Air Fleet, West Coast, responsible for all Naval Air units, including naval air station; training facilities and squadrons; and defense of the West Coast. He was transferred to Kodiak, Alaska, by the end of May 1949 and assumed duty as commandant, Seventeenth Naval District. His district consisted of the following geographic area: Alaska, including the Aleutian Islands and Wagner was responsible for its defense until the end of May 1950.

Wagner was subsequently ordered to the headquarters of Twelfth Naval district at Mare Island Navy Yard in Vallejo, California, awaiting retirement. He retired from active duty on July 1, 1950, after 35 years of service and was advanced to the rank of vice admiral on the retired list for having been specially commended in combat.

== Retirement ==
After retiring from the Navy in 1950, Wagner settled in Pensacola, Florida, where he had been stationed several times during his career. He was a member of the Episcopal Church.

He was killed in the traffic crash when the car he was ridding collided with a state dump truck on the state intersection near Foley, Alabama. The car was driven by his wife, Catherine, who survived the crash. Vice admiral Frank D. Wagner was buried at Edgewood Cemetery in his native Pottstown, Pennsylvania, with Admirals Matthias B. Gardner, Austin K. Doyle and William Sinton as pallbearers.

== Decorations ==
Vice admiral Wagner's personal decorations include:

Naval Aviator Badge
| 1st Row | Navy Distinguished Service Medal with one 5/16" Gold Star | | Legion of Merit |
| 2nd Row | Mexican Service Medal | World War I Victory Medal with Atlantic Fleet Clasp | American Defense Service Medal with Fleet Clasp |
| 3rd Row | Asiatic-Pacific Campaign Medal with one silver 3/16 inch service star | American Campaign Medal | World War II Victory Medal |
| 4th Row | Philippine Defense Medal | Philippine Liberation Medal with two stars | Dutch Order of Orange-Nassau, Knight Commander |

== See also ==
- Philippines campaign (1941–1942)

Military offices
| Preceded by Alfred E. Montgomery | Commandant, Seventeenth Naval District; June 1, 1949 - May 1, 1950 | Succeeded by Clifton A. F. Sprague |
| Preceded by Charles A. Pownall | Chief of Naval Air Training; December 20, 1945 - June 1, 1948 | Succeeded by John W. Reeves Jr. |
| Preceded by Unit activated | Commander, Naval Air Reserve Training Command; November 1, 1945 - December 16, 1945 | Succeeded by Edward C. Ewen |
| Preceded by Unit activated | Commander, Carrier Division Five; April 25, 1944 - June 30, 1944 | Succeeded by Joseph J. Clark |
