= Roebuck Bay Seaplane Base =

Former United States Navy Base

Coordinates: 18°07′S 122°16′E

Location of Roebuck Bay Seaplane Base in Western Australia
United States Navy in 1942.

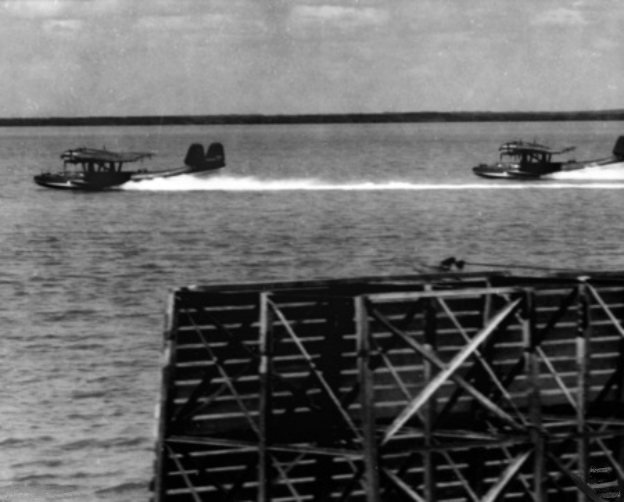
Dutch Dornier Do 24s taking off from Roebuck Bay 1941

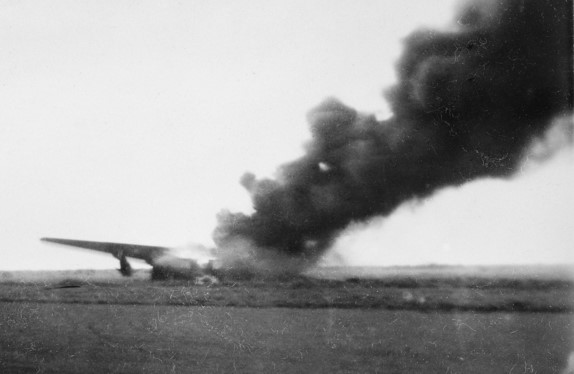
At Broome airstrip a US B-24 is destroyed in the March 3, 1942 raid

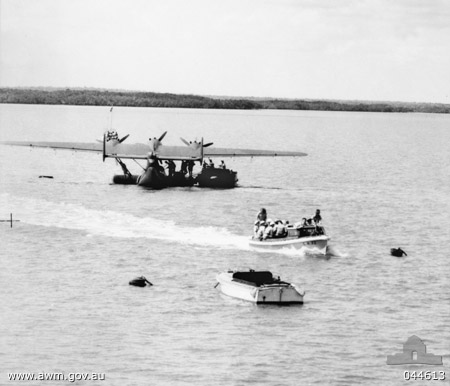
Crews with the Dutch Naval Aviation Service's Dornier Do 24 at Darwin Harbour, the Dornier Do 24 would be later attacked at Broome

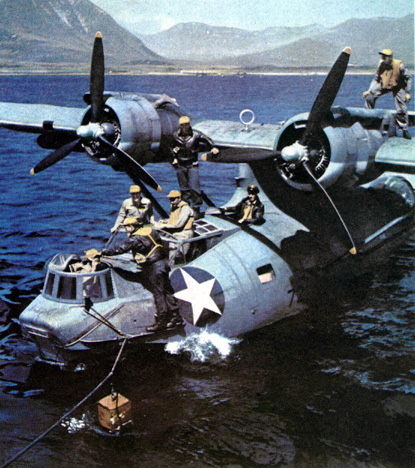
Typical US Navy PBY Catalina and crew during World War II

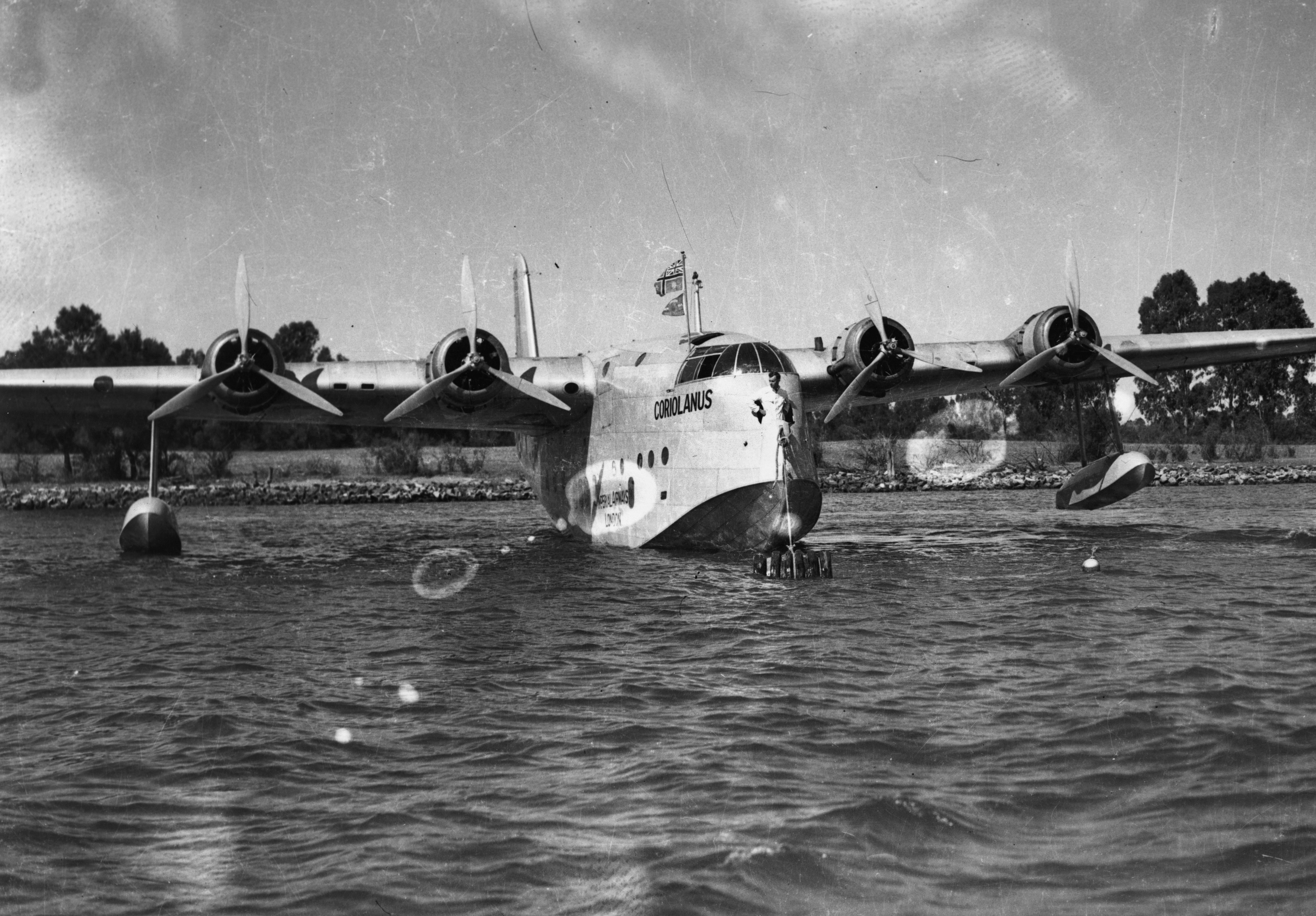
Corinna and Centaurus sister ship, Coriolanus Short Empire, S.23 flyingboat

Roebuck Bay Seaplane Base, also called Broome Seaplane Base, was located in Roebuck Bay Western Australia near the town of Broome. The base opened in March 1942 and operated Consolidated PBY Catalina seaplanes during World War II. The base was used by the United States Navy starting in 1942.

== History ==
Roebuck Bay, also called Broome Harbor, is a natural bay offering a protected port on Australia's northwestern shore. Following the loss of Naval Base Manila in the Philippines, the US seaplanes fled to the Dutch East Indies and then to Balikpapan, Indonesia until these ports were taken over by the Empire of Japan in March 1942. By December 19, 1941, ten PBY Catalinas were in Balikpapan: VP-101 had P-2, P-3, P-6, P-8, P-9, P-11 and VP-102 had P-23, p-25, P-26 P-2. The seaplanes at Roebuck Bay came from Surabaya, Java after Japan's occupation of Java in 1942. Parts of Patrol Squadrons VP-22, VP-101 and VP-102 of the U.S. Navy's Pat Wing 10 were operating from Roebuck Bay Seaplane Base. By the time the PBYs of Pat Wing 10 arrived at Roebuck Bay Seaplane Base about half of the planes had been lost. The base was also used by the Royal Netherlands Navy after departing Java, Royal Air Force and the Royal Australian Air Force. After the raid on March 3, 1942, PBY operations moved south to Seaplane Base Exmouth. USS Childs, a destroyer converted into a seaplane tender, was serving the planes at Roebuck Bay, but departed before the raid. Childs did leave behind a launch boat, that saved the lives of many during the raid. The motor schooner Nickolbay was at Roebuck Bay acting as a seaplane tender at the time of the raid. Nickolbay was the only transportation to survive the attack, as such transported some from Roebuck Bay to Port Hedland, about 300 miles south. Broome was attacked three more times by Japanese aircraft, but with not much damage. Broome Harbor had been a pearling port since 1883. Roebuck Bay and the Broome Airfield was used for 14 days before the raid by the Dutch as a refueling stop for planes evacuating Dutch East Indies refugee and troops to Perth. In those 14 days over 8,000 Dutch had passed through Broome. The Royal Australian Air Force and US Navy assisted the Dutch in the evacuations.

== March 3, 1942 raid ==
On March 3, 1942, at 9:20 AM nine A6M2 Zeros and a C5M2 plane strafed the seaplanes at the base. The tide was low so most of the planes were far from shore awaiting to be refueled. At the time only two US Navy PBY planes were at Roebuck Bay and no US crews were injured. In the raid 70 people killed and 24 aircraft were destroyed, 15 of the aircraft were flying boats at Roebuck Bay seaplane base. Some of these planes are still in the bay and can be seen about a mile offshore in low spring and king tides.

The United States Armed Forces operating the base at Broome thought the base was out of range of Japanese fighters based in Timor. But the planes used had extra fuel tanks added to make the attack. The town of Derby, Western Australia north of Roebuck Bay was also strafed on March 3, 1942.

=== Losses ===
Not one aircraft was operational at the end of the attack at 10.30 AM. The aircraft lost in the raid were:

- Five Dornier Do 24 of the Netherlands Naval Aviation Service (MLD)
- Four PBY Catalina of MLD, PBY-5
- Two PBY Catalina of the US Navy, PBY-4 # 6 and #7
- Two PBY Catalina of the Royal Air Force, landed from Singapore, by Tjilatjap, Java, PBY-5
- Two Short Empire, S.23 flyingboats, Both owned by Imperial Airways of (BOAC), one operated by Qantas and one operated by Royal Australian Air Force.
  - Details:
- Dornier Do 24K-1 Serial Number X-1 MLD was sunk.
- Dornier Do 24K-1 Serial Number X-20 MLD set on fire and sunk. From Lengkong, Tangerang, Banten landed before the attack at 9:00 AM.
- Dornier Do 24K-1 Serial Number X-23 MLD set on fire and sunk. From East Java, landed before the attack, crew and passengers were ashore, maintenance crew was checking plane.
- Short Empire, S.23, Corinna Empire Flying Boat Registration G-AEUC, the first plane to be sunk in the attack, operated by Qantas Empire Airways (QEA).
- Short Empire, S.23 Centaurus, Registration G-ADUT Serial Number A18-10, Short Empire, S.23 Centaurus a medium-range four-engined flying Qantas operated by Imperial Airways of London, the boat caught fire and sank, flight crew on board rescued.
- Two Royal Air Force PBY Catalina sunk
- Two Dutch Dornier Do 24 with the Dutch Royal Marine Airforce, with women and children were hit in the attack. About 35 to 40 Dutch civilians refugees were killed in the raid, they were on their way south to Naval Base Perth.
- Dutch and British PBYs were sunk also in the raid.
- B-24A Liberator Serial Number 40-2374 Number 74 was in the air, caught fire just after take-off when attacked and crashed into Roebuck Bay with some loss of life. One member Sgt. Melvin Donoho swam for 36 hours to shore, a distance of about 16 km (9.9 mi).
- At Broome airfield, two US Boeing B-17 Flying Fortress, Consolidated B-24 Liberator, Lockheed Lodestar and two Lockheed Hudson bombers were attacked and destroyed. A Netherlands East Indies Airline's (KNILM) DC-3 transports was destroyed also. All seven allied aircraft at the airfield were destroyed. There were no injuries at the airfield, as all were able to find cover.

== March 20, 1942 raid ==
On March 20, 1942 Mitsubishi G4M2 "Betty" medium bombers bombed the Broome Airfield. Attack killed one civilian and did minor damage to the airfield.

== Memorials ==
Raid memorials at Broome:

- There are four Broome air raid memorials in Broome:
  - Broome Air Raid Memorial, town center
  - Allied War Memorial Wall in Bedford Memorial Park, lists those known to have been lost
  - Broome Air Raid 50th Anniversary Memorial at Town Beach overlooking Roebuck Bay
  - Memorial to the 76 Dutch civilians lost and who were initially buried there, at Town Beach
- Dornier Do24K Engine from Royal Netherlands Air Force plane is on display at the Broome Historical Society museum
- Dornier Do24K Engines from Royal Netherlands Air Force plane is on display at the departure gate of Broome Airport

== See also ==
- Battle for Australia
- US Naval Advance Bases
- Naval Base Perth
- Air raids on Australia, 1942–1943
