= Naval Base Perth =

Former United States Navy Base in Perth, Western Australia

- Location within Australia
- Location: Western Australia
- Coordinates: 31.978814°S 115.820889°E

US Navy Seaplane Base Nedlands at Perth, Western Australia in 1943. US Navy Patrol Wing 10 working on Consolidated PBY Catalina at a hangar at Crawley Bay

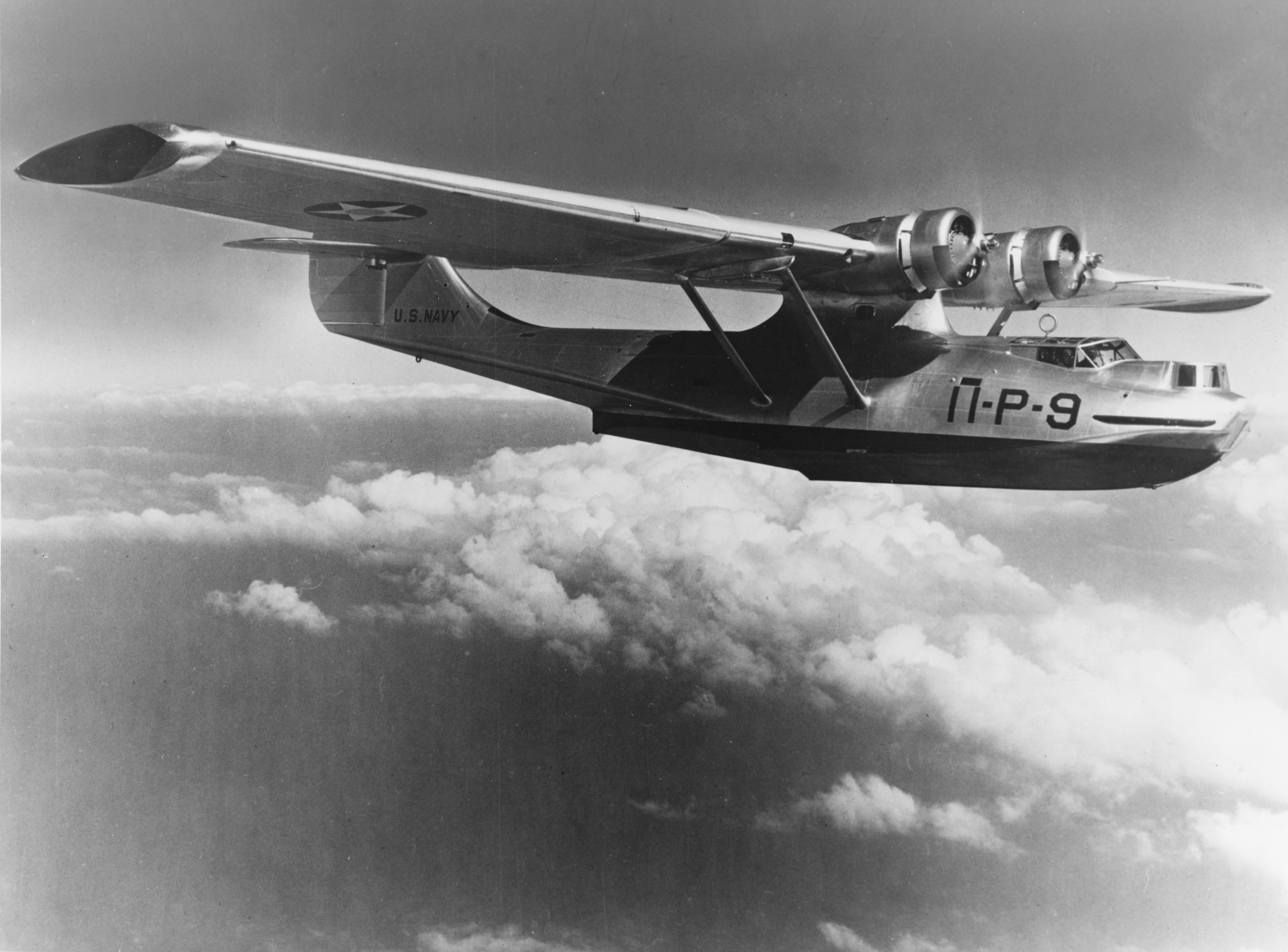
Consolidated PBY Catalina with the US Navy VP-11

Naval Base Perth was a United States Navy base near Perth, Western Australia during World War II. Perth was selected as the site for a U.S. Navy base as it was beyond the range of Japanese long-range bombers. The Bombing of Darwin on 19 February 1942 demonstrated a more southern port was needed. Both existing port facilities and new bases were built at Perth. Naval Base Perth's Fleet Post Office # was 255 SF Perth, Australia.

== Seaplane Base Nedlands ==
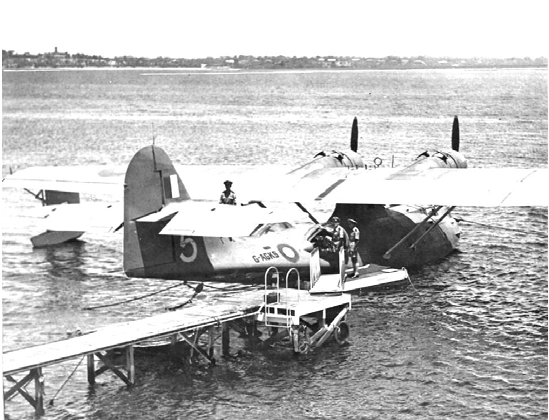
Double Sunrise Catalina G-AGKS at Nedlands in 1943

The US Navy performed search, combat, rescue, and reconnaissance patrols out of the Perth seaplane base at Crawley Bay (also called Matilda Bay). Out of the base, the US Navy operated 60 Consolidated PBY Catalina and Black Cat PBY that were painted black for night operations. Over 1200 personnel were stationed at the base. VPB-11, Patrol Bombing Squadron, arrived at Perth on June 8, 1943. The VPB-11 southwest Pacific operations were under the command of the FAW-10. On September 9, 1943, VPB-11 was moved to Naval Air Station Palm Island. The VP-101 arrived at Nedlands in December 1943. VP-102 and VP-21 arrived at Nedlands in March 1942. 26 October 1943: VP-33 arrived on October 26, 1943: VP-33 did day searches missions and night bombing (missions in Black Cat on Koepang and Amboina. VPB-29 arrived at Nedlands on November 9, 1942. VP-52 arrived on August 7, 1943. The seaplane base closed in July 1944 and the base moved to the Admiralty Islands. The Seaplane Base was located at the City of Nedlands, just west of Perth, on the north shore of the Swan River. The Double Sunrise air service also operated from the base.

=== Operation Flight Gridiron ===
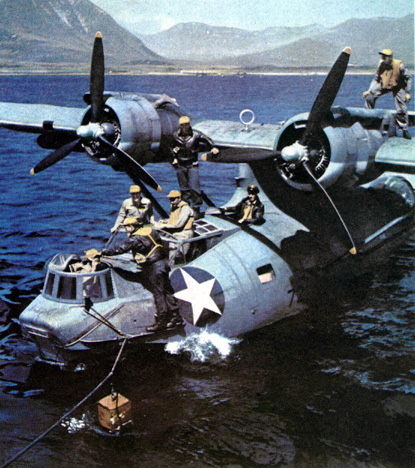
Typical PBY Catalina and crew during World War II

One of the longest rescue missions was done from Naval Base Perth by Lieutenant Deede out of Perth with Patrol Wing 10. Deede, Captain Thomas F. Pollock, and one other PBY Catalina flew to Corregidor in the Philippines and rescue 50 key personnel in April 1942. The rescue at US Corregidor Island Base was codenamed Operation Flight Gridiron. The trip was 5,201 kilometres (3,232 mi) one way. The PBYs also delivered medicine, Anti-aircraft nose fuses, and radio repair parts to the troops still on Corregidor. The troops on Corregidor did not surrender till May 6, 1942. The PBYs took of on April 27, 1942, and returned May 3, 1942. The first refuel was at Shark Bay by the USS William B. Preston (AVD-7). The next refuel was at Naval Base Darwin, where Qantas kindly refueled the planes. The cargo was loaded at Darwin and Lieutenant commander Edgar Neale joined the operation. Next fuelling was at Timor. The next spot was on Lake Lanao, just 826 kilometres (513 mi) from Corregidor. The planes made a risky night landing at 4:30 am on Lake Lanao successfully after US troops flashed a light the magic word to land. A navite banca, outrigger canoe, guided the planes to a place to hide under overhanging trees. The planes were fuelled by the troops there. The planes were lightened to prepare of the rescue. Removed were blankets, oxygen gear, spare food, and repair tools. The emergency rations we kept, but to remove weight, the plane's 50 calibre guns and ammunition were removed. On April 29, 1942, at 6:45 pm both planes took off for Corregidor. In the dark they were able to find Corregidor as oil tank burning on the island. The smoke even gave the crew the wind direction. The planes land at 11:20 pm and two US small craft came out to greet the planes and load the cargo into the boats. A large boat arrived and the three boats, unload cargo and arrived with the rescue personnel. The personnel included: Brigadier General, Major, Commander, Lieutenants, Lieutenant colone, Captain, wives and other troops. April 29, 1942, was Hirohito’s birthday, thus it is thought this is why the planes were able to land and take off without any attacks. The planes returned to Lake Lanao to rest and fuel. One plane took off, but the other with only one small tow boat had problems. In a gust of wind one plane hit a submerged reef and the plane started taking on water fast. The hole was plugged with clothes and some empty gas drums were roped to the tail to stop it from sinking. Then an empty gas drums raft was built and put under the starboard wing. The ground troops used marine glue to patch the two holes with a muslin cloth. A small water pump and bailing were used to clear the plane of water. The repairs and clearing of water was a long and difficult task, but at 4:00 pm the plane took off with the bailing party still working. Once in the air, the water drained out. The damaged plane landed in Darwin, and as soon as they landed, bailing started again. At Darwin, proper repair was done. After the repair the plane flew to Perth, 2,300 kilometres (1,400 mi) away landing at 1:30 am, the other plane was already there. The planes flew about 11,000 kilometres (7,000 mi), with 6,300 kilometres (3,900 mi) of those in Japan control airspace. Over 1,000 was flown without guns. The undamaged plane took 5 ½ days to complete the mission and the damaged plane 6 ½ days. The crew had long flights and little rest on the trip. All the flight personnel were awarded the Silver Star medal.

== Fremantle submarine base ==
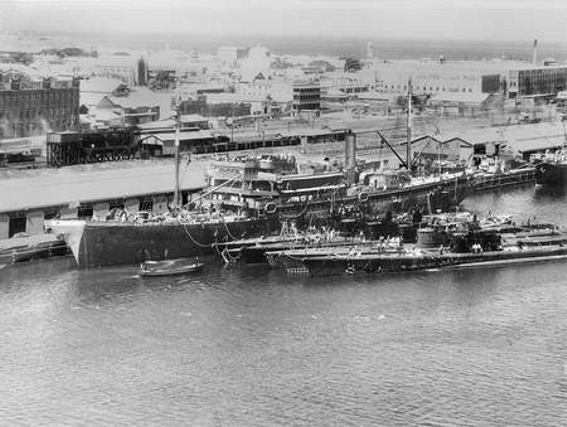
USS Holland with United States Navy submarines at Fremantle in March 1942

Southwest of the City of Perth at Fremantle Harbour the US built a larger submarine base, Fremantle submarine base, at the City of Fremantle about 3.2 kilometres (2 mi) from the coast. Fremantle submarine base opened on March 10, 1942. Most of the submarines at the base had escaped before Naval Base Manila in the Philippines before it was captured. The submarine operated out of the Dutch East Indies and then Indonesia until these ports were taken over. Fremantle submarine base was a wartime secret, to keep from being attacked as many of the South Pacific patrols operated out of the base. The base closed in September 1945. Fremantle's Fleet Post Office # was 137 SF Fremantle, Australia. Fremantle Fortress protected the base. Charles A. Lockwood was overseeing the bases at Fremantle and Exmouth Submarine Base. However, in August 1945, newspaper reports openly acknowledged the impact of the forces' activity.

=== Auxiliary Albany Submarine Base ===
Albany Submarine Base was founded on March 17, 1942, as a Fremantle Auxiliary Submarine Base at Port of Albany at Albany, Western Australia about 250 miles south of Perth when the submarine tender USS Holland (AS-3) arrived. If Japan attacked Fremantle the complete US Sub fleet could be sunk, so some of the US Subs operated out of Albany Submarine Base. In total 31 submarines were serviced at Albany Submarine Base during the war. Captain Fife started a torpedo target range at Albany in Princess Royal Harbour. A net was set up and the USS Skipjack (SS-184) was used to test Mark 14 torpedo at the net. Port of Albany offered excellent fleet anchorage and Princess Royal Fortress. USS Pelias took over submarine tender duty in July 1942, then was replaced by the USS Fulton (AS-11). Existing port facilities were used, subs were tied to the Albany jetty and a quarantine station was used for the HQ and station. The base was moved to Naval Base Brisbane in August 1942 to prepare for the support of the Guadalcanal campaign. Submarines returned to Port of Albany during the Western Australian emergency of March 1944 out of fear of an attack on Fremantle. The Royal Australian Navy operated a large refuelling tank farm at Albany.

== Port of Perth ==
Port of Perth offered excellent fleet anchorage. The Port of Perth is on the wide deep mouth of the Swan River at the City of Perth, about 16 kilometres (10 mi) inland from the sea. The existing port facilities at Port of Perth were large enough to support the needs of the US Navy. Most US Navy activity was at Fremantle, 13 kilometres (8 mi) away from the port. USS ARD-9, a US Navy auxiliary floating drydock, was at Perth for repairing ships and subs in January 1944, then departed to Naval Base Milne Bay. Some US ships that ported at Perth during World War II: USS Augusta (CA-31), USS Tucker (DD-374), and SS Mariposa.

== Airfields ==
- Maylands Airport for Royal Navy and U.S. Navy
- Perth Airport
- Middle Swan Airfield for Royal Navy and U.S. Navy
  - Satellite fields: Beverley, Bindoon, Gingin North and Mooliabeenie.

== Loses ==
- The Balao-class submarine USS Bullhead departed the Fremantle submarine base on July 31, 1945, and was sunk by Japanese aircraft in the Java Sea, August 6, 1945, the last US vessel sunk by Japan in the war.

=== USS Langley (CV-1) ===
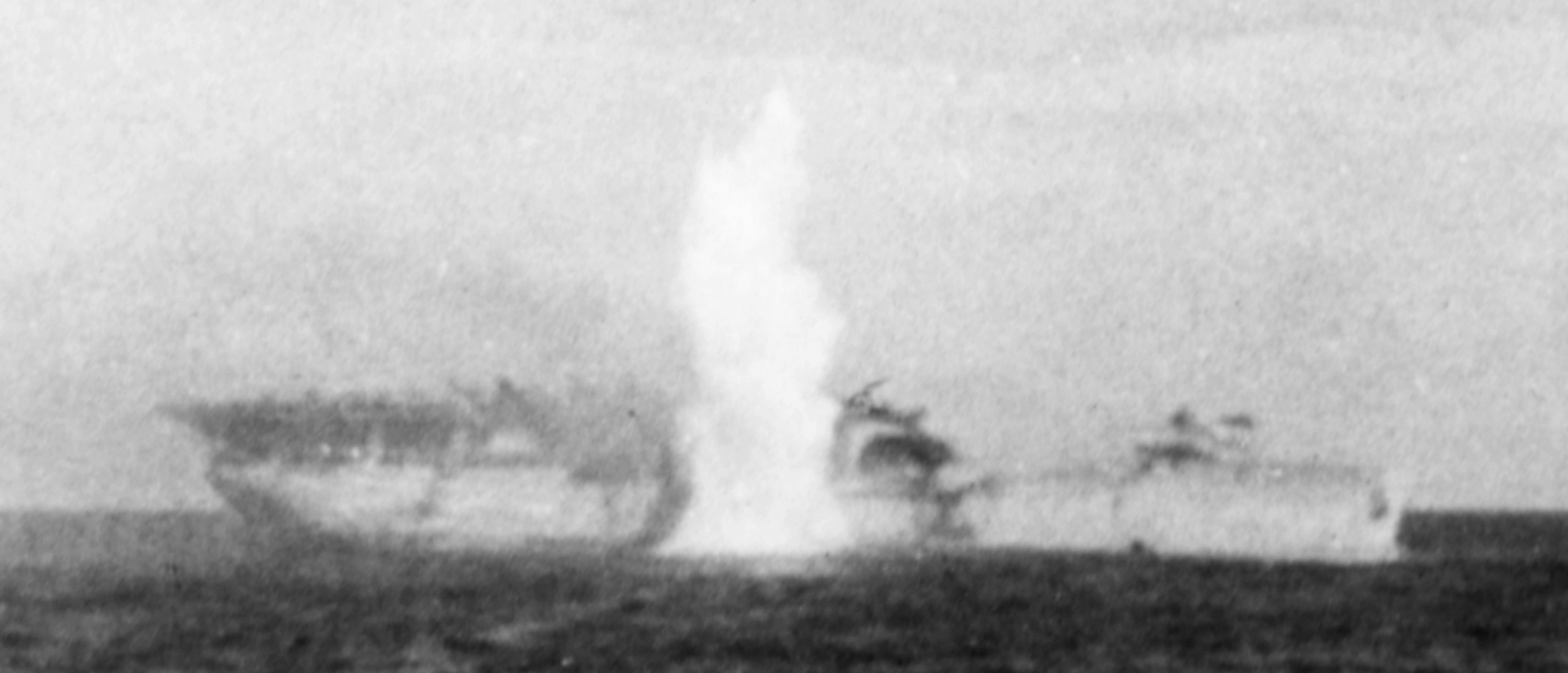
USS Langley scuttled via torpedo on 27 February 1942 off Java, after departing Perth

To fight the Empire of Japan in Java, 43 Curtiss P-40 Warhawk from Amberley, New Zealand and Bankstown Airport were ordered to fly to Perth to be loaded on the USS Langley (CV-1), the US's first aircraft carrier. The planes landed on Maylands airfield and were towed to the Base at Fremantle. Of the 43 planes sent, only 32 were loaded onto the USS Langley on February 21/22, 1942. The planes were part of the Far East Air Force's 13th Pursuit Squadron. The plane on the USS Langley were to become the 49th Pursuit Group. United States Army Air Forces P-40 pilots and P-40 ground crews also boarded the USS Langley. USS Langley join convoy MS.5 and departed Perth on February 22. On February 27, 1942, on her way to Java, nine twin-engine Japanese bombers attacked the USS Langley off of Tilatjap. The USS Langley was heavily damaged, the crew abandoned the ship and she was scuttled by her escort ships.

=== Vought Kingfisher ===
On September 12, 1943, a US Navy Vought OS2U Kingfisher No. 2283 with the Scouting Squadron Sixty-One, VS-61, was doing engine test flight. During the test problems appeared and the plane turned upside down and nose-dived into the Swan River. The plane exploded sank killed the two crew members, pilot and Radio-operator. The plane had taken off from the Maylands Airfield.

== Post war ==
- Allied Submarine Plaque. On March 20, 1995, a memorial plaque place to commemorate the submarine base.
- Perth War Cemetery and Annex, Australian Army founded in 1942. First used for those that died at Hollywood Military Hospital.
- Western Australia Aviation Museum at Bull Creek.
  - US Submarine USS Bullhead (SS-332) memorial at the Western Australia Aviation Museum. USS Bullhead was the last US Naval vessel, to be lost in World War II, with 84 crew.
- A large memorial to lost Fremantle submariners was built by the periscope project Fremantle War Memorial.
- Memorial Day for US US submariners at Perth is held.

== See also ==
- Fortress Fremantle
- US Naval Advance Bases
- Exmouth Submarine Base
- Roebuck Bay Seaplane Base
- US Naval Base Australia
