= Exmouth Submarine Base =

Former United States Navy Base

Location of Exmouth Submarine Base in Western Australia
United States Navy from 1942 to 1943.

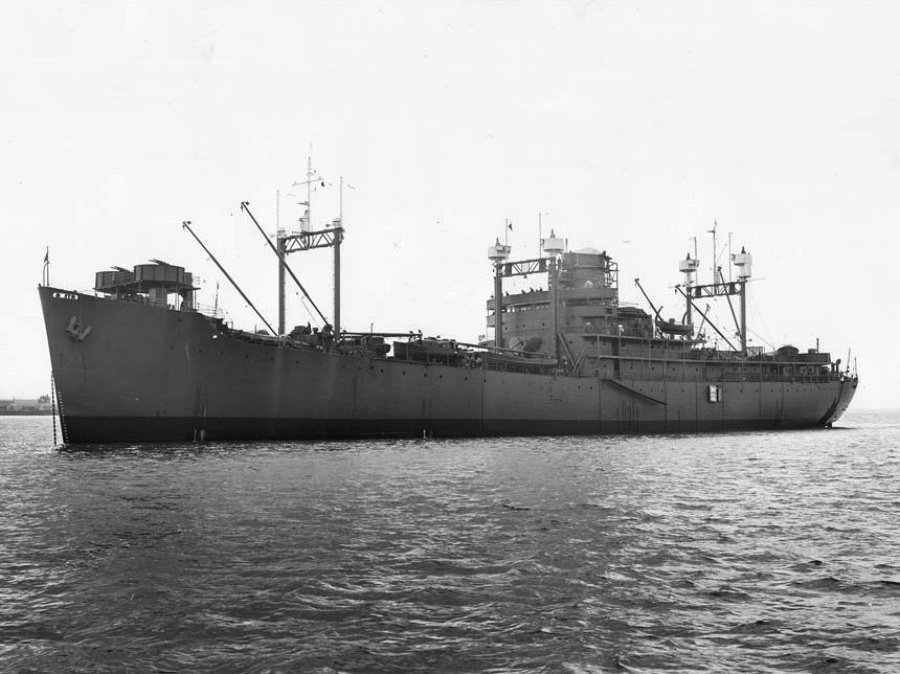
USS Pelias submarine tender base at Exmouth Submarine Base

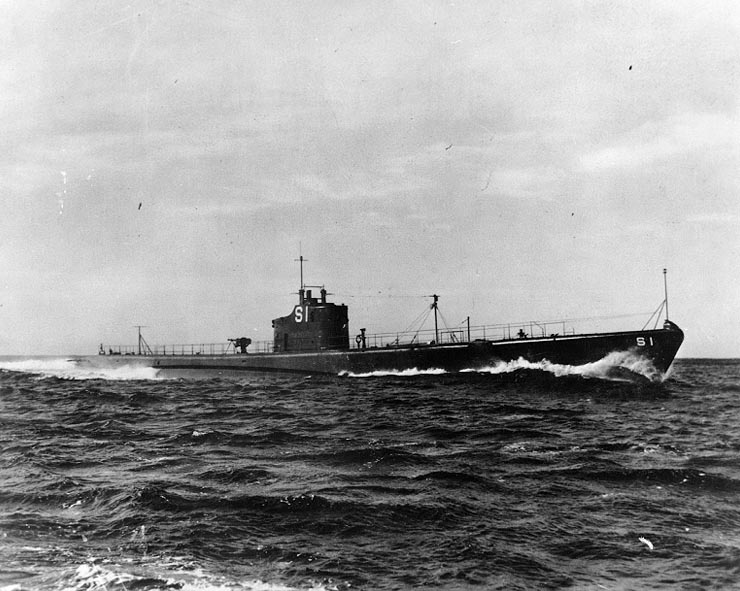
USS Salmon (SS-182) one of many subs serviced at Exmouth Submarine Base

Exmouth Submarine Base, called Operation Potshot, was a United States Navy base at Exmouth Gulf, Western Australia during World War II. Exmouth Gulf on western Australia was selected as the site for a US Naval base as it was thought at the time to be out of the reach of Empire of Japan's long-range bombers. Bombing of Darwin on February 19, 1942, demonstrated that a more southern port was needed. The submarine operation at Exmouth Gulf and the North West Cape was called Operation Potshot, named after the Potshot airfield that provided fighter plane cover for the base.

== History ==
With the loss of Naval Base Manila in the Philippines, US submarines fled to Dutch East Indies and then Indonesia until these ports were taken over. This forced the US Submarine Fleet to Australian ports out of bomber range. A submarine base was set up in Exmouth Gulf. To support the submarines, submarine tender USS Pelias was stationed at Exmouth Gulf at Exmouth, Western Australia. A 500-ton Type B barge was stationed at the base to refuel the subs. Oil tankers would refill the barge as needed. A rest camp for the crew was set up at the base. Potshot airfield, near Yanrey, was also called Learmonth Airport of the Royal Australian Air Force (RAAF). For added defense, a British GLll radar station was installed. The base had Australian 3-inch anti-aircraft guns and QF 3.7-inch anti-aircraft guns installed. The US installed Bofors gun anti-aircraft guns. A US Naval Communication Station was built at the site. While it was thought that Exmouth Gulf was far enough south to be out of range for an attack, on May 20 and 21, 1943, that base was attacked. Charles A. Lockwood was overseeing the bases at Fremantle and Exmouth. Exmouth Gulf was too north for a base, as it was hit by cyclones. Exmouth was used as part of the staging for Operation Transom in May 1944.

== 1943 raids ==
On May 20, 1943, two Japanese Betty bombers were first spotted by the radar station at Onslow, just north of Exmouth Gulf. Then spotted by the radar station at Exmouth Gulf. At about 10.55 pm, the Japanese planes bombed Exmouth Gulf, but hit nothing. Two RAAF CAC Boomerang planes of No. 85 Squadron RAAF tried to intercept the bombers, but did not find them. On May 21, 1943, again, the two radar stations spotted two Japanese aircraft. The two planes dropped nine bombs into the Exmouth Gulf at about midnight, again hitting nothing. Again, two Boomerangs were sent up, but by the time one plane found a bomber, it was low on fuel and had to return to base. Other raids hit close to the radar station at Exmouth Gulf. On 15 May 1943, Onslow was bombed by Japan when a single bomber, bombed the Onslow airfield with no damage done.

== Seaplane Base Exmouth ==
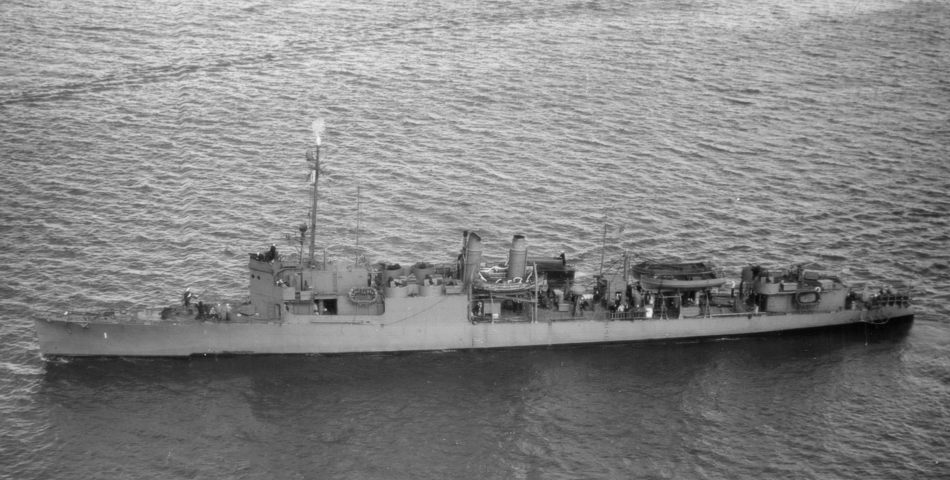
USS Childs (AVD-1) in 1944

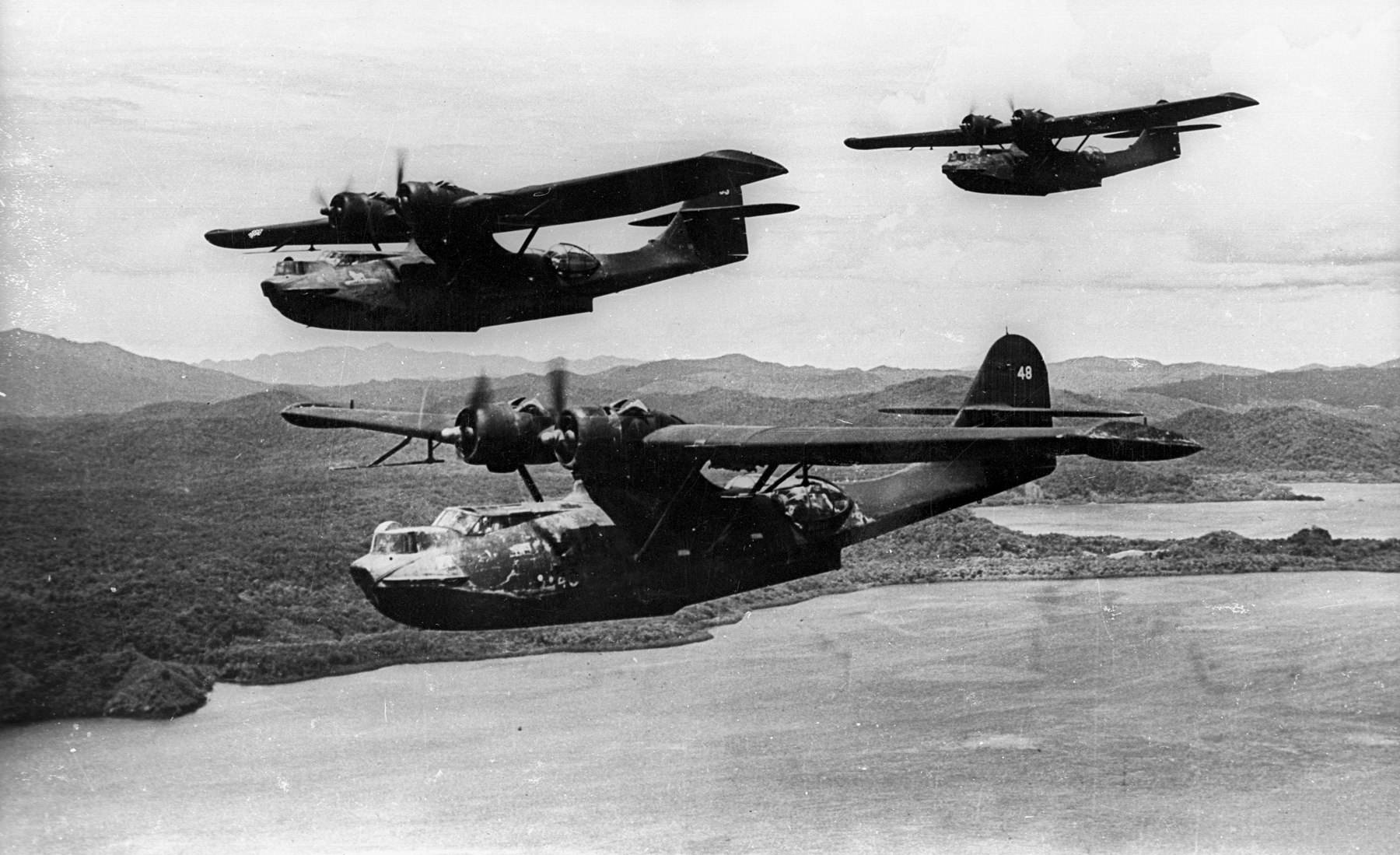
VPB-52 Consolidated PBY Catalina in 1943

The US Navy set up a seaplane base at Exmouth Gulf, called Advance Base D that operated two squadrons of Consolidated PBY Catalina flying boats. US Navy squadrons VPB-33 and VPB-52 operated out of the base. The planes were serviced by the USS Childs), a destroyer that became a seaplane tender. The Double Sunrise airline service also operated from the base. The PBY Catalina did search, combat, rescue, and reconnaissance patrols. On November 26, 1942, PBY-5A # 2407 aborted a take-off at Exmouth, the plane hit a large swell. The front bombing window broke, and water poured in. The plane sank in 18 feet (5.5 m), the captain was killed, and eight others were injured. On April 28, 1943, a PBY crashed at Exmouth, killing three in the plane. On July 3, 1943, PBY #08294 crashed in Exmouth Gulf, killing four crew members and eight passengers. The plane was not repairable.

== Z Special Unit ==
Exmouth submarine base was used as a staging base for Z Special Unit. Z Special Unit was special forces use made up of British, Australian, Dutch, New Zealand, Timorese and Indonesian and a few American troops that operated in Southeast Asia behind Japanese lines. The operation was mostly for reconnaissance and sabotage work. From Potshot Z, Special Unit started Operation Jaywick, a successful raid on Japanese shipping in Singapore Harbour, in September 1943.

Operation Rimau also used the base for staging, but the operation was unsuccessful, with all team members killed as the Japanese found them before the raid. Six Z Special crew members killed have streets in Exmouth named after them.

== Post war ==
- Operation Potshot Memorial Plaque was built in 1963 near the Potshot reconnaissance site.

== See also ==
- US Naval Advance Bases
- Naval Base Perth
- Roebuck Bay Seaplane Base
- US Naval Base Australia
