= Admiral Wagner =

Admiral Wagner may refer to:

- Elaine C. Wagner (fl. 1980s–2010s), U.S. Navy rear admiral
- Frank D. Wagner (admiral) (1893–1966), U.S. Navy vice admiral
- Gerhard Wagner (admiral) (1898–1987), West German Navy rear admiral
