= VP-102 =

Patrol Squadron 102
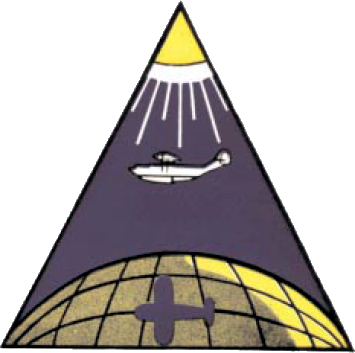
- VP-102 insignia
- Active: 1 September 1937 - 18 April 1942
- Country: United States of America
- Branch: United States Navy
- Type: Squadron
- Role: Maritime patrol
- Nickname(s): Tridents

Aircraft flown
- Patrol: P2Y-3; PBY-1/4 Catalina
- Transport: O3U-3 Corsair

VP-102 was a Patrol Squadron of the U.S. Navy. It was established as VP-18 on 1 September 1937, redesignated as VP-13 on 1 July 1939, redesignated as VP-26 on 11 December 1939, redesignated as VP-102 on 16 December 1940 and disestablished on 18 April 1942.

== Operational history ==
- 1 September 1937–January 1938: VP-18 was established at NAS Seattle, Wash., by CNO and BuAer for administrative purposes. Formation of the squadron proceeded slowly, with official establishment ceremonies being held on 15 December 1937. The squadron did not receive its first aircraft until 15 January 1938, when 15 P2Y-3 seaplanes were transferred from VP-4. One, possibly two, PBY-1 aircraft were also part of the squadron complement for conversion training when more of the Catalinas became available. Although located at NAS Seattle during its formation, VP-18 came under the operational control of Patrol Wing-2, located at Naval Station Pearl Harbor, Hawaii.
- 25 March 1938: Aircraft of Patrol Wing 2 participated in Fleet Exercise XIX (Phase V) as part of Red Force operating against Blue Force. VP-18 flew in from NAS Seattle with its P2Y-3 aircraft to participate in the problem. This exercise illustrated the extreme vulnerability of slow patrol aircraft to modern anti-aircraft protective screens, with the majority of the participating aircraft judged shot down by Blue Force. One aircraft of VP-18 ditched during the exercises with none of the crew recovered. Upon completion of the fleet exercises the squadron returned to Seattle.
- 15 September 1938: VP-18 was transferred from NAS Seattle to NAS San Diego, California, still under the operational control of Patrol Wing 2.
- 4 November 1938: The squadron's aging P2Y-3 seaplanes and PBY-1 aircraft were turned in for 12 replacement PBY-4 seaplanes fresh from the factory. During this period the squadron was also assigned an O3U-3 Corsair for utility purposes.
- 5 September 1939: VP-13 flew a trans-Pacific from San Diego to NAS Pearl Harbor, Hawaii, it new permanent home base. At that time, the squadron operated with a complement of 14 PBY-4 aircraft.
- 9 April 1940: The squadrons of Patrol Wing 2 participated in Fleet Exercise XXI with the Army's 72nd Bombardment Squadron and 4th Reconnaissance Squadron in the defense of the Hawaiian Islands against attack by the opposing forces. Deficiencies in coordination between Army and Navy squadrons were noted, particularly in the area of communications.
- 16 December 1940: VP-26 was redesignated VP-102 and relocated from its home base at Pearl Harbor to Cavite, Philippines. The relocation placed the squadron under the operational control of Patrol Wing 10, Asiatic Fleet.
- 8 December 1941: VP-101 and VP-102 of Patrol Wing 10 were dispersed to the southern Philippines upon notification that hostilities had commenced. They were accompanied by tenders USS Childs, USS William B. Preston, USS Heron and USS Langley.
- 14–23 December 1941: Seven VP-102 aircraft were destroyed at Olongapo seadrome, Philippines, during a surprise attack. The remaining aircraft joined the two surviving VP-101 aircraft at Cavite, Philippines, in a move to Balikpapan, Borneo, arriving on 18 December 1941. Combat attrition reduced the numbers of available Patrol Wing 10 aircraft, requiring the merger of VP-101 assets into VP-102 at Ambon on 23 December 1941.
- 26 December 1941: The six remaining aircraft of Patrol Wing 10 carried out an attack on a Japanese surface formation near Jolo, Philippines. Two aircraft returned to Ambon Island after the action. Some of the survivors from three of the aircraft shot down during the attack were later able to rejoin the squadron in Australia.
- 14 February 1942: The remnants of Patrol Wing-10, a total of four PBYs out of the original 45 aircraft, assembled at the port of Darwin, Australia, after fighting rear-guard actions from Ende, Flores Island, and Kupang, Timor Island. On this date an attack by Japanese fighters on the port destroyed one more PBY-4 in the harbor.
- March–7 April 1942: The last three surviving Catalinas of Patrol Wing 10 were flown to Seaplane Base Nedlands, Perth, Australia. Sixty percent of the wing personnel were either dead or captives of the Japanese. On 7 April 1942, the Patrol Wing was reinforced by VP-21 from Pearl Harbor.
- 18 April 1942: VP-102 was disestablished at Perth, Australia.

== Home port assignments ==
The squadron was assigned to these home ports, effective on the dates shown:

- NAS Seattle – 1 September 1937
- NAS San Diego – 15 September 1938
- Naval Station Pearl Harbor – 5 September 1939
- Naval Station Cavite – 16 December 1940

== Aircraft assignment ==
The squadron first received the following aircraft on the dates shown:

- P2Y-3 – January 1938
- PBY-1 Catalina – January 1938
- PBY-4 Catalina – November 1938
- O3U-3 Corsair – November 1938

== See also ==
- Maritime patrol aircraft
- List of inactive United States Navy aircraft squadrons
- List of United States Navy aircraft squadrons
- List of squadrons in the Dictionary of American Naval Aviation Squadrons
- History of the United States Navy
