= USS Pelias =

Tender of the United States Navy

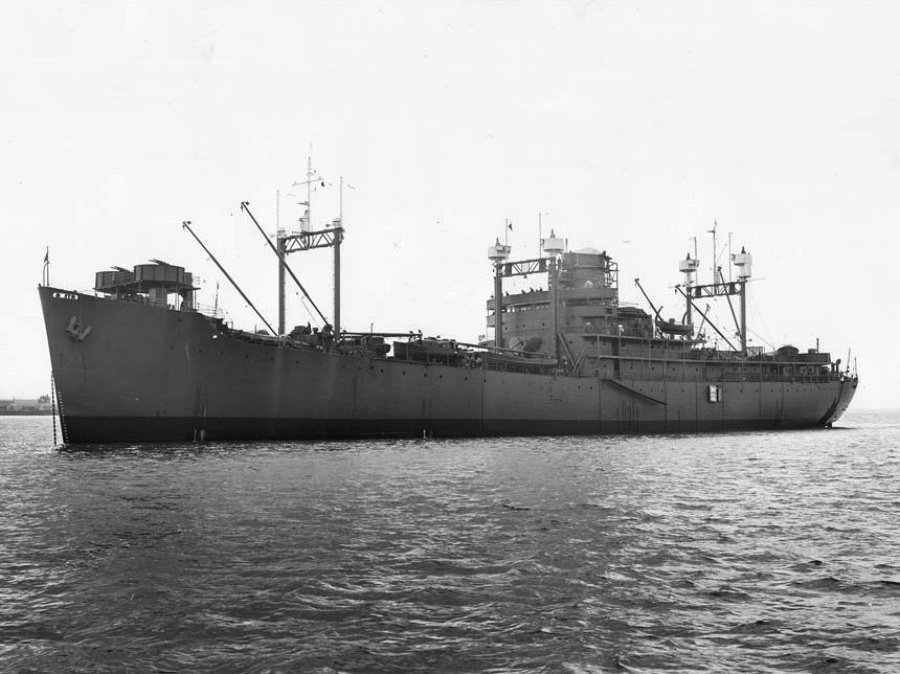
- USS Pelias on 15 November 1941

History

United States
- Namesake: Pelias
- Builder: Sun Shipbuilding & Dry Dock Company, Chester, Pennsylvania; Converted by Bethlehem Steel Company, Brooklyn, New York
- Launched: 8 May 1939
- Acquired: 1940
- Commissioned: 5 September 1941
- Decommissioned: 14 June 1970
- Stricken: 1 August 1972
- Fate: Disposed of, sold by Defense Reutilization and Marketing Service (DRMS) for scrapping, 1 October 1973

General characteristics
- Class & type: Converted Type C3 ship / Griffin-class submarine tender
- Displacement: 8,236 (It.)
- Length: 492 ft (150 m)
- Beam: 69.5 ft (21.2 m)
- Draft: 21 ft (6.40 m)
- Propulsion: 8,500hp diesel, 1 shaft (details)
- Speed: 16.5 knots (30.6 km/h; 19.0 mph)
- Complement: 925
- Armament: one single 5"/38 DP gun mount; one single 3 in (76 mm) DP gun mount; four 0.5 in (12.7 mm) machine guns

USS Pelias (AS–14) was a Griffin-class submarine tender in service with the United States Navy from 1941 to 1970.

== History ==
Pelias was laid down as SS Mormacyork under Maritime Commission contract by Sun Shipbuilding and Dry Dock Co., Chester, Pennsylvania, 8 May 1939; launched 14 November 1939; sponsored by Miss Barbara W. Vickery; and delivered to Moore-McCormick Steamship Co., 1 April 1940. Mormacyork served for a short time on passenger service between ports in the United States and South America. Acquired by the Navy late in 1940, she was renamed Pelias 9 January 1941 and converted for Navy use as a submarine tender by Bethlehem Steel Co., Brooklyn, N.Y. Pelias commissioned at New York 5 September 1941.

=== World War II ===
Following shakedown off New England, Pelias sailed for the Pacific 9 October 1941. Steaming via San Diego, California, she arrived Pearl Harbor 21 November 1941 as the tender for Submarine Squadron Six. Six days later she began sub overhauls at the Submarine Base where she was berthed during the Japanese attack 7 December 1941. During the sneak attack her guns splashed one enemy torpedo plane, and damaged a second, as they made their deadly runs along the main channel little more than 100 yards from her port side. She resumed repair duty shortly after the attack and during the early months of the war provided valuable assistance as the United States Pacific Fleet prepared for the long struggle for supremacy of the Pacific.

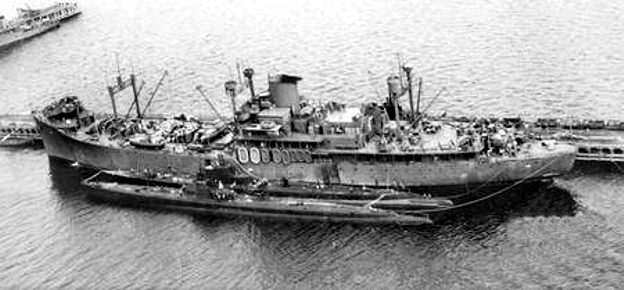
Pelias with submarines in Australia, circa 1943

After servicing almost a score of submarines at Pearl Harbor, Pelias steamed to San Francisco late in May 1942 and took on spare parts, provisions, and ammunition. Departing for the Southwest Pacific 22 June 1942, she touched at Melbourne, Australia, 16 July and reached Albany, Australia, the 23d. Assigned to duty under Rear Admiral Charles A. Lockwood, ComSubSoWesPac, she refitted the 10 submarines of Submarine Squadron 6 at Albany before shifting her base to Fremantle, Western Australia, 27 October. There, she relieved Holland as mother ship for the SoWesPac submarines, which pressed the attack against Japanese naval and merchant shipping. Except for brief deployments to Exmouth Gulf in May 1943 and to Albany in March 1944, Pelias operated out of Fremantle during her Australian employment. Between July 1942 and May 1944 she overhauled, repaired, and refitted 59 submarines of Submarine Squadrons 6, 12, and 16.

Ordered home in May 1944, she departed Fremantle 15 May 1944, touched at Pearl Harbor 6 June and reached San Francisco the 15th. For more than two months she underwent overhaul at Mare Island Naval Shipyard; thence, from 10 to 18 September, she steamed to Hawaii. Engine repairs delayed her deployment to Midway, but they did not hinder her sub-tending duties. She refitted 7 subs before sailing to Midway 9 January 1945. Assigned to Submarine Squadron 32, Pelias completed 15 sub refits and voyage repairs during the next four months. Between 26 May and 10 June she steamed via Pearl to San Diego where she undertook the repair and decommissioning overhaul of the S-class submarines of Submarine Squadron 45.

=== Cold War ===
Based at San Diego when hostilities ended 15 August, Pelias steamed to Tiburon Bay 10 September 1945, thence to Mare Island 24 February 1946. She was placed in commission in reserve 6 September 1946, and in service in reserve 1 February 1947. On 21 March 1950 she was placed out of service in reserve, but later performed berthing ship duty at Mare Island until she decommissioned 14 June 1970.

Pelias received one battle star for World War II service. The ship's bell is currently on display at Cerritos College in Norwalk, California.
