= USS Childs =

Clemson-class destroyer

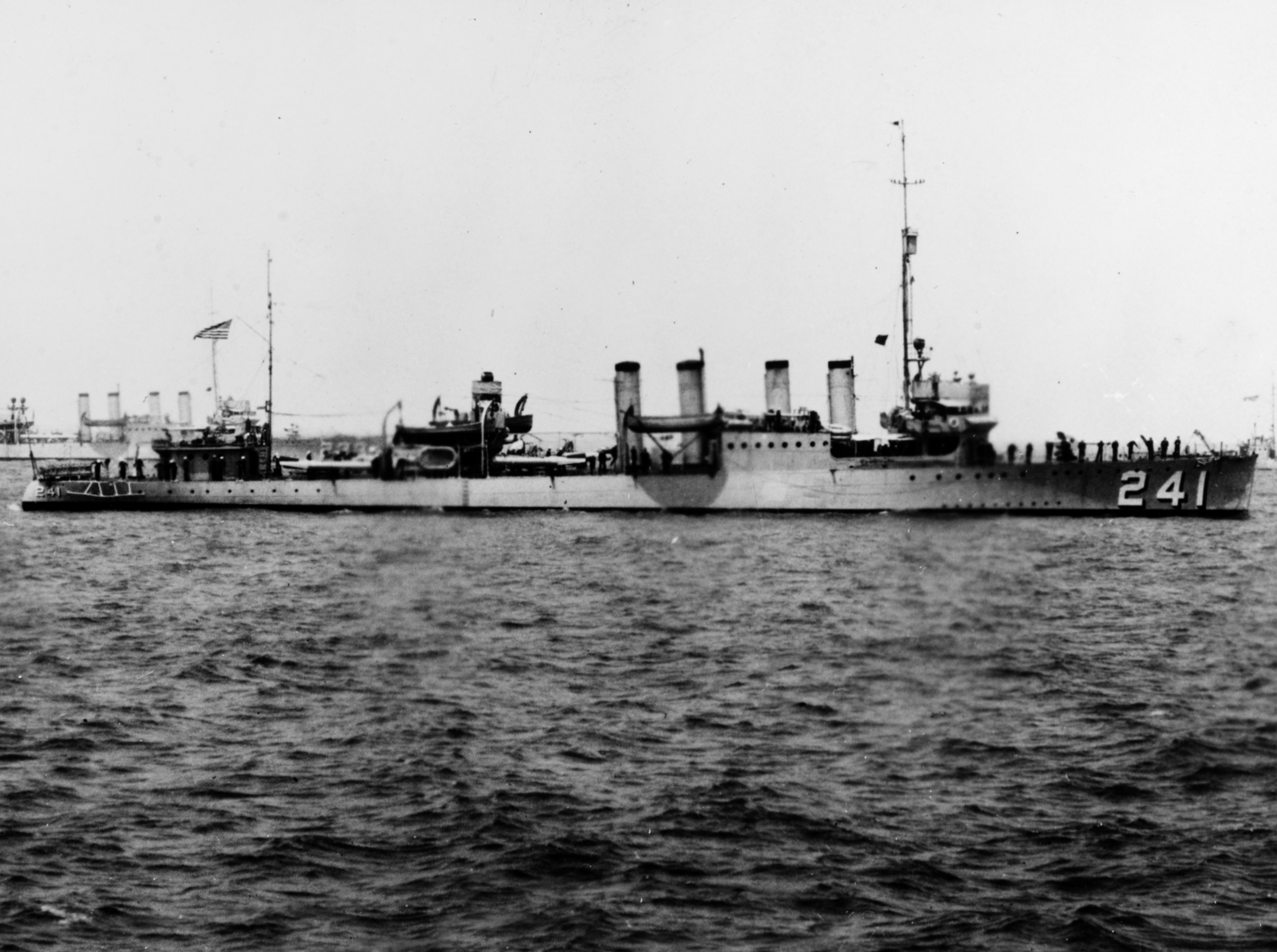
- USS Childs in 1927

History

United States
- Namesake: Earle W. F. Childs
- Builder: New York Shipbuilding
- Laid down: 19 March 1919
- Launched: 15 September 1920
- Commissioned: 22 October 1920
- Decommissioned: 10 December 1945
- Stricken: 3 January 1946
- Fate: Sold for scrap, 23 May 1946

General characteristics
- Class & type: Clemson-class destroyer
- Displacement: 1,215 tons
- Length: 314 feet 4 inches (95.81 m)
- Beam: 31 feet 8 inches (9.65 m)
- Draft: 9 feet 10 inches (3.00 m)
- Propulsion: 26,500 shp (20 MW); geared turbines, 2 screws
- Speed: 35 knots (65 km/h)
- Range: 4,900 nautical miles (9,100 kilometres); @ 15 kt
- Complement: 137 officers and enlisted
- Armament: 4 x 4 in (100 mm) guns, 1 x 3 in (76 mm) gun, 12 x 21 inch (533 mm) tt.

USS Childs (DD-241/AVP-14/AVD-1) was a Clemson-class destroyer in service with the United States Navy from 1920 to 1945. She was scrapped in 1946.

== Namesake ==
Earle Wayne Freed Childs was born on 1 August 1893 in Philadelphia, Pennsylvania. He was a member of the United States Naval Academy class of 1915. He married Miss Gertrude Boucher on June 27, 1917, attending his wedding with his head bandaged from a car accident in that morning while driving in a storm. He had been cut by flying glass from the windshield.

Graduating from the Naval Academy as an ensign, he was assigned to the USS Culgoa, a refrigerated supply ship. His next assignment was to the USS Celtic another refrigerated supply ship. In June 1916 he was assigned to the cruiser USS Montana.

Promoted to Lieutenant, he served in World War I on the submarine USS L-2. However, while serving as an observer on the British submarine HMS H5, Childs was killed on March 2, 1918, when the H5 was mistaken for a German U-boat by a British merchant ship off the coast of Wales. The SS Rutherglen deliberately rammed the H 5, sending the submarine to the bottom with the loss of its entire crew.

== History ==
Childs (DD-241) was launched 15 September 1920 by New York Shipbuilding Corporation; sponsored by Mrs. E. W. F. Childs; and commissioned 22 October 1920.

Arriving at Gibraltar 14 February 1921, Childs joined U.S. Naval Forces, Europe, to cruise in the Mediterranean, Adriatic, North, and Baltic Seas until 25 November, when she arrived at Constantinople. Here she joined the relief mission sent to Russia early in 1922, remaining in the Black Sea on diplomatic duties until 1 April. On 8 July, she departed from Cherbourg for Philadelphia, returning to the United States 29 July.

Childs conducted training operations, and joined other ships in fleet exercises along the Atlantic coast and in the Caribbean until 14 February 1925, when with the Scouting Fleet she stood out of Guantanamo Bay for large scale fleet exercises in the Hawaiian Islands and then returned to the U.S. East Coast. On 6 April 1929, she collided with the American four-masted schooner A. Ernest Mills in the Atlantic Ocean off North Carolina; the schooner sank.

In 1932, 1933, and 1934, the annual concentration of the Fleet for battle practice was again held on the West Coast, and Childs took part. With her home port changed to San Diego, California 9 November Childs served as flagship of Destroyer Division 8 Rotating Reserve, Scouting Force, 5 January-15 June when she was in full commission again. She spent the summer of 1935 cruising off the Pacific Northwest and Alaska.

The next year Childs returned to the east coast for overhaul, then returned to duty at San Diego, cruising several times to the Hawaiian Islands before 14 May 1938, when she cleared for Philadelphia and conversion to a seaplane tender. Reclassified AVP-14, she saw her first service in her new role during the annual fleet problem of 1939, operating between the Florida coast and San Juan, Puerto Rico, and after final preparations at Philadelphia, sailed for her new base at Pearl Harbor, arriving 29 June. She tended seaplanes there and on the plane guard stations off Midway, Wake Island, and Guam until 1 October 1940, when she was reclassified AVD-1, and ordered to the Asiatic Station. The next day she left Hawaii for Cavite, Philippines, arriving 1 November to begin her service to air patrol squadrons.

== World War II ==
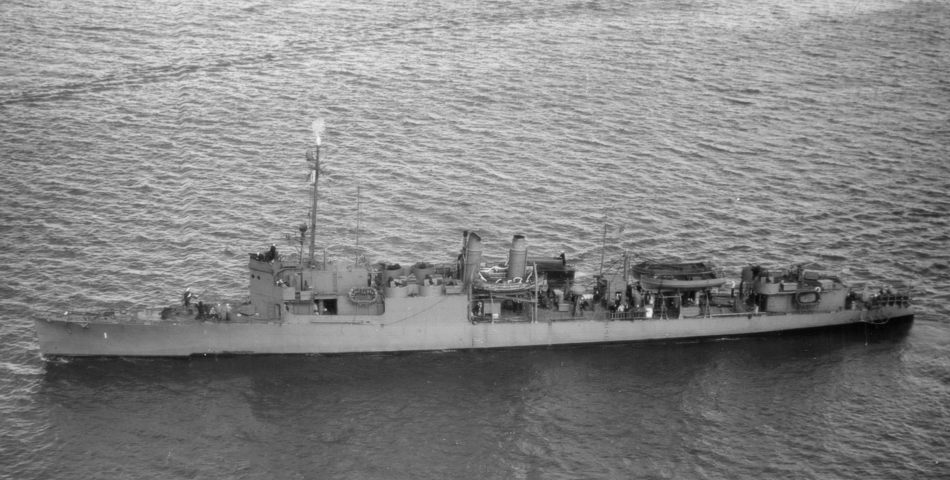
USS Childs in 1944.

When war with Japan broke out, Childs lay in Cavite Navy Yard for repair, and during the devastation of the yard by Japanese aircraft on 10 December 1941, escaped damage by evasive maneuvering in the confined harbor area. She tended her flying boats of Patrol Wing 10 from Manila for 4 more days, then began a lengthy base-to-base withdrawal. On leaving Kendari harbour on 24 January 1942 she evaded the invading Japanese fleet in a rain squall and survived an air attack. At Surabaya the tenders Childs, Heron, and Preston rotated as needed to service VP101 which was patrolling Makassar Strait. Finally she reached Seaplane Base Exmouth, at Exmouth Gulf, Australia, 28 February 1942. From Fremantle and other Western Australia ports, Childs continued her tender duties until 12 August 1944. During this time, her planes scouted and bombed Japanese positions and shipping, mined the waters off Balikpapan, Borneo, and performed air-sea rescue missions.

Childs returned to the west coast 19 September 1944, and after overhaul, conducted training operations off the west coast until the close of the war. She was decommissioned 10 December 1945, and sold 3 January 1946.

Childs received one battle star for World War II service.
