= USS William B. Preston =

Clemson-class destroyer

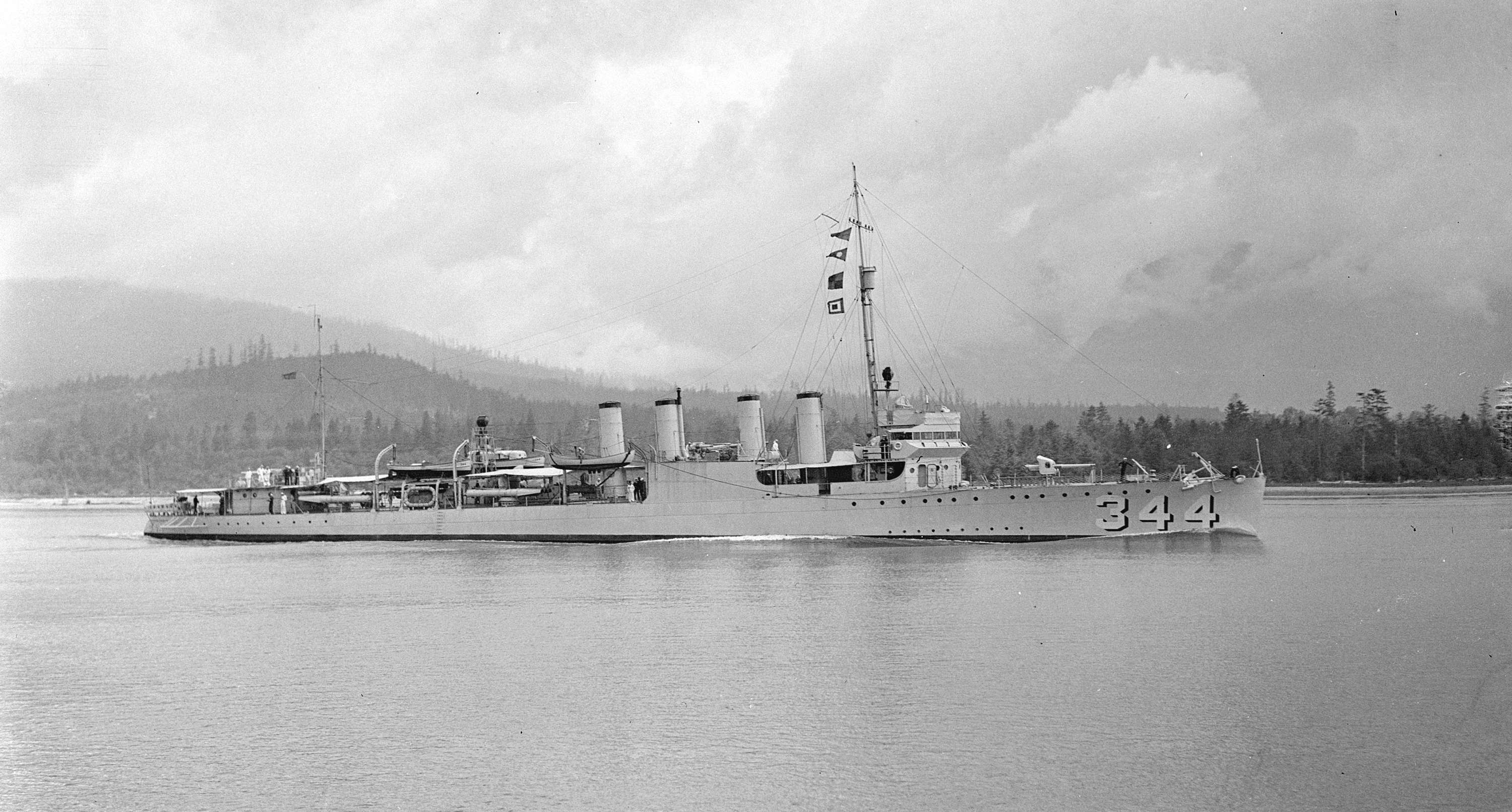
- USS William B. Preston at Vancouver in June 1933.

History

United States
- Namesake: William B. Preston
- Builder: Norfolk Navy Yard, Portsmouth, Virginia
- Laid down: 18 November 1918
- Launched: 9 August 1919
- Sponsored by: Mrs. William Radford Beale
- Commissioned: 23 August 1920
- Decommissioned: 15 October 1934
- Reclassified: Small seaplane tender (AVP-20) 18 November 1939
- Recommissioned: 14 June 1940
- Reclassified: Destroyer-seaplane tender (AVD-7) 2 August 1940
- Decommissioned: 6 December 1945
- Stricken: 3 January 1946
- Fate: Sold for scrap 6 November 1946

General characteristics
- Class & type: Clemson-class destroyer
- Displacement: 1,308 tons
- Length: 314 feet 4 inches (95.81 m)
- Beam: 30 feet 11 inches (9.42 m)
- Draft: 9 feet 10 inches (3.00 m)
- Propulsion: 26,500 shp (20 MW); geared turbines, 2 screws
- Speed: 35 knots (65 km/h)
- Range: 4,900 nmi (9,100 km); @ 15 kt
- Complement: 221 officers and enlisted
- Armament: 4 × 4 in (102 mm)/50 guns, 1 × 3 in (76 mm)/25 gun, 12 × 21 inch (533 mm) torpedo tubes

USS William B. Preston (DD-344/AVP-20/AVD-7) was a United States Navy Clemson-class destroyer in commission from 1920 to 1934. After conversion into a seaplane tender, she again was in commission from 1939 to 1945, seeing action during World War II. She was named for United States Secretary of the Navy and United States Senator William B. Preston.

== Construction and commissioning ==
William B. Preston was laid down on 18 November 1918 at the Norfolk Navy Yard in Portsmouth, Virginia. She was launched on 9 August 1919, sponsored by Mrs. William Radford Beale, the eldest daughter of William B. Preston, was designated DD-344 when the U.S. Navy established its modern hull number system on 17 July 1920, and was commissioned on 23 August 1920.

== Service history ==
=== 1920–1937 ===
Following her commissioning, William B. Preston operated with Destroyer Division 19 and conducted trials and training off the United States East Coast through the end of 1920. She then proceeded south to join the United States Atlantic Fleet at Guantanamo Bay Naval Base at Guantánamo Bay, Cuba, for winter maneuvers. After these exercises, she transited the Panama Canal to participate in the Atlantic Fleet's visit to Callao, Peru, and arrived at Callao on 21 January 1921.

The ship next received orders transferring her to Destroyer Division 45 in Destroyer Squadron 14 in the United States Asiatic Fleet. She joined the Asiatic Fleet in mid-1922. With her home port at Cavite on Luzon, near Manila in the Philippine Islands, she cruised with her division on exercises and maneuvers. In the summer months each year, the ships were based ay Yantai, known in the Western world as "Chefoo," on the north coast of Shantung (now Shandong) province in China, moving southward to Philippine waters for annual winter exercises. In between, there were visits to Chinese coastal ports such as Amoy (now Xiamen), Foochow (now Fuzhou), and Swatow (now Shantou), and occasional tours on the Yangtze River between Shanghai and Hankow (now Hankou) as part of the Yangtze Patrol, including a stint in October 1926 qualifying her for the Yangtze Service Medal.

=== Nanking Incident ===
In 1926, civil strife broke out in China which can be loosely characterized as a struggle between North China and South China for control of the country. To the south, the Nationalist (Kuomintang) party moved north from its base at Canton to extend its control over warlord-dominated areas. Led by Chiang Kai-shek, the Nationalists had reached Nanking (now Nanjing) by March 1927.

William B. Preston steamed up the Yangtze on 21 March 1927 and dropped anchor off the city, joining her sister ship USS Noa (DD-343) there. Under orders to evacuate Americans, the destroyers took aboard 175 refugees – 73 aboard William B. Preston 102 aboard Noa . Gunfire coming closer to the city alerted the American destroyermen to the danger posed by the approaching Cantonese. Northern Chinese troops meanwhile melted away from the city that they were supposed to defend, leaving many foreigners in danger in the defenseless city. An armed guard from Noa stood by on shore while signal parties from William B. Preston and Noa transmitted information about the tense conditions in Nanking to the ships anchored in the muddy river. When the situation had worsened to a point of no return, Noa commenced firing with her 4-inch (102 mm) guns; William B. Preston joined in with her main battery as well and, in the 10-minute barrage, fired 22 rounds of4-inch (102 mm) projectiles to scare off the invading soldiers. Sailors on both American ships also provided fire with bolt-action Springfield rifles and drum-fed Lewis guns. The British Royal Navy light cruiser HMS Emerald and destroyer HMS Wolsey added to the barrage with their guns and the Chinese withdrew.

On 25 March 1927, with the situation much quieter in Nanking, William B. Preston prepared to leave the area in company with the refugee-laden steamer SS Kungwo. Chinese snipers, firing from concealed positions ashore, sent William B. Preston′s anchor detail scurrying for cover, and ricocheting bullets whined into the pre-dawn darkness. Return fire from a Lewis gun on the destroyer soon caused the sniper to cease fire. The ship, with civilians on board, was soon underway heading downriver. Three hours later, while proceeding between Silver Island and Xing Shan fort, small arms fire again crackled from the shore, first directed at Kungwo and next at William B. Preston. Sailors on the destroyer promptly broke out their Lewis guns and Springfield rifles to reply, but the situation suddenly worsened when a 3-inch (76.2 mm) gun at the fort opened fire on the ships. One shell splashed into the muddy river ahead of the destroyer, another fell in the ship's wake and the third passed through the fire control platform. The destroyer quickly trained her number one 4-inch (102 mm) gun around and fired three rounds in reply which, in addition to small arms and machine gun fire from the warship, silenced the firing from the shore. William B. Preston and her charges joined the British gunboat HMS Cricket and the steamer SS Wen-chow 52 miles (84 km) below Chinkiang (now Zhenjiang). Snipers once again harassed the flotilla, but machine-gun fire from Cricket soon forced the Chinese to withdraw.

After turning Kungwo over to Cricket, William B. Preston returned to Nanking unhampered by further sniping. On 27 March 1927, with 70 more refugees embarked, she cleared Nanking and headed downriver. Lieutenant Commander G. B. Ashe, the ship's commanding officer, recalled that the Chinese had emplaced a field artillery piece at a key river bend and, accordingly, ordered general quarters well in advance. Cleared for action with guns trained out and the United States flag flying, William B. Preston rounded the bend, ready for a showdown. The Chinese, however, allowed the ship to pass without opening fire. William B. Preston again qualified for the Yangtze Service Medal for her actions against snipers while convoying American nationals out of the troubled areas.

=== 1927–1934 ===
William B. Preston returned to routine cruising in East Asia soon after the Nanking Incident. She was back in the United States by 1929, home-ported at San Diego, California, and assigned to the Battle Force. She operated with the Battle Force until 1934.

To meet the obligations imposed by the Washington Naval Treaty of 1922 and the London Naval Treaty of 1930, William B. Preston was part of a group of destroyers laid up in reserve at the Philadelphia Navy Yard at League Island in Philadelphia, Pennsylvania. She was decommissioned there on 15 October 1934.

=== 1939–1941 ===
As the U.S. Navy grew in size in the first months following the outbreak of World War II in Europe on 1 September 1939, the need for auxiliary ships to support the fleet multiplied accordingly. On 18 November 1939, William B. Preston was selected for conversion to a "small seaplane tender" and redesignated AVP-20. Soon thereafter, she entered the New York Navy Yard at Brooklyn, New York, for conversion. With her conversion complete, she was recommissioned on 14 June 1940. On 2 August 1940, the ship was reclassified again, this time as a "destroyer-seaplane tender," and redesignated AVD-7.

William B. Preston departed the New York City area on 5 August 1940 and arrived at Hampton Roads, Virginia, on 6 August. On 11 August 1940, she headed for the Caribbean and arrived at Guantánamo Bay, Cuba, on 15 August. She then steamed to the Panama Canal Zone, transited the Panama Canal on 24 August 1940, and proceeded on to San Diego, where she arrived on 5 September 1940 for an eight-day pause en route to Hawaii.

Departing San Diego on 13 September 1940, William B. Preston mooring to a Submarine Base pier at Pearl Harbor, Hawaii, on 19 September 1940. She then commenced operations with the fleet. She engaged in such tasks as tending scout planes, towing targets during fleet exercises, and making routine offshore patrols through 30 September 1940. She then anchored at Palmyra Atoll in the northern Line Islands to tend U.S. Navy PBY Catalina flying boats through 4 October 1940, when she returned to Pearl Harbor.

As patrol plane reinforcements flew over the Pacific bound for the Asiatic Fleet, William B. Preston served as a plane guard for three days in October 1940. She then resumed her routine duties from Pearl Harbor.

On 6 December 1940, the seaplane tender set course for the Philippines and her second tour of duty with the Asiatic Fleet. En route, she lay to at plane guard station "George" while U.S. Navy Patrol Squadron 26 (VP-26) passed overhead on course for the Philippine Islands. On 13 December 1940 she refueled from the seaplane tender USS Wright (AV-1) and then lay to in the lee of Wake Island before proceeding on to Guam in the Mariana Islands. She arrived at Apra Harbor on Guam on 17 December 1940 but soon pressed onward and completed the last leg of her voyage to the Philippines when she anchored in Cañacao Bay, off the Cavite Navy Yard on Luzon, on 22 December 1940.

After operating in the Manila area through Christmas in late December 1940, William B. Preston took station in the harbor at Puerto Princessa on the island of Palawan, where she tended PBYs until mid-January 1941. Moving on to Tutu Bay on Jolo on 15 January 1941, she visited Igat Bay and Caldera Bay, both off Mindanao, before returning to Cañacao Bay on 8 February 1941.

From February to November 1941, the Asiatic Fleet continued its preparations as tensions increased between the United States and Japan. While some fleet units, including the majority of the destroyers, were sent south, William B. Preston was maintained in readiness in the Philippines. She tended PBYs and occasionally acted as a target tug for fleet maneuvers in the southern islands of the Philippine archipelago. After an overhaul at the Cavite Navy Yard in November 1941, she departed the Manila area on 1 December 1941, bound for the southeastern coast of Mindanao.

Upon her arrival in Davao Gulf off Mindanao, William B. Preston dropped anchor in Malalag Bay, where she was joined by a group of PBYs of the newly formed Patrol Wing 10, which soon commenced patrols. The planes reconnoitered several small bays and inlets, looking for strange ships or for any signs of suspicious activity.

=== World War II ===
==== 1941 ====
Shortly after 0300 on 8 December 1941, William B. Preston picked up the following radio message: "Japan has commenced hostilities. Govern yourselves accordingly."

Japan had launched a devastating air strike on Pearl Harbor while their invasion fleets moved southward from Indochina towards the raw-material-rich British and Dutch possessions in Malaya and the East Indies. The Philippines, too, were on the timetable for conquest.

Soon after the receipt of the notification of war, all of the planes tended by the destroyer-seaplane tender were readied for operations. Two remained behind while the rest flew off on their first war patrols over the Celebes Sea. The ship, meanwhile, shifted anchorage away from the two moored Catalinas to lessen the chance of one bomb damaging both ship and planes in one fell swoop. Bluejackets on William B. Preston belted ammunition for the ship's antiaircraft defense of four .50-caliber water-cooled Browning machine guns and took down the awnings which had shielded the crew from the tropical sun.

Around 0800, the ship's commanding officer, Lt. Comdr. Etheridge Grant, went forward to check the progress of the preparations to slip the anchor chain (should that become necessary). Suddenly a lookout called out, "Aircraft!" Grant sprinted to the bridge while Japanese planes swept around the narrow neck of the land shielding Malalag Bay from the broad Gulf of Davao. The attacking planes were nine "Claudes" and thirteen "Vals" from the Japanese aircraft carrier Ryūjō. This was the first U.S.–Japanese combat in the Philippines of World War II.

Going for the seaplanes first, the "Claudes" made short work of the Catalinas riding at their mooring buoys. Within a few short moments, both PBY's had been shot to pieces and sank into the waters of the bay as the survivors, carrying one dead and one wounded comrade with them, swam for shore.

Meanwhile, the ship lowered a boat to pick up survivors while she got underway for the open sea. Slipping her anchor chain, William B. Preston zigzagged across the bay as both "Claudes" and "Vals" attacked the fleeing tender. Evading the bombs, the ship managed to emerge from the attack unscathed and returned to the bay to pick up her boat and the survivors from the two lost planes.

Later that day, upon receipt of orders dispatching her to Moro Gulf, William B. Preston got underway to establish another advance base for PBY's at Police Bay. Retiring from Davao Gulf, the destroyer-seaplane tender slipped past four Japanese destroyers whose attention was probably focused on bigger game elsewhere. One hour later, a snooping Japanese plane picked up the ship's scent and trailed her for three hours, leading those on board William B. Preston to suspect that the Japanese were sending out a second strike to finish the job begun earlier. Steering as close to the shoreline as safe navigation would permit, Lt. Cmdr. Grant prepared to beach the ship should that prove necessary, but the plane departed and left the seaplane tender alone.

Arriving off the mouth of Moro Bay in the afternoon, the ship lay to until the following morning, 9 December, when she entered the bay. An explosion ahead of the ship sent the American bluejackets to their general quarters stations before it was discovered that the local fishermen were just out dynamiting for their catch.

The ship found a PBY awaiting her arrival and commenced tending operations. Three more Catalinas arrived later in the afternoon, as well as two OS2U Kingfishers which had been attached to Heron at Balabac. After being informed that Japanese troops had landed north of Gagayan and were marching overland to Police, the ship prepared to get underway and dispatched the PBY's on patrol over the Celebes Sea. Leaving word that the planes were to rendezvous with the ship at Tutu Bay, Jolo, William B. Preston got underway on 10 December.

The ship arrived at Tutu Bay later that day and found the PBY's awaiting her, after having found no trace of enemy activity during their patrol sweeps. At sunset, a veritable procession of masts and funnels moved across the southern horizon; and the men on the William B. Preston could only guess to whom they belonged.

The following day, the planes were again sent out on patrols while the ship upped anchor and proceeded for Tawi Tawi, receiving word en route that the PBY's were to return to Lake Lanao in Mindanao and the OS2U's were to rendezvous with the ship at Tawi Tawi. Although she had never hoisted aboard any aircraft before, William B. Preston's bluejackets rigged up a crude cradle between the two 50-foot motor-boats aft and provided padding for the Kingfisher's center float with mattresses and life jackets. One OS2U was taken aboard and berthed in this fashion while the other was towed astern. Smooth seas and a 15-knot pace facilitated the towing operation, and the two planes arrived safely at Tarakan, Borneo.

Met by two Dutch destroyers, Kortenaer and Witte de With, the seaplane tender made port at Tarakan but was soon underway again, this time for Balikpapan, Borneo, joining many ships from the Asiatic Fleet (Marblehead, Holland, Langley, Gold Star, and Heron). Two hours after arrival, the ship received orders to accompany the small fleet to Makassar and got underway on 13 December.

After arriving at Makassar, William B. Preston spent three days provisioning and catching up on news of the progress of the war. The latter looked bleak, as Japanese forces swept southward, sweeping everything before them and forcing Allied naval, air, and ground units southward into the East Indies. The ship arrived at Surabaya, Java, shortly before Christmas but, after further provisioning and fueling, departed the Dutch naval base there on the 27th.

==== 1942 ====
The ship arrived at Darwin, Australia, on the day after New Year's Day 1942 and soon received orders to provision to capacity and take on large stocks of spare parts, food, and replacement crews for the decimated ranks of personnel in PatWing 10. The ship then proceeded north for Ambon, in the Dutch East Indies, crowded with 100 extra men and much topside freight.

Upon her arrival at Ambon, the destroyer-seaplane tender found sister ship Childs and passed that ship enough fuel to enable her to reach Darwin. After delivering her embarked men and cargo, William B. Preston proceeded to Kendari, where she was camouflaged to blend in with the verdant hillside to which she was moored - in fact, she was so well camouflaged that her PBYs had trouble locating her when they returned to their base.

For the remainder of January and into February, the ship continued her tending operations as the forces combating the Japanese rapidly dwindled. On 12 February 1942, William B. Preston dropped anchor at Darwin to commence tending PBYs from that base in northern Australia. In about a week, her fuel began running low, forcing Lt. Comdr. Grant to go ashore to arrange for a delivery of much-needed fuel and gasoline to the ship.

At 0955, lookouts called down "large formations of planes approaching" and the ship went to general quarters. Within minutes, the ship was underway. Zigzagging her way through the crowded harbor, William B. Preston made for the open sea.

The first wave of planes attacked the town and its nearby fuel dumps and docks; the second wave went after the ships in the harbor, with transports and cargo ships as the primary objectives. Within minutes of each other, transports Tulagi and Meigs took hits; and ships alongside the docks were heavily hit as bombs rained indiscriminately on the port area.

Four bombs exploded off William B. Preston's bow, breaking bridge windows. The .30- and .50-caliber antiaircraft fire forced some of the attackers to keep their distance, but others pressed the attack with vigor. Peary, slower in getting underway, was enveloped in bomb splashes as Japanese accuracy marked the ship for destruction. Heavily hit, Peary burst into flames and rapidly became an inferno as bomb after bomb tore the ship apart and sank her down by the stern.

Preston's turn was next, however; and she was hit aft, just forward of the after deckhouse. The ship lost steering control forward; and, in the interim period between regaining control by hand-steering aft, Lt. Wood conned and steered the ship using her engines and, despite a jammed rudder, succeeded in making for an opening in the harbor boom. Negotiating it by "judicious use of engines and slight assistance from the rudder with direct hand steering," William B. Preston escaped the inferno that left Darwin shattered and ruined as a base of operations for the Allies.

Heading south down the western coast of Australia, the ship took stock of her damage. Eleven men were killed, two missing, and three wounded by the bomb hit aft.

Note on casualties: Kriloff (2000) states 10 deaths. Kriloff (2002) states 15 deaths. Eight deaths and two missing in action is confirmed by. However the Ship's log for 19 February lists the following casualties Gluba, Kerns, Redfern and Simpson not being mentioned on the previous "Report of Changes".

The after living compartment was a mass of wreckage; rivets were popped and seams sprung; the after deck house was riddled with holes; the after 4-inch and machine guns had been put out of action. At about 1445, a Japanese ("Mavis" patrol plane attacked the ship, but her bombs splashed harmlessly into the ship's wake, and the plane discontinued her attack.

Proceeding to Derby, Western Australia, William B. Preston touched briefly on a shoal as she entered the harbor, and reduced the effective speed of the starboard engine down to eight knots. Meanwhile, the single remaining PBY attached to the ship returned from Darwin with the men who had gone ashore and had been caught away from the ship during the attack, including Lt. Cmdr. Grant, who had been blown out of a motorboat while returning to the ship.

On 23 February, the damaged William B. Preston proceeded for Broome, Australia, and was soon joined by Childs and Heron, who both assisted the damaged seaplane tender in making emergency repairs. As Java fell, to the north, three of William B. Preston's planes served in the evacuation of Surabaya and Tjilatjap. Meanwhile, the ship received orders to proceed for Fremantle for repairs.

Upon arrival, however, there were not sufficient facilities available to effect the needed yard work, so the ship was routed on to Sydney. There, on the east coast of Australia, William B. Preston received a much-needed overhaul and repair period. Her old 4-inch guns were replaced by 3-inch antiaircraft guns, while 20-millimeter Oerlikons were added as well to augment her close-in antiaircraft capability. Following her availability, the ship proceeded to Fremantle and reported for duty to Commander, Patrol Wing 10, in June 1942.

Java had fallen, as had the Philippines and Malaya. Thus, the Australian sub-continent stood as the last Allied territory in the southwest Pacific to oppose further Japanese expansion. Operating out of Fremantle, the destroyer-seaplane tender alternated with Heron and Childs at such advance bases as Exmouth Gulf and Fremantle through the early summer of 1942.

Anchored in the vicinity of Bay of Rest, Exmouth Gulf, Western Australia, William B. Preston continued her operations as a seaplane tender through early July, attached to Patrol Wing 10 and servicing two PBY-5 planes. One plane conducted a daily patrol as far as Broome, while the other remained at a buoy near the ship with her crew living on board the tender. The ship's log noted that she was "in all respects ready to slip anchor and get underway instantly—-day or night." The calm waters of the bay and the generally perfect flying weather combined to greatly facilitate flight operations.

Relieved by Heron on 14 July, the ship cleared Exmouth Gulf, bound for Fremantle for general upkeep. Securing alongside Isabel at north dock, Fremantle, she commenced a yard period, taking on fuel, gasoline, and provisions over the next eight days, departing on 26 July. She steamed back to Exmouth Gulf and relieved Heron on the 29th.

==== 1943 ====
For the remainder of 1942 and into 1943, William B. Preston continued this general routine, exchanging tender duties with Heron and Childs and undergoing periodic general upkeep at Fremantle. In February 1943, a heavy storm hit Exmouth Gulf, sending two PBYs onto a reef. A third Catalina took off despite the typhoon and made its way through sheets of rain and thick clouds to safely arrive at Geraldton. Within two days, replacement planes had arrived; and William B. Preston recommenced tender operations.

On 1 April, the seaplane tender moved to Shark Bay, Western Australia, to serve as an advance base; she subsequently tended PBYs for a time at West Lewis Island, near Enderby Island, Western Australia. Later, following the month of January 1944, in which the ship received full overhaul and upkeep, William B. Preston operated out of Fremantle on submarine exercises serving as a target vessel for the submarines operating out of that port. She continued these activities through the spring and summer of 1944.

==== 1944 ====
At Darwin, on 18 August, the ship embarked the Deputy Commander, Fleet Air Wing 10, and other men from that unit for transportation to the Admiralty Islands. After departing Australia, she proceeded to New Guinea, arriving at Milne Bay on 22 August. Pushing on to the Admiralties, the ship dropped anchor at Manus on the 24th, disembarking her passengers and fueling preparatory to heading for the Ellice Islands. The ship made Funafuti on 31 August.

Attached to Service Force, Pacific Fleet, and under orders from Commander, Air, Pacific Fleet (ComAir-Pac), William B. Preston headed for the United States. Stopping briefly at Palmyra Island and Pearl Harbor en route to the west coast, the seaplane tender arrived at San Francisco on 18 September. She then proceeded to San Pedro, Los Angeles, and thence to Terminal Island for overhaul.

From 1 October to 8 November, William B. Preston underwent voyage repairs and alterations to her armament. The ship also received a much-needed drydocking for bottom work before getting underway for post-repair trials which concluded on 16 November. Putting out to sea on 21 November, the newly refitted ship rendezvoused with Ranger as the carrier engaged in training operations and carrier qualification flights for new pilots.

For the remainder of 1944, the destroyer-seaplane tender operated as plane guard and antisubmarine escort ship out of San Diego. Alternating in company with Ranger or Matanikau (CVE-101), she kept a lookout for planes forced to "ditch" while in the hands of student pilots learning the nuances of the Grumman F6F Hellcat fighter.

==== 1945 ====
After spending New Year's Day 1945 at San Diego, William B. Preston continued plane guarding and screening duties, clearing her home port on 2 January to join Matanikau off the California coast. During flight operations on 3 January, a Hellcat crashed while taking off, and the destroyer-seaplane tender sped to the rescue. The ship's whaleboat, soon in the water, rescued the soaked pilot, and William B. Preston subsequently returned the aviator to his carrier via highline transfer.

For the remainder of January and into February, the ship's duties continued to be much in the same vein, until she returned to the Bethlehem Steel repair yard at Alameda, California, on 14 February, for availability. She remained in dockyard hands until the 21st, after which time she rejoined Matanikau during further carrier qualification trials.

After returning to port for a hull inspection at the Naval Repair Base, San Diego, William B. Preston operated with a succession of carriers engaged in flight training: Takanis Bay, Thetis Bay, Siboney, and Ranger. On 26 July, a wave caved in the forward port in the ship's office, flooding the radio room and putting it out of commission. Detached from further duty, she returned to San Diego where repairs could be made.

Following completion of work, William B. Preston returned to further plane guard activities, alternating with Ranger and Puget Sound. War's end on 15 August 1945 found the venerable destroyer-seaplane tender at anchor in San Diego harbor.

As newer AVPs joined the Fleet and the end of the war made further expansion unnecessary, the need for older ships like William B. Preston diminished. The ship departed the west coast and arrived at Philadelphia on 9 October 1945 for preparation for disposal.

== Decommissioning and disposal ==
On 6 December 1945, William B. Preston was decommissioned; and, on 3 January 1946, her name was struck from the Navy list. On 6 November 1946, the Northern Metals Company, of Philadelphia, purchased the hulk for scrapping.

== Awards and honors ==
- Yangtze Service Medal
- American Defense Service Medal
- Asiatic-Pacific Campaign Medal with one battle star
- World War II Victory Medal
- Philippine Defense Medal

William B. Preston received the Yangtze Service Medal for operations on the Yangtze Patrol from 20 to 28 October 1926, from 2 to 29 March 1927, from 29 May to 1 June 1927, and from 26 June to 27 August 1927.

William B. Preston received one battle star for her World War II service for the Philippine Islands Operation for the period from 8 December 1941 to 3 March 1942.
