= Patrol Wing =

Aviation unit of the United States

A Patrol Wing (PatWing) was a United States Navy aviation unit with the commander of a Patrol Wing known as the Commodore, the ComPatWing or COMPATWING. From 1 November 1942 to 30 June 1973 Patrol Wings were designated "Fleet Air Wings". On 26 March 1999 all then existing Pacific Fleet Patrol Wings were redesignated Patrol and Reconnaissance Wings and on 1 June 1999 all then existing Atlantic Fleet Patrol Wings were redesigned Patrol and Reconnaissance Wings with the Commodore designated as COMPATRECONWING or ComPatReconWing.

Currently, there are three Patrol and Reconnaissance Wings in the U.S. Navy

== Active Patrol and Reconnaissance Wings ==
=== Patrol and Reconnaissance Wing ONE ===
Lineage: Patrol Wing 1(1st), Fleet Air Wing 1, Patrol Wing 1(2nd), Patrol and Reconnaissance Wing 1.

The wing was established as Patrol Wing 1 In San Diego on 1 Oct 1937. It relocated to NAS Kaneohe, Hawaii on 16 October 1941. On 19 September 1942 it relocated to Noumea where on 1 November 1942 it was redesignated Fleet Air Wing One (FAW-1). In December 1942 it was relocated to Espiritu Santo; and in March 1943 to Guadalcanal, and in February 1944 to Munda. In July 1944 it was relocated back to Espiritu Santo, and on 11 September 1944 to the Schouten Islands aboard USS Hamlin (AV-15). On 15 October 1944 the wing was relocated to Ulithi, and on 30 December 1944 relocated to Saipan. On 19 February 1945 it was relocated to Iwo Jima during invasion operations aboard Hamlin (AV 15); on 10 March 1945 it relocated to NAF Agana, Guam; and on 26 March 1945 to Kerama Rhetto aboard Hamlin. On 14 July 1945 it was relocated to NAF Chimu Wan, Okinawa.

On 16 July 1950 Fleet Air Wing One was relocated to Naval Air Station Agana, Guam, then to NAF Naha, Okinawa. During this period it conducted operations in the Korean War. In the 3rd Quarter 1952 was relocated to NAS San Diego, Calif. In the 4th Quarter 1954 returned to NAF Naha, Okinawa. In mid-1958 it relocated to Buckner Bay, Okinawa, aboard assigned flagship. In mid-1965 it again returned to NAF Naha, Okinawa where on 30 June 1973 Fleet Air Wings were redesigned Patrol Wings and the wing once again became Patrol Wing ONE. A month later it relocated to Naval Support Facility Kamiseya, Japan where it assumed the role of a headquarters staff, with no squadrons permanently assigned which exercised operational control of VP squadrons deployed to 7th Fleet as Commander, Task Force 72. In 1995 when U.S. Fifth Fleet was established to conduct operations in the Middle East, PATWING ONE assumed the same role for 5th Fleet as CTF-57. On 1 June 1999 all Pacific Fleet Patrol Wings were redesignated Patrol and Reconnaissance Wings and the wing became Patrol and Reconnaissance Wing ONE.

Patrol and Reconnaissance Wing 1 continued operations from Kamiseya as Commander Task Force 72 for 7th Fleet, and Commander Task Force 57 for 5th Fleet until September 2003 when the Navy elevated the rank of the Commander from Captain to that of Rear Admiral. At that time the wing ceased being called Commander, Patrol and Reconnaissance Wing 1 (COMPATRECONWING ONE) and it became Commander, Patrol and Reconnaissance Force 5th Fleet and Commander, Patrol and Reconnaissance Force 7th Fleet (COMPATRECONFOR 5TH/7TH Fleet), it also retained the titles Commander, Task Force 72 and Commander Task Force 57. It was also dual hatted as Commander, Fleet Air Western Pacific (COMFAIRWESTPAC). At that time it relocated to Naval Air Facility Misawa which is located aboard Misawa Air Base in Northern Japan. In 2010 part of the COMPATRECONFOR 5th/7th Fleet staff (to include the Commander) was relocated to NAF Atsugi, while the remainder of the staff remained in Misawa. In 2011 the 5th Fleet stood up COMPATRECONWING 57, a Headquarters staff, to function as Commander, Task Force 57 which reported to COMPATRECONFOR 5th/7th Fleet. In 2012 COMFAIRWESTPAC became Commander, Fleet Air Forward. In July 2013 the Rear Admiral commanding COMPATRECONFOR 5th/7th Fleet was replaced with a Captain and at some point after that the COMPATRECONFOR 5th/7th Fleet designation ceased being used and the COMPATRECONWING ONE designation reappeared attached to the Commander, Task Force 72 and Commander, Fleet Air Forward Designations.

=== Patrol and Reconnaissance Wing Ten ===
Lineage: Patrol Wing 10(2nd), Patrol and Reconnaissance Wing 10.

Patrol and Reconnaissance Wing Ten is located at NAS Whidbey Island, Washington. It was established at NAS Moffett Field, California as Patrol Wing Ten (the third Wing to use either the Patrol Wing or Fleet Air Wing Ten designation) on 1 June 1981. The wing relocated to NAS Whidbey Island on 1 July 1994. Patrol and Reconnaissance Wing 10 consisted of VP-1, VP-4, VP-9, VP-40, VP-46, VP-47, VQ-1 and VPU-2 in mid-2016. VP-9 and VP-47 were transferred to Commander, Patrol and Reconnaissance Forces, US Pacific Fleet (formerly Commander, Patrol Wings, Pacific) in Hawaii in 1994. They returned to the wing in 2016 and 2017 when PATRECONWING, PACFLT/PATRECONWING TWO was disestablished. The wing's former squadrons included VP-19 and VP-48, which were inactivated during the Navy's post-Cold War drawdown in the mid-1990s; and VQ-2, which was merged into VQ-1 in 2012.

Although not part of the wing, the Navy Reserve's VP-69 which is part of the Navy Reserve's "Maritime Support Wing" is also located at NAS Whidbey Island. Also not part of the wing, VP-31, the Pacific Fleet Replacement Squadron (training unit) for the P-3B, P-3C and EP-3E, was also located at NAS Moffett Field. VP-31 was disestablished before NAS Moffett Field closed on 31 July 1994.

=== Patrol and Reconnaissance Wing ELEVEN ===
Lineage: Patrol Wing 11(1st), Fleet Air Wing 11, Patrol Wing 11(2nd), Patrol and Reconnaissance Wing 11.

Patrol and Reconnaissance Wing ELEVEN is located at NAS Jacksonville, Florida. It was established as Patrol Wing 11 on 15 August 1942 at Naval Air Station Norfolk but five days later it relocated to NAS Isla Grande, Puerto Rico, where on 1 November 1942 it was redesignated Fleet Air Wing-11. In April 1959 the wing relocated to NAS Jacksonville. The wing received control of VP-56 in 1971 and VP-24 and VP-49 following their relocation from NAS Patuxent River, Maryland to NAS Jacksonville. On 30 June 1973 still existing Fleet Air Wings were redesignated Patrol Wings and the wing once again became Patrol Wing ELEVEN. On 26 March 1999 all Atlantic Fleet Patrol Wings were redesignated Patrol and Reconnaissance Wings and the wing became Patrol and Reconnaissance Wing ELEVEN. The wing includes VP-5, VP-8, VP-10, VP-16, VP-26, and VP-45 operating the P-8A Poseidon and VUP-19 operating the MQ-4C Triton. The wing previously included VP-24, VP-49 and VP-56, which were disestablished during the Navy's post-Cold War drawdown in the mid-1990s, and VPU-1, which was later merged into VPU-2 in 2012. Although not part of the wing, VP-30, the combined P-8A, P-3C and EP-3E Aries Fleet Replacement Squadron (FRS) for the Atlantic Fleet and Pacific Fleet and the United States Navy Reserve's VP-62 operating the P-3C Orion which is assigned to the Navy Reserve's "Maritime Support Wing", are also located at NAS Jacksonville.

== Former Patrol and Reconnaissance, Patrol, and Fleet Air Wings ==
=== Patrol Wing Two ===
Lineage: Patrol Wing 2(1st), Fleet Air Wing 2, Patrol Wing 2(2nd).

Patrol Wing Two was established at FAB Pearl Harbor on 1 October 1937. On 15 September 1942 it relocated to NAS Kaneohe Bay, where on 1 November 1942 it was redesignated Fleet Air Wing 2 (FAW-2). The wing remained at NAS Kaneohe Bay until 1949 when it relocated to NAS Barbers Point on 30 June of that year. Since the 1950s Barbers Point was most famous for its "Rainbow Fleet"—the patrol squadrons that routinely deployed with P-2 and later P-3 aircraft to the northern and western Pacific, Indian Ocean and Persian Gulf. These squadrons tracked Soviet submarines patrolling off the western coast of the United States and supported operations in the Vietnam War, the Gulf War and most recently the NATO air campaign over Kosovo. On 30 Jun 1973, Fleet Air Wings were redesignated Patrol Wings and the wing once again became Patrol Wing 2. Of the squadrons present during the 1960s and 1970s, VP-28 was disestablished in the 1970s and VP-6, VP-17, and VP-22 were disestablished by the mid-1990s, leaving only VP-1 and VP-4. During the mid-1990s, however, two squadrons, VP-9 and VP-47, transferred to the Rainbow Fleet from NAS Moffett Field, Calif., when Moffett Field was disestablished as a USN installation and transferred to NASA and the California Air National Guard as a "Moffett Federal Airfield" via BRAC action. VP-1 later transferred to Patrol and Reconnaissance Wing 10 and relocated to NAS Whidbey Island, Wash. The Rainbow Fleet also was the home of Special Projects Patrol Squadron Two (VPU-2) since 1982.

The end of the Cold War, in which NAS Barbers Point figured so heavily, also eventually brought about its closure. Congress accepted the recommendation of the 1993 Base Realignment and Closure Commission (BRAC) that NAS Barbers Point be closed and as part of that a closure, on 8 June 1993 Patrol Wing TWO was disestablished. After the disestablishment of Patrol Wing 2, its role was assumed by the staff of Commander, Patrol and Reconnaissance Forces, US Pacific Fleet (formerly Commander, Patrol Wings, Pacific) and the wings former squadrons (VP-4, VP-9, VP-47 and VPU-2) along with HSL-37 all moved from NAS Barber's Point upon its closure to what was then Marine Corps Air Station Kaneohe Bay, now Marine Corps Air Facility Kaneohe Bay, part of Marine Corps Base Hawaii, located on the windward side of Oahu.

=== Patrol and Reconnaissance Wing Two ===
Lineage: Patrol and Reconnaissance Wing 2.

In October 2003, Patrol and Reconnaissance Wing TWO was established at Marine Corps Air Station Kaneohe Bay to assume control over the former Patrol Wing TWO squadrons which had been moved there from Naval Air Station Barbers Point when that Air Station was closed and Patrol Wing TWO was disestablished in 1993. Those squadrons were VP-4, VP-9, VP-47, and VPU-2. Though the new wing assumed the disestablished Patrol Wing TWO's insignia and traditions in honor of the distinguished history of that wing it was a new wing, not a redesignation of Patrol Wing TWO. Patrol and Reconnaissance Wing TWO was disestablished effective 1 May 2017 and its squadrons were all realigned under Patrol and Reconnaissance Wing TEN.

=== Fleet Air Wing Three ===
Lineage: Patrol Wing 3, Fleet Air Wing 3.

Fleet Air Wing 3 was established as Patrol Wing 3 at FAB Coco Solo, Panama on 1 October 1937. On 1 November 1942 it was redesigned Fleet Air Wing 3 (FAW-3). It participated Operation Strikeback in the Atlantic. On 1 July 1950 it was relocated to NAS Quonset Point, Rhode Island and in mid-1957 it was relocated to NAS Brunswick, Maine. Fleet Air Wing-3 was disestablished on 30 June 1971.

=== Fleet Air Wing Four ===
Lineage: Patrol Wing 4, Fleet Air Wing 4.

Fleet Air Wing 4 was established as Patrol Wing 4 at FAB Seattle, Washington (NAS Sand Point, Washington) on 1 October 1937. On 27 May it relocated to NAS Kodiak, Alaska where on 1 November 1942 it was redesignated Fleet Air Wing 4 (FAW-4). On 15 March 1943 it relocated to NAS Adak, Alaska then on 26 April 1944 to NAF Attu, Aleutian Islands. The wing fought in the Aleutian Islands campaign alongside Eleventh Air Force. During the winter of 1943–44, the burden of operations against the Kuriles was carried by Navy Consolidated PBY Catalinas and Lockheed Ventura of Fleet Air Wing Four. They carried small bomb loads and their primary objective was the securing of nighttime reconnaissance photographs. On 17 April 1949 the wing relocated to NAS Whidbey Island, Washington and became dual hatted with Commander Fleet Air (COMFAIR) Seattle with additional duty as FAW-4 in May 1949. On 15 February 1954 COMFAIR Seattle was redesignated COMFAIR Whidbey and FAW-4 (dual hatted). Fleet Air Wing 4 was disestablished on 15 March 1970.

=== Patrol and Reconnaissance Wing Five ===
Lineage: Patrol Wing 5(1st), Fleet Air Wing 5, Patrol Wing 5(2nd), Patrol and Reconnaissance Wing 5.

Patrol and Reconnaissance Wing 5 was established as Patrol Wing 5 at FAB Norfolk on 1 October 1937. It was redesignated Fleet Air Wing 5 (FAW-5) on 1 November 1942 relocating to NAS Brunswick, Maine on 30 June 1971. On 1 July 1973 Fleet Air Wing 5 was redesignated Commander, Patrol Wings Atlantic (COMPATWINGSLA/PATWING FIVENTd). On 1 July 197e COMPATWINGSLAN became a separate Headquarters.5. On 26 March 1999 all Atlantic Fleet Patrol Wings were redesignated Patrol and Reconnaissance Wings and Patrol Wing 5 became Patrol and Reconnaissance Wing 5. During the wing's existence it included VP-8, VP-10, VP-11, VP-23, VP-26, VP-44, VPU-1 and the Navy Reserve's VP-92. With the decision to close NAS Brunswick, VP-8, VP-10, VP-26 and VPU-1 were transferred to Patrol and Reconnaissance Wing Eleven at NAS Jacksonville, Florida.a, VP-11, VP-23 and VP-44 having been previously disestablished during the Navy's post-Cold War drawdown of the mid-1990s which eliminated 50% of the Navy's active duty patrol squadrons. VP-92 was disestablished in 20 when the Naval Reserve reduced the total number of patrol squadrons from ts thirteve to ons. VP-92 had previously been assigned to Reserve Patrol Wing Atlantic (RESPATWINGLANT), but was transferred to COMPATRECONWING FIVE following RESPATWINGLANT's inactivation aclosure of om NAS South Weymouth, Massachusetts due to an earlier BRAC decision in the mid-1990s.

=== Fleet Air Wing Six(1st) ===
Lineage: Fleet Air Wing 6(1st).

The first wing to use the Fleet Air Wing 6 (FAW-6) designation was established at NAS Seattle, Washington on 2 November 1942. It relocated to NAS Whidbey Island, Washington on 29 December 1942 and was disestablished there on 1 December 1945.

=== Fleet Air Wing Six(2nd) ===
Lineage: Fleet Air Wing 6(2nd).

On 4 August 1950 the Fleet Air Wing 6 designation was used again to establish a new Fleet Air Wing at NAS Yokosuka, Japan to conduct operations in support of the Korean War. On 1 December 1950 the wing relocated to NAS Atsugi, Japan. It relocated to NAS Alameda, California during the 3rd quarter of 1952. In January 1955 the wing transferred back to Japan, this time to NAF Iwakuni where it was ultimately disestablished on 1 July 1972.

=== Fleet Air Wing Seven ===
Lineage: Patrol Wing Support Force, Patrol Wing 7, Fleet Air Wing 7.

Fleet Air Wing 7 (FAW-7) was established as Patrol Wing Support Force at NAF Argentia, Newfoundland on 1 March 1941. It was redesignated Patrol Wing 7 there on 1 July 1941. On 15 December 1941 it relocated to NAF Keflavik, Iceland and then to NAS Quonset Point, Rhode Island on 20 February 1942. On 15 May it relocated back to NAF Argentina where on 1 November 1942 it was redesignated Fleet Air Wing 7 (FAW-7). On 21 August 1943 it relocated to Plymouth, England then to NAS Dunkeswell, England on 10 July 1945. On 14 July 1945 it embarked USS Albemarle (AV 5) for return to the United States and was disestablished at NAS Norfolk on 4 August 1945.

=== Fleet Air Wing Eight(1st) ===
Lineage:Patrol Wing 8, Fleet Air Wing 8(1st).

The first wing to use the Fleet Air Wing 8 (FAW-8) designation was established as Patrol Wing 8 at Naval Air Facility Breezy Point, Norfolk, VA on 8 July 1941. On 15 December 1941 it relocated to NAS Alameda, California where it was redesignated Fleet Air Wing 8 (FAW-8) (the first wing to use that designation). It was disestablished there on 3 July 1946

=== Fleet Air Wing Eight(2nd) ===
Lineage: Fleet Air Wing 8(2nd).

On 1 July 1965 the Fleet Air Wing 8 designation was used again to establish a new Fleet Air Wing at Naval Air Station Moffett Field, California. This second wing to use the Fleet Air Wing 8 designation was disestablished on 1 August 1972.

=== Fleet Air Wing Nine ===
Lineage: Patrol Wing 9, Fleet Air Wing 9.

Fleet Air Wing 9 (FAW-9) was established as Patrol Wing 9 at NAS Norfolk, Virginia in April 1942. On 1 May 1942 it relocated to NAS Quonset Point, Rhode Island where on 1 November of that year it was redesignated Fleet Air Wing 9 (FAW-9). On 24 August 1943 it relocated to NAS New York where it was disestablished on 19 July 1945.

=== Fleet Air Wing Ten(1st) ===
Lineage:Patrol Wing 10(1st), Fleet Air Wing 10(1st).

The first wing to use the Patrol Wing 10 designation was established as Patrol Wing 10 at Naval Station Cavite, Philippines in December 1940. It relocated to Ambon on 28 December 1941 and to Soerabaja on 15 January 1942. On 7 March it relocated to Crawley, Western Australia where on 1 November 1942 it was redesignated Fleet Air Wing 10 (FAW-10) (first use of the Fleet Air Wing 10 designation). On 17 October 1944 it relocated to Los Negros, Admiralty Islands. On 17 October 1944 it relocated back to the Philippines where it was ultimately disestablished on 1 June 1947 at NAB Sangley Point.

=== Fleet Air Wing Ten(2nd) ===
Lineage: Fleet Air Wing 10(2nd).

On 29 June 1963 the Fleet Air Wing 10 designation was used again to establish a new Fleet Air Wing at Naval Air Station Moffett Field, California. This second wing to use the Fleet Air Wing 10 designation was disestablished on 30 June 1973.

=== Fleet Air Wing Twelve ===
Lineage: Patrol Wing 12, Fleet Air Wing 12.

Fleet Air Wing 12 (FAW-12) was established as Patrol Wing 12 at NAS Key West, Florida on 16 September 1942. On 1 November 1942 it was redesignated Fleet Air Wing 12 (FAW-12). On 15 September 1943 it relocated to Naval Air Station Miami, Florida until 1 June 1945 when it transferred back to Key West and disestablished on 14 July 1945.

=== Fleet Air Wing Fourteen ===
Lineage: Patrol Wing 14, Fleet Air Wing 14.

Fleet Air Wing 14 (FAW-14) was established as Patrol Wing 14 at NAS San Diego, California on 15 October 1942. On 1 November 1942 it was redesignated Fleet Air Wing 14 (FAW-14). In June 1963 it also became Commander Fleet Air (COMFAIR) San Diego and was known as COMFAIR San Diego/FAW-14. It was disestablished in 1969.

=== Fleet Air Wing Fifteen ===
Lineage: Fleet Air Wing 15.

Fleet Air Wing 15 (FAW-15) was established at NAS Norfolk, Virginia on 1 December 1942 then relocated to NAF Port Lyautey, French Morocco on 10 January 1943 to direct patrol plane operations in the Mediterranean and Gibraltar Strait Area. On 10 June 1945 it returned to NAS Norfolk where it was disestablished on 28 July 1945.

=== Fleet Air Wing Sixteen ===
Lineage: Fleet Air Wing 16.

Fleet Air Wing 16 (FAW-16) was established at Naval Air Station Norfolk, Virginia on 16 February 1943 then relocated to Natal, Brazil on 14 April 1943. On 20 July 1943 it relocated to Recife, Brazil where it was ultimately disestablished on 27 June 1945.

=== Fleet Air Wing Seventeen ===
Lineage: Fleet Air Wing 17.

Fleet Air Wing 17 (FAW-17) was established at Brisbane, Australia on 15 September 1943. On 31 December 1943 it relocated to the island of Samari, Papua, New Guinea then to Manus, Admiralty Islands on 27 July 1944. On 9 September 1944 it relocated to Woendi, Schouten Islands, then to Morotai, N.E.I on 19 October 1944. On 30 December 1944 it relocated to Leyte Gulf, Philippines, then on 28 January 1945 to Lingayen Gulf, Philippines and based aboard USS Tangier (AV 8). On 26 February 1945 it relocated to Clark Field, Luzon, Philippines. It was disestablished on 2 January 1946 in Japan.

=== Fleet Air Wing Eighteen ===
Lineage: Fleet Air Wing 18.

Fleet Air Wing 18 (FAW-18) was established at Naval Station Agana, Guam on 5 May 1945, to NAF Tinian on 25 May 1945 and disestablished there on 30 June 1947.

=== Reserve Patrol Wing Atlantic ===
Reserve Patrol Wing Atlantic (RESPATWINGLANT) was established in 1970 and located at NAS Norfolk, Virginia until relocating to Naval Air Station Willow Grove, Pennsylvania in 2000. A subordinate element of Naval Air Reserve Force (NAVAIRESFOR), RESPATWINGLANT provided maritime patrol aircraft, flight crews and maintenance/support personnel in seven Reserve patrol squadrons (VP) to support Commander, U.S. Patrol Wings Atlantic. RESPATWINGLANT, an Echelon IV command, comprised VP-62 at Naval Air Station Jacksonville, Florida; VP-64 and VP-66 at Naval Air Station Willow Grove, Pennsylvania; VP-67 at Naval Air Station Memphis, Tennessee; VP-68 at NAF Washington/Andrews AFB, Maryland; VP-92 at NAS South Weymouth, Massachusetts (later relocating to NAS Brunswick, Maine following the BRAC closure of NAS South Weymouth); and VP-94 at NAS New Orleans, Louisiana. Upon the inactivation of RESPATWINGLANT in 2004, the transition of VP-64 to a fleet air logistics squadron redesignated as VR-64, and the inactivation of all but two remaining Atlantic Fleet Reserve VP squadrons, operational control/administrative control (OPCON/ADCON) of VP-62 was passed to Commander, Patrol and Reconnaissance Wing Eleven and OPCON/ADCON of VP-92 to Commander, Patrol and Reconnaissance Wing Five. VP-92 was later inactivated as part of the inactivation of Patrol and Reconnaissance Wing Five and the BRAC-directed closure of NAS Brunswick, leaving VP-62 as the sole remaining Naval Air Reserve VP squadron in the Atlantic Fleet.

=== Reserve Patrol Wing Pacific/Patrol Wing Four ===
Reserve Patrol Wing Pacific (RESPATWINGPAC), later dual-designated as Patrol Wing Four (PATWING FOUR), was established in 1970 and located at Naval Air Station Moffett Field, California. A subordinate element of Naval Air Reserve Force (NAVAIRESFOR), RESPATWINGPAC provided maritime patrol aircraft, flight crews and maintenance/support personnel in six Reserve patrol squadrons (VP) to support Commander, U.S. Patrol Wings Pacific. RESPATWINGPaAC an Echelon IV command, comprised VP-60 and VP-90 at NAS Glenview, Illinois; VP-65 at NAS Point Mugu, California; VP-69 at NAS Whidbey Island, Washington; VP-91 at NAS Moffett Field, California and VP-93 at NAF Detroit/Selfridge ANGB, Michigan. Following the closure of NAS Moffett Field in the mid-1990s due to BRAC action, RESPATWINGPAC/PATWING FOUR and VP-91 remained at the renamed Moffett Federal Airfield as a tenant activity named Naval Air Facility Santa Clara. Upon the inactivation of VP-91, RESPATWINGPAC/PATWING FOUR and the inactivation of all but one remaining Pacific Fleet Reserve VP squadron, operational control/administrative control (OPCON/ADCON) of VP-69 was passed to Commander, Patrol and Reconnaissance Wing Ten.

== See also ==
- U.S. Seventh Fleet Korean War order of battle
- List of United States Navy aircraft wings
