= Korean War order of battle: United States Seventh Fleet =

The US Navy Seventh Fleet saw service in the Korean War. This is the United States Seventh Fleet Korean War order of battle:

- Task Force 70
  - Task Group 70.6 Fleet Air Wing One
    - VP-1 7 August 1950 – 13 November 1950; April 1951 – 29 August 1951
    - VP-6 27 July 1951 – 15 January 1952
    - VP-28 14 July 1950 – 10 August 1950; 28 March 1951 – 11 October 1951; 26 May 1952 – 1 December 1952
    - VP-28 Detachment Able 11 October 1951 – 13 December 1951
    - VP-42 19 July 1950 – 10 August 1950
    - VP-46 1 December 1950 – 6 February 1951
    - VP-47 Detachment 7 July 1950 – 1 January 1951
    - VP-731 7 February 1951 – 13 August 1951
    - VP-892 12 February 1952 – 18 September 1952
  - Fleet Air Wing Six 4 August 1950 – End of war
    - VP-1 29 March 1952 – 5 October 1952; 27 May 1953 – End of war
    - VP-2 1 August 1951 – 2 December 1951
    - VP-6 7 July 1950 – 12 February 1951
    - VP-7 28 June 1953 – End of war
    - VP-9 27 June 1952 – 3 January 1953
    - VP-17 4 February 1953 – 1 August 1953
    - VP-29 27 September 1952 – 5 April 1953
    - VP-40 15 May 1951 – 12 December 1951
    - VP-42 11 August 1950 – 9 April 1951; 22 November 1951 – 11 June 1952
    - VP-46 25 September 1951 – 2 April 1952; 1 March 1953 – End of war
    - VP-47 Detachment 7 July 1950 – 1 January 1951; 26 July 1951 – 4 March 1952; 22 November 1952 – 1 June 1953
    - VP-50 Detachment 1 June 1953 – End of war
    - VP-731 29 May 1952 – 8 December 1952
    - VP-772 1 January 1951 – 3 August 1951
    - VP-871 October 1951 – 7 July 1952
    - VP-892 23 November 1950 – 9 June 1951
    - No. 88 Squadron RAF Detachment
    - No. 205 Squadron RAF Detachment
    - No. 209 Squadron RAF Detachment
- Task Force 72 Formosa Patrol 12 September 1950
- Task Force 77
  - Carrier Division One (USN)
    - USS Essex 18 August 1951 – 7 March 1952
      - US Air Group Five
  - Carrier Division Three (USN)
  - Carrier Division Five
    - USS Essex 26 June 1951 – 25 March 1952; 16 June 1952 – 6 February 1953
    - USS Boxer 24 August 1950 – 11 November 1950; 2 March 1951 – 24 October 1951; 8 February 1952 – 26 September 1952; 30 March 1953 – End of war
    - USS Bon Homme Richard 10 May 1951 – 17 December 1951; 20 May 1952 – 8 January 1953
    - USS Leyte 6 September 1950 – 3 February 1951
    - USS Kearsarge 11 August 1952 – 17 March 1953
    - USS Oriskany 15 September 1952 – 18 May 1953
    - USS Antietam 8 September 1951 – 2 May 1952
    - USS Princeton 9 November 1950 – 29 May 1951; 31 May 1951 – 29 August 1951; 21 March 1952 – 3 November 1952; 24 January 1953 – End of war
    - USS Lake Champlain 26 April 1953 – End of war
    - USS Valley Forge 25 June 1950 – 1 December 1950; 6 December 1950 – 7 April 1951; 15 October 1951 – 3 July 1952; 20 November 1952 – 25 June 1953
    - USS Philippine Sea 5 July 1950 – 26 March 1951; 28 March 1951 – 9 June 1951; 31 December 1951 – 8 August 1952; 15 December 1952 – End of war
    - USS Bataan 16 November 1950 – 25 June 1951; 27 January 1952 – 26 August 1952; 28 October 1952 – 26 May 1953
  - Cruiser Division One
  - Cruiser Division Three
  - Cruiser Division Five
  - Task Group 77.3 Formosa Patrol 20 July 1950 – 11 September 1950
  - Task Group 77.7 Replenishment Group
- Task Force 79 Service Squadron 3 21 July 1950
