= VP-65 =

Patrol Squadron 65
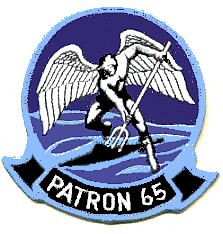
- VP-65 patch
- Active: 1 November 1970-4 March 2006
- Country: United States of America
- Branch: United States Navy Reserve
- Type: squadron
- Role: Maritime patrol
- Nickname(s): Tridents

Aircraft flown
- Patrol: SP-2H Neptune; P-3A/B/C Orion

VP-65, nicknamed the Tridents, was a Patrol Squadron of the U.S. Navy Reserve. The squadron was established on 16 November 1970 at NAS Los Alamitos, California, and moved on 6 January 1971 to NAS Point Mugu. It was disestablished on 4 March 2006, after 35 years of service. Elements of the squadron made 22 major overseas deployments.

== Operational history ==
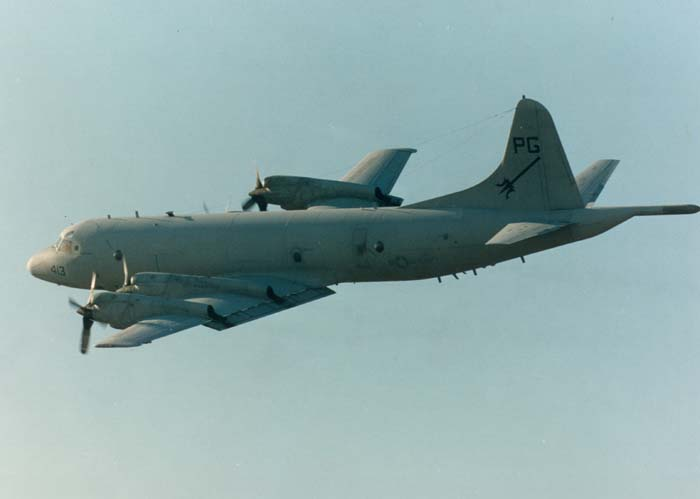
VP-65 P-3C c.1995

- 16 Nov 1970: VP-65 was established at NAS Los Alamitos, California, as a result of a major reorganization of the Naval Air Reserve that took place in 1970. The 12 Reserve squadrons formed were structured along the lines of regular Navy squadrons with nearly identical organization and manning levels. The reorganization concept was known as 12/2/1. There were 12 VP squadrons under two commands, Commander Fleet Air Reserve Wings Atlantic and Commander Fleet Air Reserve Wings Pacific, under the control of one central authority, Commander Naval Air Reserve. VP-65 was formed from the personnel and assets of seven smaller units already in existence at NAS Los Alamitos: VP-65L1-L3, VP-22L7, VP-19L4, VP-6L5, and VP-40L6. It came under the operational and administrative control of Fleet Air Reserve Wing, Pacific. The squadron's first assigned aircraft was the SP-2H Neptune.
- 18–30 May 1971: VP-65 participated in Operation Condeca Aguila II with Guatemala to evaluate the joint forces’ ability to detect, identify and thwart seaborne aggressor efforts.
- 1–13 June 1972: VP-65 and VP-67 participated in exercises Halcon Vista VII and Condeca Aguila III with the Nicaraguan military forces.
- 21 Jul–5 Aug 1973: VP-65 deployed to NAS Barbers Point, Hawaii, for mining and antisubmarine warfare (ASW) exercises.
- October 1974: The squadron's last SP-2H was officially transferred to the National Naval Aviation Museum at Pensacola, Florida.
- January 1975: VP-65 received its first P-3A Orion.
- August 1975: VP-65 deployed a detachment to NAS Agana, Guam, while operational training in the P-3 airframe continued for the remaining aircrews at NAS Point Mugu.
- June 1978: VP-65 deployed to NAS Agana, Guam, with detachments conducting maritime air patrol flights from NAS Cubi Point, Philippines, and Kadena AFB, Okinawa. One of the Cubi detachment aircraft, flown by PPC Lieutenant Commander F. Kluessendorf, experienced an engine failure during the takeoff roll on rotation. The propeller autofeather feature of the Orion aircraft prevented any instability during the takeoff, allowing the crew to safely return to Cubi for an uneventful landing.
- 1980: VP-65 deployed for its active duty training to NAS Agana, Guam and the Philippines, with detachments at Okinawa and Singapore searching for Vietnamese boat people.
- 25 June–29 July 1982: VP-65 deployed to NAS Cubi Point, Philippines, with operations conducted from Singapore, Okinawa, Guam and Thailand.
- 14 May–Jun 1984: VP-65 deployed to NAF Misawa, Japan. The squadron aircrews received real-world training flying missions covering Soviet Bloc submarines transiting the WestPac theater of operations.
- 31 May–30 June 1985: VP-65 deployed to NAF Misawa, Japan. Upon return from deployment the squadron began the ground training necessary for the transition from the P-3A to the P-3B TAC/NAV/MOD airframe. The IRDS/HACLS modifications added infrared detection and Harpoon launch capability to the aircraft.
- November 1986: VP-65 received a letter of commendation from the Secretary of the Navy for the squadron's role in Operation Close, a coordinated operation with the U. S. Coast Guard in support of their drug interdiction efforts.
- July–August 1989: VP-65 conducted active duty training at NAF Misawa, Japan. The squadron participated with fleet squadrons VPs 19 and 46 in support of TF 72. Out of 1,015 hours flown during the deployment, over 52 hours were flown while in direct contact with Soviet Bloc submarines.
- June 1991: VP-65 deployed to NAF Kadena, Okinawa. Upon return from deployment the squadron began the transition from the P-3B MOD airframe to the P-3C Orion. The baseline P-3C incorporated the AN/ASQ-114 computer system for navigation and sensor functions, the first of its kind in a maritime patrol aircraft. It had an AN/AQA-7 Jezebel acoustic processing system with DIFAR and quadruple the number of directional sonobuoys, with a high capacity computer and related displays. Completion of transition training was accomplished by June 1993.
- 13–27 August 1993: Two VP-65 aircrews deployed to Naval Air Facility Adak, Alaska, the last operational detachment to fly from the air station before it went into caretaker status.
- January 1994: VP-65 began transition to the P-3C UII.5 Orion airframe. Update II.5 had improved electronics systems, new Integrated Acoustic Communication System (IACS), improved MAD, standardized wing pylons and improved wing fuel tank venting. Throughout the remainder of the year, detachments from VP-65 deployed to NAF Kadena, Japan; NAS North Island, California; and NAS Barbers Point, as part of the increased integration of reserves into active duty Navy operations and exercises under CTF-72.
- 1995: VP-65 detachments deployed at various times throughout the year to NAS North Island, Calif.; NAF Misawa, Japan; Biggs Army Airfield, El Paso, Texas; NAF Kadena, Okinawa; U-Tapao Royal Thai Navy Airfield, Thailand; and Naval Station Roosevelt Roads, Puerto Rico.

== Aircraft assignment ==
The squadron first received the following aircraft on the dates shown:

- SP-2H Neptune – November 1970
- P-3A Orion – January 1975
- P-3B TAC/NAV MOD Orion – December 1985
- P-3C Orion – May 1991
- P-3C UII.5 Orion – January 1994

== See also ==
- Maritime patrol aircraft
- List of Lockheed P-3 Orion variants
- List of inactive United States Navy aircraft squadrons
- List of United States Navy aircraft squadrons
- List of squadrons in the Dictionary of American Naval Aviation Squadrons
- History of the United States Navy
