= VP-94 =

Patrol Squadron 94
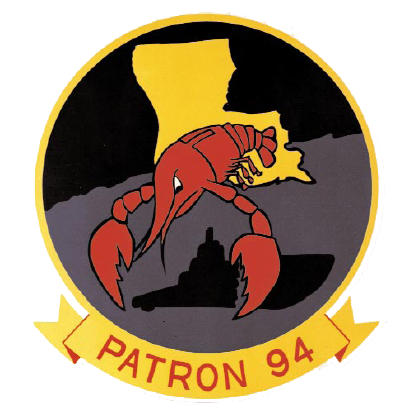
- VP-94 patch
- Active: 1 November 1970 - September 2006
- Country: United States of America
- Branch: United States Navy Reserve
- Type: squadron
- Role: Maritime patrol
- Nickname(s): Crawfishers

Aircraft flown
- Patrol: SP-2H Neptune; P-3A/B/C Orion

VP-94 Crawfishers was a Patrol Squadron of the U.S. Navy Reserve. Originally established on 1 November 1970 at NAS Belle Chase, Louisiana, it was disestablished in September 2006. It was the second squadron to be designated VP-94, the first VP-94 was redesignated VPB-94 on 1 October 1944.

== Operational history ==
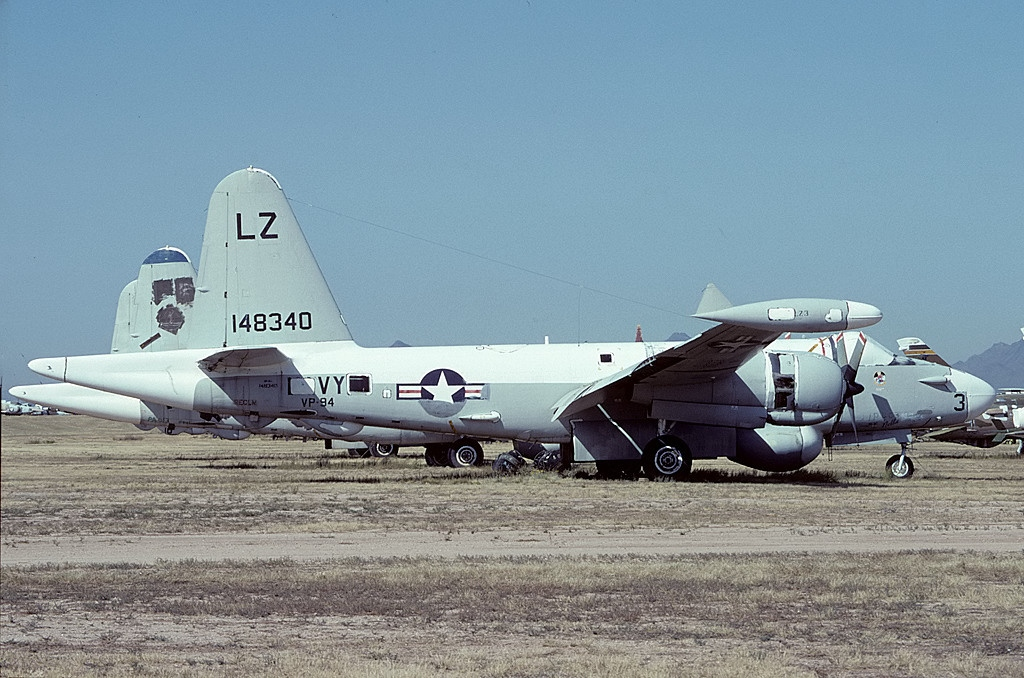
Former VP-94 SP-2H at AMARC in 1992

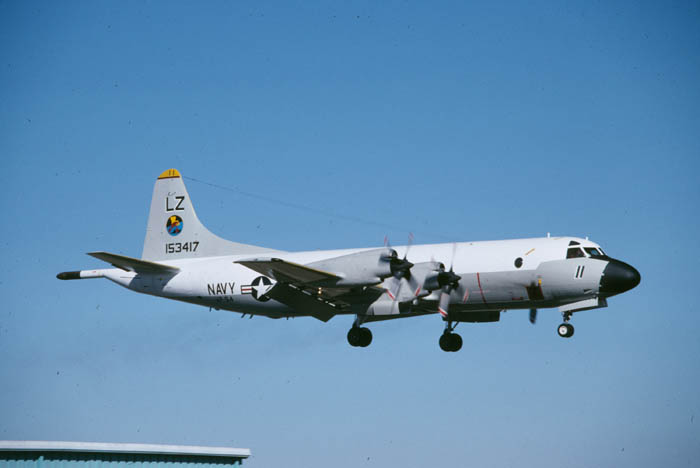
VP-94 P-3B landing at NAS Dallas in February 1986

VP-94 was initially established on 1 November 1970 at NAS Belle Chase, as a Naval Air Reserve landbased patrol squadron flying 12 SP-2H Neptunes. VP-94 was formed from VP-821 and VP-822, both established in 1965. These squadrons were redesignated VP-61X1 and VP-45X2 in May 1968, and were combined in November 1970 to form VP-94. The new squadron came under the operational and administrative control of the Commander, Naval Air Reserve Force. VP-94 was established as a result of a major reorganization of the Naval Air Reserve that took place in mid-1970. Under the Reserve Force Squadron concept 12 land-based naval reserve patrol squadrons were formed and structured along the lines of regular Navy squadrons with nearly identical organization and manning levels. Under the 12/2/1 concept there were 12 VP squadrons divided between two commands, COMFAIRESWINGLANT and COMFAIRESWINGPAC. These two commands came under the control of one central authority, Commander Naval Air Reserve.

In March 1989, the Department of Defense organized Operation Hat Trick III, an exercise employing the efforts of several reserve patrol squadrons, staging at Roosevelt Roads Naval Station, Puerto Rico. This operation, the largest drug interdiction operation using reserve forces to date, resulted in the capture of a record number of narcotics carrying vessels and aircraft. After the success of this operation, Atlantic reserve patrol squadrons routinely devoted a portion of their two-week ACDUTRA time each year on drug interdiction patrols with the United States Coast Guard based out of NS Roosevelt Roads and NAS Key West, Florida Reserve and active duty Navy patrol squadrons had previously assisted the Coast Guard in drug interdiction flights in the Caribbean area since 1985.

On 2 January 1993 VP-94 was assigned to CTF 67.1 at NAS Sigonella, Sicily, and CTF 67.2 at Naval Base Rota, Spain, in support of Adriatic Sea embargo flights for Operation Maritime Guard against the former Republic of Yugoslavia. These were armed flights carrying Harpoon antiship missiles. The missions were flown in support of UN operations to enforce the cease-fire between warring factions of Bosnia, Serbia and Croatia and to prevent outside factions from providing re-supply by sea. From June–July 1993 the squadron supplied detachments for Operation Sharp Guard in support of UN operations. This concept of separate detachment deployments, rather than entire unit deployments, became known as flexible detachment operations, or Det Ops. This form of deployment provided the maximum amount of interoperability between USN and USNR forward deployed forces, while supporting real operations and not just training flights for the Reserves. Reserve Det Ops also served as a much-needed supplement to the active-duty patrol squadrons in an era of post-Cold War cutbacks.

In October 1993 a Det Ops deployment was conducted to NS Roosevelt Roads, to provide support for operations Uphold Democracy and Able Mariner, the UN sanctioned embargo of Haiti.

VP-94 was one of 13 Reserve patrol squadrons assigned to Reserve Patrol Wing Atlantic (RESPATWINGLANT) and Reserve Patrol Wing Pacific/Patrol Wing FOUR (RESPATWINGPAC/PatWing 4) under the operational control of Naval Air Reserve Force (NAVAIRESFOR), later redesignated as Naval Air Force Reserve (NAVAIRES). All Naval Reserve Force Squadrons, patrol, fighter, fighter/attack, etc., are/were colloquially referred to as Reserve Force Squadrons, or RESFORONS, staffed by a combination of full-time active duty Training and Administration of the Reserve/Full Time Support (TAR/FTS) and traditional part-time Selected Reserve (SELRES) personnel. TAR/FTS personnel nominally comprised approximately 33% of these squadrons' manning and SELRES approximately 67%. The squadron's part-time personnel, especially the aircrews, were required and funded to perform far more than the typical one weekend a month and two weeks a year of duty, with many averaging 120 or more man-days of military duty annually.

Following the demise of the Soviet Union, and the reduction in Russian naval activity, and the perceived "Peace Dividend" of the mid-1990s, much of the US Navy's P-3 patrol aircraft fleet was subjected to budgetary reductions. In the case of the active duty P-3 fleet, the entire patrol aviation (VP) community was reduced by 50%, going from 24 deployable P-3C fleet squadrons and two fleet replacement squadrons, to 12 deployable P-3C fleet squadrons and one single-site fleet replacement squadron. The Reserve VP community of 13 P-3B and P-3C squadrons was subjected to more drastic reductions. VP-94 was one of 11 Reserve VP squadrons disestablished to cut costs. Eliminated were all squadrons operating P-3B aircraft, which were retired to AMARC, and eliminating all but two Reserve P-3C squadrons, transferring the bulk of the Reserve P-3C aircraft to the Regular Navy at the principal active duty P-3 bases. VP-94 was disestablished in September 2006.

== Aircraft assignment ==
The squadron first received the following aircraft on the dates shown:

- SP-2H Neptune – November 1970
- P-3A Orion – October 1976
- P-3B TAC/NAV MOD Orion – September 1984
- P-3C UII.5 Orion – September 1994

== See also ==
- Maritime patrol aircraft
- List of inactive United States Navy aircraft squadrons
- List of United States Navy aircraft squadrons
- List of squadrons in the Dictionary of American Naval Aviation Squadrons
- History of the United States Navy
