= VP-62 =

Patrol Squadron 62
- Active: 1 May 1942 – 1 July 1943
- Country: United States of America
- Branch: United States Navy
- Type: squadron
- Role: Maritime patrol
- Engagements: World War II

Aircraft flown
- Patrol: PBY-5A

VP-62 was a Patrol Squadron of the U.S. Navy. The squadron was established as Patrol Squadron 62 (VP-62) on 1 May 1942 and disestablished on 1 July 1943.

== Operational history ==
- 1 May 1942: VP-62 was established at NAS Alameda, California, under the operational control of FAW14, as a seaplane squadron flying the PBY-5A Catalina. Training continued at Alameda through early July 1942.
- 19–26 July 1942: VP-62 departed NAS Alameda for NAS Kodiak, Alaska. After reporting for duty to FAW-4, the squadron was ordered to Cold Bay, Alaska, where the squadron became operational on 26 July 1942.
- 5 September 1942: VP-62 was relocated to Dutch Harbor with a detachment at Umnak, Alaska. At Dutch Harbor the squadron relieved VP-41 and joined the 12 PBYs of VP-42 in conducting sector searches and anti-shipping patrols. The Japanese navy had occupied Attu and Kiska on 7 June 1942, putting Dutch Harbor right on the firing line. Most of the squadron aircraft were equipped with the often unreliable ASV Mark II radar. Due to the presence of enemy fighter aircraft, patrols had to be flown with takeoffs just before sunset and relying on radar for contacts.
- November 1942: VP-62 was relieved and returned to NAS Seattle, Washington, for overhaul of the squadron aircraft and crew leave. During this period the squadron came under the operational control of FAW-6. The squadron departed Seattle in mid-December for NAS Adak, Alaska.
- December 1942: VP-62 reported aboard at NAS Adak, coming under the operational control of FAW-4. The squadron deployed a detachment to Amchitka and conducted offensive patrols along the Aleutians.
- June 1943: VP-62 was relieved for return to NAS Whidbey Island, Washington. Upon arrival, squadron personnel were given orders and home leave.
- 1 July 1943: VP-62 was disestablished at NAS Whidbey Island.

== Aircraft assignments ==
The squadron was assigned the following aircraft, effective on the dates shown:

- PBY-5A - May 1942

== Home port assignments ==
The squadron was assigned to these home ports, effective on the dates shown:

- NAS Alameda, California - 1 May 1942
- NAS Seattle, Washington - November 1942
- NAS Whidbey Island, Washington - June 1943

== See also ==
- Maritime patrol aircraft
- List of inactive United States Navy aircraft squadrons
- List of United States Navy aircraft squadrons
- List of squadrons in the Dictionary of American Naval Aviation Squadrons
- History of the United States Navy
