= VUP-19 =

UAV squadron of the US Navy

Unmanned Patrol Squadron 19
- VUP-19 Insignia
- Active: 4 July 1946 – 31 August 1991; 1 October 2013-
- Country: United States of America
- Branch: United States Navy
- Type: squadron
- Role: Maritime patrol
- Part of: Patrol and Reconnaissance Wing 11
- Garrison/HQ: Naval Air Station Jacksonville, Florida
- Nickname(s): Big Red
- Engagements: Korean War; Vietnam War

Aircraft flown
- Patrol: PV-2 Harpoon; PBY-5A/6A Catalina; P-2 Neptune; P4Y-2/2S Privateer; P-3 Orion; Northrop Grumman MQ-4C Triton

Unmanned Patrol Squadron ONE NINE (VUP-19) is an unmanned patrol squadron of the United States Navy, nicknamed the "Big Red" and established on 1 October 2013.

The squadron was originally established as Reserve Patrol Squadron 907 (VP-907) on 4 July 1946, redesignated Medium Patrol Squadron 57 (VP-ML-57) on 15 November 1946, redesignated VP-871 in February 1950, redesignated VP-19 on 4 February 1953 and disestablished on 31 August 1991. It was the third squadron to be designated VP-19, the first VP-19 was redesignated VP-43 on 1 July 1939 and the second VP-19 was redesignated VPB-19 on 1 October 1944.

"Unmanned Patrol Squadron ONE NINE (VUP-19) was established on October 1st 2013 and was later commissioned on October 28th 2016. As the United States Navy’s first uninhibited maritime patrol squadron, VUP-19 is a team of more than 500 active duty, reserve, and civilian personnel which draws its lineage from and honors the rich history of Patrol Squadron ONE NINE (VP-19) “Big Red” originally established in July 1946 as VP-907."

== History 1946 - 1991 ==
- May 1946: VP-907 was established at Naval Air Station Livermore, California. The squadron came under the operational control of Fleet Air Wing 4, Pacific Fleet, and administrative control by the Naval Air Reserve Training Unit. The squadron was one of the 21 Naval Air Reserve squadrons established after the war to accommodate the large number of aircrews recently released from active duty and to utilize the enormous stocks of aircraft in the inventory. The squadron flew the PV-2 Harpoon, and the amphibious PBY-5A and PBY-6A Catalina.
- 15 November 1946: All patrol squadrons were redesignated. Regular Navy squadron designation numbers began with 1 and reserve squadron numbers began with 5. VP-907 was redesignated VP-ML-57. The ML, medium patrol squadrons, included twin-engine medium amphibious seaplanes, as well as twin-engine land-based bombers. Regular Navy patrol squadrons with the ML designation were for twin-engine medium land-based bombers only. The amphibious medium seaplanes like the PBY-5A used the AM amphibian designation for regular Navy patrol squadrons.
- February 1950: The personnel and assets of VP-ML-57 and VP-ML-72 were merged and redesignated VP-871 during the reorganization of Naval Aviation reserve units in 1949, the effective date for this action was February 1950. During this period the number of naval aviation reserve squadrons was reduced from the 1949 total of 24 to 9. The squadron transitioned to the P2V-2 Neptune during this period.
- 1 March 1951: VP-871 was recalled to active duty for service during the Korean War. The squadron relocated from its home base at Oakland, California, to NAS Alameda, California. Aircrews were given transition training for conversion to the P4Y-2/2S Privateer. The 2S version of this aircraft featured surface search radar.
- October 1951–July 1952: On its first deployment to NAS Atsugi, Japan in October, VP-871 conducted shipping surveillance over the Sea of Japan. On 12 December 1952, the squadron formed a detachment that operated from Kimpo AFB, South Korea, to provide night interdiction missions in support of United States Marine Corps night fighter squadrons in Korea. The squadron received its nickname, "Big Red," for dropping red night illumination flares (150 Mk-6 flares per mission) for allied air and ground units. Upon its return from Japan in July 1952, the squadron began the transition to P2V-2 and-3 model Neptunes.
- January–July 1953: VP-871 deployed to Naval Air Station Agana, Guam. Toward the end of the Korean War the decision was made to establish all nine reserve patrol squadrons activated during the 1950 to 1951 time period as part of the Regular Navy. On 4 February 1953, VP-871 was redesignated VP-19. The redesignations did not require changes in tail codes or home bases. After returning to NAS Alameda in July 1953, the squadron commenced transition to the P2V-5 Neptune.
- 4 September 1954: During the squadron’s deployment to NAS Atsugi, Japan, one of the squadron’s P2V-5 aircraft on a routine ECM and weather surveillance flight over the Sea of Japan, 40 miles (60 kilometers) off the coast of Siberia, was attacked and set on fire by two Soviet MiG-15 aircraft. The Neptune ditched successfully at sea, and all hands except for the navigator were able to exit the sinking aircraft and climb aboard a life raft. A USAF SA-16 amphibian picked the aircrew up the next day. Ensign R. H. Reid, the missing crew member, was posthumously awarded the Navy and Marine Corps Medal.
- 1 August 1955: VP-19 received the first of its new Lockheed P2V-7 Neptunes with improved electronics, cockpit and enlarged bomb bays.
- May 1957: VP-19 deployed to NAS Kodiak, Alaska, with detachments at Naval Air Facility Adak and Ladd Air Force Base in Fairbanks, Alaska. In five brief months, the squadron spotted 169 Russian ships. This compared with previous sightings in the Alaskan Sea Frontier of 92 Russian ships over a full year.

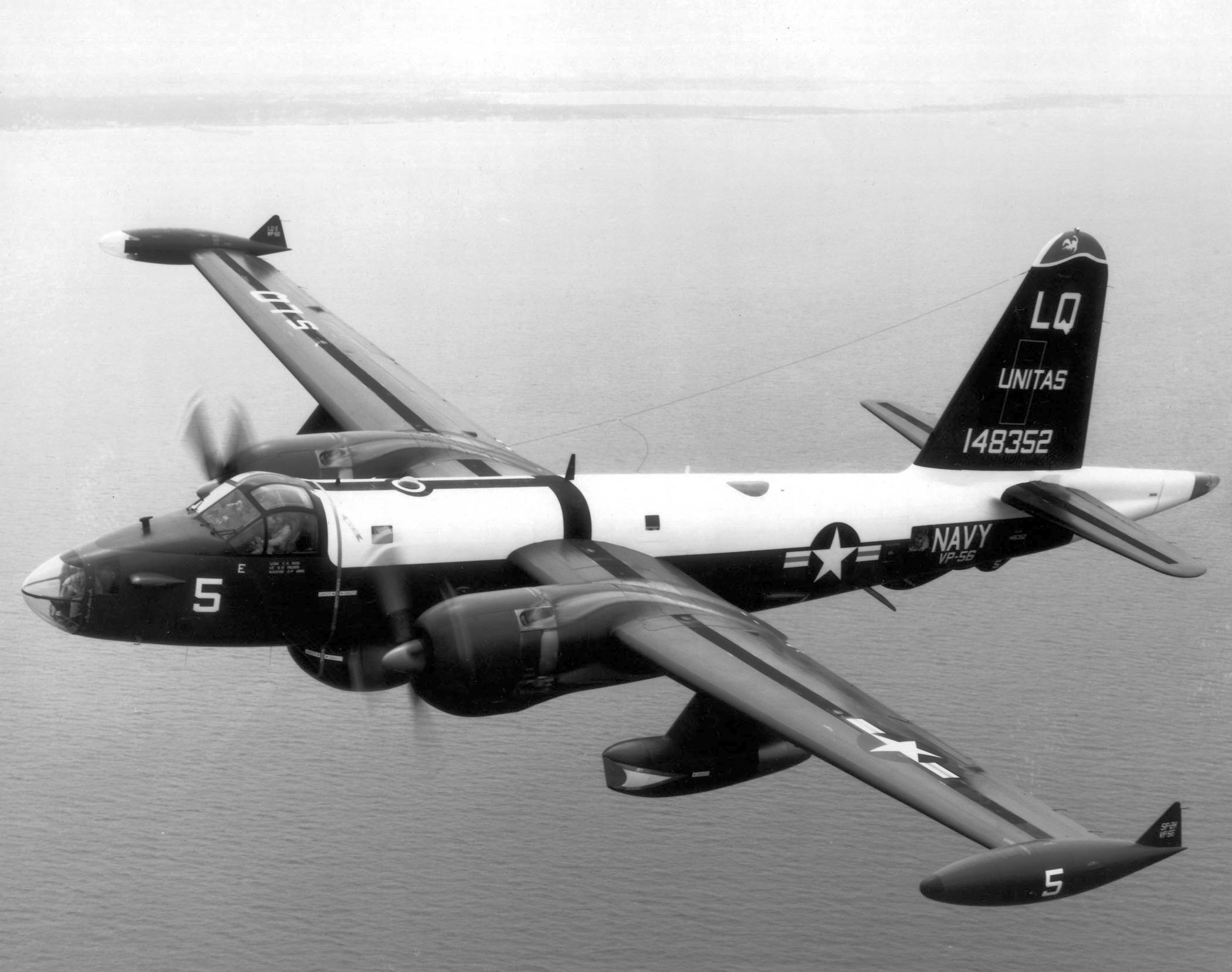
A P2V-7 similar to this one severed with Squadron PV-18

- 10 May 1960: VP-19 deployed to NAS Kodiak, Alaska. During the deployment the squadron conducted operational bombing exercises by breaking up ice covered rivers that were causing flooding along the Yukon River.
- 1 August 1961: The squadron conducted weekly mail drops to ships of radar picket squadrons in the Pacific. This operation provided training for the squadron in locating ships at sea.
- 23 October 1964–July 1965: VP-19 deployed to NAS Adak, Alaska, the first winter deployment of a P-3A Orion squadron to Adak, and one of the longest for a patrol squadron to date. The tour was to test out the newly delivered P-3As for performance in cold weather. The squadron was relieved by VP-45 in July 1965.
- 9 April 1966: A squadron P-3A, Modex PE-4, BuNo 152171, was lost off the coast of Baja California, while engaged in an ASW training flight. All 11 members of the flight crew were killed.
- 4 July 1966: The squadron Combat Air Crew #6 of P-3A, Modex PE-5, BuNo 152172, was lost on a cross-country training flight near Battle Creek, Michigan. All four members of the flight crew were killed.
- 1 August 1966: The squadron deployed to Marine Corps Air Station Iwakuni, Japan. Various detachments conducted Operation Market Time patrols over the South China Sea off the coast of Vietnam, marking the first deployment of the squadron to a combat zone since the Korean War.
- 1 February–June 1968: VP-19 deployed to MCAS Iwakuni, Japan, under the operational control of Fleet Air Wing SIX (FAW-6). Upon arrival, the squadron was put on alert due to the seizure of the intelligence ship USS Pueblo on 23 January 1968 by the North Korean Navy. Through the end of February the squadron flew more than 1,500 hours in support of the surveillance of North Korea waters as part of Operation Formation Star. In April, the squadron flew missions in support of operations in Vietnam, with detachments at Guam; Naval Station Sangley Point, Philippines; U-Tapao Royal Thai Navy Airfield, Thailand; and Iwakuni. In June, operations shifted to Cam Ranh Bay Air Base, Vietnam.
- 28 May 1969: VP-19 deployed to NAS Adak, Alaska. During the deployment the squadron provided support for the Atomic Energy Commission (AEC) conducting nuclear weapons testing in the vicinity of Amchitka Island. The squadron earned a Meritorious Unit Commendation for its support of the AEC.
- 26 July 1970: VP-19 deployed to MCAS Iwakuni, Japan. Three crews were detached for duty at Cam Ranh Bay, Vietnam, in support of Market Time operations. Activities during the deployment earned the squadron its second Meritorious Unit Commendation.
- 1 November 1971: VP-19 deployed to Naval Air Station Cubi Point, Philippines, with a detachment at U-Tapao Royal Thai Navy Airfield, Thailand. This would mark the squadron’s fourth and final tour in the Vietnam theater of operations.
- 1 August 1973: Ensign Beverly A. Burns, USNR, reported aboard VP-19 at Naha, Okinawa, as the first female officer to be assigned to an operational squadron in the Pacific Fleet. Ensign Burns joined the squadron as a non-flying officer filling a ground officer billet.
- 23 October 1974: The squadron deployed to WestPac at NAS Cubi Point, Philippines. During the deployment the squadron participated in Valiant Heritage, the largest Pacific Fleet readiness exercise in the North Pacific since World War II.
- 18–30 April 1975: The squadron was tasked with SAR missions as part of Operation Frequent Wind, the evacuation of American citizens from Saigon.
- 5 May 1976: VP-19 deployed to NAS Adak, Alaska. VP-19 was the first patrol squadron to operate the new P-3C UI at the detachment site.
- 1 January 1977: VP-19 deployed to Adak, Alaska. The deployment proved to be exceptional in the number of SAR missions the squadron was called upon to perform. A record 20 SAR missions were successfully completed, contributing to the awarding of the squadron’s second Battle Efficiency “E” award in its history.
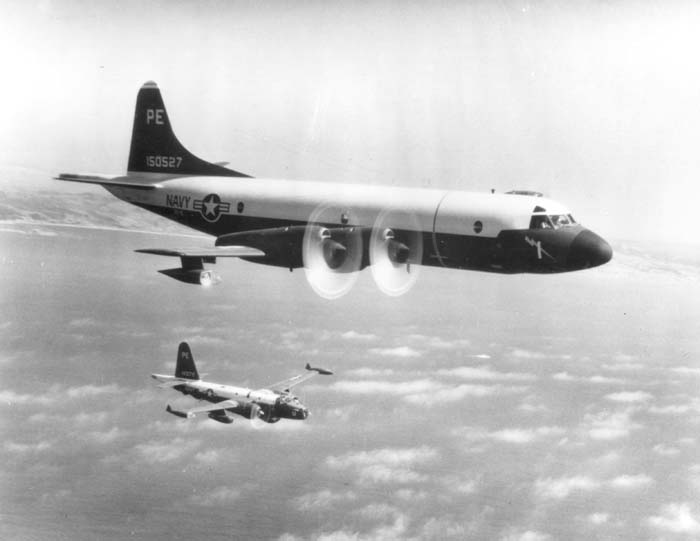
  VP-19 P-3A and P2V-7 c.1963
- May 1979: VP-19 completed a most arduous and highly successful six-month period of detachment operations in NAS Adak, Alaska. After returning home, VP-19 attained the highest Navy-wide score on the delivery portion of the Mine Readiness Certification Inspection (CRCI), and completed its fifth consecutive no discrepancy Navy Technical Proficiency Inspection (NTPI).
- 28 December 1979: VP-19 deployed to NAF Misawa, Japan. The squadron participated in operations to rescue Vietnamese boat people, as authorized by the President on 19 July 1979. By May 1980, over 2,500 refugees had been rescued by elements of the Navy.
- July 1980: After completing the six-month deployment to NAS Misawa, Japan, VP-19 completed an unprecedented sixth consecutive no discrepancy NTPI, and a highly successful 3-month detachment to NAS Adak, Alaska.
- February 1982: After returning from its 6-month deployment to NAS Kadena, Okinawa, Japan, VP-19 completed yet another no discrepancy NTPI, established a new CPW-10 record in the MRCI (Aerial mining), and received an unprecedented four consecutive Silver Shutter awards for Aerial Intelligence Photography excellence. VP-19 was the first Patrol Squadron in the Pacific Fleet in recent years to fully maintain all ten of its flight crews in an "ALPHA" mission readiness status and kept the highest crew readiness statistics in PAC Fleet since July 1982.
- November 1982: During the squadron's 1982/1983 WESTPAC deployment to Misawa, Japan, VP-19 successfully tracked a record number of threat submarines gained International recognition during a Search and Rescue mission to the island nation of SRI LANKA. marked 14 years and 105,000 hours of accident-free operations, and provided unprecedented ASW support during "TAE KWON DO", "TEAM SPIRIT" and the largest military exercise in the North Pacific since World War II, "FLEETEX 83-1." The squadron created its eleventh flight crew, and became the first in several years in the Pac1flc to qualify all eleven crews "ALPHA." The squadrons effectiveness on this deployment was commended by CNO, COMNAVAlRPAC, COMSEVENTHFLT, COMFAlR, WESTPAC, COMPATWINGSPAC, COMPATRECONFORSEVENTHFLT, COMPAlWINGTEN and deployed COMCARGRUS and COMDESRONS.From 1980 thru 1985 VP-19 was awarded the Arnold J. Isabell Trophy for ASW Excellence; The Royal Air Force Coastal Command Trophy for ASW Excellence; and two consecutive (18 month term) US Navy Battle Efficiency "E" Awards as the most Combat Efficient all Pacific Fleet VP Squadrons.
- July 1987: The squadron split-deployed to NAF Diego Garcia and NAF Kadena, Okinawa. In October, a detachment of four aircraft was deployed to King Abdulaziz Air Base, Dhahran, Saudi Arabia, on orders from the Joint Chiefs of Staff. During deployment VP-19 flew support missions for five separate battle groups, including operations with the battleships USS Iowa and USS Missouri.
- July 1990: VP-19 became the first patrol squadron to ever fire a Mark 50 torpedo war shot. The addition of this weapon to the armory of the Orion greatly increased its offensive capabilities.
- August 1990–March 1991: VP-19 deployed to NAF Misawa, Japan. On 28 August, crew 4 and a squadron aircraft detached for duty to the Persian Gulf in support of Operation Desert Shield. Single crews rotated to the gulf to share this duty until December 1990, when three crews were sent forward in support of Operation Desert Storm. Additional detachments were maintained during the deployment at NAF Kadena, Okinawa; and Diego Garcia.
- 31 August 1991: VP-19 was disestablished as part of post-Cold War force reductions that eventually reduced the number of patrol squadrons in the Regular Navy by fifty percent and in the Naval Air Reserve by nearly 85%.

== Reestablishment as UAV unit ==
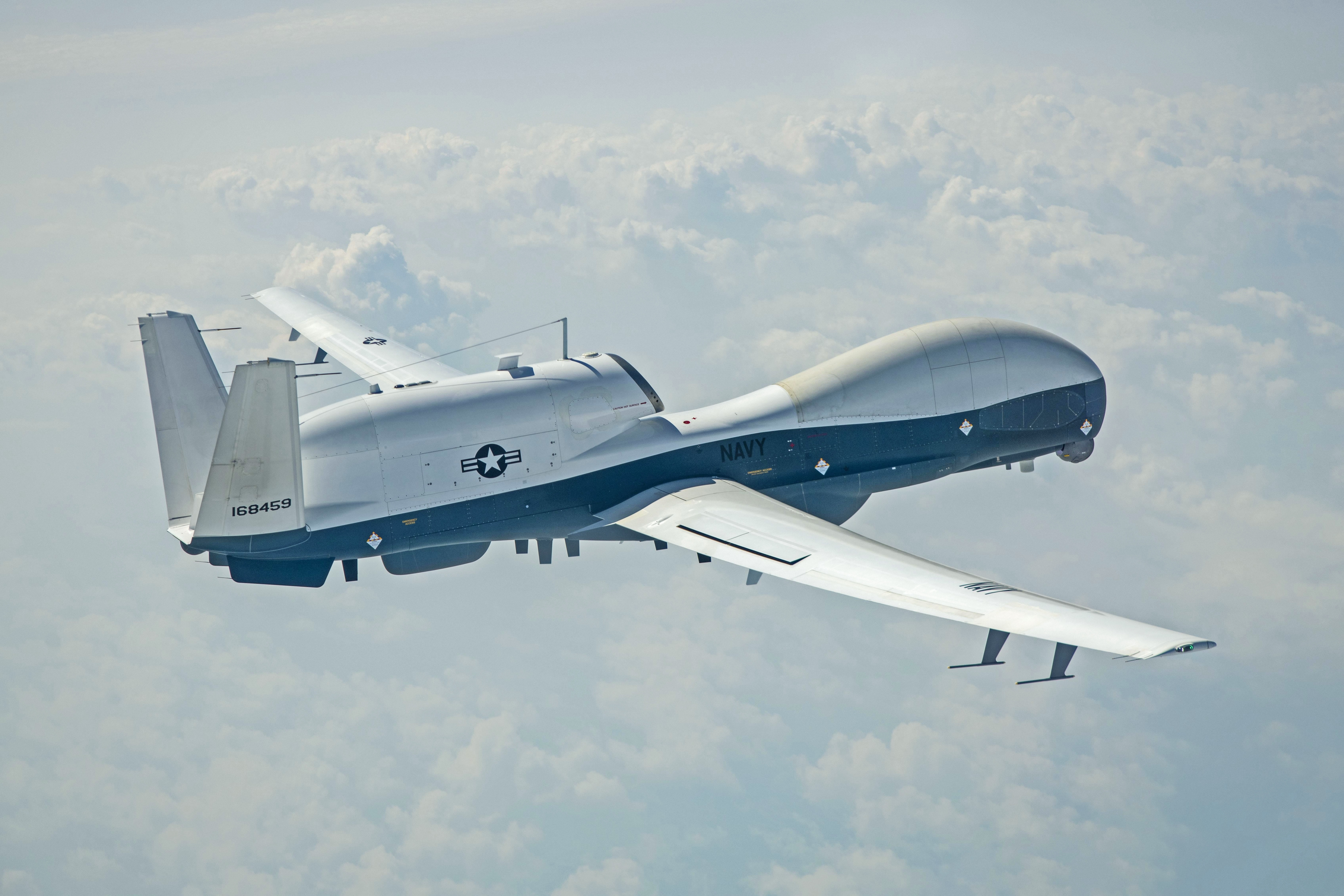
An MQ-4C conducting a flight test

On 7 February 2013 the Navy announced that it would stand up VUP-19 at NAS Jacksonville, Florida, in Fiscal Year 2014 to eventually operate the MQ-4C Triton. A detachment of VUP-19 would also be established at NAS Point Mugu, California.

VUP-19 falls under the administrative control of Commander, Patrol and Reconnaissance Wing 11 (CPRW-11) at NAS Jacksonville, where an MQ-4C mission control facility was constructed. It was planned to operate the Triton on intelligence, surveillance and reconnaissance (ISR) missions for the Fifth Fleet in the CENTCOM area of responsibility, the U.S. 6th Fleet in the Mediterranean and eastern Atlantic, the U.S. 7th Fleet in the Western Pacific and Indian Ocean, and U.S. Fleet Forces Command in the western Atlantic.

The Navy originally planned to activate a second Triton squadron, VUP-11, in 2014 to take over operations in the Pacific in support of U.S. 7th Fleet and share Fifth Fleet operations with VUP-19, but this has been delayed pending VUP-19 attaining initial operational capability. As of June 2018, VUP-19 has attained Early Operational Capability (EOC).

On 27 June 2018, VUP-19 launched its first Northrop Grumman MQ-4C Triton at Naval Base Ventura County. VUP-19 currently has two Tritons assigned to it, #168461 and #168460.

In 2017, the Navy announced that Naval Station Mayport, Florida would become a second location for VUP-19 MQ-4C aircraft basing and maintenance, with the first MQ-4C aircraft arriving on 16 December 2021.

The squadron's first detachment was at Andersen Air Force Base, Guam, the second was Naval Air Station Sigonella, Italy on March 2, 2024.

== Home port assignments ==
The squadron was assigned to these home stations, effective on the dates shown:

- Naval Air Station Livermore, California - May 1946
- NAS Alameda, California - 1 March 1951
- NAS Moffett Field, California - 1 September 1963
- NAS Jacksonville, Florida

== Aircraft assignment ==
The squadron first received the following aircraft on the dates shown:

- PV-2 May 1946
- PBY-5A/6A May 1946
- P2V-2 December 1949
- P4Y-2/2S March 1951
- P2V-2/3 March 1952
- P2V-5 July 1953
- P2V-7 August 1955
- P-3A July 1963
- P-3B June 1967
- P-3C Update I July 1975
- MQ-4C Triton 2018

== See also ==
- Maritime patrol aircraft
- Squadron (aviation)
- Naval aviation
- List of United States Navy aircraft squadrons
- History of the United States Navy
