= VP-56 =

Patrol Squadron 56
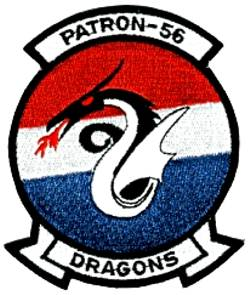
- VP-56 patch
- Active: 1 July 1946-28 June 1991
- Country: United States of America
- Branch: United States Navy
- Type: squadron
- Role: Maritime patrol
- Nickname(s): Dragons

Aircraft flown
- Patrol: PBY-5A Catalina; PV-2 Harpoon; PBM-5 Mariner; P5M Marlin; P2V-7/SP-2H Neptune; P-3B/C Orion

VP-56, nicknamed the Dragons, was a long-lived Patrol Squadron of the U.S. Navy. It was originally established as Patrol Squadron VP-900 on 1 July 1946, redesignated Medium Patrol Squadron (Landplane) VP-ML-71 on 15 November 1946, redesignated VP-661 in February 1950, redesignated VP-56 on 4 February 1953 and disestablished on 28 June 1991. It was the second squadron to be designated VP-56, the first VP-56 was redesignated OTS on 1 July 1941.

== Operational history ==
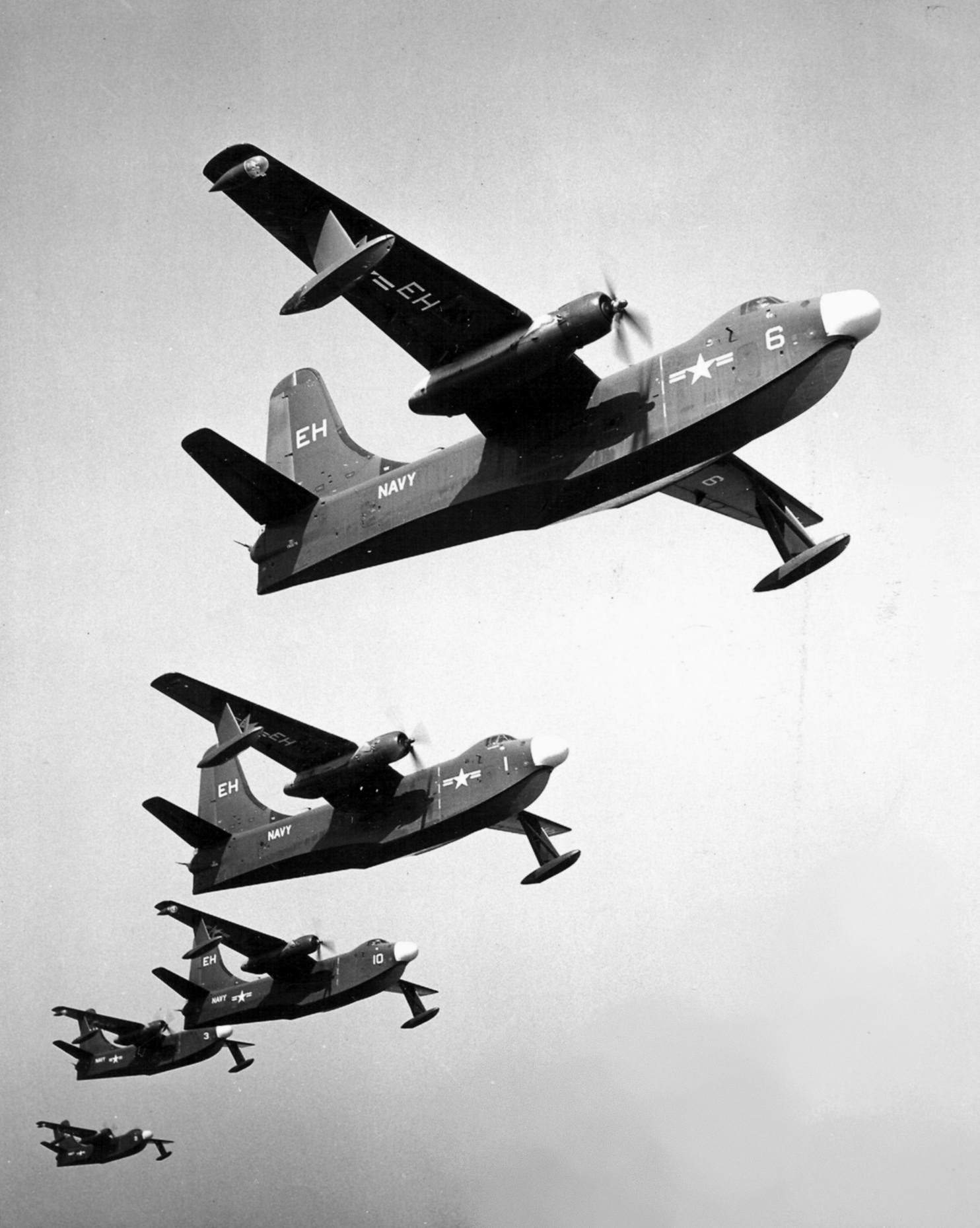
VP-56 P5M-1s c.1954

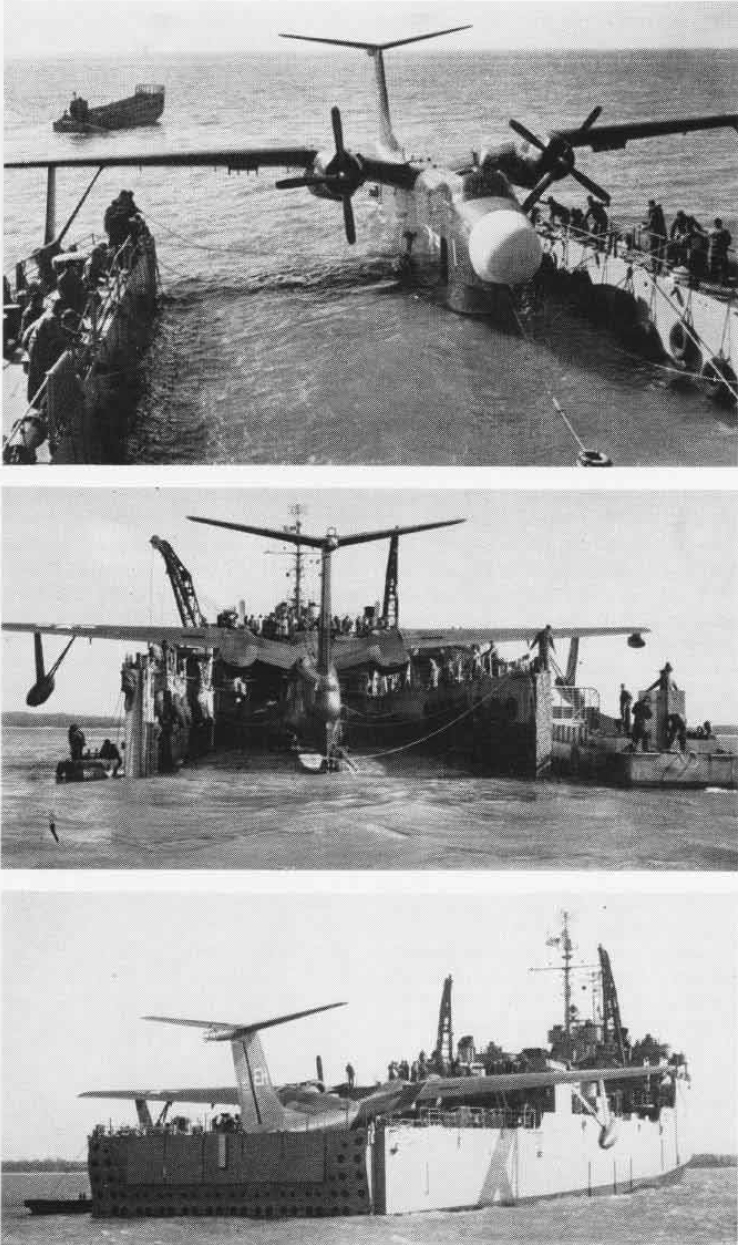
VP-56 P5M docks on USS Ashland in 1957

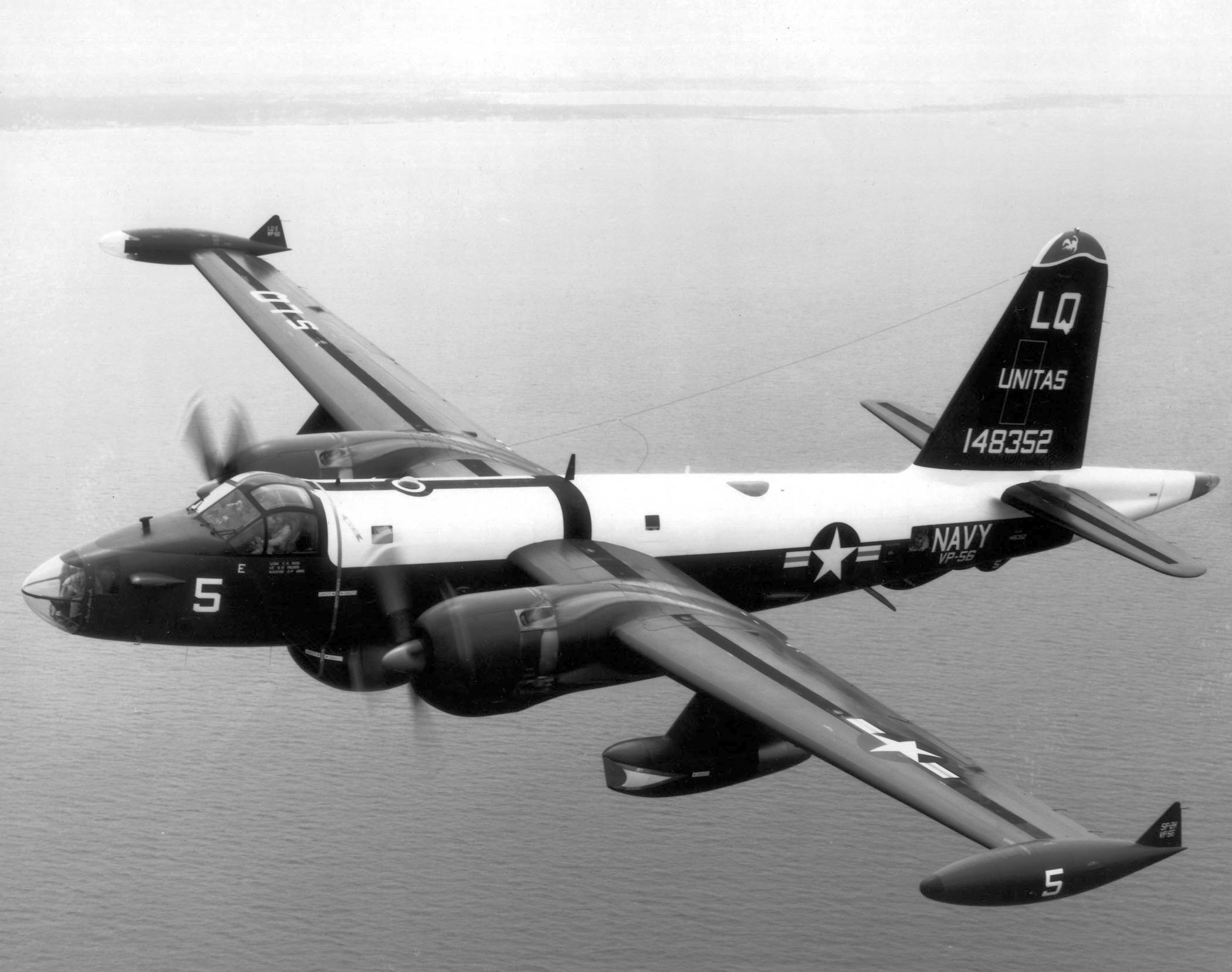
VP-56 P-2H in 1963

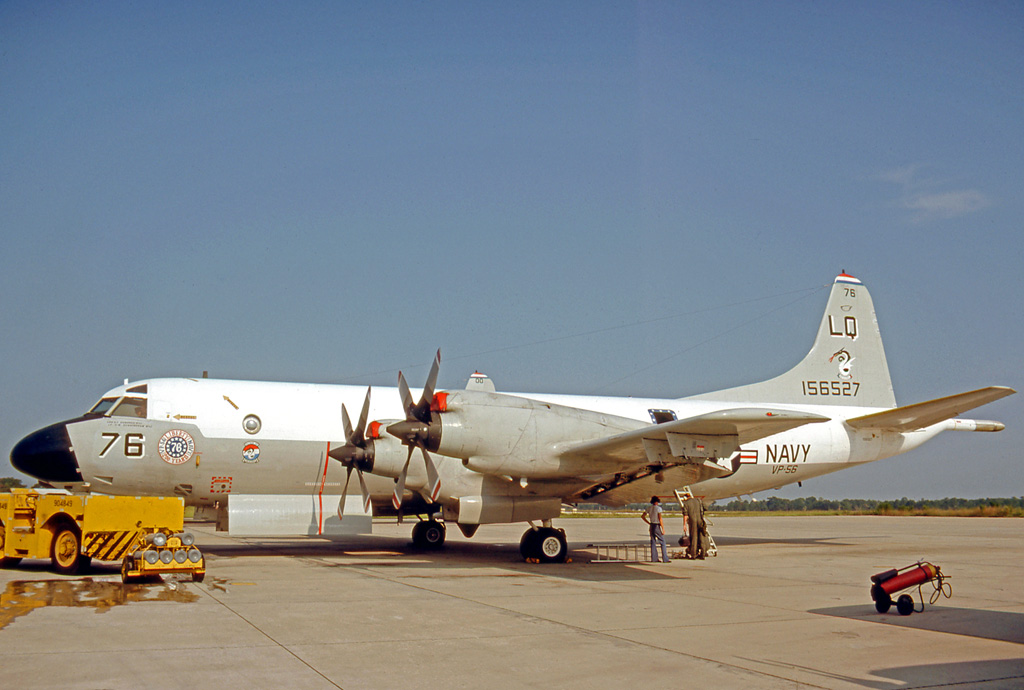
VP-56 P-3 at NAS Jacksonville in 1976

- 1 July 1946: VP-900 was established at NAS Anacostia, Washington D.C. It came under the operational control of FAW-5 and administrative control of the Naval Air Reserve Training Command. The squadron was one of 21 naval reserve squadrons established after the war to accommodate the large number of aircrews recently released from active duty and utilize the enormous stocks of aircraft on the inventory. The squadron flew the PBY-5A/6A Catalina amphibian and the PV-2 Harpoon landplane.
- 15 November 1946: All patrol squadrons were redesignated. Regular Navy squadron designations began with 1 and reserve patrol squadron designations began with 5. VP-900 was redesignated VP-ML-71. The ML for reserve patrol squadrons included twin-engine medium amphibian seaplanes, as well as twin-engine land-based bombers. Regular Navy patrol squadron ML designations were for twin-engine medium landbased bombers only. The amphibian medium seaplanes like the PBY-5A were in the AM category.
- February 1950: VP-ML-71 was redesignated VP-661 during the reorganization of the Naval Air Reserve units in 1949, but the redesignation did not take effect until February 1950. During this period the number of Naval Aviation reserve squadrons was reduced from the 1949 total of 24 to 9.
- 15 September 1950: VP-661 was called to active duty as a result of the Korean War. The squadron reported for duty to Commander Naval Air Force Atlantic Fleet at NAS Norfolk, Va. At the start of hostilities Navy patrol forces on active duty numbered just 20 squadrons, and it quickly became apparent that this meager figure was inadequate to meet the increased demands. By the end of 1950 seven reserve patrol squadrons were called to active duty to augment the regular Navy patrol squadrons. After reporting for duty at NAS Norfolk, Virginia, the squadron was sent to NAS Corpus Christi, Texas, for six weeks of transitional training in the PBM-5/5S2 Mariner seaplane.
- May 1953: The first of the squadron's new P5M-1 Marlin seaplanes began to arrive as replacements for the aging PBM Mariners. Pilots and ground crew personnel were sent to the Glenn L. Martin P5M school in Baltimore, Md., for training in operation and maintenance of the new aircraft.
- February 1958: VP-56 came to the assistance of sister squadron VP-45 when one of its aircraft became frozen in the ice at NAS Norfolk. A group of volunteers from VP-56 found and old WWII amphibious tractor and made their way to the aircraft over the ice. They were able to chop the aircraft out of the ice and tow it to the beach.
- 25 January–June 1961: VP-56 received its first P2V-7 Neptune and began transitioning from the Marlin seaplane. Transition training was completed by 8 June 1961.
- 1 October–November 1962: VP-56 deployed a detachment of five aircraft to NAS Guantanamo Bay, Cuba during the Cuban Missile Crisis. The squadron returned to NAS Norfolk in late November 1962, after earning a letter of commendation for their efforts.
- 15 May 1966: VP-56 deployed to Naval Air Station Sigonella, Sicily, relieving VP-23. Detachments operated at various times from RHAF Souda Bay, Crete; Capodichine, Italy; Athens, Greece; Wheelus Air Base, Libya; and Izmir Air Station, Turkey. While at Crete, the squadron was supported by USS Tallahatchie County.
- 27 May–5 June 1968: VP-56 were among the patrol squadrons and other naval units called upon to assist in the search for the ill-fated USS Scorpion which disappeared on 21 May 1968 50 miles south of the Azores. The search proved futile, and the four VP-56 patrol aircraft were released for return to NAS Norfolk on 5 June 1968.
- 7 June 1968: VP-56 received a permanent change of station from NAS Norfolk, to NAS Patuxent River, Maryland Upon arrival, the Dragons began preparing for transition from the SP-2H Neptune to the P-3B Orion.
- 8 August 1968: VP-56 received its first P-3B Orion. Eight P-3Bs would be received by the end of the transition, replacing 12 SP-2H Neptunes.
- September 1969: VP-56 received its first P-3C Orion and completed the transition training in October 1969. VP-56 were the first fleet patrol squadron to receive the P-3C. The baseline model incorporated the AN/ASQ-114 computer system for navigation and sensor functions, the first of its kind in a maritime patrol aircraft. It had an AN/AQA-7 Jezebel acoustic processing system and quadruple the number of directional sonobuoys, with a high capacity computer and related displays.
- February 1970: The squadron's first P-3C baseline Orion was retrofitted with DIFAR gear.
- 1 November 1970: VP-56 conducted its first deployment to Naval Air Station Keflavik, Iceland, as a P-3C squadron. The squadron was subsequently awarded a Navy Unit Commendation for its activities in surveillance of the Soviet submarine fleet during November and December 1970.
- 1 July 1971: VP-56 received a permanent change of station from NAS Patuxent River, Maryland to NAS Jacksonville, Florida
- 1 December 1971–February 1972: VP-56 deployed to NAS Keflavik, Iceland. On 25 February 1972, a disabled Soviet Hotel-class submarine was located on the surface. Squadron aircraft flew around-the-clock surveillance for five days until other Soviet ships could enter the area to assist the vessel.
- 6 May–July 1974: VP-56 deployed to NAF Sigonella. On 22 July, the United States Ambassador to Cyprus requested the assistance of the Sixth Fleet in evacuating American citizens from Cyprus due to the Turkish invasion of Cyprus. VP-56 flew 68 sorties in support of USS Forrestal while it covered the evacuation carried out by the Marines.
- April 1983: The squadron's P-3C baseline aircraft were retrofitted with the AQA-7V Acoustic DIFAR System.
- 1 January 1986: VP-56 deployed to NAF Sigonella. The squadron established a record for the number of hours spent on ship-to-aircraft tactical computerized communications, called data link, while tracking Soviet submarines in the Mediterranean.
- 24 March–15 April 1986: The squadron provided a detachment for support of the task force involved in operations against Libya. Operation Freedom of Navigation in the Gulf of Sidra was conducted in support of American carrier aircraft operating in international waters. In retaliation for missiles fired at U.S. Navy aircraft, airstrikes were conducted by the battle group against Libyan missile sites at Surt and three Libyan missile boats. On 14 to 15 April 1986, strikes were conducted against Benghazi and Tripoli by USS Coral Sea and USS America battle group aircraft and USAF F-111s staging out of bases in England.
- 7 August–October 1987: VP-56 deployed to NAS Bermuda and received a Meritorious Unit Commendation in connection with Hurricane Emily and the recovery efforts in its aftermath during the period 25 September to 23 October 1987.
- 28 June 1991: VP-56 was disestablished at NAS Jacksonville, Florida, with over 26 years and 178,000 hours of accident-free flying.

== Home port assignments ==
The squadron was assigned to these home ports, effective on the dates shown:

- NAS Anacostia, Maryland 1 July 1946
- NAS Norfolk, Virginia 15 September 1950
- NAS Patuxent River, Maryland 7 June 1968
- NAS Jacksonville, Florida July 1971

== Aircraft assignment ==
The squadron first received the following aircraft on the dates shown:

- PBY-5A/6A May 1946
- PV-2 May 1946
- PBM-5/5S2 September 1950
- P5M-1 May 1953
- P5M-2 1955
- P2V-7 January 1961
- SP-2H December 1962
- P-3B June 1968
- P-3C September 1969
- P-3C (MOD) 1986
- P-3C UIIIR July 1989

== See also ==
- Maritime patrol aircraft
- List of inactive United States Navy aircraft squadrons
- List of United States Navy aircraft squadrons
- List of squadrons in the Dictionary of American Naval Aviation Squadrons
- History of the United States Navy
