= VP-17 =

Patrol Squadron 17
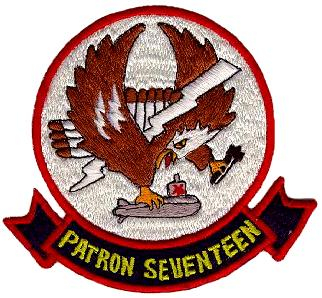
- VP-17 insignia
- Active: 1 July 1946–31 March 1995
- Country: United States
- Branch: Navy
- Type: Squadron
- Role: Antisubmarine Patrol
- Part of: United States Navy/Naval Air Forces/Patrol Wing
- Nickname(s): White Lightnings
- Engagements: Korean War; Vietnam War

Aircraft flown
- Patrol: PBY Catalina; PV-2 Harpoon; P4Y-2/2S Privateer; P2V Neptune; P-3 Orion

VP-17, nicknamed the White Lightnings, was a Patrol Squadron of the U.S. Navy.

The squadron was established as Reserve Patrol Squadron VP-916 on 1 July 1946. It was redesignated as Medium Patrol Squadron VP-ML-66 on 15 November 1946, as VP-722 in February 1950, and as VP-17 on 4 February 1953. It was redesignated Heavy Attack Mining Squadron VA-(HM)-10 on 1 July 1956, and finally, for the second time, redesignated VP-17 on 1 July 1959. The squadron was disestablished on 31 March 1995, after 49 years of service. It was the third squadron to be designated VP-17, the first VP-17 was redesignated as VP-42 on 1 July 1939 and the second VP-17 was redesignated VPB-17 on 1 October 1944.

== Operational history ==
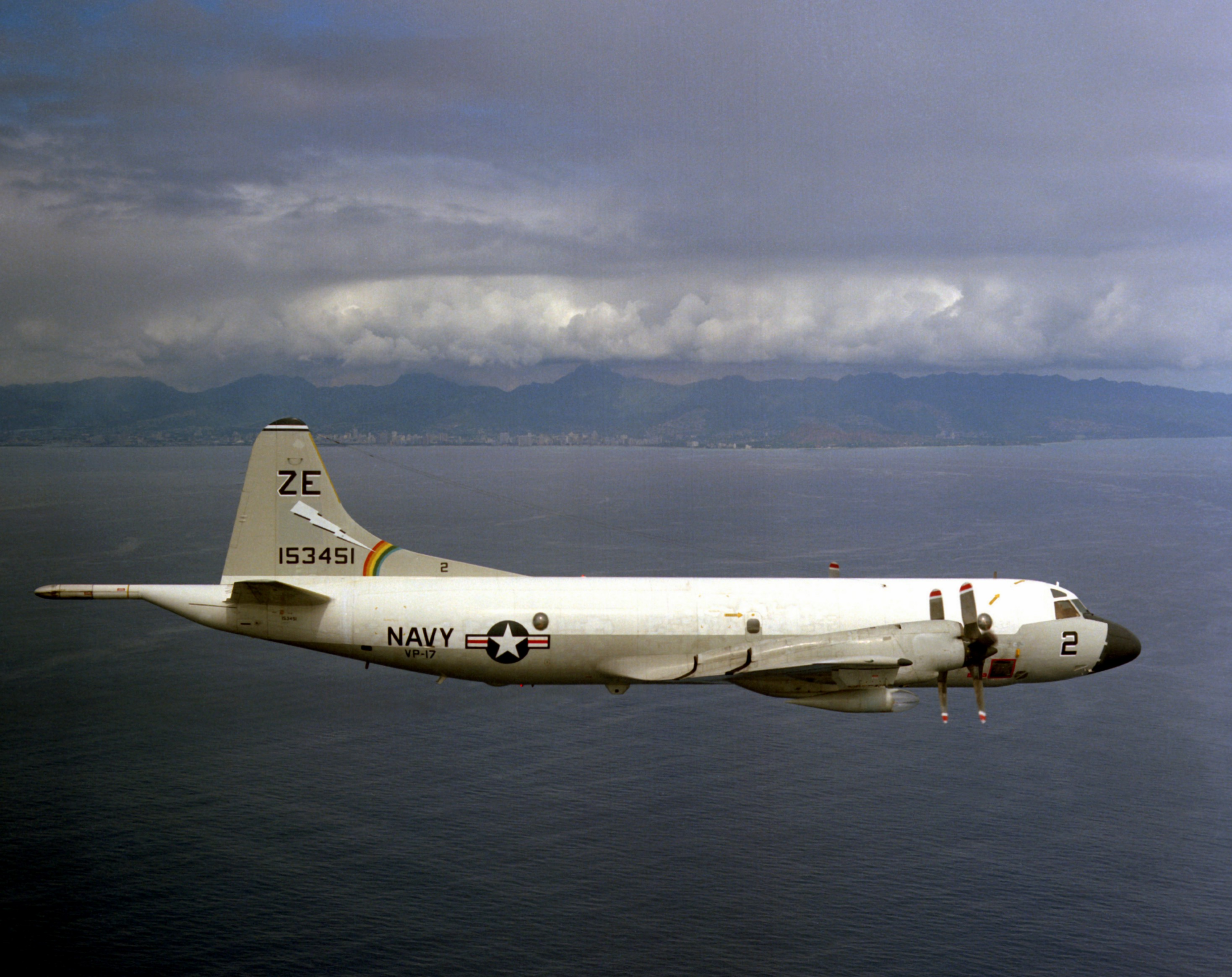
VP-17 P-3B off Oahu in 1976

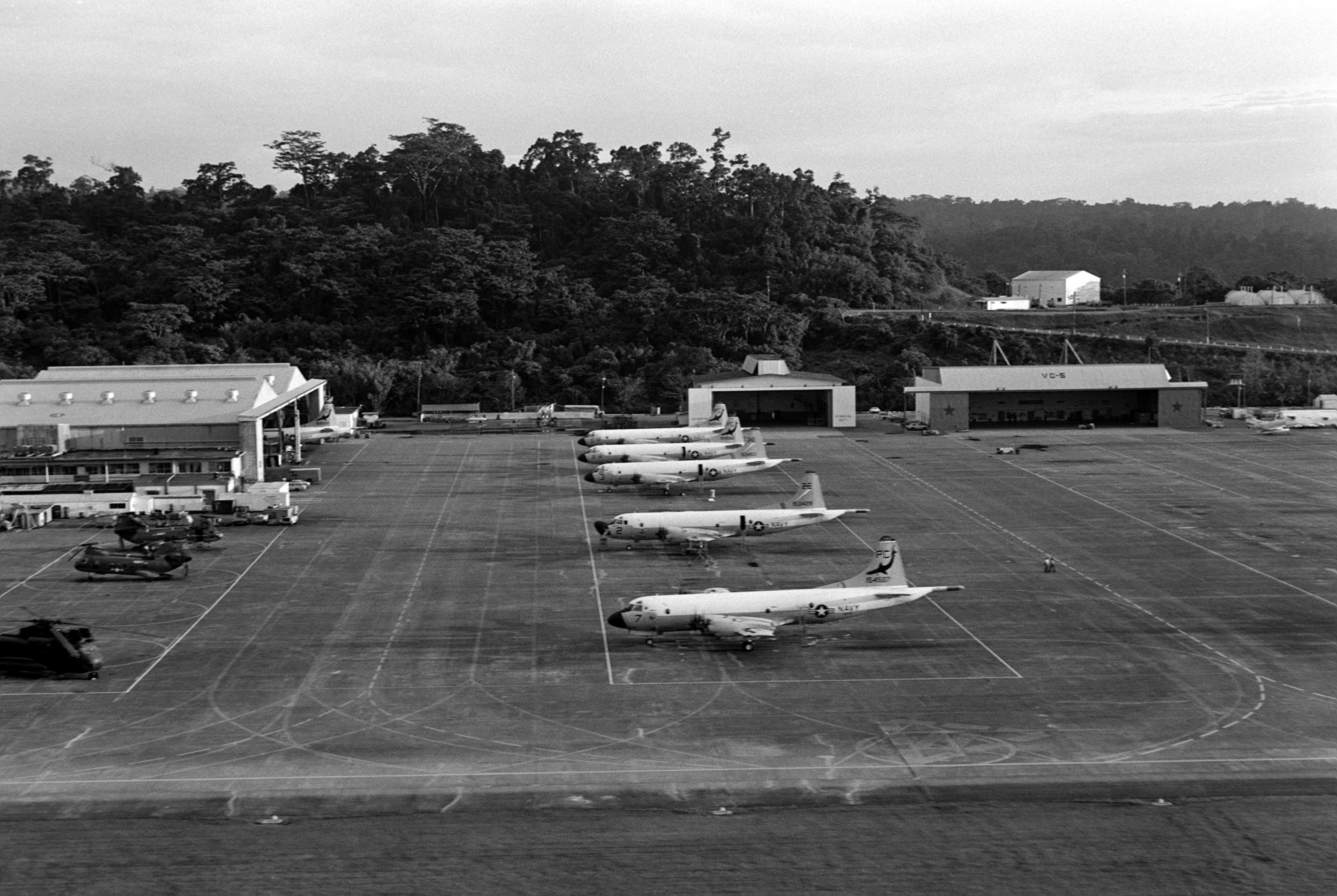
VP-17 P-3Bs at NAS Cubi Point in 1986

- May 1946: VP-916 was established at NAS Los Alamitos, California. The squadron came under the operational control of FAW-4 and administrative control by Naval Air Reserve Training (NARTU). It was another of the 21 naval reserve squadrons established after the war to accommodate the large number of aircrews recently released from active duty and utilize the enormous stocks of aircraft on the inventory. The squadron flew the PV-2 Harpoon and the amphibious PBY-5A Catalina.
- 15 November 1946: All patrol squadrons were redesignated. Regular Navy patrol squadron designation numbers began with 1 and reserve squadron numbers began with 5. VP-916 was redesignated VP-ML-66. The ML designation, medium patrol squadrons, included twin-engine medium amphibious seaplanes, as well as twin-engine land-based bombers. Regular Navy patrol squadrons with the ML designation were for twin-engine medium land-based bombers only. The amphibious medium seaplanes like the PBY-5A used the AM, amphibian designation for regular Navy squadrons.
- February 1950: VP-ML-66 was redesignated VP-772 during the reorganization of Naval Aviation reserve units in 1949, but the change did not take effect until February 1950. During this period the number of Naval Aviation reserve squadrons was reduced from the 1949 total of 24 to 9.
- 1 September 1950: VP-772 was called to active duty for service during the Korean War. The squadron relocated from its home base at NAS Los Alamitos, to NAS Whidbey Island, Washington. Aircrews were given transition training for conversion to the P4Y-2/2S Privateer. The 2S version of this aircraft featured surface search radar. A brief lull occurred in the intensive training cycle when the squadron paid a visit to Saigon. The squadron left several Privateers for use by the French forces in the Indochina war.
- 1–31 January 1951: VP-772 deployed to Marine Corps Air Station Iwakuni, Japan, where VP-772 became the first activated naval reserve squadron to participate in the Korean War. On 31 January 1951, the squadron began combat operations from NAS Atsugi, Japan, flying missions over Korea, the Sea of Japan, the Yellow Sea and the Tsushima Strait.
- June–August 1951: From 12 June through the end of August several of the squadron's aircraft were detached in two-aircraft elements for operations with the night attack aircraft of the 1st Marine Air Wing at K-1 Air Base, Pusan, South Korea. The detachment provided direct support for ground operations by dropping MK-6 flares at night to provide illumination for USMC ground attack aircraft. Although initially an experiment, the operations proved so successful they were continued by other similarly equipped patrol squadrons.
- 1 January–February 1953: VP-772 deployed to NAS Barbers Point, Hawaii, in preparation for duty in the Korean combat zone. On 1 February 1953, the squadron began combat operations from Iwakuni, Japan, flying missions over the Sea of Japan, Tsushima Strait and the Yellow Sea. The squadron was the last to fly the P4Y-2/2S in combat. No losses in personnel or equipment were incurred in 435 combat missions.
- 4 February 1953: VP-772 was augmented into the regular Navy and redesignated as the third VP-17. Toward the end of the Korean War the decision was made to augment all of the nine reserve patrol squadrons activated during the 1950 to 1951 time period as part of the regular Navy. The redesignations did not require changes in tail codes or home bases.
- 1 August 1953: The squadron returned from its Korean deployment to a new home base at NAS Whidbey Island. Immediately upon return, the squadron began conversion to the P2V-6 Neptune. VP-17 was the last West Coast patrol squadron to fly the P4Y-2.
- April 1956: VP-17 deployed to Naha Air Base, Okinawa. During this deployment the squadron was redesignated VP(HM)-10 on 1 July 1956, one of only two such squadrons in the Navy. VP(HM)-10 was the only Heavy Attack Mining squadron on the West Coast. Shortly after its return from Okinawa, the aircrews began transition training to the P2V-6M, which was configured for firing the AUM-N-2 Petrel air-to-surface turbojet missile.
- April 1957: The squadron's P2V-6M aircraft were transferred to the reserves and replaced with P2V-5Fs. Transition training commenced immediately in preparation for the pending WestPac deployment. Squadron deployed to Iwakuni, Japan. returned to Whidbey late March 1958.
- 19 August 1960: The squadron deployed to NAS Kodiak, assisting the Navy Hydrographic Office in compiling information on the Arctic Ocean and conducting ASW training in an adverse weather operational environment.
- 20 October 1961: VP-17 deployed to NAS Kodiak, Alaska, with a detachment at Naval Air Facility Adak. During this period the squadron participated in tests of the SSM-N-8 Regulus missile with USS Grayback.
- 9 January–May 1963: VP-17 returned to NAS Kodiak, Alaska, for joint exercises with Sea Frontier forces and the Canadian Maritime Air Command. On 10 January 1963, the squadron incurred it first aircraft accident in over eight years. A squadron SP-2H crashed into a mountainside while attempting a wave-off at Kodiak. Five of the crew survived, but seven were killed. In May 1963, the squadron was called upon to assist in breaking up an ice jam in the Yukon and Kuskokwim Rivers which was causing a great deal of flooding. Several planes were sent to bomb the jam with 500-pound bombs.
- 27 April–August 1964: VP-17 relieved VP-6 at NAF Naha, Okinawa. In August the squadron provided ASW coverage for the task groups moving into the South China Sea after the Gulf of Tonkin incident.
- December 1964: The squadron began rotations of threeaircraft detachments to Kodiak, Alaska. In that same month, Detachment 2 assisted the Army Corps of Engineers in breaking up ice jams on the Klutina and Copper rivers during subzero weather conditions.
- March 1965: VP-17 received a new look. A white lightning bolt on a blue background was painted on top of the vertical fin and propeller spinner domes on all squadron aircraft.
- 9 July 1965: The squadron deployed to MCAS Iwakuni, Japan, maintaining a detachment at Tan Son Nhut Air Base. The deployment marked the first deployment of the squadron to a combat zone since the Korean War.
- 15 September–December 1966: VP-17 deployed to MCAS Iwakuni, Japan, for two and one-half months’ of duty in support of Operation Market Time, interdicting shipping off South Vietnam coastal waters. On 5 December 1966, the squadron relocated from Iwakuni to Naval Station Sangley Point, Philippines, with a detachment at Tan Son Nhut AB, South Vietnam, for support of Market Time missions with the Seventh Fleet. VP-17 was relieved at NS Sangley Point, by VP-42.
- 9 November 1967–March 1968: VP-17 deployed to NS Sangley Point, with a detachment at Cam Ranh Bay Air Base, South Vietnam. Following the seizure of the intelligence ship USS Pueblo by the North Koreans, VP-17 participated in a mission from 14 January to 11 February 1968 to provide an ASW patrol net for elements of the Seventh Fleet in the Sea of Japan as part of Operation Formation Star. On 4 March 1968, a Vietcong unit mortared the detachment at Cam Ranh Bay AB. One squadron aircraft was heavily damaged, but no VP-17 personnel were injured. The squadron was relieved at the end of its tour by VP-50.
- 19 July 1969: VP-17 deployed to MCAS Iwakuni, Japan, relieving VP-1. During the deployment squadron detachments flew from bases at NAS Atsugi, Japan; Misawa Air Base, Japan; Naval Air Station Agana, Guam; NS Sangley Point; NAF Cam Ranh Bay, RVN; and U-Tapao Royal Thai Navy Airfield, Thailand. The squadron was relieved by VP-1.
- 3 August 1970: A squadron P-3A, ZE-06, BuNo. 152159, exploded in flight after takeoff from Nellis Air Force Base, Calif. The plane crashed near Searchlight, Nevada, killing all 10 crew members aboard. The cause of the accident was never determined.
- 24 October 1970: VP-17 deployed to NS Sangley Point, under the operational control of FAW-10 and TU 72.3.2. Detachments were maintained at U-Tapao, Thailand and Taipei, Taiwan. Ninety-three Market Time patrols were flown along the coast of South Vietnam. The squadron was relieved by VP-48.
- 13 January–April 1972: The squadron deployed to NAF Naha, Okinawa, with a detachment maintained at Naval Air Station Cubi Point, Philippines, from 9 April through 23 April. Numerous Market Time patrols were flown during the deployment.
- April to October 1972. President Nixon extended the VietNam War in late April 1972. VP-17 remained positioned at NAF Naha, Okinawa while receiving incoming replacement personnel to the Squadron. During the next 5 1/2 months, VP-17 would continue to provide small detachments of 3 aircraft each time in support of Market Time patrols off the Coast of VietNam till the deployment ended.
- 19 April–2 October 1973: The squadron deployed to NAS Cubi Point. On 2 October 1973, VP-17 flew the final Market Time combat support patrol, which marked the end of over 10 years of daily surveillance flights by patrol squadrons in the South China Sea during the Vietnam War.
- 10 December 1974: VP-17 became the last patrol squadron to deploy to Naha Air Base, Okinawa.
- 29 April 1975: VP-17 provided operational support in Operation Frequent Wind, the evacuation of Americans from Saigon, South Vietnam.
- May 1975: The squadron became the first patrol squadron to operate from the newly constructed facilities at Kadena Air Base, Koza, Okinawa. Their relocation to the new base took less than two weeks without disruption to the squadron's operational mission. During the deployment the squadron conducted operations throughout the western Pacific, the South China Sea and the Indian Ocean. These operations included surveillance patrols for Vietnam refugees and support during the Mayaguez Incident. One VP-17 aircraft suffered slight damage from enemy fire during the operation.
- 12 July 1976: A VP-17 P-3 aircraft visited Nairobi demonstrated U.S. friendly ties and support for Kenya during her crisis with Uganda. USS Ranger and her escort ships of Task Force 77.7 operated off the coast of Kenya to deter military operations by Uganda against Kenya.
- March 1977: Three aircraft and four aircrews deployed to Naval Air Facility Midway Island to participate in Pony Express operations in conjunction with the U.S. Air Force, an intelligence gathering operation on Soviet missile launches.
- May 1990: During deployment to Adak, Alaska, the White Lightnings sent a detachment on a SAR mission to locate a stranded Norwegian expedition at the North Pole. After locating the group, food and medical supplies were dropped.
- August 1990: VP-17 deployed detachments to Panama to take part in drug interdiction operations called Operations 90-43 and 90–46.
- 10 May 1991: VP-17 deployed to NAF Diego Garcia, with a detachment at NAF Kadena, Okinawa, and Masirah Island, Oman, to support UN maritime sanctions against Iraq following Operation Desert Storm.
- June–November 1993: The squadron began to transition from the P-3C UI Orion to the P-3C UIII. During the squadron's September to November drug interdiction deployment to Panama, the squadron's acoustic operators were given ample opportunity to test their new equipment on the P-3CUIII.
- 31 March 1995: VP-17 was disestablished.

== Home port assignments ==
The squadron was assigned to these home ports, effective on the dates shown:

- NAS Los Alamitos, California – May 1946
- NAS Whidbey Island, Washington – 1 September 1950
- NAS Seattle, Washington – 3 August 1951
- NAS Whidbey Island, Washington – 1 August 1953
- NAS Barbers Point, Hawaii – 1 December 1968

== Aircraft assignment ==
The squadron first received the following aircraft on the dates shown:

- PBY-5A Catalina – May 1946
- P4Y-2/2S Privateer – 1949
- P2V-6 Neptune – August 1953
- P2V-6M Neptune – September 1956
- P2V-5F Neptune – April 1957
- P2V-7S (SP-2H) Neptune – December 1959
- P2V-7 Neptune – December 1960
- P-3A Orion – December 1968
- P-3A DIFAR Orion – September 1972
- P-3B TAC/NAV MOD Orion – June 1978
- P-3C (MOD) Orion – January 1986
- P-3C UI Orion – November 1990
- P-3C UIIR Orion – June 1993

== See also ==
- Maritime patrol aircraft
- List of Lockheed P-3 Orion variants
- List of inactive United States Navy aircraft squadrons
- List of United States Navy aircraft squadrons
- List of squadrons in the Dictionary of American Naval Aviation Squadrons
- History of the United States Navy
