= VP-49 =

Patrol Squadron 49
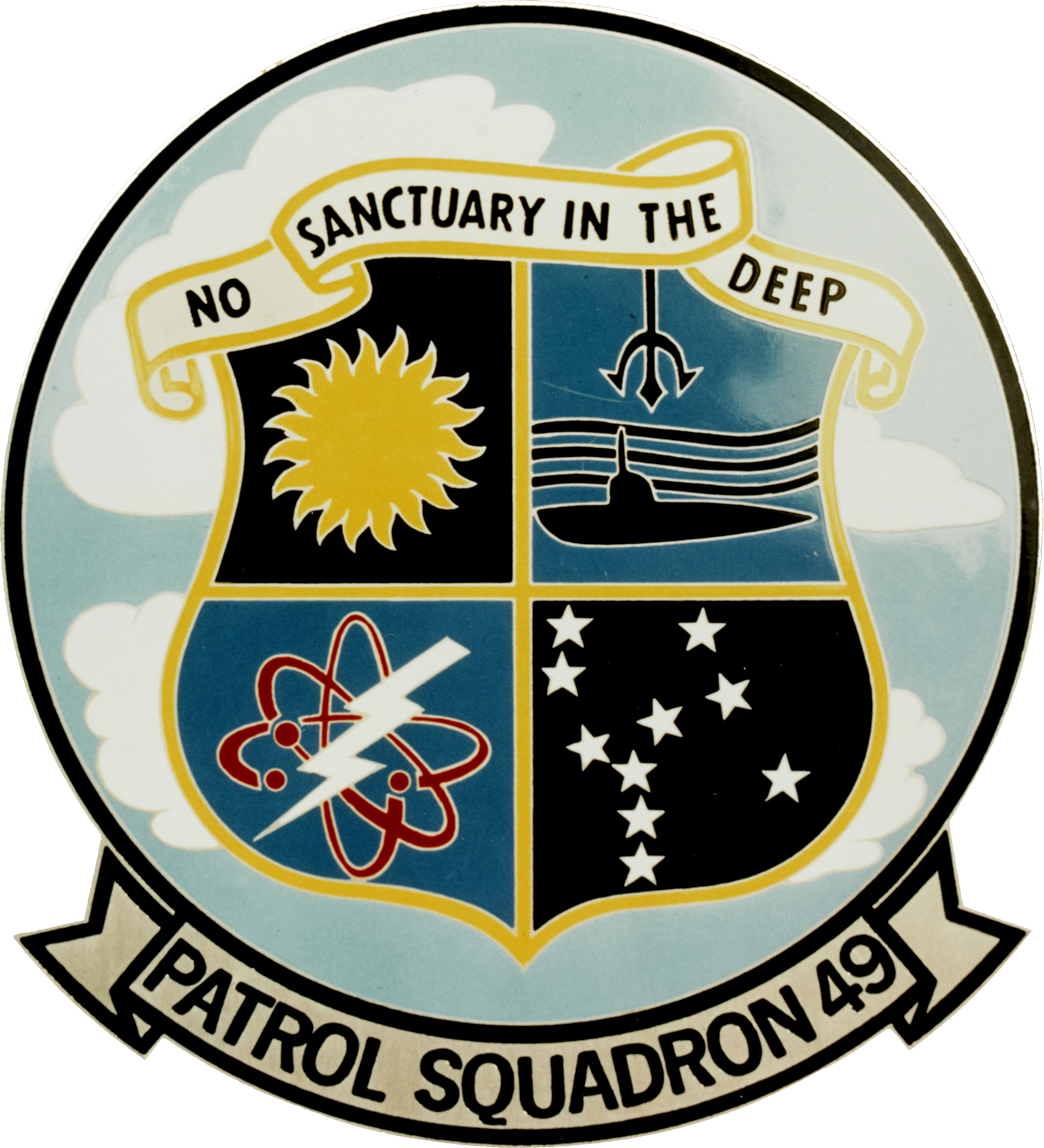
- VP-49 insignia
- Active: May 1946-23 May 1991
- Country: United States of America
- Branch: United States Navy
- Type: squadron
- Role: Maritime patrol
- Nickname: Woodpeckers
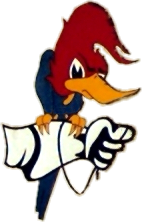
- Mascot
- Engagements: World War II; Korean War; Vietnam War

Aircraft flown
- Patrol: PBM-3D Mariner; P5M Marlin; P-3 Orion

VP-49 was a long-lived Patrol Squadron of the U.S. Navy, having held that designation for 45 years from 1948 to 1994. Its nickname was the Woodpeckers from 1973 to 1994. It was established as VP-19 on 1 February 1944, redesignated Patrol Bombing Squadron VPB-19 on 1 October 1944, redesignated VP-19 on 15 May 1946, redesignated Medium Patrol Squadron (Seaplane) VP-MS-9 on 15 November 1946, redesignated VP-49 on 1 September 1948 and disestablished 1 March 1994.

== Operational history ==
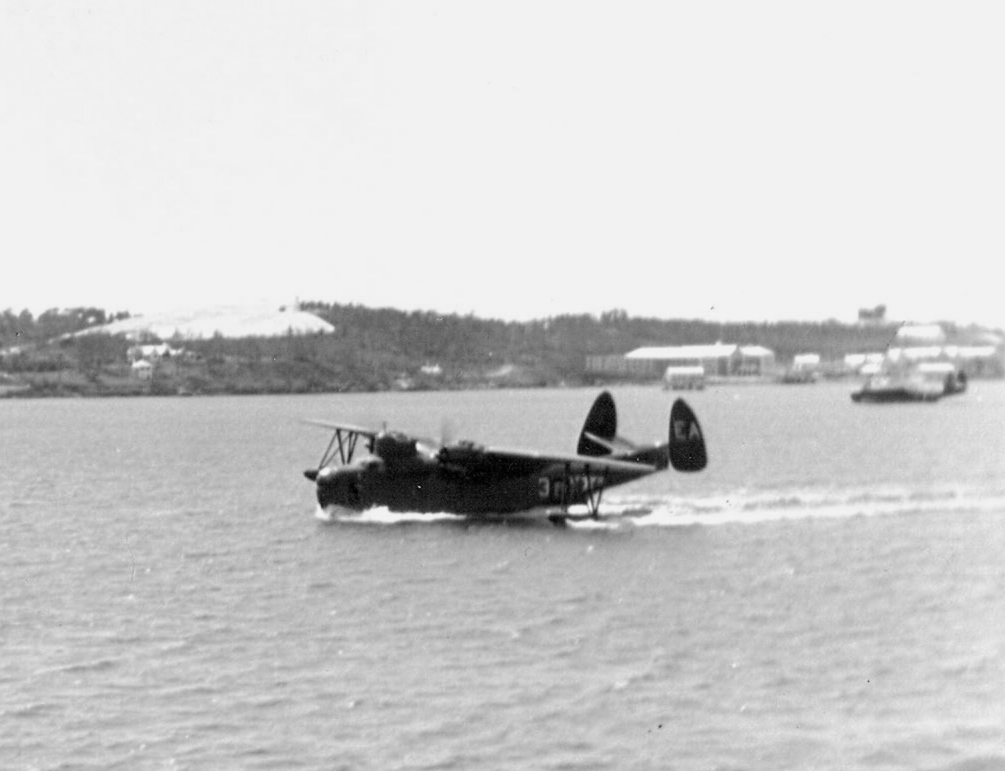
VP-49 PBM-5 at Bermuda, 1949.

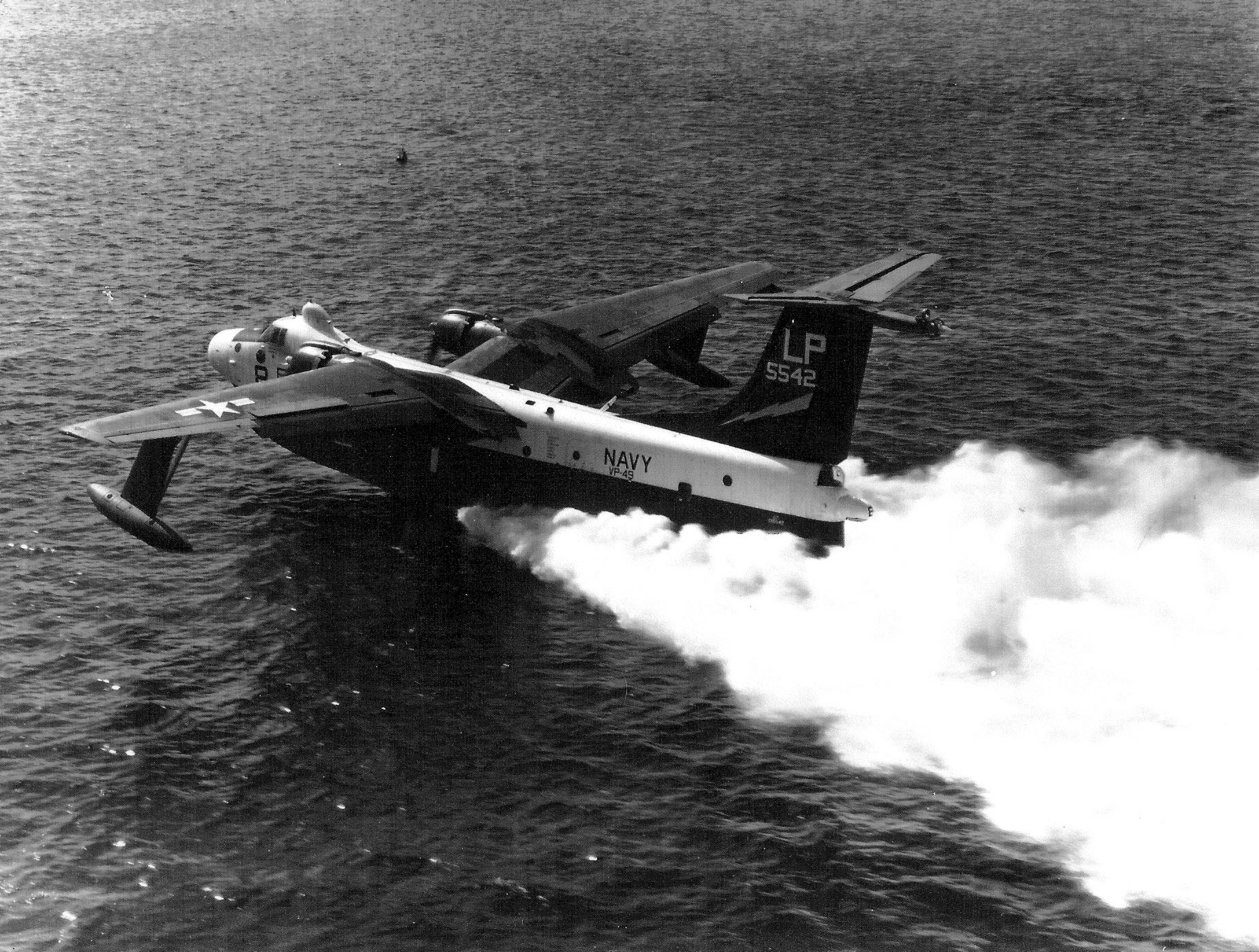
VP-49 SP-5B takes off from Guantanamo Bay in 1963.

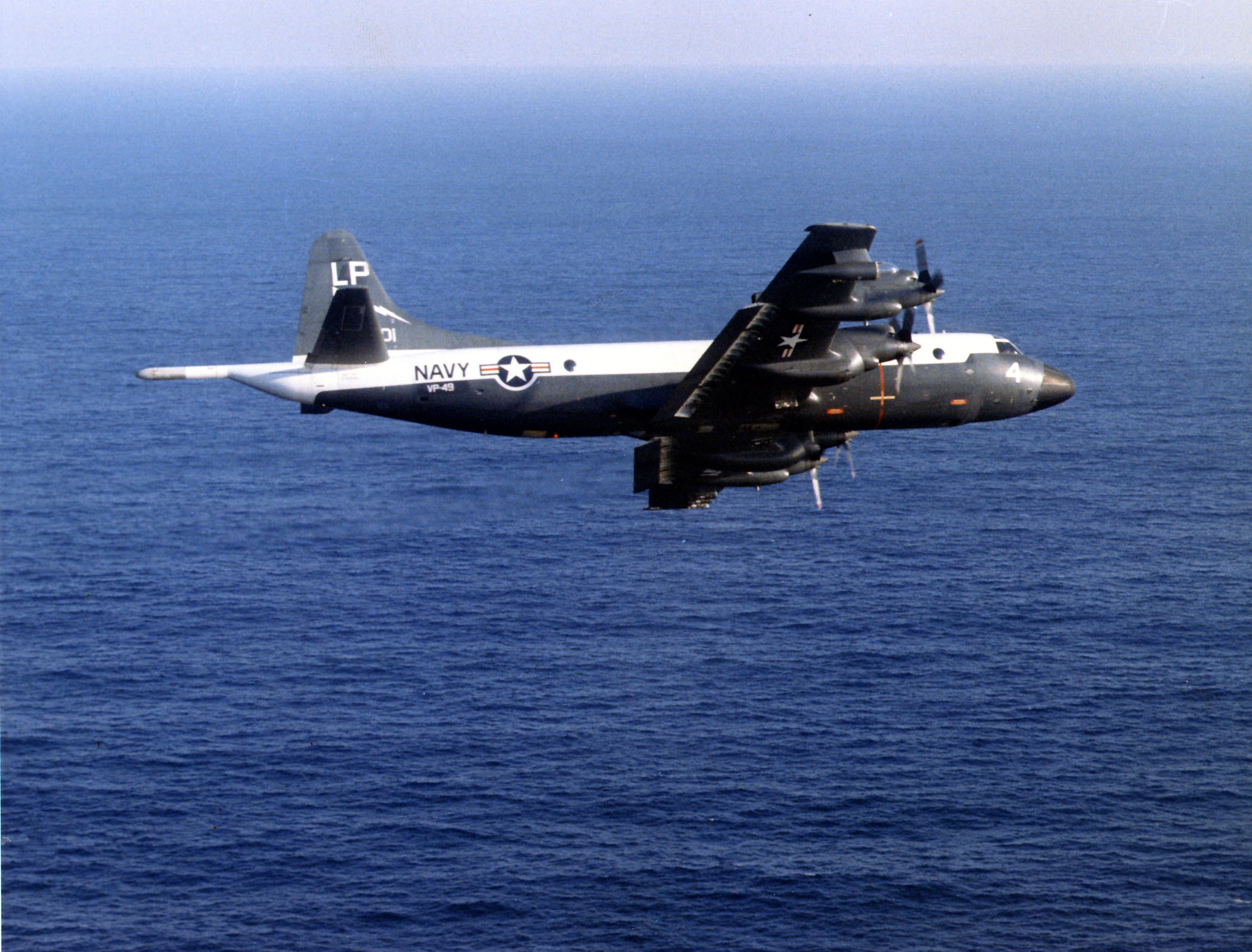
VP-49 P-3A in 1964.

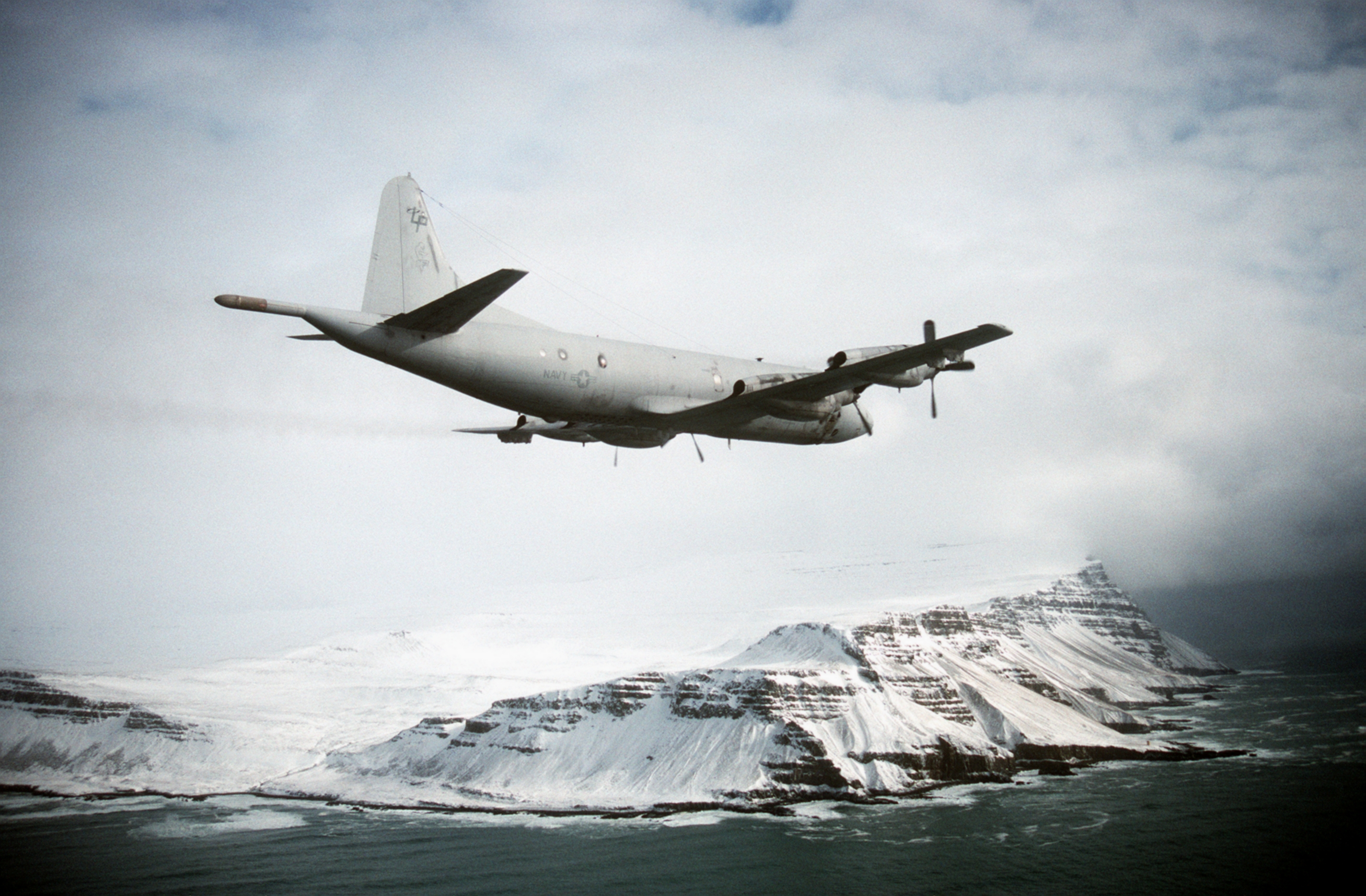
VP-49 P-3C near Iceland in 1993.

- 1 February 1944: VP-19 was established at NAS Alameda, California, as a seaplane squadron flying the PBM-3D Mariner. Personnel were given ground and operational patrol training through July under the operational control of FAW-8.
- 10 July 1944: The squadron began its transpac to NAS Kaneohe Bay, Hawaii, from NAS Alameda, Calif. The last aircraft arrived on 18 July 1944. While at Kaneohe the squadron came under the operational control of FAW-2. Operational training in the use of JATO commenced immediately after the squadron was settled into its new quarters.
- 2–23 November 1944: VPB-19 flew to Parry Island, Eniwetok, based on board the tender USS St. George. On 23 November 1944, the squadron moved ashore at Parry Island. Activities consisted of daily sector searches, hunter-killer patrols, air-sea rescue and reconnaissance flights over Wake and Ponape islands. The squadron came under the operational control of Commander Shore-Based Air Force, Marshalls-Gilberts Area.
- 12 February 1945: VPB-19 was transferred to Iwo Jima via Saipan, with tender support provided by USS Hamlin. Missions were flown to within 100 miles of the Japanese mainland.
- 6–17 March 1945: VPB-19 was transferred back to Parry Island, Eniwetok, based ashore with a detachments aboard various tenders. The squadron returned to combat operations consisting of sector searches, hunter-killer patrols and Dumbo missions in the vicinity of Ponape and Wake Islands.
- May 1945: Squadron planes were equipped with expendable radio sonobuoys and the crews were trained in their use.
- July 1951: The squadron was transferred to a new home base at NAS Bermuda under operational control of FAW-5. Intra-service training missions were conducted in cooperation with the USAF squadrons stationed at Bermuda.
- 1955: VP-49 provided support for the evaluation trials of the first nuclear submarine USS Nautilus.
- July–September 1957: VP-49 participated in evaluations using an LSD-type tender to support the operation the squadron's P5M aircraft.
- October 1962: VP-49 participated in the quarantine of Cuba during the Cuban Missile Crisis. The squadron joined several other regular and reserve patrol squadrons in surveillance flights over the approaches to Cuba during the period of quarantine from 15 October to 26 November 1962.
- June 1963: A deployment to Guantanamo Bay Naval Base marked the last time the squadron operated as a seaplane squadron. From June to August 1963 the squadron turned in its SP-5B Marlin seaplanes in preparation for transition to a landplane squadron.
- August 1963 – February 1964: The squadron was transferred to NAS Patuxent River, Md. On 1 September 1963, NAS Patuxent River officially became the new home base for VP-49. However, the main body of the squadron remained at NAS Bermuda and only a detachment was maintained at NAS Patuxent River. The squadron detachment began transitioning from the SP-5B Marlin seaplane to the P-3A Orion. The main body of the squadron moved to NAS Patuxent River in February 1964.
- 1964: VP-49 joined VPs 8 and 44 in alternating convoy coverage from the East Coast of the U.S. to the coast of Spain in Operation Steel Pike I. It marked the first time that land-based escorts provided complete ASW coverage for a convoy transiting the Atlantic.
- 15–22 July 1966: A detachment of VP-49 aircraft deployed to Kindley Air Force Base, Bermuda, to provide air support for the Gemini 10 mission.
- 6–15 September 1966: Aircraft from VP-49 deployed to Kindley AFB, Bermuda, to provide air support for the Gemini 11 mission on 12 September.
- 27 May 1968: VP-49 began a split deployment with half of the squadron based at Naval Station Sangley Point, Philippines, and the other half at U-Tapao Royal Thai Navy Airfield, Thailand. The Philippine detachment was at Sangley Point when a magnitude 7.0 earthquake struck the area. Personnel of the squadron volunteered hundreds of hours in support of the international relief efforts. The U-Tapao detachment flew missions for the Seventh Fleet in Operation Market Time surveillance operations in Vietnamese waters.
- 17 July 1970: VP-49 deployed to Naval Air Station Keflavik, Iceland, taking the P-3C on its first deployment. This model of the Orion featured the latest ASW warfare equipment including the AN/ASQ-114 computer system for navigation and sensor functions, the first of its kind in a maritime patrol aircraft. The P-3C had an AN/AQA-7 acoustic processing system with DIFAR, quadruple the number of directional sonobuoys, and a high capacity computer with related displays.
- 1 July 1971: VP-49 deployed to NAS Keflavik, for a five-month tour. The squadron earned a Navy Unit Commendation for operations in the North Atlantic during 14 to 25 September 1971.
- 1 October 1972: The squadron deployed to NAS Keflavik. In March, two aircraft were detached to Valkenburg Naval Air Base, Katwijk, Netherlands, to provide Dutch aircrews a firsthand look at the ASW capabilities of the Orion aircraft.
- 8 March 1975: The squadron deployed to Naval Air Station Sigonella, Sicily, earning a Meritorious Unit Commendation during operations in the Mediterranean.
- 11–30 January 1976: VP-49 deployed a detachment to RAF Ascension Island. Surveillance flights over high-interest Soviet units off the west coast of Africa earned the squadron a Meritorious Unit Commendation.
- 27 July 1976: VP-49 deployed to NAS Keflavik, earning a Meritorious Unit Commendation for ASW surveillance operations against Soviet units in October.
- 2 November 1982: VP-49 deployed to NAS Sigonella, under the operational command of CTF 67. Detachments were sent during the deployment to Souda Bay, Crete, and Naval Station Rota, Spain. While on this deployment, the squadron earned the Navy Expeditionary Medal for missions off the coast of Lebanon during the 1982 Lebanon War.
- July 1985: VP-49 deployed to NAS Sigonella. During the deployment, the squadron participated in the interception of the Achille Lauro hijackers.
- July–October 1986: The squadron traveled to South America to participate in Unitas XXVIII and Swampfox 86 exercises, operating with the navies and air forces of Peru, Chile, Uruguay and Brazil.
- Patrol Squadron 49 (VP-49) deployed to Bermuda from February 1987 to August 1987.
- Patrol Squadron 49 (VP-49) deployed to Sigonella Sicily from August 1988 to February 1989.
- 1 February 1990: VP-49 deployed to NAS Bermuda, with a detachment assigned to Roosevelt Roads Naval Station, Puerto Rico. The detachment in the Caribbean participated in Department of Defense surveillance missions with the U.S. Coast Guard to curtail drug running. The "Woodpecker Vice" crews made five successful intercepts totaling over $20 million in hashish and cocaine, one intercept alone included over $12 million in drugs aboard. The latter was the largest seizure to date. Both detachments deployed to NAS Keflavik in late April 1990.
- 1 May 1990: VP-49 deployed to NAS Keflavik, marking the first time a P-3C squadron equipped with the Update III package had conducted operations against the Soviet Northern Fleet. The aircraft had an entirely new underwater acoustic monitoring system, doubling the number of sonobuoys that could be monitored concurrently over earlier marks. IBM signal processors provided a four-fold gain in isolating sounds of submerged targets from ocean background noise. Improvements in avionics, computers (AN/AYA-8) and cooling systems were added, along with a retractable forward-looking infrared turret under the chin of the aircraft and Harpoon air-to-surface missile capability.
- 10 March 1993: VP-49 deployed to Keflavik under CTG 84.1. Duties included ASW NATO operations, joint training with the USS John F. Kennedy battle group, navigation training to the North Pole, and ice reconnaissance missions to Thule, Greenland. With the end of the Cold War, the squadron conducted historic visits to Poland and the former Soviet Republics of Estonia, Latvia and Lithuania.
- 25 September 1993: Upon return from Iceland, the squadron immediately commenced Haitian Assistance Group Operations. These patrol flights flown by the squadron were part of the efforts at enforcing the United Nations' blockade against the Haitian military coup.
- 1 March 1994: VP-49 was disestablished at NAS Jacksonville, Florida, after concluding more than 32 years and 214,000 hours of accident-free flying, a record in the patrol aviation community.

== Home port assignments ==
The squadron was assigned to these home ports, effective on the dates shown:

- NAS Alameda, California 1 February 1944
- NAS Kaneohe Bay, Hawaii 10 July 1944
- NAAF Eniwetok 2 November 1944*
- NAS Alameda, California January–February 1946
- NAS Norfolk, Virginia 9 April 1946
- NAS Pensacola, Florida 1 June 1949
- NAS Norfolk, 25 August 1949
- NAS Bermuda 5 July 1951
- NAS Patuxent River, Maryland 1 September 1963**
- NAS Jacksonville, Florida 31 January 1972

* The squadron was moved to Iwo Jima during February to March 1945 and then returned to NAAF Eniwetok.
** The squadron's home port was officially changed on 1 September 1963 to NAS Patuxent River. However, only a squadron detachment was maintained at NAS Patuxent River between September 1963 to January 1964. The main body of the squadron stayed at NAS Bermuda and did not move to NAS Patuxent River until February 1964.

== Aircraft assignment ==
The squadron first received the following aircraft on the dates shown:

- PBM-3D February 1944
- P5M-1 December 1952
- P5M-2 June 1960
- SP-5B December 1962
- P-3A August 1963
- P-3C September 1969
- P-3C UIIIR 1989

== See also ==
- Maritime patrol aircraft
- List of inactive United States Navy aircraft squadrons
- List of United States Navy aircraft squadrons
- List of squadrons in the Dictionary of American Naval Aviation Squadrons
- History of the United States Navy
