= VP-42 =

Patrol Squadron 42
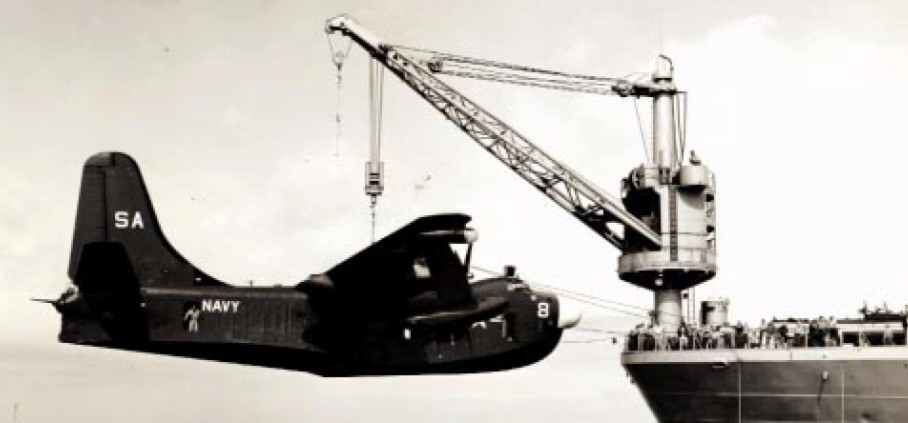
- VP-22 P5M is lifted aboard USS Salisbury Sound in 1955
- Active: 7 April 1944 – 26 September 1969
- Country: United States of America
- Branch: United States Navy
- Type: squadron
- Role: Maritime patrol
- Nickname: Sea Demons
- Engagements: World War II; Korean War; Vietnam War

Aircraft flown
- Patrol: PBM-3D; P5M; SP-2E/H

VP-42 was a Patrol Squadron of the U.S. Navy. The squadron was established as Patrol Squadron 22 (VP-22) on 7 April 1944, redesignated Patrol Bombing Squadron 22 (VPB-22) on 1 October 1944, redesignated Patrol Squadron 22 (VP-22) on 15 May 1946, redesignated Medium Patrol Squadron (Seaplane) 2 (VP-MS-2) on 15 November 1946, redesignated Patrol Squadron 42 (VP-42) on 1 September 1948 and disestablished on 26 September 1969.

== Operational history ==
From the public domain Dictionary of American Naval Aviation Squadrons:

- 7 April – 10 June 1944: VP-22 was established at NAAS Harvey Point, North Carolina, under the operational control of FAW-5, as a seaplane patrol squadron equipped with the PBM-3D Mariner. Ground and flight training continued at Harvey Point until 1 June 1944, when the squadron was relocated to NAS Key West, Florida, for training in Anti-submarine warfare (ASW). The course was completed on 10 June 1944, and the squadron returned to NAAS Harvey Point.
- 12–18 July 1944: The squadron received orders to NAS Alameda, California, in preparation for a trans-Pacific flight to the South Pacific. The midpoint landing area during the cross-country flight for most of the squadron was at Eagle Mountain Lake, Texas, where a temporary refueling and minor maintenance depot had been positioned. The last aircraft arrived at NAS Alameda on the 18th, and all hands engaged in aircraft maintenance and stowage of equipment/spares in the aircraft for use in the war zone. During the period of preparation for the trans-Pacific, the squadron came under the control of FAW-8.
- 25 August – October 1944: VP-22 ground personnel had departed on board ship in advance of the squadron flight crews. On the 25th the aircrews departed in elements of three for NAS Kaneohe Bay, Hawaii, with the last aircraft arriving a few days later. Upon arrival of the last aircrew, operational patrols in Hawaiian waters and combat training began, and continued through October 1944 under the operational control of FAW-2.
- 10 October 1944: VPB-22 was transferred to Parry Island seaplane base, Eniwetok, under the operational control of FAW-2. From this location the squadron conducted strikes against Japanese targets on Ponape and Wake Island. Dumbo (air-sea rescue) missions were carried out on an as-needed basis in the vicinity of the combat zone.
- 30 November 1944: The squadron was relocated to Kossol Passage, Palau, under the operational control of FAW-1. Daily sector searches and Dumbo missions were assigned.
- 22 January 1945: VPB-22 was relocated from Palau to Ulithi Atoll, in the Carolines island group. Tender support was provided by USS Cumberland Sound. The squadron was assigned duties of long-range flights and night ASW patrols.
- 7 March – 4 May 1945: The squadron again took part in bombing raids on the Japanese-held island of Yap. Reconnaissance patrols were conducted daily in the vicinity of Nugla Island. Four more bombing missions were carried out against Yap through 17 April 1945. On 4 May 1945, administrative and operational control of the squadron was transferred to FAW-18.
- 25 May – 1 June 1945: VPB-22 was temporarily withdrawn from combat and patrol missions for training in use of the Sonobuoy for ASW patrols. On 1 June 1945, the squadron completed its training and recommenced long-range reconnaissance and ASW patrols.
- 23 June 1945: The squadron relocated to Saipan and based ashore as transients pending transfer to Eniwetok. During this interval USS Cumberland Sound steamed from Ulithi to Eniwetok.
- 25 June 1945: Six crews and aircraft were detached as an advance party to Parry Island, Eniwetok, under FAW-2. Duties consisted of long-range patrols around the clock. The remainder of the squadron joined the detachment at Parry Island on 30 June 1945, with all hands aboard the tender USS Cumberland Sound. The squadron was assigned long-range flights and night ASW missions through August.
- 7 August 1945: VPB-22 was transferred back to Saipan, and again went ashore into transient quarters, pending further transfer. On 9 August an advance party of six aircraft proceeded to Chimu Wan, Okinawa. The remainder of the squadron arrived on by 19 August and shifted to quarters aboard the recently arrived USS Cumberland Sound. On 16 August the squadron moved from Cumberland Sound to USS Norton Sound.
- 1 September 1945: The squadron commenced operations from Chimu Wan, Okinawa, conducting long-range patrols along the coastlines of Japan and China. These operations were halted on 16 September, when the squadron was relocated to NAS Sangley Point, Philippines, to avoid a tropical storm.
- 23 September 1945: USS Norton Sound had steamed ahead to Sasebo, Japan, when the squadron moved temporarily to the Philippines. On the 23rd, VPB-22 flew to the harbor of the former Imperial Japanese Navy base at Sasebo, where Norton Sound was at anchor. On the 28th, squadron personnel were shifted to the tender USS Pine Island. On 30 September 1945, the squadron was transferred to the operational and administrative control of FAW-17.
- 1 December 1945: The squadron was recalled to NAS Kaneohe Bay, pending transportation back to the United States. Transportation was arranged by 5 December, and all hands departed for NAS San Diego for rest and rehabilitation leave.
- 20 January 1946: VPB-22 was reformed at NAS San Diego for training and duties as a ferry command.
- 3 February – 28 April 1947: VP-MS-2 was transferred to USS Duxbury Bay for seaplane handling, plane refueling, arming and towing training. On 28 April, the same training evolutions were carried out aboard USS Floyds Bay.
- 20 October 1947 – 30 April 1948: The squadron began a split deployment to Buckner Bay, Okinawa; Yokosuka, Japan; and Qingdao, China. VP-MS-2 relieved VP-MS-11, with its administrative headquarters at Qingdao. On 27 February 1948, the administrative command relocated to Tanapag Harbor, Saipan. The squadron returned to NAS San Diego on 30 April 1948, under the operational control of FAW-14.
- 14 July 1950 – April 1951: VP-42 departed NAS San Diego for NAF Iwakuni, Japan. Upon arrival on the 19th, the squadron was immediately transferred to NAF Yokosuka where it conducted 24-hour ASW patrols of shipping lanes between Japan and Korea in the Tsushima Strait. At the end of August 1950 the squadron returned to NAF Iwakuni where it remained for the rest of the deployment. From Iwakuni squadron aircraft patrolled the Korean coastline and conducted searches for mines on the surface near the shipping lanes. On 7 January 1951, one VP-42 Mariner was damaged on landing and written off. No casualties resulted from the incident. The squadron returned to NAS San Diego in April 1951.
- 22 November 1951 – June 1952: VP-42 returned to Iwakuni, for another deployment and conducted operations in the Korean combat zone. The squadron conducted ASW patrols, anti-mine searches, over-water search and reconnaissance, and anti-shipping and barrier patrols. On 15 March 1952, the squadron conducted advanced base operations from Chinhae Air Base, South Korea, returning to Iwakuni in early April. The squadron returned to its home port in June 1952.
- 11 May 1952: A squadron aircraft was attacked by MiG-15s while on reconnaissance patrol over the Yellow Sea near the Korean coast. The seaplane returned to base safely although it had been hit in the wing by 20-mm cannon fire.
- April 1963: VP-42 received its first SP-2E Neptune, replacing the last SP-5B Marlin seaplane by the end of August 1963.
- 1 June 1964: VP-42 deployed for the first time as a land-based Neptune squadron to MCAS Iwakuni, Japan. During the deployment detachments were maintained at NS Sangley Point, Philippines, and Tan Son Nhut Air Base, South Vietnam, marking the squadron's first return to a combat zone since the Korean War.
- 17 November 1964: Upon its return to the U.S., the squadron was based at NAS Whidbey Island, Washington, its new official home port since 30 June. Upon arrival of all personnel, transition training was begun from the SP-2E to the SP-2H airframe.
- November 1964: VP-42 and VP-28 assisted in the training of Japanese aircrews from the Japan Maritime Self-Defense Force First Air Wing in the SP-2E Neptune. ASW training was conducted in the coastal waters adjacent to NAS Whidbey Island.
- 1 October 1965 – April 1966: VP-42 deployed to MCAS Iwakuni, Japan. Five months were spent participating in Operation Market Time while based at Cam Ranh Bay Air Base, South Vietnam. VP-42 also provided support for Operation Double Eagle, amphibious landings conducted near Quảng Ngai City, South Vietnam, from 28 January to 1 March 1966. While supporting this operation the squadron received small arms fire on more than half a dozen occasions.
- 1 April – December 1967: VP-42 relieved VP-17 at NS Sangley Point. One detachment of six aircraft was assigned to Tan Son Nhut Air Base. On 30 May the remainder of the squadron transferred to Cam Ranh Bay Naval Air Facility in support of Market Time patrols. The squadron returned to NAS North Island on 1 December 1967, having flown 590 combat missions without casualties.
- 14 December 1967: A VP-42 SP-2H disappeared en route from NAS Kodiak, Alaska, to NAS Whidbey Island. No trace of the aircraft was found until it was spotted near Sea Otter Glacier, Mount Fairweather, Alaska, in the fall of 1982. Remains of three crew members were identified and returned for burial.
- 10 March 1968: The squadron conducted its final deployment to WestPac, with the majority of the squadron based at NS Sangley Point and a detachment at NAF Cam Ranh Bay.
- 26 September 1969: VP-42 was disestablished at NAS Whidbey Island.

== Aircraft assignments ==
The squadron was assigned the following aircraft, effective on the dates shown:

- PBM-3D – July 1944
- P5M – November 1953
- SP-2E – April 1963
- SP-2H – November 1964

== Home port assignments ==
The squadron was assigned to these home ports, effective on the dates shown:

- NAAS Harvey Point, North Carolina – 7 April 1944
- NAS Alameda, California – 18 July 1944
- NAS Kaneohe Bay, Hawaii – 25 August 1944
- NAS San Diego, California – 1 December 1945
- NAS Whidbey Island, Washington – 30 June 1964

== See also ==
- Maritime patrol aircraft
- List of inactive United States Navy aircraft squadrons
- List of United States Navy aircraft squadrons
- List of squadrons in the Dictionary of American Naval Aviation Squadrons
- History of the United States Navy
