= VP-40 (1951–present) =

Patrol Squadron 40
- VP-40 insignia
- Active: 15 September 1951 - present
- Country: United States
- Branch: United States Navy
- Type: Squadron
- Role: Maritime Patrol
- Part of: Commander, Patrol and Reconnaissance Wing Ten
- Garrison/HQ: Naval Air Station Whidbey Island
- Nickname: Fighting Marlins
- Engagements: Korean War; Vietnam War; Gulf War'; Operation Enduring Freedom

Aircraft flown
- Patrol: PBM-5/5S; P5M-1/2/SP-5B; P-3B/C; P-8A

VP-40 is a Patrol Squadron of the U.S. Navy. The squadron was established on 20 January 1951. It is the second squadron to be designated VP-40, the first VP-40 was disestablished on 25 January 1950.

== Operational history ==
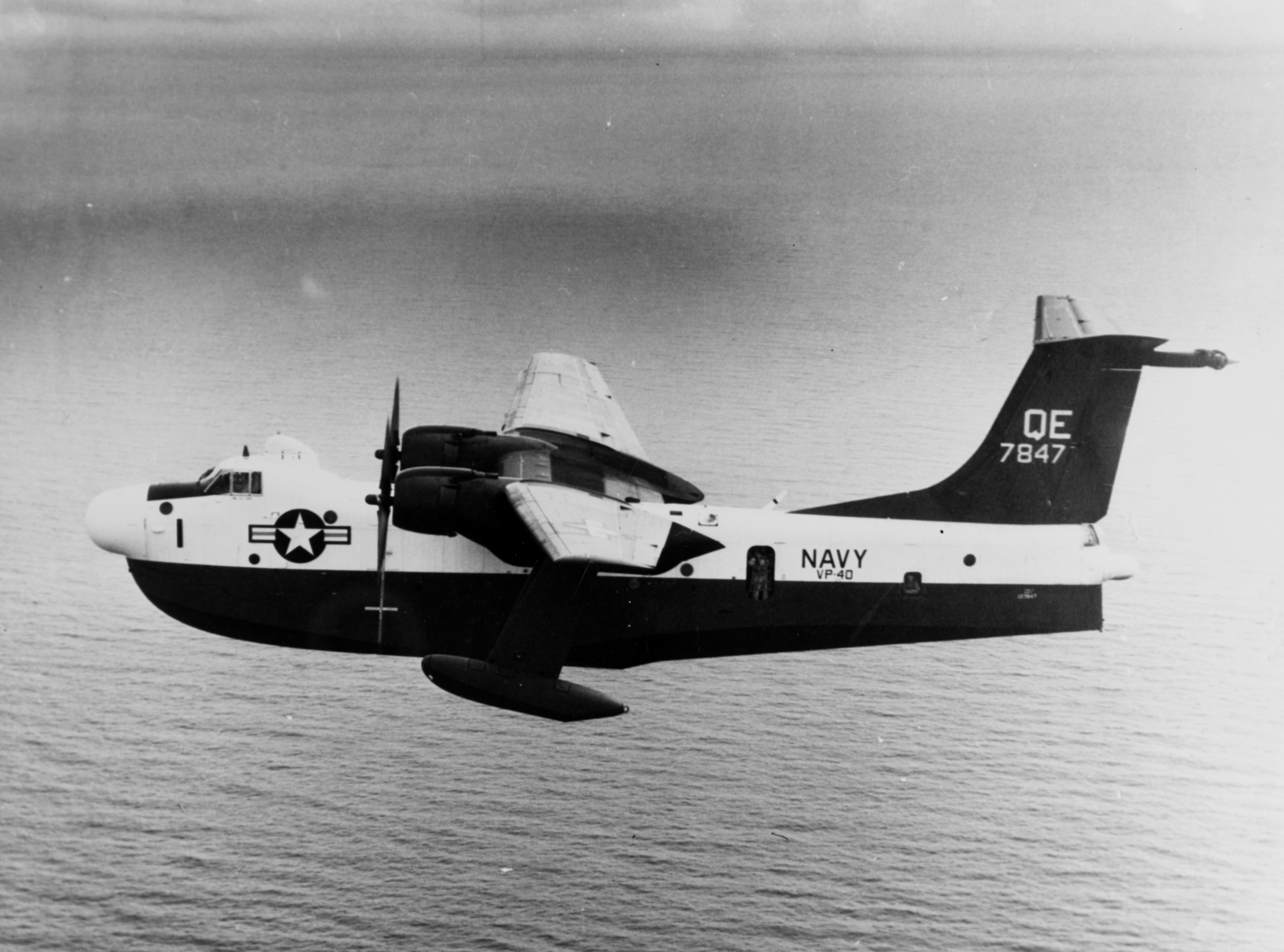
VP-40 P5M-2 c.1960

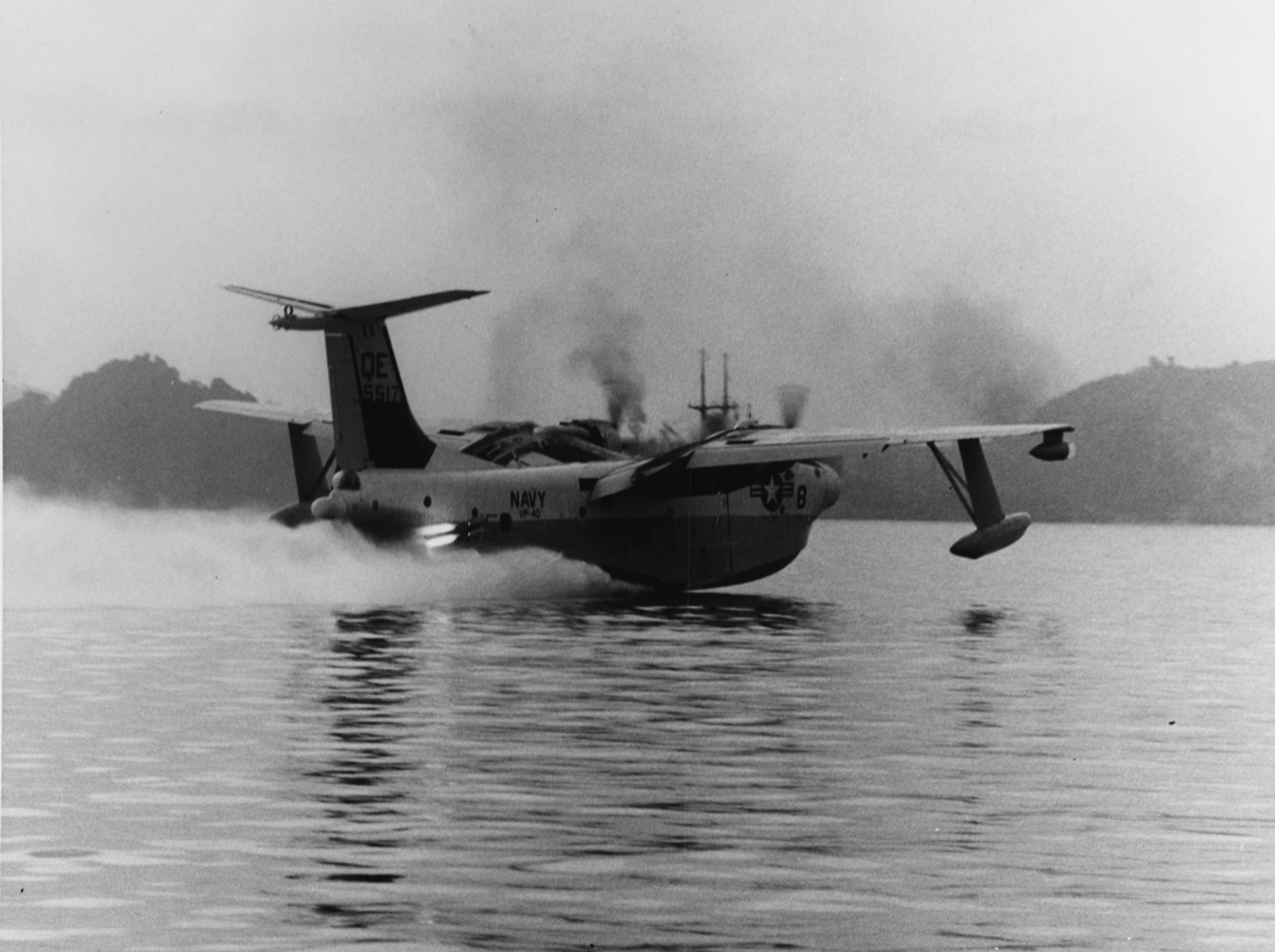
VP-40 SP-5B makes JATO takeoff from Cam Ranh Bay, 1967

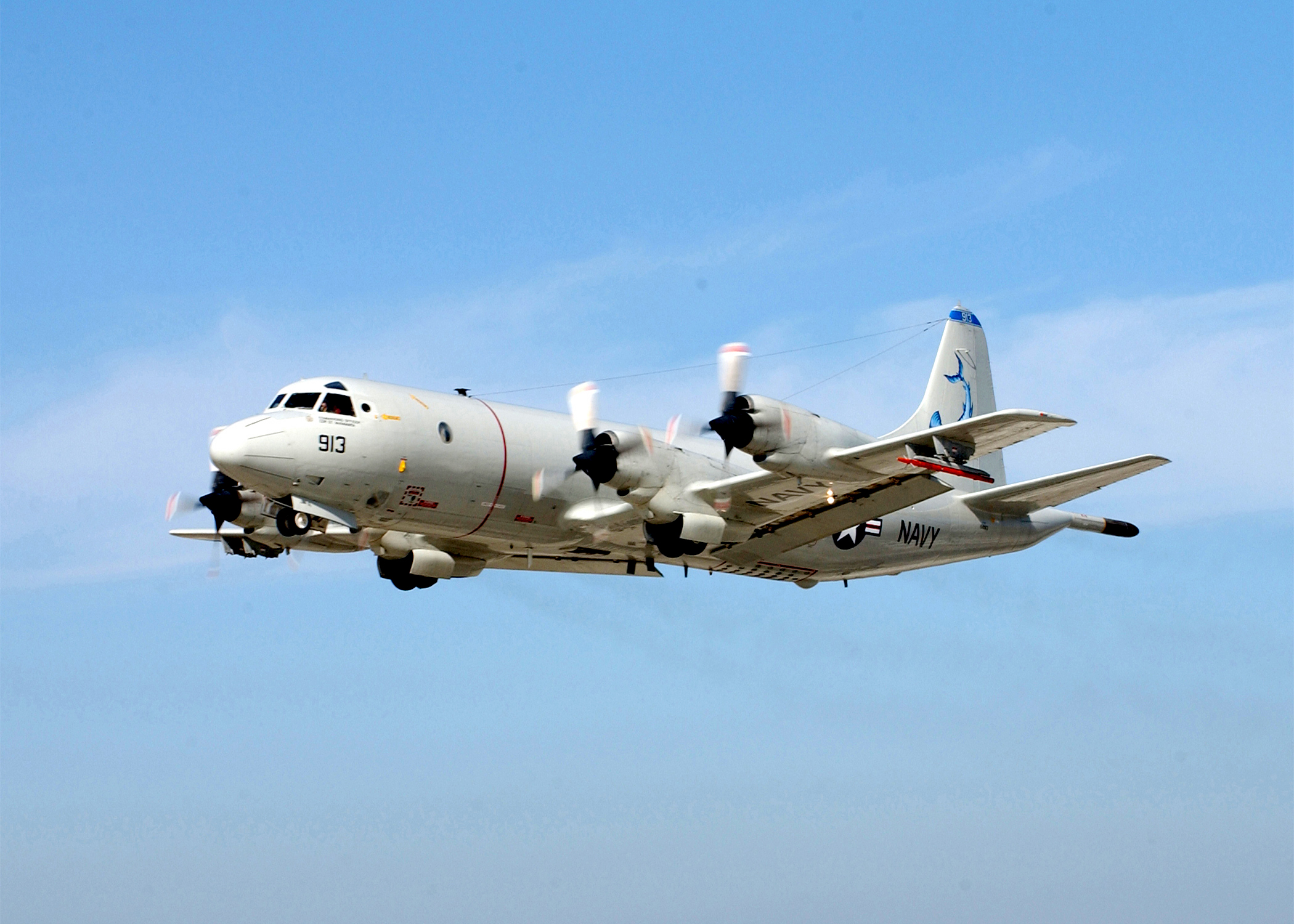
VP-40 P-3C in 2003

- 20 January 1951: VP-40 was established at NAS San Diego, California, under the operational control of FAW-14, as a seaplane squadron flying the PBM-5 Mariner.
- 15 May – 12 December 1951: The squadron conducted its first operational deployment to MCAS Iwakuni, Japan. Part of VP-40's complement of aircraft had been augmented prior to deployment with new PBM-5S aircraft. Upon arrival the squadron came under the operational control of FAW-6, relieving VP-892. The squadron's first combat patrols during the Korean War were flown on 9 June 1951. Over the next six months VP-40 patrolled the Tsushima Strait, flew cover for replenishment groups in the Yellow Sea and Sea of Japan and made weather reconnaissance flights for the fleet forces.
- 2 September 1952: VP-40 deployed to NS Sangley Point, Philippines, with operations conducted from Okinawa and the Pescadore Islands, relieving VP-892. During this period the squadron came under the operational control of FAW-2, patrolling the Formosa Strait. VP-40 returned to NAS San Diego in April and began refitting with the new P5M-1 Marlin seaplane.
- 1 July 1958: Six VP-40 P5M-2s landed at Bangkok, Thailand, the first occasion on which any U.S. seaplane squadron had visited the city.
- 1 August 1959: The squadron home port was changed from NAS San Diego to NS Sangley Point, to become the first permanently based seaplane patrol squadron in the Pacific. During the deployment the squadron adopted the motto "Laging Handa," Tagalog for "always ready."
- 2 August 1962: The VP-40 commanding officer, Commander N. P. Vegelan, and 11 of his crew were killed when aircraft QE-1 crashed into the side of a mountain.
- 22 March 1964: Six month deployments for WestPac patrol squadrons were resumed, necessitating a change in VP-40's home port back to NAS North Island, California.
- 27 February 1965: VP-40 deployed to NS Sangley Point, relieving VP-47. During the deployment the squadron received tender support from USS Salisbury Sound and USS Currituck, while conducting operations from remote sites at Koh Samui, Thailand; Con Son Islands and Danang, South Vietnam.
- 15 March 1966: VP-40 deployed to NS Sangley Point, with detachments at various locations throughout WestPac tended by USS Salisbury Sound.
- 1 March 1967: Seaplane tender USS Currituck participated in the last official tender operation in a combat zone with the Navy while supporting VP-40 operations. During the Vietnam War VP-40 had rotated assignments with VP-50 out of NS Sangley Point and Cam Ranh Bay, South Vietnam, supported by tenders USS Currituck, USS Salisbury Sound and USS Pine Island. This was the last deployment for VP-40 as a seaplane squadron.
- 17 May 1967: Commander Hugh E. Longino, VP-40 commanding officer, conducted the last patrol in a squadron SP-5B over the South China Sea during the squadron's deployment to the Philippines. Later that month, the NS Sangley Point seadrome was closed and all remaining SP-5B aircraft were flown to Kōnan, Japan, where they were dismantled for scrap.
- 15 November 1967: The last flight of a SP-5B took place, marking the move of the squadron from NAS San Diego to NAS Moffett Field, California, and the transition to the land-based P-3B Orion. The ceremonial flight closed an era of Navy seaplane operations that had begun in 1911.
- 12 July 1968: The last SP-5B Marlin was flown from NAS San Diego to NAS Patuxent River, Maryland, for addition to the historic aircraft preservation program of the National Air and Space Museum. This aircraft is now on display at the National Naval Aviation Museum, NAS Pensacola, Florida.
- 1 February 1969: VP-40 made their first deployment in the P-3B to MCAS Iwakuni, relieving VP-4. Advanced base elements were maintained at Cam Ranh Bay Air Base, South Vietnam. Operations consisted of surveillance air patrols in the Sea of Japan, Sea of Okhotsk and North Pacific. Anti-infiltration patrols were conducted in the Yellow Sea in search of North Korean agent boats. Similar patrols were flown from NAF Cam Ranh Bay, Vietnam, against Viet Cong infiltration and supply routes.
- 15 April 1969: VP-40 assisted in the efforts to locate survivors of a Navy EC-121 shot down by the North Koreans in the Sea of Japan. Of 30 crewmembers in the missing aircraft, only 2 bodies were recovered; 28 were listed as missing.
- 1 May 1970: VP-40 deployed to NS Sangley Point, with a detachment at U-Tapao Royal Thai Navy Airfield, Thailand. The squadron participated on a regular basis in Operation Market Time patrols along the 100 miles (160 km) coastline of South Vietnam.
- 14 July 1971: VP-40 deployed to Okinawa with its new DIFAR-equipped aircraft, the first deployment of this aircraft by any WestPac patrol squadron. DIFAR (directional low frequency analysis and recording) was used in Anti-submarine warfare (ASW) for passive acoustic signal processing in tracking enemy submarines. A detachment was also maintained full-time at NAS Agana, Guam. In addition to participation in a multitude of operations throughout the Pacific, the squadron took part in experimental cloud seeding missions in the skies over Okinawa in an attempt to relieve the unusual drought conditions afflicting the region. The squadron returned to NAS Moffett Field in late December 1971, leaving a detachment at NAS Cubi Point, Philippines, in the event of further escalation of events in the Pakistan/India dispute.
- 1 August 1972: VP-40 deployed to MCAS Iwakuni, Japan, with a detachment at U-Tapao.
- 10 August 1975: In an experimental departure from routine WestPac deployments, VP-40 participated in a series of detachment deployments consisting of three aircraft and four aircrew elements assigned to NAS Adak, Alaska, for a nine-month period. Deployments ended 10 May 1976 with the return of the last aircraft to NAS Moffett Field.
- 3 July 1980: VP-40 deployed to NAF Misawa, Japan, with two-crew detachments at NAS Cubi Point and Diego Garcia. In August VP-40 was the first on the scene of a Soviet Echo class nuclear submarine casualty in the Philippine Sea, observing closely the ensuing Soviet rescue and recovery operations.
- June 1983: VP-40 deployed to NAF Misawa with a two-crew detachment at Diego Garcia. In July, a second detachment was established at NAF Atsugi, Japan, to conduct exercises with the Japan Maritime Self-Defense Force, ASW Operations Center.
- 1 September 1983: VP-40 engaged in the search for survivors and the flight data recorder of Korean Air Lines Flight 007, the South Korean airliner shot down by a Soviet interceptor. During the search the squadron had frequent encounters with Soviet fighter aircraft.
- January 1985: VP-40 deployed to NAF Keflavik, Iceland for 6 months to conduct ASW operations against Soviet subs. Upon return to NAS Moffett Field, VP-40 transitioned to the P-3C UIII aircraft.
- July 1986: VP-40 conducted a split deployment to Kadena AFB, Okinawa and NAF Misawa, Japan conducting both ASW and ASuW missions in the WESTPAC theater.
- January 1988: VP-40 conducted a split deployment to Kadena AFB, Okinawa and NAF Misawa, Japan conducting both ASW and ASuW missions in the WESTPAC theater.
- February 1991: VP-40 deployed to NAF Misawa, Japan. During the deployment the squadron participated in Operation Desert Storm, operating from the island of Diego Garcia, flying sorties in support of the Persian Gulf operations.
- 10 March 1992: VP-40 celebrated 25 years of accident-free flying, one of only two P-3 squadrons to lay claim to this achievement as of that date.
- 13 November 1992: VP-40 began a multi-site deployment with detachments at NAS Adak; Howard AFB, Panama; and Acapulco, Mexico. The detachments at the latter sites were in support of the drug interdiction program in the Central America region, Joint Task Force Four. During the deployment the squadron began replacing all of its P-3C UIII aircraft with P-3C UII.5 versions from VP-31. The change was necessitated by the pending change of home base from NAS Moffett Field to NAS Brunswick, Maine, where all of the patrol aircraft were the UII.5 version.
- March 2019: VP-40 departed for Bahrain’s Isa Air Base and Okinawa's Kadena Air Base on the U.S. Navy's final deployment of the P-3 with an active-duty squadron.
- 14 May 2020: VP-40 completed the transition to the P-8 Poseidon, the final active-duty Navy squadron to do so.

== Aircraft assignments ==
The squadron was assigned the following aircraft, effective on the dates shown:

- PBM-5 - January 1951
- PBM-5S - May 1951
- P5M-1 - April 1953
- P5M-2 - 1957
- SP-5B - October 1960
- P-3B - November 1967
- P-3B DIFAR - December 1970
- P-3C - September 1974
- P-3C UIII - July 1985
- P-3C UII.5 - 1992/1993
- P-3C UIII - 1993
- P-8A - 2020

== Home port assignments ==
The squadron was assigned to these home ports, effective on the dates shown:

- NAS San Diego, California - 20 January 1951
- NS Sangley Point, Philippines - 1 August 1959
- NAS North Island, San Diego - 15 November 1963
- NAS Moffett Field, California - 15 November 1967
- NAS Whidbey Island, Washington - 1993

== See also ==
- Maritime patrol aircraft
- List of United States Navy aircraft squadrons
- List of inactive United States Navy aircraft squadrons
- List of squadrons in the Dictionary of American Naval Aviation Squadrons
- History of the United States Navy
