= USS Currituck (AV-7) =

Currituck class seaplane tender

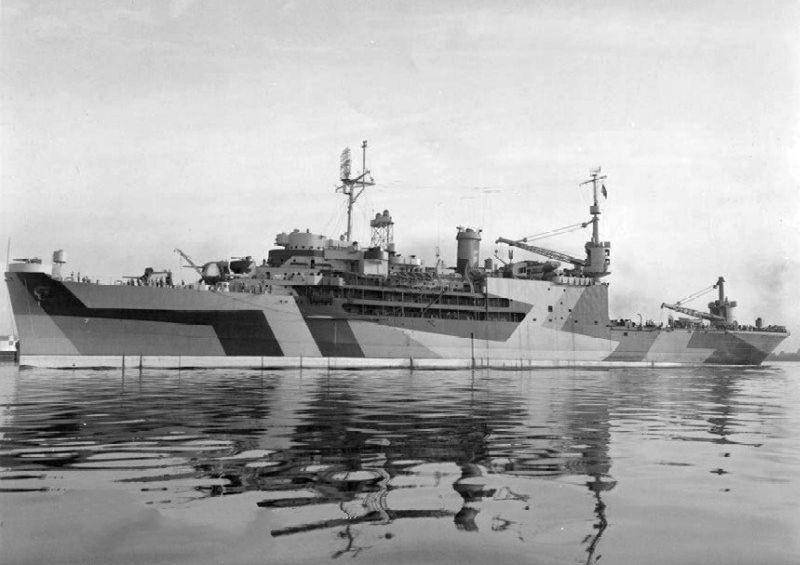
- USS Currituck in 1944

History

United States
- Name: USS Currituck
- Namesake: Currituck Sound
- Builder: Philadelphia Navy Yard
- Laid down: 14 December 1942
- Launched: 11 September 1943
- Commissioned: 26 June 1944
- Decommissioned: 31 October 1967
- Stricken: 1 April 1971
- Fate: Sold for scrapping, 1971
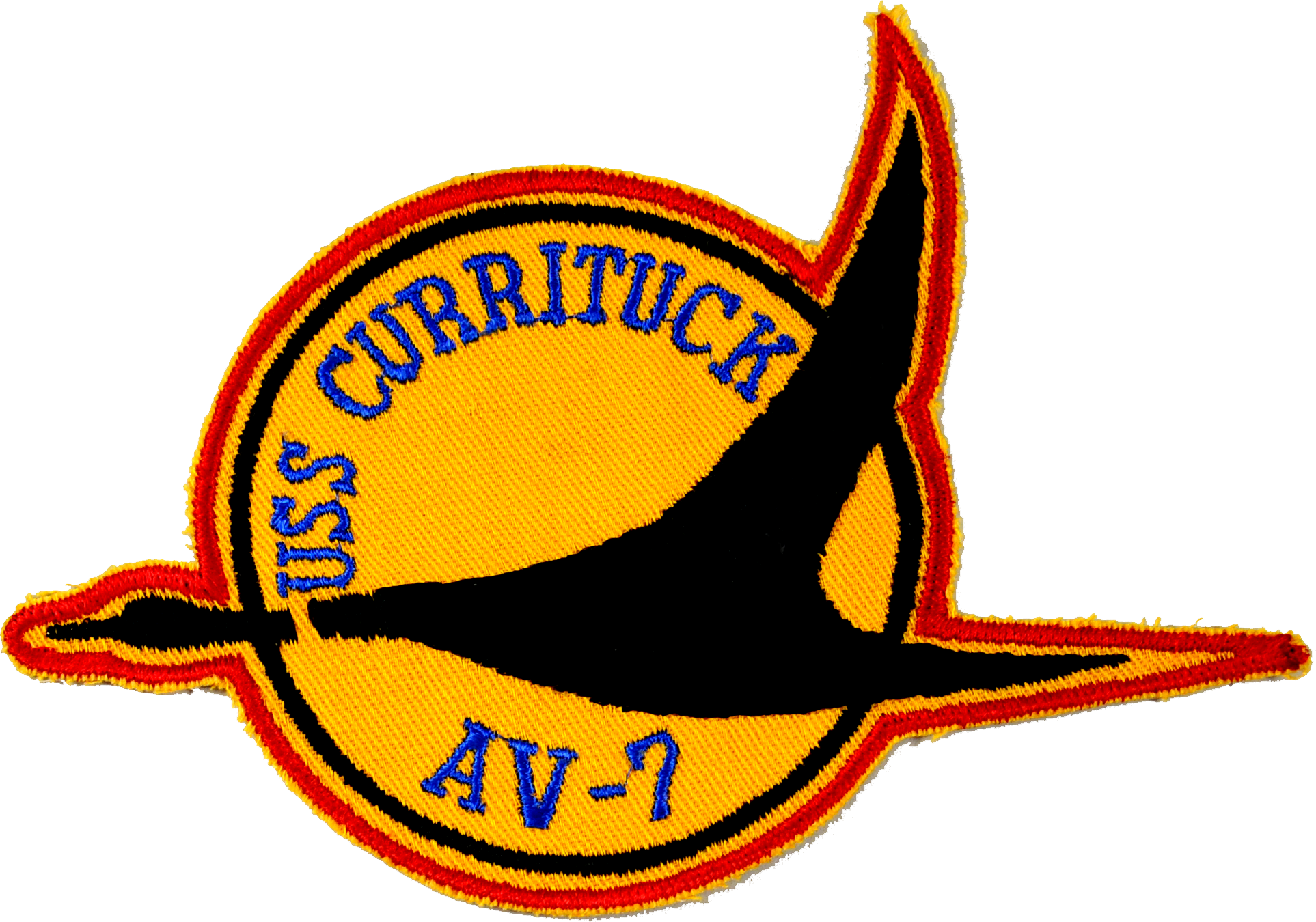
- Badge

General characteristics
- Class & type: Currituck-class seaplane tender
- Displacement: 14,000 tons (full load)
- Length: 540 ft 5 in (164.72 m)
- Beam: 69 ft 3 in (21.11 m)
- Draft: 22 ft 3 in (6.78 m)
- Propulsion: Steam turbines; 4 × boilers; 2 × shafts; 12,000 shp (9.0 MW)
- Speed: 19 knots (35 km/h)
- Complement: 1,247
- Armament: 4 × 5"/38 DP guns

USS Currituck (AV-7) was the first of four Currituck class seaplane tenders, and was nicknamed the Wild Goose. She was built during World War II and served during the Cold War.

The second US ship to be named for the Currituck Sound, Currituck was launched 11 September 1943 by Philadelphia Navy Yard; sponsored by Mrs. M. F. Draemel; and commissioned 26 June 1944.

== World War II Service ==
Currituck put to sea from Philadelphia on 31 August 1944 bound for duty with the Pacific Fleet. At Balboa, Panama, she embarked passengers for transportation to Manus, then continued on to Mios Woendi to unload cargo. She carried men and airplane spare parts and supplies for USS Tangier from Manus to Morotai, then returned to Mios Woendi briefly before arriving in San Pedro Bay, Leyte, 6 November to begin tending seaplanes flying missions in the Leyte operations.

Currituck sailed from Leyte on 6 January 1945 for the initial landings at Lingayen Gulf, Luzon, three days later, and remained there, at Cabalitan Bay, and at Mindoro tending seaplanes and directing seaplane search operations. She returned to Leyte 5 February, then sailed for Manila on 3 March. Upon her arrival three days later she sent boarding parties to inspect abandoned Japanese vessels in the harbor. Her tender duties at this port included maintenance of the 76th Wing of the Royal Australian Air Force from 27 April to 6 May.

Departing Manila 10 June 1945 Currituck maintained a base for seaplanes conducting night searches from Lingayen Gulf between 11 June and 20 August, then returned to Manila 24 August. She sailed for Okinawa on 30 August.

Currituck remained in the Far East in support of the reoccupation of mainland China, tending seaplanes at Jinsen (Inchon), Korea, and Shanghai, Tsingtao and Taku, China, returning to Okinawa 28 October. She got underway for the United States on 9 December and arrived at San Francisco 30 December.

== Post World War II 1946–47 service ==
In 1946, Currituck and USS Pine Island served in the Antarctic expedition Operation Highjump.

After operations from this port and San Diego, she sailed 2 December 1946, participated in the Antarctic Operation Highjump, touched at the Marquesas Islands and visited Sydney, Australia, from 13 to 20 March 1947. She returned by way of the Panama Canal to Norfolk, Va., arriving 18 April. Currituck was placed in reserve 7 August 1947, berthed at Philadelphia.

== 1950s ==
Recommissioned 1 August 1951, Currituck got underway 17 December for Norfolk. From this port she operated locally and in the Caribbean, primarily on training duty. She departed Norfolk 23 August 1952 for a cruise which included visits to Trondheim, Norway, and Leith, Scotland, returning to her home port 17 October. After local operations and a brief voyage to Bermuda, she sailed again from Norfolk 24 August 1953, passing through the Panama Canal for operations around the Galápagos Islands, and returning to Norfolk 25 September. On 6 July 1954 she cleared for a European cruise, calling at Milford Haven, Wales, continuing to Taranto, Italy, and touching again at Milford Haven and Portsmouth before returning to Norfolk 18 September.

Between 26 August and 13 December 1956 Currituck served with the US 6th Fleet in the Mediterranean, returning to training cruises to the Caribbean and local operations at Norfolk until 9 January 1958 when she entered the Philadelphia Naval Shipyard.

== 1960–1964 ==
USS Currituck was re-commissioned on 20 August 1960 and following a shakedown and training cruise along the East Coast and Caribbean, steamed through the Panama Canal to her new home port of San Diego, California, arriving on 3 December 1960.

On a pre-deployment exercise USS Currituck operated with VP-42, attached to NAS North Island, for two days at a seadrome established at White Cove, Santa Catalina Island, California. VP-42 was operating nine Martin P5M Marlins.

Currituck deployed to the Western Pacific on 27 June 1961 on her first tour where she served as Flagship for Commander, Taiwan Patrol Force, Rear Admiral Bernard M. Strean. This force, comprising both air and surface patrol, provided surveillance patrols along the coast lines of Soviet Siberia, North Korea, North Vietnam and mainland China.

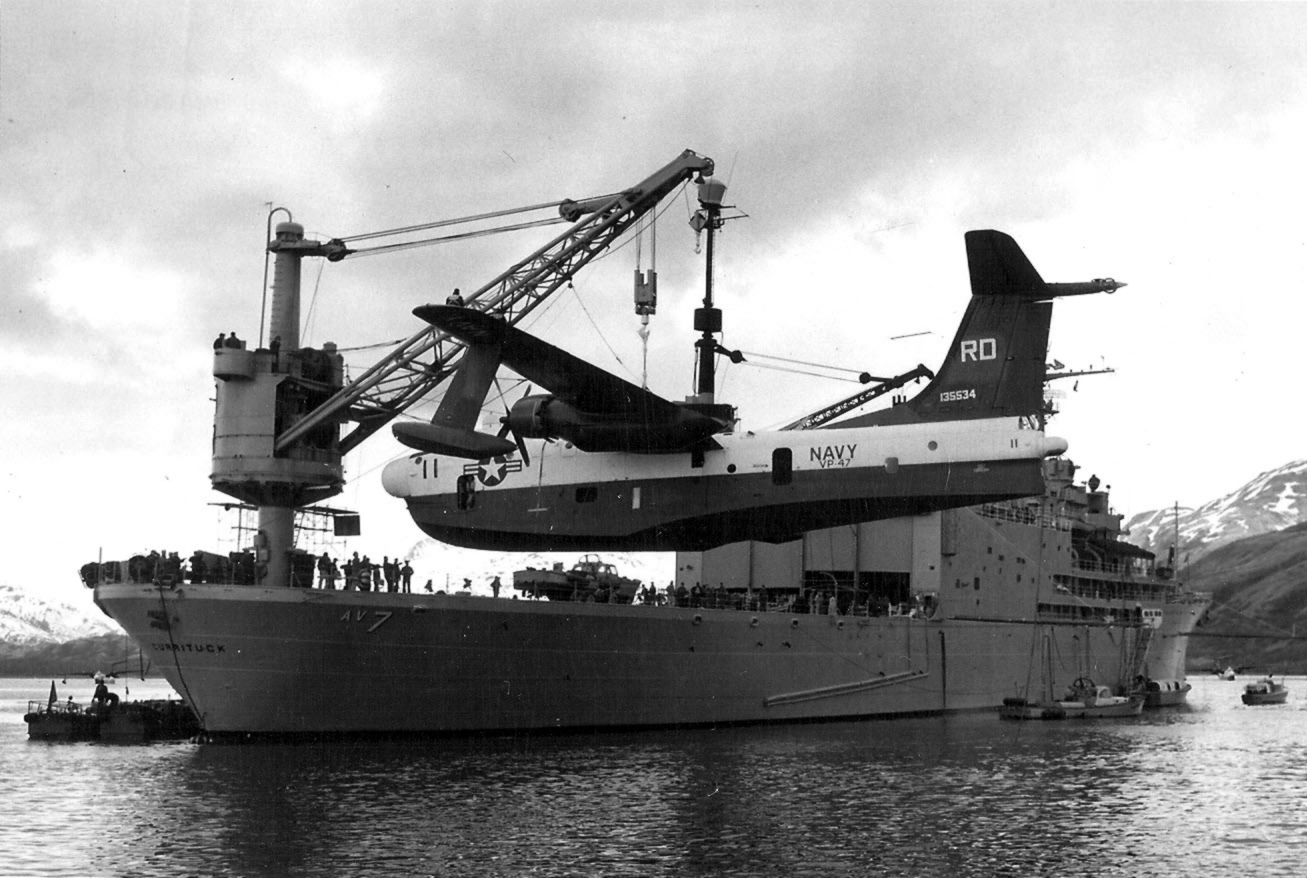
VP-47 P5M is hoisted aboard Currituck at Kodiak, Alaska, 1962

In a warm-up cruise, prior to her next West-Pac deployment, Currituck made an Alaskan voyage that spanned the Aleutian Islands, operating with VP-47 equipped with P5Ms. Currituck, on this operation, provided the rare opportunity to visit the port of Anchorage, Alaska, and became the largest ship ever to visit that port. Fifty hours at a buoy were logged by VP-47's Commanding Officer and his crew. They and a storm arrived at Cold Bay at the same time. Transfer to Currituck by small boat was impossible.

Prior to deployment the crew of Currituck said good bye to Chief Aviation Machinist Mate Otto Keller. Keller was at the time the senior chief in the US Navy, having joined the navy in 1908. The Secretary of the Navy participated in Keller's retirement ceremony.

Currituck began her second West-Pac tour on 26 October 1962. The ship arrived in Yokosuka, Japan on 11 November 1962 when she again took on Commander, Taiwan Patrol Force, Rear Admiral Bernard M. Strean. She sailed for Buckner Bay, Okinawa on 17 November 1962. After two days at sea lookouts sighted the Japanese fishing vessel Seiyu Maru, which had been damaged in a typhoon, and without power. Currituck took her in tow and passed food and clothing to her crew. After a night of careful watch, she was transferred to a Japanese rescue vessel and Currituck steamed on to Okinawa, where she arrived on 20 November 1962 at her new "Home Port" of White Beach.

On 1 December 1962 the flag changed command. Rear Admiral Robert Anthony Macpherson took command as commander, Patrol Force Seventh Fleet – commander, Fleet Air Wing One – commander, Taiwan Patrol Force – commander, Task Force 72.5. Currituck remained at White Beach until 3 December 1962, when she departed for Cebu, The Philippines.

Currituck arrived in Cebu, Philippines on 6 December 1962 where, after intensive day and night seaplane operations with VP-40 from Naval Station Sangley Point, Cavite City, Philippines, she departed on 10 December 1962 for Manila Bay. Currituck dropped anchor off Sangley Point on 12 December 1962 and remained until 15 December 1962.

On 18 December 1962 Currituck arrived back in Buckner Bay, Okinawa where she tied up to pier "Bravo" at White Beach. The Surrey Singers from Oklahoma City University entertained on board. A few members of the crew were lucky enough to see Bob Hope and his Troupe entertain at the US Army's Stillwell Field House on 23 December 1962. The crew had a Christmas party for Okinawan children, but it appeared that the sailors may have had the most fun. Both Protestant and Catholic Christmas services were held on Board. Currituck departed on 7 January 1963 for Manila.

Arriving in Manila Bay, Philippines on 10 January 1963, for a seven-day stay. One of the highlights of this visit was the tour of the island of Corregidor, with the Barracks as a grim reminder of the event that occurred here during World War II. Currituck departed Manila Bay on 16 January 1963 bound for Buckner Bay.

Currituck arrived in Buckner Bay on 19 January 1963, where she remained until 11 February 1963.

En route to Hong Kong, Currituck stopped off at Koshsiung, Taiwan on 13 February 1963 where the visit was highlighted by the Seven Seas from Tsoying Naval Base who entertained the crew with a variety show. Than at sea again on 15 February 1963 and arriving in Hong Kong on 16 February 1963. Mary Soo's girls took on the job of painting some of the ship while the crew set about seeing the Tiger Balm Gardens, Sanpan Village at Aberdeen, and a seven-course Chinese dinner at the Tai Pak. On 22 February 1963 Currituck sailed, once again, for White Beach.

25 February 1963 saw Currituck back at Pier "Bravo", White Beach, Okinawa. On the morning of 9 March 1963 the crew awoke to see one of the seaplanes with its starboard wing and engine completely under water. The V-Divisions set about the rescue work, loaded the plane on board, and on 10 March 1963 steamed for Kobe, Japan. Currituck arrived in Kobe, Japan on 12 March 1963, offloaded the damaged plane and got under way the same day, to pick up another downed plane of VP-50 in Ominato, Japan. Currituck arrived in snow-covered Ominato, Japan on 16 March 1963, found the plane and some cold aviators, and another hoisting. With the plane and crew safely on board, Currituck departed the same day.

After a transit of the Shimonoseki Straits,Currituck arrived in Iwakuni, Japan on 19 March 1963. While in Iwakuni the crew visited neighboring Hiroshima where they visited the Castle and Ground zero, the spot where the first Atomic Bomb hit Japan. Underway on 23 March 1963 Currituck arrived at Yokosuka, Japan on 25 March 1963. On 1 April 1963, Pine Island arrived, and the flag was transferred. On 2 April 1963 Currituck departed West-Pac for her home port of San Diego, California, arriving on 19 April 1963.

June 1963 saw Currituck operating from a seadrone at White Cove, Santa Catalina Island, California for one week of day and night seaplane operations with VP-48.

Currituck began her third West-Pac tour departing San Diego on 26 January 1964. After 23 days of steaming she arrived in Naha, Okinawa on 18 February 1964. Operating in Lingayen Gulf in exercise "Minute Hand", the location of her seadrone in January 1945, some twenty year's prior, this time servicing VP-48. Returning to Manila she participated in exercise "LIGTAS", a seven nation, seventy-five ship Task Force with massive amphibious/airborne exercises, during which Currituck served as Command Information Center. Next was a visit to Saigon, South Vietnam, wherein she had to navigate up the Saigon River through hostile territory. Arriving off Saigon, she negotiated a 180 degree turn by making a planned maneuver of running her bow aground on the river bank and swinging her stern upstream until she had reversed herself. Following her assigned duties in West-Pac Currituck returned to her home port of San Diego, California.

== 1965–1971 and fate ==
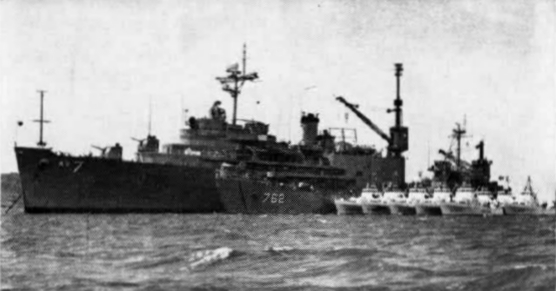
USS Currituck (AV-7) at the end of her 62-day deployment to Con San Island, 1965

Currituck deployed for a subsequent West-Pac cruise on 23 April 1965 to become Flagship Patrol Force Seventh Fleet. After visits to Koh Samui and Bangkok, Thailand she established a seadrome off of Côn Sơn Island, Poulo Condores Islands, South Vietnam on 29 May 1965 and began servicing aircraft of VP-40. During this period Currituck established a number of firsts. On 22 June 1965, Currituck became the first ship of her class to deliver shore bombardment against enemy positions in the Mekong Delta. She also established a record sixty-seven days on continuous seaplane operations in Cam Ranh Bay. Upon leaving South Vietnam, she visited Hong Kong; Keelung and Kaohsiung, Taiwan; Yokosuka, Sasebo and Kobe, Japan; Subic Bay, Zambales, Philippines.

Currituck returned to San Diego on 1 December 1965 and on 13 January 1966 departed for a two-week training cruise with stops at Magdelina Bay and La Paz, Mexico, returning to San Diego on 27 January. She also flew the flag at the Maritime Festival, Vancouver, British Columbia, Canada. Seadrome operations were also conducted in the vicinity of Santa Catalina Island, California on several occasions.

Currituck's final WESTPAC deployment reduced her six-month homeport stay four months, and she left for operations from a seadrome at her anchorage in Cam Ranh Bay, South Vietnam, where she serviced the P5M's of VP-40 during Operation Market Time. Operating from Currituck, VP-40 participated in the last seaplane tender operations conducted by the U.S. Navy and closed this phase of U.S. Naval Aviation History after operating there from 19 March to 12 April 1967. VP-40 logged a total of 860 flight hours, utilizing only seven aircraft from Currituck, which maintained an availability of 94.38%. While operating with the Mobile Riverine Force in South Vietnam Currituck's call sign was "Flying Goose". On 23 May 1967, Currituck returned to her home port of San Diego, California and as the last active seaplane tender in the U.S. Navy.

After twenty-one days back in her home port in late June 1967, Currituck steamed to Seal Beach, California for weapons offload, then to Mare Island at Vallejo, California for decommissioning. She was later towed to Puget Sound Naval Shipyard, Bremerton, Washington. There she joined her remaining class members, and West-Pac sisters; Pine Island (AV-12) and Salisbury Sound (AV-13) already in the same status. She was decommissioned for the last time on 31 October 1967 and laid up in the Pacific Reserve Fleet in Vallejo, CA. She was struck from the Naval Register on 1 April 1971 for disposal, and from the Naval Records on 1 January 1972. She was sold to Union Minerals, and dismantled at Learner Shipyard, Oakland, California in June 1972.

Today one of Currituck's propellers can be seen as the basis of the 'Passing on the Tradition' memorial located on the Louis Memorial Boardwalk in Bremerton, Washington.

== Awards ==
- American Campaign Medal
- Asiatic-Pacific Campaign Medal with two battle stars
- World War II Victory Medal
- Navy Occupation Medal with "Asia" and "Europe" clasps
- China Service Medal
- Antarctic Service Medal
- National Defense Service Medal with bronze service star
- Armed Forces Expeditionary Medal with bronze service star
- Vietnam Service Medal with one campaign star
- Vietnam Cross of Gallantry
- Republic of Vietnam Campaign Medal
