= VP-50 =

Inactive united States Navy maritime patrol squadron

Patrol Squadron 50
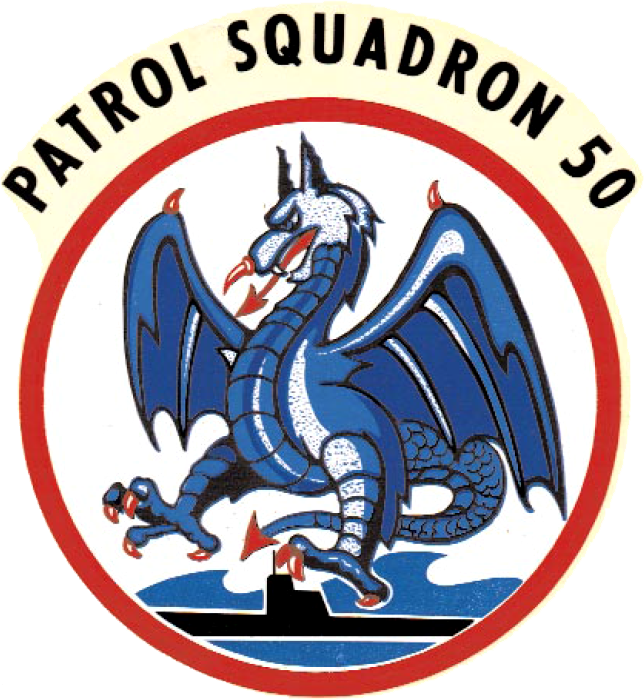
- VP-50 patch
- Active: 18 July 1946 – 30 June 1992
- Country: United States
- Branch: United States Navy
- Type: Maritime patrol squadron
- Role: Maritime patrol
- Nickname(s): Blue Dragons
- Engagements: World War II; Korean War; Vietnam War

Aircraft flown
- Patrol: PBY-5A Catalina; PV-2 Harpoon; PBM-5 Mariner; P5M Marlin; P-3 Orion

VP-50 was a long-lived Patrol Squadron of the U.S. Navy, having held that designation for 39 years from 1953 to 1992. Its nickname was the Blue Dragons. Originally established as VP-917 on 18 July 1946, redesignated Medium Patrol Squadron (Landplane) VP-ML-67 on 15 November 1946, redesignated VP-892 in February 1950, redesignated VP-50 on 4 February 1953 and disestablished on 30 June 1992.

== Operational history ==
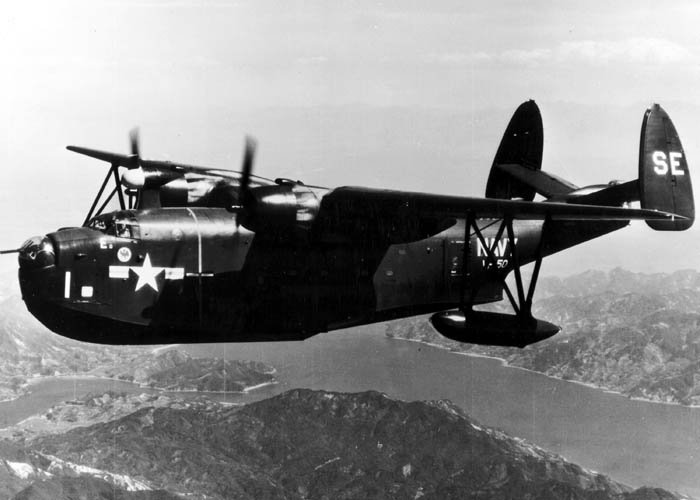
VP-50 PBM-5S in April 1956

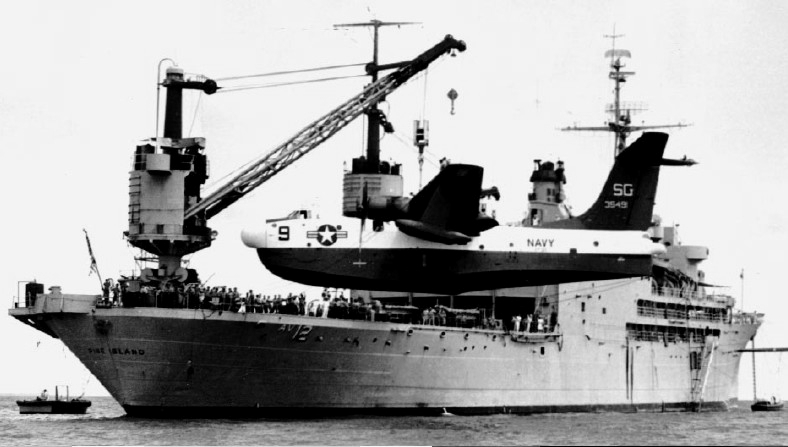
VP-50 SP-5B being lifted aboard USS Pine Island, Cam Ranh Bay 1965

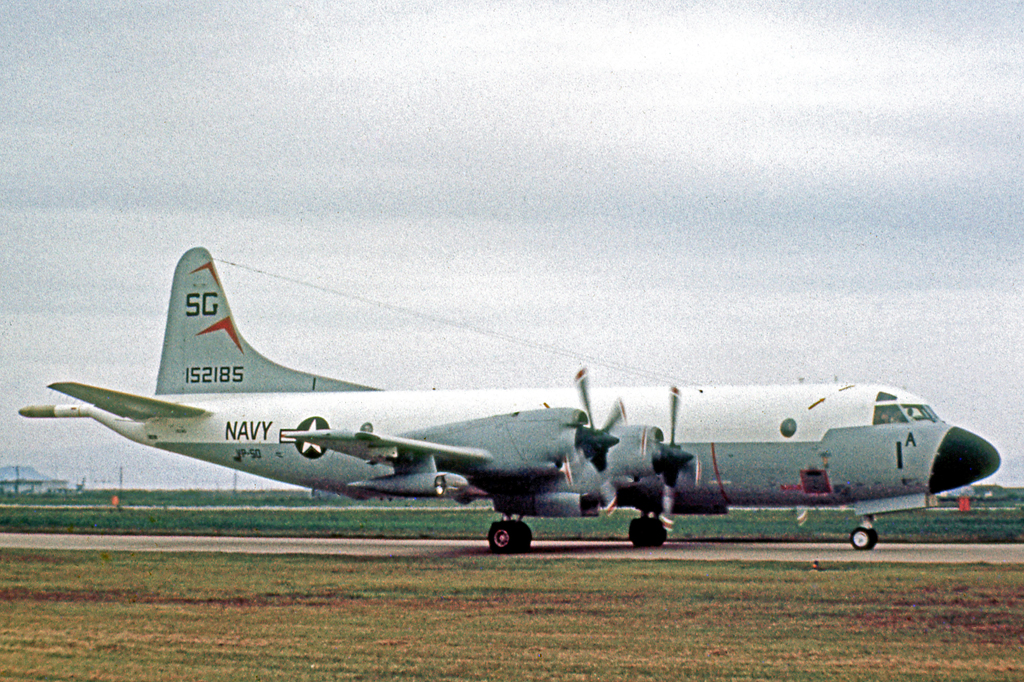
VP-50 P-3A at NAS Moffett Field in 1970

- 18 July 1946: VP-917 was established at NAS Sand Point, near Seattle. The squadron came under the operational control of FAW-14 and administrative control of the Naval Air Reserve Training Command (NARTC). The squadron was one of 21 naval reserve squadrons established after the war to accommodate the large number of aircrews recently released from active duty and utilize the enormous stocks of aircraft in the inventory. The squadron flew the PBY-5A/6A Catalina seaplane and the PV-2 Harpoon landplane.
- 15 November 1946: All patrol squadrons were redesignated. Regular Navy patrol squadron designations began with 1 and reserve patrol squadrons began with 5 or higher. VP-917 was redesignated VP-ML-67. The ML for reserve squadrons included twin-engine medium amphibious seaplanes, as well as twin-engine land-based bombers. Regular Navy patrol squadron ML designations were for twin-engine medium landbased bombers only. The amphibious medium seaplanes like the PBY-5A were in the AM category.
- February 1950: VP-ML-67 was redesignated VP-892 during the reorganization of Naval Aviation Reserve units in 1949, but the change did not take effect until February 1950. During this period the number of Naval Aviation reserve squadrons was reduced from the 1949 total of 24 to 9. By this date the squadron had transitioned to the PBM-5 Mariner.
- 20 July 1950: VP-892 was called to active duty as a result of the Korean War. The squadron reported for duty to Commander Naval Air Force Pacific Fleet at NAS San Diego, Calif. At the start of hostilities the Navy patrol forces on active duty numbered just 20 squadrons, and it quickly became apparent that this meager figure was inadequate to meet the increased demands. By the end of 1950 seven reserve patrol squadrons were called to active duty to augment the active duty Navy patrol squadrons. The squadron reported aboard NAS San Diego on 4 August 1950 for training under FAW-14.
- 23 November 1950: VP-892 began its first deployment at Marine Corps Air Station Iwakuni, Japan, reporting to Commander Fleet Air Japan and FAW-6 on 13 December 1950. During the deployment the squadron was involved in ASW, reconnaissance and weather information flights in the Sea of Japan and along the coasts of China and North Korea. The squadron's first mission was flown on 18 December 1950, making it the first flown by any reserve squadron in the Korean War.
- August 1951: VP-892 returned to NAS San Diego, Calif., to begin transitioning to the PBM-5S/S2 seaplane. The squadron became operational in January 1952.
- 12 February – 1 March 1952: VP-892 deployed to Naval Station Sangley Point, Philippines, for duties under FAW-1. On 1 March 1952, the squadron began its second tour of operations in the Korean combat zone conducting patrols over the China coast and China Sea.
- 1 May–27 July 1953: VP-50 deployed to NAS Sangley Point, with patrol duties covering the South China Sea. On 1 June 1953, a detachment began operations at MCAS Iwakuni, flying patrols in the combat zone over the Korean coastline, Yellow Sea and Sea of Japan. On 30 June 1953, a squadron Mariner sank near Iwakuni while taxiing to test engines. No one was injured or lost, and boats from USS Kenneth Whiting rescued the crew from the water. The tender later made several unsuccessful attempts to raise the sunken aircraft. On 17 July USS Deliverer destroyed the sunken PBM with underwater demolition charges to eliminate any danger to vessels navigating in the area. The detachment rejoined the squadron at NAS Sangley Point on 27 July 1953.
- 1953: While the detachment of VP-50 Squadron began operations at MCAS Iwakuni under the command of NAVY AIR WING SIX flying patrols in the COMBAT ZONE over the Korean coastline, Yellow Sea and Sea of Japan. During this operation VP-50 suffered 4 hostile attacks over the Yellow Sea near the coast of China and 1 PBM Mariner disappeared with a crew of 14, their fate unknown.
- 21 July 1953 PBM-5 Two Chinese MiGs damaged a US Navy PBM-5 Mariner- Yellow Sea.
- 2 October 1953 PBM-5 SE-3 BuNo 84713 - Hostile attack with damage- Yellow Sea
- 6 November 1953 PBM-5 SE-2 BuNo 84747 - Hostile attack - no damage- Yellow Sea
- 7 November 1953 People's Republic of China PLAAF pilot Xicai Lin claimed to have shot down a US Navy PBM-5A Mariner in Qingdao (Tsingtao, China). This might have been BuNo 58152, 10 MADNESS reported lost over the Yellow Sea on 10 November.
- 10 November 1953 PBM-5 SE-10 BuNo 85152 "Possible SOS sent" "Declared Missing"- Yellow Sea
- 10 November 1953 a PBM -5 Mariner BuNo BuNo 85152 call Sign 10 MADNESS disappeared while on patrol of the Yellow Sea with a crew of 14 who were listed as missing from an Operational Loss. In 2005, the crew of 10 MADNESS awarded the Navy Combat Action Ribbon, Purple Heart, Air Medal. The Republic of South Korea bestowed Presidential Unit Citations and Korean War Service Medals.

This is the only hostile shoot down in VP-50 Squadron's long history and the only PBM Mariner shot down during the Cold War.

- 18 November 1953 PBM-5 SE-2 BuNo 84747 - Hostile attack - no damage
- 31 August 1954: VP-50 deployed to MCAS Iwakuni, Japan. The aircraft designated by the squadron as "Seven Madness" was forced down with a burning port engine while returning from a routine patrol in the Yellow Sea. It was ditched safely and the crew was rescued. However, the seaplane sank while under tow.
- 1 June 1956: VP-50 became the last active duty Navy patrol squadron to replace its PBM Mariners with the new P5M-2 Marlin seaplane. Upon completion of the transition, the squadron's permanent home port was changed from NAS North Island, California, to NAS Whidbey Island, Washington.
- 25 September 1959: a United States Navy Martin P5M-2 Marlin (BuNo 135540, SG tailcode, '6', of VP-50) was patrolling out of NAS Whidbey Island when it was forced to ditch in the Pacific Ocean, about 100 miles west of the Washington-Oregon border. A Mark 90 depth charge casing was lost and never recovered, but it was not fitted with an active warhead. The ten crew members were rescued by the US Coast Guard, after ten hours in a raft. The press was not notified at the time.
- 1 April 1960: VP-50 was given a new home port at MCAS Iwakuni, Japan, under the operational and administrative control of FAW-6.
- 1 October 1961: VPs 50, 4, 28 and 40 were assigned to Task Force 72, U.S. Taiwan Patrol Force, keeping watch over international waters bordering communist territory from Siberia to North Vietnam. This action was in response and result of the Berlin Crisis. Units of the Naval Air Reserve, including five patrol and 13 carrier antisubmarine squadrons were called to active duty.
- 30 June–6 August 1964: VP-50 received a permanent change of station relocating its home port from MCAS Iwakuni, Japan, to Naval Air Station North Island, San Diego. The squadron was the last of five overseas patrol squadrons to return to home ports in the continental U.S. The squadron's 12 SP-5B Marlins were turned over to the Bureau of Weapons for storage at Iwakuni. Upon arrival at NAS North Island, VP-50 accepted 12 similar aircraft from VP-47, becoming fully operational on 6 August 1964.
- 26 August 1965: VP-50 deployed to NAS Sangley Point, with a detachment at Buckner Bay, Okinawa, and Cam Ranh Bay, Vietnam. Tender support at Buckner Bay was provided by USS Salisbury Sound, and at Cam Ranh Bay by USS Pine Island. The squadron flew 162 Operation Market Time missions and its aircraft were hit by ground fire on 10 occasions.
- 23 August 1966: VP-50 deployed to NAS Sangley Point with FAW-10. During the deployment a detachment operated out of Cam Ranh Bay, RVN, supported by the tender USS Currituck. On 6 January 1967, aircraft SG-13, while on a training flight, crashed in the South China Sea 20 miles west of Corregidor killing all 10 men aboard. Cause of the accident could not be determined.
- 1 July 1967: VP-50's home port was changed from NAS North Island, to NAS Moffett Field, California. And the squadron began the transition from the P5M-2 Marlin seaplane to the P-3A Orion landplane.
- 6 November 1967, a SP-5B of VP-50 took off from San Diego Bay, being the last United States Navy seaplane flight.
- 1 May 1968: VP-50 deployed to NAS Sangley Point, with a detachment at NAF Cam Ranh Bay, Vietnam. The squadron was the first P-3 Orion unit to operate from the Cam Ranh Bay facility and earned a Meritorious Unit Commendation for the performance of its duties during this period.
- 11 June–August 1979: VP-50 deployed to NAF Kadena, Okinawa, relieving VP-47. During August, numerous missions were flown in support of the Vietnamese refugees, infrared turret under the chin and Harpoon air-to-surface missile capability. The squadron became fully operational with the new updates during its first ready alert on 1 March 1988.
- 17 April 1980: A squadron P-3C, BuNo. 158213, SG-03, crashed on Pago Pago. After dropping six paratroopers as part of a Samoan Flag Day celebration, the pilot purposely flew the aircraft underneath the well-briefed tramway cable despite being directly told the P-3 was not to be part of the air-show. The cable was too hard to see, the flight path was misjudged at speed, and the aircraft vertical tail was sheared completely off the aircraft before it banked and crashed as it rolled and dove into the parking lot of the Rainmaker Hotel. Six crewmen were killed in the mishap as well as one civilian on the ground at the hotel. It is a fact well documented in the accident report that the PIC Allen Glenny boasted of what he was going to do the night before the air-show for a hot-dogging display, and the crash was blamed on pilot error. The CO was subsequently relieved of his command after the results of the accident investigation. These crew members lost their lives: LT Allen R. Glenny, LTJG P. Conroy, AW1 Steve R. Buchanan, AMS1 N.L. Scates, AO1 J.H. Sharp and AT2 T.J. Delviscio.
- 10 December 1983: VP-50 deployed to NAF Misawa, Japan, with a detachment at Naval Air Facility Adak, Alaska, relieving VP-40. During the deployment the squadron conducted numerous peacetime aerial reconnaissance program flights monitoring the transit of Soviet military vessels.
- 1986: VP-50 upgraded its P-3C baseline with the P-3C MOD avionics package, including new acoustic processors, long-range navigation gear, secure communications enhancements and Harpoon missile capability.
- 3 January 1987: VP-50 deployed to NAF Kadena, with a detachment at Diego Garcia. On 10 January the Kadena detachment repositioned to Diego Garcia where operations were focused on the gulf, North Arabian Sea and Indian Ocean. Detachments were established at intervals at Masirah Island, Oman.
- 22 June 1987: The squadron's first P-3C MOD aircraft was accepted for P-3C Update III retrofit program. The aircraft had an entirely new underwater acoustic monitoring system, doubling the number of sonobuoys that could be monitored concurrently over earlier systems. IBM signal processors provided a fourfold gain in isolating sounds of submerged targets from ocean background noise. Improvements in avionics, computers (AN/AYA-8) and cooling systems were added.
- 6 February 1988: a P-3C was damaged during a touch-and-go landing in an area where the runway was under construction. The pilot was able to make a wheels-up landing with three engines at nearby Cecil Field with no injury to any of the five crew aboard.
- 4 August 1988: VP-50 deployed to NAF Misawa, Japan. During the deployment the squadron was able to conduct several Pony Express operations (missile shot surveillance) on the People's Republic of China.
- 1 November 1989: VP-50 deployed to NAS Cubi Point, Philippines, with a detachment at NAF Diego Garcia. In December 1989 Philippine insurgents attempted a coup. VP-50 flew battle group support missions to cut off the potential supply lines for the rebels.
- 21 March 1991: Two VP-50 Orions, P-3C, BuNos. 158930 and 159325, had a midair collision off the southern coast of California, killing all 27 aircrewmen aboard. The cause for the mishap could not be determined.
- 30 June 1992: VP-50 was disestablished at NAS Moffett Field, Calif.

== Home port assignments ==
The squadron was assigned to these home ports, effective on the dates shown:

- NAS Sand Point, Washington 18 July 1946
- NAS San Diego/NAS North Island, California 4 August 1950
- NAS Whidbey Island, Washington 1 June 1956
- MCAS Iwakuni, Japan 1 April 1960
- NAS North Island, 30 June 1964
- NAS Moffett Field, California 1 July 1967

== Aircraft assignment ==
The squadron first received the following aircraft on the dates shown:

- PBY-5A/6A July 1946
- PV-2 July 1946
- PBM-5 1949
- PBM-5S/S2 August 1951
- P5M-2 June 1956
- SP-5B December 1962
- P-3A July 1967
- P-3B 1970
- P-3C 1971
- P-3C MOD 1986
- P-3C UIIIR June 1987

== See also ==
- History of the United States Navy
- List of inactive United States Navy aircraft squadrons
- List of squadrons in the Dictionary of American Naval Aviation Squadrons
- List of United States Navy aircraft squadrons
- Maritime patrol aircraft
