= USS Puget Sound =

USS Puget Sound has been the name of more than one ship of the United States Navy. These ships are named after Puget Sound in the state of Washington.

- USS Salisbury Sound, a Currituck-class seaplane tender, was originally to be named Puget Sound; however it was renamed prior to launching in 1944.
- The first commissioned USS Puget Sound (CVE-113) was an escort carrier in service for somewhat over a year, in 1945 and 1946.
- The second USS Puget Sound (AD-38) was a destroyer tender in service from 1968 to 1996.
