= Salisbury Sound =

Sound in Southeast Alaska

Coordinates: 57°21′38″N 135°46′52″W

Salisbury Sound is a sound between the north shore of Kruzof Island and the southwestern end of Chichagof Island in the Alexander Archipelago in Southeast Alaska. It is about 40 km (25 mi) northwest of the city of Sitka, and within the limits of Sitka City and Borough.

Salisbury Sound was named by Captain Nathaniel Portlock in 1787, in honor of Bishop Salisbury, even though Portlock did not ever see the sound itself. It was also named Puerto de los Remedios by Francisco Antonio Maurelle in 1775, Bay of Islands by Captain James Cook on 2 May 1778, Zund Klokacheva by navigator Ivan Vasiliev in 1809, and Protiv Olgi by Captain Tebenkov.

Salisbury Sound is the namesake of the seaplane tender USS Salisbury Sound.
