= Currituck-class seaplane tender =

US Navy ships (1943–1987)

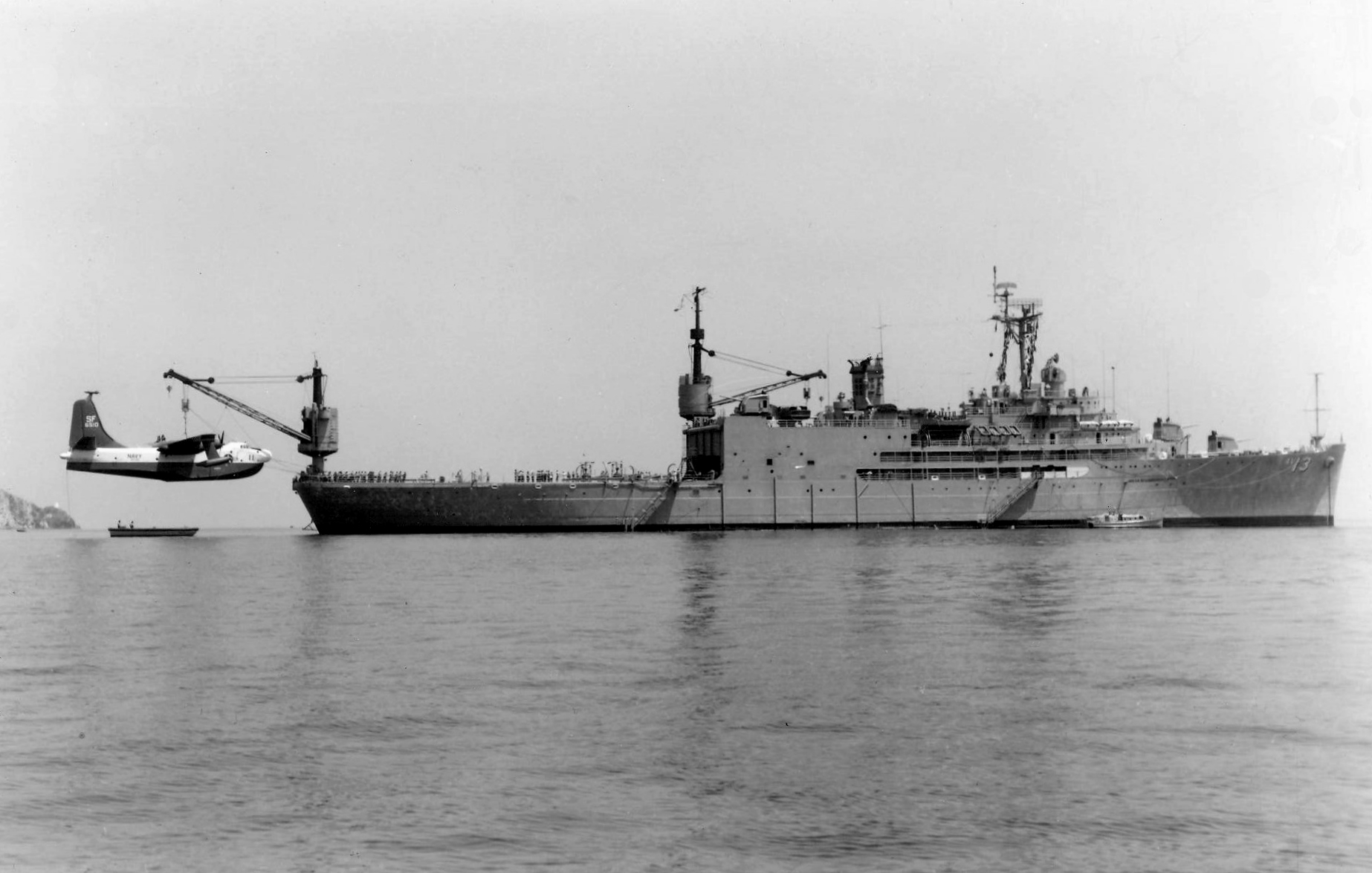
- USS Salisbury Sound at San Diego Bay, c. 1957

Class overview
- Name: Currituck class
- Builders: Philadelphia Naval Shipyard; Todd Shipyard
- Operators: United States Navy
- Built: 1942–1944
- In commission: 1943–1987
- Planned: 4
- Completed: 4
- Retired: 4

General characteristics as built
- Type: Seaplane tender
- Displacement: 15,092 long tons (15,334 t) (full load)
- Length: 540 ft 5 in (164.72 m) oa
- Beam: 69 ft 3 in (21.11 m)
- Draft: 22 ft 3 in (6.78 m)
- Propulsion: Steam turbines; 4 × boilers; 2 × shafts; 12,000 shp (8,900 kW)
- Speed: 18 knots (33 km/h; 21 mph)
- Complement: 1,247
- Armament: 4 × 5 in (127 mm)/38 cal. DP guns; 3 × quad 1.6 in (40 mm) guns; 4 × twin 1.6 in guns
- Aviation facilities: Hangar and catapult

The Currituck-class seaplane tenders were four ships built for the United States Navy during World War II. The role of a seaplane tender was to provide base facilities for squadrons of seaplanes in a similar way that an aircraft carrier does for its squadrons. While three members of the class were removed from active service in the 1960s, Norton Sound was modified to serve as a testbed for advanced radar and combat management systems, such as the Aegis Combat System.

== Design and description ==
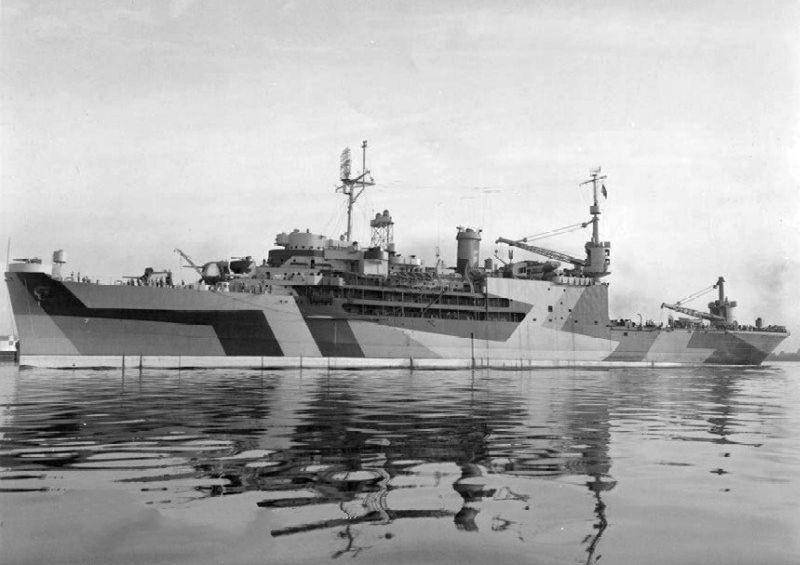
Currituck in 1944

In the interwar period, the United States Navy sought to find a cheaper alternative to the construction of airstrips on land for its air fleet. The distances required for air support, primarily in the Pacific Theater, were long and interwar naval treaties limited the size of aircraft carriers. The seaplane carrier was developed during interwar planning, with two versions being designed for use. The first design, designated AV, operated two full squadrons of patrol aircraft, provided quarters for the aircrew and repair functions. The second, designated AVP, was smaller, only capable of operating one squadron and was intended for use in shallow harbors due to their shallower draft. The Currituck class were of the first design and were also well armed as the ships were expected to provide shore defence too. The primary role of the Currituck class was reconnaissance as their mobility gave them an advantage of land-based aircraft. They also had a secondary role of bombing and torpedo attacks.

As the designs developed, alternative uses for the Currituck class was envisaged, with the United States Marine Corps planning to use them for advanced base operations, flying Marine Corps dive bomber aircraft and another one saw the ships used to transport aircraft to the front lines. Both of these were rejected, with escort carriers considered a more adequate ship type for the second role. During World War II, the Currituck class were used as conventional seaplane tenders.

The Currituck-class ships measured 540 feet 5 inches (164.72 m) long overall and 520 ft (160 m) at the waterline with a beam of 69 ft 3 in (21.11 m) and a maximum draft of 22 ft 3 in (6.78 m). The Curritucks had a trial displacement of 14,000 long tons (14,000 t) and a full load displacement of 15,092 long tons (15,334 t). (Note: Jane's Fighting Ships of World War II has the standard displacement as 9,090 long tons (9,240 t) and Blackman has it as 9,106 long tons (9,252 t).) The lead ship, Currituck, was powered by Parsons geared turbines, while the three others of the class were given Allis-Chalmers geared turbines. These were powered by steam created by four Babcock & Wilcox Express boilers turning two shafts creating 12,000 shaft horsepower (8,900 kW). This gave the seaplane tenders a maximum speed of 19.2 knots (35.6 km/h; 22.1 mph). (Note: Jane's Fighting Ships of World War II has the vessel's speed at just 18.5 knots (34.3 km/h; 21.3 mph).)

The vessels had a wartime complement of 1,247 including 162 officers. During peacetime, the ship's had a complement of 553 including 30 officers. The vessels had a hangar for seaplanes and could operate up to two full squadrons. They also had a flush-decked catapult, that along with a larger hangar, resulted from those alternative uses put forth for the design. During World War II, the vessels were armed with four single-mounted 5-inch (127 mm)/38-caliber dual-purpose guns, three quad-mounted and four twin-mounted 1.6 in (40 mm) guns. The 1.6-inch guns were removed postwar. (Note: The 38 caliber denotes the length of the gun. This means that the length of the gun barrel is 38 times the bore diameter.)

== Ships in class ==
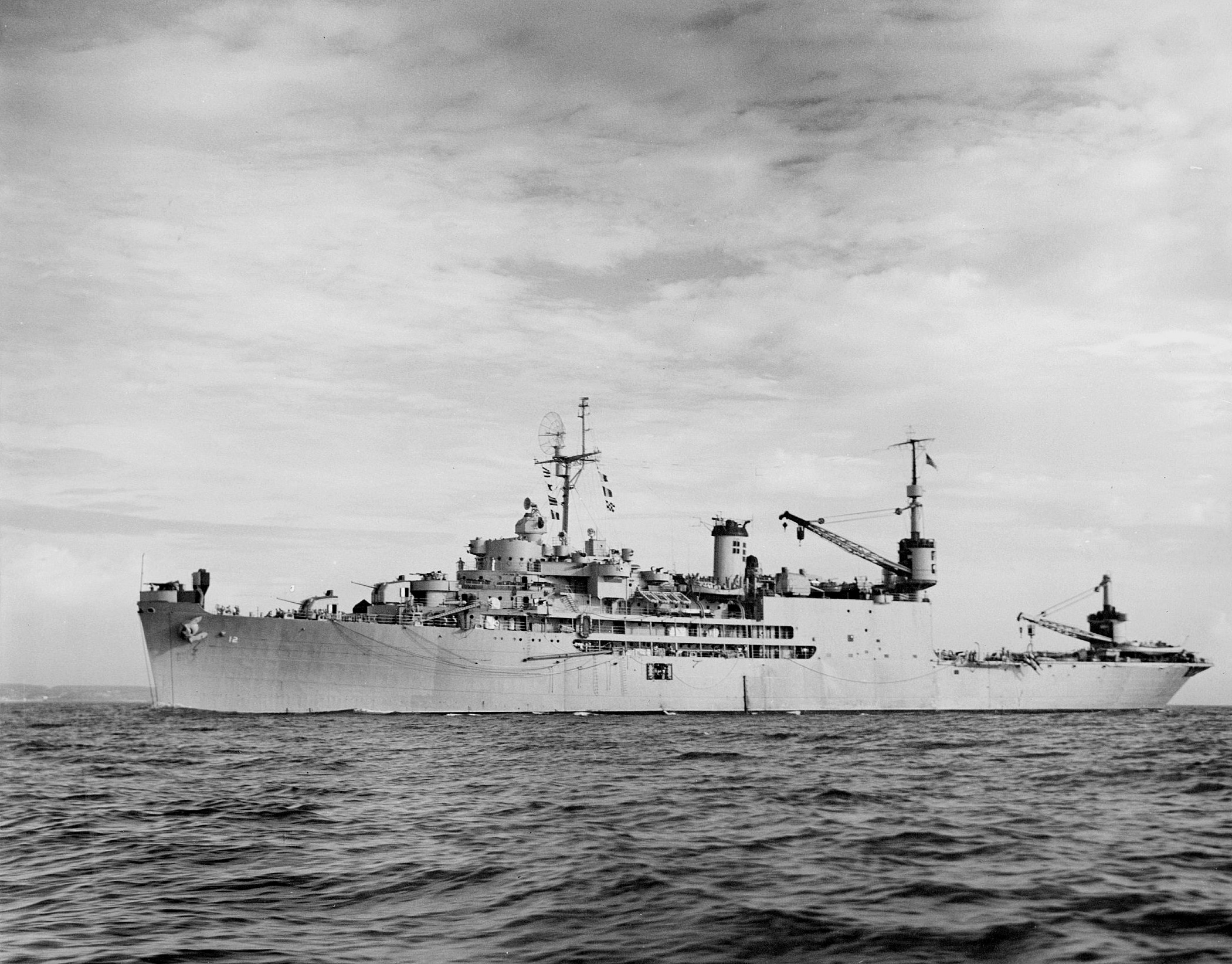
Pine Island in the late 1940s

Currituck class construction data
Hull number	Name	Builder	Laid down	Launched	Commissioned	Fate
AV-7	Currituck	Philadelphia Naval Shipyard, Philadelphia, Pennsylvania	—	11 September 1943	26 June 1944	Stricken 1 April 1971
AV-11	Norton Sound	Todd Shipyard, San Pedro, California	7 September 1942	28 November 1943	8 January 1945	Converted to guided missile trial ship (AVM-11) 1948
AV-12	Pine Island	Todd Shipyard, San Pedro, California	16 November 1942	26 February 1944	26 April 1945	Stricken 1 February 1971
AV-13	Salisbury Sound (ex-Puget Sound)	Todd Shipyard, San Pedro, California	10 April 1943	5 June 1944	26 November 1945	Sold 7 February 1972

== Construction and career ==
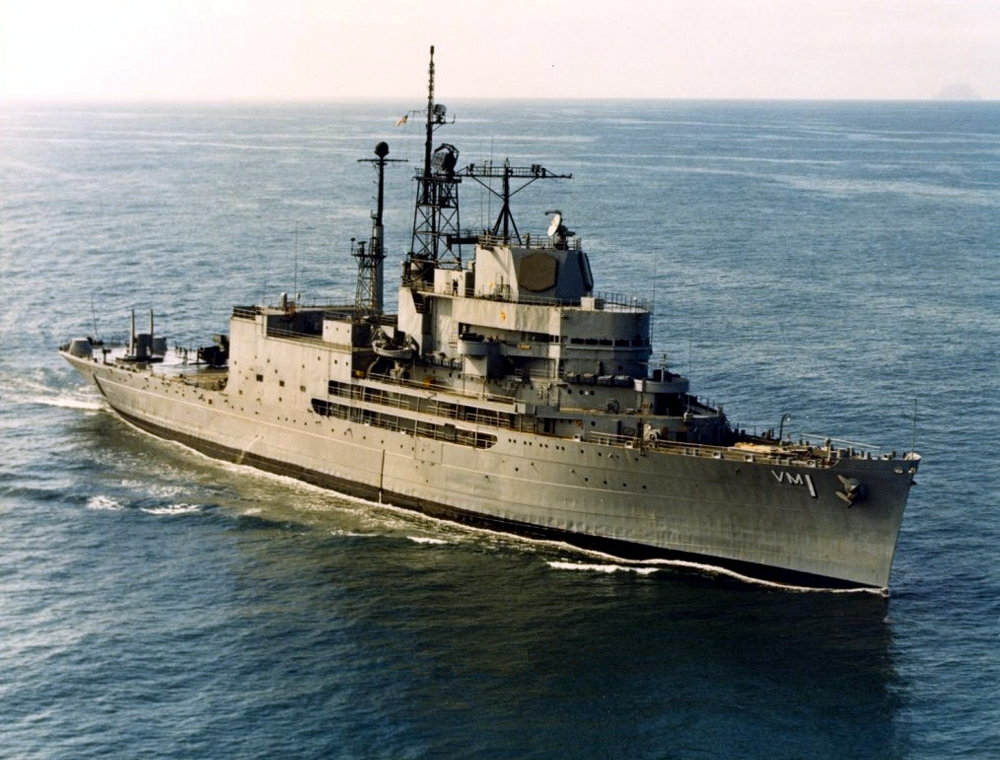
Norton Sound in 1980 after conversion to trial ship

The lead ship, Currituck, was constructed at the Philadelphia Navy Yard and entered service in 1944. The ship was modernized under the 1957 conversions program at the Philadelphia Naval Shipyard and re-entered service on 20 August 1960. The ship was taken out of service and assigned to the Maritime Administration Reserve Fleet in 1968 after the Martin P5M Marlin aircraft were retired from naval service. Norton Sound, Pine Island and Salisbury Sound were all built by Todd Shipyard on the west coast and entered service by mid-1945. In 1948 Norton Sound was selected to be converted to a guided missile trials ship. The ship had its two forward 5-inch guns removed and a helicopter platform installed and also had its stern crane removed. Norton Sound was assigned to the Operation Test and Evaluation Force. The vessel carried out tests with American versions of the German V-1 flying bomb and the US Navy's Aerobee rocket, the RIM-24 Tartar missile system and the RIM-50 Typhon missile system. In 1958 Norton Sound would be the launch platform for the Operation Argus nuclear tests in the south Atlantic. Pine Island and Salisbury Sound were placed in reserve in 1967. Currituck, Pine Island and Salisbury Sound were all stricken from the Naval Vessel Register in the 1970s.

== See also ==
- List of ship classes of the Second World War
