= USS Salisbury Sound =

Tender of the United States Navy

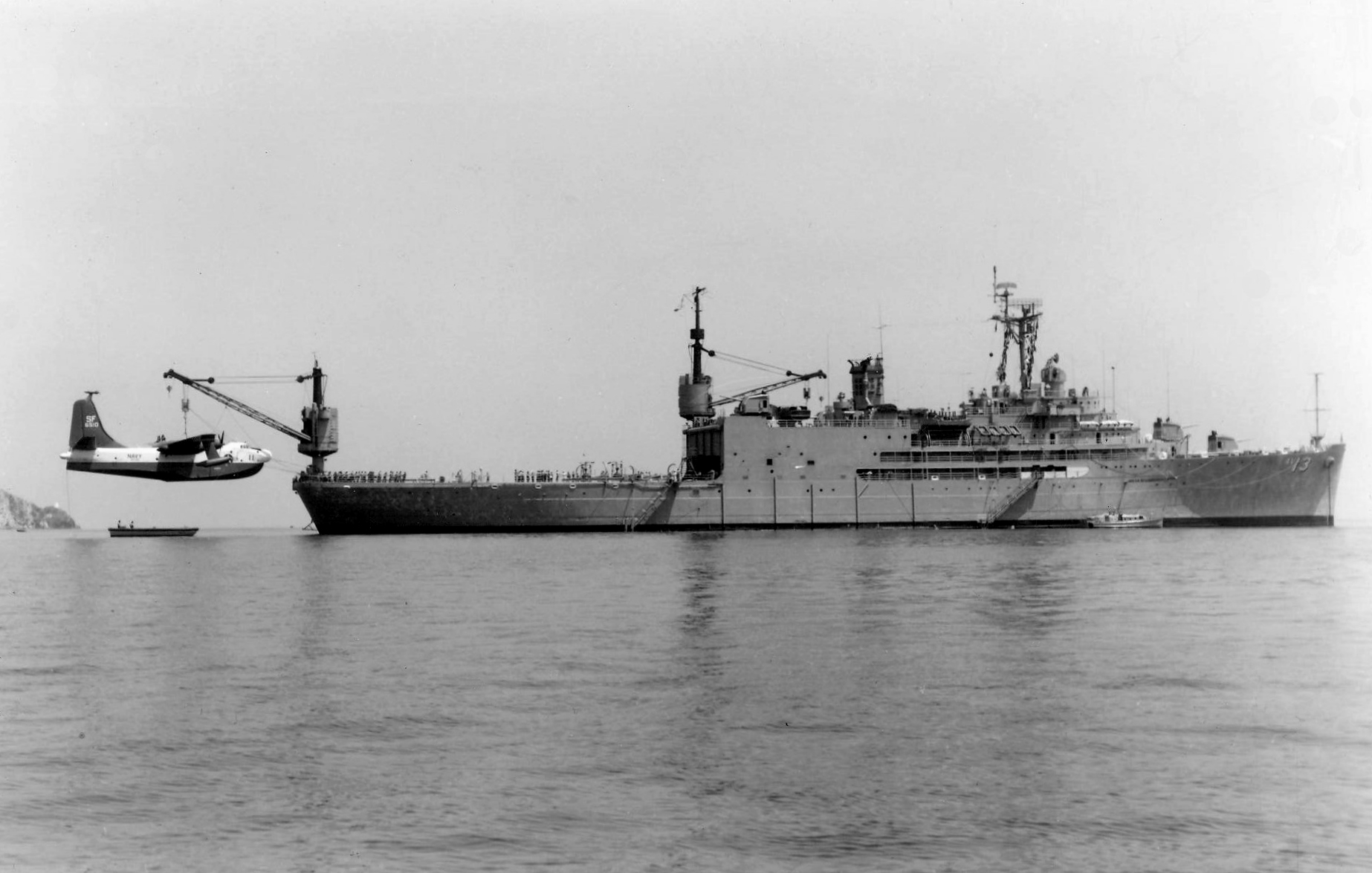
- USS Salisbury Sound (AV-13) at San Diego Bay, ca. 1957

History

United States
- Name: USS Salisbury Sound
- Namesake: Salisbury Sound
- Builder: Los Angeles Shipbuilding and Dry Dock Company, San Pedro, California
- Laid down: 10 April 1943
- Launched: 18 June 1944
- Commissioned: 26 November 1945
- Decommissioned: 31 March 1967
- Motto: Latin: Fortes fortuna juvat
- Fate: Sold, 7 February 1972

General characteristics
- Class & type: Currituck-class seaplane tender
- Displacement: 14,000 tons (full load)
- Length: 540 ft 5 in (164.72 m)
- Beam: 69 ft 3 in (21.11 m)
- Draft: 22 ft 3 in (6.78 m)
- Propulsion: Steam turbines; 4 × boilers; 2 × shafts; 12,000 shp (9.0 MW)
- Speed: 18 knots (33 km/h)
- Complement: 684
- Armament: 4 × 5"/38 DP guns; 3 × Quad 40 mm guns; 4 × Dual 40 mm guns; 20 × 20 mm guns

Service record
- Part of: United States Pacific Fleet (1945–1967); National Defense Reserve Fleet (1967–1972)
- Operations: Korean War; Vietnam War
- Awards: 4 Campaign stars (Vietnam)

USS Salisbury Sound (AV-13), a Currituck-class seaplane tender, was laid down on 10 April 1943 by Los Angeles Shipbuilding and Dry Dock Company, San Pedro, California. The ship was originally named Puget Sound, however it was renamed on 5 June 1944, before it was launched on 18 June 1944. Salisbury Sound was sponsored by Mrs. John D. Price, and commissioned on 26 November 1945. She was named after the Salisbury Sound; a sound near Sitka, Alaska and until her decommissioning was affectionately referred to by her crewmembers as the "Sally Sound" .

== History ==
After shakedown, Salisbury Sound departed San Diego on 12 February 1946 and commenced her first of 19 deployments to the western Pacific, where she served during a portion of every year from 1946 through 1966. The seaplane tender operated at Okinawa, Shanghai, and Qingdao from March through October 1946. From April into September 1947, she voyaged Okinawa, Qingdao, and Guam; and later, from May into September 1948, she sailed to Yokosuka, Qingdao, and Shanghai. Upon completion of several west coast operations in 1949, she steamed to Hong Kong later that year and returned to San Diego on 13 June 1950.

On 26 July 1950, soon after North Korean forces invaded South Korea, Salisbury Sound sailed from San Diego. After delivering cargo to Yokosuka and Okinawa, she tended planes at Iwakuni, Japan, and at Okinawa from September into December. Her planes performed reconnaissance work in the Korean area and in the Taiwan Strait. After returning to San Diego on 31 March 1951, she sailed on 1 August, and served at Boko Ko in the Pescadores Islands, at Okinawa, and at Iwakuni, before returning to San Diego on 16 April 1952. Departing Long Beach on 15 August, she again tended planes at Okinawa, before arriving at Alameda, California, on 25 March 1953.

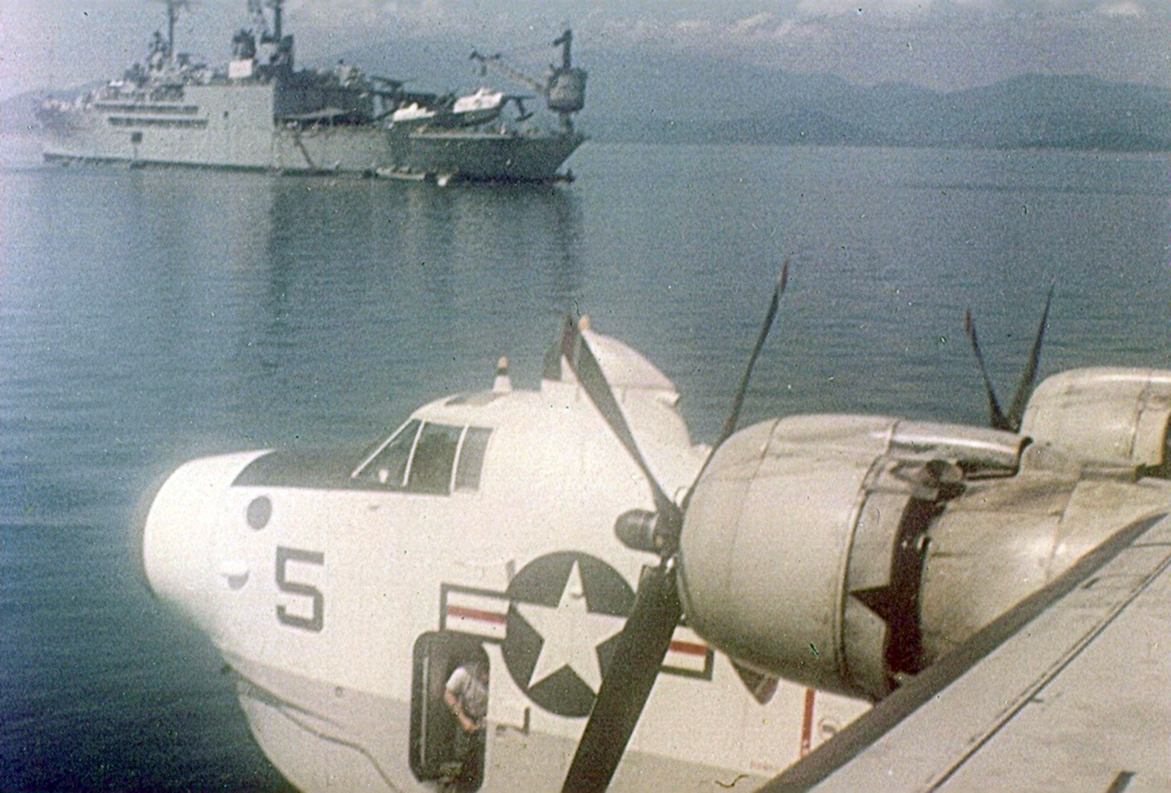
USS Salisbury Sound (AV-13) with VP-40 Marlins at Cam Ranh Bay 1966

From 1954 through 1966, Salisbury Sound operated frequently at Okinawa, and also at Taiwan and Luzon. She served as flagship of the Formosa Patrol Force during the evacuation of the Tachen Islands in February 1955, and later as flagship of the Taiwan Patrol Force. Effective 1 August 1963, her homeport was changed from Alameda Naval Air Station, California, to NAS Whidbey Island, Washington at the seaplane base where she carried and tended to the P5M Marlin. Voyaging to Vietnam, she visited Saigon in the spring of 1959. She steamed to Da Nang, Côn Sơn Island, and Chàm Islands in 1965, and to Cam Ranh Bay in 1966. She also participated in Operation Market Time.

Decommissioned on 31 March 1967, the "Sally Sound" was transferred to the Maritime Administration on 3 July 1968 and entered the National Defense Reserve Fleet, Olympia, Washington, where she remained until sold to Zidell Explorations, Inc., of Portland, Oregon, on 7 February 1972.

The vessel's commissioning plaque was saved and is currently on board the museum ship USS Hazard in Omaha, NE.

Salisbury Sound received four campaign stars for service in Vietnam.

== See also ==
- USS Puget Sound for other ships of the same name.
