= USS Pine Island =

Tender of the United States Navy

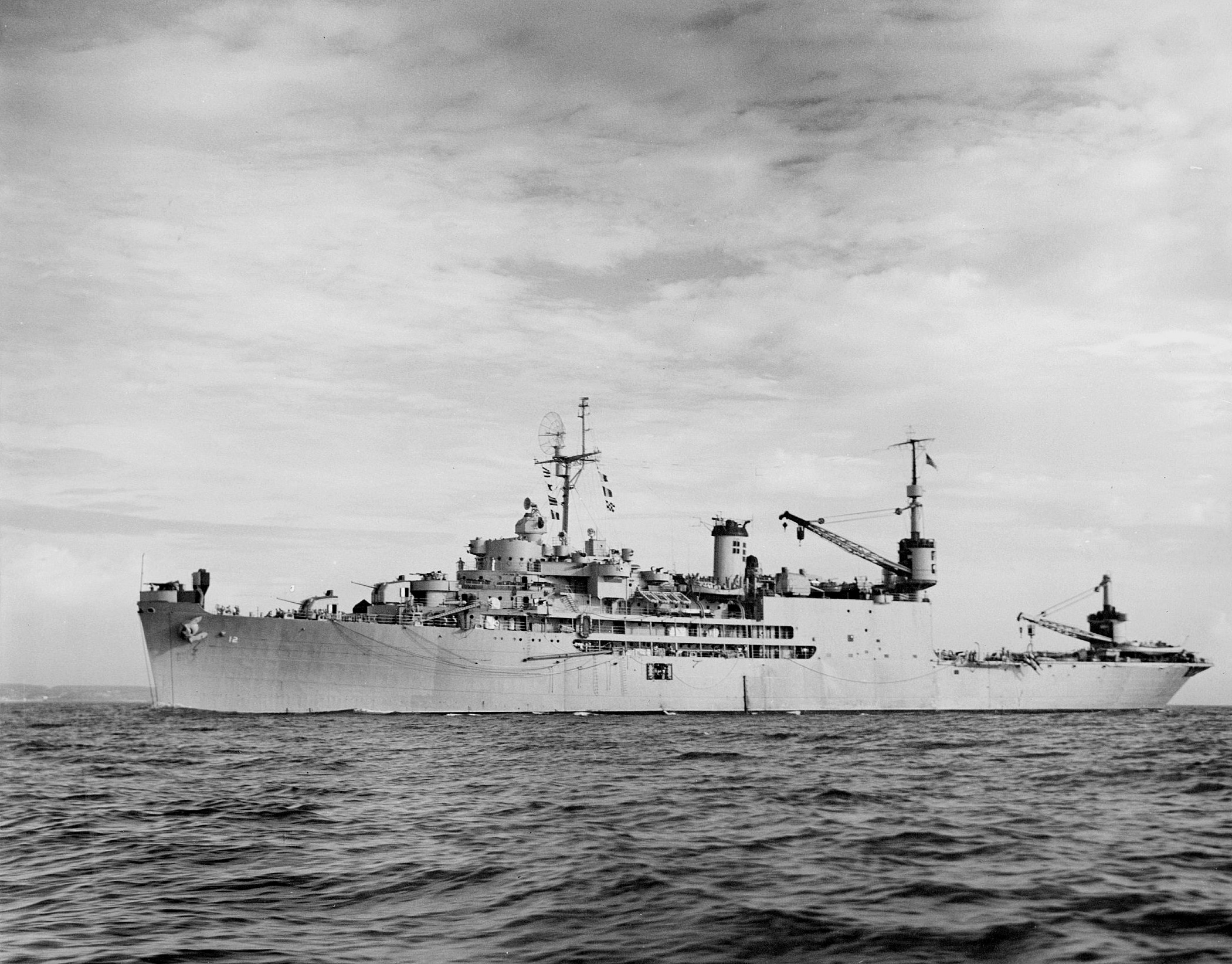
- USS Pine Island (AV-12)

History

United States
- Name: USS Pine Island
- Namesake: Pine Island Sound in Florida (not the island itself) The four ships in this class were Currituck Sound; Norton Sound; Salisbury Sound and Pine Island Sound.
- Builder: Los Angeles Shipbuilding and Dry Dock Company, San Pedro, California
- Laid down: 16 November 1942
- Launched: 26 February 1944
- Commissioned: 26 April 1945
- Decommissioned: 1 May 1950
- Recommissioned: 7 October 1950
- Decommissioned: 16 June 1967
- Stricken: 1 February 1971
- Fate: Sold, 7 February 1972

General characteristics
- Class & type: Currituck-class seaplane tender
- Displacement: 14,000 tons (full load)
- Length: 540 ft 5 in (164.72 m)
- Beam: 69 ft 3 in (21.11 m)
- Draft: 22 ft 3 in (6.78 m)
- Propulsion: Steam turbines; 4 × boilers; 2 × shafts; 12,000 shp (9.0 MW)
- Speed: 18 knots (33 km/h)
- Complement: 684
- Armament: 4 × 5"/38 DP guns; 3 × Quad 40 mm guns; 4 × Dual 40 mm guns; 20 × 20 mm guns

Service record
- Part of: United States Pacific Fleet (1945–1967); National Defense Reserve Fleet (1967–1972)
- Operations: World War II; Korean War; Vietnam War
- Awards: 1 Battle star (WWII); Service medals (Korea & Vietnam)

USS Pine Island (AV-12), a Currituck-class seaplane tender, is the only ship of the United States Navy to hold this name. The ship was named after Pine Island Sound (off the coast of Lee County, Florida).

Pine Island was laid down on 16 November 1942 at the Los Angeles Shipbuilding and Dry Dock Company, San Pedro, California; launched on 26 February 1944, sponsored by Mrs. Knefler McGinnis; and commissioned on 26 April 1945.

== World War II ==
Departing California on 16 June 1945, Pine Island steamed to Okinawa. There she tended seaplanes engaged in air-sea rescue operations during the final phases of World War II. At the end of the war, she entered Tokyo Bay and contributed seaplane flight operations to the occupation of Japan in 1945. Following occupation duty in Japan, she conducted seaplane flight operations in the Huangpu River near Shanghai, China. She left the Pacific in 1946, and steamed via the Suez Canal to Norfolk, Virginia.

== Operation Highjump ==
Departing Norfolk on 4 December, she crossed the Antarctic Circle on 25 December 1946. Carrying one Sikorsky HO3S-1 helicopter, one Curtiss SOC Seagull amphibian, and tending three Martin PBM-5 Mariner flying boats; she contributed to the aerial exploration of Antarctica in Operation Highjump, and saved several downed aviators from the hostile climate. In addition a bay in Antarctica, Pine Island Bay, was named in honor of the ship. A glacier on Thurston Island was also named after the ship. Departing the Antarctic in March, she traveled from Rio de Janeiro via the Panama Canal to San Diego, California, arriving there in April 1947.

Leaving California for the Far East in August 1947, she spent the winter at Qingdao, China and the summer of 1948 in the Northern Pacific Ocean. Stored awaiting a major overhaul in 1949, she was decommissioned on 1 May 1950.

== Korean War ==
Recommissioned on 7 October 1950 at Alameda, California, in response to the Korean War, she departed for the Western Pacific in December. She tended seaplanes that flew missions over enemy-held territory in Korea, before returning to San Diego in September 1951. She was away from California on WestPac deployments January to September 1952, February to September 1953, January to August 1954, and February to August 1955. Deployed to WestPac in June 1956, she visited Brunei, Borneo, in August, before returning to San Diego in December. From April to December 1957 she operated again in WestPac.

Sailing for WestPac in May 1958, she visited Bangkok, Thailand, and was at Kaohsiung, Taiwan, during the Second Taiwan Strait Crisis. She returned to San Diego in December, and departed for WestPac in June 1959. During 1960 and 1961 she continued her Pacific duties.

Deployed to WestPac from January to June 1962, she embarked news media personnel from several countries in March in connection with the SEATO exercise "Tulungan." Steaming for WestPac in March 1963, she operated out of Okinawa, received visitors at Chinhae, Korea, in June, and delivered fresh water to Hong Kong in August, before returning to San Diego in September. In January 1964 she departed San Diego for the Galapagos Islands, where she provided assistance to scientists before returning to San Diego in February.

== Vietnam War ==
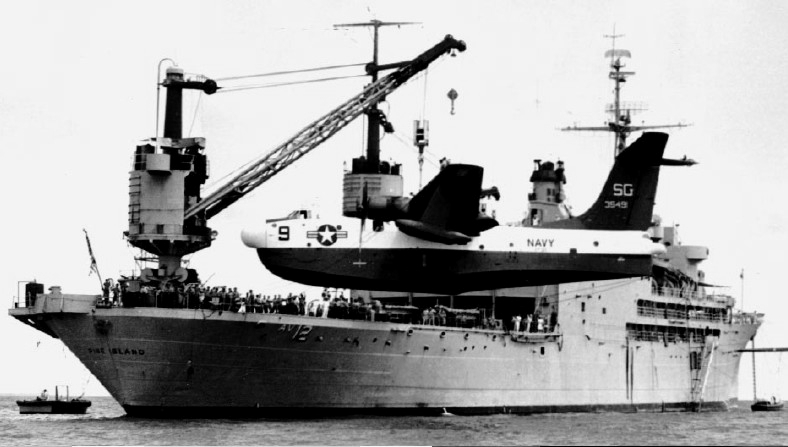
USS Pine Island (AV-12) with SP-5B Cam Ranh Bay 1965

Deployed to WestPac in June 1964, she served at Da Nang, South Vietnam, in August. In September 1965, she returned to WestPac, conducted seaplane operations in Cam Ranh Bay, South Vietnam, and participated in the 1966 Coral Sea anniversary festivities in Australia and New Zealand before returning to San Diego in June. She also took part in Operation Market Time.

Decommissioned in Puget Sound Naval Shipyard on 16 June 1967, Pine Island entered the Maritime Administration's National Defense Reserve Fleet, at Suisun Bay, CA, where she remained until stricken on 1 February 1971, and was later sold to Zidell Exploration of Portland, Oregon on 7 March 1972.

== Awards ==
- Asiatic-Pacific Campaign Medal with one battle star
- World War II Victory Medal
- Navy Occupation Medal with "ASIA" clasp
- China Service Medal
- National Defense Service Medal with star
- Korean Service Medal
- Vietnam Service Medal, several periods between 10-Oct-1965 and 11-APR-1966
- Antarctic Service Medal, 24-Dec-1946 to 10-Mar-1947
- United Nations Korea Medal
- Republic of Vietnam Meritorious Unit Citation (Gallantry Cross Medal Color with Palm) 02-Apr-1966 to 11-Apr-1966
- Armed Forces Expeditionary Medal for Taiwan Straits and Vietnam
