= Martin P5M Marlin =

US Navy/Coast Guard patrol seaplane (1952–1967)

P5M/P-5 Marlin
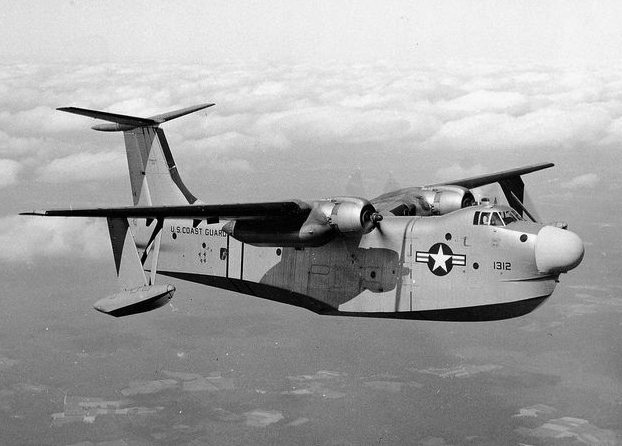
- U.S. Coast Guard Martin P5M-2G Marlin

General information
- Type: Patrol aircraft
- Manufacturer: Glenn L. Martin Company
- Status: Retired
- Primary users: United States Navy United States Coast Guard; French Navy
- Number built: 285

History
- Introduction date: 1952
- First flight: 30 May 1948
- Retired: 1967
- Developed from: Martin PBM Mariner

The Martin P5M Marlin (P-5 Marlin after 1962) is a twin-engined maritime patrol flying boat designed and built by the American aircraft manufacturer Glenn L. Martin Company. It would be the final flying boat to be operated by the United States Navy (US Navy).

Derived from the successful World War II-era flying boat, the Martin PBM Mariner, the Marlin was developed during the late 1940s. Power was provided by a pair of Wright R-3350 radial engines while a new hull design enabled safer operations from rough seas. On 30 May 1948, the XP5M-1 prototype performed its maiden flight. Three years later, the P5M-1 production flying boats entered service with the US Navy; the improved P5M-2 would also be procured by the service. The US Navy deployed the type to conduct maritime surveillance patrols during the Vietnam War before ultimately opting to withdraw the type during the late 1960s. Plans to use Marlins for air-sea rescue with the United States Coast Guard were mooted but ultimately not followed through, those flying boats that were delivered being solely used for training instead. The French Navy also opted to procure the type to replace its Short Sunderlands. Ultimately, 285 flying boats were produced.

== Design and development ==
The Marlin was developed during the late 1940s to be a primary element of the anti-submarine warfare activities of United States Navy (US Navy). It was derived from, and designed to be a successor to, the World War II-era Martin PBM Mariner flying boat; by the end of the conflict, the limited sensor capacity of the Mariner was becoming insufficient to address the future needs of maritime reconnaissance operations. In contrast to its predecessor, the Marlin was furnished with more powerful Wright R-3350-32WA Duplex-Cyclone radial engines, a more advanced hull design, and a single vertical fin tail configuration. For the anti-submarine mission envisioned for the type, the Marlin was equipped with a nose-mounted search radar as well as a tail-mounted magnetic anomaly detector.

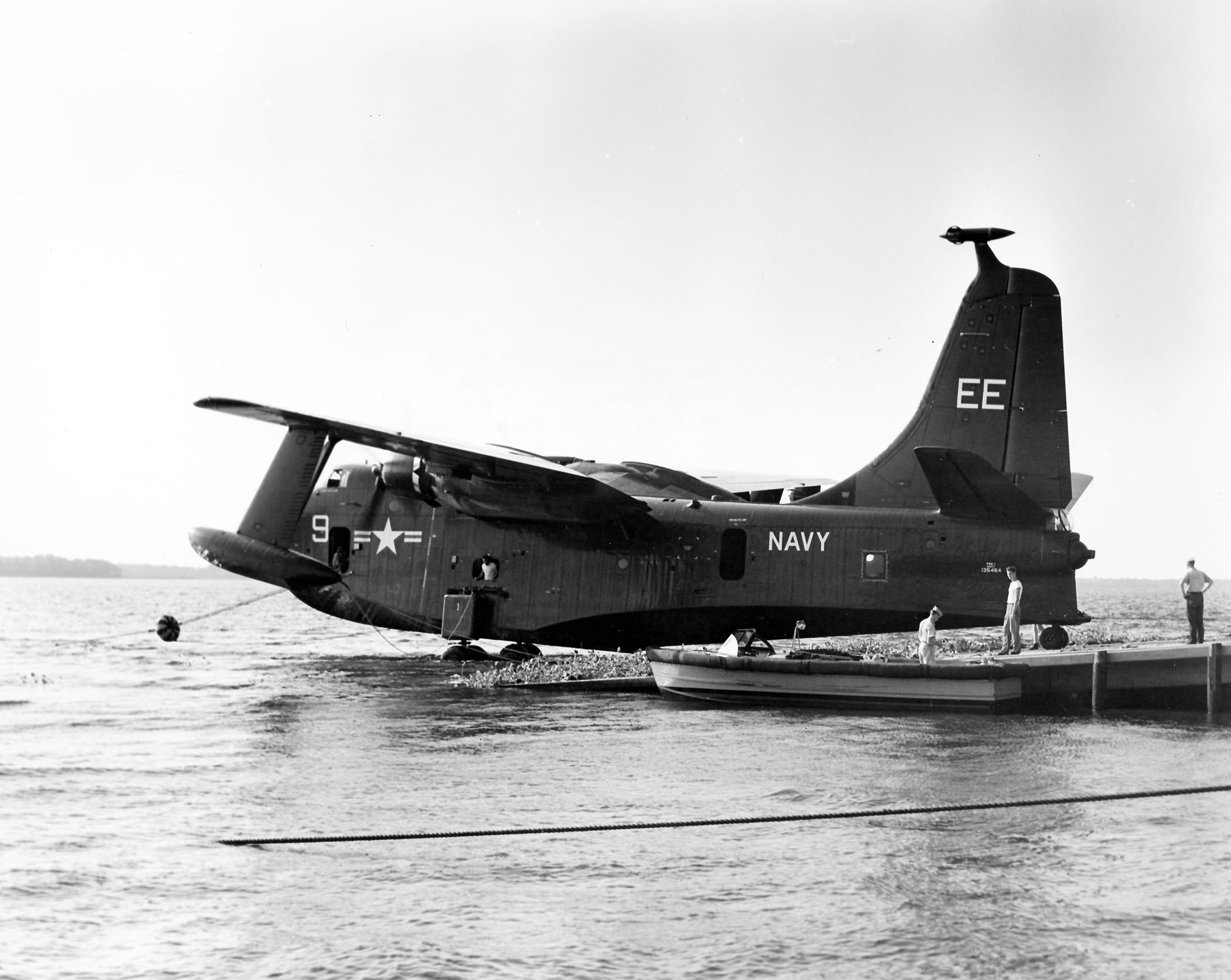
P5M-1 of VP-45 in 1954

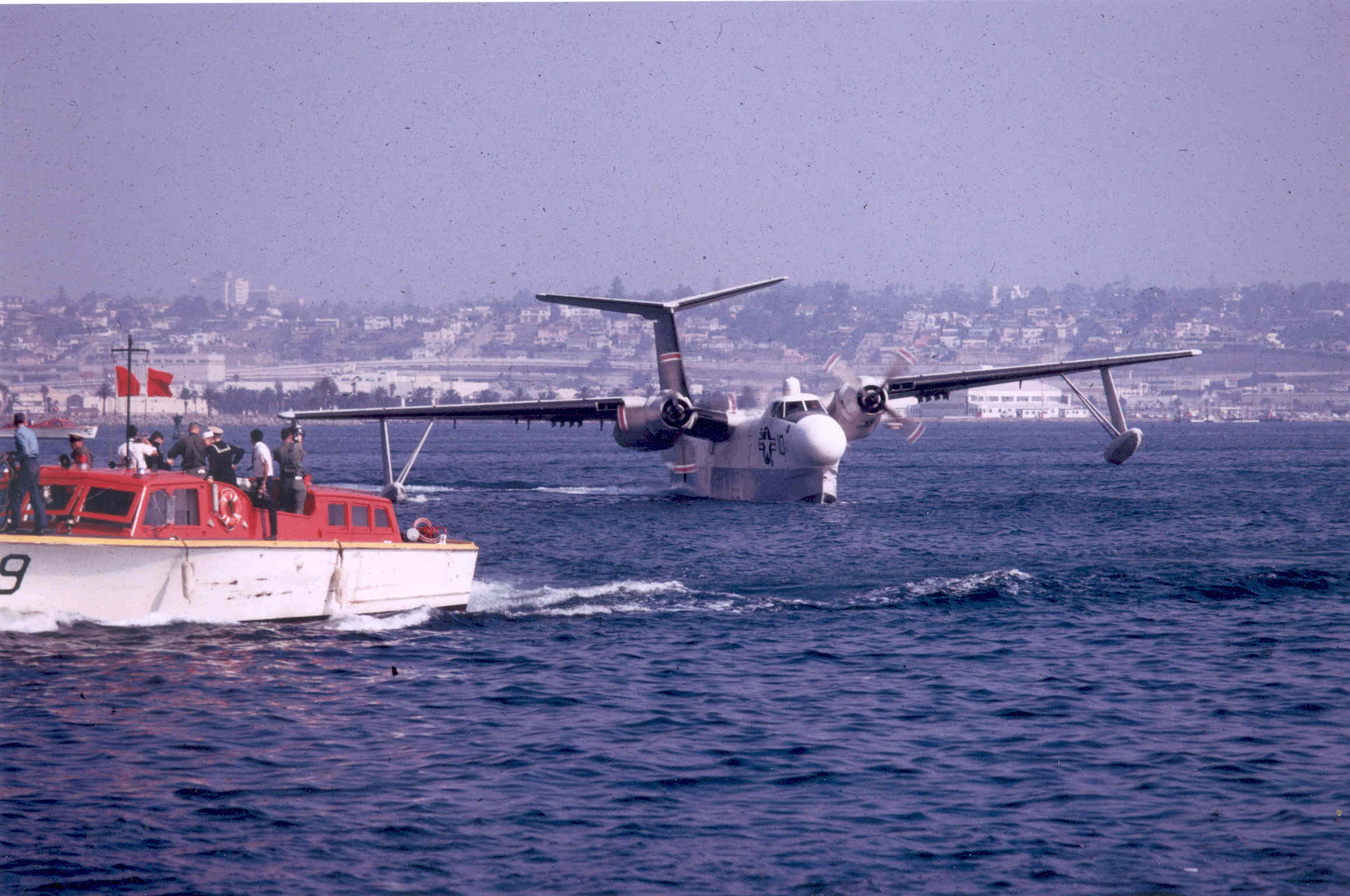
A VP-40 SP-5B after the last operational U.S. Navy flight of a Marlin in 1967

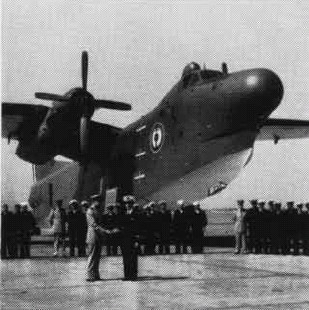
A French P5M-2 in 1957

In contrast to the majority of contemporary flying boats, the rear hull did not lift sharply from the water at the tail, but instead rose up steadily; this design feature, which was designed by the company, gave the flying boat a longer base of flotation and reduced "porpoising" over waves, permitting safer landings in rough seas as well as reducing the take-off distance required. The hull was internally divided into three watertight compartments.

The Marlin featured a gull wing, which placed both the engines and their propellers high above the sea spray. To augment the flying boat's twin engines during takeoff runs, it could be outfitted with jet-assisted take-off (JATO) bottles on each side of the hull. While the Marlin could maintain flight on a single engine, pilots were required to take immediate action in the event of an engine outage, which included the dumping of any expendable equipment and fuel. Despite the presence of anti-icing apparatus, the flying boat reportedly remained vulnerable to heavy icing conditions. When required, a set of wheels could be fitted to the hull by the crew to act as berthing gear.

The primary armaments of the Marlin comprised depth charges and homing torpedoes. These weapons were accommodated with the flying boat's two bomb bays, these being embedded into the engine nacelles and could collectively hold up to 8,000 lb of munitions. During the late 1950s, the type would also be armed with high-velocity rockets; carried upon underwing pylons, these were intended for use against surface targets, often with the intent of suppressing enemy anti-aircraft fire during bombing or torpedo runs. The Marlin could also deploy sonobuoys and receive sensor information via radio for its sensor operators.

Typically, the Marlin was operated by 11 personnel, these being a pair of pilots, a pilot-navigator, a radar operator, an ordnanceman, an airplane captain and their assistant, a radio operator, a pair of acoustic sensor operators, and an observer. The latter position, located to the aft, was normally provisioned with a suite of cameras, including a gyro-stabilized model. Various amenities were incorporated for crew comfort, including multiple bunk beds, a head, and a compact galley.

The XP5M prototypes for the Marlin were based on the last PBM-5 Mariners, its internal designation being Model 237. The prototype XP5M-1 was equipped with both nose and tail turrets with twin 20 mm (0.79 in) cannon in each, as well as a dorsal turret with armed with a pair of 0.5 in (12.7 mm) M2 Browning machine guns. The cockpit area was identical to that of the Mariner's. It performed its maiden flight on 30 May 1948.

The first of 167 production P5M-1 flying boats was produced in 1951, flying on 22 June 1951. Changes from the prototype included a raised flight deck for improved visibility, the replacement of the nose turret with a large radome for the AN/APS-44 search radar, the deletion of the dorsal turret, and new, streamlined wing floats. The engine nacelles were lengthened to provide room for weapons bays in the rear.

The P5M-1 was followed by 116 P5M-2 flying boats. These differed by having a T-tail that kept the tail surfaces out of the sea spray, an AN/ASQ-8 MAD boom at the rear of the tail-tip, no tail guns (the gun position have been replaced by the antenna for the AN/APN-122 Doppler Navigation Set), better crew accommodation, and an improved bow to reduce spray during takeoff and landing.

== Operational history ==
=== U.S. Navy ===
Numerous Marlins were deployed during the Cuban Missile Crisis, where the type shadowed Soviet freighters travelling to and from the island. While the type was routinely deployed on maritime reconnaissance missions, tracking Soviet shipping around the globe, it rarely picked up their submarines. Over time, the US Navy's land-based assets, such as the Lockheed P-2 Neptune and the Lockheed P-3 Orion, could travel faster, fly further, and haul greater payloads.

The last flying boat operations of the United States Navy were Operation Market Time patrols by Patrol Squadron 40 (VP-40) during the Vietnam War. Maritime surveillance patrols began in February 1965 to locate small craft transporting supplies from North Vietnam to Viet Cong units in South Vietnam. VP-40 operated from seaplane tenders and patrolled off the Mekong Delta between Phú Quốc and Vung Tau.

VP-40 carried out the final U.S. Navy Marlin flight, which landed on San Diego Bay in California on 6 November 1967.

The last U.S. Navy P5M, redesignated an SP-5B in 1962, was flown to Naval Air Station Patuxent River, Maryland, on 12 July 1968 for interim storage pending construction of a display area for it at the Smithsonian Institution in Washington, D.C. As a display area at the Smithsonian did not materialize, the aircraft later was moved to the National Naval Aviation Museum at Naval Air Station Pensacola, Florida, where it was on display as of 2010.

=== U.S. Coast Guard ===
Seven P5M-1Gs and four P5M-2Gs were built for the United States Coast Guard (USCG) for air-sea rescue service, but the service found the flying boat difficult to maintain and surplus to requirements. They were subsequently transferred to the US Navy, which redesignated them TP-5As and used them as training aircraft because they had no provision for armament.

=== French Navy ===
The French Navy took delivery of ten former US Navy Marlins between 1957 and 1959 to replace Short Sunderlands in maritime patrol service. They were based at Dakar, Senegal, in West Africa. They were returned to the US Navy in 1964.

== Variants ==
=== Company designations ===
M-237
Company designation for P5M-1
M-237B
Company designation for P5M-2
M-270
XP5M-1 prototype converted with a revised hull.
M-290
Company designation for P5M-3 which was completely revised into the unbuilt four-engine P7M SubMaster

=== Pre-1962 designations ===
XP5M-1
Prototype converted from a PBM Mariner with modified hull and tail.
P5M-1
Production model for the United States Navy, 160 built, later redesignated P-5A.
P5M-1G
Modified P5M-1 for the United States Coast Guard, seven conversions, later returned to the Navy as P5M-1T.
P5M-1S
Modified P5M-1 with upgraded electronic and anti-submarine equipment, eighty conversions, later redesignated SP-5A.
P5M-1T
Seven former USCG P5M-1Gs returned to Navy as crew trainers and one former P5M-1, later redesignated TP-5A.
P5M-2
Updated model, 108 built for the U.S. Navy and 12 built for the French Navy. The P5M-2 featured a T-tail in lieu of the low mounted horizontal stabilizer used on the P5M-1s. United States aircraft were later redesignated P-5B.
P5M-2S
Most P5M-2s were modified with upgraded electronic and anti-submarine equipment, later redesignated SP-5B.
P5M-2G
Four P5M-2s built for the USCG, later transferred to U.S. Navy as P5M-2s.
P5M-3
Completely revised as four-engine M-313 P7M-1 SubMaster. Mockup built in 1956 but lost to Lockheed P-3 Orion.

=== Post-1962 designations ===
P-5A
P5M-1 redesignated in 1962.
SP-5A
P5M-1S redesignated in 1962.
TP-5A
P5M-1T redesignated in 1962.
P-5B
P5M-2 redesignated in 1962.
SP-5B
P5M-2S redesignated in 1962.

== Operators ==
France

- French Navy

United States

- United States Coast Guard
- United States Navy

== Surviving aircraft ==
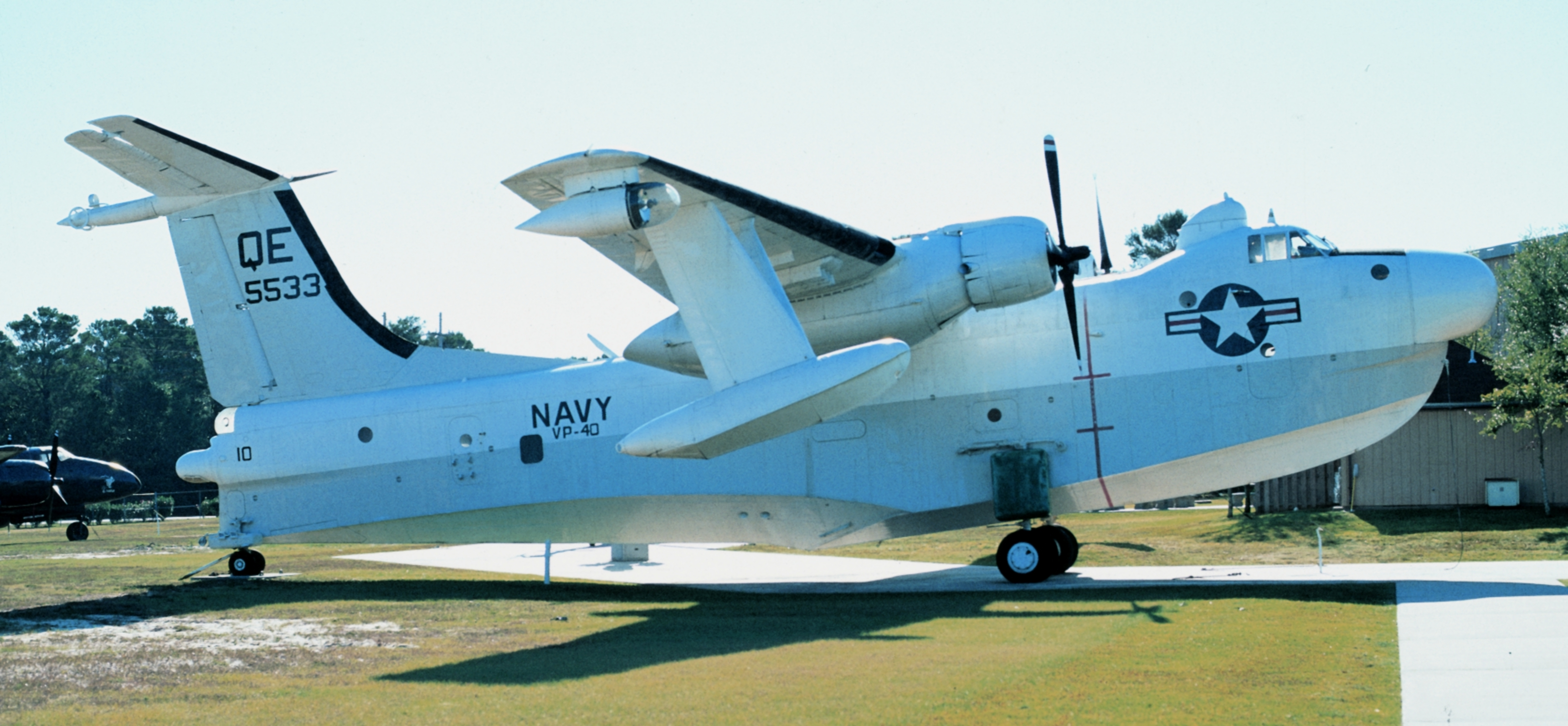
SP-5B at the Naval Aviation Museum in 1977

One SP-5B is located at the National Naval Aviation Museum at Naval Air Station Pensacola, Florida. This aircraft, BuNo 135533, is believed to be the last remaining example of the Marlin. It is now displayed inside the new hangar (as of the spring of 2010) and much of the exterior has been restored. The restoration is being financed by the museum and the Mariner/Marlin Association.

== Specifications (P5M-2) ==
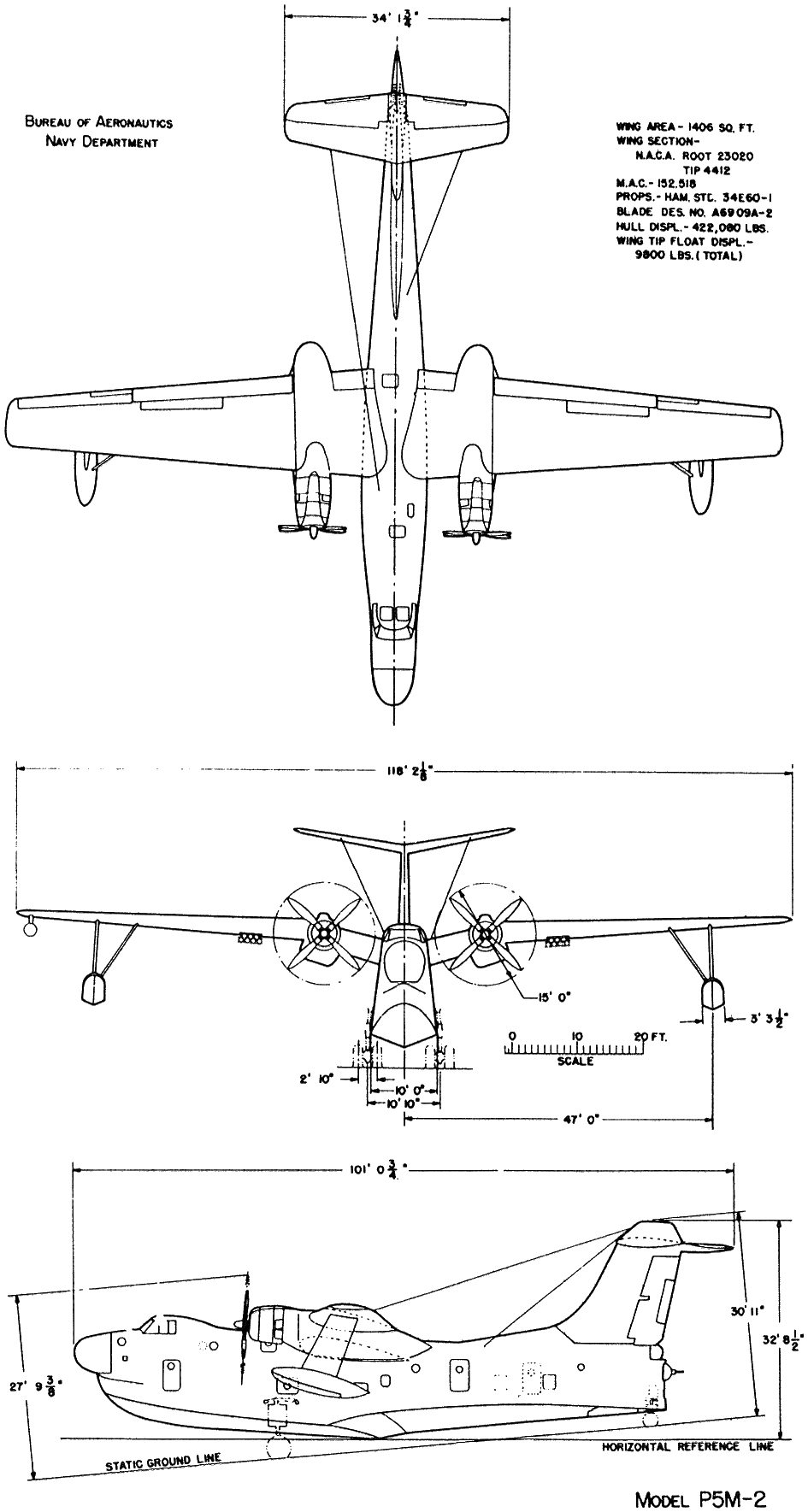
3-view line drawing of the Martin P5M-2 Marlin

Data from United States Navy aircraft since 1911, Jane's all the World's Aircraft 1957–58, American flying boats and amphibious aircraft: an illustrated history

General characteristics

- Crew: 11
- Length: 100 ft 7 in (30.66 m)
- Wingspan: 117 ft 2 in (35.71 m)
- Height: 32 ft 9 in (9.98 m)
- Wing area: 1,406 sq ft (130.6 m^{2})
- Empty weight: 50,485 lb (22,900 kg)
- Gross weight: 76,595 lb (34,743 kg)
- Max takeoff weight: 78,000 lb (35,380 kg)
- Powerplant: 2 × Wright R-3350-32WA Duplex-Cyclone 18-cylinder air-cooled radial piston engines with water injection, 3,450 hp (2,570 kW) each
- Propellers: 4-bladed fully-reversible constant-speed propellers

Performance

- Maximum speed: 251 mph (404 km/h, 218 kn) at sea level
- Cruise speed: 150 mph (240 km/h, 130 kn) at 1,000 ft (300 m)
- Range: 2,050 mi (3,300 km, 1,780 nmi)
- Service ceiling: 24,000 ft (7,300 m)
- Rate of climb: 1,200 ft/min (6.1 m/s)
- Wing loading: 60.5 lb/sq ft (295 kg/m^{2})
- Power/mass: 0.13 kW/kg

Armament
up to 8,000 lb (3,600 kg) internally in nacelle bomb-bays + up to 8,000 lb (3,600 kg) externally under the wings

- 4 × 2,160 lb (980 kg) torpedoes or
- 4 × 2,000 lb (907 kg) mines or bombs or
- 8 × 1,000 lb (454 kg) mines or
- 16 × 500 lb (227 kg) bombs or
- 16 × 330 lb (150 kg) depth charges or
- 1 × Mark 90 nuclear bomb nuclear depth charge

Avionics

- AN/APS-44 radar (later replaced by AN/APS-80 radar)
- Julie echo-ranging active sonar
- AN/AQA-3 Jezebel acoustic search passive sonar

== See also ==
Related development

- Martin PBM Mariner

Aircraft of comparable role, configuration, and era

- Beriev Be-12
- Shin Meiwa US-1A
- Short Sunderland

Related lists

- List of flying boats and floatplanes
- List of military aircraft of the United States
- List of United States Navy aircraft designations (pre-1962)
- Operation Market Time, long-running coastal blockade operation against Vietnam
