= Neptune Mission =

- Title frame
- Directed by: Walford Hewitson
- Written by: Stuart Nutter
- Produced by: David Bairstow
- Narrated by: Budd Knapp
- Cinematography: Peter Kelly; Reginald Morris
- Edited by: Lucien Marleau; Tony Lower
- Production company: National Film Board of Canada
- Distributed by: Canadian Broadcasting Corporation; National Film Board of Canada
- Release dates: March 2, 1958; May 25, 1958 (re-broadcast as Neptune's Mission)
- Running time: 30 minutes
- Country: Canada
- Language: English

Neptune Mission (also known as Neptune's Mission) is a 1958 30-minute Canadian short documentary film produced by the National Film Board of Canada (NFB) for the Canadian Broadcasting Corporation (CBC) television series, Perspective. (Note: The introduction of the Lockheed Neptune into service with the Royal Canadian Air Force (RCAF) was featured in an earlier 1955 NFB Eye Witness (No. 79) series segment entitled New Aircraft Joins Maritime Command, directed by Hector Lemieux.) The film documents the submarine-hunting mission of the RCAF Neptune aircraft on Canada's Atlantic coastline during the Cold War. Neptune Mission is produced by David Bairstow, and directed by Walford Hewitson.

== Synopsis ==
During the Second World War, from its Halifax, Nova Scotia headquarters, the Royal Canadian Air Force PBY Canso aircraft, along with the Royal Canadian Navy (RCN), were heavily involved in anti-submarine warfare (ASW) directed against Nazi U-boat attacks on convoy and coastal shipping. In postwar operations, building on the success of its wartime missions, the RCAF continued to maintain anti-submarine capability from their Greenwood, Nova Scotia base.

In 1958, during the Cold War, the threat of Soviet nuclear-powered submarines led the RCAF to acquire Lockheed P2V-7 Neptune aircraft. The advent of airborne radar, sonar and magnetic anomaly detection (MAD)-equipped aircraft such as the Neptune, made for a potent counter. The armament on the P2V-7 included two torpedoes, mines, depth charges, bombs carried internally plus unguided rockets mounted externally underwing.

On annual North Atlantic Treaty Organization (NATO) exercises, the RCAF Neptune crews worked closely with naval forces from both Canada and the United States, and through joint operations, continued to train for operational readiness. On a typical training mission, an RCAF crew will receive instructions from its Halifax headquarters, and fly in a combined aerial and naval mission using airborne MAD/sonobuoy equipment to detect a submarine attempting to penetrate the naval forces protecting a high value target such as a convoy or aircraft carrier task force.

In the 1958 Delta 54 training exercise, an RCAF Neptune (VN-123) flies a precise pattern over the Atlantic Ocean when a radar contact of a "spook" is made. (Note: A "spook" in military terminology refers to a clandestine or secret operator/operation.) Two destroyers take up the chase, leaving the task force and joining Neptune VN-123. Using sonobuoys, the Neptune relays an exact location of the contact to the destroyers that take up station over the suspected submerged enemy submarine, now forced to either escape or curtail its threat to the task force. The exercise concludes with another RCAF Neptune relieving VN-123 to return to its base in Nova Scotia.

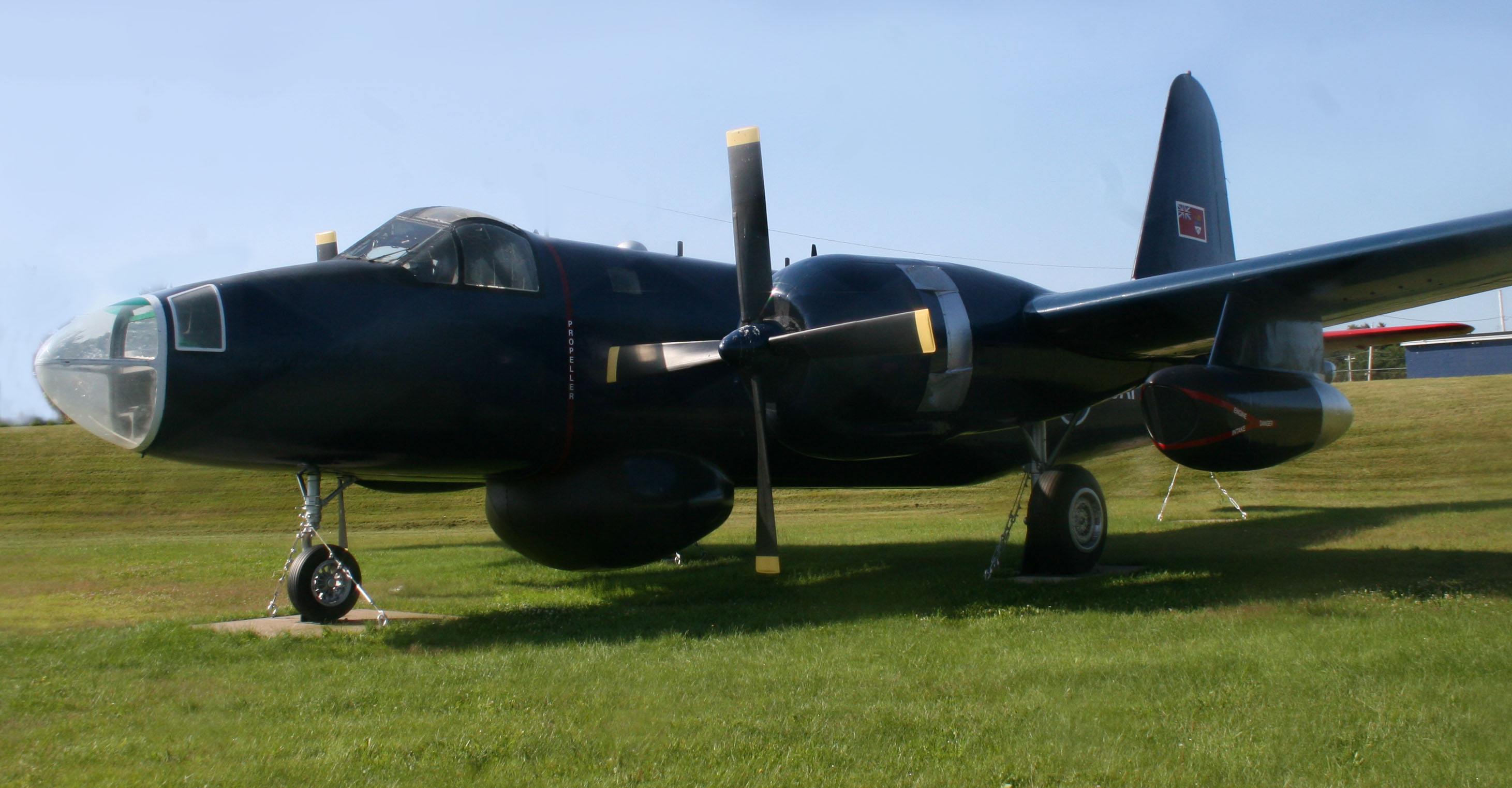
A Lockheed Neptune in the 1950s RCAF colour scheme is on display at the Greenwood Military Aviation Museum, CFB Greenwood, Nova Scotia.

== Production ==
Neptune Mission was part of the NFB's series of documentary short films for the CBC TV series Perspective that ran from 1956–58. Each half-hour program, produced by the National Film Board included both documentaries and dramatic productions. Most episodes concerned contemporary issues in Canada, although several involved international incidents or topics such as life in Haiti. A small number of the Perspective series were historical reconstructions. Generals Wolfe and Montcalm at the Battle of the Plains of Abraham was one example.

A close working relationship with the RCAF and the RCN allowed the NFB to chronicle the operational use of the Neptune. The aircrew of VN-123 played their parts as themselves, while the aircraft went through its operational mission from headquarters planning, crew walkabout, surveillance training to successful completion of the NATO exercise. The aerial sequences by NFB cinematographers Peter Kelly and Reginald Morris, along with sound engineer Don Wellington. included footage shot from accompanying aircraft and naval vessels, as well as from inside the Neptune as it went through its training mission.

== Reception ==
Neptune Mission was primarily made-for-television, but after broadcast on March 2, 1958, with a re-broadcast on May 25, 1958, as Neptune's Mission on the CBC, the film was made available on 16 mm to schools, libraries and other interested parties. The film was also made available to film libraries operated by university and provincial authorities. Excerpts from Neptune Mission appeared in other NFB productions, including The Golden Age (1959).
