= Lockheed P-2 Neptune =

Family of maritime patrol aircraft

P-2 (P2V) Neptune
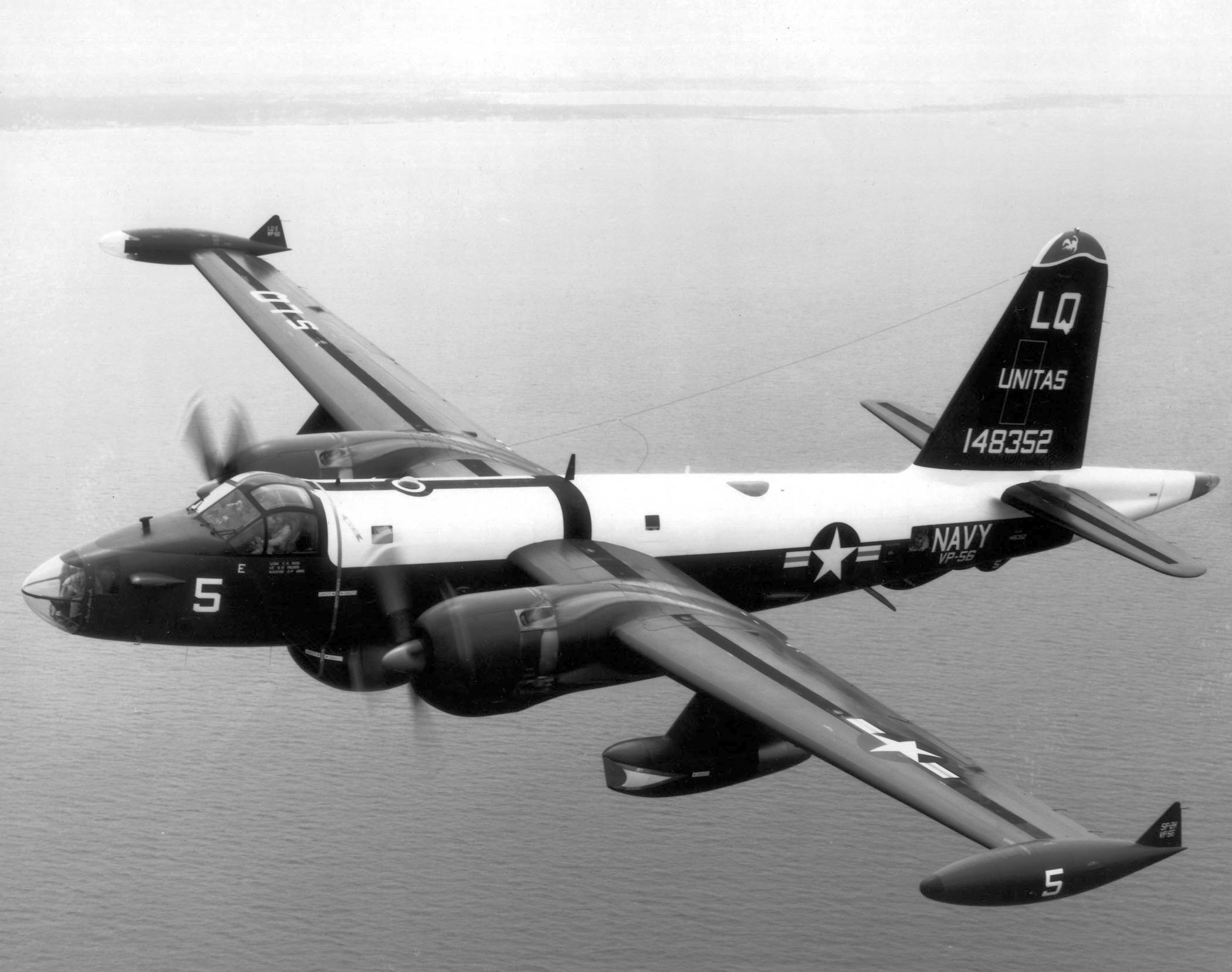
- SP-2H of VP-56 over the Atlantic.

General information
- Type: Maritime patrol and anti-submarine warfare aircraft
- National origin: United States
- Manufacturer: Lockheed
- Status: Retired
- Primary users: United States Navy Japan Maritime Self-Defense Force; Royal Australian Air Force; Royal Canadian Air Force
- Number built: 1,177 (total)

History
- Introduction date: March 1947
- First flight: 17 May 1945
- Retired: 1984 (military) 2017 (civilian)
- Variant: Kawasaki P-2J

The Lockheed P-2 Neptune (designated P2V by the United States Navy (USN) prior to September 1962) was a maritime patrol and antisubmarine warfare (ASW) aircraft. It was developed for the USN by Lockheed to replace the Lockheed PV-1 Ventura and PV-2 Harpoon and was replaced, in turn, by the Lockheed P-3 Orion. Designed as a land-based aircraft, the Neptune never made a carrier landing, but a few were converted and deployed as carrier-launched (using JATO assist), stop-gap nuclear bombers that would have to land on shore or ditch. The type was successful in export and saw service with several armed forces.

== Design and development ==
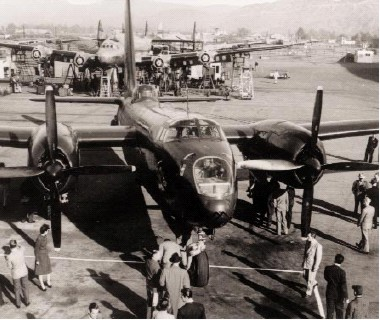
XP2V-1 prototype in 1945

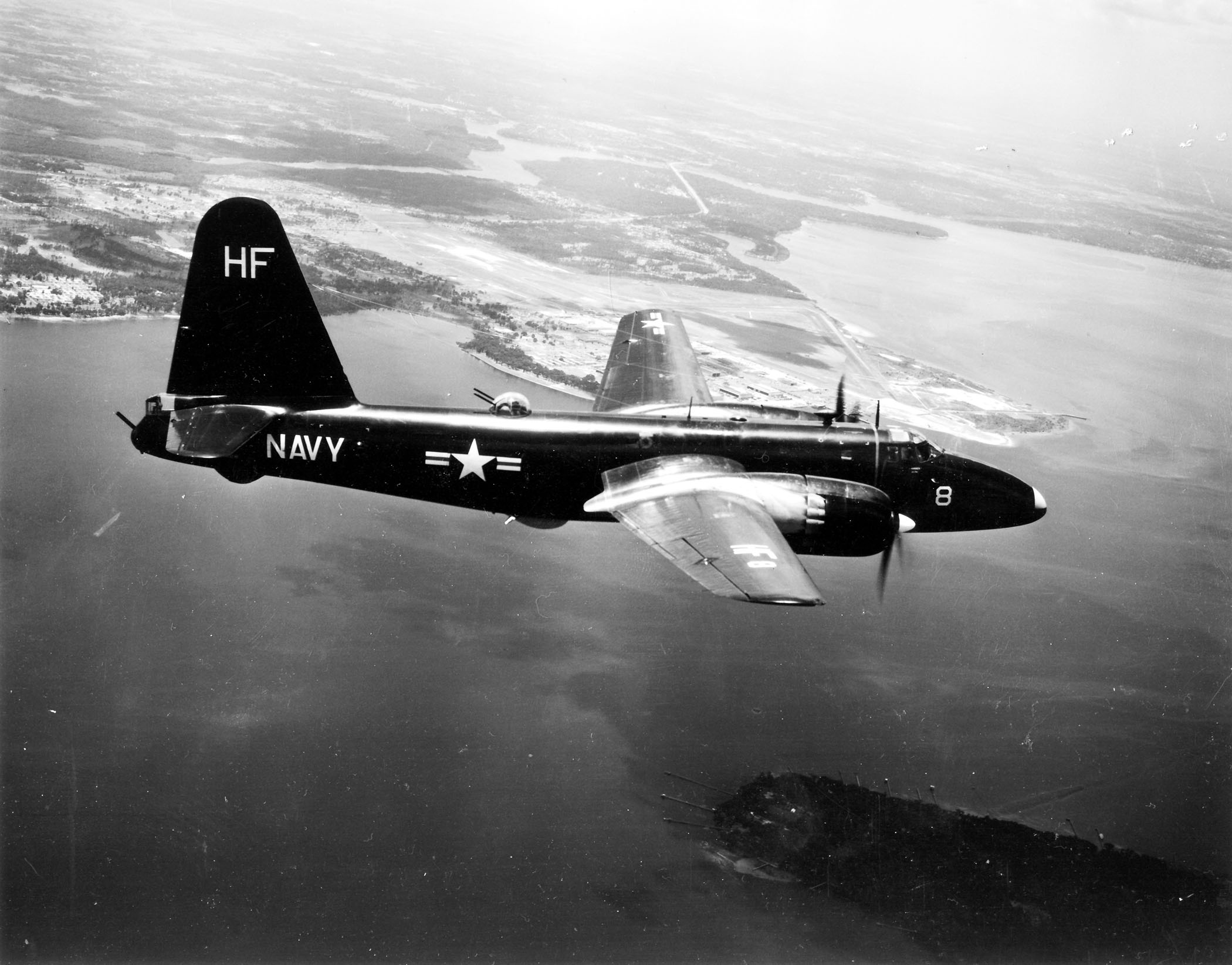
P2V-2 of VP-18 over NAS Jacksonville, 1953

Development of a new land-based patrol bomber began early in World War II, with design work starting at Lockheed's Vega subsidiary as a private venture on 6 December 1941. At first, the new design was considered a low priority compared to other aircraft in development at the time, with Vega also developing and producing the PV-2 Harpoon patrol bomber. On 19 February 1943, the USN signed a letter of intent for two prototype XP2Vs, which was confirmed by a formal contract on 4 April 1944 with a further 15 aircraft being ordered 10 days later. The program did not go into full swing until 1944. A major factor in the design was ease of manufacture and maintenance, and this may have been a major factor in the type's long life and worldwide success. The first aircraft flew in May 1945. Production began in 1946, and the aircraft was accepted into service in 1947. Potential use as a bomber led to successful launches from aircraft carriers.

Beginning with the P2V-5F model, the Neptune became one of the first operational aircraft fitted with both piston and jet engines. The Convair B-36, several Boeing C-97 Stratofreighter, Fairchild C-123 Provider, North American AJ Savage, and Avro Shackleton aircraft were also so equipped. To save weight and complexity of two separate fuel systems, the Westinghouse J34 jet engines on P2Vs burned the 115–145 Avgas fuel of the piston engines, instead of jet fuel. The jet pods were fitted with intake doors that remained closed when the J-34s were not running. This prevented windmilling, allowing for economical piston-engine-only, long-endurance search-and-patrol operations. In normal USN operations, the jet engines were run at full power (97%) to assure takeoff, then shut down upon reaching a safe altitude. The jets were also started and kept running at flight idle during low-altitude (500-foot (150 m) flight during the day and 1,000-foot (300 m) at night) antisubmarine and/or antishipping operations as a safety measure should one of the radials develop problems.

Normal crew access was by a ladder on the aft bulkhead of the nosewheel well to a hatch on the left side of the wheel well, then forward to the observer nose, or up through another hatch to the main deck. Also, a hatch was in the floor of the aft fuselage, near the sonobuoy chutes.

== Operational history ==
=== Early Cold War ===
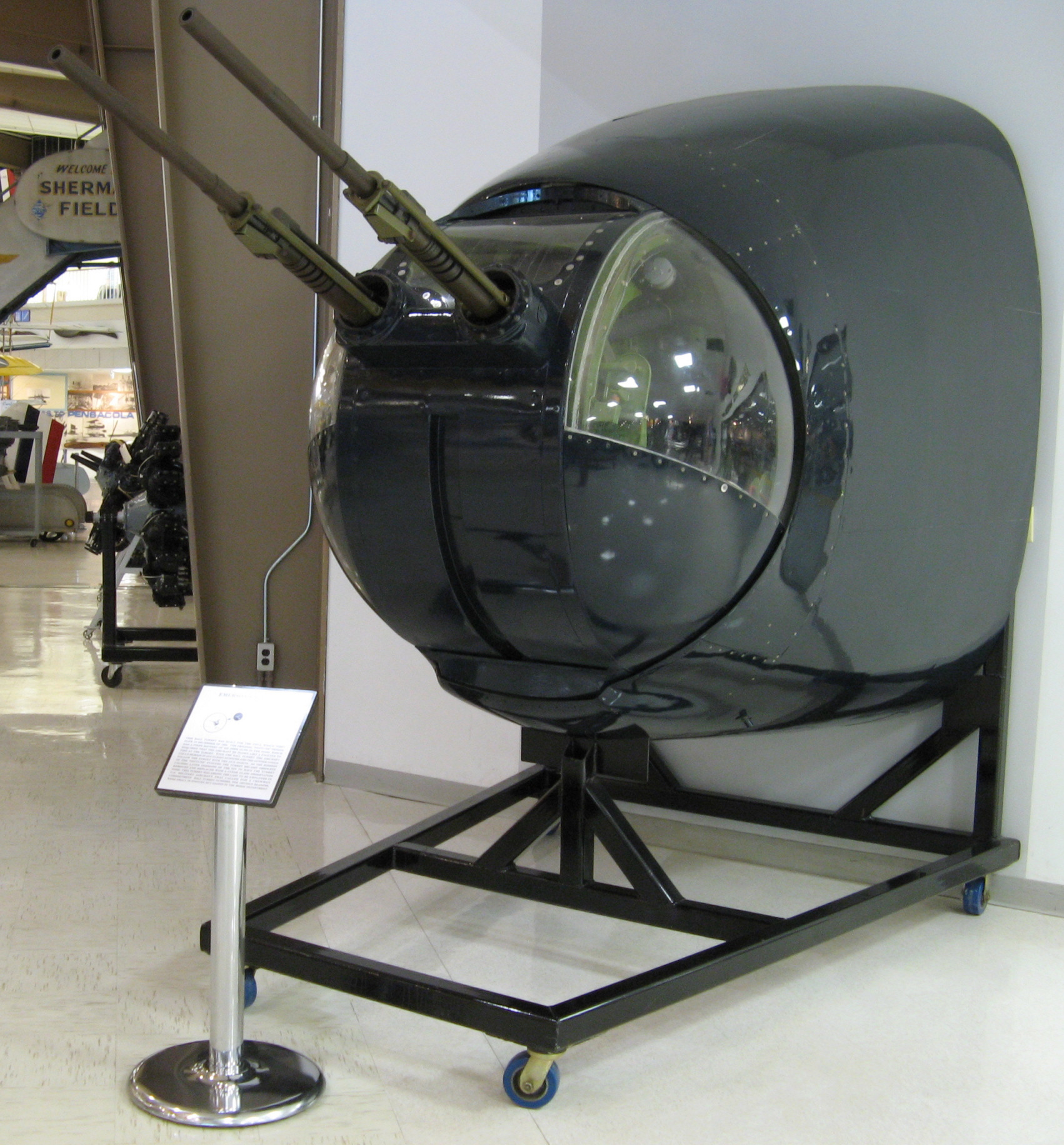
Aero 9B nose turret from the Neptune at the National Naval Aviation Museum, Florida, 2007: Mostly the one-foot-longer Aero 9C turret was installed.

Before the P-3 Orion arrived in the mid-1960s, the Neptune was the primary U.S. land-based antisubmarine patrol aircraft, intended to be operated as the hunter of a "hunter-killer" group, with destroyers employed as killers. Several features aided the P-2 in its hunter role:

- Sonobuoys could be launched from a station in the aft portion of the fuselage and monitored by radio.
- Some models were equipped with "pointable" twin .50 cal (12.7 mm) machine guns in the nose, but most had a forward observation bubble with an observer seat, a feature often seen in images.
- The AN/ASQ-8 magnetic anomaly detector was fitted in an extended tail, producing a paper chart. Unmarked charts were not classified, but those with annotations were classified as secret.
- A belly-mounted AN/APS-20 surface-search radar enabled detection of surfaced and snorkeling submarines at considerable distances.

As the P-2 was replaced in the USN by the P-3A Orion in active fleet squadrons in the early and mid-1960s, the P-2 continued to remain operational in the Naval Air Reserve through the mid-1970s, primarily in its SP-2H version. As active fleet squadrons transitioned to the P-3B and P-3C in the mid- and late 1960s and early 1970s, the Naval Air Reserve P-2s were eventually replaced by P-3As and P-3Bs and the P-2 exited active U.S. naval service. VP-23 was the last active-duty patrol squadron to operate the SP-2H, retiring its last Neptune on 20 February 1970, while the last Naval Reserve patrol squadron to operate the Neptune, VP-94, retired its last SP-2H in 1978.

=== Nuclear bomber ===
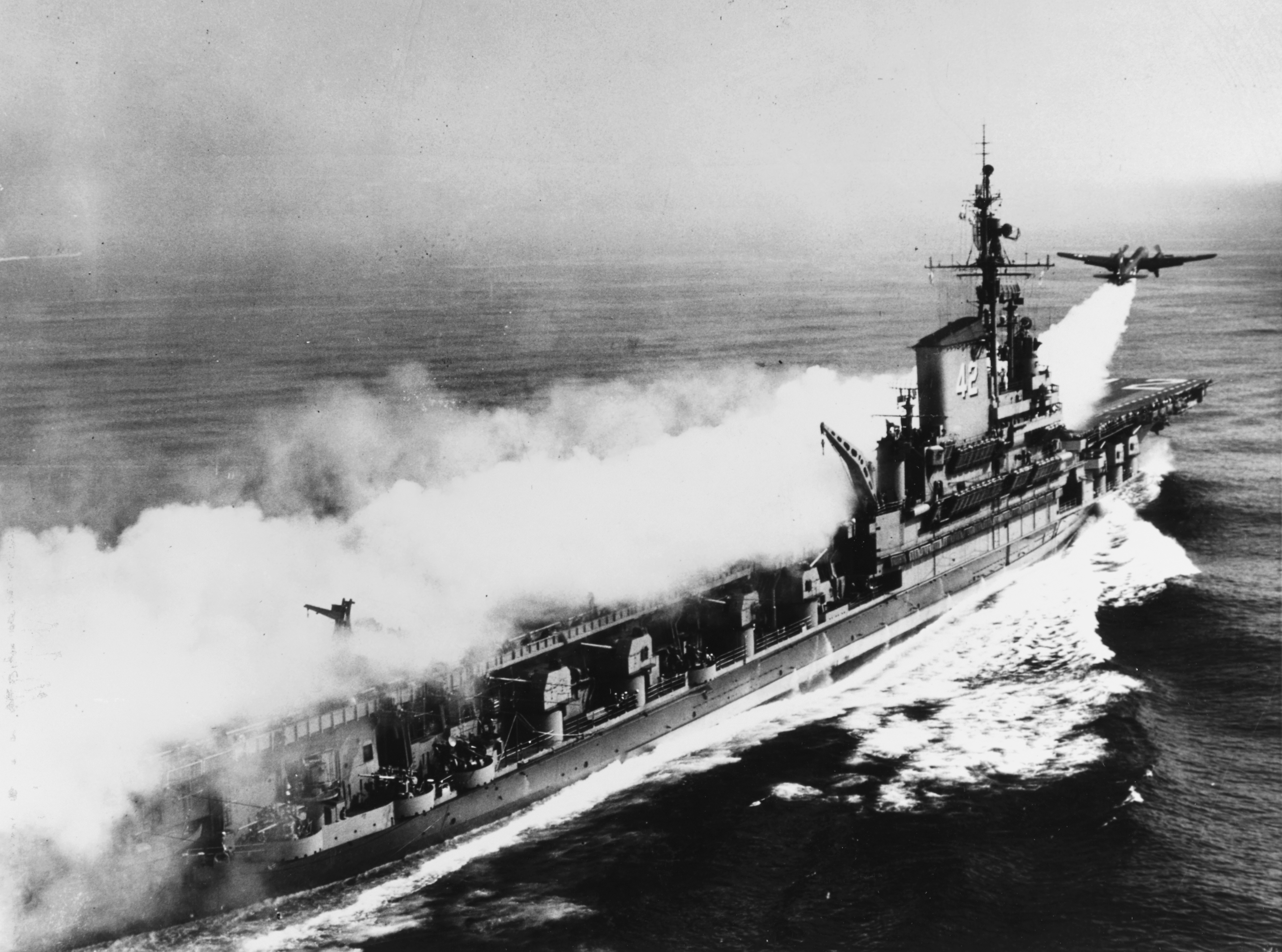
A P2V takes off from USS Franklin D. Roosevelt in 1951

At the end of World War II, USN leaders felt the need to acquire a nuclear strike capability to maintain the Navy's relevance (see Revolt of the Admirals). In the short term, carrier-based aircraft were the best solution. The large Fat Man nuclear munitions at that time were bulky and required a very large aircraft to carry them. The USN Bureau of Ordnance built 25 outdated but more compact Little Boy nuclear bombs to be used in the smaller bomb bay of the P2V Neptune. Enough fissionable material was available by 1948 to build 10 complete uranium projectiles and targets, although only enough initiators were available to complete six. The U.S. Navy improvised a carrier-based nuclear strike aircraft by modifying the P2V Neptune for carrier takeoff using jet-assisted takeoff rocket boosters, with initial takeoff tests in 1948. However, the Neptune could not land on a carrier, so the crew had to either make their way to a friendly land base after a strike or ditch in the sea near a USN vessel. It was replaced in this emergency role by the North American AJ Savage and was transferred to the Pacific Fleet in October 1952, the first nuclear strike aircraft that was fully capable of carrier launch and recovery operations; it was also short-lived in that role as the USN was adopting fully jet-powered nuclear-strike aircraft.

=== Covert operations P2V-7U/RB-69A variants ===
In 1954, under Project Cherry, the US Central Intelligence Agency (CIA) obtained five newly built P2V-7 aircraft and converted them into P2V-7U/RB-69A variants by Lockheed's Skunk Works at Hangar B5 in Burbank, California, for the CIA's own private fleet of covert ELINT/ferret aircraft. Later, to make up for P2V-7U/RB-69A operational losses, the CIA obtained and converted two existing US Navy P2V-7s, one in September 1962 and one in December 1964, to P2V-7U/RB-69A Phase VI standard, and it also acquired an older P2V-5 from the USN as a training aircraft in 1963. Test flights were made by lead aircraft at Edwards AFB from 1955 to 1956 with all the aircraft painted with a dark sea blue color, but with USAF markings. In 1957, one P2V-7U was sent to Eglin AFB for testing aircraft performance at low level and under adverse conditions.

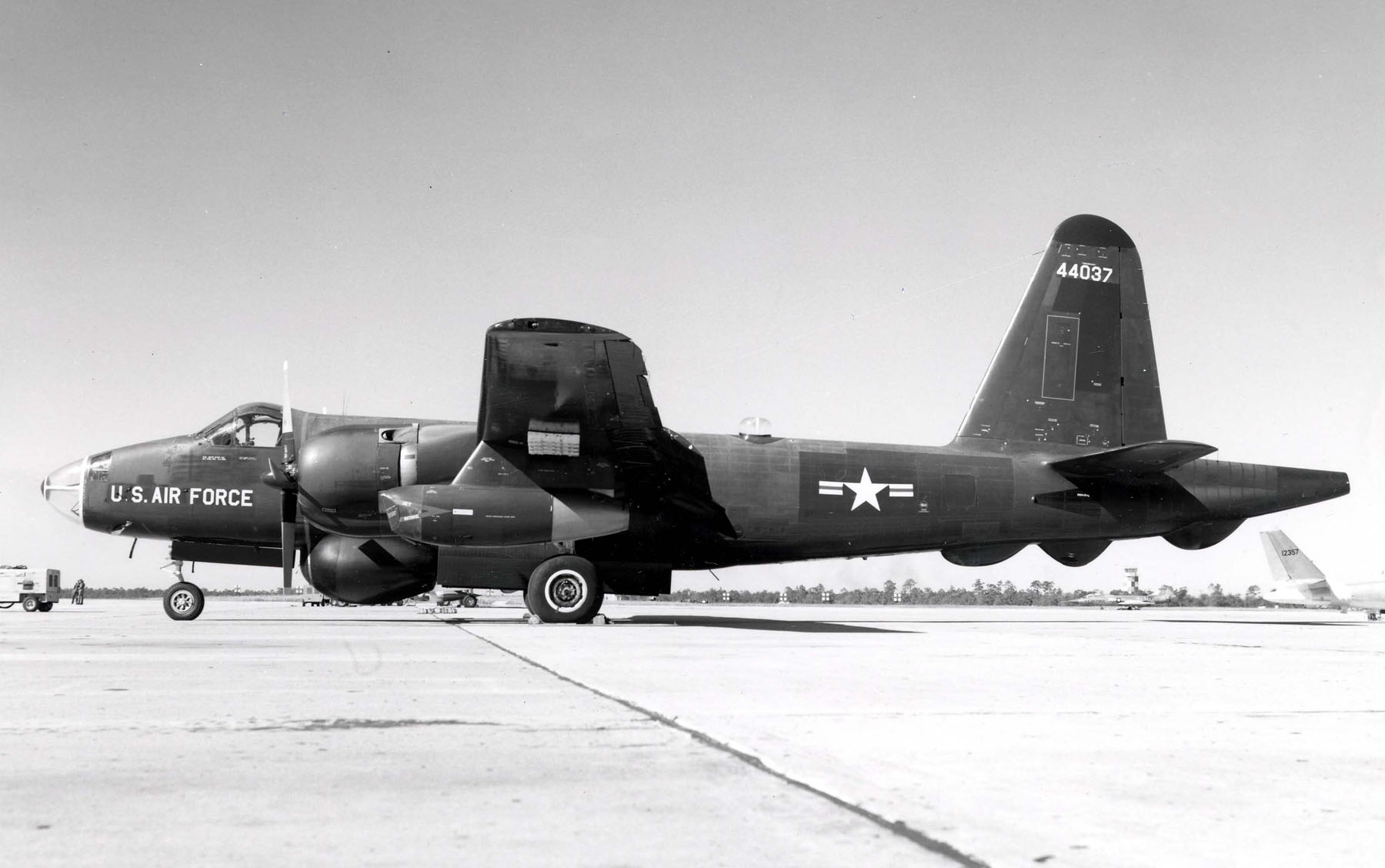
Side view of RB-69A, the first converted P2V-7U

The initial two aircraft were sent to Europe, based at Wiesbaden, West Germany, but were later withdrawn in 1959 when the CIA reduced its covert aircraft assets in Europe. The CIA sent the other two P2V-7U/RB-69As to Hsinchu Air Base, Taiwan, where by December 1957, they were given to a "black op" unit, the 34th Squadron, better known as the Black Bat Squadron, of the Republic of China Air Force (ROCAF); these were painted in ROCAF markings. The ROCAF P2V-7U/RB-69A's mission was to conduct low-level penetration flights into mainland China to conduct ELINT/ferret missions, including mapping out China's air-defense networks, inserting agents via airdrop, and dropping leaflets and supplies. The agreement for plausible deniability between US and Republic of China governments meant the RB-69A would be manned by ROCAF crew while conducting operational missions, but would be manned by CIA crew when ferrying RB-69As out of Taiwan or other operational areas to US.

The P2V-7U/RB-69A flew with ROCAF Black Bat Squadron over China from 1957 to November 1966. All five original aircraft were lost with all hands on board; two crashed in South Korea and three were shot down over China. In January 1967, two remaining RB-69As flew back to NAS Alameda, California, and were converted back to regular US Navy P2V-7/SP-2H ASW aircraft configurations. Most of the 34th Squadron's black-op missions remain classified by the CIA—though a CIA internal draft history, Low-Level Technical Reconnaissance over Mainland China (1955–66), reference CSHP-2.348, written in 1972 that covers CIA/ROCAF 34th Squadron's black-op missions is known to exist. The CIA did not plan to declassify it until after 2022.

=== Vietnam War ===
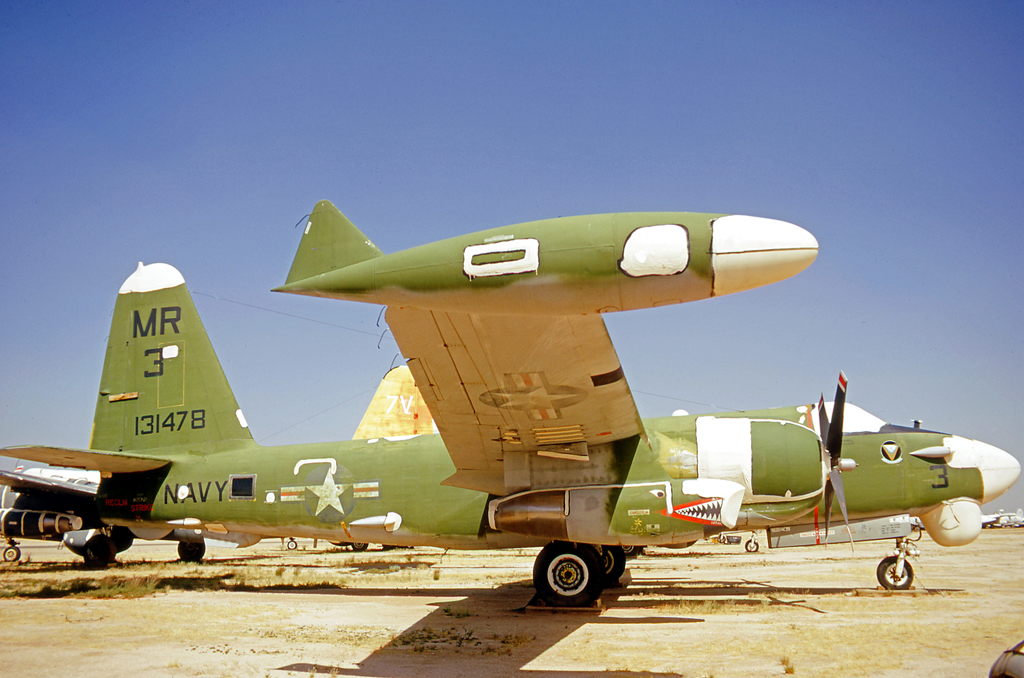
OP-2E Neptune formerly of VO-67, in AMARG storage at Davis-Monthan AFB, c. 1971: The camouflage is green for low-level operations over Vietnam.

During the Vietnam War, the Neptune was used by the USN as a gunship, as an overland reconnaissance and sensor deployment aircraft, and in its traditional role as a maritime patrol aircraft. The Neptune was also used by the US Army's 1st Radio Research Company (Aviation), call sign "Crazy Cat", based at Cam Ranh Air Base in South Vietnam, as an electronic "ferret" aircraft intercepting low-powered tactical voice and Morse code radio signals. The US Army operated the P-2 from 1967 until 1972, flying 42,500 hours with no accidents. Observation Squadron 67 (VO-67), call sign "Lindy", was the only P-2 Neptune aircraft squadron to ever receive the Presidential Unit Citation, flying Igloo White missions sowing seismic and acoustic sensors over the Ho Chi Minh trail. VO-67 lost three OP-2E aircraft and 20 aircrew to ground fire during its secret missions into Laos and Vietnam in 1967–68. The ROCAFsecret 34th Black Bat Squadron's RB-69A/P2V-7U ELINT/SIGINT aircraft flew a low-level electronic reconnaissance from Da Nang Air Base, flying over Thanh Hóa Province on 20 August 1963 to investigate an air resupply drop zone that turned out to be a trap for a ROCAF C-123B airdrop mission 10 days earlier due to the air-inserted agents having been captured and turned. The next year, an air-defense radar-mapping mission was also flown by 34th Squadron's RB-69A/P2V-7U aircraft into North Vietnam and Laos on the night of 16 March 1964. The RB-69A took off from Da Nang, flew up the Gulf of Tonkin before coasting in near Haiphong, then flew along the North Vietnam and Laos border. The mission was requested by the Studies and Observations Group for helping plan the insert or resupply of agents. Seven AAA sites, 14 early-warning radar sites, and two ground-controlled interception radar signals were detected.

Royal Australian Air Force (RAAF) Neptunes were also involved in the Vietnam War. These aircraft helped escort the fast transport HMAS Sydney from Australia to South Vietnam on several occasions in 1965 and 1966. RAAF Neptunes also occasionally operated as airborne early-warning aircraft over Thailand using their AN/APS-120 radar; this was done only when the aircraft were transiting through Thai airspace on other taskings. During these sorties, the Neptunes warned American aircraft operating over North Vietnam of Vietnamese surface-to-air missile launches.

=== Falklands War ===
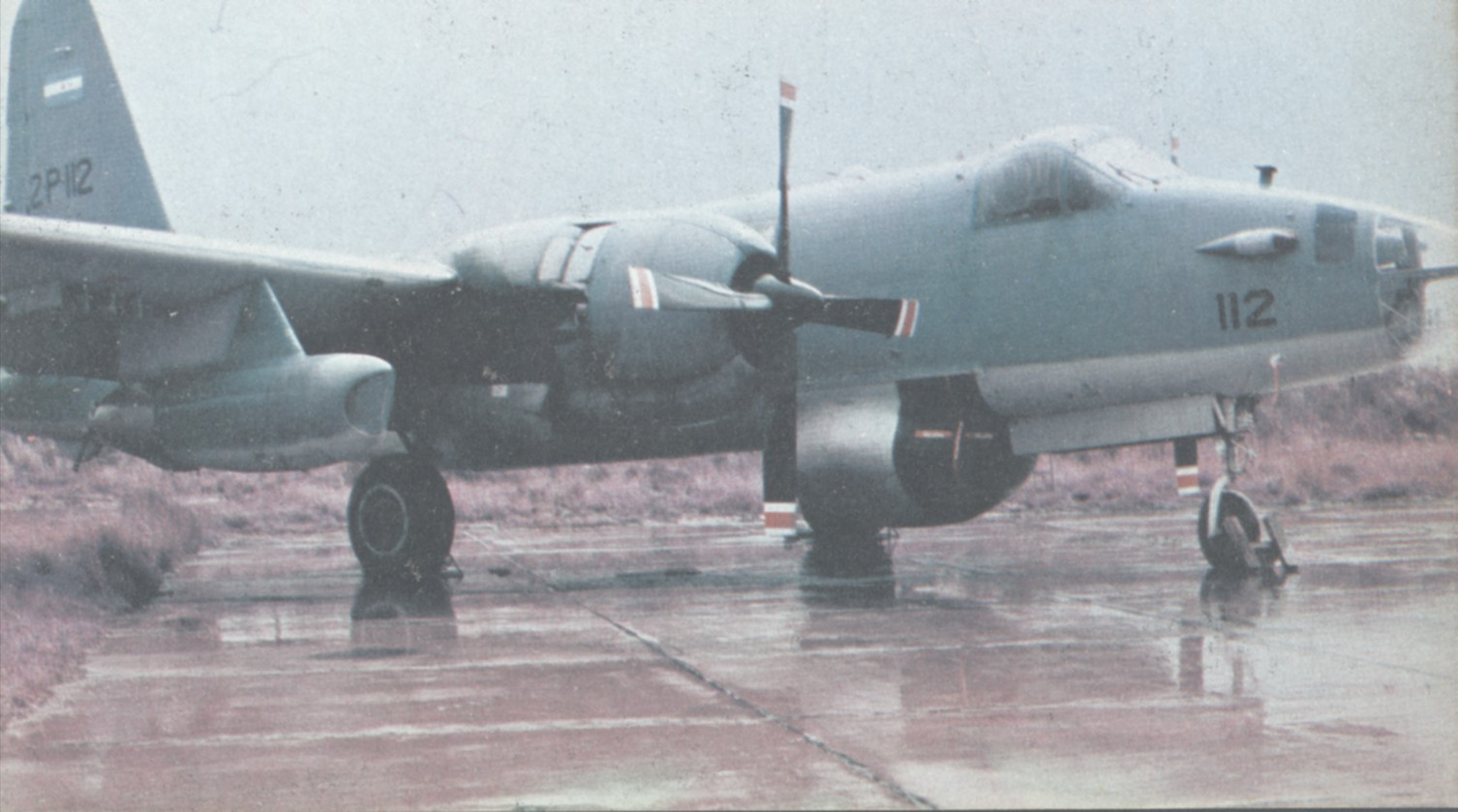
The Argentine Navy SP-2H that tracked HMS Sheffield

The Argentine Naval Aviation had received at least 16 Neptunes of different variants since 1958, including eight former RAF examples for use in the Escuadrilla Aeronaval de Exploración (Naval Exploration Squadron). They were intensively used in 1978 during the Operation Soberania against Chile, including over the Pacific Ocean.

During the Falklands War in 1982, the last two airframes in service (2-P-111 and 2-P-112) carried out reconnaissance missions over the South Atlantic, and on 4 May, after detecting a group of British warships, helped to direct an attack by two Dassault Super Étendards that resulted in the sinking of the British destroyer HMS Sheffield. The lack of spare parts, caused by the US having enacted an arms embargo in 1977 due to the Dirty War, led to the type being retired before the end of the war; Argentine Air Force Lockheed C-130 Hercules took over the task of searching for targets for strike aircraft.

=== Other military operators ===
The Royal Canadian Air Force's Maritime Air Command replaced its aging Avro Lancaster maritime patrol aircraft beginning in 1955 with P2V-7 Neptunes in the antisubmarine, anti-shipping, and maritime-reconnaissance roles, as a stopgap pending deliveries of the Canadair CP-107 Argus, which began in 1960. Canadian Neptunes were delivered without the underwing Westinghouse J34 jet engine pods, which were retrofitted in 1959. Armament included two torpedoes, mines, depth charges, bombs carried internally, plus unguided rockets mounted under the wings. Twenty-five Neptunes served with 404, 405, and 407 squadrons until 1960. Upon unification of the Canadian forces in 1968, the Neptune was redesignated the CP122 and was officially retired two years later.

Australia also acquired Neptunes to supplement and then replace the aging Avro Lincoln in the reconnaissance and antisubmarine roles. The RAAF flew Neptunes from 1951 until 1978, at first with 11 Squadron (Pearce, WA) and then, from late 1953, with 10 Squadron (Richmond, NSW). RAAF Neptunes were fitted for ASW, surface-ship detection, and general reconnaissance. Twelve P2V4/5 (later designated P-2E) aircraft entered service with 11 Squadron in 1951. At first powered only by two R3350 radials, all were later retrofitted with Westinghouse J-34 auxiliary jets. Long-running severe spare parts shortages in the early 1950s made necessary putting half of the 12 aircraft in long-term storage from 1953. In August 1953, the rear and front turrets were removed and replaced with a MAD boom and a clear Perspex nose for observation. In the late 1960s, RAAF Neptune operations were wound down, and it was replaced with the P-3B Orion.

With the founding of NATO in 1949 and the resulting additional maritime commitments it entailed for Britain, the Royal Air Force Coastal Command operated 52 P2V-5s, designated Neptune MR.1, as a stop-gap modern maritime patrol aircraft until sufficient numbers of the Avro Shackleton could enter service. The Neptunes were used between 1952 and March 1957, for airborne early warning experiments, as well as for maritime patrol.

In Australia, the Netherlands, and the USN, its tasks were taken over by the larger and more capable P-3 Orion, and by the 1970s, it was in use only by patrol squadrons in the US Naval Reserve and the Dutch Navy. The 320 Squadron of the Royal Dutch Navy retired its last seven Neptunes in March 1982, as they were being replaced by the Lockheed Orion. The US Naval Reserve retired its last Neptunes in 1978, those aircraft also having been replaced by the P-3 Orion. By the 1980s, the Neptune had fallen out of military use in most purchasing nations, replaced by newer aircraft.

The Netherlands received its first Neptunes in 1953–54, when it acquired 12 P2V-5s. These remained in service until 1960, when they were transferred to Portugal. The P2V-5s were initially not replaced, with the antisubmarine aircraft requirement being met by carrier-borne Grumman S-2 Trackers. A new, urgent requirement for maritime patrol aircraft soon developed, for service over Dutch New Guinea, and 15 new P2V-7s were purchased, entering service from September 1961. While initially employed on reconnaissance and patrol duties, as Indonesian infiltration attempts against New Guinea increased, the Neptunes added bombing and strafing operations to their patrol duties. (Note: The Netherlands fitted its P2V-7s with the cannon-armed nose of the P2V-3 because of the potential counterinsurgency requirements.) On 17 May 1962, a Netherlands Navy Neptune shot down an Indonesian C-47 transport. A truce ended the conflict in September 1962, with Dutch New Guinea passing to UN control before becoming part of Indonesia, and the P2V-7s returned to Europe. The aircraft were upgraded to SP-2H standard soon after returning to the Netherlands, and remained in service until March 1982, when they were replaced by Lockheed Orions.

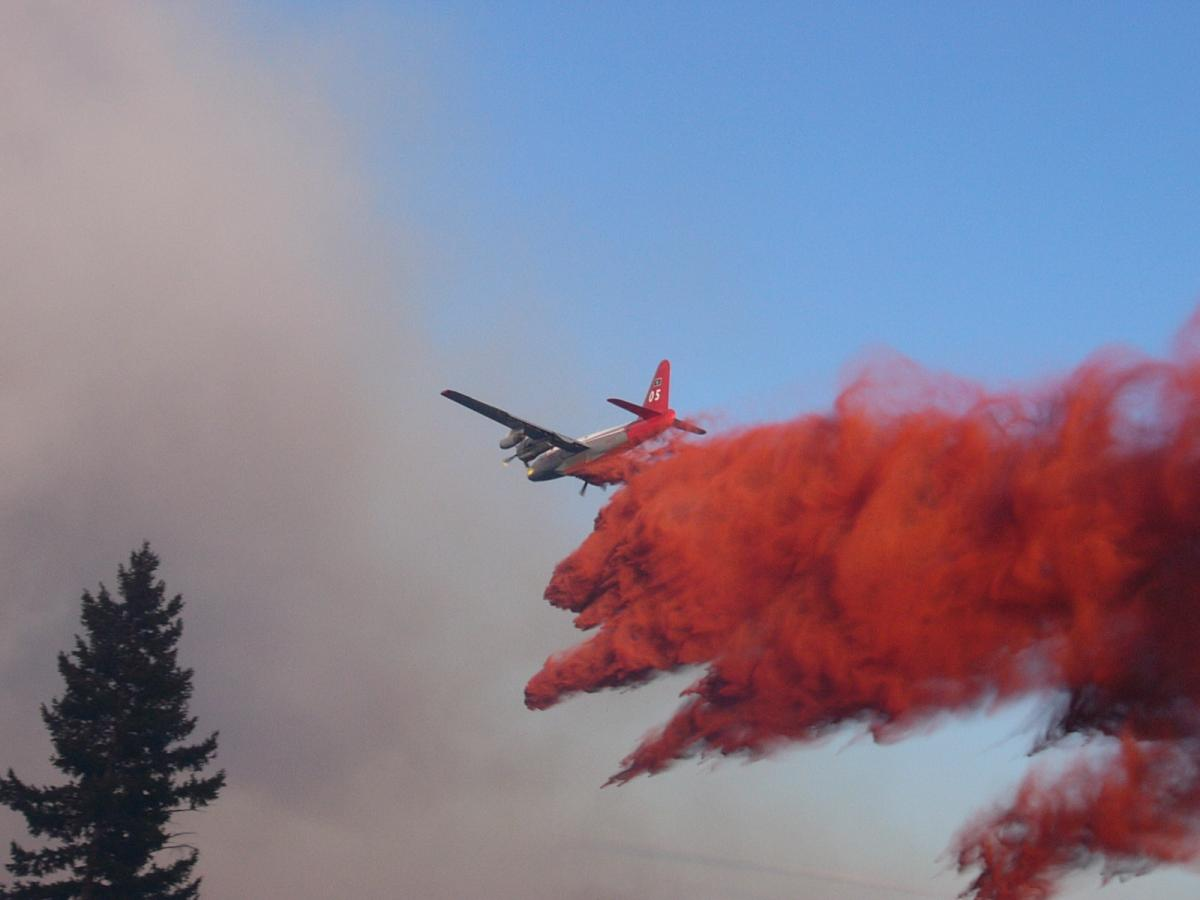
Neptune Aviation Services' P-2V Neptune drops Phos-Chek on the 2007 WSA Complex fire in Oregon.

In Japan, the Neptune was license-built from 1966 by Kawasaki as the P-2J, with the piston engines replaced by IHI-built T64 turboprops. Kawasaki continued their manufacture much later than Lockheed did; the P-2J remained in service until 1984.

=== Civilian firefighting ===
P-2/P2Vs have been employed in aerial firefighting roles by operators such as Minden Air Corp and Neptune Aviation Services. The fire fighters can carry 2,080 US gal (7,900 L) of retardant and have a service life of 15,000 hours. Neptune Aviation Services proposes to replace them with British Aerospace 146 aircraft, which have an estimated service life of 80,000 hours and carry upwards of 3,000 US gal (11,000 L; 2,500 imp gal) of retardant.

=== "The Truculent Turtle" ===
The third production P2V-1 was chosen for a record-setting mission, ostensibly to test crew endurance and long-range navigation, but also for publicity purposes, to display the capabilities of the USN's latest patrol bomber, and to surpass the standing record set by a Japanese Tachikawa Ki-77. Its nickname was "the Turtle", which was painted on the aircraft's nose (along with a cartoon of a turtle smoking a pipe pedaling a device attached to a propeller). However, in press releases immediately before the flight, the USN referred to it as "the Truculent Turtle".

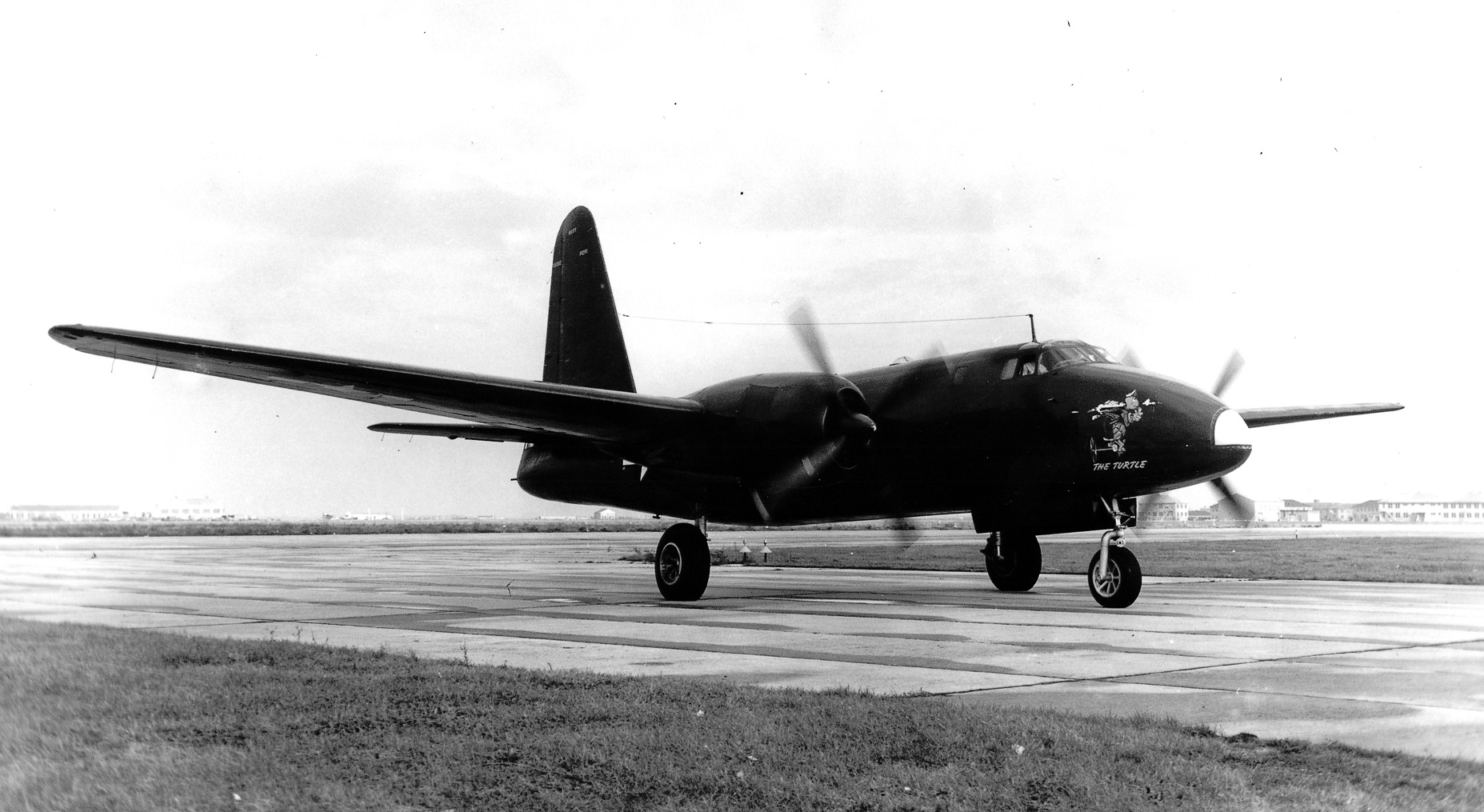
P2V-1 "The Turtle" in 1946

Loaded with fuel in extra tanks fitted in practically every spare space in the aircraft, the Turtle set out from Perth, Australia, to the United States. With a crew of four (and a nine-month-old gray kangaroo, a gift from Australia for the National Zoo in Washington, DC) the aircraft set off on 9 September 1946, with a rocket-assisted takeoff. About 2 1/2 days (55 h, 18 m) later, the Turtle touched down in Columbus, Ohio, after 11,236.6 mi (18,083.6 km). It was the longest unrefueled flight yet, beating the unofficial 10,212 mi (16,435 km) record set by the Japanese Tachikawa Ki-77. This stood as the absolute unrefueled distance record until 1962, when it was beaten by a USAF Boeing B-52 Stratofortress, and remained as a piston-engined record until 1986 when the Rutan Voyager broke it while circumnavigating the globe. The Turtle is preserved at the National Museum of Naval Aviation at NAS Pensacola.

== Variants ==
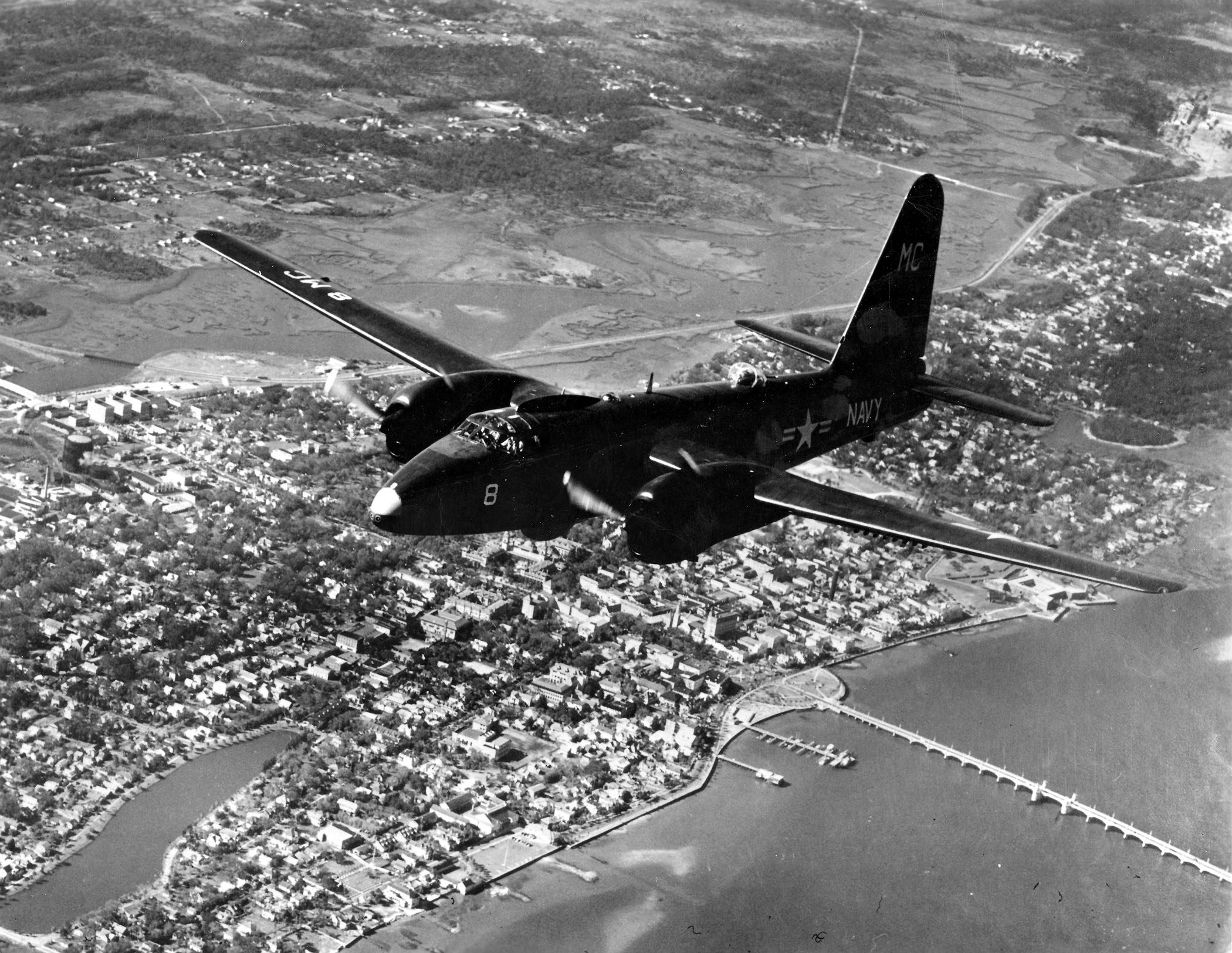
VP-5 P2V-3 in 1953

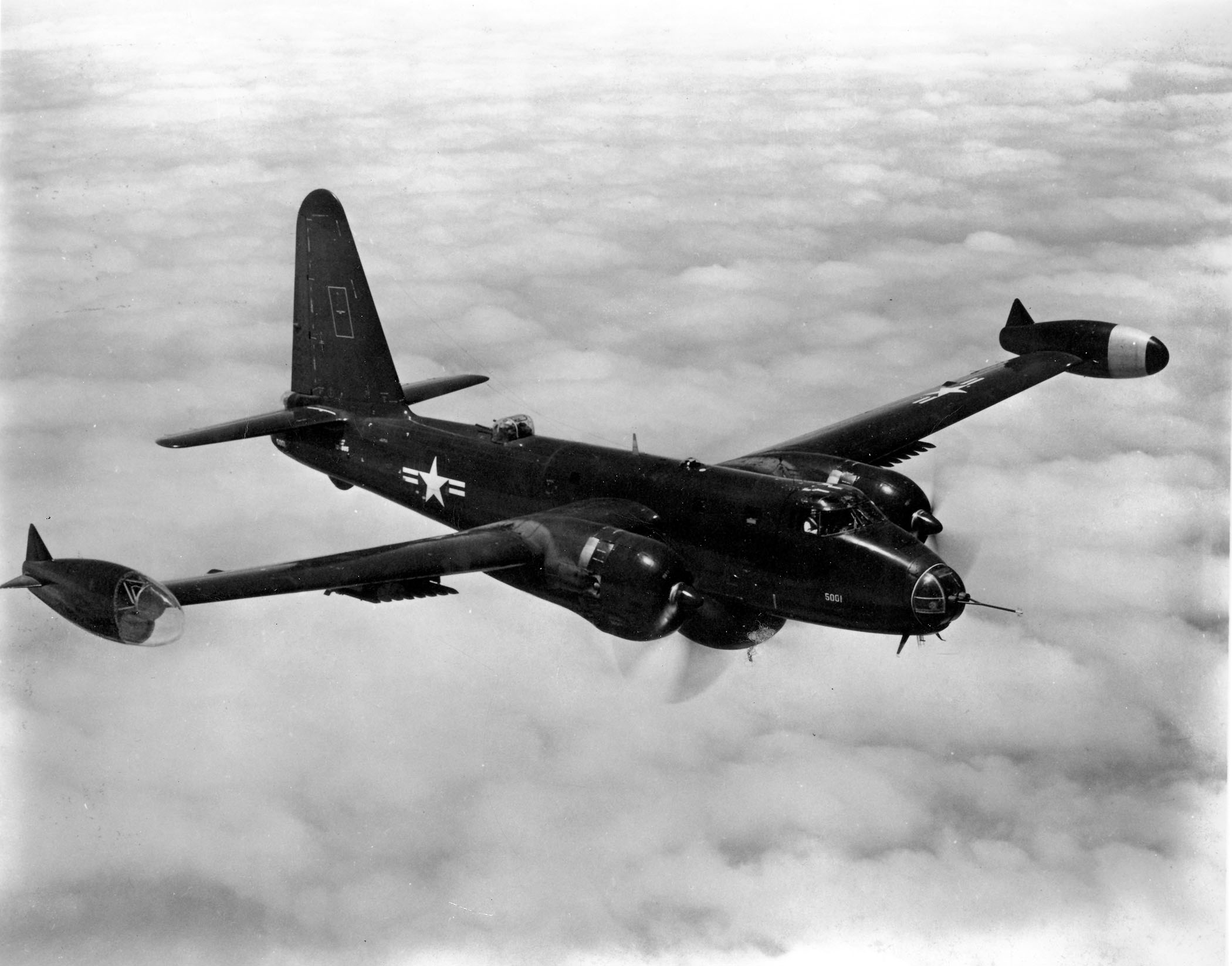
P2V-5 with nose turret in 1952

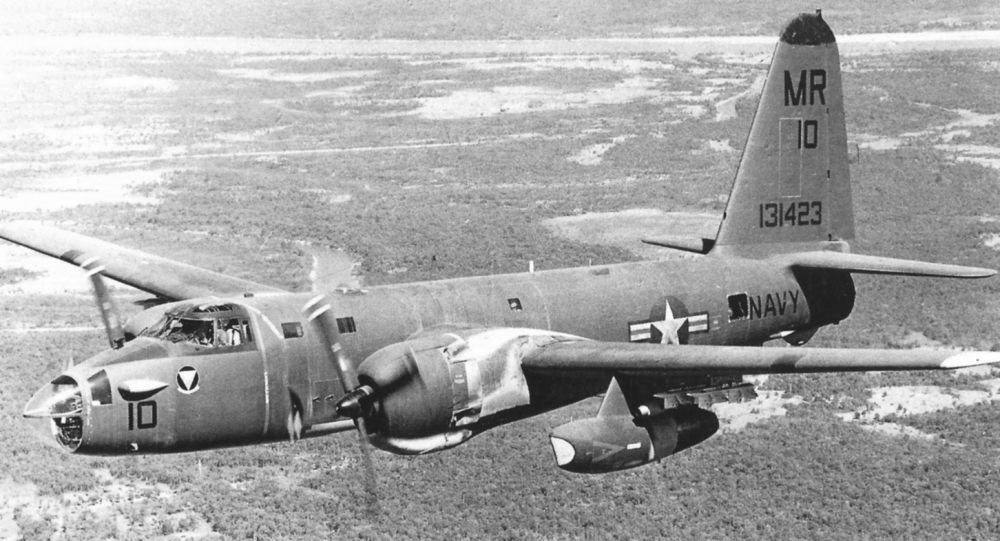
VO-67 OP-2E in 1967/68 over Laos

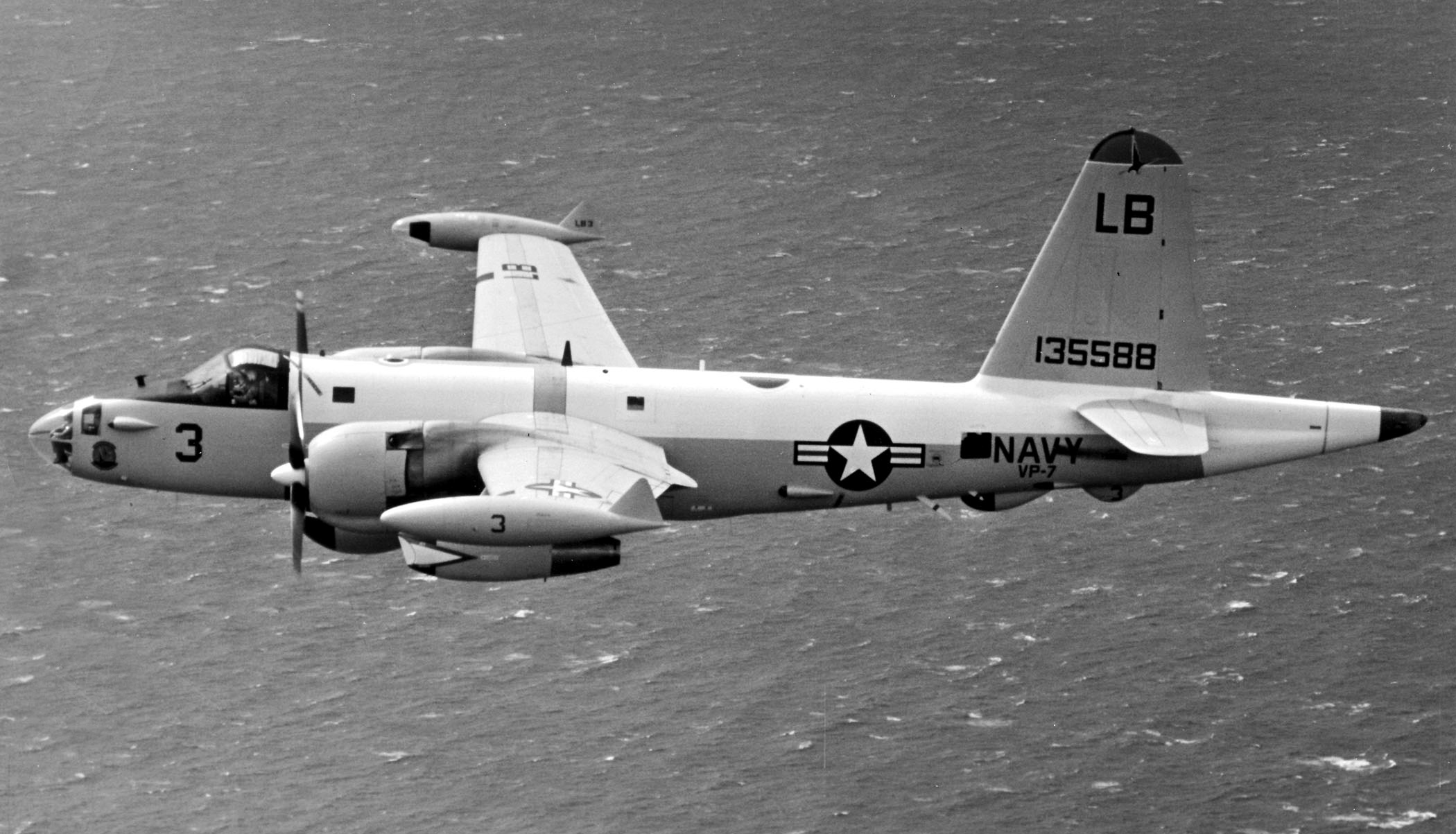
VP-7 P-2V

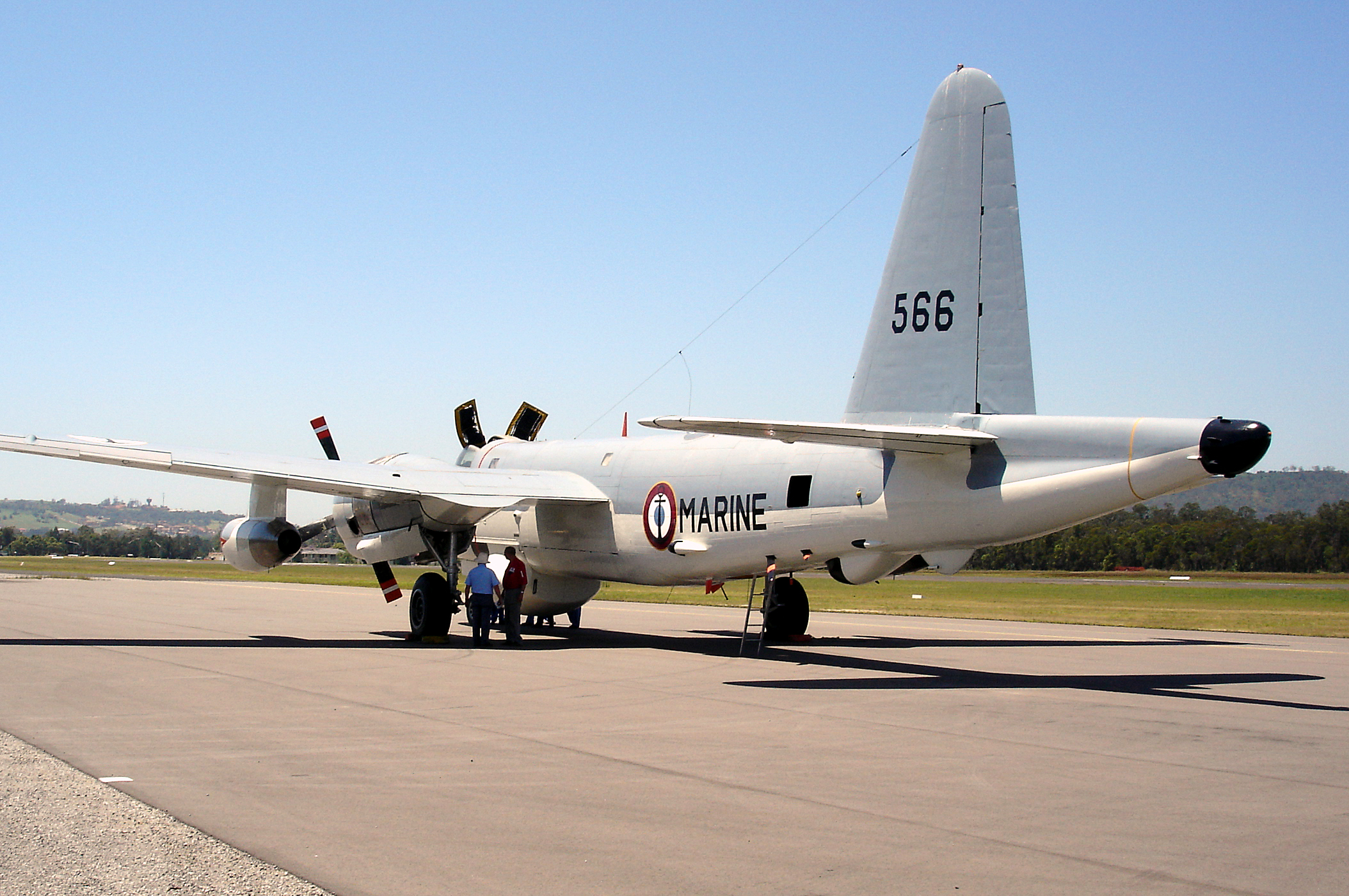
Ex-French Naval Aviation P-2H in use as a warbird in Australia: Note two open hatches above the cockpit, open hatch in the rear fuselage aft of the word "Marine", and ladder propped in the open hatch under the rear fuselage.

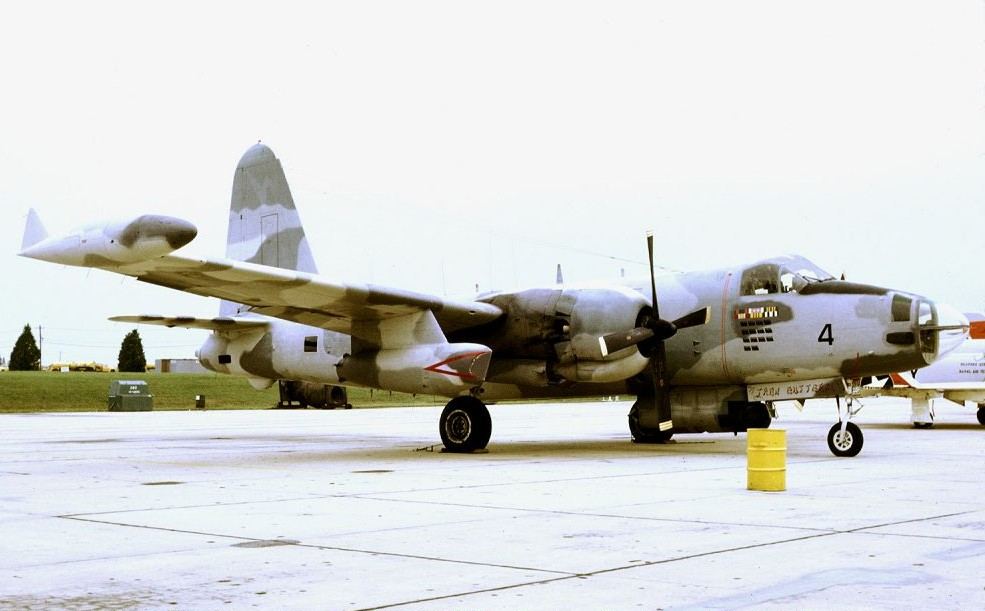
US Navy VAH-21 AP-2H

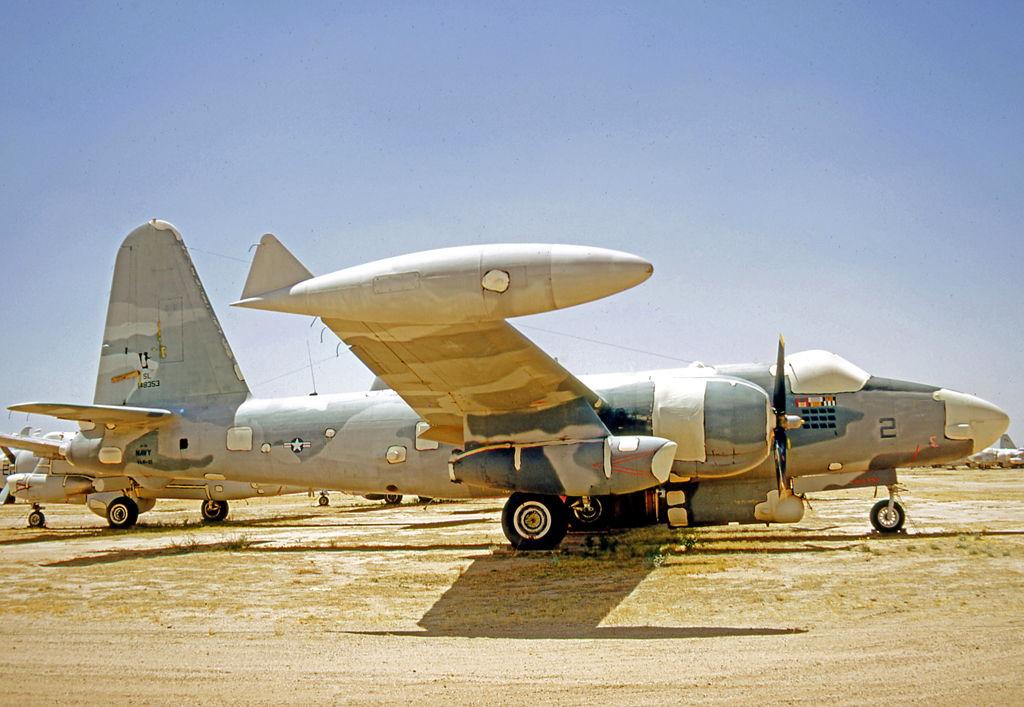
AP-2H of Heavy Attack Squadron VAH-21

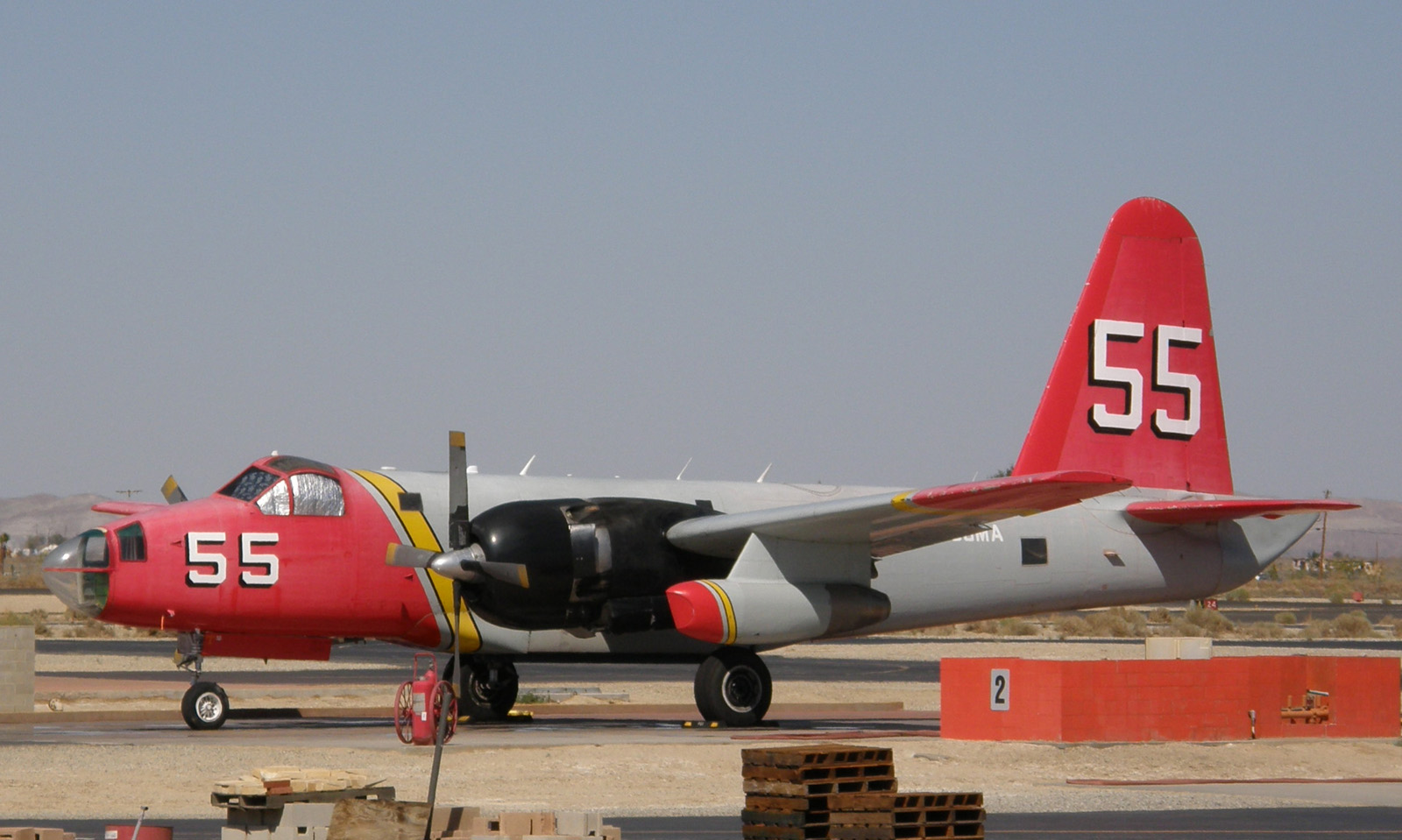
Minden Air's Tanker 55, formerly an SP-2H, at Fox Field

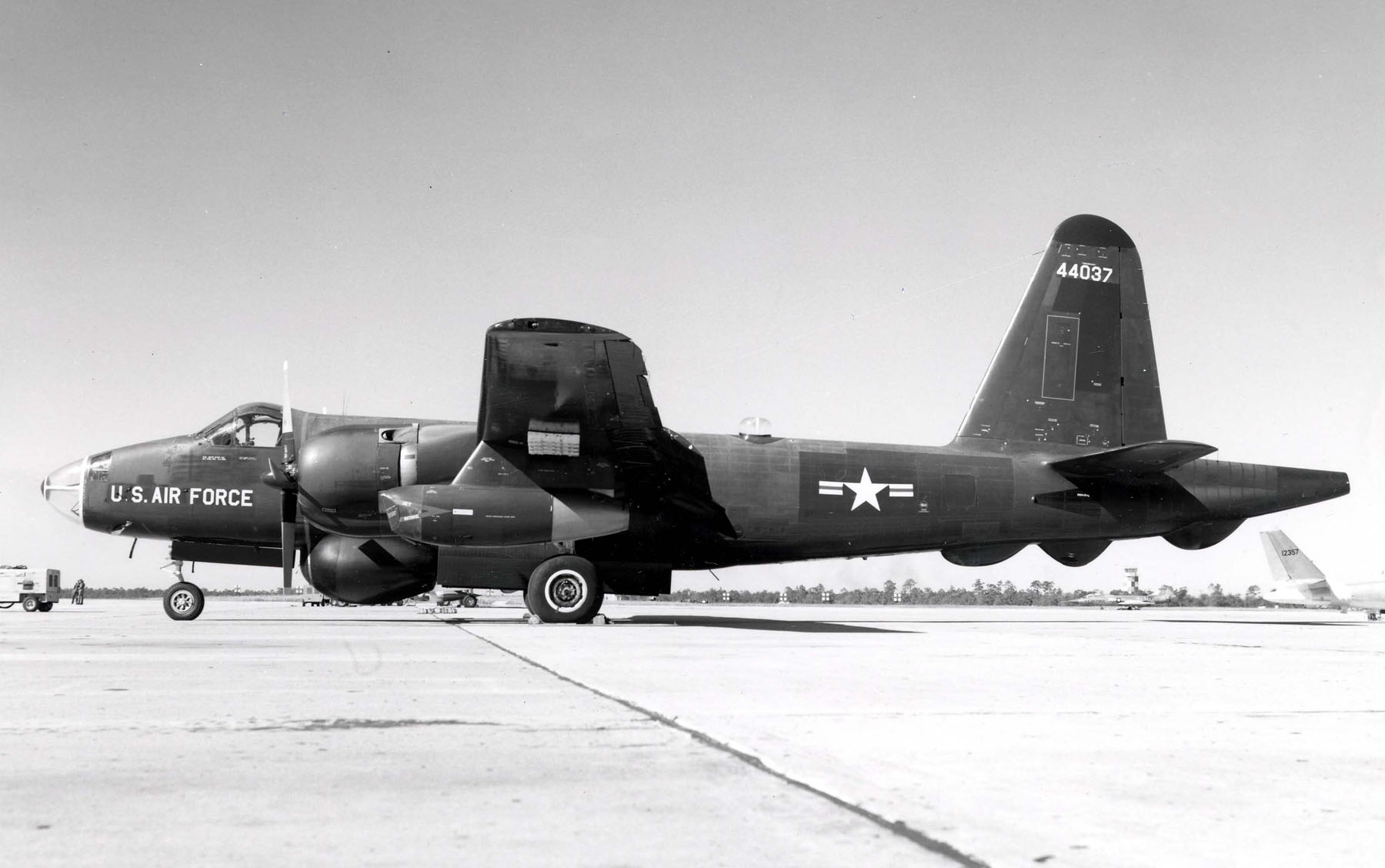
RB-69A of the CIA in USAF markings at Eglin AFB, Florida in 1957.

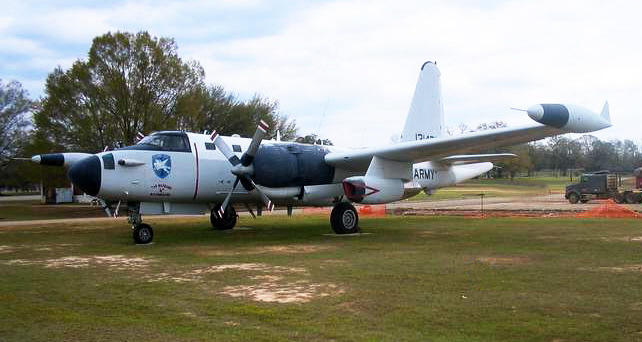
US Army AP-2E also designated RP-2E used in SIGINT/ELINT operations in Vietnam. The Burbank Boomerang is on display at the U.S. Army Aviation Museum at Ft. Novosel, Alabama

Lockheed produced seven main variants of the P2V. In addition, Kawasaki built the turboprop-powered P-2J in Japan.

XP2V-1
Prototype, two built. Powered by two 2,300 horsepower (1,700 kW) Wright R-3350-8 engines with four-bladed propellers, with armament of two .50 in machine guns in nose, tail and dorsal turrets, and 8,000 pounds (3,600 kg) of stores in an internal bomb bay.
P2V-1
First production model with R-3350-8A engine. Provision for 16 5-inch (127 mm) HVAR or 4 11 3/4-inch (300 mm) Tiny Tim rockets underwing; 14 built.
XP2V-2
Fifth production P2V-1 modified as a prototype for P2V-2. Powered by water injected R-3350-24W engines.
P2V-2
Second production model, powered by two 2,800 horsepower (2,100 kW) R-3350-24W engines driving three-bladed propellers. Nose turret replaced by "attack" nose fitted with six fixed 20 mm cannon. First eight aircraft retained Bell tail turret fitted with twin .50 (12.7 mm) machine guns, with remaining aircraft using Emerson tail turret with twin 20 mm cannon. 80 built.
P2V-2N "Polar Bear"
Two P2V-2 modified for polar exploration under Project Ski Jump. Armament removed, with ski landing gear and provision for JATO rockets. Fitted with early MAD gear for magnetic survey purposes. Used for Operation Deep Freeze Antarctic exploration. The specially modified P2Vs had 16-foot (4.9 m) long aluminum skis that were attached to the main landing gear units that when retracted, tucked into fairing just below the engines. This way the modified P2Vs could still land on a regular runway surface.
P2V-2S
One P2V-2 modified as a prototype anti-submarine variant with an AN/APS-20 search radar and additional fuel.
P2V-3
Improved patrol bomber with 3,200 horsepower (2,400 kW) R-3350-26W engines with jet stack engine exhausts. 53 built.
P2V-3B
Conversions from other P2V-3 models, including P2V-3C and −3W, fitted with the ASB-1 Low Level Radar Bombing System; 16 converted. Redesignated as P-2C in 1962.
P2V-3C
Stop-gap carrier based one-way nuclear-armed bomber, not intended to return for a landing on a carrier. Fitted with JATO rocket to aid take-off from carrier and more fuel. Nose guns and dorsal turret removed to save weight. 11 P2V-3s and one P2V-2 modified.
P2V-3W
Airborne Early Warning variant, AN/APS-20 search radar; 30 built.
P2V-3Z
VIP combat transport with armored cabin in rear fuselage with seats for six passengers. Retained tail turret. Two converted from P2V-3s.
P2V-4
Improved anti-submarine aircraft. Fitted with AN/APS-20 search radar and provision for dropping sonobuoys with additional dedicated sonobuoy operator. Underwing tip-tanks added, with searchlight in nose of starboard tip tank. Gun Turrets in tail and dorsal position. First 25 aircraft powered by 3,200 horsepower (2,400 kW) R-3350-26WA engines, with remaining 27 powered by 3,250 horsepower (2,420 kW) Wright R-3350-30W turbo-compound engines. 52 built in total. Surviving aircraft redesignated P-2D in 1962.
P2V-5
Fitted with Emerson nose turret with two 20 mm cannon replacing solid nose of earlier versions, while retaining dorsal and tail turrets. New, larger, jettisonable tip tanks, with traversable searchlight slaved to nose turret in front of starboard tip-tank and AN/APS-8 radar in nose of port tip-tank. AN/APS-20 search radar under fuselage. Later aircraft featured glazed observation nose and MAD gear in place of nose and tail turrets, and revised crew accommodation, with many earlier aircraft refitted. Dorsal turret often removed. 424 built.
P2V-5F
Modification with two 3,250 pounds-force (14.5 kN) J34 jet engines to increase power on take-off, and 3,500 horsepower (2,600 kW) R-3350-32W piston engines. The J34 engines and R-3350 had a common fuel system burning AvGas rather than having dedicated jet fuel (as did all Neptunes with jets except the Kawasaki P-2J). Four underwing rocket pylons removed but increased 10,000 pounds (4,500 kg) weapon load. Redesignated P-2E in 1962.
P2V-5FD
P2V-5F converted for drone launch missions. All weaponry deleted. Redesignated DP-2E in 1962.
P2V-5FE
P2V-5F with additional electronic equipment. Redesignated EP-2E in 1962.
P2V-5FS
P2V-5F with Julie/Jezebel ASW gear, featuring AQA-3 long range acoustic search equipment and Julie explosive echo sounding gear. Redesignated SP-2E in 1962.
P2V-5JF
P2V-5F modified for weather reconnaissance, to include tropical storm/hurricane/typhoon penetrations, with Airborne Early Warning Squadron THREE (VW-3) and Weather Reconnaissance Squadron FOUR (VW-4)
AP-2E
Designation applied to P2V-5F with special SIGINT/ELINT equipment used by the US Army's 1st Radio Research Company at Cam Ranh Bay Air Base. Carrying a crew of up to fifteen, the AP-2E was the heaviest P-2, with a take-off weight of up to 80,000 pounds (36,000 kg). Five converted (also designated RP-2E).
NP-2E
Single P-2E converted as permanent test aircraft.
OP-2E
Modified for use as part of Operation Igloo White for sensor deployment over South-East Asia with Observation Squadron 67 (VO-67). Fitted with terrain avoidance radar in nose, chaff dispensers, wing mounted gun pods and waist guns. 12 converted.
P2V-6
Multi-role version with lengthened weapons bay and provision for aerial minelaying and photo-reconnaissance. Smaller AN/APS-70 radar instead of AN/APS-20. Initially fitted with gun turrets as P2V-5, though retaining the ability to be refitted with glazed nose. A total of 67 were built for the US Navy and France. Redesignated P-2F in 1962.
P2V-6B
Anti-shipping version with provision to carry two AUM-N-2 Petrel anti-ship missiles. 16 built. Later redesignated P2V-6M then MP-2F in 1962.
P2V-6F
P2V-6 refitted with J34 jet engines. Redesignated P-2G in 1962.
P2V-6T
Crew trainer conversion with armament deleted, wingtip tanks often deleted. Redesignated TP-2F in 1962.
P2V-7
Last Neptune variant produced by Lockheed, powered by R-3350-32W and J-34 engines. Fitted with lower drag wingtip tanks, AN/APS-20 search radar in a revised radome and a bulged cockpit canopy. Early aircraft were fitted with defensive gun turrets but these were removed as for the P2V-5. 287 were built, including 48 assembled by Kawasaki in Japan. Redesignated P-2H in 1962.

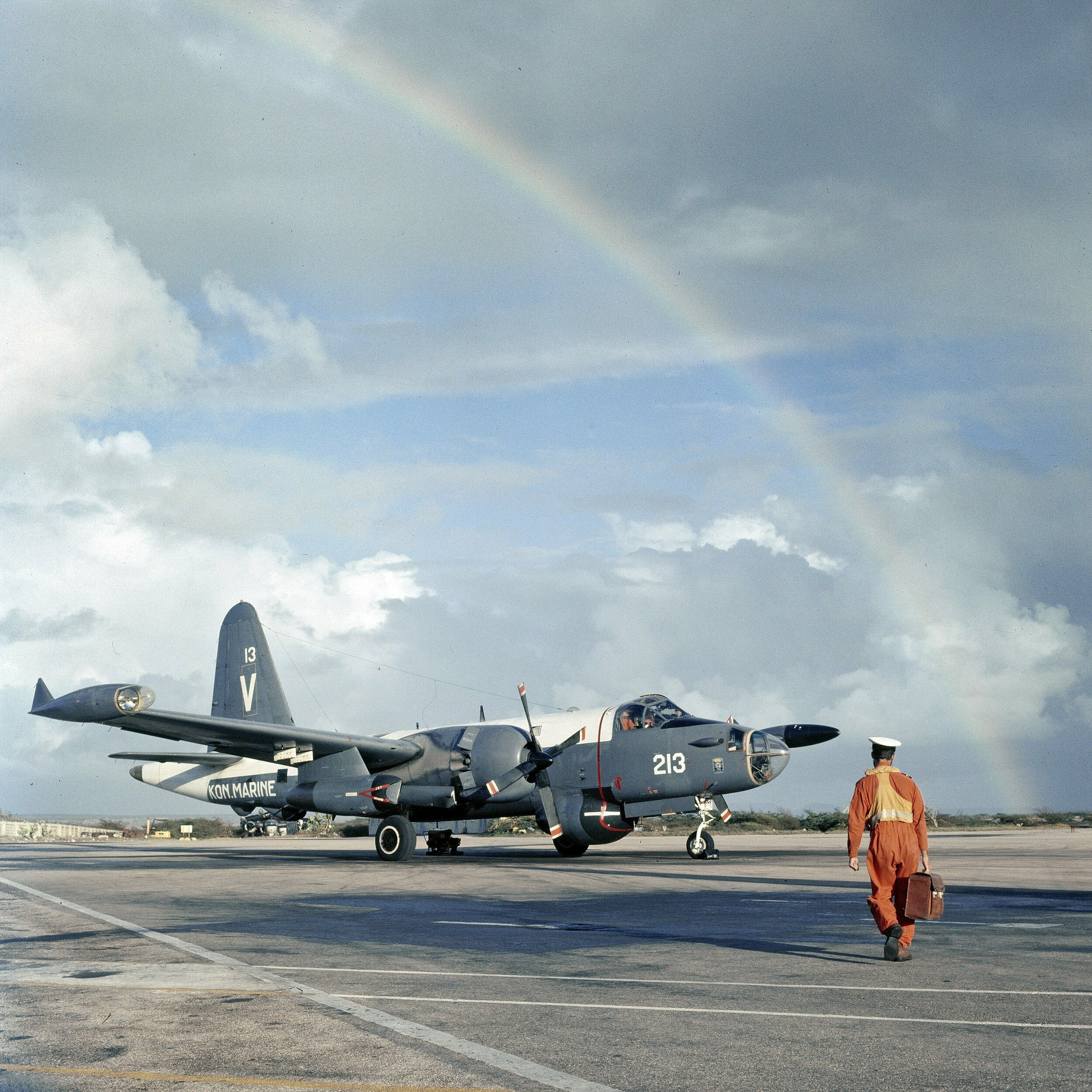
P2V-7B of the Royal Netherlands Navy

P2V-7B
15 aircraft with non-glazed nose fitted with four fixed 20 mm cannon for Royal Netherlands Naval Air Service. Subsequently fitted with glazed nose and modified to SP-2H standard. Supplemented by four SP-2H from France.
P2V-7LP
Four aircraft built with wheel/ski landing gear and JATO gear for Antarctic operations. Redesignated LP-2J in 1962. (No relation to Kawasaki P-2J)
P2V-7S
Additional ASW/ECM equipment including Julie/Jezebel gear. Redesignated SP-2H in 1962.
P2V-7U
Naval designation of the RB-69A variant.
AP-2H
Specialized night and all-weather ground attack variant fitted with FLIR and Low Light TV systems, tail turret, fuselage mounted grenade launchers and downwards firing miniguns. Bombs and napalm carried on underwing pylons. Four converted in 1968 for Heavy Attack Squadron 21 (VAH-21) for operation over South Vietnam.
DP-2H
P-2H converted for drone launch and control.
EP-2H
Single P-2H modified with UHF telemetry equipment instead of ASW systems.
NP-2H
Testbed conversion of P2V-H.
RB-69A
Five new built and two converted from P2V-7s for CIA covert operations, obtained with USAF help and operated by ROCAF 34th Squadron. Aerial reconnaissance/ELINT platform, modular sensor packages fitted depended on the mission needs. Originally fitted with Westinghouse APQ-56 Side Looking Airborne Radar (SLAR), the APQ-24 search radar, the Fairchild Mark IIIA cameras, the APR-9/13 radar intercept receiver, the QRC-15 DF system, the APA-69A DF display, the APA-74 pulse analyser, the Ampex tape recorder, the System 3 receiver to intercept enemy communications, the APS-54 RWR, a noise jammer, the RADAN system doppler radar navigation, and others. In May 1959, an upgrade program known as Phase VI was approved, and added the ATIR air-to-air radar jammer, replacing APR-9/13 with ALQ-28 ferret system, the QRC-15, 3 14-channel recorders and 1 7-channel high speed recorder to record ELINT systems, the K-band receiver, the ASN-7 navigation computer replacing RADAN, and Fulton Skyhook system.
Neptune MR.1
British designation of P2V-5; 52 delivered.
CP-122 Neptune
RCAF designation of P2V-7.(jet pod not initially fitted to 25 P2V-7 aircraft delivered to RCAF, but subsequently retrofitted)
P-15
Brazilian Air Force designation of the P-2E.
Kawasaki P-2J (P2V-Kai)
Japanese variant produced by Kawasaki for JMSDF with T64 turboprop engines, various other improvements; 82 built.

Production numbers
Aircraft	Number
P2V-1	14
P2V-2	80
P2V-3	53
P2V-3W	30
P2V-4	52
P2V-5	424
P2V-6/P-2F	67
P2V-6B	16
P2V-7/P-2H	287
P2V-7B	15
RB-69A	5
Neptune MR.1	52
P-2J	82

== Operators ==
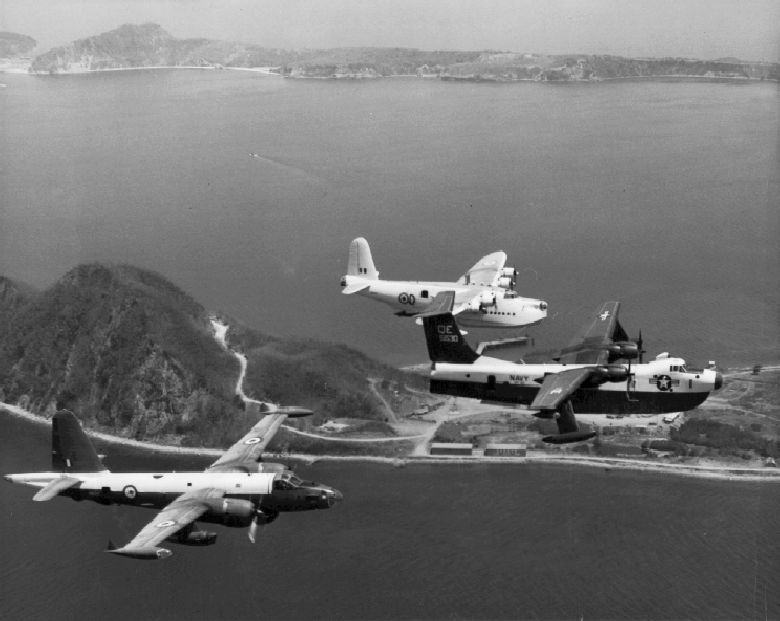
A RAAF SP-2H with a USN P-5 and a RNZAF Sunderland in 1963

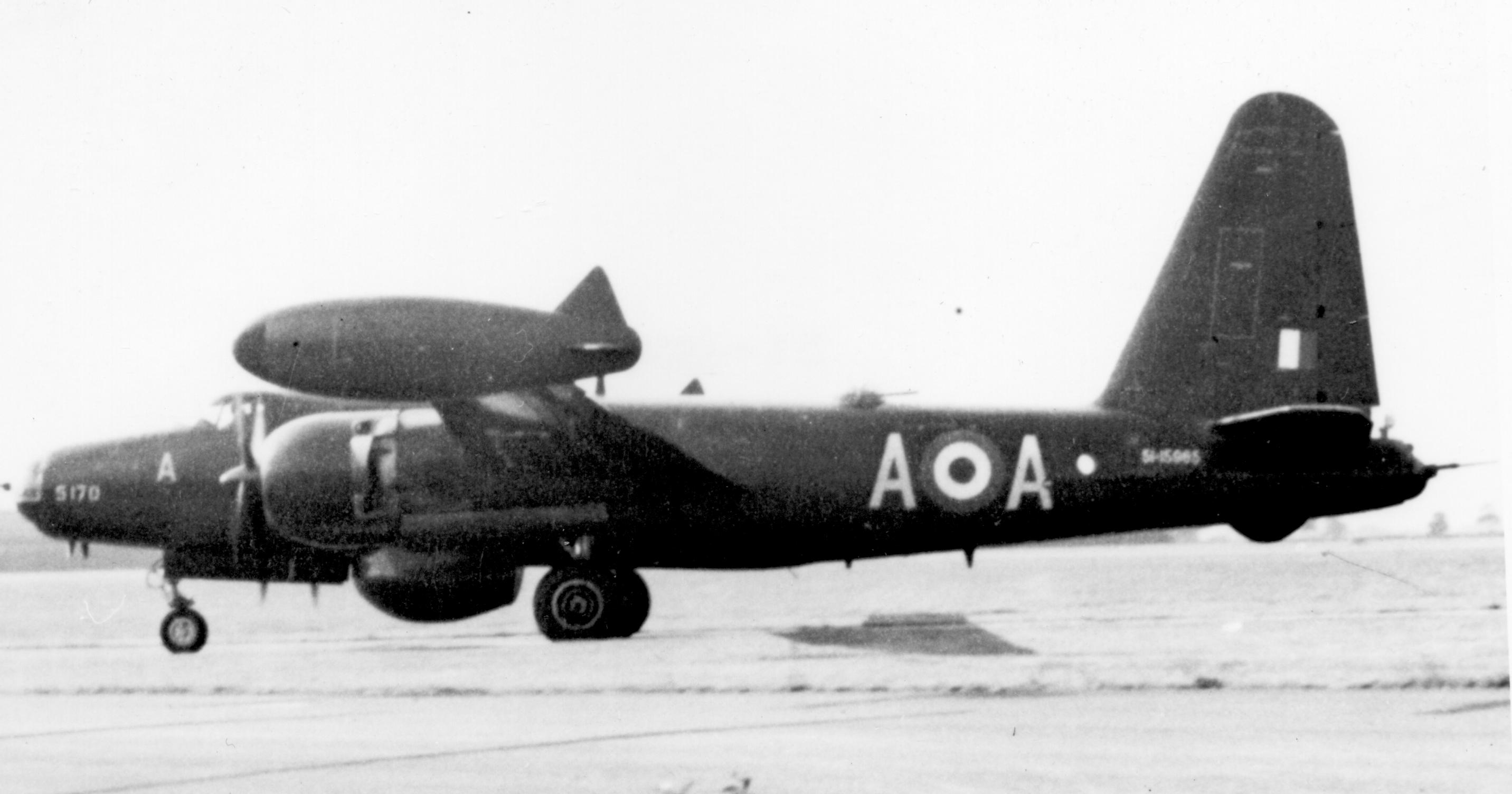
A Neptune MR.1 of 217 Sqn Coastal Command RAF in 1953

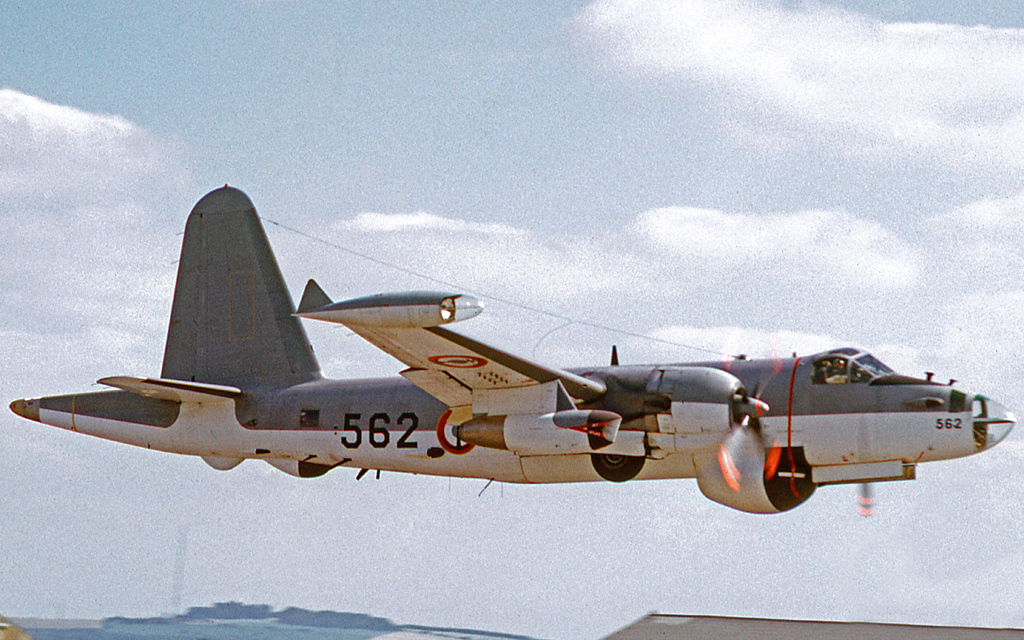
SP-2H Neptune of Flotille 25 Aeronavale, French Navy, in 1973

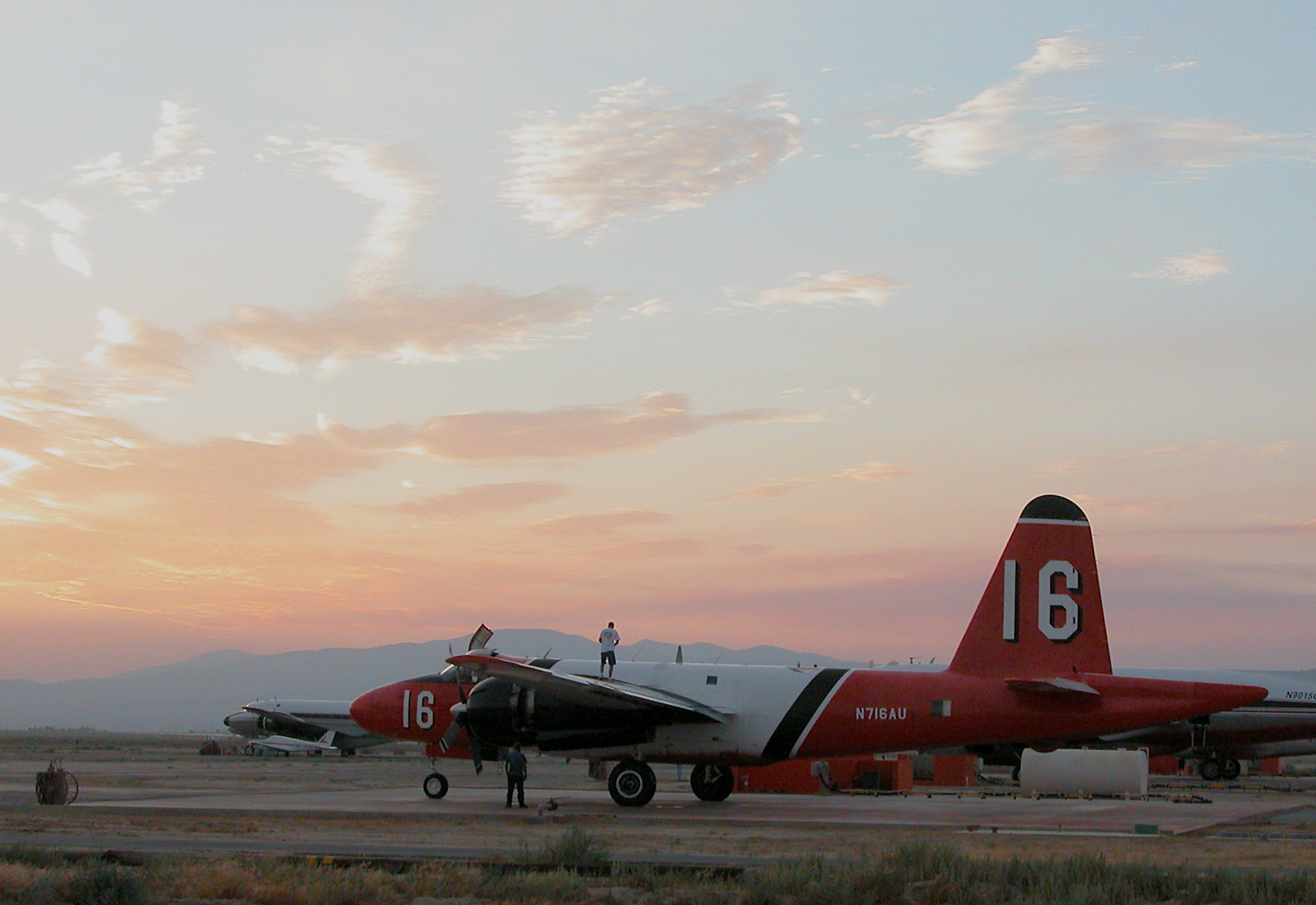
Aero Union P-2 Tanker 16 at Fox Field in 2003, without jet engines

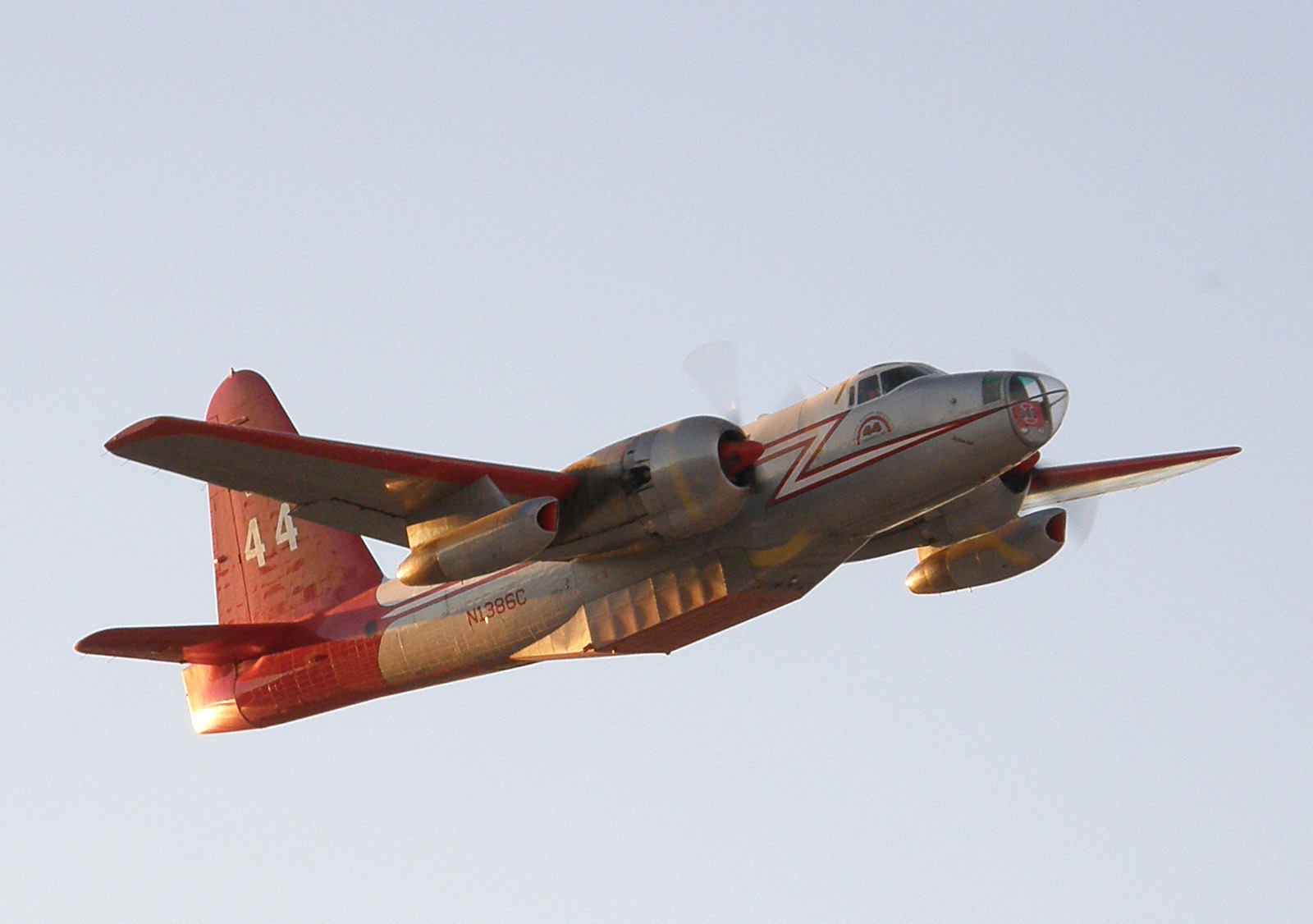
Neptune Aviation Services' Tanker 44 takes off from Fox Field to fight the California wildfires of October 2007

=== Military operators ===
Argentina

- Argentine Navy – Argentine Naval Aviation (16 units)
  - Escuadrilla Aeronaval de Exploracion

Australia

- Royal Australian Air Force
  - No. 10 Squadron RAAF
  - No. 11 Squadron RAAF

Brazil

- Brazilian Air Force (14 units)
  - 1°/7° Grupo de Aviação

Canada

- Royal Canadian Air Force
  - No. 404 Squadron RCAF
  - No. 405 Squadron RCAF
  - No. 407 Squadron RCAF

France

- French Naval Aviation
  - 21F Flottilla (P2V-6) BAN Nîmes-Garons
  - 22F Flottilla (P2V-6) BAN Nîmes-Garons
  - 23F Flottilla (P2V-6) (P2V-7) BAN Lann-Bihoué
  - 24F Flottilla (P2V-7) BAN Lann-Bihoué
  - 25F Flottilla (P2V-7) BAN Lann-Bihoué
  - 8S Escadrille (P2V-6) Base aérienne 185 Hao
  - 9S Escadrille (P2V-7) BAN Tontouta
  - 12S Escadrille (P2V-7) Base aérienne 185 Hao

Japan

- Japan Maritime Self-Defense Force
  - Air Patrol Squadron 3 (JMSDF)
  - Air Patrol Squadron 2 (JMSDF)
  - Air Development Squadron 51 (JMSDF)

Netherlands

- Dutch Naval Aviation Service

Portugal

- Portuguese Air Force (12 units)
  - Esquadra 61, Montijo Air Base
  - Detachment 61, Bissalanca Air Base (Portuguese Guinea) and Sal Air Base (Cape Verde)
  - Detachment 62, Luanda Air Base (Angola)
  - Detachment 63, Beira Air Base (Mozambique)

Republic of China

- Republic of China Air Force
  - 34th Black Bat Squadron

United Kingdom

- Royal Air Force
  - No. 36 Squadron RAF
  - No. 203 Squadron RAF
  - No. 210 Squadron RAF
  - No. 217 Squadron RAF
  - No. 236 Operational Conversion Unit RAF

United States

- United States Army
- United States Marine Corps
- United States Navy
- Central Intelligence Agency operated seven RB-69A in USAF colors.

=== Civilian operators ===
- Aero Union

== Accidents and incidents ==
- On 27 November 1950 a P2V-2 crashed while conducting a test run with rockets near Kaena Point in Hawaii. The starboard wing separated from the aircraft. The crew of five died on impact.
- On 6 November 1951, a P2V of VP-6 carrying out a weather reconnaissance mission over international waters off Vladivostok was attacked and shot down by a number of MiG-15s. All ten crew were killed. (Note: During the Korean War, the US Navy operated a number of specially equipped Lockheed P2V Neptune's flying ELINT sorties against the Soviet Union...)
- On 5 January 1952, a Lockheed P2V-2 Neptune (122443) operated by the United States Navy undershot the runway at RAF Burtonwood and collided with a USAF Douglas C-47 (42-100912). One crew member on the Neptune and six others on the C-47 were killed. Fifteen others were injured, eleven on the Neptune and four on the C-47.
- On 18 January 1953, a P2V of VP-22 was shot down off Swatow in the Formosa Straits by Chinese anti-aircraft fire. Eleven of thirteen crewmen were rescued by a US Coast Guard PBM-5 under fire from shore batteries on Nan Ao Tao island. Attempting to takeoff in 8 to 12-foot swell, the PBM crashed. Ten survivors out of nineteen total (including five from the P2V) were rescued by USS Halsey Powell. During the search effort, a PBM-5 from VP-40 received fire from a small-caliber machine gun, and USS Gregory received fire from shore batteries. (Note: P2V-5 shot down by Chinese antiaircraft fire near Swatow.)
- On 17 December 1953, P2V-5 Neptune S/N (BUN 12388) of VP-3 with a nine men crew, disappeared on a patrol flight from Keflavík Airport, an airfield near Iceland capital of Reykjavík. The Neptune took off from Keflavík at 2 pm. Thursday for routine patrol over North Atlantic waters. It was circling back through a storm toward that base when it radioed its last position. The wreck was sighted on Mýrdalsjökull glacier and at least three of the nine men crew were initially reported alive. A United States air rescue plane spotted the wreckage, which was described as "badly broken up". Helicopter lift recovered one body, but bodies of 8 men remain in the frozen wreck until spring (1954). On 14 October 1982, the remains of American crewmen was found 28 years after the crash into the glacier. The wreck was discovered by farmers rounding up sheep, apparently the glacier movement uncovered the wreck. The crew was LT Henry Cason, LT Ishmuel M. Blum, ENS Sven Shieff, AD2 Eddie L. Cater, AN Everett Humbert, AT3 Amos W. Jones, AL2 Robert B. Whale, AO3 Marvin L Baker, ATAN William A. Ward.
- On 4 September 1954, a P2V-5 of VP-19 operating from NAS Atsugi ditched in the Sea of Japan, 40 miles (64 km) off the coast of Siberia after an attack by two Soviet Air Forces MiG-15s. One crewmen was killed, and the other nine were rescued by a USAF SA-16 Grumman Albatross amphibian.
- On 22 June 1955, a P2V-5 of VP-9, flying a patrol mission from NAS Kodiak, Alaska, was attacked over the Bering Straits by two Soviet Air Forces MiG-15s. The P2V crash-landed on St. Lawrence Island after an engine was set afire. Of the eleven crew members, four sustained injuries due to gunfire and six were injured during the landing. The US government demanded $724,947 in compensation; the USSR finally paid half this amount. (Note: USN P2V-5 Neptune of VP-9) (Note: (This was the only incident in which the Soviet Union admitted any responsibility.))
- On 26 September 1955, a P2V-3W (131442), callsign Snowcloud Five, was lost south of Jamaica while attempting to penetrate the center of Hurricane Janet with nine crew and two journalists aboard; despite an extensive search and rescue effort over the next five days involving 3,000 personnel, 60 aircraft, and seven ships, no trace of the aircraft or its occupants was ever found. This remains the only loss of a reconnaissance aircraft during penetration of an Atlantic hurricane. The cause of the crash is unknown, although theories include an incorrect altimeter reading due the low barometric pressure in the hurricane and increased workload due to one of the usual crew members having been replaced by a reporter causing the crew to lose track of their height above the sea.
- On 10 October 1956, a P2V-5 of No. 36 Squadron RAF (WX545) crashed into the side of Beinn na Lice, Mull of Kintyre, southwest Scotland, killing all nine crew members. WX545 was returning from an anti-submarine exercise off Derry, Northern Ireland to its base at RAF Topcliffe in North Yorkshire, England. Beinn na Lice was hidden by fog, and a member of 36 Squadron alleges that the aircraft in the exercise had been ordered not to use radar in inshore waters.
- On 12 April 1957, a P2V-5F of VP-26 crashed on takeoff during a short takeoff practice exercise at NAS Brunswick, Maine. The apparent cause was a runaway varicam elevator control, which caused a hammerhead stall at very low altitude. The aircraft did an overhead loop, reversing its direction, but crashed into the woods near the departure end of the runway next to the base golf course. There were no survivors.
- On 21 July 1957, a US Navy Neptune searching for a sister P2V Neptune crashed near Mount Pra, Italy, near the French border, killing nine airmen. The other P2V for had disappeared two days earlier, 19 July, with 11 on board on a flight from Casablanca to Treviso.
- On 1 February 1958, USAF C-118A 53-3277 collided in mid-air with a US Navy Lockheed P2V Neptune 127723 over Norwalk, California, killing 47 of 49 on board both aircraft and 1 person on the ground.
- On 4 February 1959, RAAF A89-308 crashed at RAAF Richmond, NSW, Australia. All eight crew died. The port engine began to disintegrate, causing a fuel leak in the wheel well. The resulting fire severed the magnesium wing spar, and the aircraft fell from the sky before the crew could bail out.
- On 25 March 1960, an ROCAF RB-69A/P2V-7U (7101/140442/54-4040) crashed into a hill near Kunsan Air Base, South Korea, during a low-level ferry flight from Hsinchu, Taiwan to a staging area in Kunsan, South Korea. All 14 aircrew on board were killed.
- On 6 November 1961, an ROCAF RB-69A/P2V-7U (7099/140440/54-4039) conducting a low-level penetration flight over mainland China was shot down by ground fire over Liaodong peninsula. All 14 aircrew on board were killed in action.
- On 9 November 1961, an P2V-7LP of VX-6 crashed on takeoff from Wilkes Station, Antarctica, where it had refuelled en route to McMurdo Station. Four aircrew and one passenger were killed, with four aircrew surviving.
- On 8 January 1962, a ROCAF RB-69A/P2V-7U(7097/140438/54-4038) crashed into the Korea Bay while conducting ELINT and leaflet dropping missions. All 14 aircrew on board were killed in action.
- On 12 January 1962, a P2V-5 (designation LA-9) of VP-5 flew off course during a patrol over the Denmark Strait and crashed on the Kronborg Glacier in eastern Greenland. All 12 crew were killed. The wreckage was discovered by a party of British geologists in 1966.
- On 19 June 1963, an ROCAF RB-69A/P2V-7U (7105/141233/54-4041) was conducting an ELINT mission over mainland China, and was shot down by PLAAF MiG-17PF over Linchuan, Jiangxi, after being intercepted repeatedly by multiple MiG-17PFs and Tu-4Ps. All 14 aircrew on board were killed in action.
- On 11 June 1964, a RB-69A/P2V-7U (7047/135612/54-4037) was conducting an ELINT mission over mainland China and was shot down by a PLAN-AF MiG-15 over Shandong peninsula after being intercepted by MiG-15s and Il-28s. All 13 aircrew on board were killed in action.
- On 22 January 1965, an RCAF P2V-7 #24115 crashed short of the runway at CFB Summerside, Prince Edward Island, when it ran out of battery power to run the fuel pumps to the J-34 jet engines. The aircraft had lost one reciprocating engine, and the generator failed on the other. Also, because Canadian Neptunes had no other generators, these failures led to the loss of all thrust and the subsequent crash.
- On 22 January 1965, just before midnight, an MLD SP-2H (212) was taken from Vliegkamp Valkenburg, near The Hague, by two young aircraft mechanics lacking any flying experience. They managed to get the plane airborne, but stalled shortly after takeoff. It crashed into the North Sea, a few hundred metres offshore of the fishing town of Katwijk. The investigation report concluded that it was a drunken prank.
- On 3 December 1967, a Lockheed P-2E aircraft departed Naval Air Station Brunswick for a routine patrol flight. At some point, the aircraft developed mechanical problems and received clearance to land at Otis Air Force Base. As the aircraft was making its final approach, it crashed a half mile short of the runway. All twelve men aboard escaped; four of them suffered minor injuries.
- On 4 February 1970 at 4:39 a.m, French Navy Lockheed P2V7 Neptune No. 147571 of Flotilla 25F crashed after takeoff, killing all 12 crew members.
- On 15 January 1971, French Navy Lockheed P2V7 Neptune No. 147564 of Flottilla 25F crashed at the start of runway 26 on the Lann-Bihoué naval aeronautics base, in the final phase of a landing in foggy weather, killing 6 of the 10 crew.
- On 15 September 1976, an Argentine Navy Lockheed Neptune aircraft flew on a reconnaissance mission from Rio Gallegos to survey the sea ice conditions in Drake Passage at the beginning of the summer navigation season. The plane crashed in poor weather on the then-uninhabited Livingston Island, Antarctica, killing all 10 aircrew and a civilian television cameraman.
- On 5 September 2008, a Neptune Aviation Services Lockheed Neptune, registered N4235T, crashed soon after takeoff from Reno/Stead Airport, Reno, Nevada. The left engine and then left wing were seen to catch fire before the aircraft crashed. All three crew members on board were killed.
- On 3 June 2012, while engaged in firefighting operations in Utah, a Neptune Aviation Services Lockheed Neptune, registered N14447, crashed. Two crew members were killed.

== Surviving aircraft ==
There are a few Neptunes that have been restored and are on display in museums and parks.

=== Argentina ===
On display

SP-2H

- 2-P-112 – Museo Aeronaval (MUAN) of Argentine Naval Aviation. This is the Neptune that tracked HMS Sheffield.

=== Australia ===
Airworthy

SP-2H

- 149073 – Historical Aircraft Restoration Society, Illawarra Regional Airport, New South Wales, Australia. Ex A89-273 of No. 10 Squadron RAAF, now civil registered VH-IOY.
- 147566 – Historical Aircraft Restoration Society, Illawarra Regional Airport, New South Wales, Australia. Delivered to French Aeronavale, assigned to Escadrille 12 last based in Tahiti. Currently displaying French Aeronavale colours, now civil registered VH-LRR.

On Display

SP-2H

- 149075 – RAAF Museum, Point Cook, Victoria. Ex A89-275 of No. 10 Squadron RAAF
- 149077 – Queensland Air Museum, Caloundra. Ex A89-277 of No. 10 Squadron RAAF
- 149080 – RAAF Base Townsville entrance, owned by RAAF Museum. Ex A89-280 of No. 10 Squadron RAAF.
- 149081 – Historical Aircraft Restoration Society, Illawarra Regional Airport, New South Wales. Ex A89-281 of No. 10 Squadron RAAF.

In Storage

SP-2H

- 133640 – RAAF Museum, Point Cook, Victoria. Ex A89-302 of No. 11 Squadron RAAF, KU o o in storage for RAAF Museum.
- 145921 – Registered to Valerio, located in Cunderdin, Western Australia, ex-USN, imported into Australia November 1988, converted to firefighting tanker, civil registered VH-NEP.

Under Restoration

SP-2E

- 133640 – Historic Aircraft Restoration Society, Parkes Airport, New South Wales, Australia. Ex A89-302 of No. 11 Squadron RAAF. The oldest Neptune in Australia, it was gifted by the RAAF Museum in 2018, for static restoration.

SP-2H

- 149072 – Historic Aircraft Restoration Society, Parkes Airport, New South Wales, Australia. Ex A89-272 of No. 10 Squadron RAAF. Donated to HARS by RAAF in February 2016 for restoration and display at the HARS Parkes satellite facility.

Brazil

On display

P2V-5

- FAB7009 – Brazilian Air Force on display at the Salvador Air Force Base in Salvador.
- FAB7010 – Brazilian Air Force on display at the Museu Aeroespacial in Rio de Janeiro.

=== Canada ===
On display

EP-2H

- 147969 – Greenwood Military Aviation Museum in Nova Scotia, Canada.

=== Chile ===
Under restoration

SP-2H

- 147967 – To be displayed is the Neptune /Firestar registered CC-CHU of Heliworks Ltda. Currently dismantled in Concepción/Carriel Sur airport, N703AU/Tanker 03's incorporation into Chile's Museo Nacional Aeronáutico y del Espacio collection at the former Los Cerrillos airport in Santiago, was announced during the ceremony of the 69th Anniversary of Museum on 4 July 2013.

=== France ===
On Display

P2V-7

- 334 - Musée de l'air et de l'espace in Paris-Le Bourget Airport

In Storage

P2V-7

- 335 - in the Musée de l'air et de l'espace reserve in Dugny
- 563 - To be retrieved by the Musée de l'air et de l'espace in Paris-Le Bourget Airport. Currently stored on an old airbase in Brienne-le-Château, Aube department

=== Netherlands ===
On display

SP-2H

- 201 – on display outside at the Nationaal Militair Museum, Soesterberg.
- 210 - on display outside at Aviodrome Lelystad AirPort. This aircraft was donated to KLM engineering & maintenance for training purposes and was painted in KLM colors. Afterwards transported by barge to Aviodrome and now in partial Dark Sea grey color.
- 216 – gate guardian at the former naval airbase Valkenburg, after closing it was moved to naval airbase De Kooy near Den Helder, The Netherlands.

=== Portugal ===
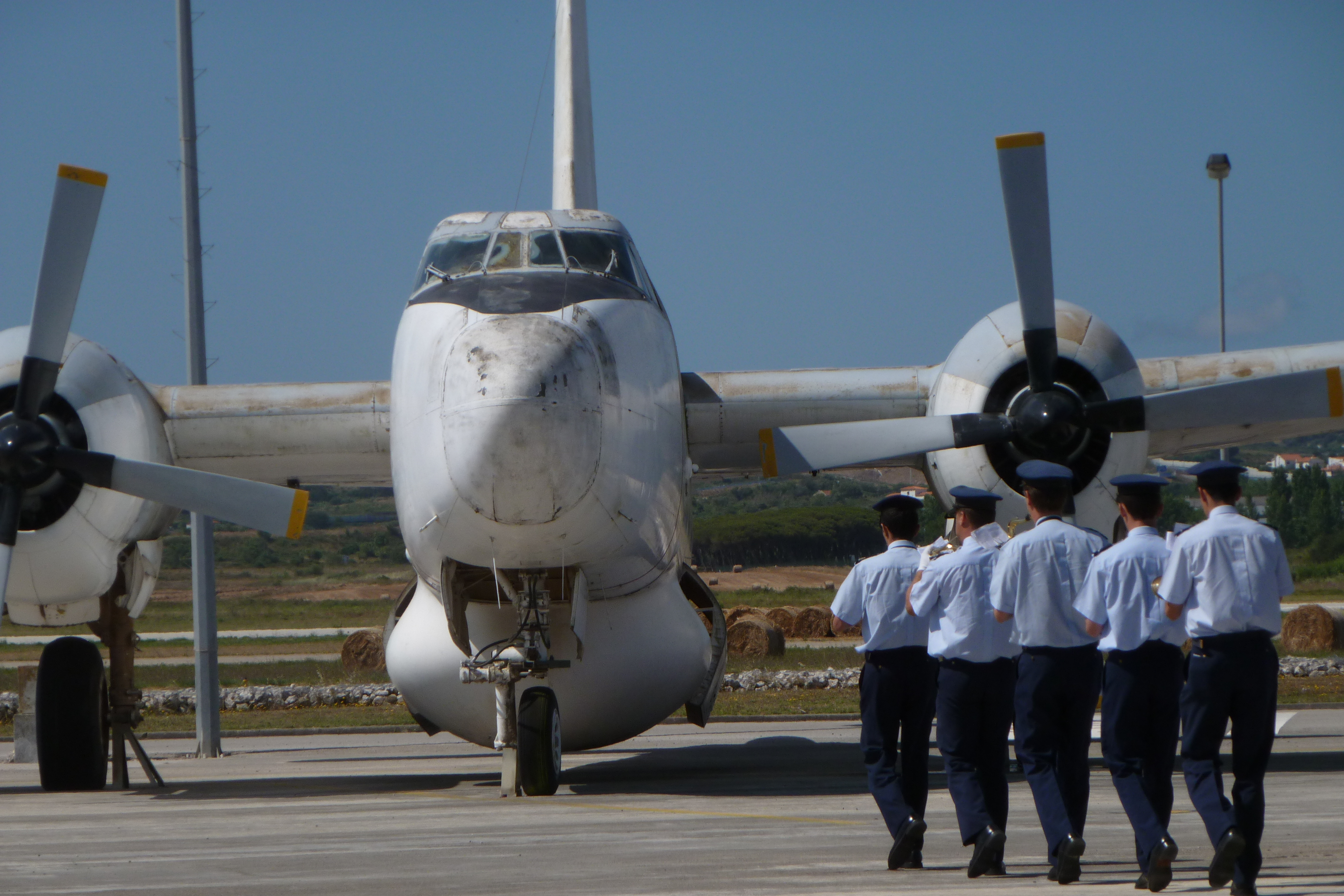
Ex-Portuguese Air Force P2V on display at the Museu do Ar in Sintra.

On display

P2V

- 4711 – Museu do Ar, Sintra.

=== United Kingdom ===
On display

P-2H

- 204 – Royal Air Force Museum Cosford. former Royal Netherlands Navy, last airworthy airframe donated to the UK in 1982 after arrival of the first P-3c in the Royal Netherlands Navy.

=== United States ===
Airworthy

P2V-7/P-2H

- 148360 – Erickson Aircraft Collection in Madras, Oregon

P2V-7S/SP-2H

- 145915 – Mid-Atlantic Air Museum in Reading, Pennsylvania.

On display

P2V-1

- 89082 Truculent Turtle – National Museum of Naval Aviation, NAS Pensacola, Florida.

P2V-5F/P-2E

- 128392 – NAS Brunswick main gate, former NAS Brunswick, Maine.
- 131410 – NAS Jacksonville Memorial Park, NAS Jacksonville, Florida.
- 131424 – Estrella Warbirds Museum in Paso Robles, California.

P2V-5FS/AP-2E

- 131485 – United States Army Aviation Museum at Fort Rucker, Alabama

P2V-5FS/SP-2E

- 128402 – Pueblo Weisbrod Aircraft Museum in Pueblo, Colorado.

P2V-5/SP-2E

- 128402 – On static display at Moffett Field Museum, Moffett Federal Airfield (former NAS Moffett Field), California.
- 131445 – Tanker 61 Memorial at the Crater Lake–Klamath Regional Airport in Klamath Falls, Oregon.
- 131459 – Dawson Community Airport in Glendive, Montana.

P2V-7/P-2H

- 140443 – Yankee Air Museum in Belleville, Michigan
- 147957 – Pima Air and Space Museum, adjacent to Davis-Monthan AFB in Tucson, Arizona.
- 147966 – South Georgia Technical College in Americus, Georgia.
- 147968 – Chico Air Museum in Chico, California.

P2V-7S/AP-2H

- 135620 – Pima Air and Space Museum adjacent to Davis-Monthan AFB in Tucson, Arizona.

P2V-7S/SP-2H

- 141234 – National Museum of Naval Aviation in NAS Pensacola, Florida.
- 145906 – Gillespie Field Annex of the San Diego Air & Space Museum in San Diego, California.
- 147954 – Museum of Aviation at Robins AFB, Georgia. The P-2 Neptune is painted to represent a USAF/CIA/Taiwan RB-69A.
- 150279 – Gate guard at the Marine Corps Base Hawaii (former MCAS Kaneohe Bay), Hawaii. Relocated from former NAS Barbers Point, Hawaii in 1998 following that base's closure due to BRAC action.

Under restoration or in storage

P2V-5

- 128422 – in storage by Neptune Aviation Services in Missoula, Montana.

P2V-5F/P-2E

- 131502 – in storage by Premier Jets in Hillsboro, Oregon.
- 131482 – in storage by Neptune Aviation Services in Missoula, Montana.

P2V-5FS/SP-2E

- 131542 – for static display by the Historic Aircraft Restoration Project at former NAS New York / Floyd Bennett Field in Brooklyn, New York.

P2V-7/P-2H

- 140154 – in storage by the Museum of Flight and Aerial Firefighting in Greybull, Wyoming.
- 140972 – in storage by Neptune Aviation Services in Missoula, Montana.
- 147949 – in storage by Neptune Aviation Services in Missoula, Montana.
- 148341 – in storage by Neptune Aviation Services in Missoula, Montana.
- 148346 – in storage by Neptune Aviation Services in Missoula, Montana.
- 148356 – in storage by Neptune Aviation Services in Missoula, Montana.
- 148359 – in storage by Neptune Aviation Services in Missoula, Montana.
- 148362 – in storage by Neptune Aviation Services in Missoula, Montana.

P2V-7S/SP-2H

- 147965 – in storage by Neptune Aviation Services in Missoula, Montana.
- 148339 – in storage by Neptune Aviation Services in Missoula, Montana.

== Specifications (P-2H / P2V-7) ==
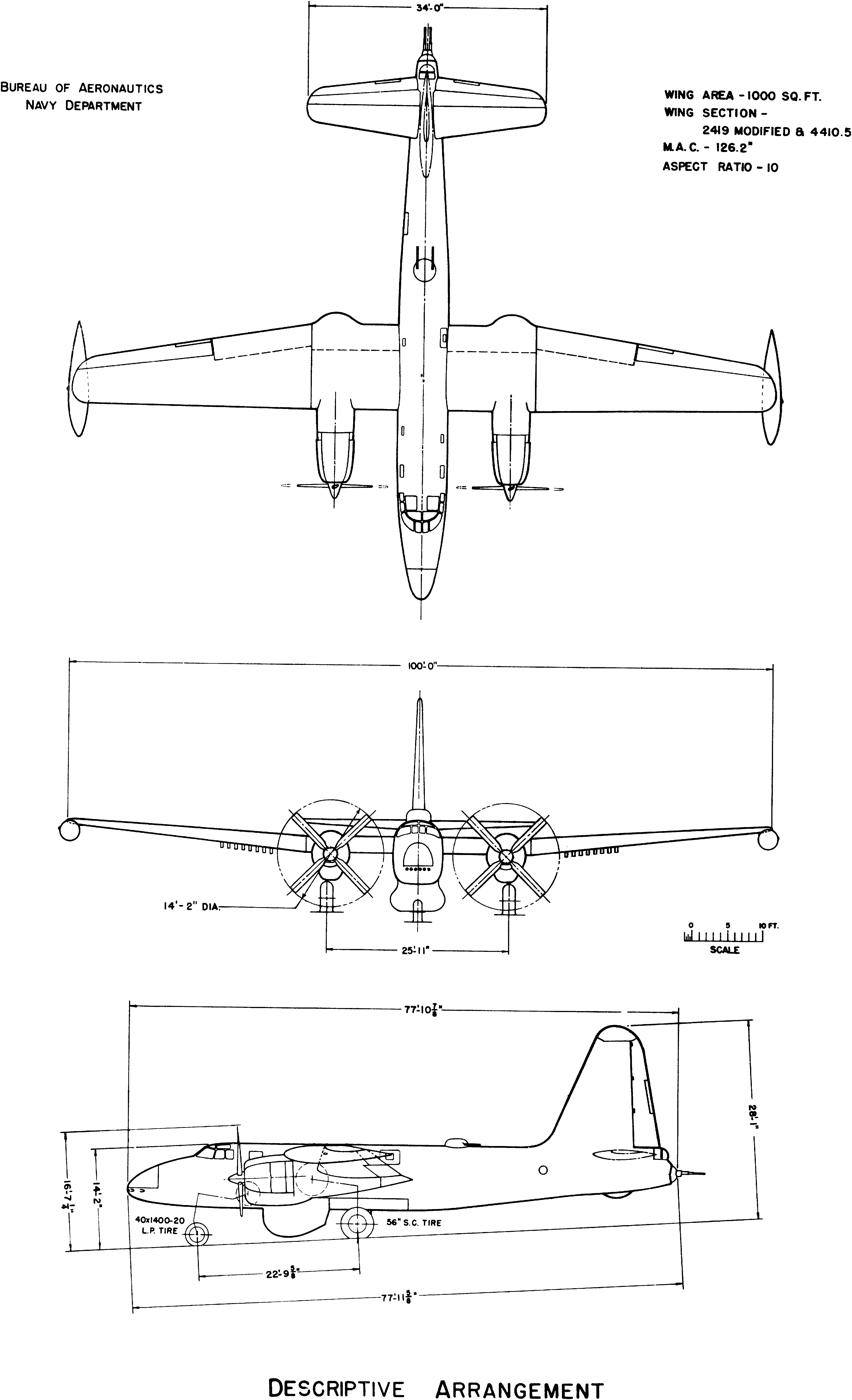
3-view line drawing of the Lockheed P2V-4 Neptune

Data from Combat Aircraft since 1945

General characteristics

- Crew: 7-9
- Length: 91 ft 8 in (27.94 m)
- Wingspan: 103 ft 10 in (31.65 m)
- Height: 29 ft 4 in (8.94 m)
- Wing area: 1,000 sq ft (93 m^{2})
- Airfoil: root: NACA 2419 mod; tip: NACA 4410.5
- Empty weight: 49,935 lb (22,650 kg)
- Max takeoff weight: 79,895 lb (36,240 kg)
- Powerplant: 2 × Wright R-3350-32W Duplex-Cyclone 18-cylinder air-cooled radial piston engine, 3,700 hp (2,800 kW) each turbo-compound with water injection
- Powerplant: 2 × Westinghouse J34-WE-34 turbojet engines, 3,400 lbf (15 kN) thrust each pylon mounted
- Propellers: 4-bladed constant-speed propellers

Performance

- Maximum speed: 363 mph (584 km/h, 315 kn)
- Cruise speed: 207 mph (333 km/h, 180 kn)
- Range: 2,157 mi (3,471 km, 1,874 nmi)
- Service ceiling: 22,400 ft (6,800 m)

Armament

- Rockets: 2.75 in (70 mm) FFAR in removable wing-mounted pods
- Bombs: 8,000 lb (3,629 kg) including free-fall bombs, depth charges, and torpedoes

== See also ==
- Neptune Mission, a 1958 Canadian short documentary about a Neptune anti-submarine mission

Related development

- Kawasaki P-2J

Aircraft of comparable role, configuration, and era

- Avro Shackleton
- Beriev Be-12
- Breguet Atlantique
- Canadair Argus
- Consolidated PB4Y-2 Privateer
- Ilyushin Il-38
- Martin P4M Mercator

Related lists

- List of Lockheed aircraft
- List of military aircraft of the United States
- List of US (naval) patrol aircraft
- List of non-carrier aircraft flown from aircraft carriers
