= VAH-21 =

Heavy Attack Squadron 21
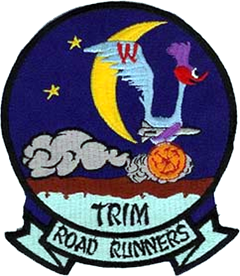
- VAH-21 patch
- Active: 1 September 1968 – 16 June 1969
- Country: United States
- Branch: United States Navy
- Role: Attack
- Part of: Inactive
- Nickname(s): Roadrunners
- Engagements: Vietnam War

Aircraft flown
- Attack: AP-2H Neptune

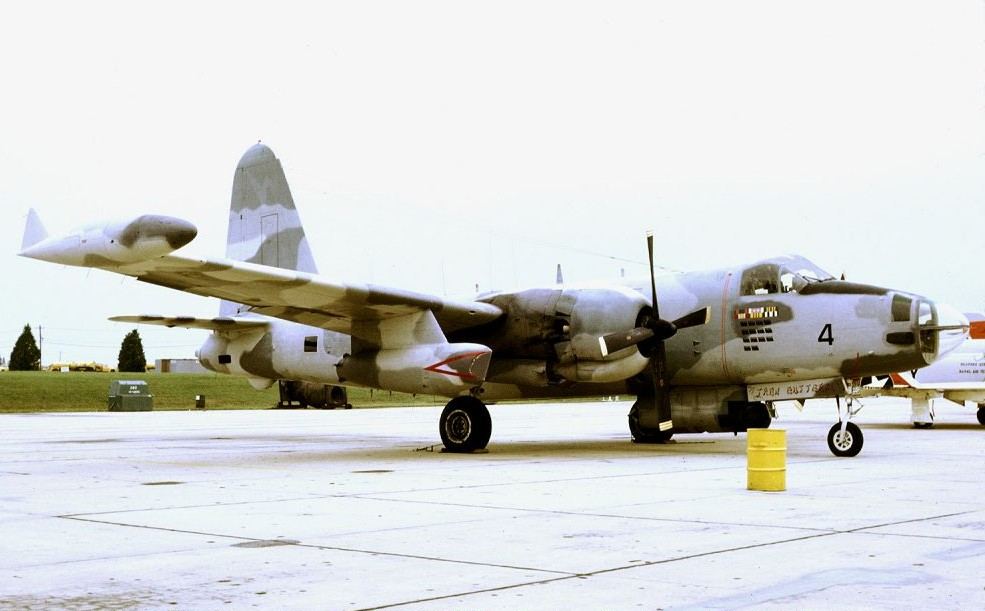
VAH-21 AP-2H at NAS Patuxent River in 1969

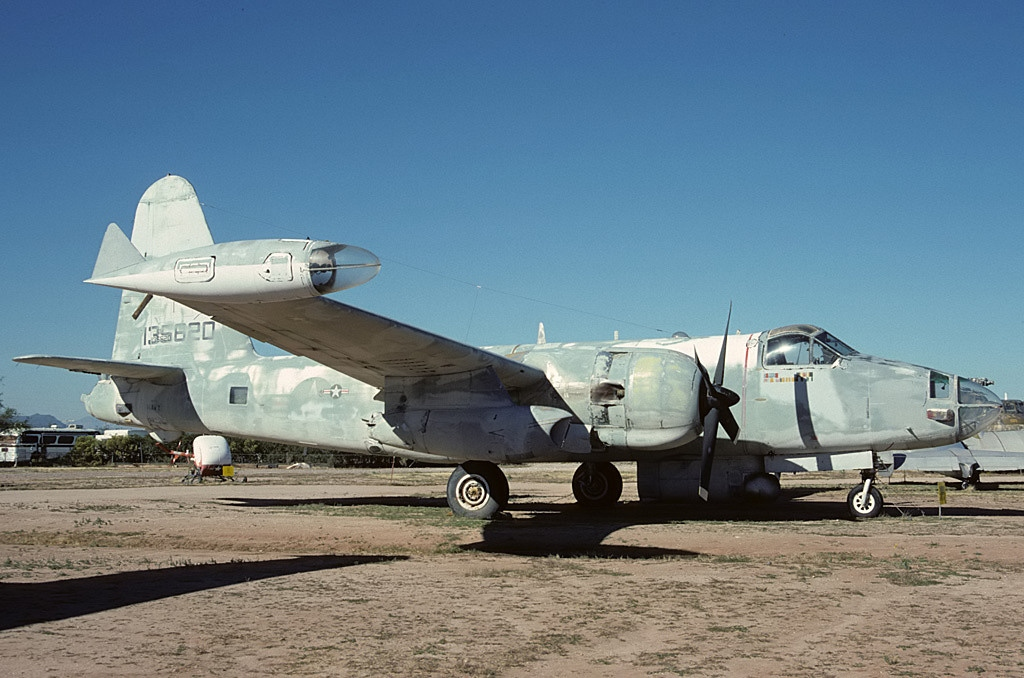
Former VAH-21 AP-2H on display at the Pima Air & Space Museum

VAH-21, nicknamed the Roadrunners, was a short-lived Heavy Attack Squadron of the United States Navy, based at Naval Station Sangley Point, Philippines. The squadron flew the specialized AP-2H version of the Lockheed P-2 Neptune aircraft, of which four examples were converted from standard SP-2H airframes.

== Operations ==
The squadron was established on 1 September 1968, as the first squadron in the Navy with a night interdiction mission using new electronic surveillance equipment. Its mission was to interdict logistics moving over land or sea. A detachment of VAH-21 was immediately established at a Navy facility associated with Cam Ranh Air Base, South Vietnam. The detachment had been a Naval Air Test Center Project TRIM Detachment (TRIM: Trails Roads Interdiction Multi-sensor) prior to becoming a VAH-21 detachment. VAH-21 was disestablished on 16 June 1969.

== See also ==
- History of the United States Navy
- List of inactive United States Navy aircraft squadrons
