= NHZ =

NHZ can refer to:

- the IATA code for Naval Air Station Brunswick
- the ISO 639-3 code for the Santa María la Alta Nahuatl dialect
- nHz, nanohertz, a frequency of one cycle per 10^{9} seconds (about 32 years)
