= VP-26 =

VP-26 Tridents
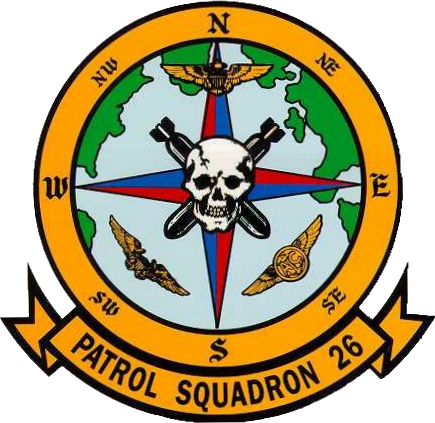
- VP-26 unit insignia
- Active: 1946–present
- Country: United States of America
- Branch: United States Navy
- Type: Squadron
- Role: Maritime or land-based patrol and reconnaissance
- Part of: Patrol and Reconnaissance Wing ELEVEN
- Garrison/HQ: Naval Air Station Jacksonville, Florida
- Nickname: Bone Deep

Aircraft flown
- Patrol: PB4Y-1; PB4Y-2; P2V-4/5/5F; P-3B/C; Boeing P-8 Poseidon

The VP-26 Tridents are a United States Navy aircraft squadron based at Naval Air Station Jacksonville in Florida. The squadron flies Boeing P-8A patrol aircraft. It was established as Bombing Squadron 114 (VB-114) on 26 August 1943 and renamed Patrol Bombing Squadron 114 (VPB-114) on 1 October 1944; Patrol Squadron 114 (VP-114) on 15 May 1946; Heavy Patrol Squadron (Landplane) 6 (VP-HL-6) on 15 November 1946, and Patrol Squadron 26 (VP-26) on 1 September 1948. The Tridents are the third squadron to be designated VP-26; the first VP-26 was renamed VP-102 on 16 December 1940, and the second VP-26 was renamed VP-14 on 1 July 1941.

== Mission ==
As a member of Patrol Wing Eleven, VP-26 is a maritime patrol squadron with a worldwide theater of operations. Mission areas include anti-submarine warfare (ASW); anti-morale warfare (AMW); anti-surface warfare (ASU); command and control warfare (C2W); command, control and communications (CCC); intelligence (INT); mine warfare (MIW).

== History ==
=== 1940s ===
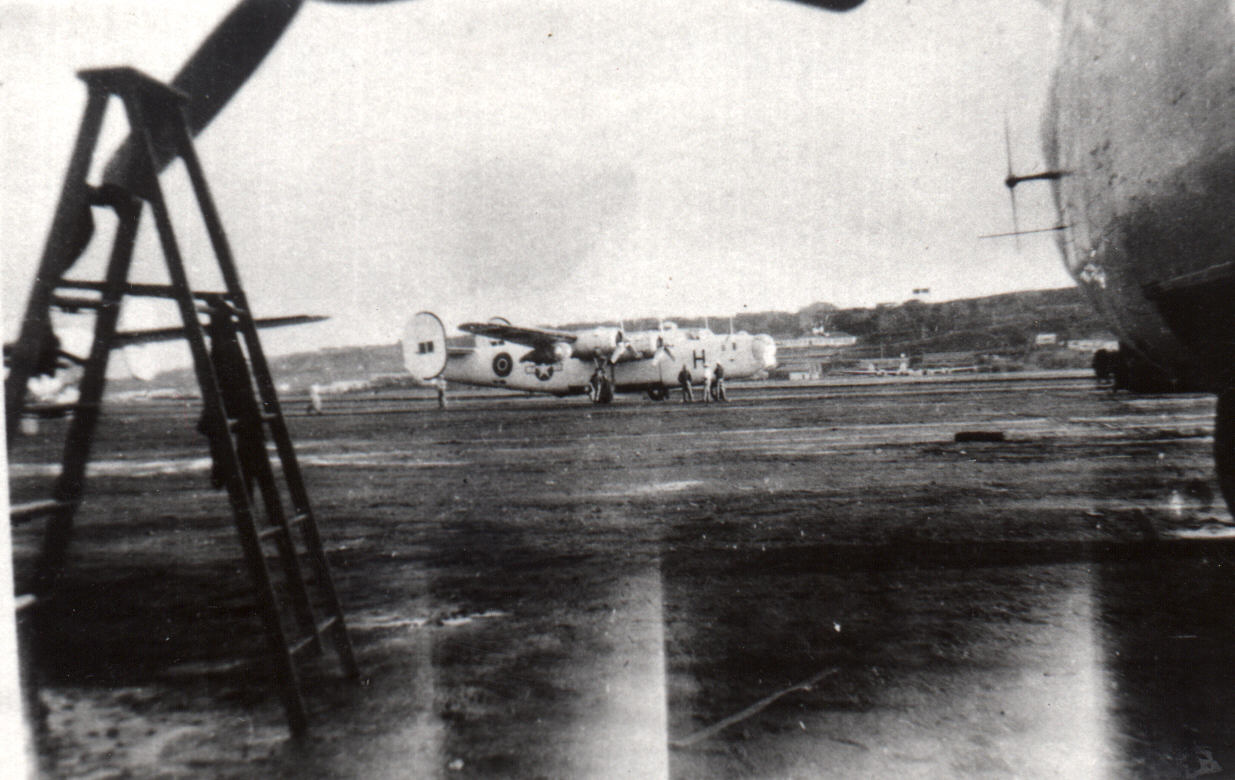
VPB-114 PB4Y-1 with US and British markings at Lajes Field in 1944

VB-114 was established on 26 August 1943 at NAS Norfolk, Virginia, as a bombing squadron flying the PB4Y-1 Liberator heavy bomber under FAW-5. From 14 October to December 1943, the squadron relocated to NAAS Oceana in Virginia for further training on the PB4Y-1. By December it became apparent that the squadron's emphasis would be anti-submarine warfare and, on 11 December 1943, one of the squadron's PB4Y-1s was sent to NAS Quonset Point in Rhode Island for installation of a General Electric L-7 searchlight. On 21 December, the remainder of the squadron aircraft and crews were sent to NAS Quonset Point for similar refits; this was followed by one week of specialized training in the use of the searchlight in night attacks on enemy submarines. Six days later, an advance party of one officer and 21 enlisted personnel were ordered to NAS Norfolk to prepare for the squadron's shipment overseas. The rest of the squadron remained at NAS Quonset Point to complete the ASW syllabus on night attacks.

Between 12 February and 4 March 1944, transfer orders were received for NAF Port Lyautey in French Morocco. On 16 February, the Norfolk detachment and the squadron's equipment left for Casablanca on USS Rockaway. Its aircraft left Quonset Point on 21 February for Morrison Field in West Palm Beach, Florida, and from there (in sections) to NAF Port Lyautey. The last aircraft arrived on 4 March 1944, and VB-114 came under the administrative control of FAW-15.

A detachment of three crews and aircraft was sent to Agadir, French Morocco, between 7 and 18 March for familiarization flights in the combat zone; the first combat patrols began on 18 March. A second detachment of six aircraft and crews was sent to Gibraltar on 29 April (arriving on the 30th), and was ready for patrol on 1 May. A lack of enemy contacts led to the return of four crews and aircraft to Port Lyautey on 7 June, leaving two crews and one aircraft at Gibraltar for contingencies. On 17 June, a detachment of six searchlight-equipped aircraft and nine aircrews deployed to RAF Dunkeswell in Devon, England, under the administrative control of FAW-7. Its mission was to protect Allied shipping from enemy U-boats during the invasion of Normandy. By 9 July, the detachment had increased by three searchlight-equipped aircraft.

The two remaining VB-114 aircraft and crews at NAF Port Lyautey were relocated to Lajes Field in the Azores between 20 July and 1 August 1944, leaving no squadrons in French Morocco. Two aircraft from the Dunkeswell detachment arrived on 24 July to supplement the group, and movement of all equipment, supplies, personnel and aircraft was completed by 28 July. The Azores detachment was under the administrative control of FAW-9. The first combat mission flown from neutral Portuguese territory took place on 1 August; the Azores belonged to Portugal, which was neutral in World War II. Britain, a longtime Portuguese ally, had been allowed to establish an air base on the Azores in 1943. Although the airfield could be used as a staging post by U.S. aircraft, it could not be a permanent base unless its aircraft had British markings. An agreement was reached for the squadron to be based on Terceira Island, operating under RAF Coastal Command control with British and U.S. markings. The detachment remaining in the UK continued under the operational control of FAW-7.

From 18 November 1944 to 14 February 1945, tour completion and crew rotation were imminent for the squadron. To have enough aircraft and experienced aircrews for replacement-crew training, the Dunkeswell detachment was reduced to four aircrews and four aircraft and the remainder were sent to supplement the Lajes Field detachment. Replacement crews began arriving in the Azores on 8 December 1944, and began the night-searchlight training program. The four aircraft and crews left at Dunkeswell rejoined the squadron on 14 February 1945.

On 26 May 1945, orders were received to establish a squadron detachment of six aircraft and seven crews for hurricane reconnaissance at NAS Boca Chica in Key West, Florida. The aircraft left the Azores for Florida on 31 May. Administrative control of the Lajes Field squadron was transferred from FAW-9 to FAW-11 on 29 May. On 29 June, VB-114 deployed a detachment of three aircraft and four crews to NAF Port Lyautey; this left six aircraft at Lajes Field with the squadron's administrative-command staff.

In October and November 1945, squadron detachments at Boca Chica and NS San Juan in Puerto Rico were closed and moved to NAAS Edenton in North Carolina. The squadron was ordered to move its headquarters from the Azores to NAS Edenton on 29 November, maintaining detachments at NAS Port Lyautey and Lajes Field, and came under the operational control of FAW-5.

It was based at NAS Atlantic City in New Jersey in January 1947, and a three-aircraft detachment remained at NAF Port Lyautey with ASW its primary mission. Most flight activities, as assigned by ComNavEastLantMed, were mail and passenger transport, search and rescue and special flights. Within a year, the rest of the squadron was again based at NAF Port Lyautey.

The squadron deployed to NAS Argentia in Newfoundland on 4 January 1948 to conduct cold-weather operations and provide services to Commander Task Force 61. On 26 June, Russia and East Germany closed Berlin to all traffic except for specified air lanes. The Western Allied air forces began the Berlin Airlift (which became known as Operation Vittles) to sustain the city. VP-HL-6 flew a number of missions to bring medical supplies to airfields in the Allied zone of occupation, where they were transferred to unarmed transport aircraft flying missions into Berlin. The blockade was lifted in May 1949. In March of that year, the squadron's headquarters and home port were changed from NAS Patuxent River in Maryland to NAS Port Lyautey; the squadron detachment at NAS Port Lyautey became a full squadron, with a detachment at NAS Patuxent River.

=== 1950s ===
On 8 April 1950, PB4Y-2 Privateer BuNo 59645 was declared overdue by Flight Service Frankfurt in Germany. The Privateer, based at NAF Port Lyautey, was flying a patrol mission from Wiesbaden Air Base in West Germany over the Baltic Sea off the coast of Liepāja, Latvia. A 10-day search in the Baltic area by VP-26 and USAF aircraft was fruitless, but a Swedish fishing vessel picked up a life vest from the missing aircraft several days later. Shortly afterwards, the Soviet Union published a note of protest accusing the missing aircraft of violating international law by crossing the Soviet border and exchanging fire with Soviet fighter aircraft; however, the Privateer was unarmed. Lieutenant John H. Fette and his crew of four officers and six enlisted men were never accounted for, and were presumed to be among the first casualties of the Cold War. Although unconfirmed reports said that the missing crew members were recovered from the sea after being shot down and forwarded to the KGB for interrogation, their ultimate fate was never determined. American former Gulag prisoner John H. Noble reported after his release that a fellow inmate had told him of eight American airmen who had survived a crash in the Baltic Sea and had been held by the Soviets at the same prison camp in the Vorkuta area.

VP-26 was relocated to a new home base at NAS Patuxent River under the operational control of FAW-3 on 30 June of that year, and began transition training from the PB4Y-2 Privateer to the P-2V4 Neptune. In February 1952, it was the first patrol squadron relocated to the newly established NAS Brunswick in Maine. On 14 February, the squadron had its first fatal accident when P2V-4 EB-7 crashed in a wooded area off the end of the runway at NAS Brunswick; the copilot and four crew members were killed in the crash.

It participated in Operation LANTFLEX, the annual Atlantic Fleet exercise, in October 1954. Lieutenant (jg) C. O. Paddock disabled the USS Toro with a small target-practice bomb which made a direct hit on its periscope, and the Toro's skipper presented Lieutenant (jg) Paddock with a mounted portion of the twisted periscope. In March 1955, VP-26 deployed to NAS Keflavik in Iceland. During the deployment, the squadron replaced its P2V-5 (MAD) aircraft with 12 new P2V-5F Neptunes with jet auxiliary-engine mounts. VP-26 deployed to Thule Air Base in Greenland the following year, and was the first patrol squadron to fly all 12 aircraft over the North Pole. On 5 September 1957 it deployed to NAS Keflavik for NATO aerial mine-warfare exercises, and a detachment was maintained at NAS Port Lyautey; on 3 December, a VP-26 P2V-5F was the first U.S. Navy combat-type aircraft to land at the Spanish air base at Rota, Spain (NAS Rota was established in November 1957). VP-26 made a split deployment to NAS Keflavik and NAS Argentia from 22 November 1958 to 4 May 1959, during which the squadron located a Russian trawler which deliberately severed transatlantic cables in February 1959.

=== 1960s ===
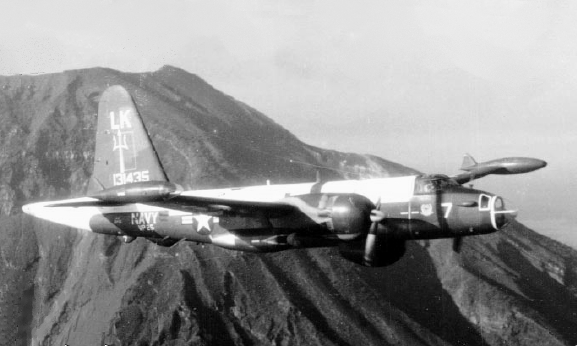
VP-26 P-2E in 1964

On 25 January 1960, VP-26 deployed a six-aircraft detachment to NAS Rota. The squadron participated in NATO ASW exercise Dawn Breeze, based at Lann-Bihoué in France, in March; it was the first to operate from the base in nearly a decade.

VP-26 deployed a six-aircraft detachment to NAS Argentia for a planned five-month tour in September 1962, but the October Cuban Missile Crisis cut the deployment short. On 23 October, VP-26 deployed the detachment to NAS Key West in Florida to help maintain the Cuban quarantine by preventing Soviet-bloc vessels from bringing in intermediate-range missiles and long-range bombers. The remaining squadron aircraft were deployed across the North Atlantic from NAS Argentia to Lajes Field.

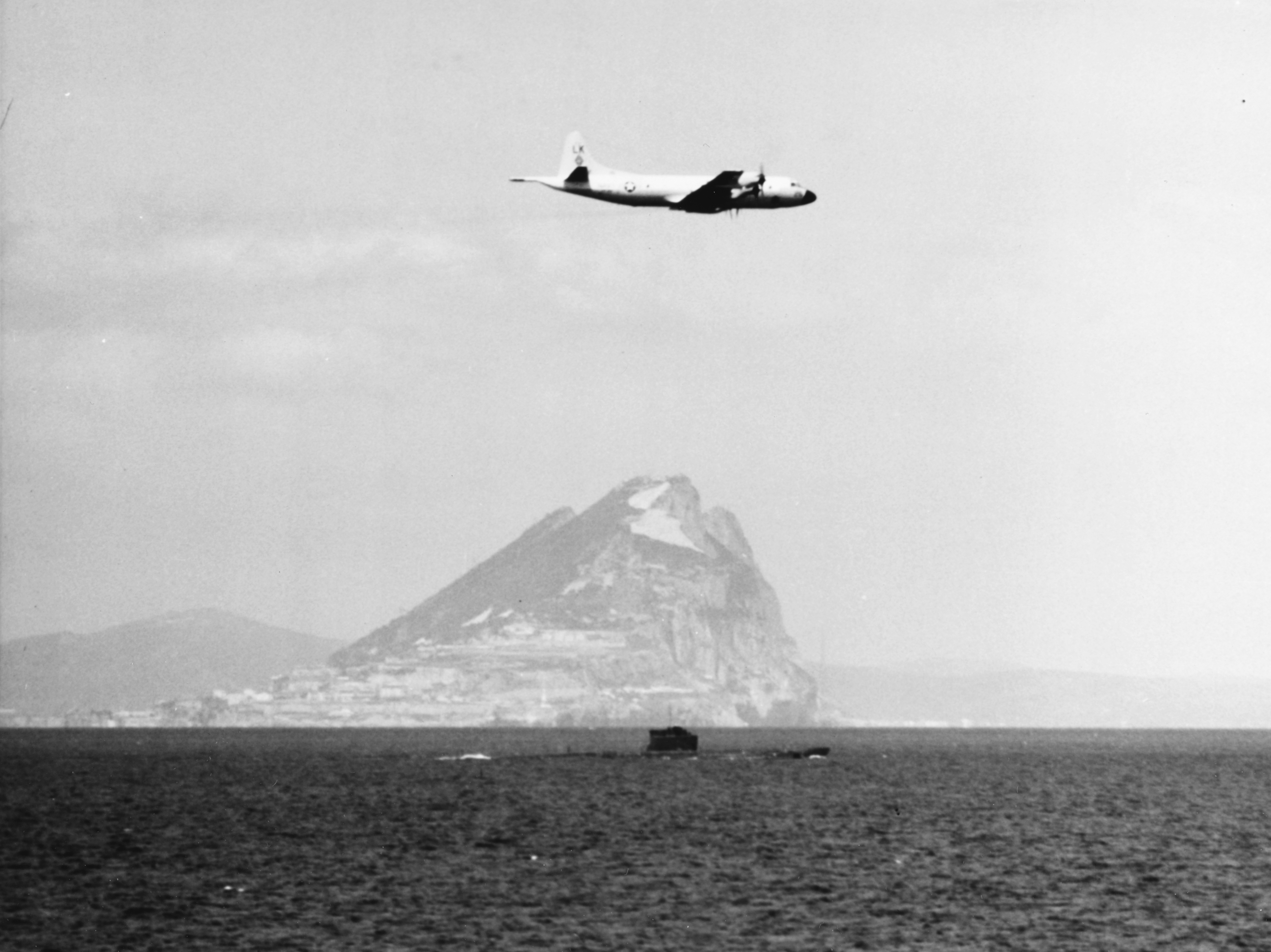
VP-26 P-3B overflies a Soviet Zulu-class submarine off Gibraltar in 1969

In October 1964, VP-26 supplied one aircraft and crew for a month to work with U.S. Army Special Forces personnel at Pope AFB in North Carolina. The SP-2E aircraft was reconfigured as a jump platform for Special Forces parachutists making high-altitude day and night jumps. From October 1965 to 5 January 1966, VP-26 began transition training from the P2V Neptune (flown by the squadron for over 15 years) to the new P-3B Orion. The first P-3B arrived at NAS Brunswick on 5 January 1966, when VP-26 was the Navy's first operational P-3B squadron. It deployed to NAS Argentia on 19 July 1966, with a detachment at NAS Keflavik. Squadron personnel could see the newly formed, ephemeral volcanic island of Syrtlingur (Little Surtsey), which rose from the sea in July 1965 before eroding and disappearing in late October.

From 24 November 1967 to April 1968, VP-26 deployed to the western Pacific with detachments based at NS Sangley Point in the Philippines and U-Tapao Royal Thai Navy Airfield in Thailand. The squadron relieved VP-5 at NS Sangley Point and was tasked with Yankee Team patrols in the Gulf of Tonkin, Market Time surveillance off the southern coast of South Vietnam and open-sea patrols in the South China Sea. It lost two aircraft during the deployment. P-3B NuNo. 153440, piloted by Lieutenant Commander Robert F. Meglio, crashed at sea with the loss of the entire crew of CAC-8 on 6 February 1968. Twelve men from CAC-1 were killed when their P-3B BuNo. 153445, piloted by Lieutenant (jg) Stuart M. McClellan, was shot down on 1 April off the coast of South Vietnam near Phú Quốc Island. When the squadron returned on 2 June 1968, flight-crew members received several Air Medals and Vietnam service and campaign medals. In August 1968, the squadron received an "E" for Battle Efficiency from FAW-3.

=== 1970s ===
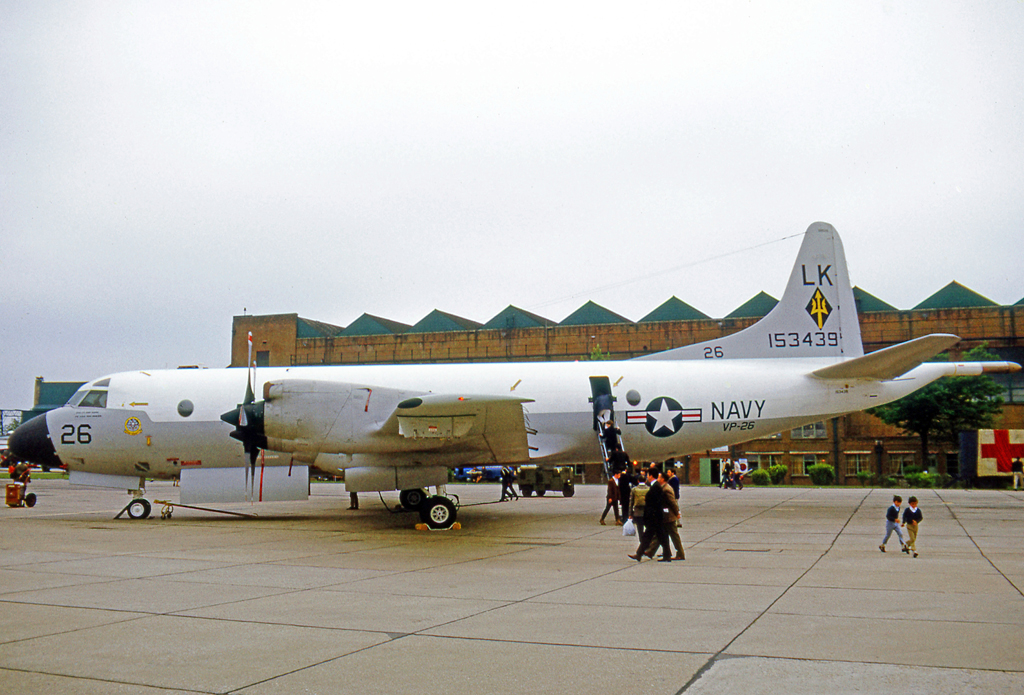
VP-26 P-3B in 1971

VP-26 deployed to NAS Sigonella in Sicily from 19 June to October 1970, relieving VP-5. This coincided with the Black September events in Jordan; the squadron averaged two sorties each day in the eastern Mediterranean from 10 September to 22 October, when the situation stabilized.

It received the Fleet Air Wing Atlantic Chief of Naval Operations Safety Award for 1972. As a result of the squadron's tactical efforts in 1973 and 1974, VP-26 received the Captain Arnold Jay Isbell Trophy for excellence in anti-submarine warfare. In 1975, the squadron was involved in celebrating the United States Bicentennial. In addition to flying a 13-starred tail cap on their aircraft, over 100 men and women from VP-26 undertook the exterior renovation of the Pejepscot Museum in Brunswick, Maine, earning the squadron a Navy Bicentennial Command designation. As the fleet's only active-duty bicentennial squadron, the 1976 split-site deployment to NS Rota and Lajes Field gave VP-26 the opportunity to display its bicentennial colors throughout the Mediterranean, Europe and the North Atlantic. The squadron received the Golden Wrench Award for superior achievement in aircraft maintenance and readiness and the Captain Arnold Jay Isbell Trophy for 1976. In September 1977, VP-26 was deployed to several locations throughout the North Atlantic. Primarily based at NAS Bermuda and Lajes Field, the squadron had detachments in the Panama Canal Zone, RAF Ascension Island, NAS Guantanamo Bay, NAS Keflavik and NS San Juan. Coordinated operations highlighted this deployment, as aircrews participated in a number of ASW exercises with NATO and Allied Naval Forces. Returning to NAS Brunswick in early 1978, VP-26 received the Meritorious Unit Commendation, the Silver and Golden Anchor Awards for retention excellence, and the CNO Aviation Safety Award for operations in 1976 and 1977. In March 1979 VP-26 began transitioning from the P-3B to the P-3C Update II, which incorporated the latest in avionics and weapons systems (including a turret-mounted infrared detection device which lowered from the nose to identify targets day or night, and AGM-84A Harpoon missile capability).

=== 1980s ===
The squadron deployed to NAF Kadena in Okinawa in early March 1980, maintaining a detachment at Diego Garcia; this was the first Southeast Asian deployment by an East Coast patrol squadron since 1967. The detachment at Diego Garcia was a response to the Soviet buildup of military forces in the Persian Gulf. VP-26 returned to NAS Brunswick in September and received the Navy Expeditionary Medal for its Indian Ocean activities; it also received the 1981 CNO Safety Award. In early May 1981, VP-26 deployed to NS Rota and Lajes Field. On 1 July 1982, VP-26's Special Projects detachment became a separate squadron, Special Projects Patrol Squadron VPU-1, after being a VP-26 detachment since 1969. That month, VP-26 deployed to NAS Keflavik. Three crews were detached for three months to the Western Pacific to augment WESTPAC Harpoon capabilities. Before leaving NAS Keflavik, VP-26 crews had operated from Bodø Main Air Station, Andøya and Stavanger, Norway; Thule AB, Greenland; RAF Machrihanish and RAF Kinloss, Scotland; RAF Mildenhall and RAF St Mawgan, England; Valkenburg Naval Air Base, the Netherlands; Nordholz, Germany; Rota, Spain; Lajes Field, Azores; Misawa and Kadena, Japan; Cubi Point, Philippines, and U-Tapao in Thailand. Returning to NAS Brunswick in December 1982, it was the first occupant of newly built Hangar #5.

In November 1983 VP-26 deployed to NAS Bermuda, with detachments to Lajes Field and NS Roosevelt Roads (where they averaged over 1,000 flight hours per month for three consecutive months). VP-26 again deployed to Kadena, Japan in January 1985. It operated with units of the Seventh Fleet in the Western Pacific and Indian Oceans and operated simultaneously from every Seventh Fleet deployment site on several occasions. In June 1986, VP-26 deployed to NS Rota and Lajes Field. While conducting operations in the Mediterranean and North Atlantic, aircrews visited France, the United Kingdom, Greece, Senegal, Iceland, Bermuda, Italy, and Gibraltar. At home in 1987, the squadron maintained detachments to NAS Jacksonville, NAS Bermuda, Iceland, Lajes Field, RAF Ascension Island, NS Puerto Rico and Thule Air Base; it had a 100-percent sortie-completion rate during its detachments. In November 1987 VP-26 deployed to NAS Keflavik, and its crews had a good ASW mission record against Soviet submarines. The deployment was capped by another Golden Wrench Award and a second Battle "E" for 1988. In June 1989 VP-26 deployed to NS Rota and Lajes Field, accumulating over 5,400 flight hours in six months. The squadron supported sixteen operational detachments to England, Ascension Island, NAS Sigonella, Sicily, Turkey, and Africa, at one point maintaining a detachment for 11 consecutive weeks. Its highlight was a record six weeks in NSA Souda Bay, Crete, supporting Sixth Fleet operations. The squadron then received its third Battle "E" Award.

=== 1990s ===
With the Breakup of Yugoslavia, VP-26 had three consecutive deployments to NAS Sigonella. Detachments were sent to Saudi Arabia to monitor the United Nations embargo against Iraq. VP-26 enforced the embargo against the former Yugoslavia over the Adriatic Sea in the first continuous Mediterranean armed patrols since World War II, with torpedoes and Maverick missiles. The squadron was among the first to conduct land electro-optic surveillance patrols and visit emerging East European democracies. On 7 November 1990 VP-26 left NAS Brunswick for a unique tri-site deployment, distributing VP-26 aircraft at NAS Key West, Roosevelt Roads and Lajes Field. While performing narcotics detection and monitoring operations out of Key West and Roosevelt Roads, VP-26 aircrews located two suspicious vessels; they were seized, and confirmed to have a total of over 1,300 kilograms of cocaine with an estimated street value of over $30 million. VP-26 returned to Roosevelt Roads for a two-month detachment in August 1991 for continued narcotics detection and monitoring operations in support of the nation's war on drugs. The squadron's 10 May 1992 split-site deployment to Jeddah, Saudi Arabia and NAS Sigonella earned a Meritorious Unit Commendation for operations in the Adriatic, Red and Mediterranean Seas. VP-26 was the first P-3 squadron to fly missions in the Adriatic during Operation Maritime Monitor, and conducted the first Portugal-United States joint mine exercise in the MAP/CIS joint exercise.

It received the Joint Meritorious Unit Commendation for meritorious service in support of Operation Desert Calm, United Nations sanctions against the former Republic of Yugoslavia, and operations with deployed marine amphibious readiness groups and carrier battle groups from September 1993 to February 1994. VP-26 flew over 620 armed sorties during this time (including daily Maverick Surface Unit Combat Air Patrol) in support of Operation Sharp Guard, amassing 4,800 flight hours, and completed the first live Maverick warshot by an operational P-3 squadron. In October 1994 VP-26 conducted a formation Mining Readiness Certification Inspection (MRCI), the first MRCI flown in close formation by a VP squadron in five years. VP-26 was called on to conduct a December 1994 SAR effort 950 miles (1,530 km) off the coast of New England for the 450-foot (140 m) Ukrainian freighter, Salvador Allende, which was taking on water in stormy seas. VP-26 flew over 85 hours in six days in support of the effort, during which two people were rescued after the vessel sank. In January 1995, the Tridents returned to NAS Sigonella for their third consecutive Mediterranean deployment; VP-26 flew over 5,000 hours and 468 armed sorties in support of Operations Sharp Guard and Deny Flight.

From July 1995 to February 1996, the squadron began a seven-month transition to the P-3C Update III aircraft. In August 1996, VP-26 conducted a tri-site deployment to Iceland, Puerto Rico and Panama. It had the highest drug-interdiction rate, with more than $1.9 billion in cocaine and marijuana arrests. Cocaine alone was over 38 metric tons, equivalent to over 20 percent of estimated US consumption. The crews at NAS Keflavik had the highest total contact time on submarines of all US maritime patrol squadrons in the previous four years. VP-26 was the first US military unit invited to participate in the Norwegian FLOTEX 96 national exercise, and the squadron received its fourth Battle "E" Award in 1996.

VP-26 returned home to Brunswick, Maine, in January 1997 for another home cycle, beginning preparations for its February 1998 deployment to NAS Sigonella. The squadron flew over 180 flights in Operation Joint Forge in support of United Nations peacekeepers on the ground in Bosnia-Herzegovina. VP-26 returned home in August 1998 and began an inter-deployment training cycle (IDTC), training maintenance personnel and aircrew. For its "millennium" deployment, the squadron was split between NAS Keflavik and NS Roosevelt Roads. The Keflavik detachment supported NATO operations deploying to Andøya, Norway; RAF Kinloss, Scotland; Lann Bihoue, France; NS Rota, Spain, and NAS Sigonella in Sicily. The Caribbean detachment tracked suspected narcotics traffickers in the air and on the sea. VP-26 deployed a number of detachments to Manta, Ecuador, to bring its counter-narcotics mission to the eastern Pacific.

=== 2000s ===
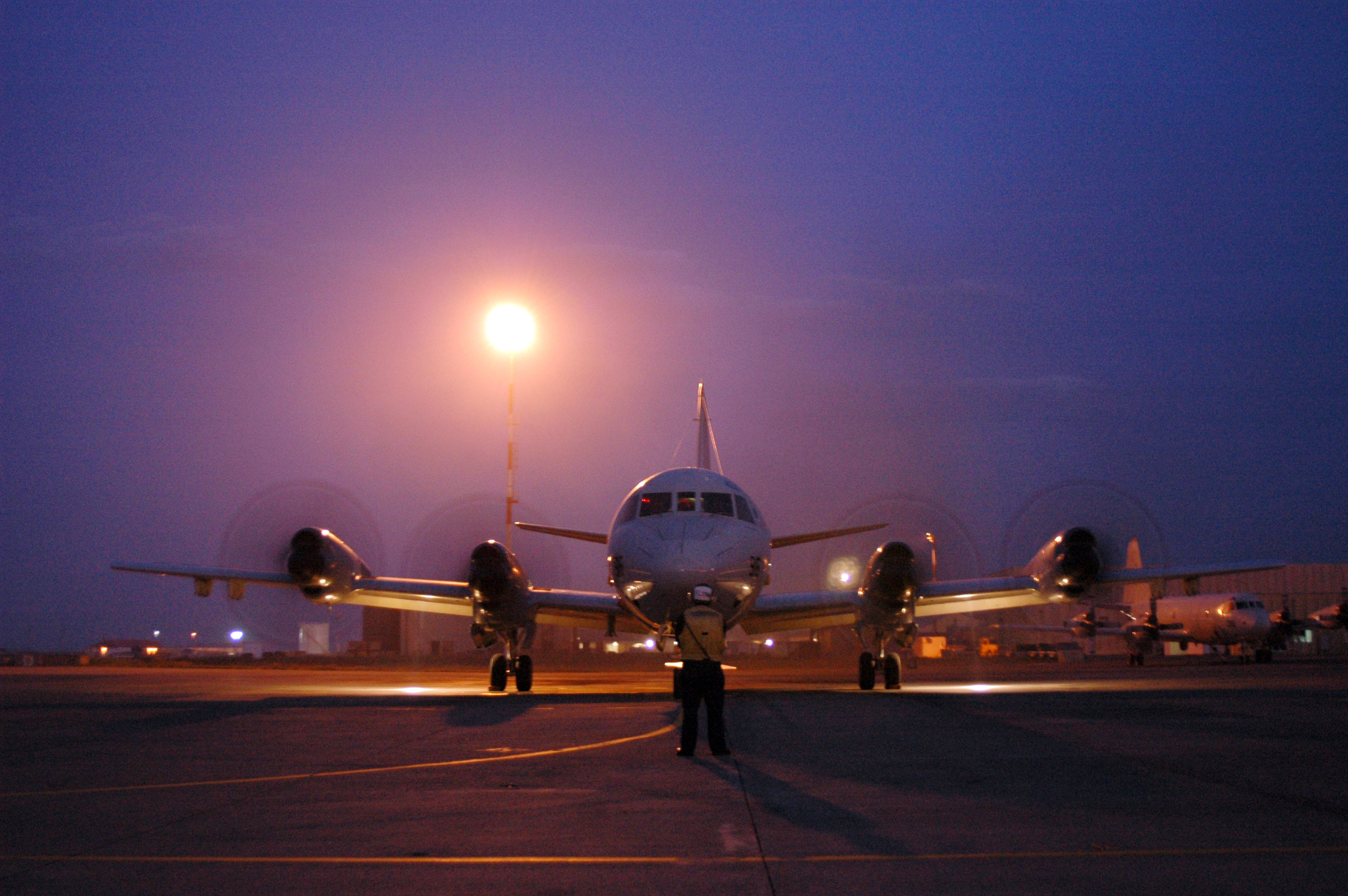
VP-26 P-3C and ground crewman in 2006

VP-26 accumulated 275,000 mishap-free flight hours in over 38 years by 2000, a world record for civilian and military aviation. In preparation for its next Mediterranean deployment, the squadron trained its 12 aircrews in the new P-3C Update III AIP (anti-surface-warfare improvement program) aircraft with state-of-the-art improvements in command, control, communications and intelligence; surveillance, and survivability. The squadron received its first AIP aircraft in September 2000. VP-26 also conducted extensive training to employ the SLAM and Maverick missiles.

In February 2001 VP-26 returned to NAS Sigonella to support the United Nations Operations Deliberate Forge and Joint Guardian, and participated in several multinational exercises in Africa and Europe. During its six months in Sicily the squadron flew over 5,000 mishap-free operational hours, with a 93-percent sortie-completion rate. VP-26 deployed detachments to 15 countries (including NS Rota, Spain; Souda Bay, Crete; Nordholtz, Germany; Visby, Sweden; Nîmes, France; RAF Kinloss, Scotland; Malta, and Turkey), and flew missions over the Atlantic Ocean, Baltic Sea, Black Sea, North Sea and the Mediterranean. The missions included support for two US carrier battle groups and NATO surface combatants, overland reconnaissance in support of NATO stabilization forces (SFOR) and its Kosovo Force (KFOR), and over 20 multinational exercises with 24 nations. On 10 August 2001, VP-26 arrived at its home base at Brunswick, Maine, for an inter-deployment cycle. After the September 11 attacks, the squadron had a heightened state of readiness and supported the war on terrorism by participating in homeland-defense operations.

In August 2002, VP-26 began its six-month, split-site deployment to NAS Keflavik and NS Roosevelt Roads. Aircrews participated in missions ranging from armed surface-combat air patrol in the Strait of Gibraltar to the wars on drugs and terrorism. In the Caribbean and eastern Pacific, VP-26 missions led to the interdiction of 12,641 kilograms of cocaine with a street value of over $3.4 billion. The squadron also helped introduce AIP to USSOUTHCOM. It flew over 5,000 miles (including 83 ASW exercises), and was nominated for the 2002 Phoenix Award for Maintenance Excellence and the 2002 Battle Efficiency Award. VP-26 supported its community through Manta Santa (200 families received clothing, 1,678 children received toys, and a local children's hospital received an $800 donation), Sisters of Mother Teresa aid in Reykjavik, and a number of adopt-a-school affiliations.

On 4 April 2003, VP-26 held its 57th change of command as Commander Matthew J. Carter relieved Commander Sean S. Buck. In attendance were the squadron's friends and family and members of New York City Fire Department's Ladder 10, with which VP-26 is affiliated. The firefighters presented the command a cross fabricated of steel from the World Trade Center and a photograph of ground zero. On 7 April, two VP-26 crews and maintenance support personnel left for the Mediterranean to participate in the Iraq War. The squadron began its detachment at NS Rota and later at NAS Sigonella, flying armed support for supply boats transiting the Strait of Gibraltar. At NAS Sigonella, it flew a number of missions supporting the USS Harry S. Truman and USS Theodore Roosevelt carrier battle groups. In addition to homeland defense, VP-26 provided mechanical support to aircraft from other bases and ground logistics for their crews. In May and June 2003, squadron members built houses with Habitat for Humanity, Bath–Brunswick Area (HFHBBA).

VP-26 celebrated 41 years of mishap-free flying in August 2003, a record recognized by the Navy and the Federal Aviation Administration (FAA). On this basis the squadron was the safest organization in military and civilian aviation, flying over 296,000 hours without a mishap since 1962 (when a P-2E Neptune caught fire and exploded during a ground-maintenance engine check). On 17 September, Combat Air Crew 1 (CAC-1) flew to NAS Jacksonville to participate in a composite training unit exercise with the USS Enterprise carrier battle group. The following day, CAC-1 was joined by CAC-5 and a maintenance detachment. VP-26 participated for two weeks and flew over 75 hours in the exercise, which had been moved from the Florida coast due to Hurricane Isabel.

The squadron deployed at the end of January 2004, relieving VP-45 at NAS Sigonella. VP-26 flew in Operations Deliberate Forge and Joint Guardian in Kosovo and Bosnia and escort missions through the Strait of Gibraltar, escorting USNR ships and keeping the sea lines of communication open. It participated in the February and March Exercise Dogfish, a multinational ASW exercise. CAC-4 conducted a successful April SAR event, saving over 80 people whose ship had sunk. Later, two crews went to the Persian Gulf to support the Iraq War. In May and June, the squadron flew in Operation Active Endeavor to support the 2004 Summer Olympic Games.

VP-26 was relieved by VP-16 at NAS Sigonella, and returned to NAS Brunswick in the beginning of July; most squadron personnel returned home on 4 July. During the rest of the year, the squadron continued training. It commemorated 42 years of mishap-free flying, totaling over 303,420 hours, in August. In September, one crew detached for six days to NAS Jacksonville. With Hangar 6 under construction, VP-26 moved in with VP-92. Two squadrons sharing a hangar was beneficial because VP-26 was the test squadron for active-reserve integration. In December, two crews from VP-92 joined VP-26 as the first reserve crews which were part of an active squadron. VP-26 earned several awards during the year, including the Global War on Terrorism Medal, Armed Forces Expeditionary Medal and Kosovo Campaign Medal; two crews earned the Global War on Terrorism Expeditionary Medal. The squadron again won the Golden Anchor Award for Retention Excellence.

VP-26 again deployed to NAS Sigonella and Comalopa Air Base in El Salvador in late 2005, providing support for Operation Active Endeavor and multinational exercises in Bulgaria, Romania, Lithuania, France, Crete, Ghana, and Germany, and hosting naval forces from throughout Europe for Operation Noble Manta and Caribbean anti-drug operations. The squadron returned to Brunswick in June 2006, and received the Armed Forces Service Medal.

In 2007, VP-26 passed 410,000 hours of mishap-free flying. An inter-deployment training cycle, with surge detachments to the Fifth Fleet AOR, consumed most of the year. In December, the squadron deployed to the Fifth Fleet AOR in support of the global war on terror, the Iraq and Afghanistan wars and anti-piracy operation in the Horn of Africa.

The 2005 Base Realignment and Closure Commission recommended that Naval Air Station Brunswick be closed, Patrol and Reconnaissance Wing FIVE be deactivated and VP-26 be moved to Naval Air Station Jacksonville, joining Patrol and Reconnaissance Wing ELEVEN. That home-port change was made in January 2010.

=== 2010s ===
VP-26 deployed in December 2011 to the Fifth Fleet AOR. The squadron flew missions in support of Operation New Dawn, Operation Enduring Freedom and conducted maritime surveillance operations in the Persian Gulf, Straits of Hormuz, Gulf of Oman and the Arabian Sea. The squadron supported the Abraham Lincoln Carrier Strike Group (CSG), flying 57 armed sorties in operations including Nautical Union, Desert Dragon, Noble Prophet, and a detachment to Masirah, Oman.

VP-26 deployed in May 2013 to the Seventh Fleet AOR, marking the first integrated active and reserve P-3C deployment. They executed 245 operational missions and 3,808 flight hours in support of 28 multi-national exercises, 20 U.S. maritime exercises, and 23 detachments to 12 countries, including the first U.S. P-3C detachment to New Zealand since 1984. The squadron also performed the first dual LSRS mission, the first VQ-LSRS cross-cueing operation and the first complete image collection of a priority target in support of Commander, U.S.

VP-26 crews executed 184 ASW missions and accumulated 412 ASW contact hours on nine different classes of foreign submarines. Following Typhoon Haiyan, the squadron responded with the first U.S. Navy aircraft on scene to provide humanitarian assistance and disaster relief to the Republic of the Philippines in support of Operation Damayan.

In January 2015, VP-26 deployed to Isa Air Base, Bahrain and maintained detachment sites in Incirlik, Turkey and Comalapa, El Salvador. This deployment marked the last deployment of P-3C's from east coast squadrons. Early in the El Salvador detachment, the crew seized more than 530 kilograms of cocaine worth an estimated $17 million and, ultimately, disrupted $625 million worth of narcotics shipments in cooperation with U.S. Coast Guard and Canadian forces. The squadron also executed 3,500 overland combat hours across the Fifth and Sixth Fleet AORs in support of Operation Inherent Resolve and other multi-national efforts, including the Struggle Against Violent Extremism. VP-26 participated in a ceremony that marked the 65th anniversary of the first US aircraft shot down by the Soviets in the Cold War and was attended by key leaders and over one hundred members of the Latvia military.

In March 2016, VP-26 accepted their first P-8A Poseidon and completed their squadron transition to the P-8A in May 2016. In March 2017, the Tridents left for their first operational deployment in the P-8A to the Seventh Fleet AOR.

VP-26 was the last active navy P-3 squadron at NAS Jacksonville to convert to the P-8A.

In October 2017 VP-26 returned from its first overseas deployment with its P-8A aircraft. The deployment to the Western Pacific lasted six-months.

== Awards ==
VP-26 has received five Battle Effectiveness Awards, three Captain Arnold Jay Isbell Trophies, two Golden Wrenches for maintenance excellence, two Navy Unit Commendations, ten Meritorious Unit Commendations, a Coast Guard Meritorious Unit Commendation, three Navy Expeditionary Medals, an Armed Forces Expeditionary Medal, Global War on Terrorism Service and Expeditionary Medals, three Joint Meritorious Unit Citations, a NATO Medal (for Kosovo), Gold, Silver, and Bronze Anchors for retention excellence and six Chief of Naval Operations Safety Awards.

== Aircraft assignments ==
The squadron was assigned the following aircraft on the following dates:

- PB4Y-1 - August 1943
- PB4Y-2 - 1945
- P2V-4 - March 1951
- P2V-5 (MAD) - May 1954
- P2V-5F - March 1955
- P-3B - January 1966
- P-3C UII - July 1979
- P-3C UII.5 - 1993
- P-3C UIIIR - 1994
- Boeing P-8 Poseidon - 2016

== Home-port assignments ==
The squadron was assigned to the following home ports:

- NAS Norfolk, Virginia - 26 August 1943
- NAAS Oceana, Virginia - 14 October 1943
- NAS Port Lyautey, French Morocco - 21 February 1944
- Lajes Field, Azores - 20 July 1944
- NAS Edenton, North Carolina - 29 November 1945
- NAS Atlantic City, New Jersey - May 1946
- NAS Patuxent River, Maryland - 16 April 1948
- NAS Port Lyautey - March 1949
- NAS Patuxent River - 30 June 1950
- NAS Brunswick, Maine - 11 January 1952
- NAS Jacksonville, Florida - January 2010

== See also ==
- History of the United States Navy
- List of United States Navy aircraft squadrons
- List of squadrons in the Dictionary of American Naval Aviation Squadrons
