= VP-10 =

Patrol Squadron 10
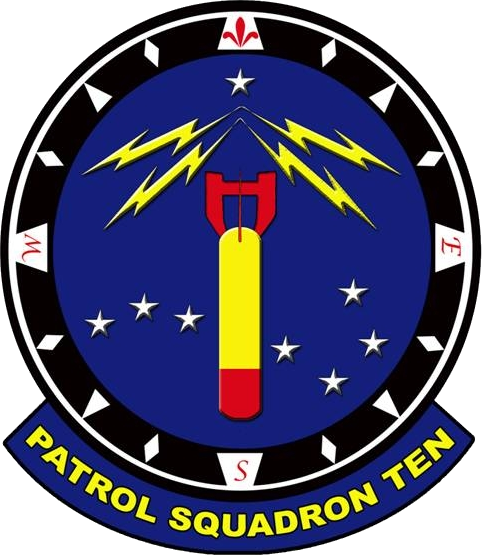
- VP-10 unit insignia
- Founded: 1952; 73 years ago
- Allegiance: United States
- Branch: United States Navy
- Type: Squadron
- Role: Anti-Submarine Warfare, Anti-Surface Warfare, Intelligence, Surveillance, and Reconnaissance, Search and Rescue
- Part of: United States Navy
- Garrison/HQ: Jacksonville Naval Air Station, Jacksonville, Florida
- Nickname(s): Red Lancers
- Motto(s): "BLEED RED!", "It never gets better!"
- Mascot(s): Redman
- Decorations: 2009/2018/2020 Battle "E", 2020 Golden Wrench Award

Commanders
- Commanding Officer: CDR Luke Huston
- Executive Officer: CDR Scott Miller
- Command Master Chief: CMDCM Lloyd Roberts

Aircraft flown
- Patrol: P-2V-2/3/5/5F; P-3A/B/C; P-8A

Patrol Squadron 10 (VP-10) is a United States Navy Patrol Squadron based at Naval Air Station Jacksonville in Jacksonville, Florida, United States. It is nicknamed the "Red Lancers" and is equipped with the Boeing P-8A Poseidon. It is the third squadron to be designated VP-10. The first VP-10 was redesignated VP-2D15 on 21 September 1927 and the second VP-10 was redesignated VP-25 on 1 July 1939.

== History ==
=== 1951-1990 ===
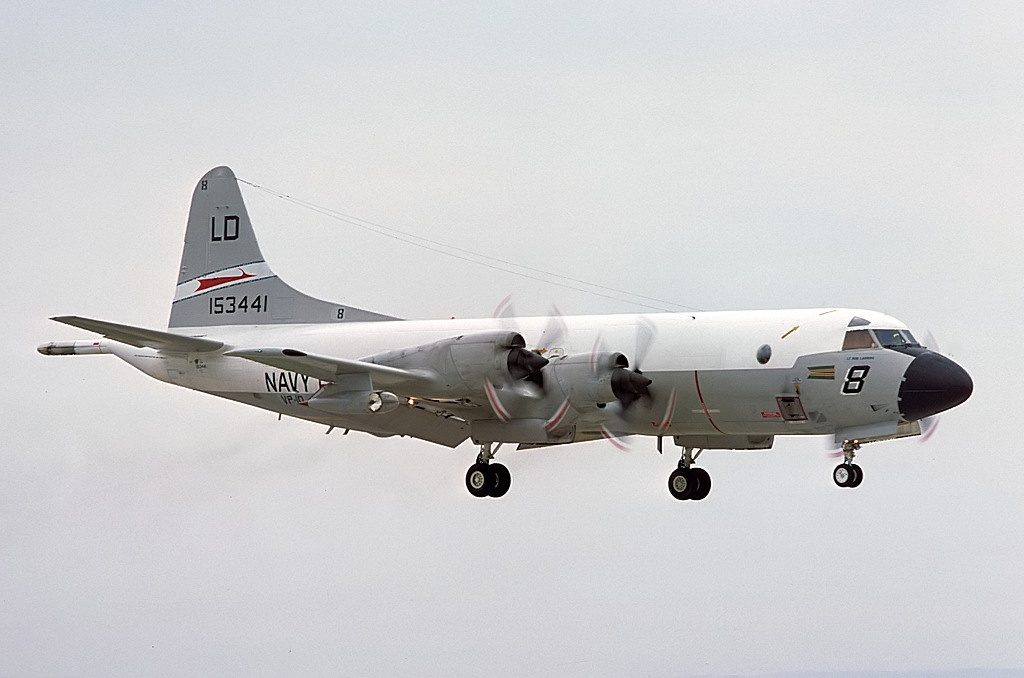
VP-10 P-3B landing at RAF Greenham Common in 1977

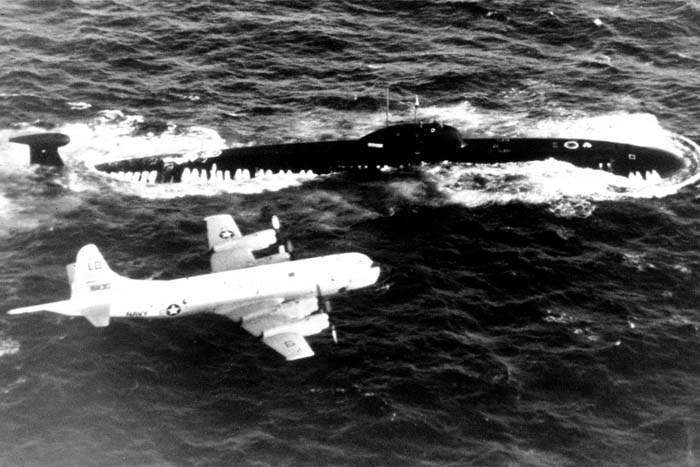
VP-10 P-3 over a Soviet Victor III submarine

- February – June 1954: VP-10 deployed to various locations in the Caribbean area during the Guatemala coup d'état and a tense revolutionary atmosphere in Central America. Detachments were located at Lajes Field, Azores, Roosevelt Roads Naval Station San Juan, Puerto Rico, NAS Guantanamo Bay, Cuba, and NAS Key West, Florida.
- October 1954: VP-10 deployed to NAS Keflavik, Iceland. During the period of Icelandic patrols, the squadron was tasked with conversion from the P2V-5 to the newer P2V-5F, which necessitated sending crews to Burbank, California, to pick up the replacement aircraft at the factory. The transition was completed prior to the return of the squadron to NAS Brunswick in January 1955.
- 1957: VP-10 deployed to NAS Argentia, Newfoundland. During the deployment the squadron participated in the annual exercise Operation Springboard at Roosevelt Roads. Before returning to home base in late 1957, the squadron flew to Thule Air Base, Greenland, to collect valuable information on the location and movement of ice formations in the northeast areas of Canada and Greenland.
- July 1958: VP-10 was split into two detachments. One detachment deployed to Iceland with six aircraft to plot the ice coverage over the Denmark Strait. During the deployment the detachment visited Norway, Denmark, Holland, England, Germany and French Morocco. The second detachment flew to Lebanon and provided support during the Lebanon Crisis. Following the end of the crisis, they visited Spain, Morocco, Italy, Greece, Libya and Malta.
- February 1959: A three-aircraft detachment visited Colombia, Ecuador, Peru and Chile. A second detachment of three aircraft visited Brazil, Uruguay, Argentina and Dutch Guyana. The flights were intended to bolster the faltering democratic governments of South American allies with a demonstration of U.S. military power and the "long reach" of Navy patrol squadrons.
- September 1960: VP-10 conducted a "Hurrivac," flying to Battle Creek, Michigan, to escape Hurricane Donna. At the end of the month, a part of the squadron deployed to NAS Argentia, Newfoundland, for one week to assist the fleet in Anti-submarine warfare (ASW) exercises.
- 6–29 January 1961: VP-10 conducted a split deployment with six aircraft deployed to Naval Station Rota, Spain, and five aircraft to Keflavik, Iceland. On 27 Jan 1961, the Rota detachment received an unusual request from the Portuguese government to assist in the search for Santa Maria, a hijacked Portuguese liner. The detachment operated briefly from the Isle DeSal in the Cape Verde Islands from 27 to 29 January 1961, before Portuguese authorities captured the ship.
- 7 November 1961: A VP-10 P2V-5F Neptune flying on ASW patrol crashed into the ocean with the loss of all 11 crewmen.
- 10 October 1962: VP-10 deployed a four-aircraft detachment to Lajes Field in support of the Cuban Quarantine.
- 13 April 1963: VP-10 flew SAR flights in an attempt to locate the missing nuclear submarine USS Thresher. After several hours of searching, a squadron aircraft spotted an oil slick at 41°43'N 64°57'W and radioed the position to surface vessels involved in the search. Remote submersible cameras located the wreckage, but all hands were lost.
- 30 January 1966: VP-10 deployed to NAS Keflavik, relieving VP-21. A detachment of the squadron also deployed to NAS Argentia. VP-10 was the first patrol squadron on that station with the P-3A Orion. The squadron transitioned to the newer P-3B upon return from deployment in June.
- 13 January 1967: VP-10 deployed to NAS Keflavik with five of its new P-3Bs. Four other crews deployed to Puerto Rico to take part in the annual Operation Springboard exercises at Roosevelt Roads. Upon completion, three aircraft deployed to Lajes Field, while the fourth rejoined the squadron at NAS Keflavik.
- 15 March 1974: The squadron lost P-3B, BuNo. 152749, in a crash at sea 41 miles (66 km) from NAS Brunswick, Maine. The crash resulted in the death of all five crew members and ended the squadron's record of 95,232 accident-free flying hours.
- 9 August 1978: VP-10 deployed to NAS Bermuda, during which the squadron received a Meritorious Unit Commendation for its achievements in tracking Soviet submarines.
- January – September 1980: The squadron began receiving the updated P-3C UII aircraft at the rate of one per month. The squadron's P-3Bs were transferred to fleet reserve squadrons.
- 2 January 1980: A detachment of P-3B Orions of VP-10 deployed to NS Rota, flew photoreconnaissance missions to locate areas damaged by an earthquake which struck the Azores the day before, killing some 50 people and injuring another 500.
- 26 July 1981: VP-10 deployed to NAS Keflavik. During the deployment the squadron was engaged in operation Ocean Venture against numerous friendly "targets." One of the players in the exercise turned out to be a Soviet Papa-class submarine that had wandered into the area while trying to conduct surveillance of the NATO surface activities. The successful exposure of the submarine and the squadron's general performance during the deployment earned VP-10 a Meritorious Unit Commendation from the Secretary of the Navy.
- 25 October – 2 November 1983: VP-10 provided several aircraft and crews for patrols in the vicinity of Grenada during the U.S. Invasion of Grenada.
- 13 September 1989: A VP-10 P-3C Orion deployed on anti-drug patrol in the Puerto Rico operating area spotted a suspicious ship in the offshore waters of the Dominican Republic. Authorities were notified and the suspects were caught on the beach 11 miles (18 km) from Santo Domingo attempting to off-load 2,930 pounds of pure cocaine.
- 1 June 1991: VP-10 deployed to NAS Sigonella, Sicily and Jeddah, Saudi Arabia. The deployment had originally been planned for the Caribbean, but two factors changed those plans abruptly at the last moment: the disestablishment of VP-44 and Operation Desert Storm.

=== 1990-2015 ===
- January - July 1993: Deployed to NAS Roosevelt Roads, Puerto Rico in support of counter-drug operations in the Caribbean.
- August 1994 - February 1995: Deployed to NAS Sigonella, Sicily in support of NATO operations Sharp Guard and Deny Flight in the Adriatic Sea related to the conflict in the former Yugoslavia.
- In 1996, VP-10 transitioned to the P-3C Update III. After completing transition to the P-3C Aircraft Improvement Program (AIP) in late 1998, the squadron deployed to the European theater of operations in support of the Kosovo War and were the first to conduct P-3 overland strike operations.
- In the 2000s, VP-10 deployed multiple times in support of Operation Enduring Freedom and Operation Iraqi Freedom, and more recently, maritime security and anti-piracy operations in support of Combined Joint Task Force – Horn of Africa.
- In 2005, the Base Realignment and Closure Commission recommended that Brunswick Naval Air Station be closed and the squadron be moved to Naval Air Station Jacksonville. The squadron completed the home port change in December 2009 following their return from a combined Central and Africa Command deployment.

=== 2015 - present ===
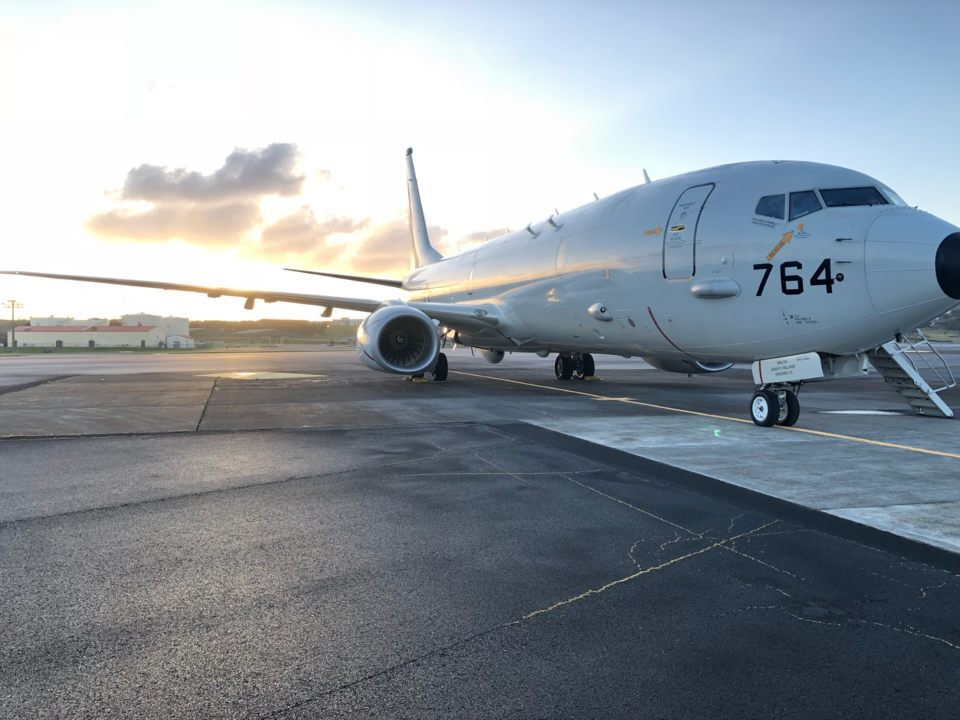
VP-10 P-8A Poseidon at Lajes, Portugal

- March 2015: The squadron started the transition to the P-8A Poseidon, their first transition in 50 years.
- September 2015: VP-10 completed the transition to the P-8A and completed a 12-month Fleet Readiness Training Plan in preparation for an upcoming deployment to United States Seventh Fleet.
- September 2016: The Red Lancers departed Jacksonville on their inaugural P-8A deployment to United States Seventh Fleet. The squadron provided critical intelligence through Maritime Domain Awareness, Intelligence, Surveillance and Reconnaissance, and Anti-Submarine Warfare flights. In the span of six months, VP-10 detached to 16 different locations, conducted over 652 sorties, and flew over 3,600 hours in the Pacific theater.
- 2017: During their inter-deployment Fleet Response Training Plan (FRTP) training period, the Lancers conducted numerous operational detachments. In the Fall of 2017, Lancers flew P-8's on Humanitarian Assistance and Disaster Relief (HADR) missions in Texas, Florida and U.S. Virgin Islands after Hurricanes Harvey, Maria, and Irma. During the same time, VP-10 also surged aircraft and crews to support TASW operations in Europe. In November, VP-10 sent an aircraft and personnel to Argentina to help search for the stricken submarine ARA San Juan. That effort led to a Meritorious Unit Citation for the squadron.
- 2018: VP-10 deployed to the United States Sixth Fleet Area of Responsibility, flying nearly 5,000 hours while conducting ASW, ISR, CSG support, Theatre Security and Cooperation, and numerous NATO and Allied exercises in over a dozen detachments to 9 countries. VP-10 was awarded the 2018 Battle Effectiveness Award.

== Aircraft assignments ==
The squadron was assigned the following aircraft, effective on the dates shown:

- P-2V-2 - March 1951
- P-2V-3 - 1952
- P-2V-5 - 1954
- P-2V-5F - December 1954
- P-2V-5F Mod - October 1960
- P-3A - July 1965
- P-3B - January 1967
- P-3C UII - January 1980
- P-3C UII.5 - 1993
- P-3C UIIIR - 1995
- P-8A - 2015

== Home port assignments ==
The squadron was assigned to these home ports, effective on the dates shown:

- NAS Jacksonville, Florida - 10 March 1951
- NAS Brunswick, Maine - February 1952
- NAS Jacksonville, Florida - December 2009

== See also ==
- History of the United States Navy
- List of Lockheed P-3 Orion variants
- List of United States Navy aircraft squadrons
- List of squadrons in the Dictionary of American Naval Aviation Squadrons
