= VP-44 (1951–1991) =

Patrol Squadron 44
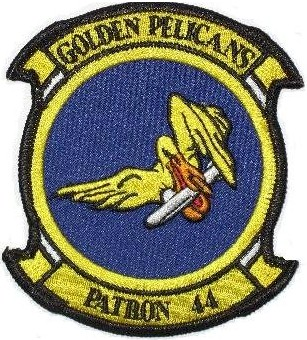
- VP-44 insignia
- Active: 29 January 1951 – 28 June 1991
- Country: United States of America
- Branch: United States Navy
- Type: squadron
- Role: Maritime patrol
- Nickname(s): Golden Pelicans; Budmen
- Engagements: Korean War; Vietnam War

Aircraft flown
- Patrol: PBM-5 Mariner; P5M-1 Marlin; P-2 Neptune; P-3 Orion

This VP-44 was a long-lived Patrol Squadron of the U.S. Navy. The squadron was established on 29 January 1951 at NAS Norfolk, Virginia and disestablished 40 years later, on 28 June 1991, at NAS Brunswick, Maine. Units of the squadron made 40 major overseas deployments. Its nickname was the Golden Pelicans from 1961 to 1991, and it was also known as the Budmen from 1989 to 1991. The squadron had four different insignia during its lifetime, featuring a marlin, King Neptune, a cartoon pelican, and, finally, a more formal pelican design. It was the fourth squadron to be designated VP-44, the first VP-44 was redesignated as VP-61 on 6 January 1941, the second VP-44 was redesignated VPB-44 on 1 October 1944 and the third VP-44 was disestablished on 20 January 1950.

== Operational history ==
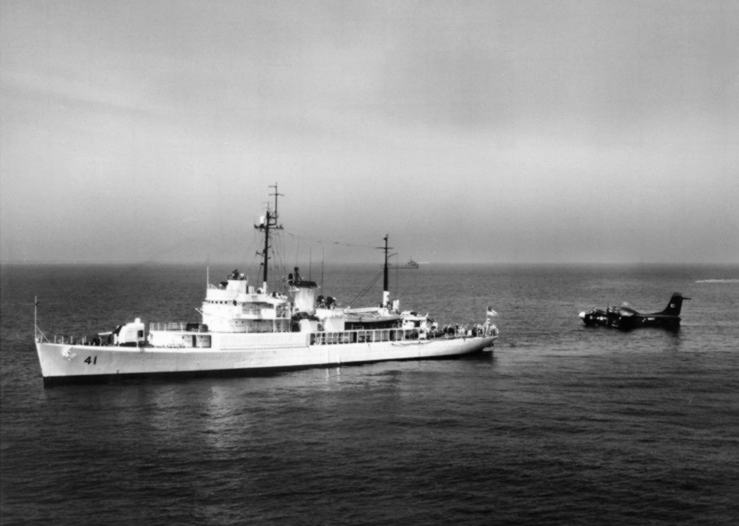
USS Greenwich Bay refuels a VP-44 Martin P5M-2 Marlin on 24 May 1955. Greenwich Bay is wearing the white paint of a Middle East Force flagship.

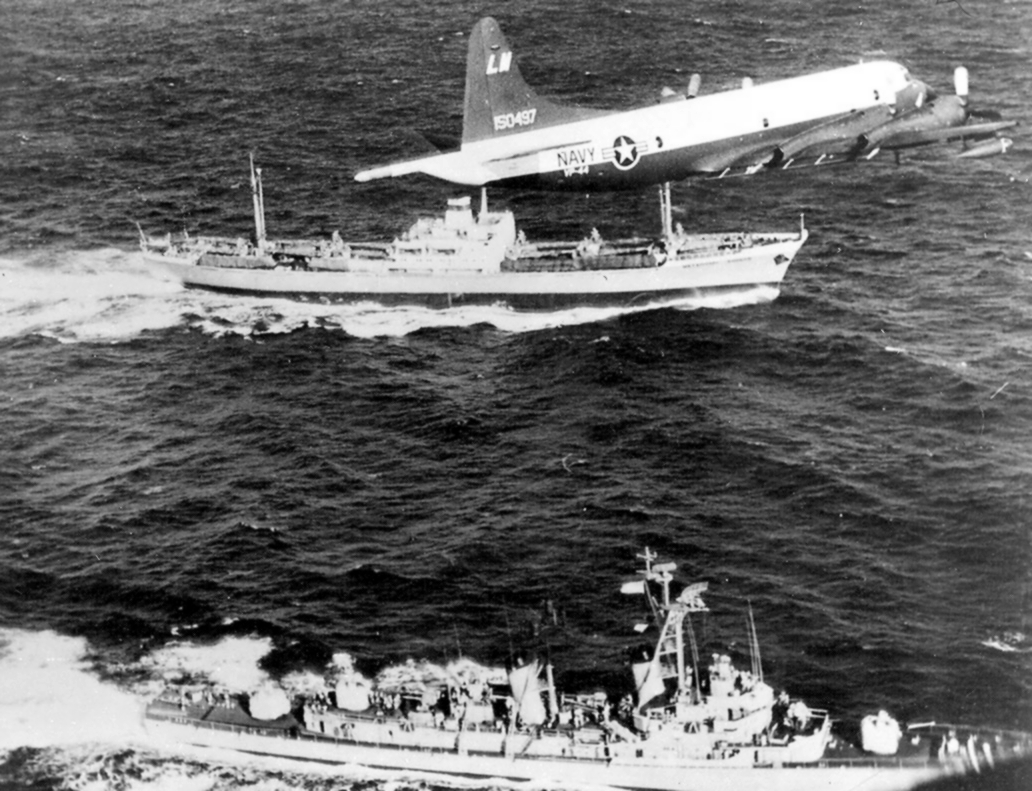
VP-44 P-3A flies over the Soviet ship Metallurg Anasov and destroyer USS Barry during the Cuban Missile Crisis

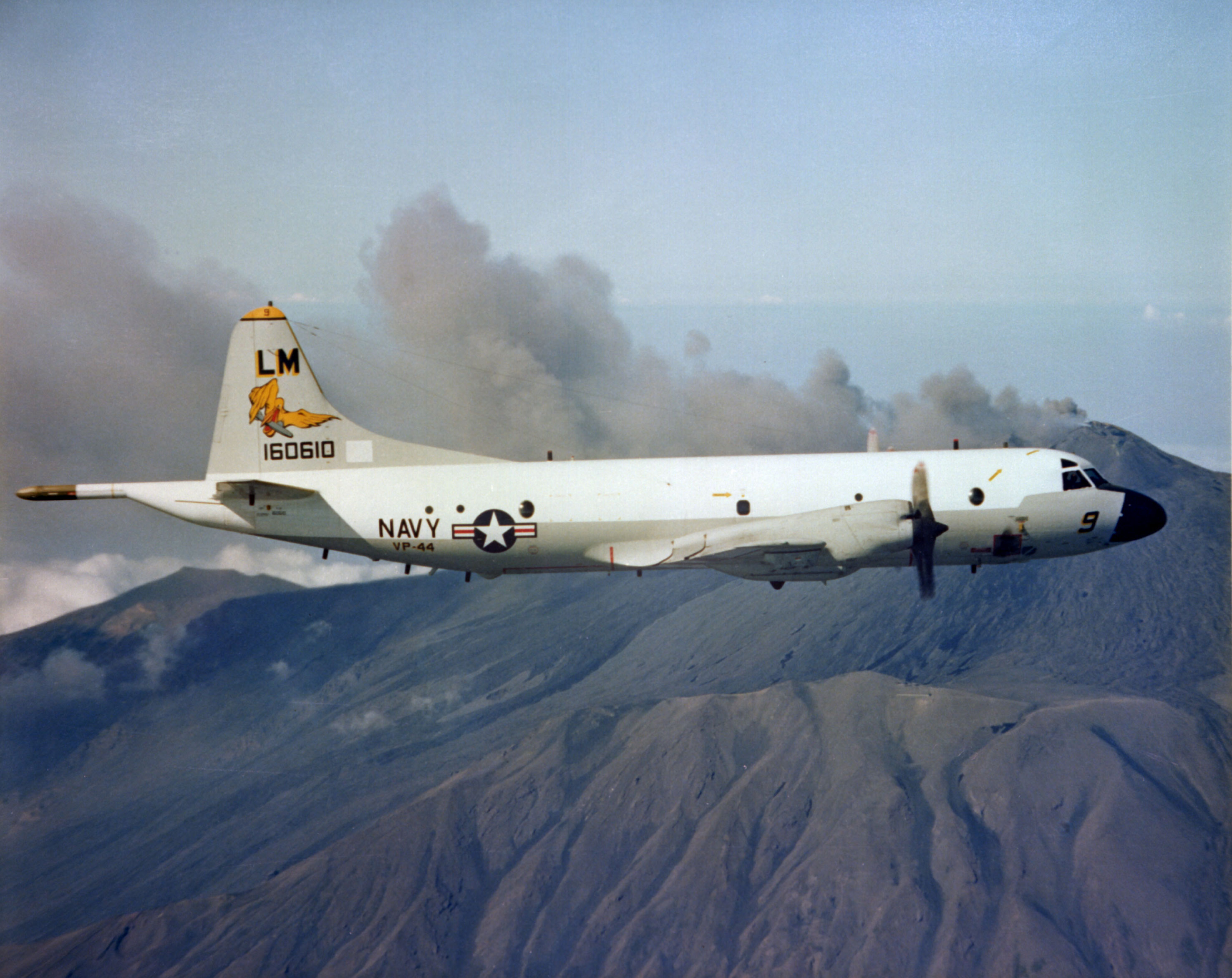
VP-44 P-3C flying past Mount Etna, Italy, in the 1980s.

- 29 January 1951: VP-44 was established at Breezy Point, NAS Norfolk, Va., as a seaplane squadron equipped with nine Martin PBM-5 Mariners, under the operational control of FAW-5. Upon arrival, new aircrews were sent to NAS Corpus Christi, Texas, for flight training.
- May–August 1951: VP-44 deployed to Naval Air Station Bermuda to fly patrol and convoy flights during Convex Two fleet exercises. When the exercises concluded in June, the squadron proceeded to San Juan, Puerto Rico, where it received seaplane tender support from USS Timbalier. A detachment of six aircraft was maintained at Naval Station Argentia, Newfoundland, through August 1951, when the squadron returned to NAS Norfolk, Va.
- January–March 1952: VP-44 deployed to Bermuda for advanced base operations. During the deployment crews were sent to Baltimore, Md., for training on the P5M-1 Marlin. In March, a detachment was sent to Cuba for operations supported by USS Duxbury Bay. The squadron returned to NAS Norfolk in March 1952.
- 23 April 1952: VP-44 received its first P5M-1 Marlin, becoming the first squadron to operate the aircraft. It had a better turning circle, newer antisubmarine warfare (ASW) and radar equipment, sturdier hull design, and more powerful engines than the PBM series.
- 13 July 1953: The squadron experienced its first casualties when Crew 10 crashed at sea after developing engine trouble. Seven out of the aircraft's eleven crewmembers were lost in the crash.
- 15 July–September 1954: VP-44 deployed to Pembroke Dock, Wales, for 15 days of operations supported by USS Currituck. The squadron departed Britain for the Mediterranean Sea in early August. After visiting numerous ports in the Mediterranean the squadron returned to NAS Norfolk on 6 September 1954. This deployment marked the first occasion that the P5M Marlin had been flown "across the pond" to Europe.
- January–June 1955: VP-44 received the first of its new T-tail P5M-2 Marlins, so named due to the placement of the horizontal stabilizer at the top of the vertical tailplane instead of the base as in earlier models. In addition to improved power and endurance, the new aircraft were supplied with magnetic anomaly detection (MAD) gear to round out the electronic capabilities of the squadron. The squadron received its full complement of aircraft by 1 June.
- February 1955: VP-44 conducted experiments in refueling from a submarine while underway. The tests, in which a specially equipped P5M-1 was towed by a moving submarine tanker, were judged highly successful.
- February 1955: VP-44 made nationwide television news when the media learned that the squadron had been alerted to investigate a submarine contact off Nags Head, N.C. The sighting stirred public fears generated by the developing Cold War. The 30-minute response from the squadron in getting airborne and its 24-hour readiness made a positive impression on the public. The initial contact was made by a VP-44 P5M during a training flight about 50–100 miles off the Virginia coast. The sub was running with its snorkel exposed while moving slowly north. It was immediately reported to VP-44 base . Other VP-44 aircraft were sent to track the sub as it moved north. When it moved out of the area other east coast squadrons continued the track. The sub reportedly disappeared somewhere off New England.
- 7–11 May 1956: Four P5Ms formed a test detachment to operate in open sea using a submarine as a floating base. The Marlins refueled from the tanker submarine USS Guavina off Dry Tortugas Island, Key West, and Tampa, Florida. The exercise was designed to give seaplanes mobility in areas where bases were not established, and to allow the squadron's tender to stay submerged to avoid enemy detection. Guavina carried aviation fuel in her stern tanks, berthed the aircrews on board, fed them, provided logistical support, and carried a limited supply of spare parts and ordnance.
- 1 May 1959: Under the terms of the still existing lend-lease agreement, the French Navy was leased a full squadron of ten P5M Marlins. VP-44 was tasked with training the officers and enlisted personnel at NAS Norfolk. Upon completion of their training, the French Maritime Patrol Squadron flew to their home base at Dakar, West Africa.
- 13 February 1960: Lieutenant R.W. Myers and crew were forced to make an emergency landing in the open sea 360 miles out from San Juan, Puerto Rico, when the starboard engine of their P5M-2, LM-8, caught fire. The crew extinguished the fire and Lieutenant Myers began taxiing the aircraft toward the nearest land, Grand Turk Island, Bahamas, some 200 miles away. USS Abbot followed the plane during the 23-hour taxi. At Grand Turk Island the tender USS Albemarle refueled the plane and then sailed with her as the plane taxied at 10 knots on its one good engine to Guantanamo Bay Naval Base, Cuba. The seaplane taxied about 520 miles in two and one-half days, setting a world record for open sea taxiing.
- December 1960: VP-44 began to transition from the P5M to the P-2V Neptune, a land-based aircraft. Crews were given training at NAS Jacksonville, Florida, with the squadron becoming operational in April 1961.
- 4 October 1961: VP-44 deployed to NAS Sigonella, Sicily, where it participated in numerous fleet exercises in the Mediterranean Sea and Project Mercury in the Atlantic.
- 1 April–13 August 1962: VP-44 received a change of permanent duty station when it was designated the second Atlantic Fleet patrol squadron to receive the P3V-1 (later redesignated the P-3A). The squadron moved from NAS Norfolk to NAS Patuxent River, Maryland. VP-44 received the first new P3V aircraft on 13 August. The squadron was declared operational in October.
- 20 October 1962: Defense Secretary Robert S. McNamara called for a buildup of active duty and reserve units in support of potential operations against Cuba. He later stated that "what was important in connection with the Cuban crisis was patrol aircraft. We had to locate and we didn’t know the location of every Soviet ship moving toward the Western Hemisphere. It was a tremendous operation. It required both Air Force aircraft and Navy aircraft to do it. We were short of each". VP-44 achieved international recognition of sorts when aircraft LM-4 was photographed flying close surveillance over the Russian freighter Anasov during the return of Soviet missiles to the USSR. Anasov was the only Russian vessel refusing to uncover all of the missiles lashed to the deck. VP-44 aircraft verified that eight large oblong objects, which appeared to be missiles, were located on its deck and the ship was allowed to proceed.
- 27 May 1968: VP-44 were among the patrol squadrons and other naval units called upon to assist in the search for the ill-fated USS Scorpion, last heard from on 21 May, 50 miles south of the Azores. The futile search was called off on 5 June.
- 10 July 1970: VP-44 received a change of permanent duty station relocating them from NAS Patuxent River to NAS Brunswick, Maine. The squadron then came under the operational control of FAW-3. Within a year FAW-3 at NAS Brunswick was disestablished and FAW-5 was moved from NAS Norfolk to NAS Brunswick, comprising the patrol squadrons stationed at that location and NAS Patuxent River.
- 15 July 1970: The squadron was tasked with a split deployment to Naval Station Rota, Spain, with the remaining portion at NAS Brunswick settling into its new home. During the deployment VP-44 was called upon to provide support to the fleet during the Black September in Jordan, resulting in the remainder of the squadron being ordered to NS Rota to augment 6th Fleet forces. The squadron's efforts earned its first Meritorious Unit Citation.
- 24 February–May 1971: VP-44 relieved VP-8 at NAS Bermuda, with a detachment of four aircraft and four aircrews based at Naval Station Roosevelt Roads, Puerto Rico. On 22 April, VP-44 sent a detachment of three aircraft and four aircrews to NAS Guantanamo Bay, Cuba, to maintain 24-hour surveillance on the coast of Haiti after the death of President Francois Duvalier. On 29 April, the detachment was relocated to NS Roosevelt Roads, and reduced to night coverage only. The detachment concluded operations on 6 May and returned to NAS Bermuda.
- 18 April–October 1972: VP-44 conducted a split deployment to NS Rota and NAF Lajes, Azores, relieving VP-45. Additional detachments were temporarily based as needed at Soudha Bay, Crete, for work with the fleet in the Mediterranean Sea. On 3 June, aircraft BuNo 152182 from the Rota Detachment crashed into the mountainous terrain near Jesbel Musa, Morocco. All 14 crewmen were killed. No cause for the crash could be determined.
- May-November 1973 VP-44 deployed to NAS Bermuda. On 2 July VP-44 "Hurrivacated" to NAF Lajes to escape from Hurricane Alice (1973) which hit Bermuda on 4 July with 90 MPH winds.
- 12 November 1974: VP-44 deployed to NAF Rota, Spain, relieving VP-23. A detachment was maintained at Lajes, Azores. The squadron's success at ASW operations for the period earned it a second Meritorious Unit Citation.
- 3 September 1980: VP-44 deployed to NAF Kadena, Okinawa. The squadron operated throughout the western Pacific and Indian oceans providing the first Harpoon-capable aircraft for battle group support.
- 19 June–13 July 1985: VP-44 had begun the customary predeployment stand down period to allow squadron members time to spend with their families. The Soviets chose this time to conduct a summer exercise in the western Atlantic, involving a dozen nuclear ballistic and guided missile submarines, the largest ASW exercise in the Atlantic since the end of WWII. Navy patrol squadrons on the East Coast went into round-the-clock operations. As the exercise gradually wound down, VP-44 returned to their base to prepare for the coming deployment. On 13 July 1985, the squadron deployed to Rota, Spain, and Lajes, Azores, conducting tracking exercises with the fleet.
- 10 November 1986: VP-44 deployed to Naval Air Station Keflavik, Iceland, relieving VP-8. The squadron's new AN/APS-137 radar was used for the first time under operational conditions.
- 28 June 1991: VP-44 was disestablished at NAS Brunswick, Maine.

== Home port assignments ==
The squadron was assigned to these home ports, effective on the dates shown:

- NAS Norfolk, Virginia – 29 January 1951
- NAS Patuxent River, Maryland – 1 April 1962
- NAS Brunswick, Maine – 10 July 1970

== Aircraft assignment ==
The squadron first received the following aircraft on the dates shown:

- PBM-5 Mariner – January 1951
- P5M-1 Marlin – April 1952
- P5M-2 Marlin – January 1955
- P2V-3 Neptune – December 1960
- P3V-1/P-3A Orion – August 1962
- P-3C UII Orion – May 1978

== See also ==
- Maritime patrol aircraft
- List of inactive United States Navy aircraft squadrons
- List of United States Navy aircraft squadrons
- List of squadrons in the Dictionary of American Naval Aviation Squadrons
- History of the United States Navy
