= VP-21 (1943–1969) =

Patrol Squadron 21
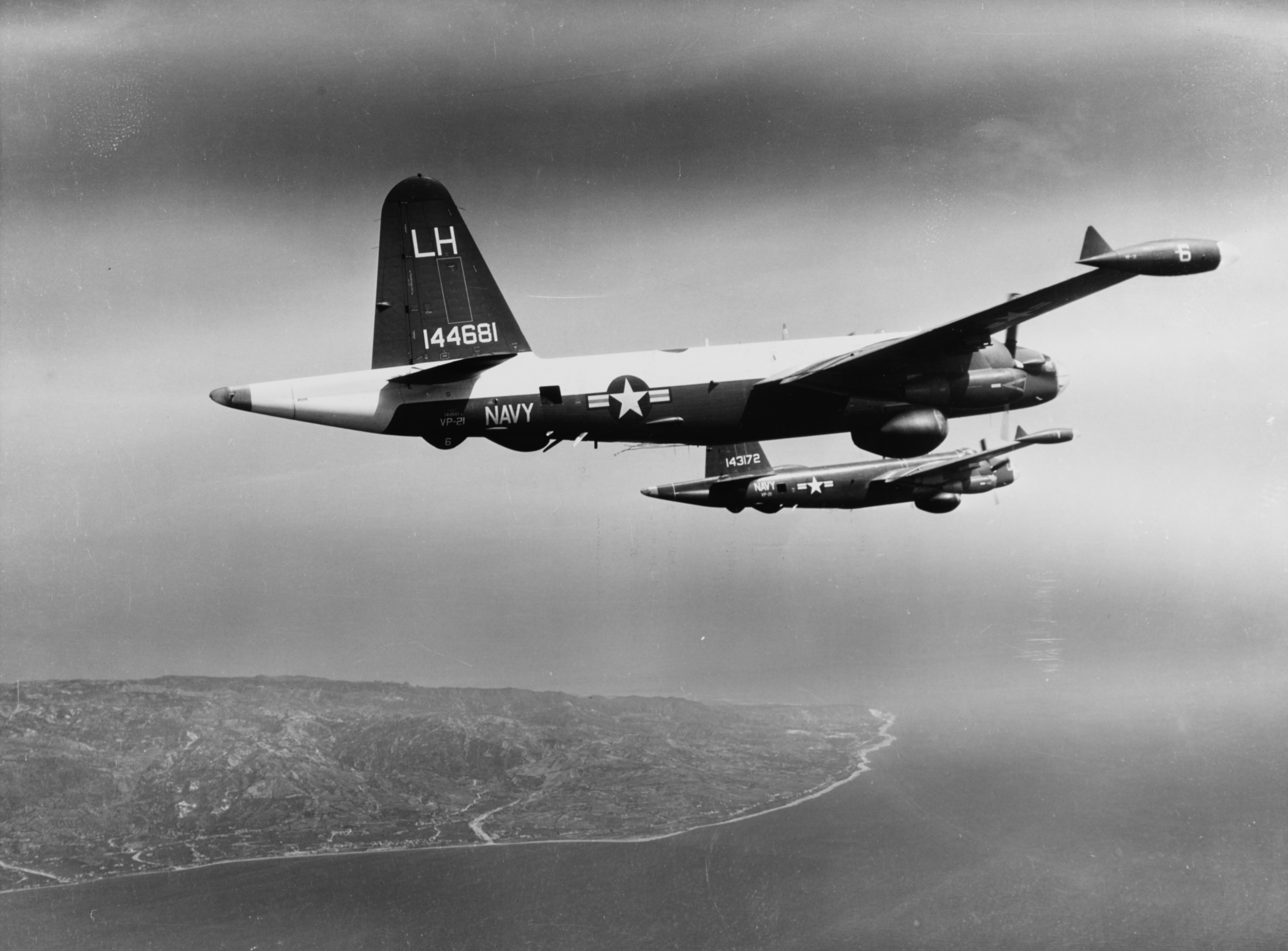
- VP-21 SP-2Hs over NAS Argentia in 1963
- Active: 30 July 1943 – 21 November 1969
- Country: United States of America
- Branch: United States Navy
- Type: squadron
- Role: Maritime patrol
- Nickname(s): Black Jacks
- Engagements: World War II

Aircraft flown
- Patrol: PB4Y-1; PB4Y-2; P4M-1; P2V-6/5F/7S/SP-2H

VP-21 was a Patrol Squadron of the U.S. Navy. The squadron was established as Established as Bombing Squadron 111 (VB-111) on 30 July 1943, redesignated Patrol Bombing Squadron 111 (VPB-111) on 1 October 1944, redesignated Patrol Squadron 111 (VP-111) on 15 May 1946, redesignated Heavy Patrol Squadron (Landplane) 11 (VP-HL-11) on 15 November 1946, redesignated Patrol Squadron 21 (VP-21) on 1 September 1948 and disestablished on 21 November 1969. It was the fifth squadron to be designated VP-21, the first VP-21 was redesignated VP-45 on 1 July 1939, the second VP-21 was redesignated VP-1 on 30 July 1940, the third VP-21 was disestablished on 18 April 1942 and the fourth VP-21 was redesignated VPB-21 on 1 October 1944.

== Operational history ==
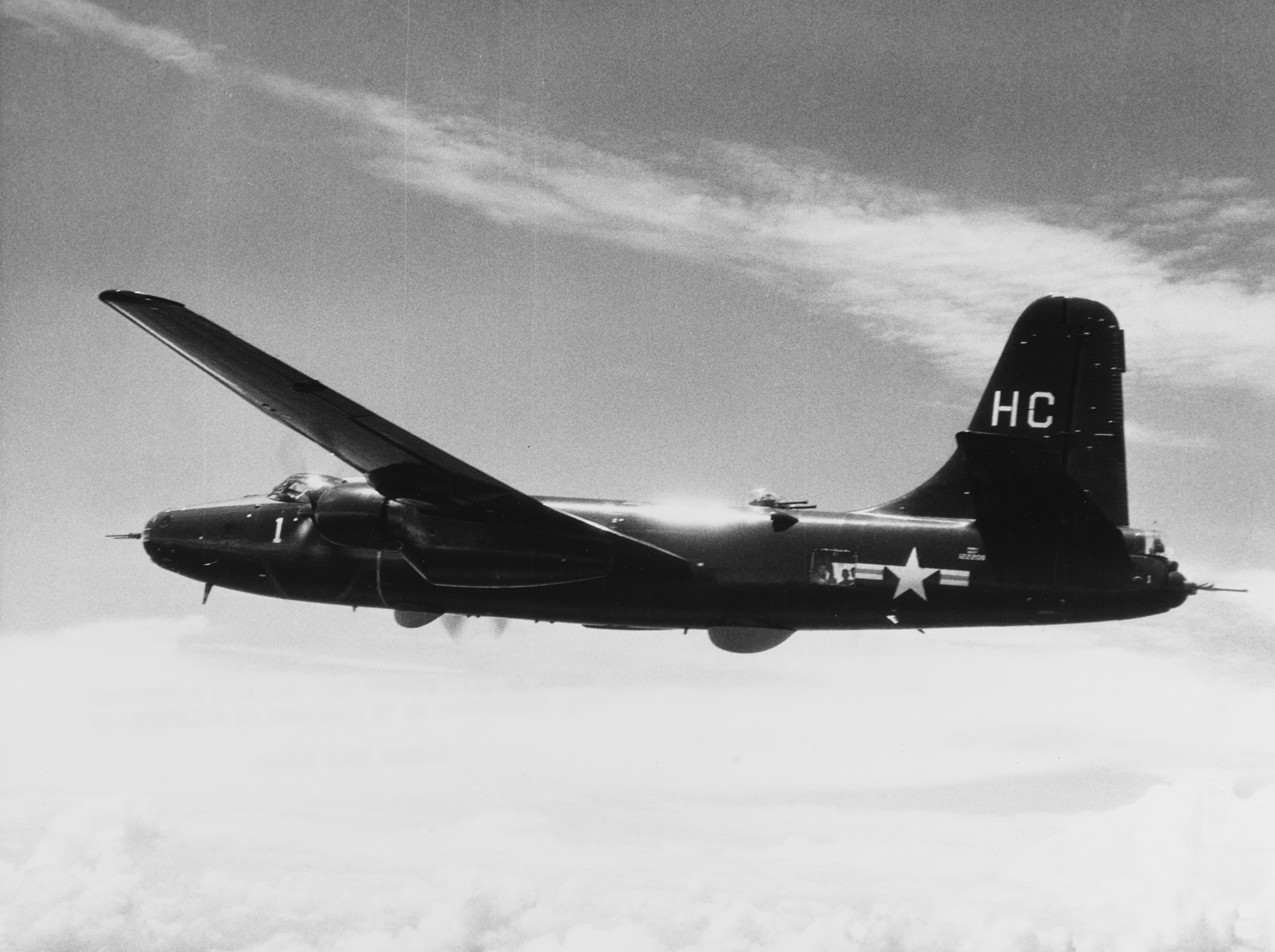
VP-21 P4M-1 in 1950

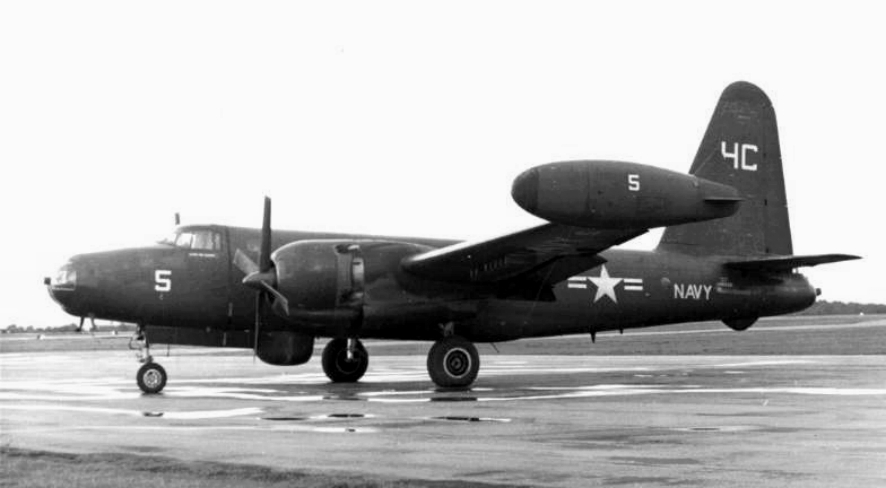
VP-21 P2V-6 at Blackbushe Airport in September 1954

- 30 July 1943: VB-111 was established at Naval Air Station Norfolk, Virginia. Half of the personnel from VP-201 formed the cadre of the new squadron. The next day a new commanding officer was designated and all personnel began relocating to NAAS Oceana, Virginia, for training in the PB4Y-1 patrol bomber. Operational control of the squadron came under Fleet Air Wing 5.
- 15 August 1943: Six crews were sent to San Diego, California, to pick up half of the squadron’s allotment of aircraft. After their arrival the crews completed their familiarization training using auxiliary fields at Naval Auxiliary Air Station Chincoteague, Virginia, and Marine Corps Air Station Cherry Point, North Carolina.
- 1 October 1943: The squadron received its orders to deploy to RAF St. Eval, England, under the operational control of FAW-7.
- 4 November 1943: VB-111 transferred to Naval Air Station Port Lyautey, French Morocco, under the operational control of FAW-15, to guard the western approaches to Gibraltar.
- 8 February 1944: The squadron had its first contact with the enemy on this date, carrying out an attack on a German U-boat. Postwar records indicate no enemy losses on that date.
- 2 March 1944: Over a period of four months, sections of three aircraft at a time were transferred back to St. Eval, England, under the operational control of FAW-7. By 13 July 1944, the entire squadron was gathered at St. Eval in preparation for its return to Naval Air Station Quonset Point, Rhode Island.
- 14 July 1944: The first section of three aircraft departed England for the U.S., arriving on the 19th. The last section arrived at NAS Quonset Point on 23 July 1944. The squadron began a training program that was conducted through 19 August 1944.
- 20 August 1944: The first section of VB-111 aircraft began the transit across the U.S. to the West Coast, with the last section arriving at Naval Auxiliary Air Station Camp Kearney, California, on the 22nd. The squadron came under the operational control of FAW-14. A brief period of training for South Pacific operations was undertaken through the end of September.
- 24 September 1944: VB-111 personnel (13 officers and 102 enlisted) boarded USS Makassar Strait for transportation to Naval Air Station Kaneohe Bay, Hawaii. Aircrews began the trans-Pacific flight on 1 October 1944, with the last section arriving on 5 October 1944.
- 29 November 1944: VPB-111 was given combat indoctrination training under operational control of FAW-2 through the end of November. On the 29th, the squadron received orders to transfer to the combat zone at NAB West Field, Tinian. The last section of aircraft arrived on 1 December 1944, and the squadron came under the operational control of FAW-1. Strategic long-range searches were conducted from that location through the middle of January 1945.
- 5 January 1945: Two squadron PB4Y-1s, flown by Lieutenant Howard E. Sires and Franklin B. Emerson, spotted an attacked a midget submarine 2 miles (3.2 km) southwest of Chichijima. The submarine was sunk using 250-pound G.P. bombs and strafing with 50-caliber guns.
- 15 January 1945: The squadron and its headquarters were relocated to Naval Amphibious Base Morotai under the operational control of FAW-17, with a detachment of four aircraft at Tacloban Air Base, Leyte, Philippines, under FAW- 10. Long-range reconnaissance missions and anti-shipping patrols were carried out from both locations.
- 1 February 1945: VPB-111 began transferring personnel and assets to the Tacloban Air Base from Morotai. By 6 February 1945, the entire squadron had been relocated, with a detachment of four crews at McGuire Field, Mindoro. Long-range reconnaissance missions and anti-shipping patrols were carried out from both locations.
- 17 March 1945: The Mindoro detachment rejoined the squadron at Tacloban to prepare for the upcoming invasion of Okinawa. Interdiction cover patrols for Task Force 58 en route to Okinawa began on 21 March 1945.
- 11 April 1945: VPB-111 relocated to Palawan Army Air Field. On 1 May 1945, the squadron received several new PB4Y-2 Privateers as replacements for its worn-out PB4Y-1s. With its new and refurbished complement of aircraft, the squadron commenced a series of daytime strikes on targets along the Borneo and Malaya coasts. On one such mission on 1 June 1945 on a 2 plane photo reconnaissance of the Naval yard in the Johore strait at Singapore, a PB4Y-1 38917 from VPB-111 flown by Lt. (jg) Romayn F. Heyler teamed up with PB4Y-2 59563 from VPB-106 flown by Lt. Commander Howard F. Mears. PB4Y-2 59563 was hit in the #3 engine by 20 MM from a Japanese KI-43 Oscar during its counterclockwise recon run around Singapore, while over Malaysia. Lieutenant (jg) Romayn F. Heyler, flew through heavy enemy fire to protect its wingman for 35 minutes from an altitude of 11,000’ down to 1000’ to defend PB4Y-2 59563 while it was attempting a water landing in enemy territory, South of Singapore harbor. 13 to 18 fighter aircraft were reported attacking the two planes. Lieutenant (jg) Heyler’s crew managed to shoot down one KI-43 Oscar and damage several others. PB4Y-2 59563’s starboard wing broke off between engines #3 & #4 at 300’ during its landing attempt. The plane rolled over in a Split S maneuver and struck the water, killing the 12 crewmen aboard PB4Y-2 59563. For his heroic actions while protecting his comrades, Lieutenant (jg) Heyler was later awarded the Navy Cross and his entire crew received the Distinguished Flying Cross.
- 7 Jul 1945: A detachment of five aircraft was sent to Mindoro, Philippines, for a two-week tour of duty, returning to Palawan on 20 July.
- 27 October 1945: After a brief period of standdown for maintenance, the squadron began the transit back to NAS Kaneohe Bay, Hawaii, and from there to the U.S.
- 24 November 1945: VPB-111 concluded its transit from the South Pacific to Naval Air Station New York, where crews were given leave. Over the next three months many of the wartime personnel were discharged from military service to civilian status.
- 1 March 1946: VPB-111 began a period of postwar reforming and retraining of new crews at Naval Air Station New York.
- June 1946: The squadron was designated an Atlantic Fleet Antisubmarine Warfare Squadron.
- 3 January 1949: VP-21 deployed to Guantanamo Bay Naval Base, Cuba, for training. One squadron aircraft crashed at NAS Patuxent River, Maryland, killing two crewmen.
- 28 June 1950: The squadron received its first P4M-1 Mercator. VP-21 was selected to be one of the few Navy patrol squadrons to fly the new Mercator. On 1 July 1951, the untested aircraft were flown on a 6,500 miles (10,500 km) circuit from NAS Pensacola, Florida, to San Diego and Naval Air Station Alameda, California, and Seattle, Washington. During the test flights all of the aircraft were operational, with no down time for repair.
- 21 October 1952: The squadron gave a demonstration of the P4M-1’s capabilities to Chief of Naval Operations and Bureau of Aeronautics officials, which included minelaying to show the bomber’s ability to carry 13,000 pounds of mines in an internal bomb bay.
- February 1953: VP-21 replaced its P4M-1s with P2V-6 Neptunes, carrying the latest equipment for minelaying and anti-submarine warfare (ASW), a steerable nose wheel and reversible pitch propellers.
- 1 August 1958: The squadron’s primary mission was changed from aerial minelaying to ASW.
- 8 July 1958: VP-21 deployed to RAF Hal Far, Malta. During the deployment, the squadron provided support during the 1958 Lebanon crisis from 15 July to 1 October 1958. VPs 21 and 10 provided ASW coverage to the Sixth Fleet during the crisis.
- 1 January 1967: Six VP-21 aircraft deployed to Naval Station Rota, Spain, relieving VP-24. From 6 to 23 June 1967, the Rota detachment deployed four aircraft to Souda Bay, Crete, for advanced base operations during the Six-Day War.
- 21 November 1969: VP-21 was disestablished at NAS Brunswick, Maine.

== Aircraft assignments ==
The squadron was assigned the following aircraft, effective on the dates shown:

- PB4Y-1 - August 1943
- PB4Y-2 - May 1945
- P4M-1 - June 1950
- P2V-6 - February 1953
- P2V-5F - August 1953
- P2V-7S/SP-2H - December 1957

== Home port assignments ==
The squadron was assigned to these home ports, effective on the dates shown:

- Naval Air Station Norfolk, Virginia - 30 July 1943
- Naval Auxiliary Air Station Oceana, Virginia - 1 August 1943
- Naval Air Station Port Lyautey, French Morocco - 4 November 1943
- Naval Air Station Quonset Point, Rhode Island - 23 July 1944
- Naval Air Station Kaneohe Bay, Hawaii - 5 October 1944
- Naval Amphibious Base Tinian - 1 December 1944
- Naval Amphibious Base Morotai - 15 January 1945
- Naval Amphibious Base Tacloban, Philippines - 1 February 1945
- AAF Palawan - 11 April 1945
- Naval Air Station New York, New York - 24 November 1945
- Naval Air Station Atlantic City, New Jersey - 23 May 1946
- Naval Air Station Patuxent River, Maryland - 11 May 1948
- Naval Air Station Brunswick, Maine - 26 May 1954

== See also ==
- Maritime patrol aircraft
- List of inactive United States Navy aircraft squadrons
- List of United States Navy aircraft squadrons
- History of the United States Navy
