= Great State of Maine Air Show =

Annual airshow in Brunswick, Maine

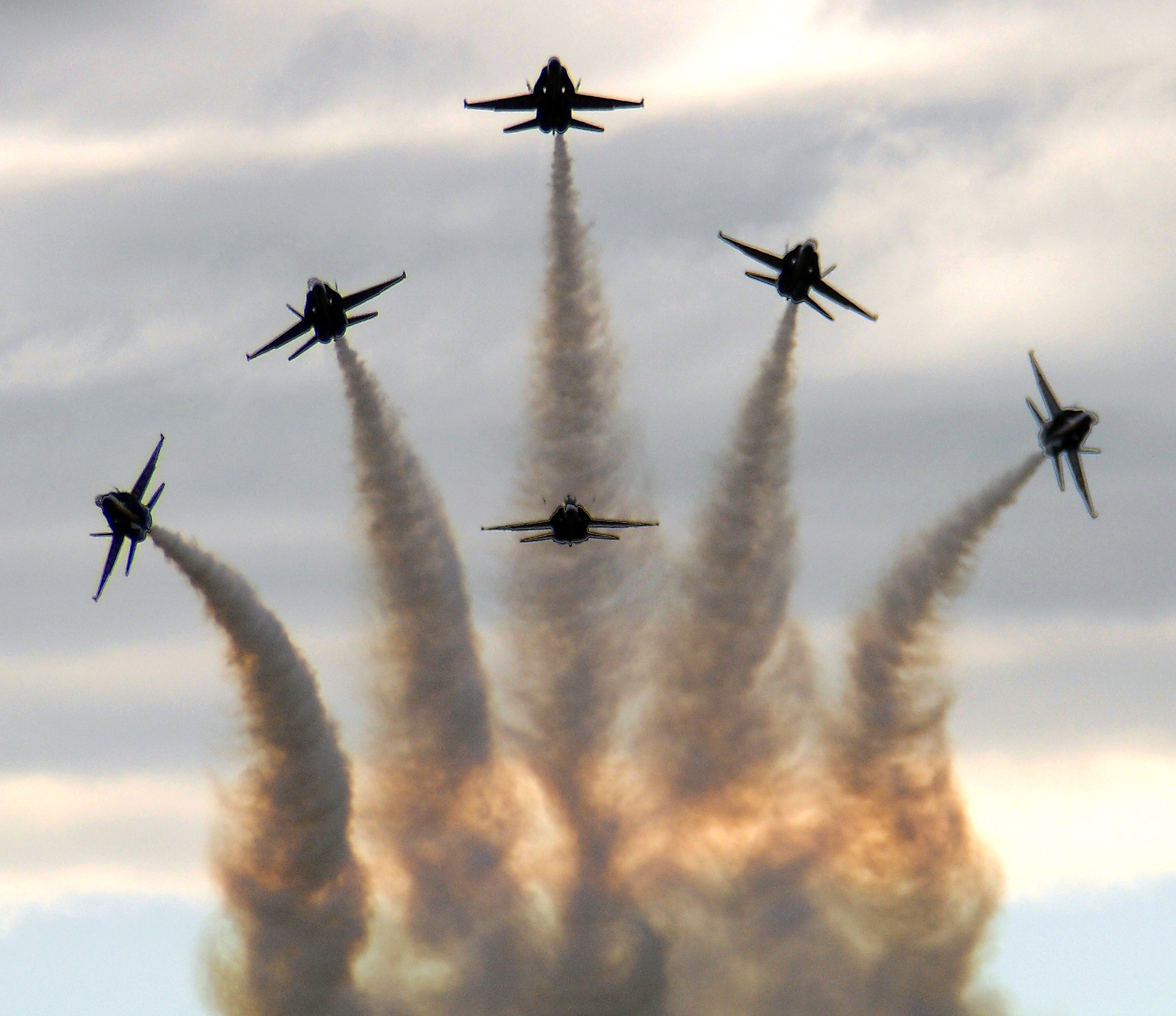
- Blue Angels at the show
- Genre: Air show
- Venue: Brunswick Executive Airport
- Location: Brunswick, Maine
- Country: United States
- Website: Official website

The Great State of Maine Air Show is an airshow held in August at Brunswick Executive Airport in Brunswick, Maine. After being run for a number of years by Naval Air Station Brunswick, the event returned in 2011 with an all-volunteer base.

== Event History ==
Air Shows took place at Naval Air Station Brunswick on random years throughout the 1980s, 1990s and early 2000s organized by the United States Navy and featuring dozens of military and civilian aerial performers. The 33rd Annual Great State of Maine Air Show which took place in 2008 was expected to be the last, as Brunswick was expected to be closed by the 2005 Base Realignment and Closure process. A record number of 150,000 people showed up for the two-day event. The Base was officially decommissioned on 31 May 2011 with an onsite ceremony. On the same year it was announced that the Great State of Maine Air Show would return to the skies of Brunswick on August 26 and 27 of 2011, It would be organized and put-up by an all-volunteer base without the participation from the US Military. The show would take place on the same location as before as the Naval Station had become Brunswick Executive Airport. Despite not being organized by the Military, the United States Navy Blue Angels were still to be featured at the Show after their first appearance in Maine since 2007. The United States Air Force also supported the event with the A-10 Thunderbolt II Demonstration and a USAF Heritage Flight. Civilian aerobatic and warbird performances rounded out the rest of the show. Military Static Displays were canceled due to Hurricane Irene which was moving towards the south. Despite some bad weather, the Show was still an overall success. The next show took place on August 25 and 26, 2012 with an additional night Air Show on August 24, it was headlined by the USAF Thunderbirds and also featured the F/A-18C Hornet Demonstration from the US Navy. The Texas Flying Legends Museum which is based at Wiscasset Airport for part of the year, brought over a restored B-25 Mitchell, P-51D Mustang, P-40 Warhawk, F4U Corsair, and one of only two flyable Mitsubishi A6M Zeros to the Show and participated in a warbird flight that involved mock-aerial combat. The planned 2013 Show was canceled due to Budget Cuts in Congress known as sequestration. The show did not take place in 2014 either because the organizers failed to book a head-lining military act. That year however, the Blue Angels announced their 2015 schedule which included the Great State of Maine Air Show.
