= VP-11 =

Patrol Squadron 11
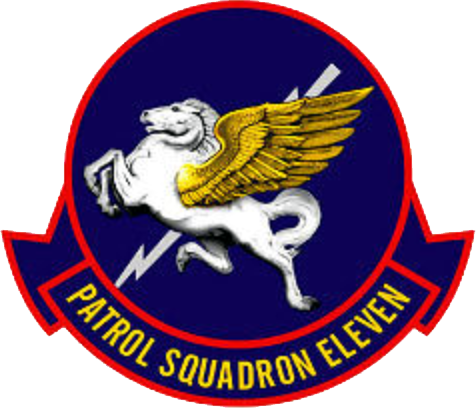
- Squadron insignia
- Active: 15 May 1952 - 2 August 1997
- Country: United States of America
- Branch: United States Navy
- Type: Squadron
- Role: Maritime patrol
- Part of: United States Navy/Naval Air Forces/Patrol Wing
- Garrison/HQ: Brunswick Naval Air Station, Brunswick, Maine
- Nickname: Proud Pegasus

Aircraft flown
- Patrol: P4Y-2 Privateer; P2V-5/7 SP-2H Neptune; P-3B/C Orion

Patrol Squadron 11 (VP-11), nicknamed Proud Pegasus, was a Patrol Squadron of the U.S. Navy. The squadron was established at NAS Quonset Point, Rhode Island on 15 May 1952 and was disestablished on 2 August 1997. It was the fourth squadron to be designated VP-11, the first VP-11 was redesignated VP-54 on 1 October 1937, the second VP-11 was redesignated VP-21 on 1 February 1941 and the third VP-11 was redesignated VPB-11 on 1 October 1944.

== Operational history ==
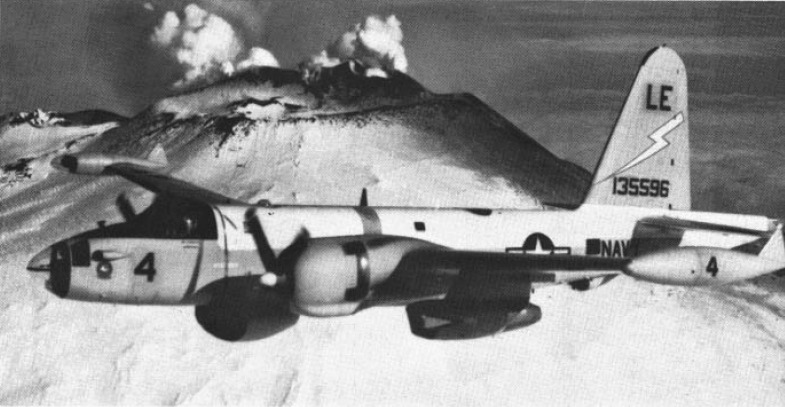
VP-11 SP-2H over Mount Etna c.1965

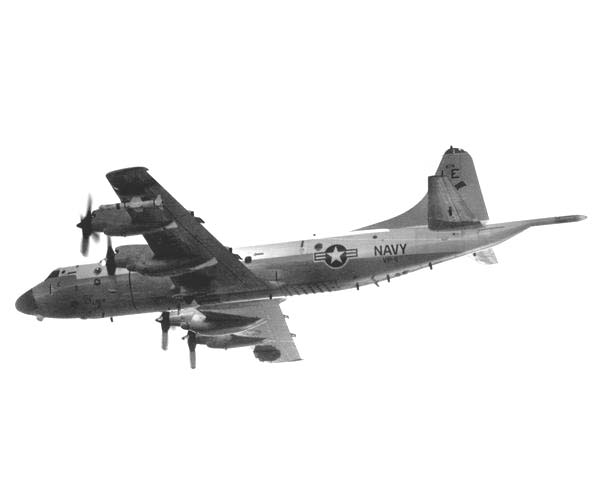
VP-11 Harpoon-armed P-3C c.1988

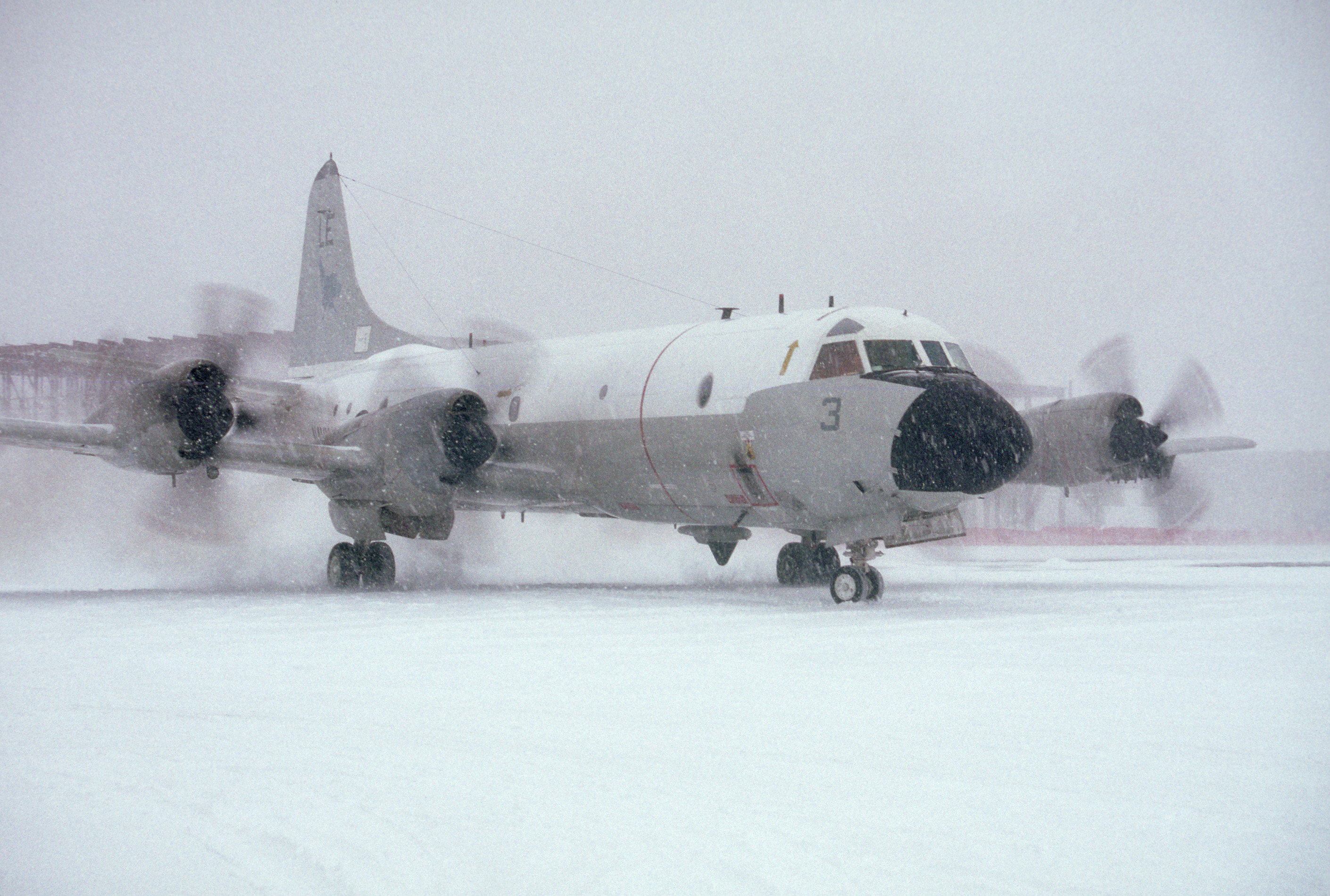
VP-11 P-3C in snow at NAS Brunswick in December 1991

- 15 May 1952: VP-11 was established at NAS Quonset Point, with a complement of 12 P4Y-2 Privateer patrol aircraft.
- January–June 1953: VP-11 conducted its first deployment to Naval Station Argentia, Newfoundland. Upon return, the squadron was assigned new P2V-5 Neptunes as replacements for the WWII vintage Privateers.
- November 1960–March 1961: VP-11 participated in underwater sound tests (Project Breezeway) with the Office of Naval Research from November to December 1960. The squadron was again called upon to assist in tests of new sonobuoy equipment during January to March 1961.
- 8 February 1962: A detachment of VP-11 at NAS Argentia, Newfoundland, began ice reconnaissance flights over the Gulf of St. Lawrence to aid in evaluating satellite readings of the ice formations transmitted by TIROS 4 which was put into orbit the same day.
- 24 October–14 November 1962: VP-11 deployed to NAS Argentia, Newfoundland, on 12 hours’ notice during the Cuban Missile Crisis. Surveillance flights totaling 1,065 flying hours were conducted through 14 November 1962.
- 6 May–19 August 1965: VP-11 conducted around-the-clock surveillance operations with nine aircraft operating out of Guantanamo Bay, Cuba, during the Dominican Civil War. Operations ceased on 3 June 1965 and all but four aircraft returned to NAS Brunswick. The remaining four aircraft and crews continued surveillance in the Caribbean until 19 August 1965.
- 12 October 1967: VP-11 deployed to Naval Air Station Keflavik, Iceland. The squadron was awarded a Navy Unit Commendation for its Anti-submarine warfare (ASW) activities during that period of operations. It was the first time the award had been given to a patrol squadron not in a combat zone.
- 14–26 September 1969: Elements of VP-11 participated in a NATO exercise Operation Squeezeplay, conducted from St. Mawgan, England.
- 23 July 1972: VP-11 received emergency deployment orders to WestPac. The squadron departed NAS Brunswick for NAS Cubi Point, Philippines, arriving 26 July. A small detachment was maintained at U-Tapao Royal Thai Navy Airfield, Thailand. Upon arrival in the Philippines the squadron’s deployment was greatly impeded by record rainfall of 74.4 inches. Despite the difficulties, the squadron was able to conduct assigned sector patrols of the South China Sea and Gulf of Tonkin. For its humanitarian efforts during disaster relief operations in the Philippines, the squadron was awarded a Philippine Presidential Unit Citation.
- 25 October 1973: The last P-3B DIFAR upgrade on the squadron’s aircraft was completed on this date. VP-11 was the last East Coast P-3 squadron to be fitted with DIFAR, which replaced the 10-year-old JULIE system for detection and tracking of submarines.
- 14 Apr 1975: VP-11 conducted a split deployment to Naval Base Rota, Spain, and Lajes Field, Azores. During the deployment the squadron hosted officers from Canada, Iran and Norway to familiarize them with the P-3 and it operational capabilities.
- 15 October 1977: VP-11 deployed to Rota, Spain, and Lajes, Azores. On 11 December 1977, one of the squadron’ P-3Bs, BuNo. 153428, crashed into a mountain on Hierro Island, Canary Islands killing all 13 crewmembers.
- 26 July 1978: Squadron detachments participated in UNITAS operations and visited seven South American countries during the exercises.
- 23 January 1979: VP-11 conducted a split deployment to Rota, Spain, and Lajes, Azores. During the deployment the opportunity was taken to run exercise simulations against the Soviet Kiev and Minsk battle groups present in the Mediterranean Sea.
- 2 February 1981: Phase I in the transition from the P-3B DIFAR to the P-3C UII began with the training of the first increment of four VP-11 crews at NAS Jacksonville, Florida. VP-30 conducted the transition training for VP-11.
- 12 November 1981: VP-11 sent five crews to Roosevelt Roads Naval Station to participate in READEX 1-82. During the exercise the squadron had its first opportunity to fire a live Harpoon missile, successfully hitting the target.
- 13 December 1985 – 24 May 1986: VP-11 deployed to NS Keflavik, Iceland, returning to NAS Brunswick on 24 May 1986. During the deployment the squadron collected environmental data on the Marginal Ice Zone and tested the efficiency of ice-penetrating sonobuoys.
- 9 June 1987: The squadron conducted a split deployment to Rota, Spain, and Lajes, Azores. During operations in the Mediterranean Sea the squadron had numerous practice attack simulations against Iowa battle group and the Soviet Kiev battle group—the former willingly, the latter unknowingly.
- 10 November 1988: VP-11 deployed to NAS Keflavik. The first two months of the deployment were during the worst weather conditions on record for over a decade. By the end of the deployment 744 sorties had been flown, with 17 frontline Soviet submarines contacted.
- June 1989: A detachment of eight aircraft deployed to NAS Key West, Florida, to assist in anti-drug operations with Joint Task Force Four. The detachment flew over300 hours in support of task force operations, resulting in severe disruption of the drug smuggling routes into the U.S.
- 10 June 1990: VP-11 deployed to Naval Air Station Sigonella, Sicily. During the deployment the squadron flew numerous missions in support of Operation Desert Shield, which began on 2 August 1990. Two detachments were maintained for Operation Desert Shield support, one at Souda Bay, Crete, the other at Jeddah, Saudi Arabia.
- 4 January 1992: VP-11 conducted a split deployment to NS Roosevelt Roads and NAF Rota. The detachment at Roosevelt Roads flew many missions in support of national drug control strategy. As the lead squadron, the detachment was responsible for the detection and monitoring of aerial and maritime transit of illegal drugs into the U.S. The detachment’s participation in the operation resulted in the seizure of 10,000 kilos of cocaine and 20 tons of marijuana.
- 1993: VP-11 conducted another split deployment with detachments at Sigonella, Sicily, and Jeddah, Saudi Arabia. The squadron flew over 250-armed sorties in the Adriatic Sea in support of UN resolutions against the former Republic of Yugoslavia. The squadron was the first to carry the new AGM-65 Maverick missile on patrol aircraft.
- 17 June 1994: VP-11 deployed to NS Roosevelt Roads. During the deployment the squadron flew numerous missions in support of the United States Coast Guard and United States Customs Service. Operations resulted in 29 interdictions, 13 vessels seized and 77 narcotics traffickers arrested. A total of 12,000 kilos of cocaine and 45,000 pounds of marijuana with an estimated street value of over $1 billion was destroyed.
- 12 January 1996--1 June 1996. VP-11 deployed to Sigonella, Sicily. For this deployment the squadron was awarded the Navy's Meritorious Unit Commendation for over 4,500 hours of air support to Joint and US commanders throughout the Mediterranean Region and Africa. In specific, the MUC cites aircrews and maintenance for achievements in armed undersea warfare, combat tactical reconnaissance support overland the former Yugoslavia (Operations: Joint Endeavor, Sharp Guard, and Decisive Enhancement) and direct overhead support to special operations units while conducting the evacuation of the US embassy and American citizens in Liberia (Operation: Assured Response).
- 15 January–2 August 1997: VP-11 was disestablished. The disestablishment ceremony was held at NAS Brunswick, Maine, on 2 August 1997.

== Home port assignments ==
The squadron was assigned to these home ports, effective on the dates shown:

- NAS Quonset Point, Rhode Island - 15 May 1952
- NAS Brunswick, Maine - 1954

== Aircraft assignment ==
The squadron first received the following aircraft on the dates shown:

- P4Y-2 Privateer – May 1952
- P2V-5 Neptune – June 1953
- P2V-7 Neptune – 1956
- SP-2H Neptune – December 1962
- P-3B Orion – January 1967
- P-3B DIFAR Orion – October 1973
- P-3C UII Orion – 1981
- P-3C UII.5 Orion – 1993

== See also ==
- History of the United States Navy
- List of inactive United States Navy aircraft squadrons
- List of United States Navy aircraft squadrons
- List of squadrons in the Dictionary of American Naval Aviation Squadrons
- Brunswick Naval Air Station
