= Naval Air Station Brunswick =

Former military airport in Brunswick, Maine, United States

- Brunswick, Maine in the United States
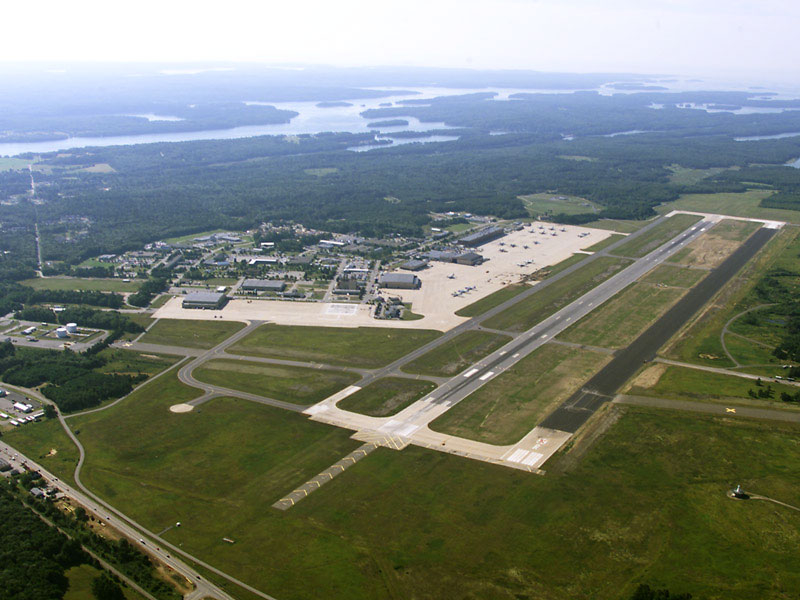
- An aerial view of NAS Brunswick during 2008

Site information
- Type: Naval air station
- Owner: Department of Defense
- Operator: US Navy
- Condition: Closed
- Website: Official website (archived)

Location
- Location in the United States
- Coordinates: 43°53′32″N 069°56′19″W

Site history
- Built: 1943
- In use: 1943 – 1946 and 1951 – 2011
- Fate: Transferred to civilian use to become Brunswick Executive Airport and location of new campus for Southern Maine Community College

Airfield information
- Identifiers: ICAO: KNHZ, FAA LID: NHZ, WMO: 743920
- Elevation: 23 metres (75 ft) AMSL
Runways
Direction	Length and surface
1L/19R	2,438 metres (7,999 ft) Asphalt
1R/19L	2,438 metres (7,999 ft) Asphalt

Naval Air Station Brunswick (IATA: ~~NHZ~~, ICAO: KNHZ, FAA LID: NHZ), also known as NAS Brunswick or the Brunswick Naval Air Station, was a military airport located 2 miles (3.2 km) southeast of Brunswick, Maine, with a number of Navy-operated maritime patrol aircraft. As of November 28, 2009, the last aircraft (P-3 Orions) left. The runways were permanently closed in January 2010. The base operated while the airport operated publicly under the name Brunswick Executive Airport until the base closed on May 31, 2011, as per the 2005 Base Realignment and Closure committee decision. Since then, the base is known as Brunswick Landing. The Midcoast Regional Redevelopment Authority has been managing base redevelopment with a high-tech business and industrial park. On April 2, 2011, the airport reopened as Brunswick Executive Airport.

== History ==
The Brunswick airport was originally built in 1935 by the New Deal agency the Maine Emergency Relief Administration, a state division of the Federal Emergency Relief Administration after a survey of airports in the state by Capt. Harry M. Jones with the intention of building a chain of airports in coastal towns, inland towns, and lake resorts. It built one NW–SE 1800 x 50 gravel runway and 1 E–W 1800x100 graded runway.

=== World War II ===
Naval Air Station Brunswick was developed and occupied in March 1943, and was first commissioned on April 15, 1943, to train and form-up Royal Navy Fleet Air Arm squadrons with Vought Corsairs, Grumman Avengers and Grumman Hellcats. The 1,487-acre (6 km^{2}) station was built, in part, on land that was donated by the town of Brunswick. By the early 1940s, the town was using most of this land to operate a small municipal airport, which would become the core of the air station.

Operating under the motto, "Built For Business", the first U.S. squadron to arrive at NAS Brunswick was a heavier-than-air Scouting Squadron (VS1D1). During World War II, pilots from NAS Brunswick as well as those of the Royal Navy's Fleet Air Arm used the station as a base from which they carried out anti-submarine warfare missions with around-the-clock efficiency. The air station had a contingent from the Fleet Air Arm, but the squadrons also practiced at other Naval Auxiliary Air Facilities (NAAF) in Maine before eventual transport to Britain. The station was supporting the Casco Bay NAAF seaplane base on Long Island from May 14, 1943, to December 15, 1946, and auxiliary landing fields Lewiston NAAF until December 1, 1945, Sanford NAAF until February 1, 1946, Rockland NAAF until March 15, 1946, and Bar Harbor NAAF from September 1, 1943, until November 15, 1945. On August 15, 1945, Japan surrendered to Allied forces, ending the war. As a result, NAS Brunswick was scheduled for deactivation.

=== Cold War ===
The air station was deactivated in October 1946, and the land was reverted to caretaker status, and the land and buildings leased jointly to the University of Maine and Bowdoin College. When the station’s facilities were no longer required, the two colleges terminated their leases, and in 1949 operations at NAS Brunswick were taken over by the Brunswick Flying Service. This commercial deviation was short-lived, however, after the Navy selected the station as a potential center for development of "Services to the Fleet". Plans were soon placed on the drawing boards to make this a thriving operational air station.

On March 15, 1951, the National Ensign was hoisted, re-commissioning the station as a Naval Air Facility. The station soon became a beehive of activity, as it was slated to become a Master Jet Base. New construction around the base was begun which included dual 8,000-foot runways, and new facilities to replace the temporary structures of World War II, including a modern operations tower capable of handling all the complex flights of a full-scale Naval Air Station. Two outlying fields were also planned to be built, one for gunnery and one for carrier practice landings.

On June 15, 1950, North Korea on Chinese authorization crossed the 38th parallel and invaded their neighbors in South Korea. Acting quickly and on little notice, the American military reversed the post-World War II trend of reduction-in-forces and several subordinate commands stationed at NAS Brunswick were re-commissioned. While not directly involved in combat operations in Korea, its squadrons contributed to the war effort by assuming the many responsibilities of commands who had been deployed to the Pacific.

In 1959, NAS Brunswick’s primary mission was support of Fleet Air Wing Three which was composed of Patrol Squadrons Seven, Ten, Eleven, Twenty One, Twenty Three, and Twenty Six. Flying the P2V Neptune and PB4Y-2 Privateer, the squadrons played a major part in the defense of the North Atlantic area, tracking Soviet submarines around the clock throughout the Cold War.

In 1962, NAS Brunswick and Fleet Air Wing Five began the transition to the P-3A Orion marking the beginning of a new era in Naval Patrol Aviation. During the Cuban Missile Crisis in October 1962 and more encompassing, during the entirety of the Cold War between American and Soviet forces, both the P2V and P-3A became nationally well-known due to their surveillance of Soviet ships in the Atlantic Ocean, leading to a safe resolution.

Fleet Air Wing Five aircraft also played an important part in America’s early crewed space programs in 1965 and 1966, helping to locate Mercury and Gemini capsules after splashdowns.

In 1966, Wing Five began deployments in the Western Pacific. Based at Naval Station Sangley Point in the Philippines, squadrons flew patrol and combat missions in support of Seventh Fleet operations in South East Asia throughout the years of U.S. involvement in Vietnam.

On August 2 of 1990, Iraqi president Saddam Hussein launched an invasion on the neighboring country of Kuwait. In response, the United States launched a wholly defensive mission to the Middle East named Operation Desert Shield. Patrol Squadron Twenty Three was the first East Coast maritime patrol squadron in-theater for Operation Desert Shield, providing maritime surveillance throughout the Red Sea. Patrol Squadron EIGHT participated in joint operations during Desert Storm, flying combat sorties in the effort to liberate Kuwait from Iraqi forces.

=== Post Cold War ===
At the end of the Cold War in 1991, many maritime patrol squadrons were reduced or relocated. Combat Wing Five disestablished Patrol Squadron 44 in May 1991, Patrol Squadron 23 in December 1994 and Patrol Squadron 11 in August 1997.

During the mid-1990s, with the breakup and subsequent conflict in the former Republic of Yugoslavia, Patrol Squadrons 8, 10, 11, 26 from NAS Brunswick were called upon to fly countless sorties in the Adriatic Sea in support of Operation Sharp Guard. Of specific note, Patrol Squadron 10 was the first VP squadron to conduct offensive missile attacks since Vietnam in the 1970s. In 1994, 10,138 enlisted, officers, civilian employees, and family members called NAS Brunswick home.

In the early years of the new millennium, squadrons home ported at NAS Brunswick continued to fulfill their missions by flying intelligence, surveillance, reconnaissance and maritime patrol sorties in Operation Joint Guardian in Kosovo and Operation Deliberate Forge in Bosnia in support of U.S. and NATO forces. Following the September 11, 2001 terrorist attacks against the U.S., those same squadrons began flying missions in support of Operation Enduring Freedom (OEF) in the Middle East.

NAS Brunswick-based crews flew homeland defense maritime patrols off the Atlantic coast as part of Operation Noble Eagle and additional assets were surged in support of OEF operations. Fleet Air Wing Five squadrons were present during the commencement of Operation Iraqi Freedom in 2003, and continue to fly in support of ongoing operations.

On October 21, 2008, a P-3 Orion from Patrol Wing Five overshot the runway at Bagram Air Base while landing. The aircraft caught fire and was destroyed but the only injury to the crew was one broken ankle. The aircraft was assigned to CTF-57 in Afghanistan.

=== Closure ===
After being listed on the 2005 Base Realignment and Closure list, NAS Brunswick began preparing itself for shut down with a mandated September 2011 closure date. In May 2008, Captain Will Fitzgerald relieved Captain George Womack, becoming NAS Brunswick’s 36th and final Commanding Officer, and was tasked with the responsibility of closing the base. In September 2008, NAS Brunswick hosted the 33rd Great State of Maine Air Show for the last time, which boasted an attendance of more than 150,000 people from the local area and out of state. The air show was held again in August 2017, without the support of a military base. In November 2008, the Patrol Squadron 8 Tigers were the first Fleet Air Wing Five squadron to permanently leave NAS Brunswick on deployment, scheduled to return to their new home port of NAS Jacksonville, Florida. May 2009 saw the last squadron Changes of Command held on base when the reins of the Patrol Squadron 26 Tridents and the Fleet Logistics Support Squadron 62 Nor’Easters (having since been renamed the Nomads) were handed over to new Commanding Officers. In June 2009, the "Red Lancers" Patrol Squadron 10 departed Brunswick for their new home port of NAS Jacksonville, followed by Special Projects Patrol Squadron 1 and Fleet Logistics Support Squadron 62 in July. The last squadron to leave NAS Brunswick was Patrol Squadron 26, which made their final departures late November 2009. Prior to its closure, there were approximately 1681 officers, sailors, and civilian employees actively working on base.

December 23, 2009, marked the last day of Navy Reserve activity at NAS Brunswick when the Navy Operational Support Center lowered the National Ensign and closed its doors for the last time. Captain Scott F. Walton, the NOSC Commanding Officer, had previously been the last C.O. of Patrol Squadron VP-92 Minutemen, a Navy Reserve squadron made up of many local Maine citizens. VP-92 operated out of NAS Brunswick from 1996 to 2007.

At an onsite ceremony on May 31, 2011, the base was officially decommissioned. Navy officials handed over the remaining property to the Midcoast Regional Redevelopment Authority. Property is being redeveloped for civilian use as Brunswick Landing. This started with the opening of the Brunswick Executive Airport. Southern Maine Community College has built a new campus on the site.

== Environmental problems ==
The U.S. Environmental Protection Agency declared the base a Superfund Site in 1987 for chemical contamination after open-air detonation of ordnance. From 2007 until 2015, the Navy assessed and removed ordnance from the area, spending $3–4 million on site clean-up. In July 2015, EPA declared the area safe with so called "land use controls", such as signs and fencing.

In September 2015, it became known that the Navy’s closure draft report mentioned contamination with perfluorinated chemicals (PFCs). They had been "recorded at levels above the EPA’s provisional health advisory", a number derived from lab tests on animals, at several places, many of which were associated with past use of PFC-containing fire-fighting foam, such as areas around the airplane runway and between hangars. Groundwater is contaminated at the former fire department building and the foam storage building. Restoration Advisory Board members criticized the land use control plan as insufficient, after PFCs found in well water at Pease Air Force Base in neighboring New Hampshire had exposed people including children as blood monitoring has shown. The Air Force had been testing 82 former and active installations nationwide for PFCs.

== See also ==
- South Weymouth Naval Air Station, closed in 1996
- VP-8
- VP-10
- VP-26
- VR-62
- VP-92
- VP-11
- VP-21
- VP-23
- VP-44
