= VP-92 =

Patrol Squadron 92
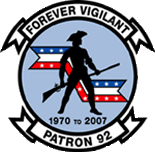
- Squadron patch celebrating 37 years of service
- Active: 14 November 1970 – 17 October 2007
- Country: United States
- Branch: United States Navy Reserve
- Type: Squadron
- Role: Anti-Submarine Patrol
- Part of: United States Naval Reserve/Naval Air Reserve Force/Reserve Patrol Wing
- Garrison/HQ: Brunswick Naval Air Station, Brunswick, Maine
- Nickname(s): Minutemen
- Patron: 92
- Motto(s): Forever Vigilant
- Decorations: 1 Meritorious Unit Commendation, 4 Armed Forces Service Medals, 1 Joint Meritorious Unit Award, 1 Chief of Naval Operations Letter of Commendation, 1 Secretary of the Navy Letter of Commendation, and the Donald M. Neal "Golden Wrench" award for maintenance excellence 3 consecutive years and 6 times overall.

Aircraft flown
- Patrol: SP-2H; P-3 Orion

Patrol Squadron 92 (VP-92) is a former U.S. Navy Reserve patrol squadron. Established on 1 November 1970, it was disestablished on 17 October 2007. It was the second squadron to be designated VP-92, the first VP-92 was redesignated VPB-92 on 1 October 1944.

== History ==
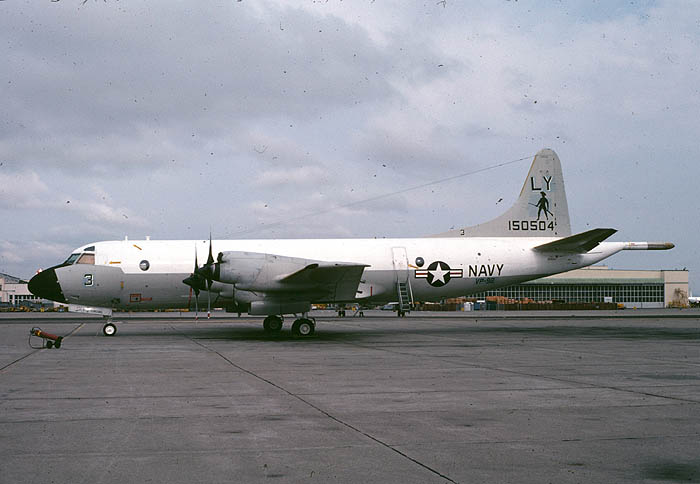
VP-92 P-3A in August 1976

- 1 November 1970: VP-92 was established at NAS South Weymouth, Massachusetts, as a naval air reserve land-based patrol squadron flying 12 Lockheed SP-2H Neptunes. The new squadron came under the operational and administrative control of Commander Naval Air Reserve Force and Commander Fleet Air Reserve Wings, Atlantic. VP-92 was established as a result of a major reorganization of Naval Air Reserve that took place in mid-1970. Under the Reserve Force Squadron concept 12 land-based naval reserve patrol squadrons were formed and structured along the lines of regular Navy squadrons with nearly identical organization and manning levels. The 12/2/1 concept had 12 VP squadrons under two commands, COMFAIRESWINGLANT and COMFAIRESWINGPAC. These two commands came under the control of one central authority, Commander Naval Air Reserve.
- October 1973: During the Yom Kippur War one VP-92 aircraft was called upon to transport priority parts for A-4 aircraft to the Israeli Air Force. Task Forces 60.1, 60.2, 61 and 62 were placed on full alert for possible evacuation contingencies in the Middle East. On 19 October 1973, 50 A-4 aircraft were flown from the U.S. to Israel to replace heavy losses from ground-to-air missiles.
- 26 January–24 February 1991: VP-92 became the first reserve patrol squadron to assume all operational commitments at NAS Bermuda rather than just an augment squadron. The change in responsibilities came about as a direct result of the reduced Soviet presence in the North Atlantic, and the reassignment of active duty assets to more critical areas. Seven reserve patrol squadrons trained throughout the year at the naval air station. The squadrons assumed full control from the regular Navy patrol squadrons, including all aspects of supply, maintenance, routine patrol responsibilities and ready alert standby.
- 17 July–29 August 1993: VP-92 provided four aircrews and a maintenance detachment in support of Adriatic Sea embargo flights for Operation Maritime Guard against the former Republic of Yugoslavia. These were armed flights carrying Rockeye cluster bombs, Harpoon anti-ship missiles and the first highly successful deployment of the Remote Imaging Transmission System. The missions were flown in support of UN operations to enforce the cease-fire between warring factions of Bosnia, Serbia and Croatia, and to prevent outside factions from providing resupply by sea.
- 8 June 1996: VP-92 relocated with more than 1,000 Naval Reservists from NAS South Weymouth, to NAS Brunswick, Maine following the disestablishment of the NAS South Weymouth facility.

== Home port assignments ==
The squadron was assigned to these home ports, effective on the dates shown:

- NAS South Weymouth, Massachusetts - 1 November 1970
- NAS Brunswick, Maine - 8 June 1996

== Aircraft assignment ==
The squadron first received the following aircraft on the dates shown:

- SP-2H - November 1970
- P-3A DIFAR - April 1975
- P-3B TAC/NAV MOD - 1984
- P-3C UII - July 1991
- P-3C UII.5 - 1996
- P-3C UIII - 1998

== See also ==
- History of the United States Navy
- List of inactive United States Navy aircraft squadrons
- List of United States Navy aircraft squadrons
- List of squadrons in the Dictionary of American Naval Aviation Squadrons
- South Weymouth Naval Air Station
- Brunswick Naval Air Station
