= VP-44 =

Patrol Squadron 44
- Active: 15 October 1942 – 20 January 1950
- Country: United States of America
- Branch: United States Navy
- Type: squadron
- Role: Maritime patrol
- Engagements: World War II

Aircraft flown
- Patrol: PBM Mariner

VP-44 was a Patrol Squadron of the U.S. Navy. It was established as VP-204 on 15 October 1942, redesignated as Patrol Bombing Squadron VPB-204 on 1 October 1944, redesignated as VP-204 on 15 May 1946, redesignated as VP-MS-4 on 15 November 1946, redesignated as VP-44 on 1 September 1948 and disestablished on 20 January 1950. It was the third squadron to be assigned the VP-44 designation. The first VP-44 had that designation from 1 July 1940 to 6 January 1941. The second VP-44 had that designation from 3 June 1941 to 1 October 1944. A fourth VP-44 was established on 29 January 1951 and disestablished on 28 June 1991.

== Operational history ==
- 15 October 1942: VP-204 was established at NAS Norfolk, Virginia, as a seaplane squadron flying the PBM-3C Mariner. During the squadron's training period at Norfolk it came under the operational control of PatWing-5.
- 27 December 1942: The squadron was relocated to NS San Juan, Puerto Rico, for further training under the operational control of FAW-11, Caribbean Sea Frontier. Upon completion of the training syllabus in March, the squadron conducted operations from San Juan and Trinidad, flying antisubmarine patrols and convoy escort patrols. Advance base detachments were maintained during various times at Antigua; NAS Coco Solo, Panama; Essequibo, British Guiana; Cayenne, French Guiana; Paramaribo, Surinam; and Guantanamo Bay Naval Base, Cuba. Tender support for most of the operations was provided by USS Pelican.
- 28 March–7 August 1943: VP-204 aircraft attacked German U-boats on eight separate occasions. During three of the attacks, intense anti-aircraft (AA) fire from the submarines damaged the attacking aircraft. One submarine was sunk on 7 August 1943 after a running gun battle in the Caribbean southeast of Curaçao. Lieutenant (jg) John M. Erskine, pilot of a squadron PBM-3S, attacked U-615 on the surface on 6 August, causing moderate damage. The squadron conducted a hold-down of the submarine over night. On the morning of 7 August, Lieutenant Anthony R. Matuski spotted the U-boat when it surfaced and made an attack run. His aircraft was damaged by return fire and crashed, losing all hands. Lieutenant Lewis D. Crockett, flying a squadron aircraft, located the U-boat and conducted a bomb run that further damaged the vessel, but resulted in severe damage to his aircraft from AA fire. He remained on the scene until Lieutenant Holmes, pilot of a VB-130 PV-1 Ventura arrived . The two aircraft conducted a coordinated bombing and strafing attack, however, the final blow to U-615 was administered by Lieutenant (jg) John W. Dresbach, in a VP-204 Mariner, when he arrived on the scene and made a bombing and strafing attack on the U-boat. This attack resulted in mortal wounds to Dresbach, but was the final blow for the submarine. A U.S. Navy destroyer from Trinidad reached the area the next morning and rescued 45 of U-615’s crew of 49.
- 5 June 1944: After numerous submarine contacts of mid-1943, few enemy U-boats were spotted in the Caribbean by the squadron. The last attack on an enemy submarine was conducted at night on 5 June 1944 off the coast of Puerto Rico using the wingmounted searchlight. A damaged claim was submitted by the crew, but postwar examination of records indicate that the U-boat returned safely to port.
- 27 Nov 1944: The squadron was relocated to NAS Key West, Florida, with a detachment maintained at Royal Island, Bahamas, supported by USS Christiania. During this period VPB-204 came under the operational control of FAW-12, Gulf Sea Frontier. Duties consisted of convoy coverage and antisubmarine patrols.
- 3 Mar 1945: Seven officers and 23 enlisted personnel were detached for training in PBM-5 aircraft at NAAS Harvey Point, North Carolina. These aircraft were flown back in April to Key West to replace the older PBM-3S aircraft that the squadron had been flying.
- 24 May 1945: VPB-204 was transferred to NAS Coco Solo, under FAW-3, Commander Pacific Sea Frontier. The squadron became fully operational in early June, receiving several new PBM-5E aircraft to supplement its complement. Duties consisted primarily of scouting patrols off Central America.
- 4 July 1945: NAS Coco Solo, was officially designated the new home port for the squadron. As the war wound down over the ensuing months, long-range patrols gave way to an increasing number of passenger and cargo transport runs across the Caribbean.
- 1946–1949: The squadron maintained search and rescue detachments during various period at NAS Guantanamo Bay and with various seaplanetenders in different parts of the Caribbean.
- 1–20 January 1950: VP-44 moved to NAS Norfolk to prepare for disestablishment and on 20 January 1950, VP-44 was disestablished.

== Home port assignments ==
The squadron was assigned to these home ports, effective on the dates shown:

- NAS Norfolk, Virginia – 15 October 1942
- NS San Juan, Puerto Rico - 27 December 1942
- NAS Key West, Florida - 27 November 1944
- NAS Coco Solo, Panama - 24 May 1945
- NAS Norfolk - 1 January 1950

== Aircraft assignment ==
The squadron first received the following aircraft on the dates shown:

- PBM-3C Mariner – October 1942
- PBM-3S - October 1944
- PBM-5E - March 1945

== See also ==
- Maritime patrol aircraft
- List of inactive United States Navy aircraft squadrons
- List of United States Navy aircraft squadrons
- List of squadrons in the Dictionary of American Naval Aviation Squadrons
- History of the United States Navy
