= USS Simpson (FFG-56) =

Oliver Hazard Perry-class frigate

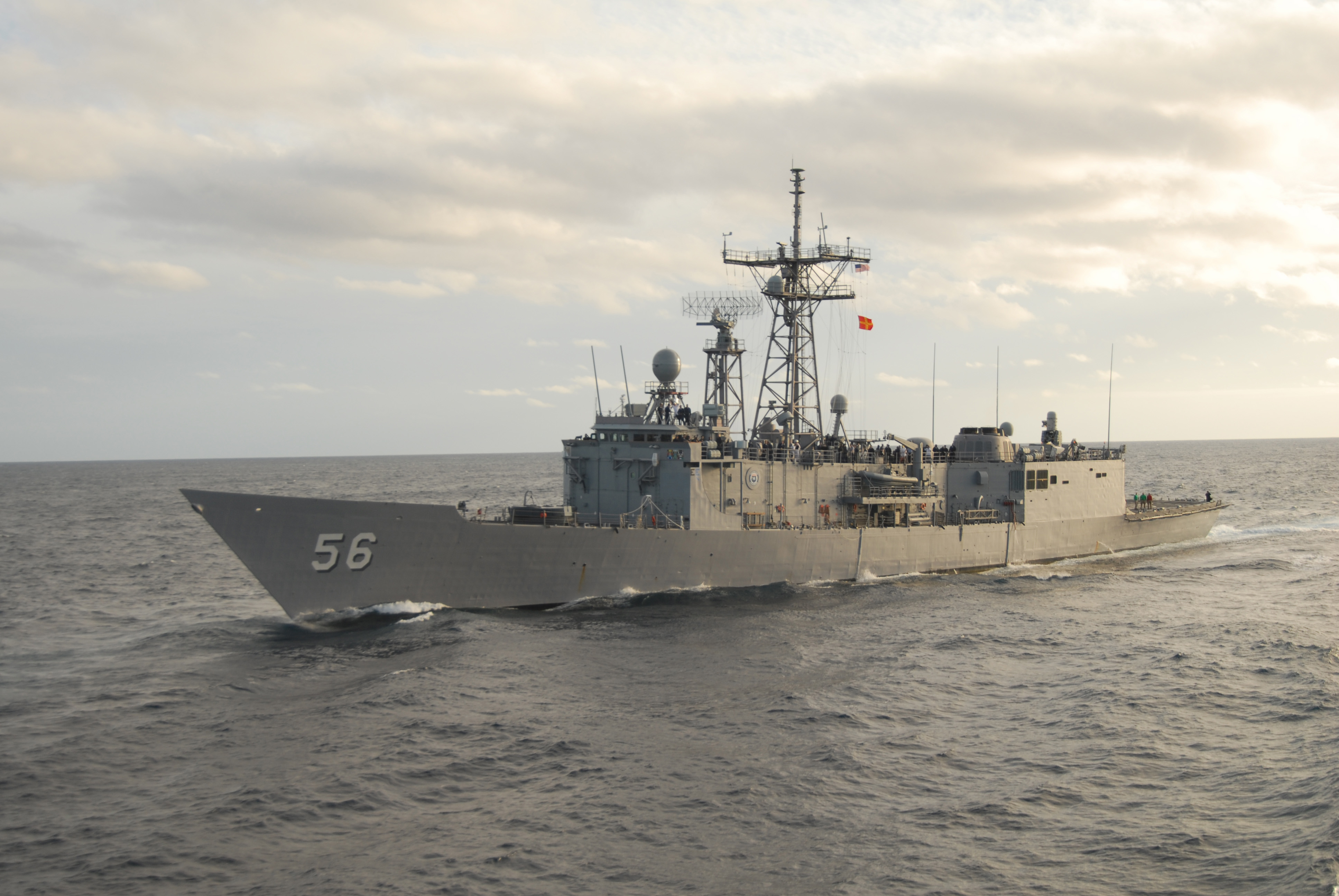
- USS Simpson in April 2007

History

United States
- Namesake: Rear Admiral Rodger W. Simpson
- Awarded: 22 March 1982
- Builder: Bath Iron Works, Bath, Maine
- Laid down: 27 February 1984
- Launched: 31 August 1984
- Sponsored by: Mrs. Grace Fowles-Simpson
- Acquired: 13 September 1985
- Commissioned: 21 September 1985
- Decommissioned: 29 September 2015
- Identification: Hull symbol: FFG-56; Code letters: NRWS
- Motto: "Attaquer en Vigueur"; ("Attack with Vigor")
- Fate: Sunk on September 28, 2025
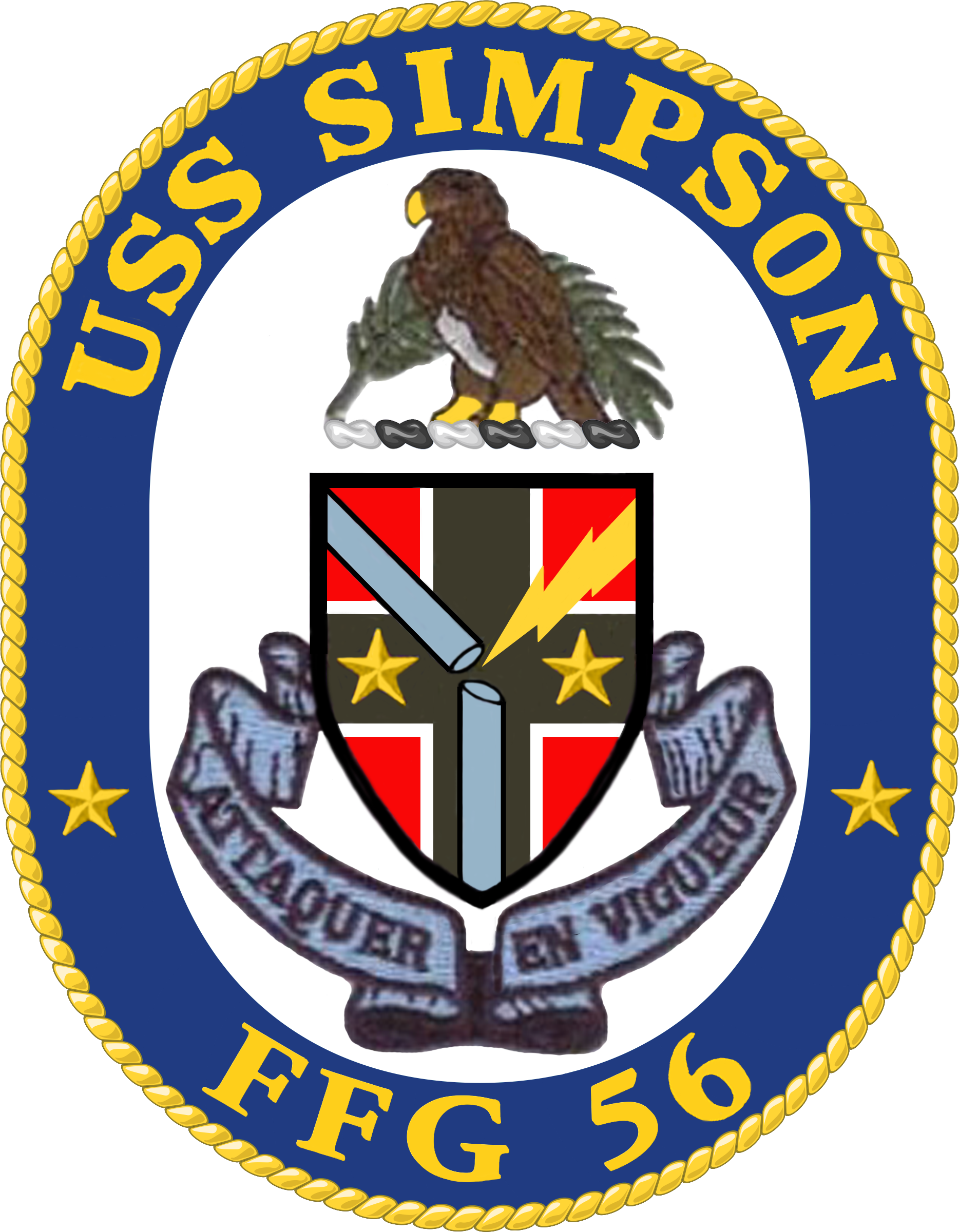
- Badge

General characteristics
- Class & type: Oliver Hazard Perry-class frigate
- Displacement: 4,100 long tons (4,200 t), full load
- Length: 453 ft (138 m)
- Beam: 45 feet (14 m)
- Draft: 22 feet (6.7 m)
- Propulsion: 2 × General Electric LM2500-30 gas turbines generating 41,000 shp (31 MW) through a single shaft and variable pitch propeller; 2 × Auxiliary Propulsion Units, 350 hp (260 kW) retractable electric azimuth thrusters for maneuvering and docking.
- Speed: over 29 knots (54 km/h)
- Range: 5,000 nautical miles at 18 knots (9,300 km at 33 km/h)
- Complement: 15 officers and 190 enlisted, plus air detachment of roughly six officer pilots and 15 enlisted maintainers
- Sensors & processing systems: AN/SPS-49 air-search radar; AN/SPS-55 surface-search radar; CAS and STIR fire-control radar; AN/SQS-56 sonar.
- Electronic warfare & decoys: AN/SLQ-32V5 with Sidekick; Mark 36 SRBOC; AN/SLQ-25 Nixie
- Armament: As built: 1 × OTO Melara Mk 75 76 mm/62 caliber naval gun; 2 × Mk 32 triple-tube (324 mm) launchers for Mark 46 torpedoes; 1 × Vulcan Phalanx CIWS; 4 × .50-cal (12.7 mm) machine guns.; 1 × Mk 13 Mod 4 single-arm launcher for Harpoon anti-ship missiles and SM-1MR Standard anti-ship/air missiles (40 round magazine); Note: As of 2004, Mk 13 systems removed from all active US vessels of this class.; Currently: 1 × OTO Melara Mk 75 mod 2 76 mm/62 caliber naval gun; 2 × Mk 32 12.75 in (324 mm) triple-torpedo-tube launchers for Mark 46, Mark 50, and Mark 54 torpedoes; 1 × Block 1B Mk 15 Phalanx 20 mm CIWS; 2 × Mk 38 25 mm cannons (only while deployed overseas); 8 × mounts for crew served weapons
- Aircraft carried: 2 × SH-60B LAMPS III helicopter
- Aviation facilities: 2 × hangars; RAST helicopter hauldown system

USS Simpson (FFG-56) was an Oliver Hazard Perry-class guided missile frigate of the United States Navy, named for Rear Admiral Rodger W. Simpson.

== History ==
Simpson was laid down at Bath Iron Works, Bath, Maine, on 27 February 1984, launched on 31 August 1984 sponsored by Mrs. Grace Fowles-Simpson widow of Rodger W. Simpson and commissioned on 21 September 1985 in Newport, Rhode Island. The ship was delivered 13 September 1985. Bath Iron Works plans called for delivery to occur 9 August 1985, but that date slipped due to an extended strike at BIW that began 30 June 1985. Simpson was homeported at Naval Station Newport until switching to Naval Station Norfolk on 31 March 1994. Simpson moved to Naval Station Mayport in July 2001.

=== 1980s ===
On 28 January 1986, the NASA John F. Kennedy Space Center in Florida, launched Space Shuttle mission STS-51L utilizing the orbiter vehicle Challenger at 1138 EST. Escaping propellant combustion products from the solid rocket booster ignited the Challenger's liquid fuel and oxidiser tank, and 73 seconds after launch a massive explosion destroyed Challenger, killing all seven astronauts on board. Simpson took part in the ensuing search and rescue effort, and subsequently received the Coast Guard Unit Commendation with Operational "O" for her participation.

Beginning January 1988, Simpson's first overseas deployment was to the Persian Gulf as part of Operation Earnest Will, to escort reflagged Kuwaiti oil tankers during the Iran–Iraq War. On 18 April 1988, Simpson took part in Operation Praying Mantis, the U.S. response to the mining of the frigate Samuel B. Roberts, which had hit an Iranian M-08 mine on 14 April 1988.

On 18 April, Simpson, along with Wainwright and Bagley, destroyed Iranian naval and intelligence facilities on the oil platform Sirri in the Persian Gulf. Later that day, the ships encountered the Iranian Kaman-class (La Combattante II type) missile patrol boat Joshan, which launched a Harpoon missile at the US vessels. Simpson immediately returned missile fire, striking Joshan in her superstructure. Joshan was then sunk by combined gunfire. Simpson was awarded the Joint Meritorious Unit Award and the Combat Action Ribbon for this operation, and the Armed Forces Expeditionary Medal for the deployment.

=== 1990s ===
20 February 1990, Simpson rescued 22 crew members from Surf City, a reflagged Kuwaiti tanker carrying $9 million in naphtha and gas oil. Surf City was transiting near the Iranian island of Abu Musa when it exploded, killing two and forcing the crew to abandon ship. According to Central Command, Simpson was not escorting the tanker, but was monitoring its progress from 3 nautical miles (5.6 km) away and responded immediately to rescue the crew. The fire was so intense that US ships could not approach it and Surf City burned for two weeks. At the time, the fire was feared to be the result of an attack or a mine, but the NTSB later determined it to be an accident.

In March 1992, during Simpson's third deployment, Simpson and Normandy escorted America and two supply ships into the Persian Gulf. At the time, Iraq was refusing to comply with UN weapons inspection and the ships departed the Persian Gulf in early April after inspections resumed.

In August 1993 on Simpson's fourth deployment she was again assigned to escort Carrier Group Six with America. During the deployment Simpson participated in Operation Deny Flight and Operation Provide Promise in the Adriatic Sea and supported Operation Continue Hope off Somalia. Simpson returned to homeport in February 1994.

In May 1994, Simpson was one of the ships enforcing United Nations sanctions on Haiti.

=== 1995 ===
Simpson deployed to the Caribbean Sea for counter drug operations in late 1994 and again in February 1995.

In November 1995, Simpson deployed to the Mediterranean joining the United States Sixth Fleet NATO's Standing Naval Force Atlantic. Simpson operated in the Adriatic Sea enforcing UN arms embargo against Croatia and Bosnia-Herzegovina and participating in Operation Sharp Guard. Simpson returned to Norfolk 8 May 1996.

=== 2000s ===
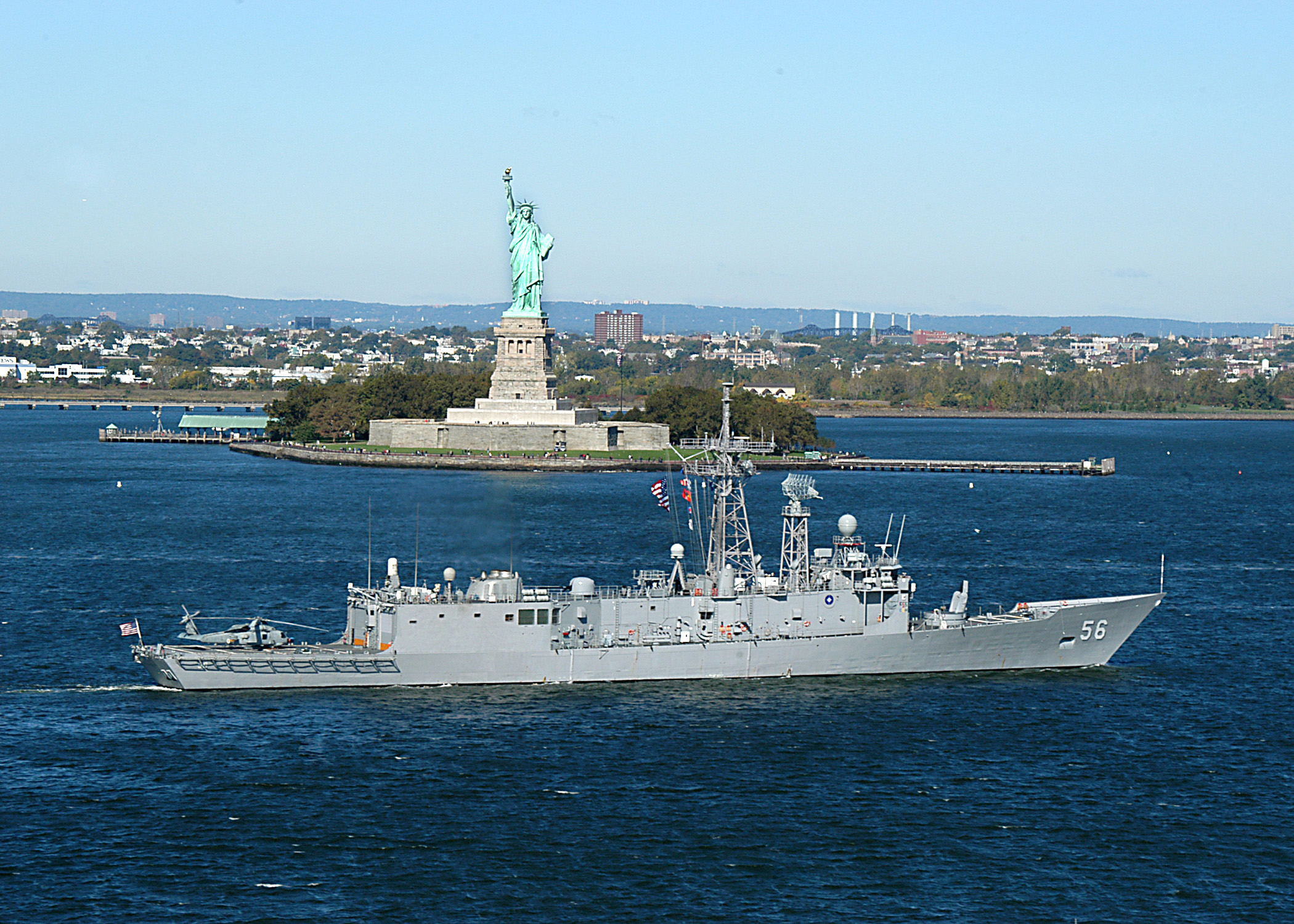
Simpson arriving in New York Harbor, October 2004 prior to removal of Mk 13 launcher, but after removal of the STIR missile guidance radar.

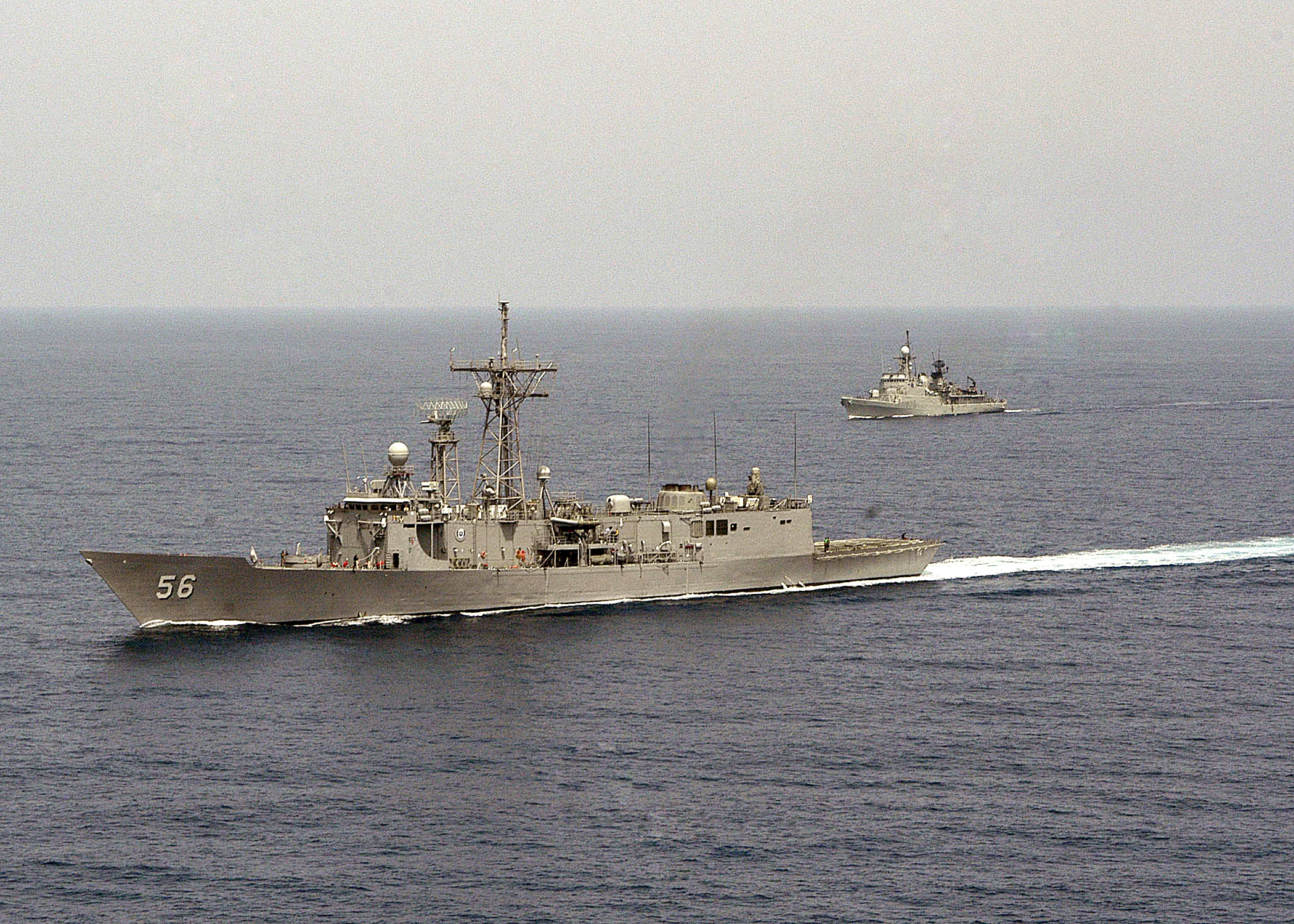
Simpson and Algerian frigate El Kirch, June 2006, after removal of missile launcher.

Capt. Gerald F. DeConto, Simpson's commanding officer from September 1998 to April 2000, was killed at the Pentagon during the September 11, 2001 attacks.

In July 2002, Simpson responded to Malpelo Island to medevac a wounded Colombian Marine who had received three gunshot wounds.

Simpson deployed with Helicopter Antisubmarine Squadron (Light) (HSL) 44, Det. 10 as part of NATO's Standing Naval Forces Atlantic on 22 September 2004 returning 20 December 2004. Simpson visited New York City 12 October 2004 during this deployment. Simpson's Mk 13 missile launcher was removed sometime in 2005 prior to her next deployment.

On 3 January 2006, Simpson deployed with HSL-42, Det. 9, joining Standing NRF Maritime Group 1 and participated in a number of international naval exercises in the North Sea, Norwegian Sea and Eastern Mediterranean Sea returning to Mayport 24 June 2006.

On 5 October 2007, Simpson deployed with HSL-46, Det. 7 and U.S. Coast Guard Law Enforcement Detachment (LEDET) 405, to the eastern Pacific for counter narcotics operations returning April 2008. During the deployment Simpson captured 16 metric tons of cocaine. On 29 November 2007, Simpson interdicted a self-propelled semi-submersible (SPSS) capable of carrying 5–8 metric tons of cocaine. The sub was sunk by its crew, but the crew was captured and turned over to Colombia.

=== 2010s ===
On 17 January 2012, Simpson deployed to the Sixth Fleet Area of Responsibility, participating in Africa Partnership Station 2012, and Operation Active Endeavor. Ports of call included Funchal, Rota, Casablanca, Dakar, Lagos, Accra, Mindelo, Souda Bay, Sicily, Naples and Praia. She returned to Naval Station Mayport on 17 July 2012.

On 18 September 2013, Simpson deployed once more to the United States Sixth Fleet Area of Responsibility. Ports of call included Ponta Delgada, Sicily, Bari, Athens, Valletta, Souda Bay and Casablanca. She returned to Naval Station Mayport on 20 March 2014. Simpson's final homeport was Naval Station Mayport, Florida, with assignment to Destroyer Squadron 14. Simpson was part of the Active Naval Reserve Force, Category A from 2002 until her decommissioning in September 2015. She was the final Oliver Hazard Perry-class frigate in service in the United States Navy. The ship is set to be put up for foreign military sale.

When Simpson was decommissioned, it meant the last United States ship still in active service to have sunk an enemy vessel was the 217-year-old USS Constitution.

=== Fate ===
On September 25, 2025, nearly 10 years after her decommissioning, Simpson was towed from Philiadelphia. On September 28, she was sunk in a SINKEX operation during UNITAS.
