= VP-45 =

Patrol Squadron 45
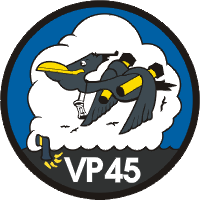
- Patrol Squadron 45 insignia
- Active: 1 November 1942 - present
- Country: United States of America
- Branch: United States Navy
- Type: Squadron
- Role: Maritime patrol
- Garrison/HQ: NAS Jacksonville
- Nickname: Pelicans The Red Darters Pelicans From Hell
- Engagements: World War II; Vietnam War; Gulf War

Insignia
- Tail code: LN

Aircraft flown
- Patrol: PBM-3C/3S/5; P5M-1/2/SP-5B; P-3A/C; P-8A

Patrol Squadron 45 (VP-45) is a maritime patrol squadron of the United States Navy. The squadron was established on 1 November 1942 and is based at Naval Air Station Jacksonville, Florida, United States. Since 2014, VP-45 is equipped with the Boeing P-8 Poseidon aircraft.

== History ==
VP-45 was established as Patrol Squadron 205 (VP-205) on 1 November 1942, redesignated Patrol Bombing Squadron 205 (VPB-205) on 1 October 1944, redesignated Patrol Squadron 205 (VP-205) on 15 May 1946, redesignated Medium Patrol Squadron (Seaplane) 5 (VP-MS-5) on 15 November 1946, and redesignated Patrol Squadron 45 (VP-45) on 1 September 1948. It is the third squadron to be designated VP-45. The first VP-45 was redesignated VP-14 on 1 December 1939 and the second VP-45 was redesignated VPB-45 on 1 October 1944.

=== Operational history ===
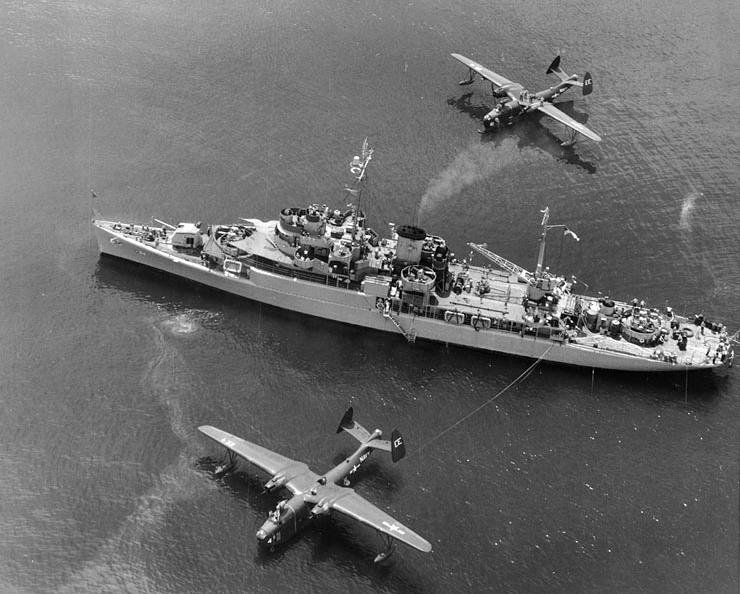
USS Timbalier (AVP-54) with two VP-45 PBM-3D in 1948.

- 1 November 1942: VP-205 was established at NAS Norfolk, Virginia, as a seaplane squadron flying the PBM-3 Mariner. During the first phase of training at NAS Norfolk, the squadron came under the operational control of FAW-5.
- 26 January – June 1943: Upon completion of the first phase of training, VP-205 was relocated to NS San Juan, Puerto Rico, with tender support provided by USS Albemarle. On 1 February 1943, the squadron came under the operational control of FAW-11. Training in advanced base operations continued along with regular operational patrol duties until June 1943. The squadron complement of aircraft was brought up to 13.
- 2–10 June 1943: VP-205 was relocated to NAS Trinidad, British West Indies. Duties consisted of antishipping and Anti-submarine warfare (ASW) patrols. New PBM-3S aircraft with improved radar replaced the older PBM-3C versions. On 10 June 1943, one of the new PBM-3S' was lost at sea during a patrol, possibly due to enemy action.
- 3 August 1943: A PBM piloted by Lieutenant (jg) C. C. Cox attacked a U-boat located on the surface and was shot down during the bomb run with the loss of all hands. Lieutenant Cox's attack resulted in the sinking of the submarine, later identified as U-572.
- 6 August 1943: A Mariner piloted by Lieutenant Anthony Matuski attacked a U-boat on the surface and was shot down with the loss of all hands. The heavily damaged submarine, U-615, was later sunk by other aircraft.
- 7 July 1944: VP-205 was relocated to NAS Guantanamo Bay, Cuba. Duties consisted of long-range ASW patrols and convoy coverage.
- 19 September 1944: VP-205 was relieved for return to NAS Norfolk. Personnel were given rehabilitation leave upon arrival and the PBM-3S aircraft were turned in for replacement with the PBM-5 version.
- 17 October 1944: Squadron personnel began returning from leave and check out in the new PBM-5 aircraft began. Reforming of the squadron and its assets was completed by the end of the month, and VPB-205 received orders to relocate to NAAS Harvey Point, North Carolina, for training.
- 29 November 1944 – 30 January 1945: Upon completion of training the squadron's area of operation was changed from the Atlantic to the Pacific. The cross-country flights from NAS Harvey Point to NAS San Diego, California, and then on to NAS Alameda, California, commenced with all aircraft arriving safely by 1 December. Upon arrival, aircrews began preparing their aircraft for the imminent trans-Pacific flight to NAS Kaneohe Bay, Hawaii. During this period the squadron came under the operational control of FAW-8. The first elements of the squadron began their transPac to NAS Kaneohe Bay on 21 December, with all aircraft arriving safely two days later. Operational training began immediately after the crews had settled into quarters. While at NAS Kaneohe Bay the squadron came under the operational control of FAW-2. From 23 to 30 January 1945, the squadron made several ferry flights between NAS Kaneohe Bay and NAS Alameda.
- 25 March 1945: VPB-205 relocated to the Mariana Islands operating under FAW-1. On 1 April 1945, the squadron moved temporarily ashore at NAB Tanapag, Saipan. From this location the squadron flew anti-shipping patrols, occasional Dumbo (air-sea rescue) missions and sector searches.
- 18 May 1945: VPB-205 was placed under the operational control of FAW-18 (TU 94.1.2). The squadron mission was changed from daytime to night anti-shipping patrols.
- 25 August 1945: VPB-205 was relocated from Saipan to Chimu Wan, Okinawa, under the operational control of FAW-1. Tender support was provided by USS St. George. Duties consisted of anti-shipping patrols and long-range searches.
- 23 September 1945: VPB-205 was relocated to Wakayama, Japan, to provide surveillance support during the military disarmament of Japan and courier/passenger services for the occupation forces. During this period the squadron came under the operational control of FAW-17.
- 21 November 1945: VPB-205 was relieved for return to NAS Norfolk, for a period of training and overhaul.
- April 1946: VPB-205 was assigned a new homeport at NAS Bermuda, British West Indies.
- 1950: VP-45 received a permanent change of station to NAS Norfolk to participate in experiments with specially modified PBM-5 aircraft to transport Marine assault forces to the beach.

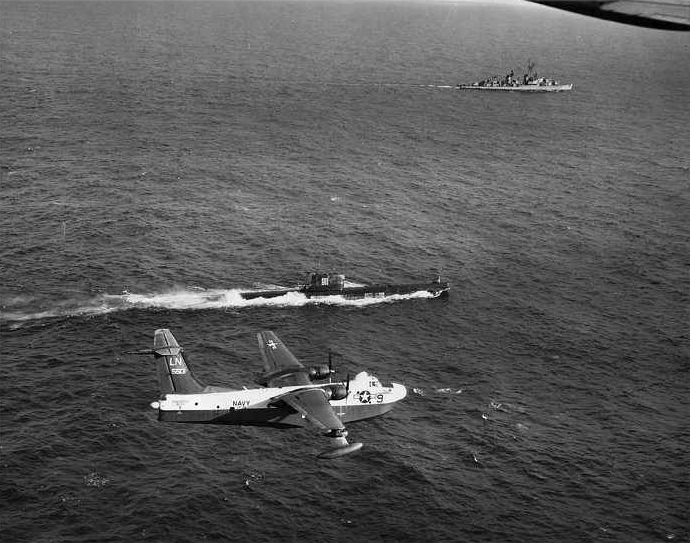
VP-45 P5M-2 flies over Soviet Foxtrot submarine 911 and USS Charles P. Cecil during the Cuban Missile Crisis, 1962

- 1 September 1956: VP-45 received a permanent change of station from NAS Coco Solo, Panama Canal Zone to NAS Bermuda.
- 1961–1963: VP-45 participated in all of the Project Mercury space shots as a member of the Bermuda Recovery Unit.
- 25 January – May 1963: VP-45 deployed to NAS Guantanamo Bay. The squadron was employed in shipping surveillance and ASW patrols, returning to NAS Bermuda in February. The squadron deployed again to NAS Guantanamo Bay on 27 March, returning to NAS Bermuda in May.
- 1 July 1963: VP-45 conducted its last deployment as a seaplane squadron at NAS Guantanamo Bay. During the two-month deployment the squadron conducted numerous 12-hour search and rescue (SAR) missions for distressed or wrecked vessels in the Caribbean.
- September 1963: VP-45 established detachments at NAS Patuxent River, Maryland, and NAS Jacksonville, Florida, to begin transition from the SP-5B Marlin to the P-3A Orion. VP-45 was the last patrol squadron in the Atlantic Fleet to use seaplanes, closing out 53 years of continuous service by these aircraft.
- 1 January 1964: Upon completion of transition training, the squadron was given a new homeport at NAS Jacksonville, Florida, under the operational control of FAW-11.
- 17 November 1964: A squadron P-3A, BuNo. 151362, crashed in the Atlantic with the loss of all hands.
- 27 May 1968: VP-45 were among the patrol squadrons and other naval units called upon to assist in the search for the ill-fated USS Scorpion, last heard from on 21 May 1968, 50 miles (80 km) south of the Azores. The search proved futile, and the four VP-45 patrol aircraft were released for return to NAS Jacksonville on 5 June 1968.
- 14 December 1968 – 5 February 1969: VP-45 deployed to NS Sangley Point, Philippines, with a detachment at U-Tapao Royal Thai Navy Airfield, Thailand. The squadron's primary mission was coastal surveillance patrols in conjunction with Operation Market Time. On 5 February 1969, the squadron was called upon to assist in locating a capsized civilian vessel.
- 2 June 1969: Crew 20, returning from MCAS Iwakuni, Japan, in P-3A, BuNo. 151363, attempted a takeoff at NAS Adak, Alaska, to continue their return to NAS Jacksonville, from deployment. Apparent engine failure caused the crew to abort the takeoff, but the aircraft lacked sufficient runway to stop. The Pilot, Commander R. A. Mason, elected to take the aircraft off the runway into the tundra, rather than going over the end of the runway into the rocks and water. In doing so the landing gear collapsed and the starboard wing parted company with the aircraft. All 15 crewmembers exited the plane without injury shortly before it burst into flames.

8-1969 VP-45 took ownership of three P-2V-7 on UNITAS X. Their new designations were LN-40 147951, LN-41 147062 which were in South America and spare at NAS Jax VP-45 LN-42 147959 which flew first flew 9-4

- 19 October 1970: VP-45 deployed to NAS Sigonella, Sicily. The squadron provided support for the Sixth Fleet during the Jordanian crisis of September 1970. The squadron received a Meritorious Unit Commendation for it activities during this period.
- April – October 1972: VP-45 began transition to the P-3C version of the Orion. The squadron was fully operational with the new aircraft by October 1972.
- 12 August – 22 November 1975: VP-45 deployed to NAF Sigonella, Sicily. On 22 November, the squadron provided medical and logistical support following the collision of USS Belknap and USS John F. Kennedy. NAF Sigonella served as the initial medical evacuation site.
- 1980: Reduced manning levels resulted in the reassignment of personnel to meet the drop in the squadron aircraft complement from 12 to 9 crews.
- May 1980: The temporary lifting of the ban on immigration from Cuba resulted in a tremendous influx of refugees into the straits separating Cuba from Florida. VP-45 was tasked with monitoring the flow of boats and their safe arrival at Florida while attempting to prevent the southward transit of additional vessels.
- 13 April – August 1983: VP-45 deployed to NAF Sigonella, Sicily, relieving VP-49. Prior to deployment the squadron had completed an eight-week modification program making VP-45 combat ready to employ the Harpoon anti-ship missile. The squadron spent much of August on standby during the escalating crisis in Lebanon. An alert aircraft armed with MK46 torpedoes and Harpoon missiles was kept on ready status to support the U.S. battle group off the coast of Beirut. For this support the squadron earned a Navy Expeditionary Medal.
- 2 July 1987: During the squadron's deployment to NAS Sigonella, Sicily, its aircraft supported Sixth Fleet operations near Libya, flying missions armed with Harpoon missiles.
- March – December 1988: The first of VP-45's P-3C MOD (modification) aircraft returned from a refit to the P-3C UIII configuration. The remaining squadron aircraft completed retrofitting by December 1988. VP-45 was the first East Coast squadron to be equipped with the update III retrofit version, deploying to NAS Bermuda in February 1989.
- November 1989: VP-45 sent a detachment for the first time to NAS Key West, Florida, in support of Joint Task Force 4's drug interdiction program.

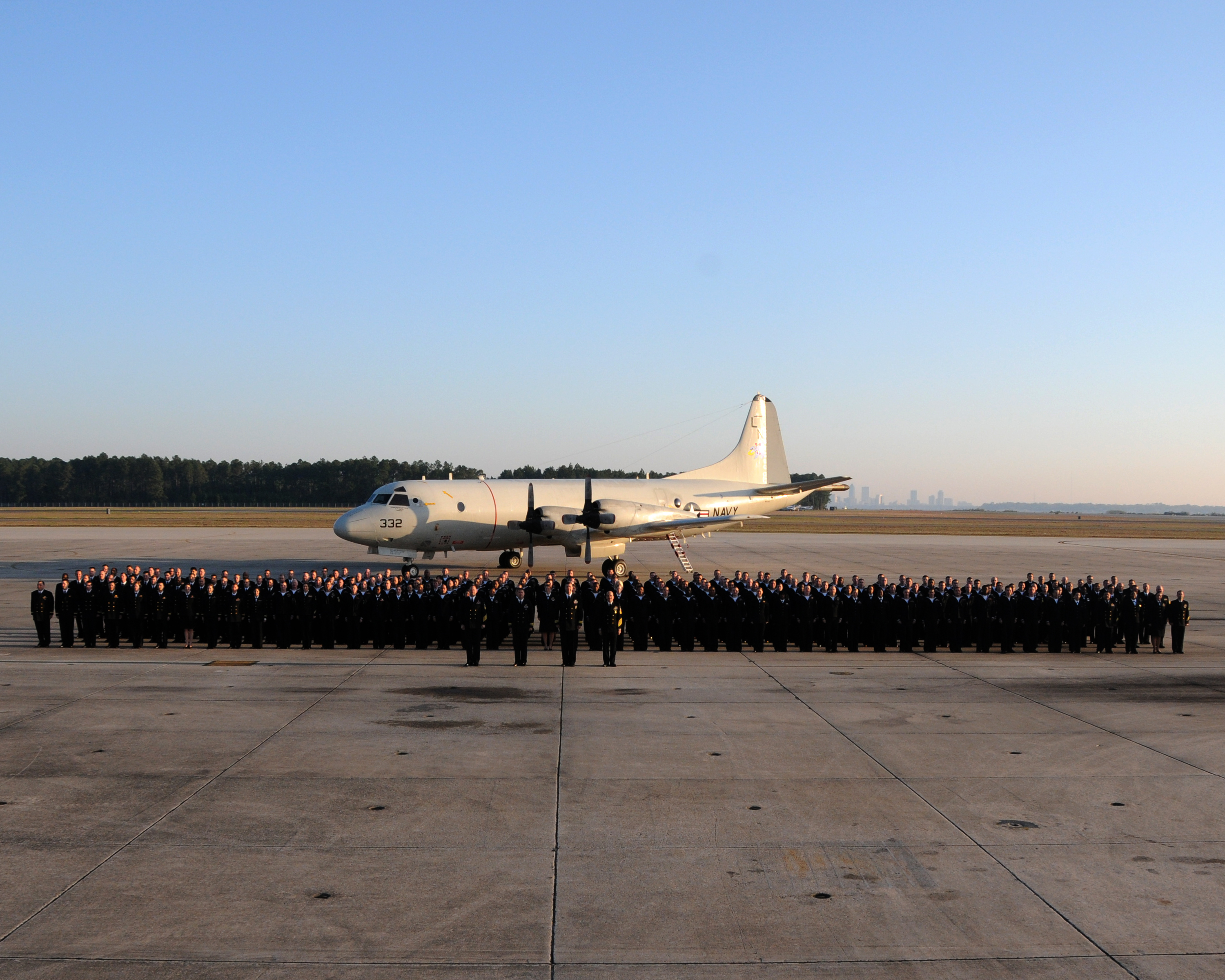
VP-45 personnel and P-3C at NAS Jacksonville in 2010

- 22 June 1990 – 10 January 1991: The VP-45 flew to their deployment site at Naval Station Rota, Spain. During the deployment the squadron was called upon to support Operation Sharp Edge, the evacuation of U.S. citizens from Liberia during the period of civil unrest. In August, VP-45 became part of the UN blockade of Iraq after its occupation of Kuwait All of the squadron's commitments (ASW coverage of the Mediterranean, Operation Sharp Edge and Operation Desert Storm) were met without injury or aircraft mishap during the entire deployment.
- April – June 1991: VP-45 provided a detachment in support of Joint Task 4, based at NAS Roosevelt Roads, Puerto Rico. The detachment compiled a database on maritime traffic that greatly enhanced the ability of the task force to track illegal narcotics operations in the Caribbean.
- 25 February – September 1992: VP-45 deployed to NAS Keflavik, Iceland, with detachments at various times toten different sites. As Russian submarine traffic in the North Atlantic drastically diminished with the collapse of the Soviet Bloc, far fewer acoustic and photo intelligence opportunities were available to the squadron. Numerous exercises with NATO allies helped take up the slack during the deployment.
- September 1993 – March 1994: During the squadron's deployment to NAS Keflavik, Iceland, Russian submarine traffic continued to decrease, with far fewer captures than in previous years.
- 11 December 1994 – May 1995: VP-45 deployed to NS Roosevelt Roads. The full-squadron deployment supported Joint Task 4 in the interdiction of drug trafficking in the Caribbean area. When the squadron returned to NAS Jacksonville in May 1995, it marked its 25th consecutive year of Class A mishapfree flight operations.
- September 2001, after the U.S. terrorist attacks, VP-45 flew long-range reconnaissance missions along the U.S. Eastern Seaboard as part of Operation Enduring Freedom.
- In June 2013 VP-45 completed their transition from the P-3C Orion to the P-8A Poseidon. Becoming the Navy's third operational P-8A squadron, following VP-16 and VP-5.
- VP-45 P-8 Poseidons make the type's Exercise Red Flag debut at Red Flag 16-1.
- 8 April 2017 aircraft from VP-45 returned from seven-month deployment with seven P-8 Poseidons. Operating out of Naval Air Station Sigonella in Italy. VP-45 are first squadron to deploy with the P-8 to Europe.

== Aircraft assignments ==
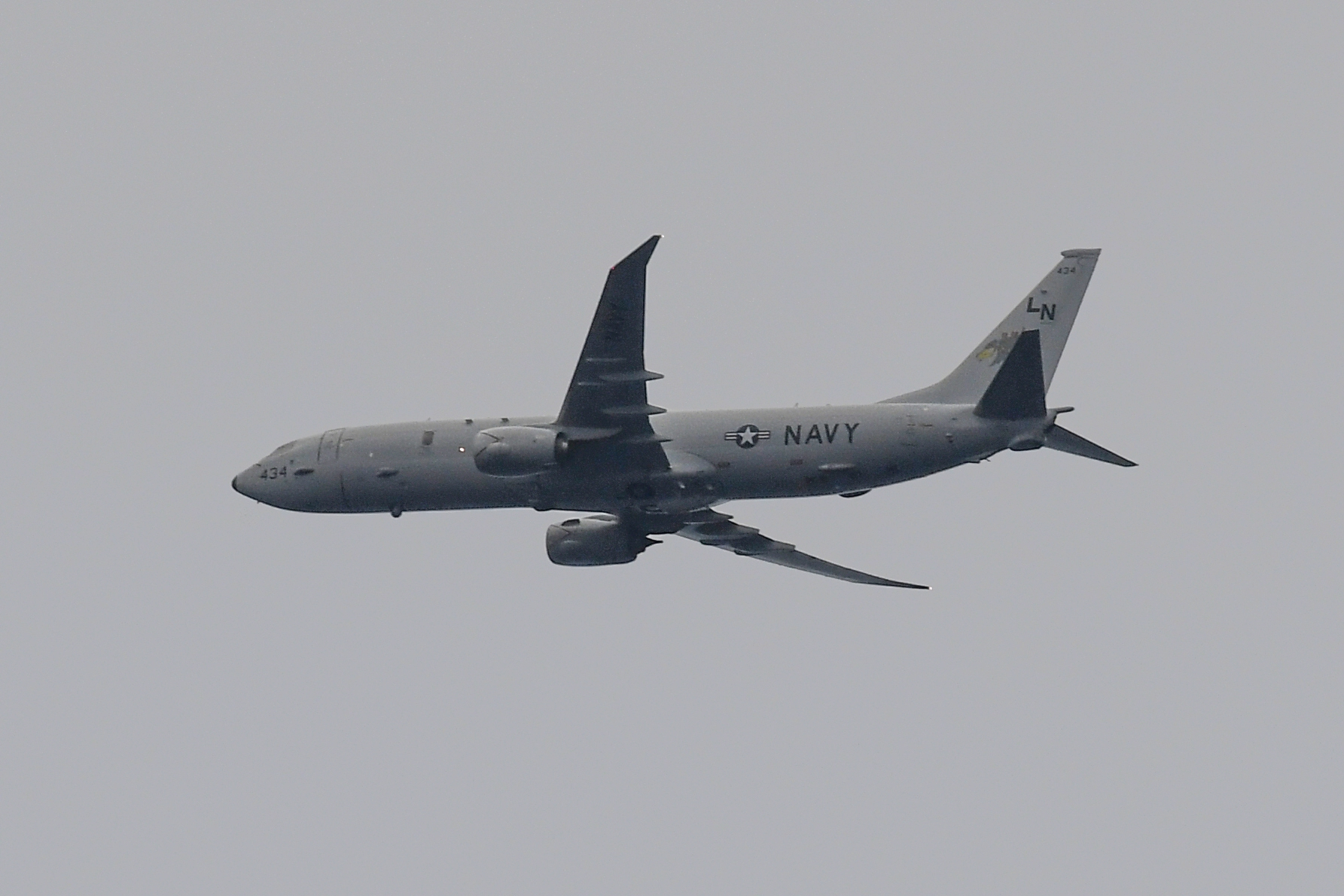
A VP-45 P-8A over the Mediterranean Sea in 2017.

The squadron was assigned the following aircraft, effective on the dates shown:

- PBM-3C - November 1942
- PBM-3S - June 1943
- PBM-5 - September 1944
- P5M-1 - April 1954
- P5M-2 - December 1956
- SP-5B - December 1962
- P-3A - September 1963
- P-3C - October 1972
- P-3C UIII - March 1988
- P-3C UIIIR - 1993
- P-8A - 2013

== Home port assignments ==
The squadron was assigned to these home ports, effective on the dates shown:

- NAS Norfolk, Virginia - 1 November 1942
- NS San Juan, Puerto Rico - 26 January 1943
- NAS Trinidad, British West Indies - 2 June 1943
- NAS Guantanamo Bay, Cuba - 7 July 1944
- NAS Norfolk -19 September 1944
- NAAS Harvey Point, North Carolina - 17 October 1944
- NAS Alameda, California - 1 December 1944
- NAS Kaneohe Bay, Hawaii - 23 December 1944
- NAS Norfolk - 21 November 1945
- NAS Bermuda, British West Indies - April 1946
- NAS Norfolk - 1950
- NAS Coco Solo, Panama Canal Zone - April 1951
- NAS Bermuda - 1 September 1956
- NAS Jacksonville, Florida - 1 January 1964

== See also ==
- Maritime patrol aircraft
- List of United States Navy aircraft squadrons
- List of inactive United States Navy aircraft squadrons
- List of squadrons in the Dictionary of American Naval Aviation Squadrons
- History of the United States Navy
