= Naval Air Station Jacksonville =

United States Navy air base in Jacksonville, Florida, US

- Towers Field
- Jacksonville, Florida in the United States
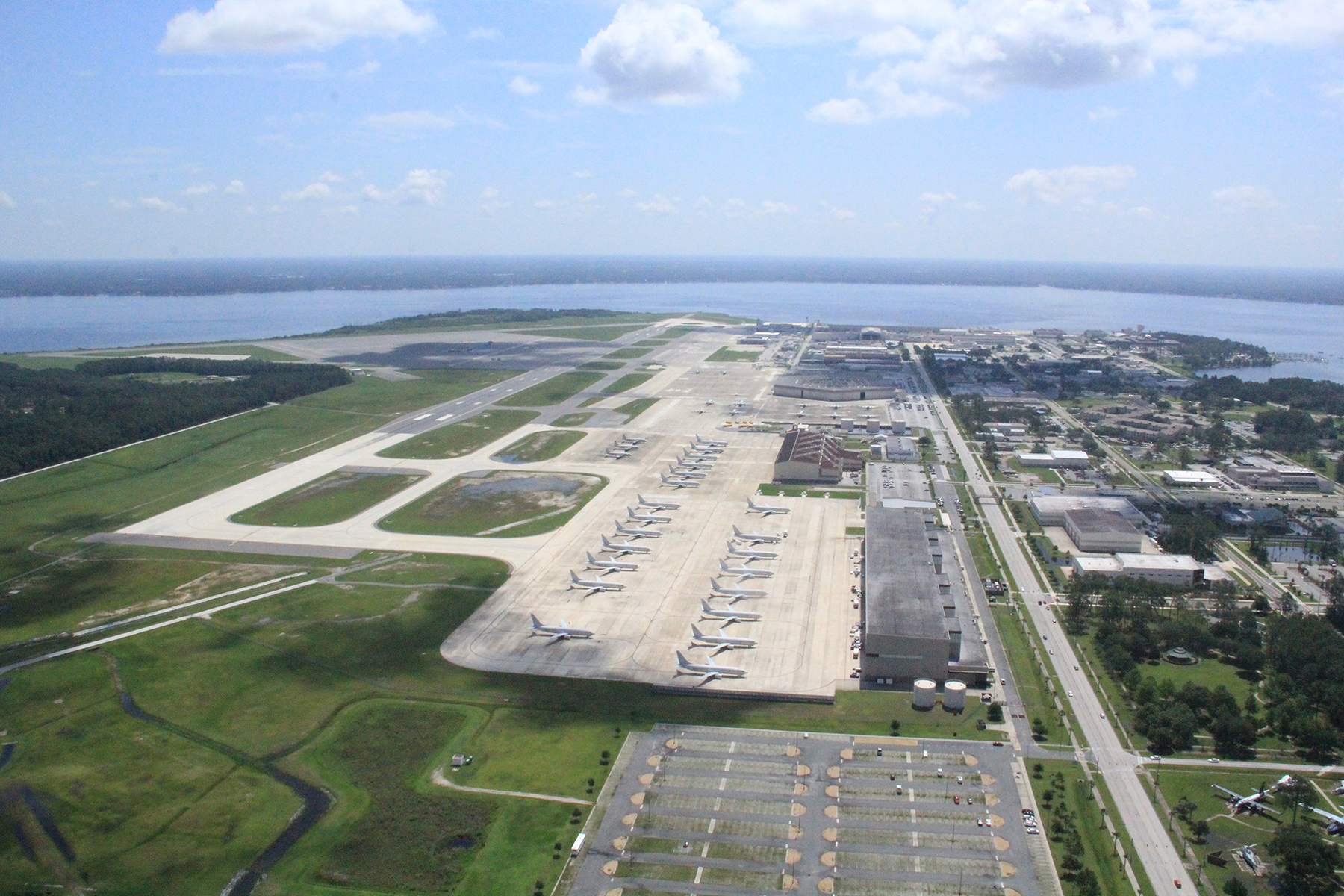
- An aerial view of NAS Jacksonville during 2018

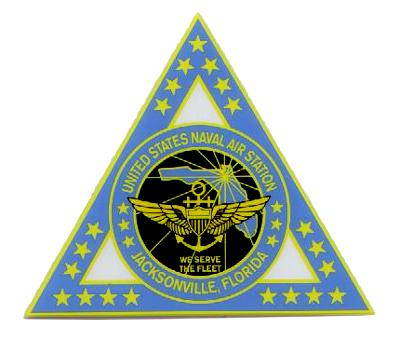

Site information
- Type: Naval Air Station
- Owner: Department of Defense
- Operator: US Navy
- Controlled by: Navy Region Southeast
- Condition: Operational
- Website: Official website

Location
- Location in the United States
- Coordinates: 30°14′09″N 081°40′50″W

Site history
- Built: 1940
- In use: 1940–present

Garrison information
- Current commander: Captain Marcos Cantu
- Garrison: Patrol and Reconnaissance Wing Eleven

Airfield information
- Identifiers: IATA: NIP, ICAO: KNIP, FAA LID: NIP, WMO: 722065
- Elevation: 7 metres (23 ft) AMSL
Runways
| Direction | Length and surface |
|---|---|
| 10/28 | 2,744.1 metres (9,003 ft) Asphalt |
| 14/32 | 1,822 metres (5,978 ft) Asphalt |

Naval Air Station Jacksonville (NAS Jacksonville) (IATA: NIP, ICAO: KNIP, FAA LID: NIP) is a large naval air station located approximately eight miles (13 km) south of the central business district of Jacksonville, Florida, United States.

== Location ==
NAS Jacksonville is located in Duval County, Florida, within the city limits of Jacksonville. The base sits on a piece of land between the St. Johns River and Ortega River historically called Black Point. The airbase is part of the overall Jacksonville Naval Complex, a collection of Navy Bases in the Jacksonville Metropolitan Area that include Naval Station Mayport; the former Naval Air Station Cecil Field (now Cecil Airport); Naval Outlying Landing Field Whitehouse; and the Pinecastle Range Complex. It also neighbors a small ghost town called Yukon.

== History ==
During World War I, the area now occupied by NAS Jacksonville, often referred to colloquially as "NAS Jax," was named Camp Joseph E. Johnston, and was commissioned on October 15, 1917. The United States Army trained quartermasters and the center included more than 600 buildings; by 1918 Camp Johnston was the largest of all Quartermaster mobilization and training camps. The second largest rifle range in the U.S. was constructed there, but the camp was decommissioned on May 16, 1919. The Florida National Guard began using the site in 1928 and it was renamed Camp J. Clifford R. Foster. In 1939 a group of 10 ex service men traveled to Washington at their own expense to talk the Navy, who was looking for a new base, to come and look at the old National Guard base, they did and liked what they saw. Most of their names are lost to history. Only two are known: Charles Bennett and Ira Lane.

=== Jacksonville Naval Complex commissioning ===
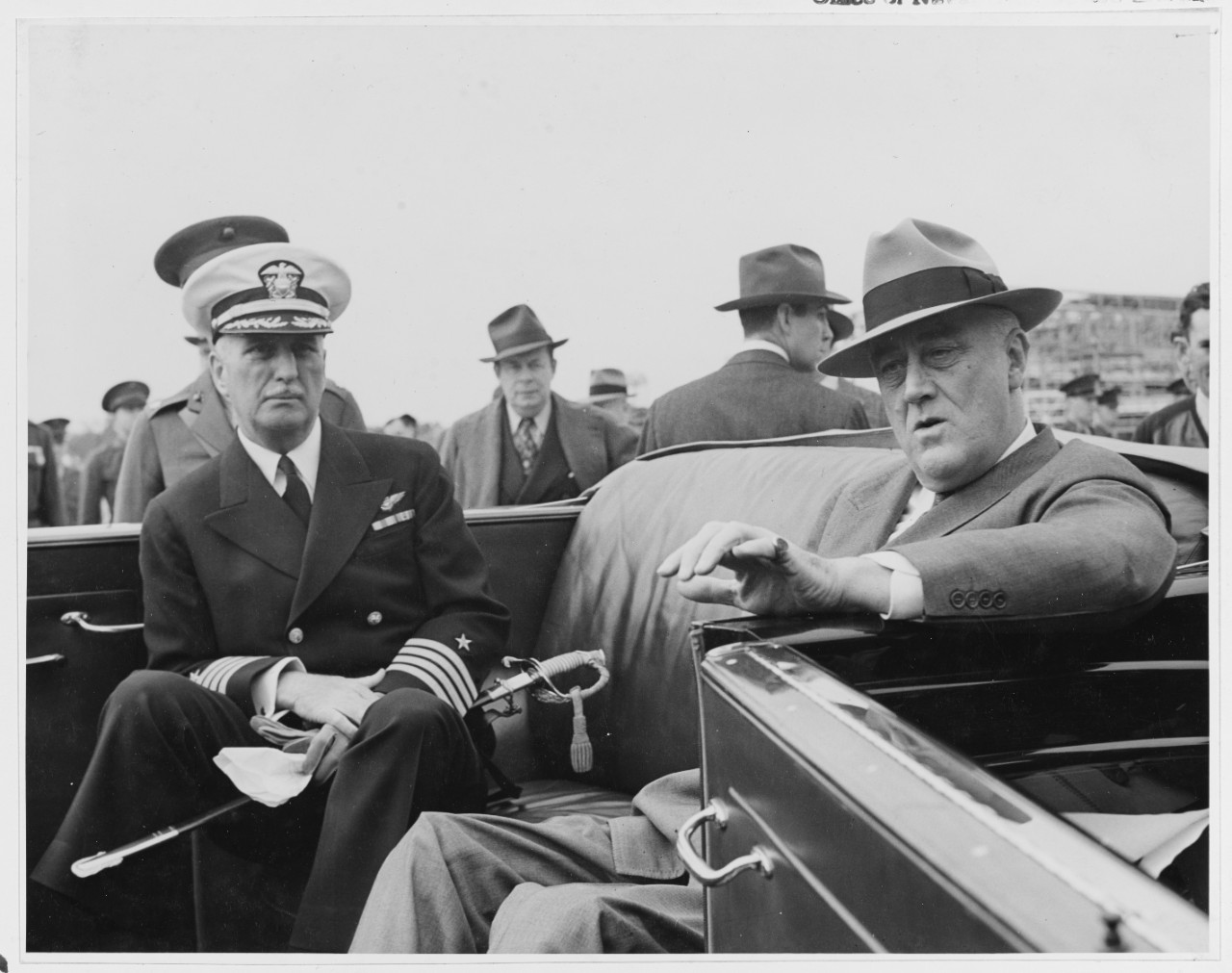
Captain Charles P. Mason (left) with President Franklin D. Roosevelt during the commissioning ceremony of the station on October 15, 1940.

On October 15, 1940, Naval Air Station Jacksonville was officially commissioned, and became the first part of the Jacksonville Navy complex. On the same date, Captain Charles P. Mason, USN, raised his command pennant as the station's first commanding officer. Prior to the commissioning, on September 7, Commander Jimmy Grant became the first pilot to land on the still unfinished runway in his N3N-3 biplane. More than 10,000 pilots and 11,000 airmen followed their lead to earn their "wings of gold" at the air station during World War II.

Increased training and construction characterized NAS Jacksonville's response to America's entry into World War II. Three runways over 6,000 feet (1,800 m) long were operating, as were seaplane runways in the St. Johns River and seaplane ramps leading from the water. Overhaul and Repair (O&R) facilities were built to rework the station's planes, a facility that in ensuing years would be renamed Naval Air Rework Facility Jacksonville (NARF Jax). More than 700 buildings sprung to life on the base before V-J Day (Victory over Japan), including an 80-acre (320,000 m^{2}) hospital and a POW camp which housed more than 1,500 German prisoners of war. Archbishop (later Cardinal) Francis J. Spellman dedicated the Catholic Chapel (St. Edward's) at its Birmingham Avenue location on January 17, 1943. The chapel and other buildings constructed during the war years, intended for a life of only 20 years, are still in use.

FAA Airport Diagram

During the late 1940s, the jet age was dawning and in 1948 the Navy's first jet carrier air groups and squadrons came to NAS Jacksonville. By April 1949, NAS Jacksonville was the East Coast's aircraft capital, with more naval aircraft stationed here than at any other naval base from Nova Scotia to the Caribbean – 60 percent of the Fleet's air striking force in the Atlantic area from pole to pole. Fleet Air Wing Eleven made its move to the base, bringing with it Patrol Squadron THREE (VP-3) from NAS Coco Solo, Panama and Patrol Squadron FIVE (VP-5) from NAS San Juan, Puerto Rico. The now famous U.S. Naval Flight Demonstration Squadron, the Blue Angels, who had called NAS Jacksonville home but later moved to NAS Corpus Christi in the late 1940s, performed a last air show at the station on April 29, 1950, before forming the nucleus of an operational fighter squadron, VF-191 (Satan's Kittens), which was assigned to combat in Korea. The "Blues" would not return to the station for more than two years. In the early 1950s, Naval Air Technical Training Center (NATTC) Jacksonville was also reactivated and included nine different schools.

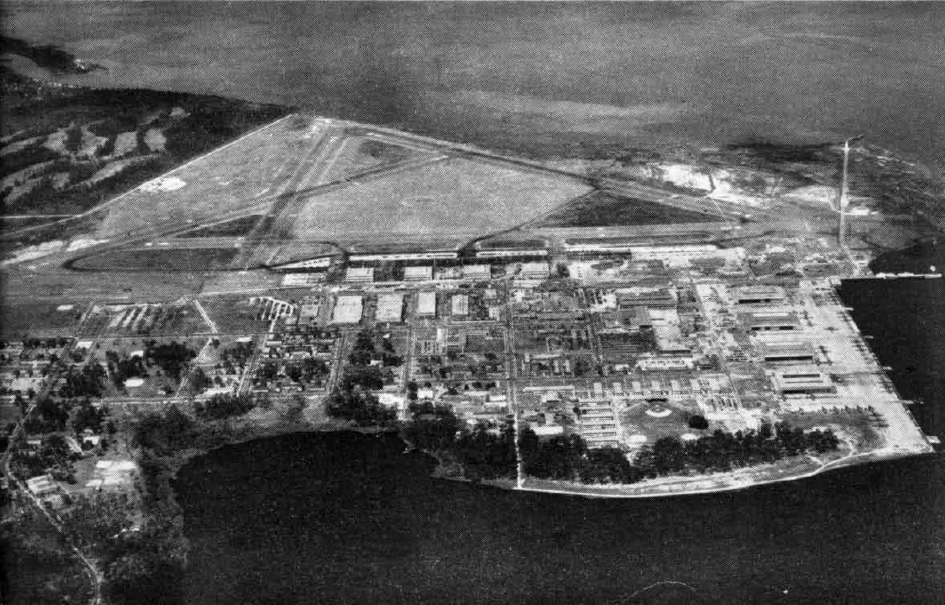
Aerial view of NAS Jacksonville in the mid-1940s

In the mid-1950s, an air traffic control center for joint use by the Navy, Air Force, and Civil Aeronautics Administration was approved and completed at a cost of $325,000. Major changes also occurred as parking ramps were added shore-based aircraft hangars and a 1,231-foot (375 m)-long taxiway was built. With the station's continuing growth, the Navy was having a tremendous impact on the economic growth in the Jacksonville and Duval County area. The station had over 11,000 military personnel assigned, along with 5,000 civilians and an annual payroll of more than $35 million.

In March 1959, Marine Attack Squadron ONE FOUR TWO (VMA-142) of the Marine Corps Reserve relocated to NAS Jacksonville from the closing MCAS Miami, along with the associated Marine Air Reserve Training Detachment (MARTD). VMA-142 would remain at NAS Jax until its relocation to nearby NAS Cecil Field in 1978.

On July 1, 1957, The United States Air Force Air Defense Command established a Phase III Mobile Radar station at NAS Jacksonville with the 679th Aircraft Warning and Control Squadron operating AN/FPS-3, AN/FPS-8, and AN/MPS-14 radars as part of the integrated ADC radar network. It was designated as ADC site M-114. In 1962 AN/FPS-66 radar and a pair of AN/FPS-6 heightfinder radars were added. During 1962 M-114 joined the Semi Automatic Ground Environment (SAGE) system, and the squadron was re-designated as the 679th Radar Squadron (SAGE) on 1 October 1962. On 31 July 1963, the site was redesignated as NORAD ID Z-114. In addition to the site at NAS Jacksonville, the 679th operated several "Gap Filler" remote sites to extend its radar coverage at Bunnell, FL and Blythe Island, GA. In 1963 M-114 became a joint-use facility with the Federal Aviation Administration (FAA). It performed routine general radar surveillance until 30 September 1981 when the site was inactivated.

=== Growth and consolidation ===
In 1970, a major reorganization of the Naval Reserve resulted in three separate Naval Air Reserve flying squadrons, identical to their active duty Regular Navy counterparts, being activated at NAS Jacksonville. These squadrons consisted of Attack Squadron TWO ZERO THREE (VA-203), Patrol Squadron SIXTY-TWO (VP-62) and Fleet Logistics Support Squadron FIFTY-EIGHT (VR-58). VA-203 would later relocate to NAS Cecil Field in 1977, with the remaining reserve squadrons joined by Helicopter Antisubmarine Squadron SEVENTY-FIVE (HS-75) in 1985 following its relocation from NAS Willow Grove, Pennsylvania.

In 1973, with the assignment of Helicopter Antisubmarine Wing One, the station's primary mission became antisubmarine warfare. Accompanying the wing were five helicopter squadrons which are still based here today. With the new wings and squadrons, opportunities grew for both sea duty and shore duty assignment to NAS Jacksonville. The station's popularity grew and it became one of the most requested duty station for sailors and officers in Naval Aviation throughout the Navy.

A piece of history and Navy and Marine Corps tradition was lost in 1986 when the last unit of Marines left NAS Jacksonville. Marine Barracks Jacksonville had been one of the first groups to arrive at the base in 1940, but left due to mission realignments and a reduction in Marines authorized for Marine Corps Security Force duties at U.S. Naval installations. Force reductions continued in the 1990s and early 2000s with the elimination of P-3 squadrons (VP-24, VP-49, VP-56) and H-60 squadrons (HS-1, HS-9, HS-75).

With the BRAC-directed closure of NAS Brunswick, Maine by mid-2011, Patrol Squadron EIGHT (VP-8), Patrol Squadron TEN (VP-10), Patrol Squadron TWENTY-SIX (VP-26), Special Projects Patrol Squadron ONE (VPU-1) and Fleet Logistics Support Squadron SIXTY-TWO (VR-62) began relocating to NAS Jacksonville in 2007 with their P-3 and C-130T aircraft, with all of these squadrons in place at NAS Jacksonville by late 2010.

== Current operations ==
The installation is one of the central hubs for naval activity in the U.S. South, with over 50,000 civilian employees, contractors and active-duty personnel employed.

NAS Jacksonville is home to Patrol Squadron THIRTY (VP-30), the Navy's largest aviation squadron and the only P-3 Orion and P-8 Poseidon Fleet Replacement Squadron that prepares pilots, air crew and maintenance personnel for operational assignments in the P-8A, P-3C, and EP-3E Aries in the U.S. Navy, and P-3B, P-3C and similar variants in various NATO and Allied navies and air forces.

In addition, NAS Jacksonville is home to Naval Hospital Jacksonville, under Navy Medicine, which supports all medical programming across naval installations in Florida, including providing the command structure for five Base Health Clinics (BHCs) from Jacksonville to Key West.

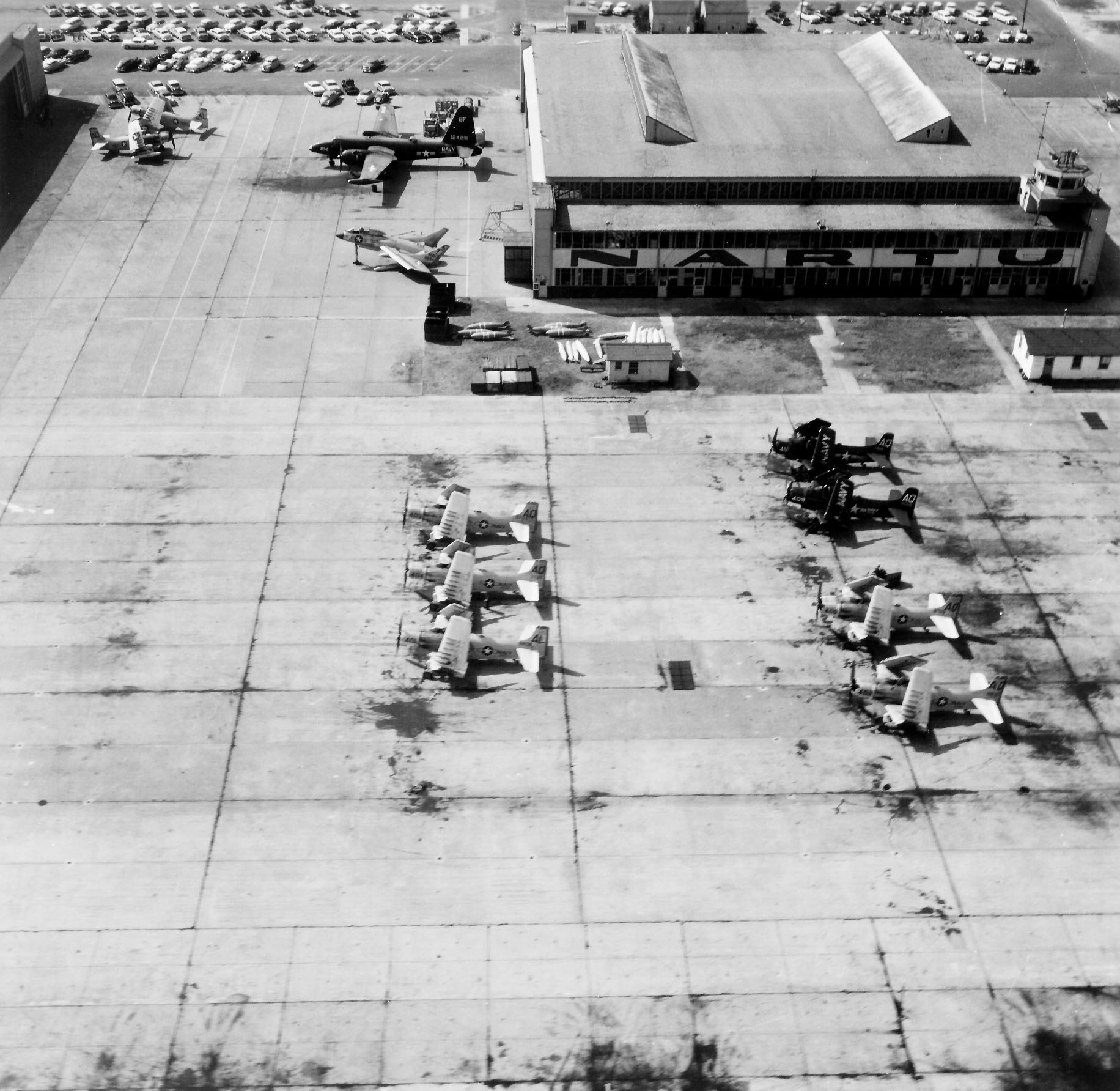
Naval Air Reserve Training Unit hangar 113 in 1958

Finally, support facilities at NAS Jacksonville include its being an Aviation Maintenance training facility for several aviation ratings (facilitated by the Center for Naval Aviation Technical Training Unit Jacksonville), an additional outlying field (OLF Whitehouse) for pilot training, a maintenance depot employing more than 150 different trade skills capable of performing maintenance as basic as changing a tire to intricate micro-electronics or total engine disassembly, a Fleet Industrial Supply Center, a Navy Family Service Center, a DeCA commissary, Navy Exchange, and recreational facilities for both single sailors and families of the Active, Reserve and Retired military communities.

NAS Jacksonville houses a facility to train pilots for the Northrop Grumman MQ-4C Triton. In addition to that NAS Jacksonville has trained foreign aircrews including that of Royal Australian Navy's New Squadron 725.

=== Fleet Readiness Center Southeast ===
Fleet Readiness Center Southeast is the Naval Air Systems Command (NAVAIR) maintenance, repair and operations depot for NAS Jacksonville.

The depot was originally founded as Naval Air Rework Facility (NARF) Jacksonville. With the growth of NAS Jacksonville into a major military aviation hub, the facility underwent a major change to keep up with the growth, thus being renamed to Naval Aviation Depot (NADEP) Jacksonville. Around the 1990s, NAVAIR underwent a major reorganization, converting all of its naval air depots into Fleet Readiness Centers, now directed under the Commander, Fleet Readiness Centers (COMFRC); thus, NADEP Jacksonville was renamed Fleet Readiness Center Southeast, and became the depot for all of the Southeastern United States.

Staffed at over 5,000 DoN Civilian Employees, Contractors, and Military personnel, Fleet Readiness Center Southeast is the largest employer in Northeast Florida/Southern Georgia region.

== Tenant commands ==
=== Aviation units ===
| Insignia | Squadron | Code | Callsign/Nickname | Assigned Aircraft | Operational Assignment |
|---|---|---|---|---|---|
| | Patrol Squadron 30 | VP-30 | Pro's Nest | P-8A Poseidon | Fleet Replacement Squadron (FRS) |
| | Patrol Squadron 5 | VP-5 | Mad Foxes | P-8A Poseidon | Commander, Patrol and Reconnaissance Wing 11 |
| | Patrol Squadron 8 | VP-8 | The Fighting Tigers | P-8A Poseidon | Commander, Patrol and Reconnaissance Wing 11 |
| | Patrol Squadron 10 | VP-10 | Red Lancers | P-8A Poseidon | Commander, Patrol and Reconnaissance Wing 11 |
| | Patrol Squadron 16 | VP-16 | War Eagles | P-8A Poseidon | Commander, Patrol and Reconnaissance Wing 11 |
| | Patrol Squadron 26 | VP-26 | Bone Deep | P-8A Poseidon | Commander, Patrol and Reconnaissance Wing 11 |
| | Patrol Squadron 45 | VP-45 | Pelicans | P-8A Poseidon | Commander, Patrol and Reconnaissance Wing 11 |
| | Patrol Squadron 62 | VP-62 | Broadarrows | P-8A Poseidon | Commander, Patrol and Reconnaissance Wing 11 |
| | Unmanned Patrol Squadron 19 | VUP-19 | Big Red | MQ-4C Triton | Commander, Patrol and Reconnaissance Wing 11 |
| | Helicopter Maritime Strike Squadron 46 | HSM-46 | Grandmasters | MH-60R Seahawk | Commander, Helicopter Maritime Strike Wing, U.S. Atlantic Fleet, Detachment Jacksonville |
| | Helicopter Maritime Strike Squadron 70 | HSM-70 | Spartans | MH-60R Seahawk | Commander, Helicopter Maritime Strike Wing, U.S. Atlantic Fleet, Detachment Jacksonville |
| | Helicopter Maritime Strike Squadron 72 | HSM-72 | Proud Warriors | MH-60R Seahawk | Commander, Helicopter Maritime Strike Wing, U.S. Atlantic Fleet, Detachment Jacksonville |
| | Helicopter Maritime Strike Squadron 74 | HSM-74 | Swamp Foxes | MH-60R Seahawk | Commander, Helicopter Maritime Strike Wing, U.S. Atlantic Fleet, Detachment Jacksonville |

Patrol Squadron 30 (VP-30)

- Commander, Patrol and Reconnaissance Wing 11
  - VP-5 "Mad Foxes"
  - VP-8 "Fighting Tigers"
  - VP-10 "Red Lancers"
  - VP-16 "War Eagles"
  - VP-26 "Tridents"
  - VP-45 "Pelicans"
  - VUP-19 "Big Red"
- Commander, Helicopter Maritime Strike Wing, U.S. Atlantic Fleet, Detachment Jacksonville
  - HSM-46 "Grandmasters"
  - HSM-70 "Spartans"
  - HSM-72 "Proud Warriors"
  - HSM-74 "Swamp Foxes"
- Reserve Squadrons
  - Commander, Fleet Logistics Support Wing
    - VR-58 "Sunseekers" - Boeing C-40A
    - VR-62 "Nomads" - Lockheed C-130T
  - Commander, Maritime Support Wing
    - VP-62 - "Broadarrows" Boeing P-8
    - HSM-60 "Jaguars" - Sikorsky MH-60R

NOTE: VP-62 is OPCON to COMPATRECONWING 11 and HSM-60 is OPCON to COMHSMWINGLANT. Both squadrons are ADCON to Commander, Maritime Support Wing (COMMARSUPWING) at NAS North Island, California. VR-58 and VR-62 are both OPCON and ADCON to Commander, Fleet Logistics Support Wing (COMFLELOGSUPWING) at NAS JRB Fort Worth / Carswell Field, Texas.

A P-3 Orion from VP-5.

=== Navy Reserve wings ===
Commander, Naval Reserve Readiness Command Region Eight

Commander, Fleet Logistics Support Wing

Commander, Maritime Support Wing

=== Shore-based units and components ===
Commander, Naval Region Southeast

Coastal Riverine Squadron 10

Center for Naval Aviation Technical Training Unit (CNATTU)

Naval Aviation Forecast Component Jacksonville

=== Material commands ===
Naval Air Systems Command (NAVAIR)

Naval Facilities and Engineering Command (NAVFAC)

Naval Supply Systems Command (NAVSUP)

=== Other units ===
Navy Bureau of Medicine and Surgery (BUMED)

- Naval Hospital Jacksonville
  - Naval Branch Clinic Jacksonville
  - Naval Branch Dental Clinic Jacksonville

Naval Air Reserve / Navy Operational Support Center Jacksonville (Navy Reserve)

Navy Entomology Center of Excellence

Naval Mobile Construction Battalion 14

Navy Oceanographic Anti-Submarine Warfare Detachment (NOAD), Jacksonville

Surface Rescue Swimmer School (SRSS)

Aircraft Carrier Tactical Support Center (CV-TSC)

Navy Exchange (NEXCOM) Southeast District

Transient Personnel Unit

=== Other federal agencies ===
Defense Logistics Agency (DoD)

- DRMO Jacksonville

U.S. Customs and Border Protection (DHS)

- Jacksonville Air and Marine Branch

== Education ==
Duval County Public Schools is the school district for the whole county.

The zoned schools (for dependents on-post) are Venetia Elementary School, Westside Middle School (previously J.E.B. Stuart Middle School), and Riverside High School (previously Robert E. Lee High School).

== Gallery ==
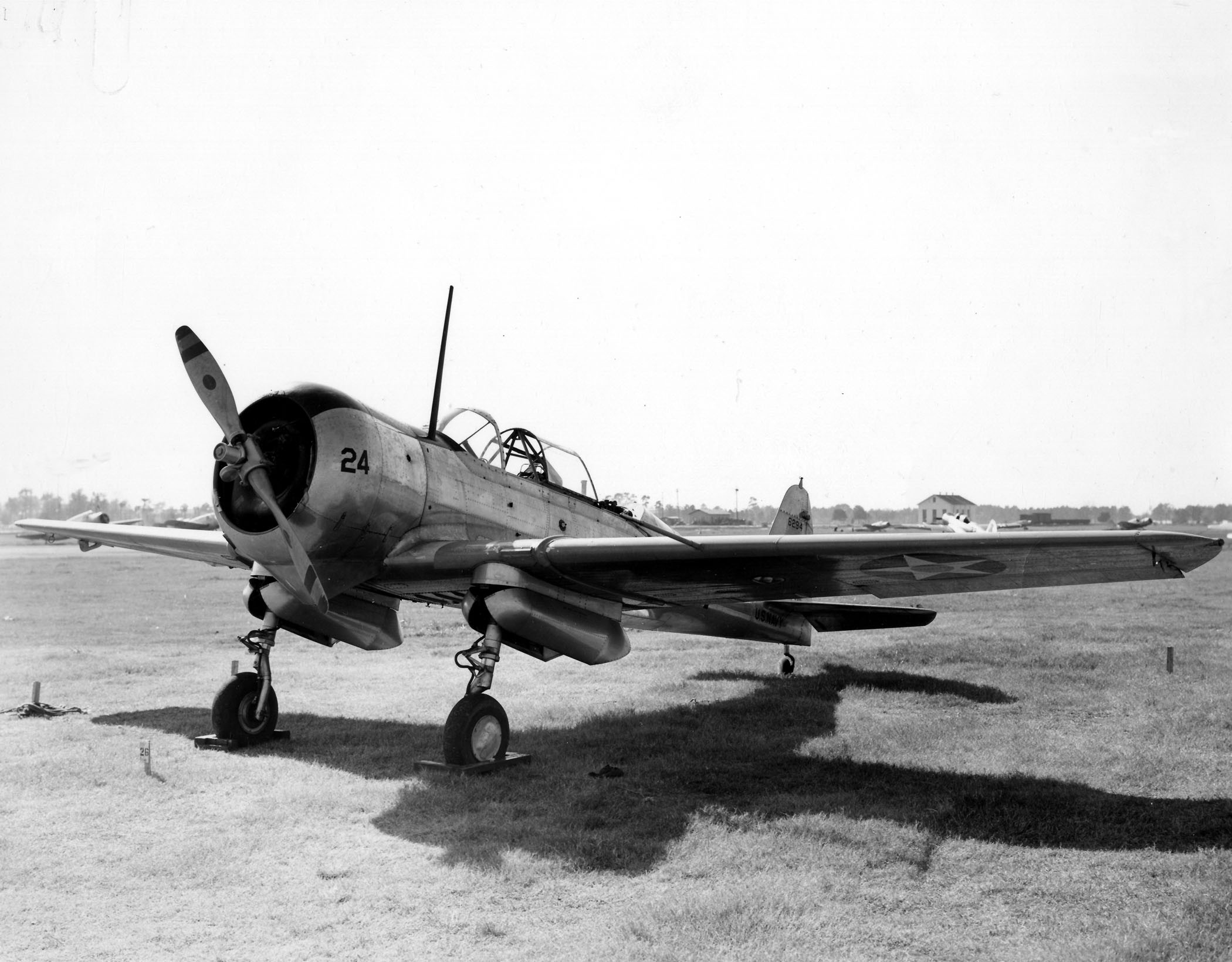
Curtiss-Wright CW-22 at NAS Jacksonville on January 8, 1942.

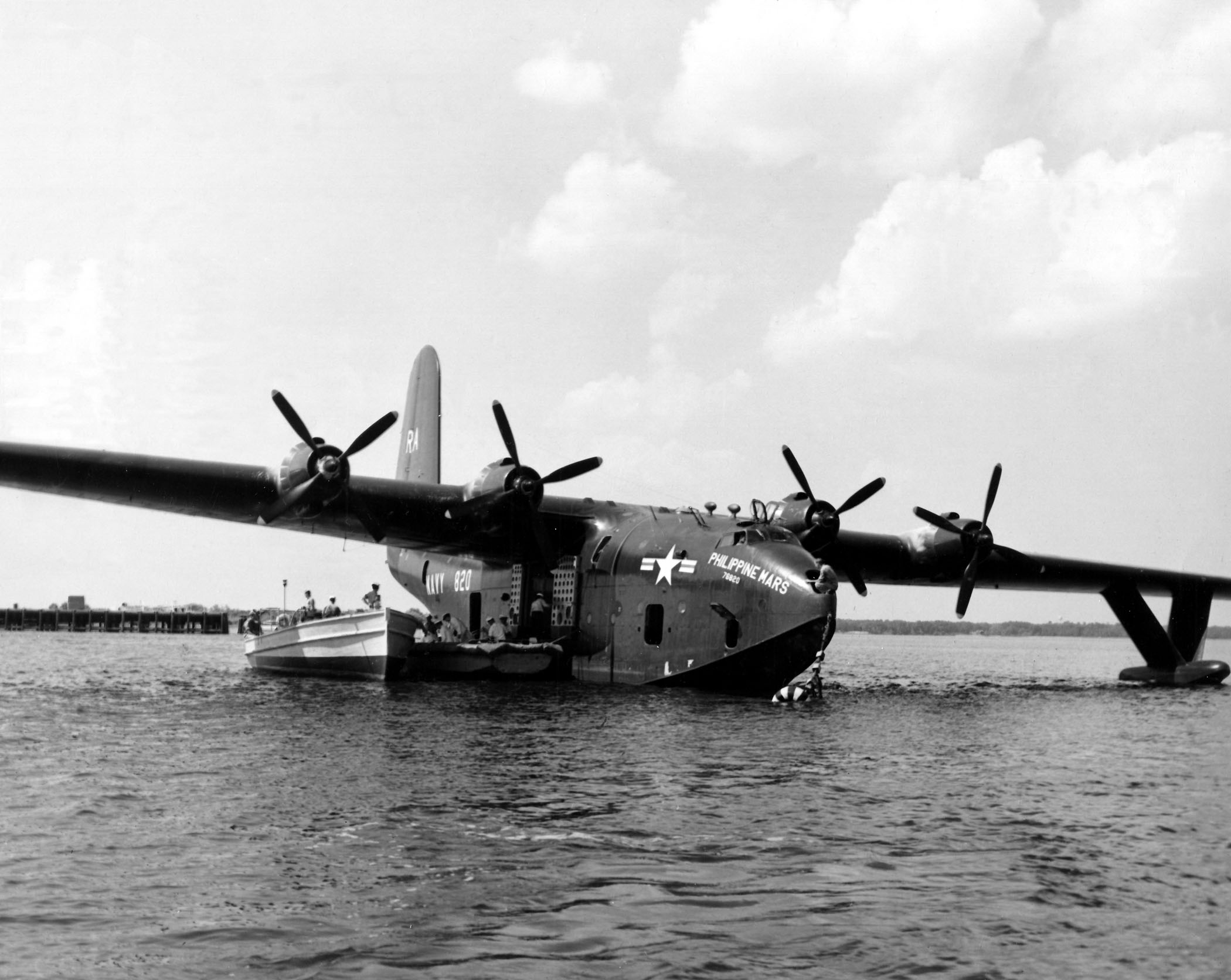
Martin JRM Mars moored off NAS Jacksonville in 1950.

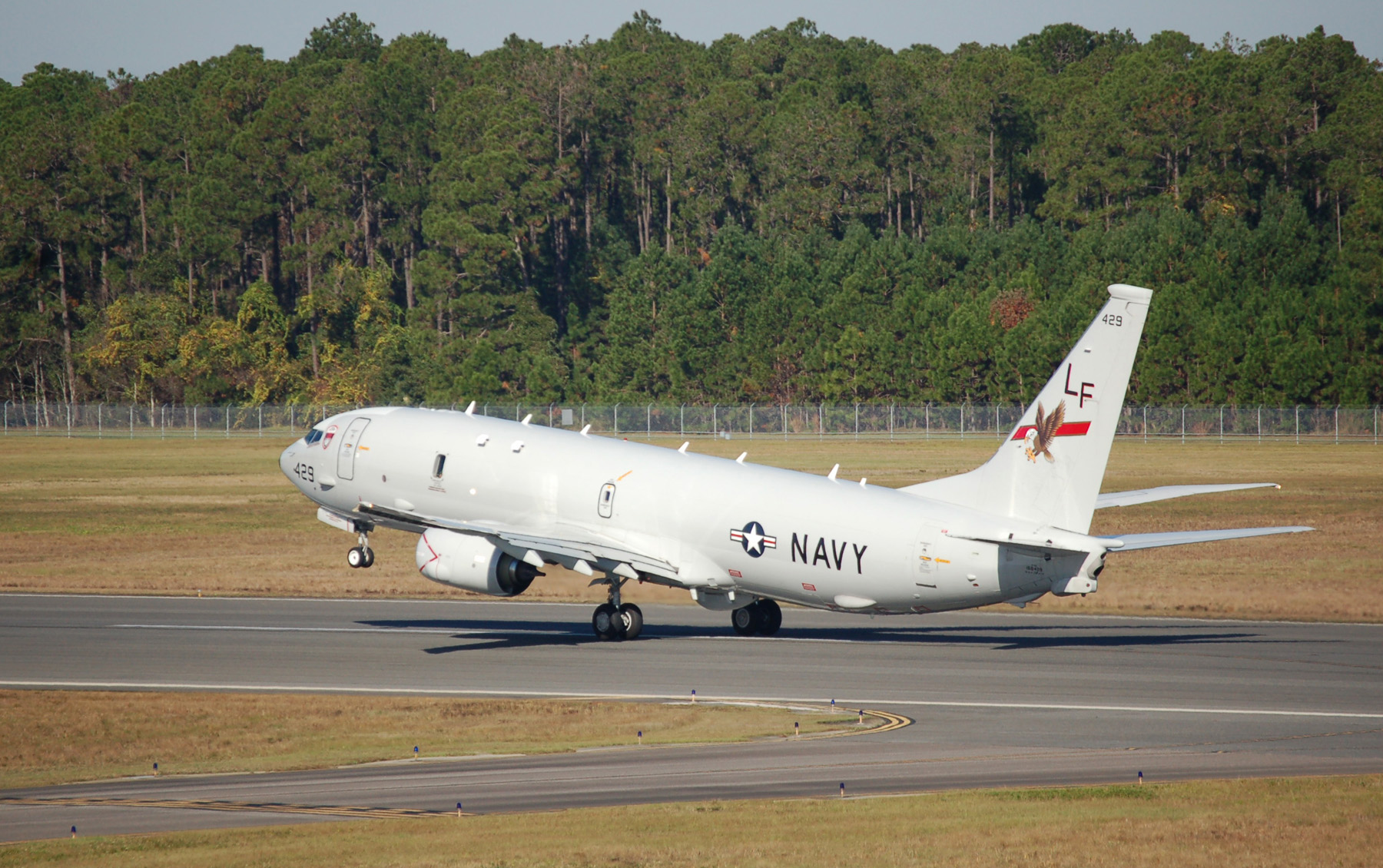
Boeing P-8 Poseidon departing NAS Jacksonville.

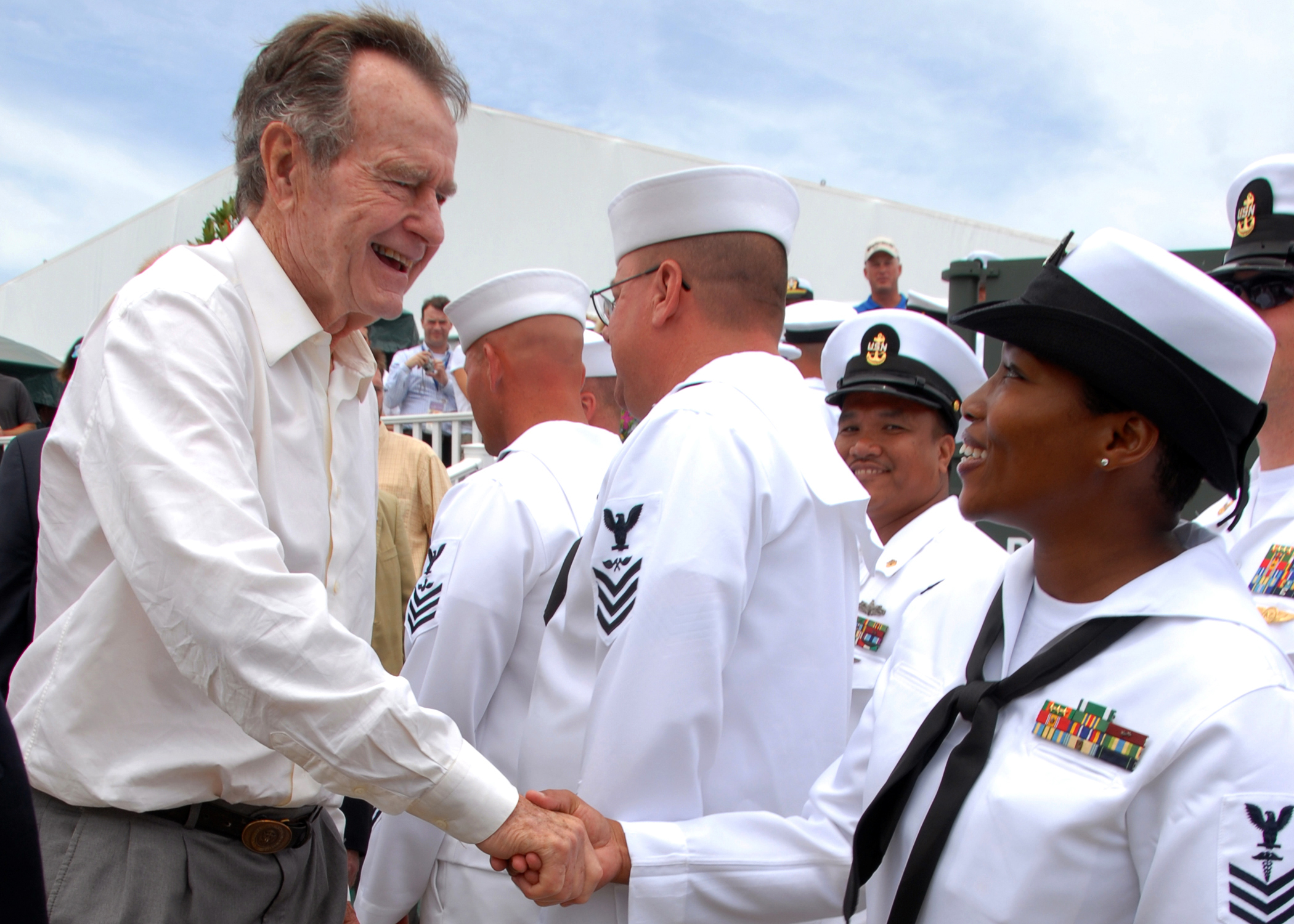
George H. W. Bush greeting NAS Jacksonville sailors.

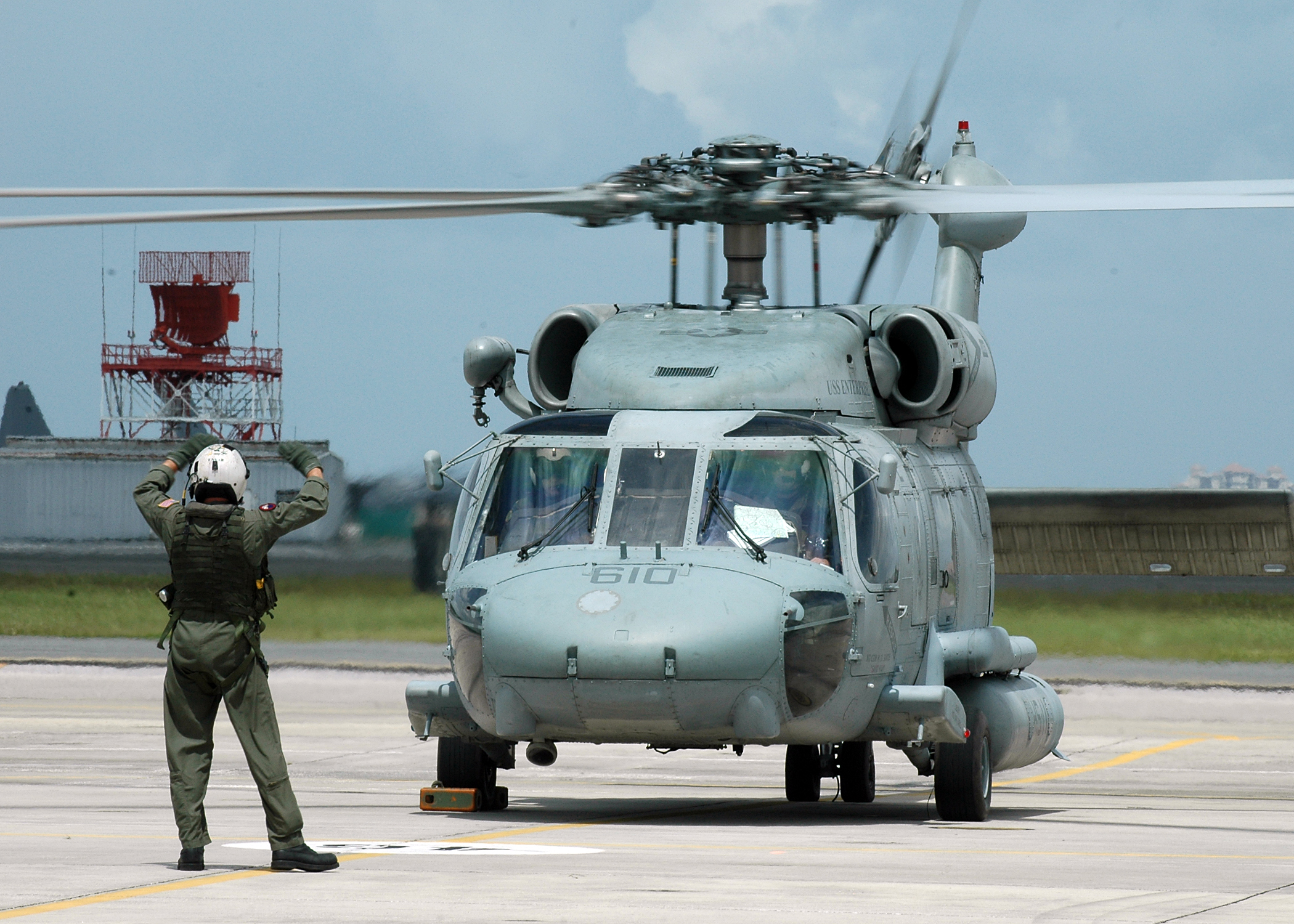
A Helicopter of Anti-Submarine Squadron (HS) 11 prepares to take off.

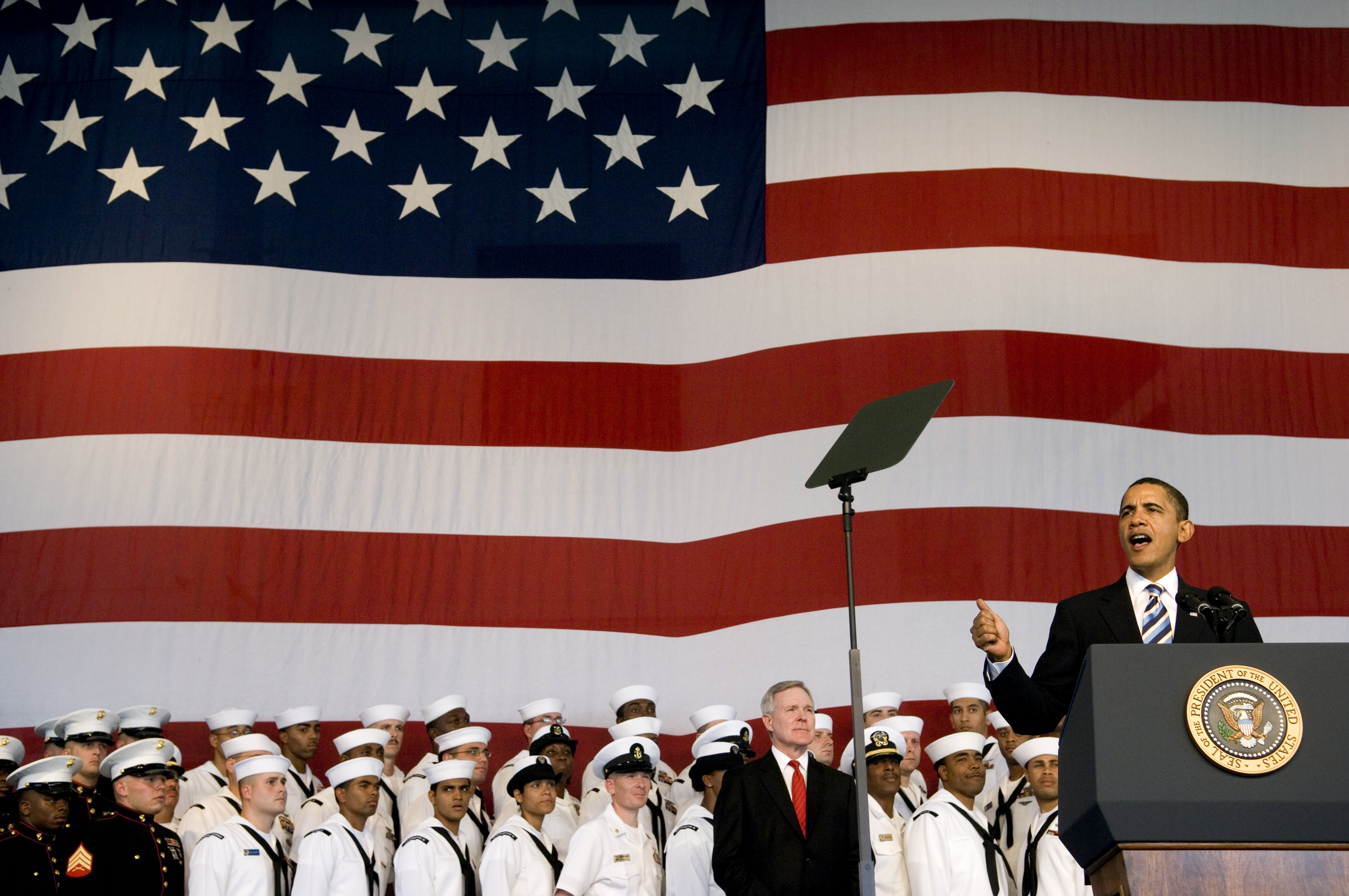
President Obama delivers remarks to an audience of Sailors and Marines at NAS Jacksonville.

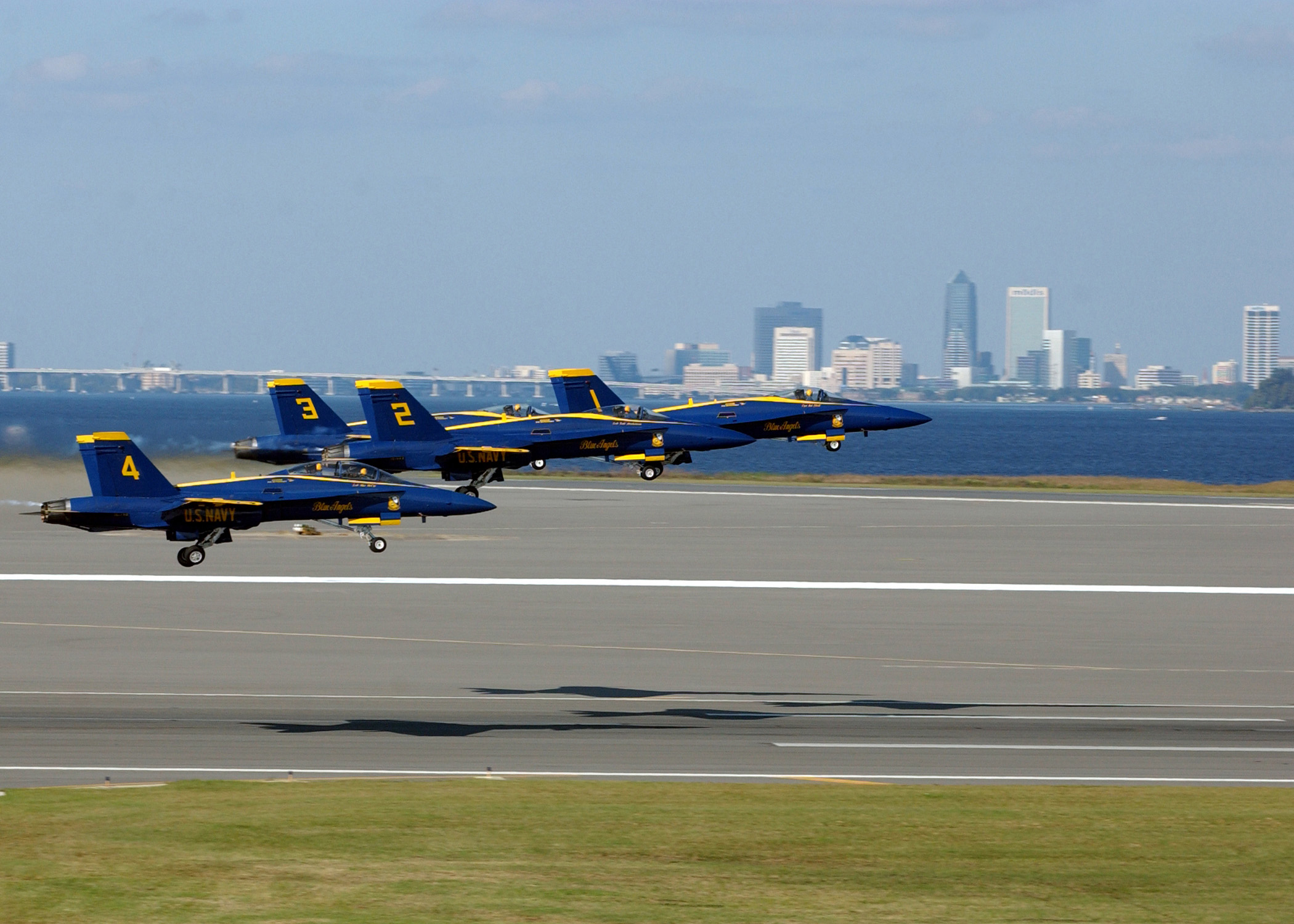
The Blue Angels performing their annual show at NAS Jacksonville.

== Accidents and incidents ==
- 3 May 2019: Miami Air International Flight 293, a Boeing 737-800, hydroplaned and experienced a runway excursion upon landing at Naval Air Station Jacksonville. The airplane came to rest in the shallow waters of St. Johns River, sustaining substantial damage. All 143 passengers and crew on board the plane survived, although 21 people aboard had minor injuries.

== See also ==
- List of United States Navy airfields
- Naval Air Station Green Cove Springs
