= Rodger W. Simpson =

American Navy rear admiral

Rodger Whitten Simpson
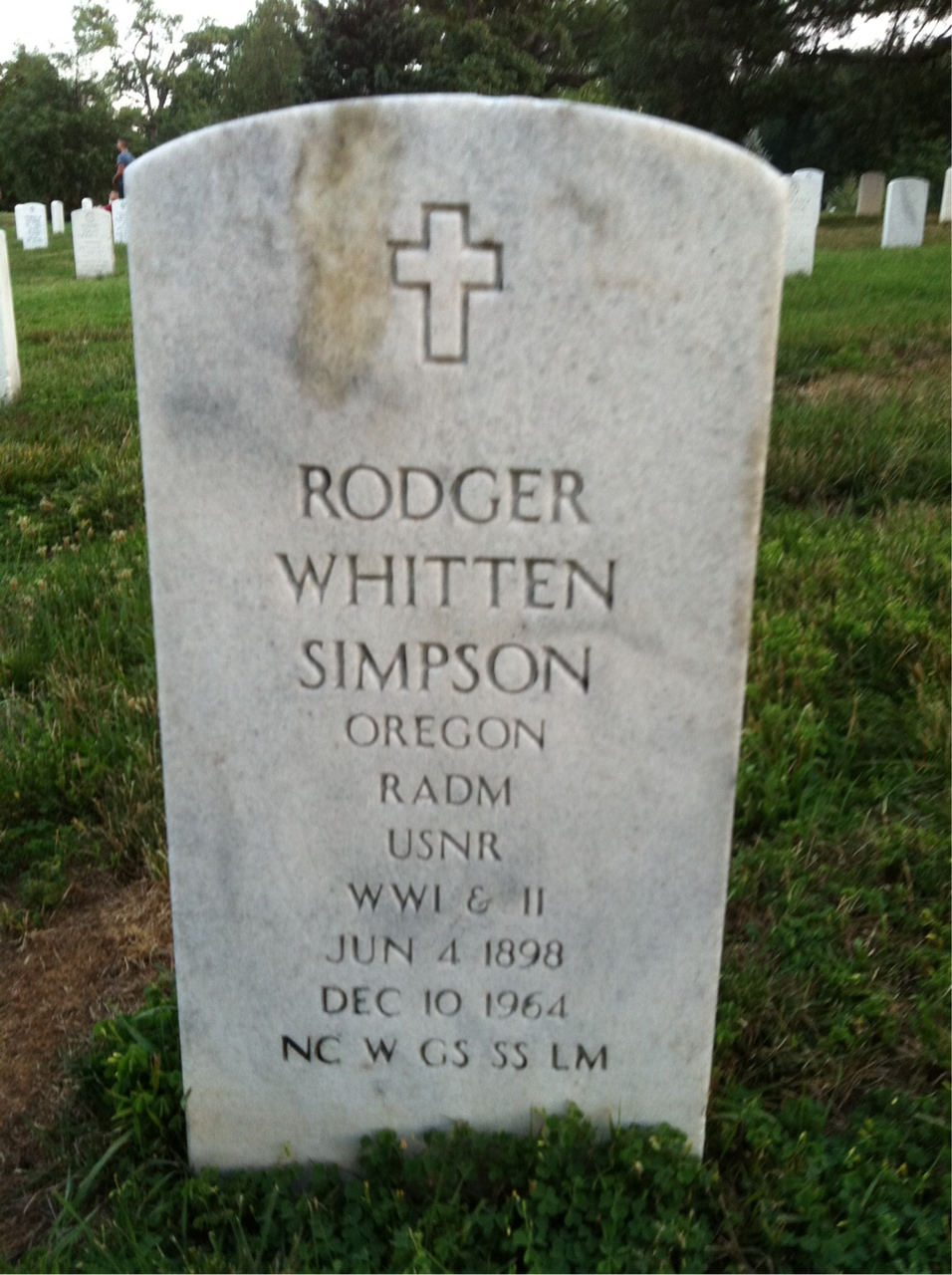
- Grave at Arlington National Cemetery
- Born: June 4, 1898; Portland, Oregon, U.S.
- Died: December 10, 1964 (aged 66)
- Military career
- Allegiance: United States of America
- Branch: United States Navy
- Rank: Rear Admiral
- Commands: Mahan (DD-364); Destroyer Division 15; Atlanta (CL-104); Task Flotilla 6
- Conflicts: World War I World War II
- Awards: Navy Cross (2); Silver Star; Legion of Merit

Rodger Whitten Simpson (June 4, 1898 – December 10, 1964) was a rear admiral of the United States Navy, who distinguished himself during World War II. The frigate USS Simpson (FFG-56) was named in his honor.

== Biography ==
Simpson attended the University of Oregon for a year before entering the United States Naval Academy in June 1917. Midshipman Simpson served on the battleship Ohio (BB-12), which was stationed in the Atlantic Ocean and part of Atlantic Fleet during World War I. Simpson was commissioned an ensign during June 1920, graduating in the class of 1921.

He commanded the destroyer Mahan (DD-364) as a lieutenant commander during the Battle of the Santa Cruz Islands on 26 October 1942. Promoted to commander, he commanded Destroyer Division (DesDiv) 15, made up of the Sterett (DD-407), Stack (DD-406), and Lang (DD-399), which, along with three ships of DesDiv 12 under Commander Frederick Moosbrugger, sank three Japanese destroyers and damaged one in the Battle of Vella Gulf, 6–7 August 1943.

Simpson also served tours as commander, Training Command, Marianas; commander, Fleet Training Group, Western Pacific; Commander, Underway Training Unit, Guam; commanding officer, Atlanta (CL-104); and commanding officer, Naval Station Treasure Island.

On April 6, 1944, Commodore Simpson commanded Task Flotilla 6. He orchestrated and planned the rescue of over 7,500 Allied prisoners of war and civilians interned in Japanese concentration camps.

In 1945, the Navy's Task Group 30.6 commanded by Commodore Simpson arrived in Tokyo Bay to undertake the emergency evacuation of Allied POWs in waterfront areas. Accompanying Simpson were Commander Harold E. Stassen, USNR, flag secretary to commander, Third Fleet, and Admiral William F. Halsey.

For this rescue, he was honored with the Legion of Merit. The citation in part reads, ". . . by freeing the prisoners before the actual signing of the surrender, he saved the lives of hundreds of sick and starving U.S. service people . . . ."

Simpson retired in 1951.

== Duty stations ==
- USS Ohio (BB-12)
- USS Brooklyn (CL-40)
- USS Farquhar (DE-139)
- USS Twiggs (DD-591)
- USS Sloat (DE-245)
- USS William Jones (DD-308)
- USS Ludlow (DD-438)
- USS Whippoorwill (AMS-207)

== Awards and decorations ==
Among Rear Admiral Simpson's decorations and medals were the following:

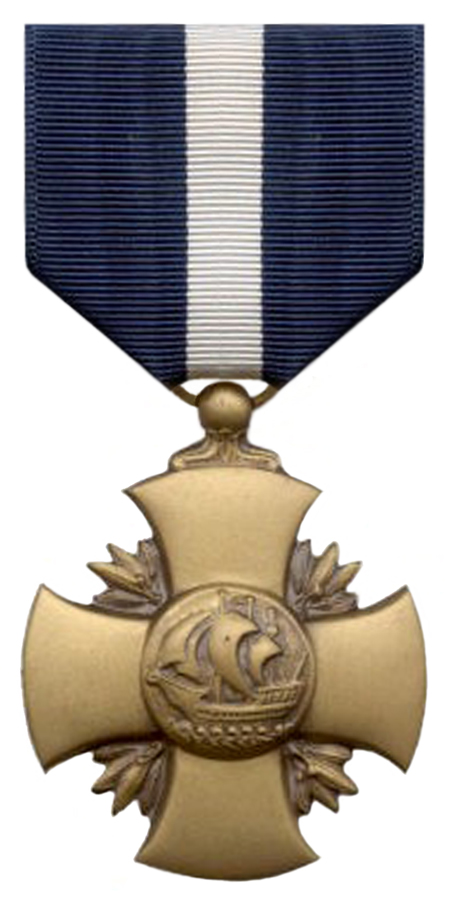
Navy Cross

Navy Cross with Gold Star
Silver Star
Legion of Merit
World War I Victory Medal Atlantic Fleet Clasp, USS Ohio (BB-12)
American Defense Service Medal Fleet Clasp
American Campaign Medal
World War II Victory Medal
National Defense Service Medal
Asiatic-Pacific Campaign Medal with two Silver Stars (ten engagements)
Philippine Liberation Medal

== Photographs ==
- Rodger W. Simpson, Change of Command 1948 USS Atlanta
- Rear Admiral Simpson Questioning Japanese Prisoners
- Simpson And Cmdr Harold Stassen
- Liberation of Allied Prisoners of War
