= HSM-70 =

Helicopter Maritime Strike Squadron 70
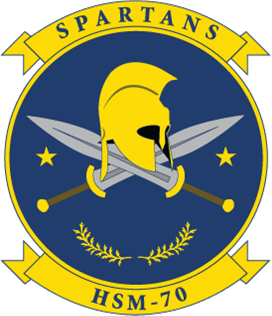
- Active: 1 March 2008–present
- Country: United States of America
- Branch: United States Navy
- Type: Navy Helicopter Squadron
- Part of: Carrier Air Wing Eight; Commander, Helicopter Maritime Strike Wing Atlantic
- Garrison/HQ: NAS Jacksonville
- Nickname: "Spartans"
- Colors: Blue and yellow

Helicopter Maritime Strike Squadron 70 (HSM-70) "Spartans" is a United States Navy helicopter squadron based at NAS Jacksonville, Jacksonville, Florida, United States. The squadron is equipped with the Sikorsky MH-60R Seahawk. Currently, HSM-70 is attached to Carrier Air Wing Eight.

== 2025-2026 ==
In November 2025, HSM-70 within CVW-8 onboard the USS Gerald R Ford were re-tasked from their scheduled deployment in the Mediterranean and sent to the Caribbean to support Operation Southern Spear. After completing their support of Southern Spear in early February 2026, HSM-70 and CVW-8 were again deployed across the Atlantic and into the Mediterranean to support potential combat operations against Iran.

In late Feb 2026, HSM-70 and their MH-60Rs undertook combat sorties within Operation Epic Fury against Iran. Combat sorties off the Ford began from the Eastern Mediterranean and moved to the Red Sea after close to a week of combat.

== See also ==
- Carrier Air Wing Eight (CVW-8)
- History of the United States Navy
- U.S. Navy Helicopter Squadrons
