= HSM-72 =

Helicopter Maritime Strike Squadron 72 (HSM-72)
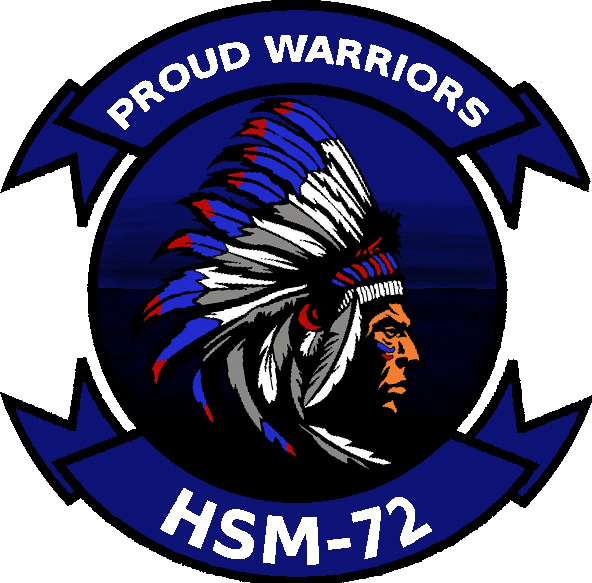
- HSM-72 Proud Warriors Insignia
- Active: 5 October 1984 - present
- Country: United States of America
- Branch: United States Navy
- Type: Navy Helicopter Squadron
- Role: Surface Warfare (SUW); Anti-Submarine Warfare (ASW)
- Part of: CVW-1
- Garrison/HQ: NAS Jacksonville
- Nickname: "Proud Warriors"
- Mottos: "Principled, Disciplined, Confident"
- Colors: Red and Blue
- Mascot: Native American Indian
- Engagements: Global War on Terror; Operation Prosperity Guardian; Operation Poseidon Archer

Commanders
- Current commander: CDR Christopher R. Jenkins

HSM-72 Helicopter Maritime Strike Squadron Seven-Two, also known as Proud Warriors, is a helicopter squadron of the United States Navy based at Naval Air Station Jacksonville. The Proud Warriors are a part of Carrier Air Wing One and deploy aboard USS Harry S. Truman (CVN-75). The squadron was established as Helicopter Antisubmarine Squadron (Light) Forty Two (HSL-42) on 5 October 1984

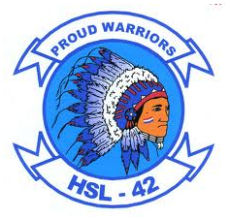
Squadron insignia during period of designation as HSL-42

== Mission ==
The squadron employs the MH-60R multi-mission helicopter. Primary missions include Anti-Submarine Warfare (ASW), Anti-Surface Warfare (SUW), Command, Control, Communications (CCC), Command and Control (C2) Search and Rescue (SAR), Medical Evacuation (MEDEVAC), Vertical Replenishment (VERTREP), Naval Surface Fire Support (NSFS), and Communications Relay (COMREL).

== Transition from HSL-42 ==
HSL-42 was redesignated HSM-72 on 15 January 2013 at Naval Air Station Jacksonville. The change reflected their transition from employing the SH-60B to the MH-60R, as well as from a detachment-based, expeditionary squadron to its realignment in support of a carrier air wing. As part of this transition, then-HSL-42 relocated to NAS Jacksonville from their previous home of Naval Station Mayport.

=== History ===
In late September 2024, HSM-72 and their MH-60Rs departed the US as part of CVW-1 on a scheduled deployment aboard the USS Harry S. Truman (CVN-75).

Following multiple exercises with European militaries, HSM-72 and CVW-1 were ordered to operate in the Red Sea in defense of international shipping lanes and Israel against Houthi/Iran proxy military unit attacks from Yemen. HSM-72 and CVW-1 arrived in the CENTCOM AOR in mid December 2024 with combat operations against the Houthis/Iranians commencing upon arrival to the Red Sea.

Airstrikes were undertaken against the Houthis/Iranians for much of the later half of December 2024 through April 2025. Strikes against the Houthis/Iranian proxy military units in Yemen increased significantly following March 15, 2025, with HSM-72 and CVW-1 conducting increased sorties on a larger set of enemy targets.

== Awards ==
- Meritorious Unit Commendation
- National Defense Service Medal
- Global War on Terrorism Service Medal
- Global War on Terrorism Expeditionary Medal
- Navy E Ribbon
- Chief of Naval Operations Aviation Safety Award
- Arleigh Burke Fleet Trophy
- Captain Arnold Jay Isbell Trophy
- Blue "M" for Medical Readiness
- CHSMWINGLANT Talon Award

== See also ==
- History of the United States Navy
- List of United States Navy aircraft squadrons
