= HSM-46 =

Helicopter Maritime Strike Squadron Four Six
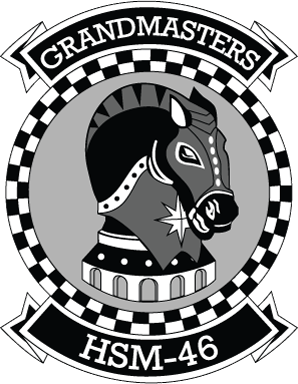
- HSM-46 Insignia
- Country: United States
- Branch: United States Navy
- Type: Navy Helicopter Squadron
- Role: Anti-submarine warfare (ASW); Anti-surface warfare (ASUW); Search and rescue (SAR); Medical evacuation (MEDEVAC); Vertical replenishment (VERTREP); Naval Surface Fire Support (NSFS); Communications Relay (COMREL)
- Size: 300
- Part of: Carrier Air Wing 7 USS George H. W. Bush
- Garrison/HQ: Naval Air Station Jacksonville
- Nickname: Grandmasters
- Motto: Set the standard
- Colors
- Mascot: Knight (chess piece)
- Anniversaries: Established at Mayport, Florida, on 7 April 1988
- Engagements: Operation Enduring Freedom; Operation Iraqi Freedom; Global War on Terror
- Website: http://www.public.navy.mil/airfor/hsm46/

Commanders
- Commanding Officer: CDR Andrew "Megan" Howerton
- Executive Officer: CDR Kyle "Princess" Wiest
- Command Master Chief: CMDCM Monica Bolton

Aircraft flown
- Multirole helicopter: MH-60R Seahawk MH-60R Seahawk

Helicopter Maritime Strike Four Six (HSM-46), the "Grandmasters", are a United States Navy helicopter squadron based at Naval Air Station Jacksonville, Florida. HSM-46 deploys aboard cruisers, destroyers, and aircraft carriers in independent operations or in support of strike groups. The squadron was established on 7 April 1988 as Helicopter Antisubmarine Squadron (Light) Forty Six (HSL-46)

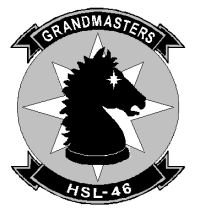
Squadron insignia during period of designation as HSL-46

== Mission and history ==
HSM-46 deploys Light Airborne Multi-Purpose System (LAMPS) program helicopters to United States Navy warships performing search and rescue, vertical replenishment, medical evacuation, and communications relay and combat missions. Established at Mayport, Florida, on 7 April 1988, HSM-46 currently deploys ten detachments aboard Atlantic Fleet ships. A detachment normally consists of one or two aircraft, five to six pilots, two to three sensor operators, a maintenance chief, and eight to twelve maintenance personnel. A typical detachment deploys with its assigned ship for six months, with several shorter work-up cruises prior to the long deployment. The squadron is directly responsible to Commander, Helicopter Maritime Strike Wing, U.S. Atlantic Fleet.

The squadron is currently assigned to Carrier Air Wing 7 on board the aircraft carrier USS George H. W. Bush, replacing HSM-79.

In late April 2026, HSM-46, as part of CVW 7 onboard the George H. W. Bush entered the CENTCOM AOR. HSM-46’s MH-60Rs began combat operations against Iran and undertook naval blockade sorties within Operation Epic Fury.

== Transition from HSL-46 ==
HSL-46 was re-designated HSM-46 in March 2012 at Naval Station Mayport.

== See also ==
- History of the United States Navy
- US Navy Helicopter Squadrons
- MH-60R
