= HSM-74 =

Helicopter Maritime Strike Squadron Seven Four
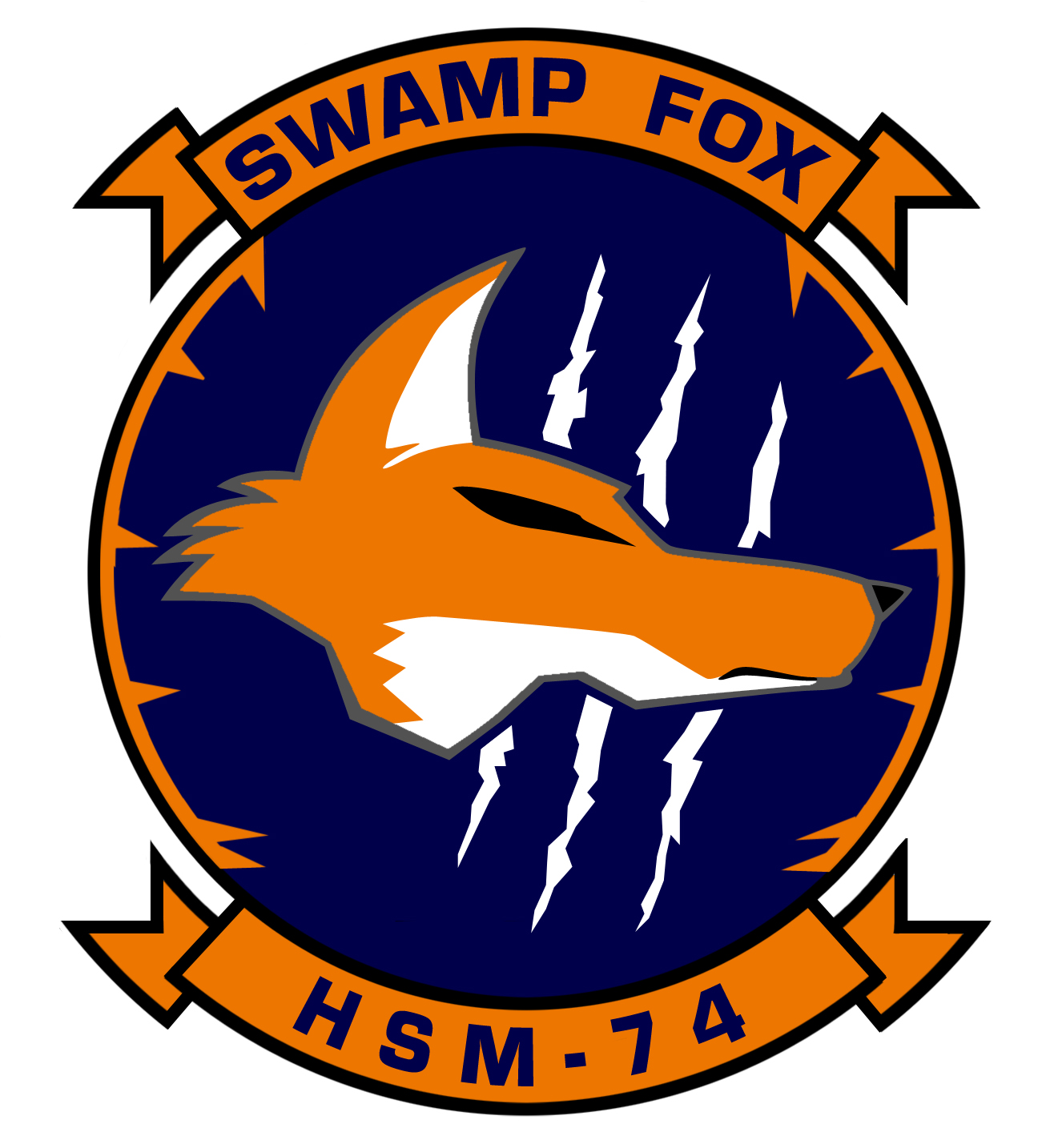
- HSM-74 Insignia
- Active: 21 Aug 1986 to present
- Country: United States of America
- Branch: United States Navy
- Type: Navy Helicopter Squadron
- Role: Surface Warfare (SUW); Anti-Submarine Warfare (ASW)
- Part of: Carrier Air Wing Three
- Garrison/HQ: Naval Air Station Jacksonville
- Nickname: "Swamp Foxes"
- Engagements: Operation Inherent Resolve; Operation Enduring Freedom; Operation Iraqi Freedom; Global War on Terror; Operation Prosperity Guardian
- Decorations: 2015 Battle Effectiveness Award; 2013 Battle Effectiveness Award; 2013 Captain Arnold J. Isbell Trophy; 2013 COMHSMWINGLANT Aviation Safety; Award: FY15 Retention Excellence Award; FY14 Retention Excellence Award; FY13 Retention Excellence Award; FY12 Retention Excellence Award

Commanders
- Commanding Officer: CDR Bradley J. “Swoosh” Shillito
- Executive Officer: CDR Eric Kohut
- Command Master Chief: CMDCM Simone C Milo

Helicopter Maritime Strike Seven Four (HSM-74), the "Swamp Foxes", is a United States Navy helicopter squadron based at Naval Air Station Jacksonville, Jacksonville, Florida. HSM-74 is attached to Carrier Air Wing Three and deploys aboard cruisers, destroyers, frigates, and aircraft carriers in support of a carrier strike group. It was established on 21 August 1986 as Helicopter Antisubmarine Squadron (Light) Forty Four (HSL-44)

== Mission ==
The squadron employs the MH-60R multi-mission helicopter. Primary missions include Anti-Submarine Warfare (ASW), Anti-Surface Warfare (SUW), Command, Control, Communications (CCC), Command and Control Warfare (C2W), Mobility (MOB), and Non-Combat Operations (NCO). Secondary missions consist of Search and Rescue (SAR), Medical Evacuation (MEDEVAC), Vertical Replenishment (VERTREP), Naval Surface Fire Support (NSFS), and Communications Relay (COMREL).

== Transition from HSL-44 ==
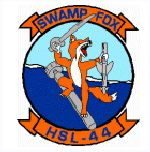
Squadron insignia during period of designation as HSL-44

HSL-44 was redesignated HSM-74 on 9 June 2011 at Naval Air Station Jacksonville. The change reflected their transition from employing the SH-60B to the MH-60R, as well as from a detachment-based, expeditionary squadron to its realignment in support of a carrier air wing. As part of this transition, then-HSL-44 relocated to NAS Jacksonville from their previous home of Naval Station Mayport in November 2009.

== General Information ==
HSM-74 operates twelve MH-60R helicopters in four combat elements. These combat elements (or CELs) consist of the carrier element and Detachments 1, 2, and 3. The carrier element deploys and maintains five helicopters while the detachments maintain two each. Each CEL can work independently of every other CEL.

In October 2023, HSM-74 deployed with Air Wing Three onboard the USS Eisenhower. HSM-74 and Air Wing Three were deployed immediately to the CENTCOM AOR and began defensive and offensive combat operations against the Houthi-Iranian military units in Yemen. HSM-74's usage of Hellfire missiles during the cruise against enemy targets was praised by Carrier Strike Group 2's Rear Admiral Marc Miguez.

== See also ==
- History of the United States Navy
- US Navy Helicopter Squadrons
- MH-60R
