= VP-16 =

Patrol Squadron 16
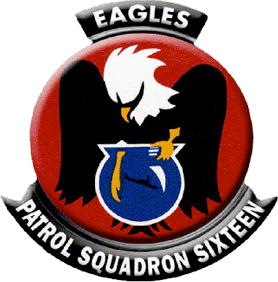
- VP-16 insignia
- Active: May 1946 - present
- Country: United States of America
- Branch: United States Navy
- Type: squadron
- Role: Maritime patrol
- Nickname(s): War Eagles
- Engagements: Vietnam War

Aircraft flown
- Patrol: PV-2; PBY-5A/6A; P2V-2/3/5/5F/SP-2E; P-3A/C; P-8A

VP-16, nicknamed the War Eagles, is an active Patrol Squadron of the U.S. Navy. It has been based at NAS Jacksonville, Florida since its founding in 1946. The squadron's mission is to operate Maritime patrol aircraft to the fleet in support of national interests. The squadron's radio callsign is "Talon," and their tailcode is "LF." Originally established as Reserve Patrol Squadron 906 (VP-906) in May 1946, it was redesignated Medium Seaplane Squadron 56 (VP-ML-56) on 15 November 1946, redesignated Patrol Squadron 741 (VP-741) in February 1950 and redesignated Patrol Squadron 16 (VP-16) on 4 February 1953. It is the third squadron to be designated VP-16; the first VP-16 was redesignated VP-41 on 1 July 1939 and the second VP-16 was redesignated VPB-16 on 1 October 1944.

== History ==
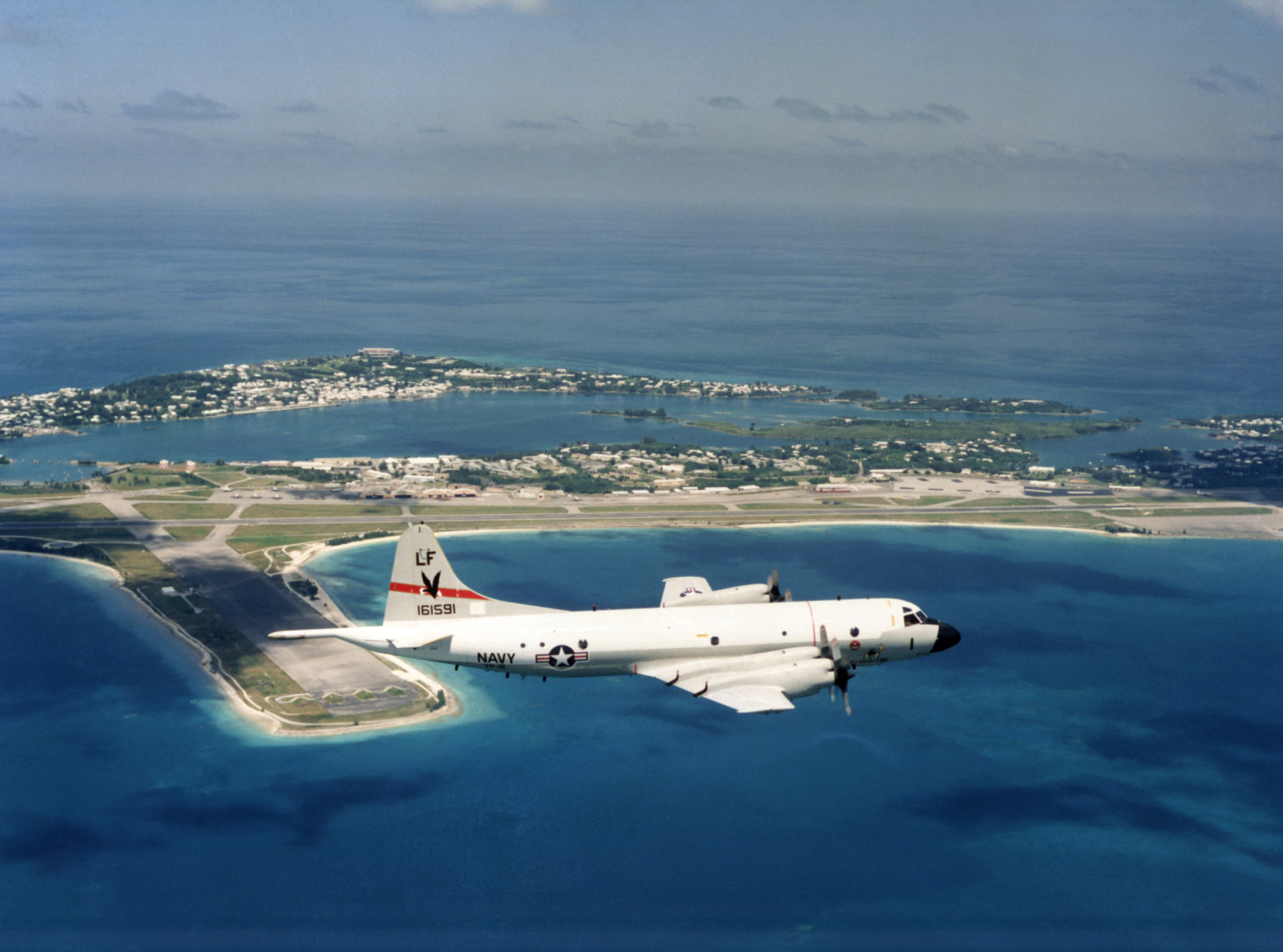
VP-16 P-3C over NAS Bermuda in 1985

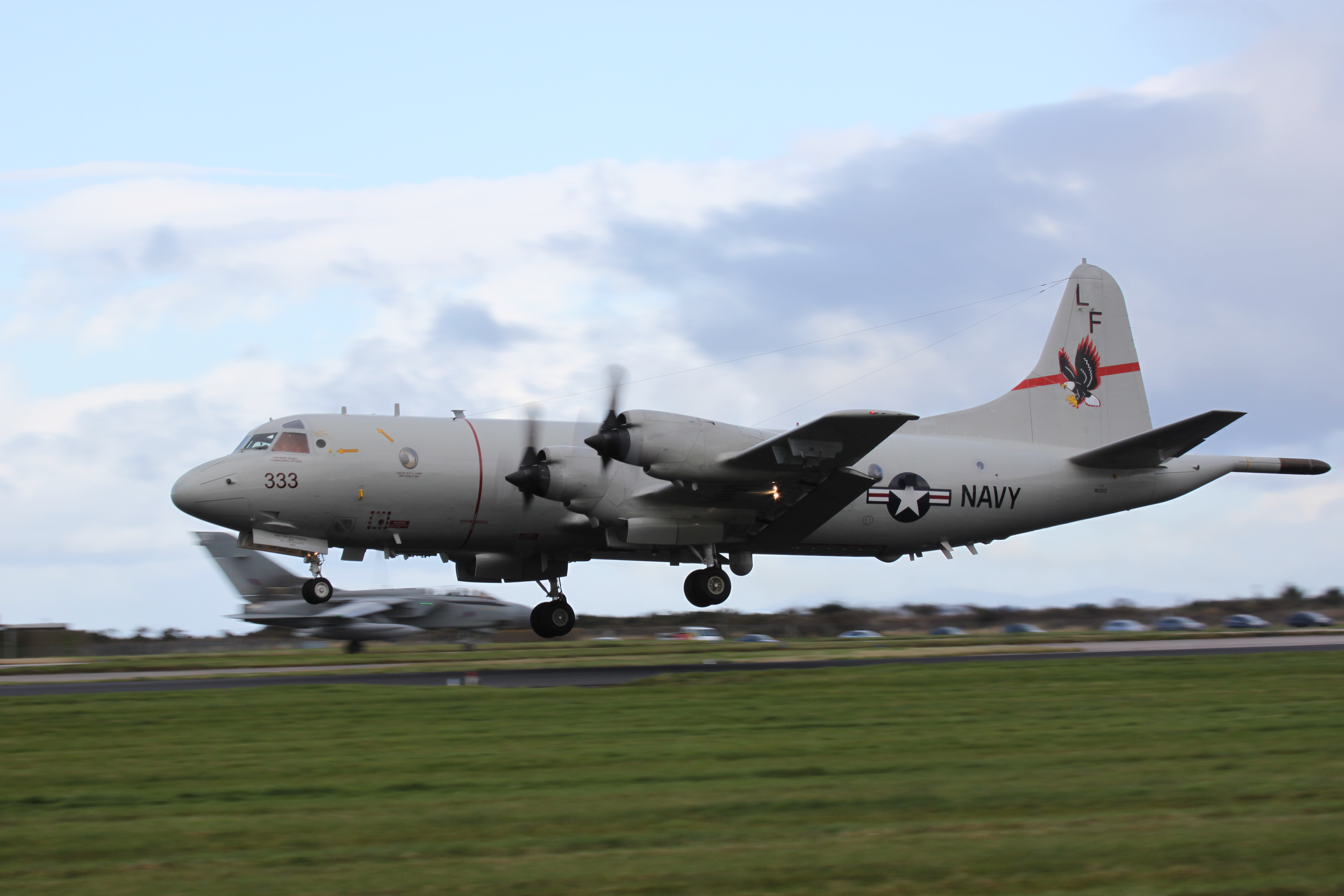
VP-16 P-3C lands in 2011

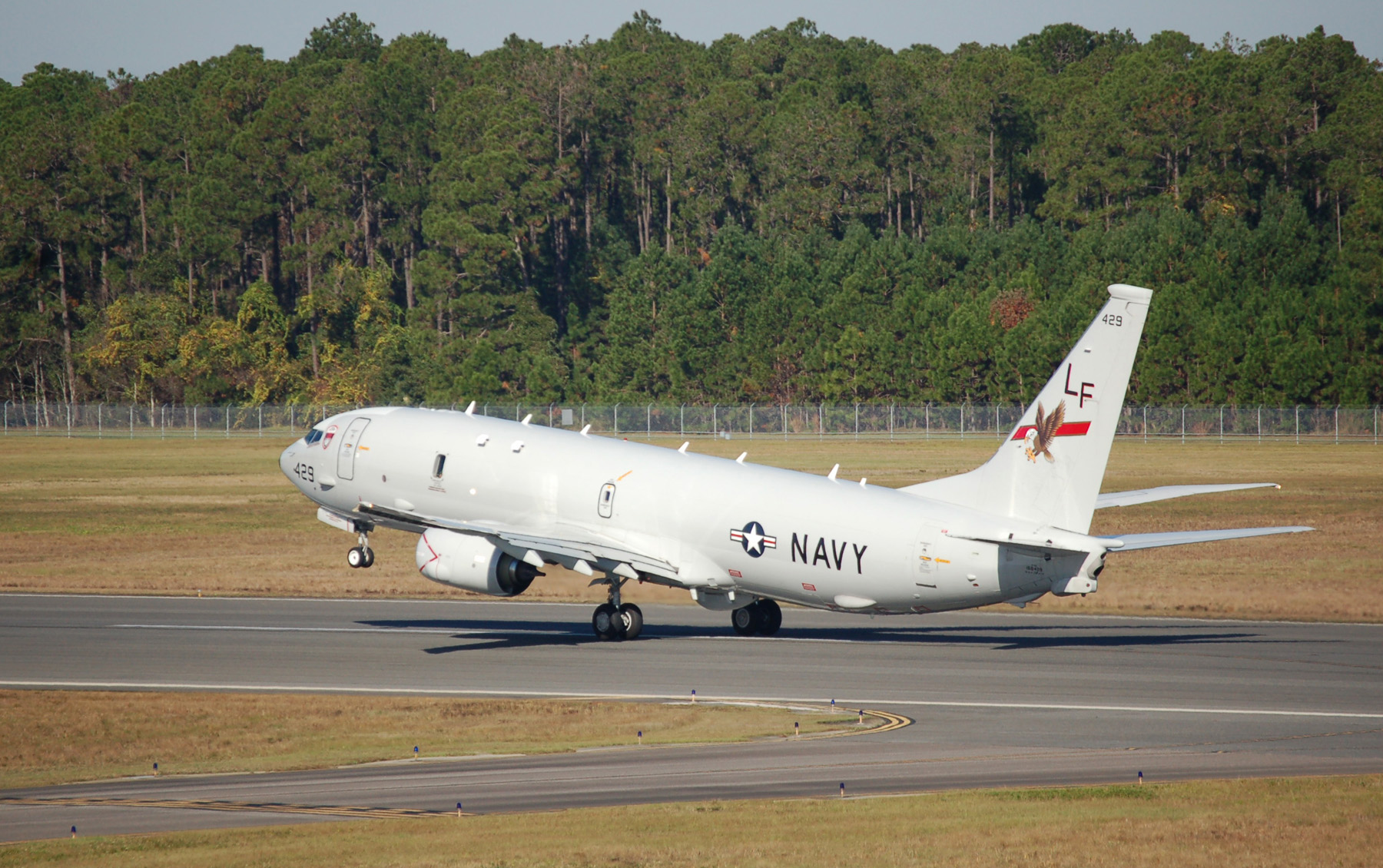
VP-16 P-8A takes off from NAS Jacksonville in 2013

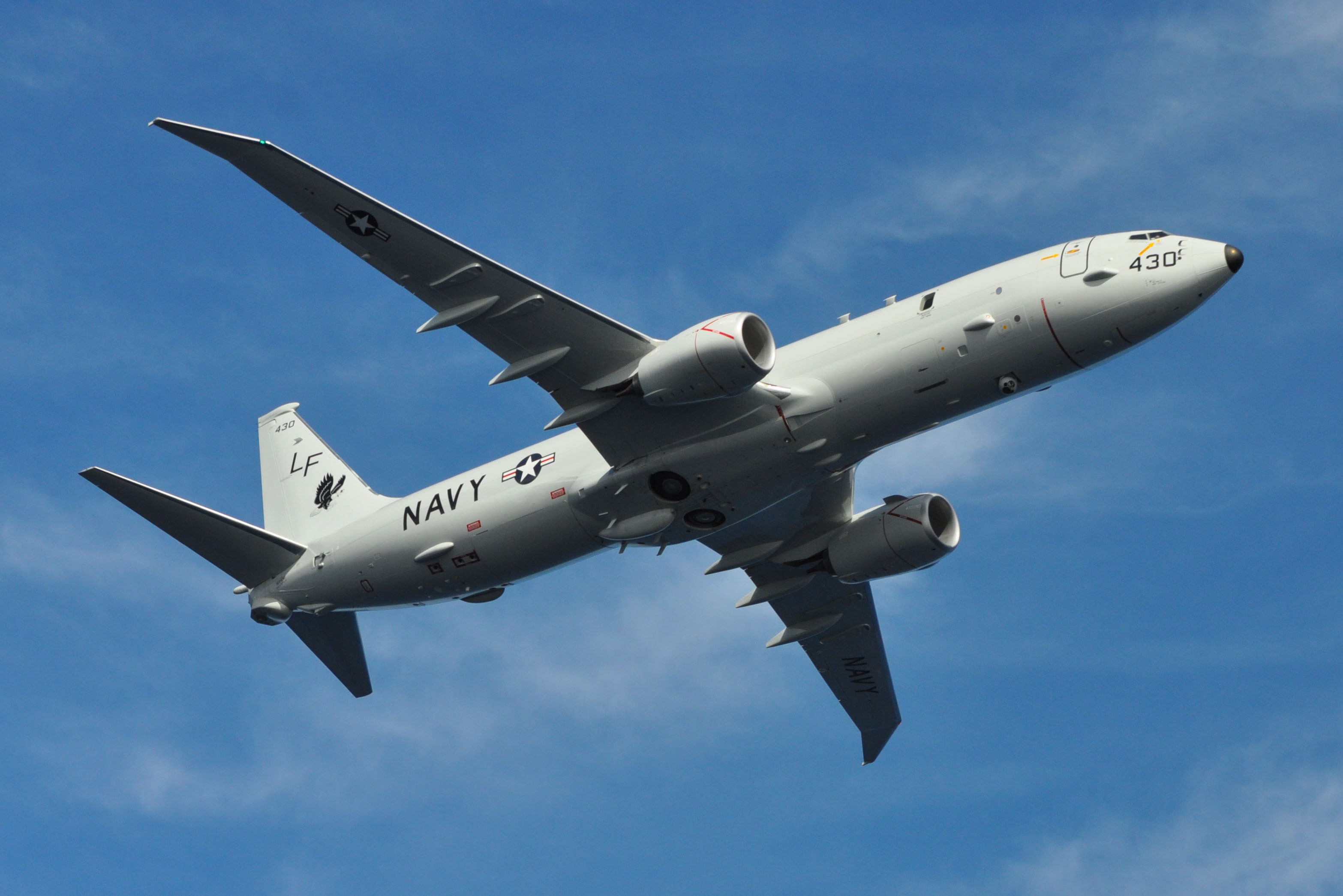
VP-16 P-8A over NAS Jacksonville in 2013

- VP-906 was established in May 1946 as a reserve squadron, home-ported at NAS Jacksonville, Florida, under the operational control of FAW-11 and administratively under Naval Air Reserve Training Command. The squadron was one of 21 reserve patrol squadrons established after the war to accommodate the large number of aircrews recently released from active duty, utilize the enormous stocks of aircraft in the inventory and serve as a pool of experienced manpower in the event that the new Cold War tensions erupted into actual war. VP-906 flew the PV-2 Harpoon and the amphibious PBY-5A/6A Catalina.
- 15 November 1946 VP-906 was redesignated VP-ML-56 while at NAS Cecil Field, Florida. Under the new designation system, reserve squadron number designations began with the number 51 and regular Navy squadrons began with 1. All reserve patrol squadrons were designated as ML. The ML designation used by the reserves stood for either Medium Patrol Squadrons flying the twin-engine PV-2 Harpoon or Medium Seaplane Squadrons flying the amphibious PBY-5A Catalina. Regular Navy patrol squadrons flying the PV-2 were designated ML also, but those flying the PBY-5A were designated AM for Amphibian.
- In February 1950 VP-ML-56 was redesignated VP-741 during the reorganization of Naval Aviation reserve units. In this period of extensive defense spending reductions the number of Naval Aviation reserve patrol squadrons was reduced from 24 in 1949 to only 9.
- On 1 Mar 1951 VP-741 was recalled to active duty, the last of the nine reserve patrol squadrons recalled for service during the Korean War. In February 1953 the decision was made to augment all of the nine reserve patrol squadrons activated during 1950 to 1951 as part of the regular Navy. VP-741 was redesignated VP-16. The redesignations did not require changes in tail codes or home ports.
- On 10 Nov 1956, the squadron deployed to NAS Keflavik, Iceland. During the Suez Crisis, the squadron was flying around the clock to protect NATO’s northern flank. After the situation was defused, VP-16 conducted a series of goodwill tours to several European countries before returning to the U.S. in April 1957.
- Mar 1960: VP-16 deployed to NS Roosevelt Roads, Puerto Rico, and participated in Operation Springboard 1960.
- May 1960: The squadron participated in test shots of the Redstone and Atlas missiles as part of Task Force 140, Project Mercury Recovery Force.
- 12 Dec 1960: VP-16 deployed to NAS Sigonella, Sicily, for a five-month tour of duty, relieving VP-5. The squadron provided shipping surveillance in the Mediterranean Sea for the U.S. Sixth Fleet.
- In January 1961, it was one of several squadrons called on to assist in the search for the Portuguese cruise liner Santa Maria after it had been hijacked by opponents of the Salazar regime.
- Between 29 November 1963 and March 1964 seven squadron aircraft operated from Guantanamo Bay Naval Base, Cuba, to provide surveillance during the Cuban Missile Crisis, relieving VP-23. The detachment was itself relieved in March 1964 by VP-11.
- 1 Dec 1964: VP-16 relieved VP-49 at NAS Bermuda. This was the first deployment for the squadron in its new P-3A Orion aircraft.
- 23 Mar 1965: The squadron participated in operations involving the launching and recovery of the Gemini 3 space capsule.
- 15 Feb 1966: A detachment of three aircraft was sent to RAF Ascension Island in support of the project Apollo-Saturn 201 flight, Task Force 140. This operation was the first uncrewed spacecraft of the Apollo series to be fired into suborbital flight by a Saturn rocket.
- On 2 December 1966: VP-17 deployed to Naval Station Sangley Point in the Philippines. A detachment was based at U-Tapao Royal Thai Navy Airfield, Thailand and participated in the Vietnam War. During this deployment the squadron missions included Market Time patrols to interdict supplies by sea from North Vietnam, Yankee Team patrols, Ocean Surveillance Air Patrol, and Special Ocean Surveillance Air Patrols. Patrols were often conducted within 12 miles of the coasts of North Vietnam and throughout the Gulf of Tonkin. The squadron completed over 500 missions during its only tour in the Vietnam zone of operations.
- 12 December 1967: VP-16 deployed to Naval Station Rota Spain in southern Spain, as the first P-3 Orion detachment to operate from a Mediterranean base.
- January 1971: VP-16 retrofitted all of its P-3A aircraft with the DIFAR advanced submarine detection system. In July, VP-16 deployed to NAS Sigonella, to test their newly outfitted DIFAR aircraft. The squadron conducted extensive testing of the new equipment during numerous exercises in the Mediterranean Sea.
- 25 October – 2 November 1983: VP-16 provided several aircraft and crews for patrols in the vicinity of Grenada during Operation Urgent Fury, the U.S. Invasion of Grenada.
- August 1985: VP-16 deployed to NAS Bermuda. During the deployment three-aircraft detachments were maintained at NS Roosevelt Roads, to participate in Operation Hat Trick II, drug interdiction patrols in the Caribbean.
- 10 August 1988: VP-16 deployed to Bermuda, relieving VP-24. The squadron participated in Operation Checkmate 7, interdicting suspected drug trafficking in the Caribbean.
- January 2013: VP-16 become the first U.S. Navy squadron to transition from the P-3C Orion to the P-8A.
- July 2014: Aircraft from VP-16 return home after the U.S. Navy's first ever P-8A Poseidon overseas deployment. Lasting six months, the aircraft were based at Kadena AFB, Japan.

== Aircraft assignment ==
The squadron first received the following aircraft on the dates shown:

- PV-2 - May 1946
- PBY-5A/6A - May 1946
- P2V-2/3 - 1950
- P2V-5 - February 1955
- P2V-5F - March 1956
- SP-2E - December 1962
- P-3A - July 1964
- P-3A DIFAR - January 1971
- P-3C - August 1973
- P-3C UII.5 - June 1983
- P-3C UIIIR - October 1990
- P-8A - March 2012

== See also ==
- List of Lockheed P-3 Orion variants
- List of United States Navy aircraft squadrons
- List of inactive United States Navy aircraft squadrons
- List of squadrons in the Dictionary of American Naval Aviation Squadrons
