= War against the Islamic State aerial order of battle =

American and allied aerial forces military intervention against ISIS

Land air bases used by anti-ISIL air forces. Area occupied by ISIL as of 21 October 2015.

This is the Military intervention against ISIS aerial order of battle, which lists the American forces and allies aerial assets that have taken part in the Military intervention against ISIS between June 2014 and the present day.

== Sea deployments ==
=== Carriers ===
==== France ====
- Charles de Gaulle strike group (30 September 2016 – December 2016).
  - Flottille 35F using Aérospatiale Alouette III.
  - Flottille 11F using Dassault Rafale M.
  - Flottille 12F using Dassault Rafale M.
  - Flottille 36F using Eurocopter AS365 Dauphin.
  - Flottille 31F using NHIndustries NH90 NFH Caïman.
  - Flottille 33F using NHIndustries NH90 NFH Caïman.
  - Flottille 4F using Northrop Grumman E-2C Hawkeye.

==== Russia ====
- Admiral Kuznetsov (8 November 2016 – January 2017 or later)
  - 100th Independent Shipborne Fighter Aviation Regiment using Mikoyan Mig-29KR/KUBRs.
  - 279th Independent Shipborne Fighter Aviation Regiment using Sukhoi Su-33s and Mikoyan MiG-29KR/KUBRs, deployed from Severomorsk-3 in the Northern Fleet
  - 7050th Air Base using Kamov Ka-27PS, Kamov Ka-31R and Kamov Ka-29s.
  - A Test and Evaluation Unit using Kamov Ka-52Ks.

==== United Kingdom ====
- HMS Queen Elizabeth carrier strike group 21 (June 20, 2021 – present)
  - No. 617 Squadron RAF using Lockheed Martin F-35B Lightning
  - 820 Naval Air Squadron with AgustaWestland Merlin HM.2
  - 845 Naval Air Squadron with Merlin HC.4

==== United States ====
- USS George H.W. Bush carrier strike group (June 2014 – late October 2014; February 2017 – present)
  - DESRON 22 using Arleigh Burke-class destroyers.
  - Strike Fighter Squadron 213 (VFA-213) using Boeing F/A-18F Super Hornets
  - VFA-87 using McDonnell Douglas F/A-18C Hornets.
  - VFA-31 using Boeing F/A-18E Super Hornets.
  - VFA-15 using McDonnell Douglas F/A-18C Hornets.
  - VAQ-134 using Northrop Grumman EA-6B Prowler. (2014)
  - VAQ-131 using Boeing EA-18G Growlers. (2017)
  - VFA-37 using McDonnell Douglas F/A-18C Hornets. (2017)
  - HSM-70 using Sikorsky MH-60R Seahawks. (2017)
  - HSC-9 using Sikorsky MH-60S Seahawks. (2017)
- USS Carl Vinson carrier strike group (late October 2014 – late March 2015)
  - DESRON 1 using Arleigh Burke-class destroyers.
  - VFA-113 using McDonnell Douglas F/A-18C Hornets.
  - VFA-94 using McDonnell Douglas F/A-18C Hornets.
  - VFA-81 using Boeing F/A-18E Super Hornets.
  - VFA-22 using Boeing F/A-18F Super Hornets.
- USS Theodore Roosevelt carrier strike group (late March 2015 – 13 October 2015)
  - DESRON 2 using Arleigh Burke-class destroyers.
  - VMFA-251 Marine Fighter Attack Squadron 251 (VMFA-251) "Thunderbolts" using McDonnell Douglas F/A-18C(N) Hornets. (USMC Unit)
  - VFA-211 using Boeing F/A-18F Super Hornets.
  - VFA-136 using Boeing F/A-18E Super Hornets.
  - VFA-11 using Boeing F/A-18F Super Hornets.
- USS Harry S. Truman carrier strike group (December 2015 – July 2016)
  - DESRON 28 using Arleigh Burke-class destroyers.
  - VFA-25 using Boeing F/A-18E Super Hornets.
  - VFA-83 using McDonnell Douglas F/A-18C Hornets.
  - VFA-103 using Boeing F/A-18F Super Hornets.
  - VFA-143 using Boeing F/A-18E Super Hornets.
- USS Dwight D. Eisenhower carrier strike group (June 2016 – 26 December 2016)
  - DESRON 26 using Arleigh Burke-class destroyers.
  - VFA-32 using Boeing F/A-18F Super Hornets.
  - VFA-86 using McDonnell Douglas F/A-18E Hornets.
  - VFA-105 using Boeing F/A-18E Super Hornets.
  - VFA-131 using Boeing F/A-18C Hornets.
  - VAW-123 using Northrop Grumman E-2 Hawkeyes.
  - VAQ-130 using Boeing EA-18G Growlers.
  - VRC-40 using Grumman C-2 Greyhounds.
  - HSC-7 using Sikorsky MH-60S Knighthawks.
  - HSM-74 using Sikorsky MH-60R Seahawks.
- USS John C. Stennis carrier strike group (October 15, 2018 – May 16, 2019)
  - Carrier Air Wing Nine (CVW-9)
    - VFA-41 using Boeing F/A-18F Super Hornets.
    - VFA-14 using Boeing F/A-18E Super Hornets.
    - VFA-97 using Boeing F/A-18E Super Hornets.
    - VFA-151 using Boeing F/A-18E Super Hornets.
    - VAQ-133 using Boeing EA-18G Growlers.
    - VAW-117 using Northrop Grumman E-2 Hawkeyes.
    - HSC-14 using Sikorsky MH-60S Knighthawks.
    - HSM-71 using Sikorsky MH-60R Seahawks.
- USS Abraham Lincoln carrier strike group (November 22, 2019 – present)
  - Carrier Air Wing Seven (CVW-7)
    - VFA-25 using Boeing F/A-18E Super Hornets.
    - VFA-86 using Boeing F/A-18E Super Hornets.
    - VFA-103 using Boeing F/A-18F Super Hornets.
    - VFA-143 using Boeing F/A-18F Super Hornets.
    - VAQ-140 using EA-18G Growler
    - VAW-121 using E-2D Advanced Hawkeye
    - HSC-5 using MH-60S Seahawk
    - HSM-79 using MH-60R Seahawk
    - VRC-40 Detachment 3 using C-2A Greyhound

=== Amphibious assault ships ===
==== United States ====
- USS Essex until October 2015.
- USS Kearsarge between December 2015 and June 2016.
  - Marine Medium Tiltrotor Squadron 162 (Reinforced) (VMM-162 REIN)
  - McDonnell Douglas AV-8B Harrier II - VMA-223
- USS Wasp between June and December 2016.
  - VMM-264 (VMM-264 REIN) using Bell AH-1W SuperCobra and McDonnell Douglas AV-8B Harrier IIs.
- USS Makin Island from 1 December 2016.
  - VMM-163 (VMM-163 REIN) with Bell Boeing MV-22 Osprey, McDonnell Douglas AV-8B Harrier II and Sikorsky CH-53E Super Stallions.
- USS Bataan until September 2017.
  - VMM-365 (VMM-365 REIN) with MV-22 Osprey's.
- USS Essex until February 2019.
  - Marine Fighter Attack Squadron 211 (VMFA-211) with Lockheed Martin F-35B Lightning II.

== Land bases ==
=== Aircraft at unknown land bases ===
Aircraft at unknown land bases
Boeing; C-17 Globemaster III	United States	816th Expeditionary Airlift Squadron, Det. 1.	Al Udeid Air Base		
Fairchild Republic; A-10 Thunderbolt II	United States	175th Wing = 104 EFS	Warfield Air National Guard Base	October 2016	
	United States	124th Fighter Wing = 190 EFS	Gowen Field	May 2020	
General Dynamics; F-16 Fighting Falcon	United States	388th Fighter Wing = 4 EFS	Hill Air Force Base	November 2014	
	United States	187th Fighter Wing = 100 EFS	Montgomery Air National Guard Base	October 2017	
	United States	180th Fighter Wing = 112 EFS	Toledo Air National Guard Base	October 2020	
Lockheed Martin; F-22 Raptor	United States	325th Fighter Wing = 95 EFS	Tyndall Air Force Base	October 2014	
Lockheed; P-3C Orion	United States	VP-46	Naval Air Station Whidbey Island		October 2017
McDonnell Douglas; F-15C Eagle	United States	48th Fighter Wing = 493rd Fighter Squadron (493 EFS)	RAF Lakenheath	May 2019	
McDonnell Douglas; F-15E Strike Eagle	United States	48th Fighter Wing = 492 EFS	RAF Lakenheath	April 2014	
	United States	4th Fighter Wing = 336 EFS	Seymour Johnson Air Force Base	October 2014	
	United States	48th Fighter Wing = 492 EFS	RAF Lakenheath	April 2017	October 2017
	United States	4th Fighter Wing = 336 EFS	Seymour Johnson Air Force Base	October 2017	April 2018
	United States	366th Fighter Wing = 391 EFS	Mountain Home Air Force Base	October 2018	April 2019
	United States	366th Fighter Wing = 389 EFS	Mountain Home Air Force Base	October 2019	
Northrop Grumman; EA-6B Prowler	United States	VMAQ-2	Marine Corps Air Station Cherry Point	2016	

=== Bahrain ===
==== Isa Air Base ====
Units based out of Isa Air Base are part of the 379th Air Expeditionary Wing (379 AEW).

Aircraft type	Country	Unit	Garrison	From	To	Notes
Boeing; P-8 Poseidon	United States		Naval Air Station Jacksonville; Naval Air Station Whidbey Island	2020	2020	
Lockheed; P-3C Orion	United States	Patrol Squadron 26 (VP-26)	Naval Air Station Jacksonville		September 2015	
	United States	Patrol Squadron 46 (VP-46)	Naval Air Station Whidbey Island	September 2015	March 2016	
	United States	Patrol Squadron 40 (VP-40)	Naval Air Station Whidbey Island	March 2016		
	United States	Patrol Squadron 46 (VP-46)	Naval Air Station Whidbey Island	March 2017	October 2017	
	United States	Patrol Squadron 46 (VP-46)	Naval Air Station Whidbey Island	November 2018	February 2019	
	United States	Patrol Squadron 40 (VP-40)	Naval Air Station Whidbey Island	February 2019	October 2019	
McDonnell Douglas; AV-8B Harrier II	United States	Marine Attack Squadron 211 (VMA-211)	Marine Corps Air Station Yuma		February 2015	
	United States	Marine Attack Squadron 223 attached to: Marine Medium Tiltrotor Squadron 162 (VMM-162 REIN)	Marine Corps Air Station Cherry Point	December 2015		
McDonnell Douglas; F/A-18C/D Hornet	United States	Marine Fighter Attack Squadron 232 (VMFA-232)	Marine Corps Air Station Miramar	February 2015	October 2015	

=== Iran ===
==== Hamadan Airbase (Nojeh) ====
Aircraft type	Country	Unit	Garrison	From	To	Notes
Sukhoi; Su-34	Russia	6950th Aviation Base	Engels	15 August 2016	23 August 2016	
Tupolev; Tu-22M3	Russia	6950th Aviation Base	Engels	15 August 2016	23 August 2016	

=== Iraq ===
==== Al Asad Airbase ====
(1st Expeditionary Rescue Group)

Aircraft type	Country	Unit	Garrison	From	To	Notes
Boeing; AH-64D Apache	United States	2nd Squadron, 17th Cavalry Regiment	Fort Campbell		2017	
General Atomics; MQ-1B Predator	United States		Unknown			
General Atomics; MQ-1C Gray Eagle	United States	D Company, 10th Aviation Regiment	Wheeler-Sack Army Airfield	August 2017	2017	
	United States	D Company, 10th Aviation Regiment	Wheeler-Sack Army Airfield	February 2019	October 2019	
	United States	D Company, 82nd Aviation Regiment	Simmons Army Airfield	October 2019	2020	
Sikorsky; HH-60 Pave Hawk	United States	56th Rescue Squadron	Aviano Air Base	October 2019	Present	

==== Baghdad ====
Aircraft type	Country	Unit	Garrison	From	To	Notes
Boeing; AH-64D Apache	United States	U.S. Army		July 2014		
Boeing; MH-47G Chinook	United States	160th Special Operations Aviation Regiment (Airborne) (160th SOAR)	Fort Campbell			
General Atomics; MQ-1C Gray Eagle	United States	Unknown				
Sikorsky; MH-60M Black Hawk	United States	160th Special Operations Aviation Regiment (Airborne) (160th SOAR)	Fort Campbell			

==== Al-Harir Air Base ====
Aircraft type	Country	Unit	Garrison	From	To	Notes
General Atomics; MQ-1C Gray Eagle	United States	United States Army				
Pilatus; U-28A	United States	USAF Special Operations Squadron				

==== Logistical Support Area Roberts (Erbil) ====
Aircraft type	Country	Unit	Garrison	From	To	Notes
Bell; CH-146 Griffon	Canada	427 Special Operations Aviation Squadron	CFB Petawawa	May 2016	October 2016	
	Canada	430 Tactical Helicopter Squadron	CFB Valcartier	October 2016		
Agusta; AH-129D Mangusta	Italy	5th Army Aviation Regiment	Francesco Baracca Airport	March 2016		
	Italy	7th Army Aviation Regiment	Francesco Baracca Airport	March 2016		
NHIndustries; UH-90A	Italy	5th Army Aviation Regiment	Francesco Baracca Airport	March 2016		
	Italy	7th Army Aviation Regiment	Francesco Baracca Airport	March 2016		
Bell Boeing; CV-22B Osprey	United States	United States Air Force				
Boeing; AH-64E Apache	United States	1st Battalion, 10th Aviation Regiment	Fort Drum	2016	2016	
	United States	Bravo Troop, 4th Squadron, 6th Cavalry	Fort Lewis	2016	2017	
	United States	1st Battalion, 1st Aviation Regiment	Fort Riley	2019	2019	
Boeing; CH-47F Chinook	United States	United States Army				
Boeing; MH-47G Chinook	United States	160th SOAR	Fort Campbell			
Sikorsky; MH-60M Black Hawk	United States	160th Special Operations Aviation Regiment (Airborne)	Fort Campbell			
Sikorsky; UH-60A/M Black Hawk	United States	Medevac Company F, 2nd Battalion, 238th Aviation Regiment	Robinson Maneuver Training Center	May 2016	June 2016	
	United States	Company A, 1st Attack Reconnaissance Battalion, 10th Aviation Regiment	Fort Drum	May 2016	2016	
	United States	Company A, 2nd Assault Battalion, 224th Aviation Regiment	Richmond International Airport	2016	2017	
Sikorsky; HH-60M Black Hawk	United States	Company C, 1st General Support Aviation Battalion, 111th Aviation Regiment		June 2016		

==== Qayyarah Airfield West ====
The 821st Contingency Response Group was based at Qayyarah from mid-October 2016 until March 2017 when the 370th Air Expeditionary Advisory Group arrived.

==== Camp Taji ====
Units have been based at Camp Taji since May 2016.

Aircraft type	Country	Unit	Garrison	From	To	Notes
Boeing; AH-64D/E Apache	United States	4th Battalion, 501st Aviation Regiment	Fort Bliss		August 2015	
	United States	3rd Squadron, 6th Cavalry Regiment	Fort Bliss	August 2015	April 2016	
	United States	1st Battalion (Attack Reconnaissance), 10th Aviation Regiment	Fort Drum	April 2016		
	United States	4th Squadron, 6th Cavalry Regiment	Joint Base Lewis–McChord	2017		
	United States	1st Battalion (Attack Reconnaissance), 1st Aviation Regiment	Fort Riley	June 2019	2019	
	United States	1st Battalion (Attack Reconnaissance), 227th Aviation Regiment		2019	2020	
Boeing; CH-47F Chinook	United States	1st Battalion (General Support), 126th Aviation Regiment	Stockton Metropolitan Airport		August 2018	
	United States	2nd Battalion (General Support), 211th Aviation Regiment	Davenport Municipal Airport	August 2018		
	United States	5th Battalion (General Support), 159th Aviation Regiment		2019		Task Force Dragonmasters
MD Helicopters; MH-6 Little Bird	United States	United States Army				
Sikorsky; HH-60 Black Hawk	United States	5th Battalion (General Support), 159th Aviation Regiment		2019		
Sikorsky; UH-60A/L/M Black Hawk	United States	5th Battalion (General Support), 159th Aviation Regiment		2019		

=== Italy ===
==== Naval Air Station Sigonella ====
Aircraft type	Country	Unit	Garrison	From	To	Notes
Boeing; P-8A Poseidon	United States	VP-16	NAS Jacksonville	March 2017	October 2017	
Boeing; P-8A Poseidon	United States	VP-5	NAS Jacksonville	October 2017		

=== Jordan ===
==== Muwaffaq Salti Air Base ====
Also known as Al Azraq - 332 AEW/407th Air Expeditionary Group

Aircraft type	Country	Unit	Garrison	From	To	Notes
Airbus; A330 MRTT	United Arab Emirates	United Arab Emirates Air Force = Central Air Command		February 2015	Unknown	
Airbus; A310-304 MRTT	Germany	1. Lufttransportstaffel; (1st Air Transport Squadron)	Cologne Bonn Airport	July 2017	September 2019	
Airbus A400M (AAR)	Germany	Lufttransportgeschwader 62	Wunstorf Air Base	September 2019		
Boeing; C-17ER Globemaster III	United Arab Emirates	United Arab Emirates Air Force		February 2015	Unknown	
Dassault; Mirage 2000D	France	Elements of Escadron de Chasse 3/3 Ardennes	Nancy – Ochey Air Base	November 2014	August 2016	
	France	Elements of Escadron de Chasse 2/3 Champagne	Nancy – Ochey Air Base	November 2014	August 2016	
	France	Elements of Escadron de Chasse 1/3 Navarre	Nancy – Ochey Air Base	November 2014	August 2016	
Dassault; Mirage 2000N	France	French Air Force		July 2014	Before 2018	
Dassault; Rafale B	France	Escadron de Chasse 2/4 La Fayette	Istres-Le Tubé Air Base	August 2016		
	France	Escadron de Chasse 2/30 Normandie-Niemen	Mont-de-Marsan Air Base	August 2016		
	France	Escadron de Chasse 1/4 Gascogne			2018	
General Dynamics; F-16A Fighting Falcon	Bahrain	1st Fighter Squadron (RBAF)	Isa Air Base	February 2015		
	Bahrain	2nd Fighter Squadron (RBAF)	Isa Air Base	February 2015		
General Atomics; MQ-1B Predator	United States					
General Atomics; MQ-9 Reaper	United States					
General Dynamics; F-16C Fighting Falcon	United States	20th Fighter Wing= 77 EFS	Shaw Air Force Base	February 2015		
	United States	20th Fighter Wing = 55 EFS	Shaw Air Force Base			
	United States	35th Fighter Wing = 13 EFS	Misawa Air Base			
	United States	35th Fighter Wing = 14 EFS	Misawa Air Base			
	United States	52d Fighter Wing = 480 EFS	Spangdahlem Air Base	April 2016	October 2016	
	United States	158th Fighter Wing = 134 EFS	Burlington Air National Guard Base	December 2016	April 2017	
	United States	148th Fighter Wing = 179 EFS	Duluth Air National Guard Base	April 2018	July 2018	
	United States	169th Fighter Wing = 157 EFS	McEntire Joint National Guard Base	July 2018	October 2018	
	United States	20th Fighter Wing = 55 EFS	Shaw Air Force Base	October 2018		
Lockheed Martin; F-16AM Fighting Falcon	Belgium	Elements of the 2nd Tactical Wing	Florennes Air Base	October 2014	June 2015	
	Belgium	Elements of the 10th Tactical Wing	Kleine Brogel Air Base	28 June 2016	2017?	
	Belgium	Elements of the 2nd Tactical Wing	Florennes Air Base	October 2020	October 2021	
Lockheed Martin; F-16AM Fighting Falcon	Netherlands	Royal Netherlands Air Force		October 2014	28 June 2016	
	Netherlands	312 or 313 Squadron, Royal Netherlands Air Force	Volkel Air Base	3 January 2017	January 2019	
Lockheed Martin; F-16E/F Desert Falcon	United Arab Emirates	Western Air Command = Fighter Wing		February 2015		
Lockheed Martin; F-35 Lightning II	United States	388th Fighter Wing	Hill Air Force Base	2020	2020	
McDonnell Douglas; F-15E Strike Eagle	United States	4th Fighter Wing = 335 EFS	Seymour Johnson Air Force Base	October 2019	2020	
	United States	366th Fighter Wing = 389 EFS	Mountain Home Air Force Base	2020	May 2020	
	United States	48th Fighter Wing = 492 EFS	RAF Lakenheath	May 2020	October 2020	
	United States	366th Fighter Wing = 391 EFS	Mountain Home Air Force Base	October 2020		
Panavia; Tornado IDS/ECR	Germany	Tactical Air Force Wing 51 "Immelmann"	Schleswig Air Base	October 2017	March 2020	
	Germany	Tactical Air Force Wing 33	Büchel Air Base	2016	March 2020	

==== Prince Hassan Air Base ====
Aircraft type	Country	Unit	Garrison	From	To	Notes
Breguet; Atlantique 2	France	Flottille 21F Flottille 23F	Lann Bihoue	2014		
Dassault; Rafale B	France	French Air Force		August 2019	November 2019	
Dassault; Rafale C	France	30e Escadre de Chasse	Mont-de-Marsan Air Base	November 2019		
Transall; C-160	France	61e Escadre de Transport 64e Escadre de Transport	Orléans – Bricy Air Base Évreux-Fauville Air Base	2014		

=== Kuwait ===
==== Al Mubarak Air Base ====
Aircraft type	Country	Unit	Garrison	From	To	Notes
Airbus; CC-150T Polaris	Canada	437 Transport Squadron	CFB Trenton	October 2014	January 2019	
Boeing; KC-767A	Italy	8th Squadron	Pratica di Mare Air Base	October 2014		Initially at Ahmad al-Jaber Air Base.

==== Ahmad al-Jaber Air Base ====
(386 AEW/332 AEW/407th Air Expeditionary Group)

Aircraft type	Country	Unit	Garrison	From	To	Notes
Alenia; EC-27J Jedi	Italy	98th Squadron	Pisa Air Base	August 2016		
AMX International; AMX A-11B	Italy	132nd Ground Attack Reconnaissance Squadron	Istrana Air Base	14 June 2016		
Eurofighter; Typhoon	Italy	Structure of the Italian Air Force		2020	2020	
Fairchild Republic; A-10C Thunderbolt II	United States	122d Fighter Wing = 163 EFS	Fort Wayne Air National Guard Station	17 November 2014	April 2015	
	United States	127th Wing = 107 EFS	Selfridge Air National Guard Base	April 2015	October 2015	
McDonnell Douglas; CF-18A Hornet	Canada	409 Tactical Fighter Squadron	CFB Cold Lake	October 2014	February 2016	
McDonnell Douglas; F-15E Strike Eagle	United States	4th Fighter Wing = 336 EFS	Seymour Johnson Air Force Base		March 2018	
	United States	48th Fighter Wing = 494 EFS	RAF Lakenheath	February 2018	October 2018	
General Dynamics; F-16AM Fighting Falcon	Denmark	Eskadrille 727 (RDAF)	Fighter Wing Skrydstrup	15 October 2014	30 September 2015	
	Denmark	Eskadrille 730 (RDAF)	Fighter Wing Skrydstrup	October 2014	30 September 2015	
General Dynamics; F-16C/D Fighting Falcon	United States	134th Fighter Squadron	Burlington Air National Guard Base	December 2016		
	Poland	10th Tactical Squadron	Łask Air Base	July 2016		
	Poland	6th Tactical Squadron	31st Tactical Air Base	July 2016		
Panavia; Tornado	Italy	154th Fighter-Bomber Reconnaissance & SEAD Squadron	Ghedi Air Base	22 November 2014	14 June 2016	
	Italy	Elements of 50º Stormo Giorgio Graffer (50th Wing)		22 November 2014	14 June 2016	

==== Ali Al Salem Air Base ====
(386 AEW)

Aircraft type	Country	Unit	Garrison	From	To	Notes
Boeing; C-17A Globemaster III	United States	315th Airlift Wing	Joint Base Charleston			
	United States	60th Air Mobility Wing = 21 EAS	Travis Air Force Base			
General Atomics; MQ-1B Predator	United States	U.S. Air Force		2014		
General Atomics; MQ-1C Gray Eagle	United States	U.S. Army		2014		
General Atomics; MQ-9A Reaper	United Kingdom	No. 13 Squadron RAF (Pooled asset)	Creech Air Force Base			
	United Kingdom	No. 39 Squadron RAF (Pooled asset)	Creech Air Force Base			
	United States			2014		
Lockheed; AC-130U Spooky	United States	4th Special Operations Squadron	Hurlburt Field		August 2016	
Lockheed; EC-130H Compass Call	United States	41st Electronic Combat Squadron	Davis–Monthan Air Force Base		February 2017	
	United States	43rd Electronic Combat Squadron	Davis–Monthan Air Force Base		October 2019	
Lockheed; EC-130J Commando Solo III	United States	193d Special Operations Squadron	Harrisburg Air National Guard Base			
Lockheed; MC-130H Combat Talon II	United States	U.S. Air Force				
Lockheed; C-130H Hercules	United States	737th Expeditionary Airlift Squadron; 779th Expeditionary Airlift Squadron	Ali Al Salem Air Base			
Lockheed Martin; C-130J Super Hercules	United States	737th Expeditionary Airlift Squadron; 779th Expeditionary Airlift Squadron	Ali Al Salem Air Base			
Lockheed; CP-140M Aurora	Canada	Canadian Air Force	CFB Greenwood			

=== Qatar ===
==== Al Udeid Air Base ====
(379th Air Expeditionary Wing & No. 83 EAG RAF)

Aircraft type	Country	Unit	Garrison	From	To	Notes
Airbus; A330 Phénix	France	Escadron de Ravitaillement en Vol et de Transport 1/31 Bretagne	BA 125 Istres-Le Tubé Air Base	October 2020	November 2020	
Boeing; B-52H Stratofortress (Pooled asset)	United States	2d Bomb Wing = 96th Expeditionary Bomb Squadron (EBS)	Barksdale Air Force Base		April 2018	
	United States	2d Bomb Wing = 11 EBS	Barksdale Air Force Base	10 September 2016	April 2018	
	United States	2d Bomb Wing = 20 EBS	Barksdale Air Force Base	11 April 2016	April 2018	
	United States	2d Bomb Wing = 96 EBS	Barksdale Air Force Base	11 April 2016	April 2018	
	United States	5th Bomb Wing = 69 EBS	Minot Air Force Base	September 2017	April 2018	
	United States	2d Bomb Wing = 20 EBS	Barksdale Air Force Base	9 May 2019		
Boeing; C-17A Globemaster III	United States	816 EAS				
Boeing; EA-18G Growler	United States	Electronic Attack Squadron 135 (VAQ-135)	Naval Air Station Whidbey Island	October 2018		
Boeing; E-3F Sentry	France	Escadron de détection et de contrôle aéroportés 36 Berry	BA 702 Avord Air Base	October 2014		
Boeing; KC-135R Stratotanker	United States	340th Expeditionary Air Refueling Squadron	Al Udeid Air Base			
Boeing; RC-135V Rivet Joint	United States	763d Expeditionary Reconnaissance Squadron (ERS)	Al Udeid Air Base	1990		
Boeing; RC-135W Airseeker	United Kingdom	No. 51 Squadron RAF	RAF Waddington	July 2014	December 2014	
Fairchild Republic; A-10 Thunderbolt II	United States	23rd Wing = 74 EFS	Moody Air Force Base	January 2020	June 2020	
General Dynamics; F-16C/D Fighting Falcon	United States	31st Fighter Wing = 555 EFS	Aviano Air Base	November 2019		
Learjet; C-21A	United States	746th Expeditionary Airlift Squadron (746 EAS)	Al Udeid Air Base			
Lockheed; C-130H Hercules	United States	746 EAS	Al Udeid Air Base	May 2016		
Lockheed Martin; C-130J Super Hercules	United States	746 EAS	Al Udeid Air Base			
Lockheed; EP-3E Aries II	United States	Fleet Air Reconnaissance Squadron 1 (VQ-1)	Naval Air Station Whidbey Island			
Lockheed; F-22A Raptor	United States	1st Fighter Wing	Joint Base Langley–Eustis	June 2019		
	United States	192nd Fighter Wing	Joint Base Langley–Eustis	June 2019		
Lockheed; P-3C Orion	United States					
McDonnell Douglas; AV-8B Harrier II	United States	Marine Medium Tiltrotor Squadron 161 (REIN)	Marine Corps Air Station Miramar	November 2017		
McDonnell Douglas; F-15E Strike Eagle	United States	48th Fighter Wing	RAF Lakenheath	2014	2014	
	United States	366th Fighter Wing	Mountain Home Air Force Base	2014	2014	
	United States	4th Fighter Wing	Seymour Johnson Air Force Base	2016	2016	
Northrop Grumman; E-8 Joint Stars	United States	7th Expeditionary Airborne Command and Control Squadron	Al Udeid Air Base	2008	2019	
	United States	128th Airborne Command and Control Squadron	Robins Air Force Base	2002	2019	
	United States	461st Air Control Wing	Robins Air Force Base	2011	2019	
	United States	138th Military Intelligence Company	Robins Air Force Base	2001	2019	
Northrop Grumman; EA-6B Prowler	United States	Marine Tactical Electronic Warfare Squadron 3 (VMAQ-3)	Marine Corps Air Station Cherry Point	February 2014	August 2014	
	United States	VMAQ-2	Marine Corps Air Station Cherry Point		October 2018	
Rockwell; B-1B Lancer	United States	28th Bomb Wing = 34 EBS	Ellsworth Air Force Base	July 2015	January 2016	
	United States	28th Bomb Wing = 34 EBS	Ellsworth Air Force Base	April 2018		
	United States	7th Bomb Wing = 9 EBS	Dyess Air Force Base	2018	11 March 2019	

=== Russia ===
==== Mozdok air base ====
Aircraft type	Country	Unit	Garrison	From	To	Notes
Tupolev; Tu-22M	Russia	Russian Air Force	Mozdok	17 November 2015	N/A	Home base.

=== Syria ===
==== Khmeimim airbase ====
(Latakia Air Base) (Special Purpose Aviation Brigade)

Aircraft type	Country	Unit	Garrison	From	To	Notes
Antonov; An-26 (NATO: Curl)	Russia	Russian Air Force				
Antonov; An-30 (NATO: Clank)	Russia	Russian Air Force				
Antonov; An-72 (NATO: Coaler)	Russia	Russian Air Force				
Beriev; A-50 (NATO: Mainstay)	Russia	144th Airborne Early Warning Aviation Regiment	Ivanovo Severny			
Ilyushin; Il-20M (NATO: Coot-A)	Russia	Russian Air Force				
Ilyushin; Il-38N (NATO: May)	Russia	Russian Naval Aviation				
Ilyushin; Il-76 (NATO: Candid)	Russia	Russian Air Force				
Sukhoi; Su-24M (NATO: Fencer)	Russia	Russian Air Force		September 2015		
Sukhoi; Su-25SM3 (NATO: Frogfoot)	Russia	Russian Air Force		September 2015		
Sukhoi; Su-25UB (NATO: Frogfoot)	Russia	Russian Air Force		September 2015	May 2016	
Sukhoi; Su-27SM3 (NATO: Flanker-E)	Russia	Russian Air Force		July 2017		
Sukhoi; Su-30SM (NATO: Flanker-H)	Russia	Russian Air Force		September 2015		
Sukhoi; Su-34 (NATO: Fullback)	Russia	Russian Air Force		September 2015		
	Russia	929th State Flight Test Centre named for V. P. Chkalov	Akhtubinsk	November 2015		
Sukhoi; Su-35S (NATO: Flanker-E)	Russia	Russian Air Force		January 2016		
	Russia	185th Centre for Combat Application and Combat Training for the Air Force; 116th Fighter Aviation Combat Employment Centre	Astrakhan	January 2016		
Mikoyan; MiG-29SMT (NATO: Fulcrum)	Russia	Russian Air Force		September 2017		
Mil; Mi-8AMTSh-V (NATO: Hip)	Russia	337th Independent Helicopter Regiment	Tolmachevo Airport	September 2015		
	Russia	Russian Air Force			September 2022	
Mil; Mi-24P (NATO: Hind-F)	Russia	337th Independent Helicopter Regiment	Tolmachevo Airport	September 2015		
	Russia	Russian Air Force			September 2022	
Mil; Mi-28N (NATO: Havoc)	Russia	16th Army Aviation Brigade	Zernograd Airport	March 2016		
	Russia	487th Independent Helicopter Regiment	Stavropol Shpakovskoye Airport			
	Russia	55th Independent Helicopter Regiment	Korenovsk Airport			
Mil; Mi-35M (NATO: Hind-E)	Russia	55th Independent Helicopter Regiment	Korenovsk Airport	December 2015		
	Russia	16th Army Aviation Brigade	Zernograd			
Kamov; Ka-27 (NATO: Helix)	Russia	Russian Naval Aviation				
Kamov; Ka-52 (NATO: Hokum-B)	Russia	55th Independent Helicopter Regiment	Korenovsk Airport	March 2016	Unknown	

==== Shayrat Air Base/Shariat ====
Aircraft type	Country	Unit	Garrison	From	To	Notes
	Russia	Russian Air Force				

==== Tias ====
Aircraft type	Country	Unit	Garrison	From	To	Notes
Mil; Mi-24P	Russia	337th Independent Helicopter Regiment	Tolmachevo Airport			

=== Turkey ===
==== Diyarbakir Air Base ====
(39th Air Base Wing)

Aircraft type	Country	Unit	Garrison	From	To	Notes
Lockeed; HC-130J Combat King II	United States	1st Expeditionary Rescue Group	Diyarbakir Air Base	October 2015	July 2018	
Sikorsky; HH-60G Pave Hawk	United States	1st Expeditionary Rescue Group	Diyarbakir Air Base	October 2015	July 2018	

==== Incirlik Air Base ====
(39th Air Base Wing/332 AEW/447th Air Expeditionary Group)

Aircraft type	Country	Unit	Garrison	From	To	Notes
Airbus; A310-304 MRTT	Germany	1st Air Transport Squadron	Köln-Wahn Airport	December 2015	July 2017	
Boeing; KC-135R Stratotanker	United States	22nd Expeditionary Air Refueling Squadron	Incirlik Air Base			
Fairchild Republic; A-10C Thunderbolt II	United States	23d Fighter Group = 74 EFS	Moody Air Force Base	October 2015	March 2016	
	United States	124th Fighter Wing = 190 EFS	Gowen Field Air National Guard Base	March 2016	October 2016	
	United States	355th Fighter Wing = 354 EFS	Davis–Monthan Air Force Base	October 2016	July 2017	
	United States	23d Fighter Group = 74 EFS	Moody Air Force Base	July 2017	January 2018	
General Dynamics; F-16AM/BM Fighting Falcon	Denmark	Eskadrille 727		15 June 2016		
	Denmark	Eskadrille 730		15 June 2016		
General Dynamics; F-16C Fighting Falcon	United States	31st Fighter Wing = 510 EFS	Aviano Air Base	August 2015	October 2015	
McDonnell Douglas; F-15C Eagle	United States	48th Fighter Wing = 493 EFS	RAF Lakenheath	November 2015	December 2015	
McDonnell Douglas; F-15E Strike Eagle	United States	48th Fighter Wing = 492 EFS	RAF Lakenheath	November 2015	December 2015	
McDonnell Douglas; F-15S Strike Eagle	Saudi Arabia	No. 3 Wing RSAF = No. 92 Squadron RSAF	King Abdulaziz Air Base	February 2016		
Northrop Grumman; EA-6B Prowler	United States	Marine Tactical Electronic Warfare Squadron 4 (VMAQ-4)	Marine Corps Air Station Cherry Point	April 2016	October 2016	
	United States	VMAQ-2	Marine Corps Air Station Cherry Point	October 2016		
Panavia; Tornado IDS/ECR	Germany	German Air Force		January 2016	July 2017	

==== Forward Operating Base Konya ====
Aircraft type	Country	Unit	Garrison	From	To	Notes
Boeing; E-3 Sentry	NATO	NATO E-3A Component	NATO Air Base Geilenkirchen	October 2016		

=== United Arab Emirates ===
==== Al Dhafra Air Base ====
(380 AEW)

Aircraft type	Country	Unit	Garrison	From	To	Notes
Boeing; C-135FR Stratotanker	France	Escadron de Ravitaillement en Vol 4/31 Sologne		September 2014		
Dassault; Rafale	France	Escadron de Chasse 3/30 Lorraine	Mont-de-Marsan Air Base	September 2014		
Dassault; Atlantique 2	France	Flottille 21F (FNA)	Lann Bihoue	September 2014	Before 2019	
	France	Flottille 23F FNA	Lann Bihoue	September 2014	Before 2019	
Fairchild Republic; A-10C Thunderbolt II	United States	23rd Wing	Moody Air Force Base	January 2020		
	United States	23rd Wing = 75 EFS	Moody Air Force Base	March 2023		
General Dynamics; F-16 Fighting Falcon	Morocco	Royal Moroccan Air Force		2014		
Lockheed; U-2S Dragon Lady	United States	99 ERS	Beale Air Force Base			
Lockheed Martin; F-22A Raptor	United States	1st Fighter Wing = 27 EFS	Joint Base Langley–Eustis	April 2014	October 2014	
	United States	325th Fighter Wing	Tyndall Air Force Base	October 2014	April 2015	
	United States	1st Fighter Wing = 94 EFS	Joint Base Langley–Eustis	April 2015	October 2015	
	United States	192d Fighter Wing = 149 EFS	Joint Base Langley–Eustis	April 2015	October 2015	
	United States	15th Wing = 19 EFS	Joint Base Pearl Harbor–Hickam	October 2015	April 2016	
	United States	3d Wing = 90 EFS	Joint Base Elmendorf–Richardson	April 2016		
	United States	1st Fighter Wing = 94 EFS	Joint Base Langley–Eustis	April 2018	October 2018	
Lockheed Martin; F-35A Lightning II	United States	388th Fighter Wing = 4 EFS	Hill Air Force Base	April 2019	October 2019	
	United States	419th Fighter Wing = 466 EFS	Hill Air Force Base	April 2019	October 2019	
	United States	388th Fighter Wing = 34 EFS	Hill Air Force Base	October 2019	April 2020	
	United States	388th Fighter Wing = 421 EFS	Hill Air Force Base	April 2020	October 2020	
McDonnell Douglas; F-15E Strike Eagle	United States	48th Fighter Wing = 494 EFS	RAF Lakenheath	May 2015	October 2015	
	United States	366th Fighter Wing = 391 EFS	Mountain Home Air Force Base	October 2015	April 2016	
	United States	4th Fighter Wing = 335 EFS	Seymour Johnson Air Force Base	April 2016	October 2016	
	United States	366th Fighter Wing = 389 EFS	Mountain Home Air Force Base	October 2016	April 2017	
	United States	4th Fighter Wing	Seymour Johnson Air Force Base	2019		
	United States	48th Fighter Wing = 494 EFS	RAF Lakenheath	October 2019	January 2020	
McDonnell Douglas; KC-10 Extender	United States	908 EARS	Al Dhafra Air Base			
Northrop Grumman; RQ-4 Global Hawk	United States					

==== Al Minhad Air Base ====
Aircraft type	Country	Unit	Garrison	From	To	Notes
Airbus; KC-30A	Australia	No. 33 Squadron RAAF	RAAF Base Amberley	October 2014		
Boeing; E-7A Wedgetail	Australia	No. 2 Squadron RAAF	RAAF Base Williamtown	October 2014		
Boeing; F/A-18F Super Hornet	Australia	No. 1 Squadron RAAF	RAAF Base Amberley	September 2014	March 2015	
	Australia	No. 6 Squadron RAAF	RAAF Base Amberley	September 2014		
McDonnell Douglas; F/A-18A Hornet	Australia	No. 75 Squadron RAAF	RAAF Base Tindal	January 2015		

=== Akrotiri and Dhekelia (UK) ===
==== RAF Akrotiri ====
Aircraft type	Country	Unit	Garrison	From	To	Notes
Airbus; Atlas C.1	United Kingdom	No. 70 Squadron RAF	RAF Brize Norton			
Airbus; Voyager KC.2/KC.3	United Kingdom	No. 10 Squadron RAF	RAF Brize Norton			
	United Kingdom	No. 101 Squadron RAF	RAF Brize Norton			
Boeing; C-17A Globemaster III	United Kingdom	No. 99 Squadron RAF	RAF Brize Norton	August 2014		
Boeing; Chinook HC.4	United Kingdom	No. 7 Squadron RAF	RAF Odiham	2014	2014	
	United Kingdom	No. 18 Squadron RAF	RAF Odiham	2014	2014	
	United Kingdom	No. 27 Squadron RAF	RAF Odiham	2014	2014	
Boeing; Sentry AEW.1	United Kingdom	No. 8 Squadron RAF	RAF Waddington			
Beechcraft; Shadow R.1	United Kingdom	No. 14 Squadron RAF	RAF Waddington			
Eurofighter; Typhoon FGR.4 (Pooled asset)	United Kingdom	No. 1 Squadron RAF	RAF Lossiemouth	December 2015	February 2016	
	United Kingdom	No. 2 Squadron RAF	RAF Lossiemouth	December 2015	January 2016	
	United Kingdom	No. 6 Squadron RAF	RAF Lossiemouth	December 2015	March 2016	
	United Kingdom	No. 1 Squadron RAF	RAF Lossiemouth	February 2017	Unknown	
	United Kingdom	No. 2 Squadron RAF	RAF Lossiemouth	September 2017	Unknown	
	United Kingdom	No. 6 Squadron RAF	RAF Lossiemouth	2018		
	United Kingdom	No. 3 Squadron RAF	RAF Coningsby	September 2019	Unknown	
	United Kingdom	No. 11 Squadron RAF	RAF Coningsby	September 2019	Unknown	
Panavia; Tornado GR.4 (Pooled asset)	United Kingdom	No. 2 Squadron RAF	RAF Marham	August 2014	2015	
	United Kingdom	No. 9 Squadron RAF	RAF Marham	August 2014	January 2019	
	United Kingdom	No. 12 Squadron RAF	RAF Marham	January 2015	January 2019	
	United Kingdom	No. 31 Squadron RAF	RAF Marham	August 2014	January 2019	
Lockheed Martin; F-35 Lightning II	United Kingdom	No. 617 Squadron RAF	RAF Marham	June 2019		
Lockheed; Hercules C.5 (Pooled asset)	United Kingdom	No. 30 Squadron RAF	RAF Brize Norton	August 2014		
	United Kingdom	No. 47 Squadron RAF	RAF Brize Norton	August 2014		
Raytheon; Sentinel R.1	United Kingdom	No. 5 Squadron RAF	RAF Waddington	2015 2018	August 2017 Current	

== See also ==
- Operation Inherent Resolve, name for American operations
- Operation Okra, name for Australian operations
- Operation Shader, name for British operations
- Operation Impact, name for Canadian operations
- Opération Chammal, name for French operations
- Operation Counter Daesh, name for German operations

Commander headquarters of ongoing operations:

- Combined Joint Task Force – Operation Inherent Resolve
