= RBAF =

RBAF may refer to:

- Royal Brunei Air Force
- Royal Brunei Armed Forces
- Royal Bahraini Air Force
