= Gulf Air =

National airline of Bahrain

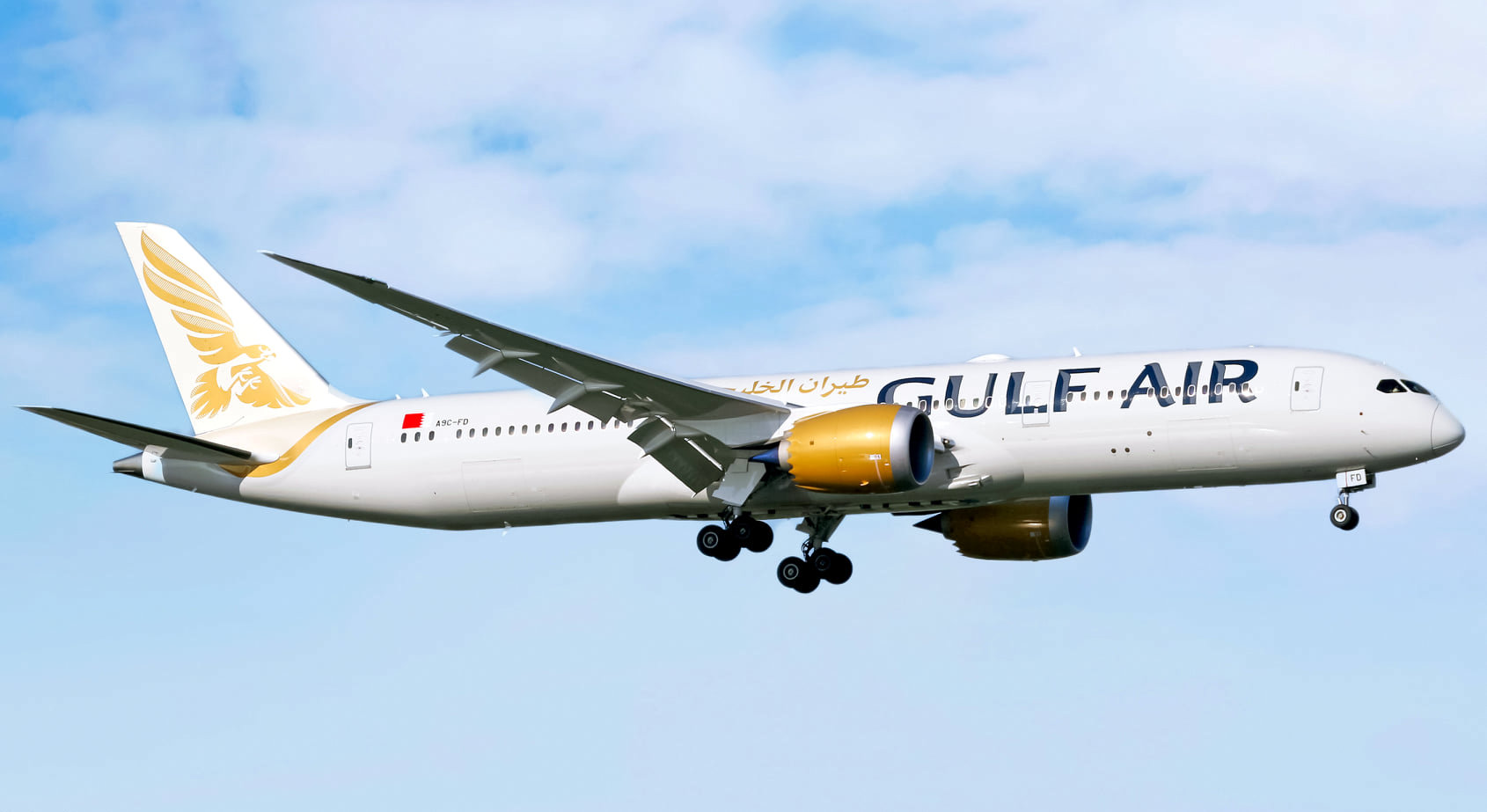
- Gulf Air Boeing 787-9
IATA	ICAO	Call sign
GF	GFA	GULF AIR
- Founded: 10 January 1974
- Hubs: Bahrain International Airport
- Frequent-flyer program: Falconflyer
- Fleet size: 46
- Destinations: 65
- Parent company: Gulf Air Holding B.S.C
- Headquarters: Muharraq, Bahrain
- Key people: Khalid Hussain Taqi (Chairman); Martin Gauss (Group CEO)
- Website: www.gulfair.com

Gulf Air (Arabic: طيران الخليج, romanized: Ṭayarān al-Khalīj) is the flag carrier of Bahrain, which was founded in on 1 January 1974. Headquartered in Muharraq, the airline operates scheduled flights to 65 destinations in 38 countries across Africa, Asia, and Europe. The airline's main hub is at Bahrain International Airport, Bahrain's sole international airport.

Gulf Air currently serves all its destinations with a mixed fleet consisting of narrow-body Airbus A320, Airbus A321, Airbus A320neo and Airbus A321neo aircraft, as well as wide-body Boeing 787-9 aircraft. Gulf Air is the sponsor of the Bahrain Grand Prix and Bahrain International Airshow. Dubai–International is the busiest route served by the airline, with over 95 flights a week back and forth.

== History ==
=== 1949–1973: Gulf Aviation ===
In the late 1940s, Freddie Bosworth, a British pilot and entrepreneur, began an air taxi service to Doha and Dhahran from Bahrain, registering the Gulf Aviation Company Limited on 24 March 1950. In October 1951, British Overseas Airways Corporation (BOAC) became a major shareholder in Gulf Aviation, holding a 22% stake. By the early 1970s, Gulf Aviation's fleet included three Fokker F27 and two BAC One-Eleven aircraft, serving destinations such as Bahrain, Doha, Abu Dhabi, Dubai and Kuwait. Its timetable also included twice-weekly flights to London, although these were operated by BOAC Vickers VC10.

=== 1974: Gulf Air established ===
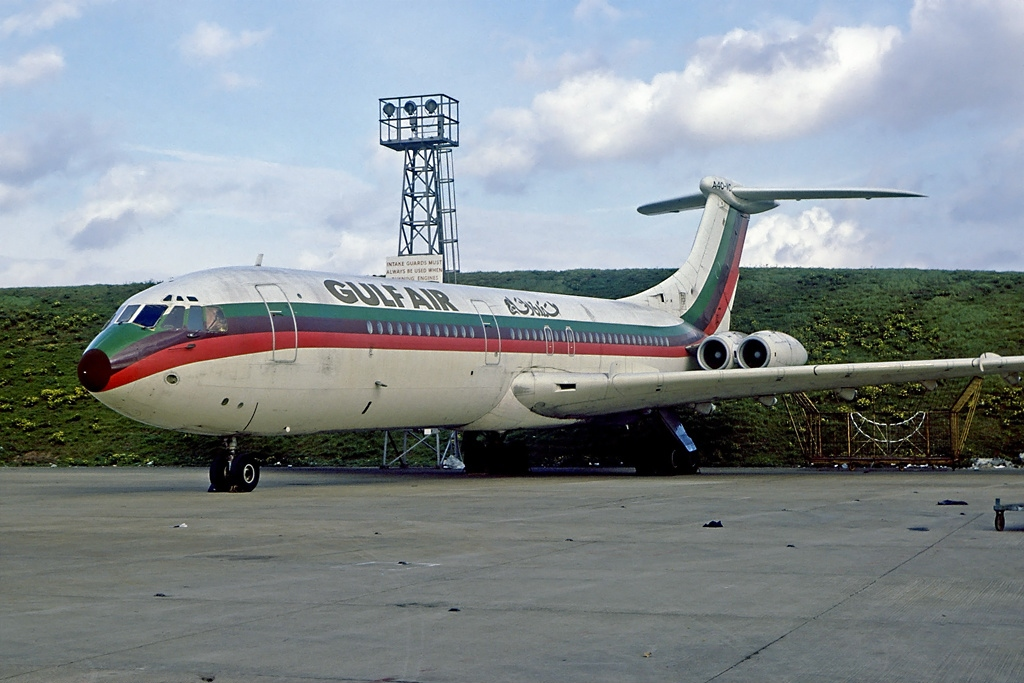
Gulf Air Vickers VC10 in original livery (1977)

In 1973, the governments of the Emirate (now Kingdom) of Bahrain, the State of Qatar, the Emirate of Abu Dhabi and the Sultanate of Oman agreed to purchase the BOAC holding in Gulf Aviation. The Foundation Treaty was signed on 1 January 1974 and gave each government a 25% shareholding in Gulf Aviation, which became a holding company. The operating company was now branded as Gulf Air and became the flag carrier for the four states. Gulf Air inherited a variety of aircraft from Gulf Aviation, repainting them with new titles and colour scheme, and transferring them to the A4O- register. But most significantly, they gained five ex-BOAC Vickers VC10s, allowing them to commence a full schedule with flights on every day of the week to London, and also regular services new destinations such as Bombay, Karachi, Amman, Cairo, Beirut and Athens.

With Lockheed L-1011 and Boeing 737-200 aircraft joining the fleet, by 1976, Gulf Air had expanded its route network to include Amman, Amsterdam, Athens, Baghdad, Bombay, Bangkok, Beirut, Cairo, Colombo, Delhi, Dhaka, Hong Kong, Jeddah, Karachi, Khartoum, Larnaca, Manila, Paris, Ras al-Khaimah and Sanaa. As more Lockheed L-1011s and Boeing 737-200s arrived, the VC10s and BAC One-Elevens were phased out.

=== 1980s–1992: expansion ===
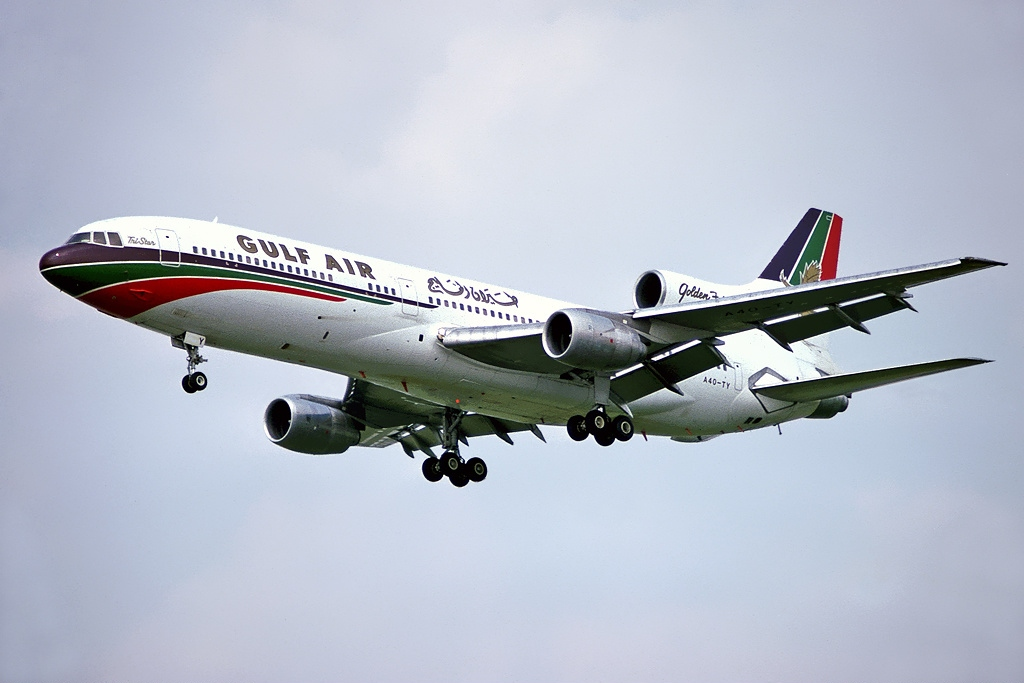
Gulf Air Lockheed L-1011 in revised livery (1978)

The 1980s saw an increase in air travel and growth for Gulf Air. In 1981, Gulf Air became an IATA member, and in the following year, it became the first international airline to land at Riyadh. In 1985, Emirates, the airline of the Emirate of Dubai, began operating. During their first year of operations, Gulf Air profits fell 30%, prompting the airline to drop its privatization plans. In 1986, Gulf Air posted a loss.

In 1988, Boeing 767s joined the fleet, and the airline commenced services to Frankfurt, Istanbul, Damascus, Dar es Salaam, Fujairah and Nairobi, and resumed services to Shiraz and Baghdad.

Whilst the VC10s were painted in the original Gulf Air livery (green/maroon brown/red stripes all along the fuselage and then sweeping up the tail), the arrival of the Lockheed L1011 TriStar in 1976 brought a new 'Golden Falcon' colour scheme featuring a predominantly white fuselage, with tri-coloured flashes on the nose, and a large golden falcon on the tail fin. This livery was used on the following types: Lockheed L1011-200 TriStar (1976), Boeing 737-200 (1977), Boeing 767-300ER (1988), Airbus A320-200 (1992), Airbus A340-300 (1994) and Airbus A330-200 (1999), but was also applied to at least some of the VC10s in their last few months of service.

Gulf Air celebrated its 40th anniversary in 1990. The light-blue and peach Balenciaga-designed uniform was introduced. Services to Singapore, Sydney and Thiruvananthapuram were launched, making Gulf Air the first Arab airline to fly to Australia. Gulf Air added services to Johannesburg and Melbourne in 1992, becoming the first Arab airline to fly directly to these cities. In 1993, it opened a flight-simulator centre in Qatar and introduced service to Casablanca, Entebbe, Jakarta, Kilimanjaro, Madras, Rome, San'a', Zanzibar and Zürich.

=== 1993–2005: new livery and destinations ===
In May 1994, Gulf Air received its first Airbus A340-300. Two months later, the carrier began flights to New York City using an A340. The Gulf Air website was opened in January 1997, and New York services were discontinued the following month. A no-smoking policy was established in 1998 on flights to Singapore and Australia, which was later introduced on all flights. In 1999, Gulf Air launched three new routes in northern Pakistan: Islamabad, Lahore and Peshawar. It also took delivery of two Airbus A330-200s, and introduced a new uniform designed by Balmain.

In 2000, the airline celebrated its 50th anniversary. It took delivery of the remaining Airbus A330-200 aircraft in June, and launched services to Milan. Later in August 2000, Gulf Air Flight 072, operating on a flight from Cairo to Bahrain was involved in a fatal crash which resulted in 143 deaths.

In May 2002, James Hogan became president and CEO of Gulf Air and instigated a restructuring and turnaround programme in response to a drastic fall in profits and increasing debt. By 1 August 2002, Qatar announced its intentions to withdraw from Gulf Air to focus on its own national airline, Qatar Airways. The state remained a member state for a six-month period after announcing the intention to withdraw.

In 2003, Gulf Air introduced a new Landor Associates-designed gold and blue livery and, in June, established Gulf Traveller, a subsidiary, all-economy, full-service airline. It also announced a sponsorship deal for the Bahrain Grand Prix through 2010, creating the Gulfair Bahrain Grand Prix, of which the first was staged in 2004. The airline also introduced daily flights to Athens and Sydney via Singapore on 23 November 2003.

In 2004, Gulf Air introduced direct flights between Dubai and London, Muscat and London, and a daily service between Abu Dhabi and Ras Al Khaimah. The airline carried a record 7.5 million passengers during that year. Gulf Air's sponsorship of the Bahrain Formula 1 Grand Prix continued, with a record race crowd and a global TV audience. The airline announced a return to profit, with the best financial performance since 1997. Despite a BD30 million (US$80 million) cost to the business through fuel price rises during the year, Gulf Air recorded a profit of BD1.5 million (US$4.0 million) in the calendar year to December 2004, on revenues up 23.8% to BD476.3 million (US$1.26 billion) (2003: BD 384.6 million / USD1,020.2 million). The results meant the airline out-performed the targets set under Project Falcon, the three-year restructuring plan approved by the Board in December 2002.

The owner states of Gulf Air at that time—the Kingdom of Bahrain, the Emirate of Abu Dhabi, and the Sultanate of Oman—confirmed their support for further expansion of the airline through a new three-year strategic plan which would include re-equipment of the aircraft fleet and recapitalization of the business through private-sector financing. Gulf Air was also placed on the IOSA registry following its successful completion of the IATA Operational Safety Audit (IOSA).

=== 2006–2009: full ownership by Bahrain ===
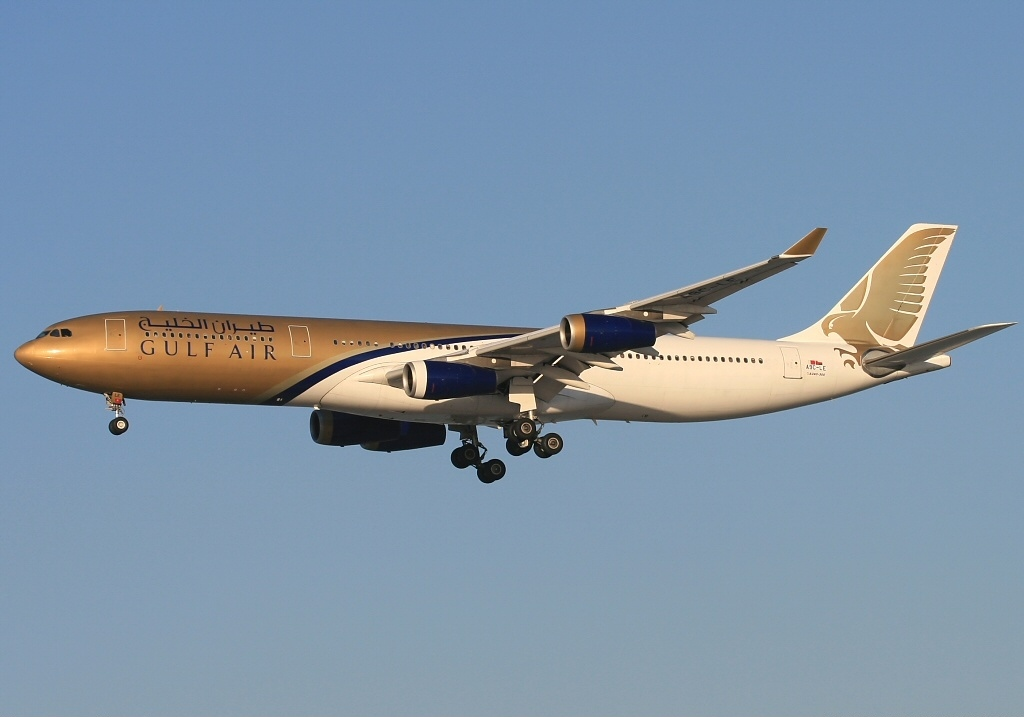
Gulf Air Airbus A340-300 (2007)

The new summer schedule commencing 28 April 2006 saw the complete withdrawal from Abu Dhabi as a hub, following the decision on 13 September 2005 by the Emirate of Abu Dhabi to withdraw from Gulf Air and establish UAE flag carrier Etihad Airways. Gulf Air changed its operations to a dual-hub basis between Bahrain and Muscat airports. The airline ran a series of advertisements in local newspapers, thanking Abu Dhabi for its contribution to Gulf Air. As the national carrier for the United Arab Emirates for over 35 years, it had a large customer base located in Abu Dhabi. Gulf Air endeavoured to show continuing support for flights to Abu Dhabi from Bahrain and Muscat, connecting to the rest of the Gulf Air network, via advertisements placed in local newspapers.

James Hogan resigned as president and chief executive officer as of 1 October 2006 (subsequently becoming CEO at rival airline Etihad). Ahmed Al Hammadi was named acting chief executive officer, until Swiss national André Dosé, the former chief executive officer of Crossair and Swiss International Air Lines, became CEO on 1 April 2007. A few days later, Dosé announced a BD310 million (US$825 million) restructuring plan. This included originating or terminating all flights in Bahrain; ceasing routes to Johannesburg, Dublin, Jakarta, Singapore, Hong Kong and Sydney; eliminating all Boeing 767s and Airbus A340-300s from the fleet; introducing the Airbus A321 in July 2007 and the Airbus A330-300 in 2009; and potentially terminating employment based on performance, and without regard for nationality. This led to some employees applying for jobs in other airlines and, in less than a month, Gulf Air lost 500 persons from its workforce, prompting the airline to rule out mass layoffs as part of its recovery plan, except for performance reasons.

On 5 May 2007, the government of Bahrain has taken full ownership of the airline following an extraordinary general meeting, as its joint-owner Oman withdrew from the airline to focus on Oman Air. Gulf Air had also announced cutbacks to 25% of its workforce or roughly 1,500 jobs as part of a 2-year restructuring program to stop losses of $1 million a day. André Dosé resigned on 23 July 2007 and was replaced by Bjorn Naf, prompting the Bahraini government to call for further transparency in the airline's running, and delegating parliament's financial and economic affairs committee to investigate Gulf Air's situation. On 6 November 2007, Gulf Air started its third daily non-stop flight to London Heathrow from Bahrain.

The airline inaugurated services to Shanghai Pudong International Airport on 16 June 2008 (the route was terminated on 25 December 2009). It also placed orders with Boeing (for 16 787s) and Airbus (for 15 A320s and 20 A330s) to upgrade its fleet. The airline's last commercial Boeing 767 flight was on 29 May 2008. On 3 July 2008, Gulf Air was announced as the official sponsor of London association football club, Queens Park Rangers. The same year, Gulf Air signed a lease agreement for five aircraft with International Lease Finance Corporation (ILFC) as part of its growth and expansion strategy. The lease was for six years for two Airbus A319s and three Airbus A330-200s, due for delivery from March through May 2009.

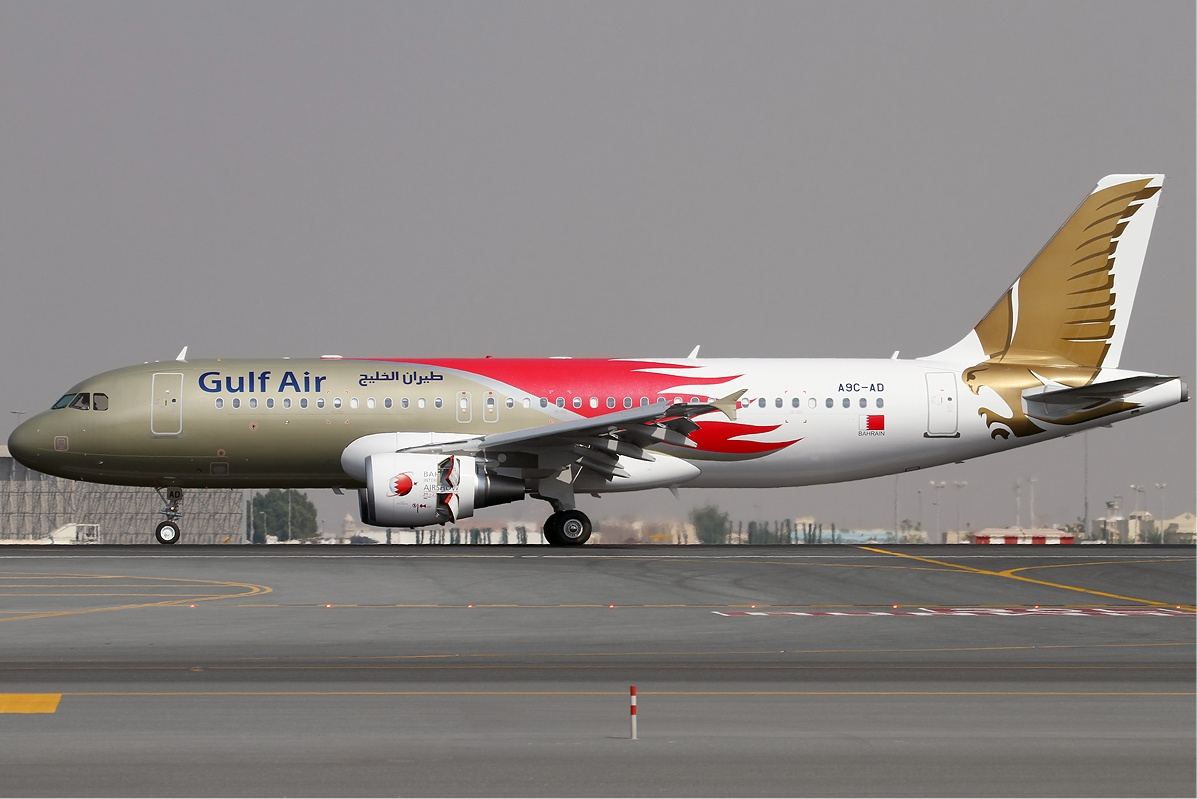
Gulf Air Airbus A320-200 in Bahrain Air Show livery

In March 2009, Gulf Air signed a 42-month lease agreement with Jet Airways for four Boeing 777-300ERs, but the aircraft were returned to Jet Airways starting in September 2009. In May, Gulf Air inaugurated summer seasonal flights to Alexandria, Aleppo and Salalah. On 1 September 2009, Gulf Air resumed flights to Baghdad. Services to Najaf and Erbil began shortly afterward.

Starting June 2009, Gulf Air's Golden Falcon logo was seen on the streets of London, emblazoned on the side of the city's taxi cabs, as part a two-year marketing deal. Fifty Hackney Carriages were to be rolled out in full Gulf Air livery to promote the airline's flights from London Heathrow to Bahrain and beyond. Later in June, the carrier announced the departure of CEO Bjorn Naf and the appointment of Samer Majali (who worked previously for Royal Jordanian) as CEO effective 1 August 2009.

=== 2010s: restructuring ===
On 1 March 2010, Gulf Air launched its new "Falcon Gold" cabin, a single premium cabin merging business and first class together, aimed at offering higher standards of comfort for the standard premium price. As of August 2011, the new Flat Beds were installed on all aircraft except short-haul aircraft.

In 2011, Gulf Air temporarily suspended flights to Iran, Iraq and Lebanon during the height of the Bahraini uprising. The airline originally was to resume service to Iran from November 2012, but cancelled the plan as it was unable to receive approval from the Iranian authorities. Flights to Iran resumed in March 2014.

In November 2012, Gulf Air phased out its last Airbus A340-300. At the end of November 2012, it was announced that Gulf Air CEO Samer Majali's resignation had been accepted by the board of directors. Majali left by the end of 2012, after serving the company for three years. In March 2013, the airline announced that it cut 15% of its total staff alongside four unprofitable routes as part of its restructuring program. Maher Salman Al Musallam was the acting CEO of Gulf Air until May 2016, when he was officially appointed to the role. Musallam later resigned in June 2017 with his tenure being praised with reducing the airline's debts by 88%. On 12 November 2017, Gulf Air appointed former Croatia Airlines CEO Krešimir Kučko as the airline's new CEO.

At the Bahrain International Airshow in January 2016, Gulf Air ordered 12 Airbus A320neo and 17 A321neos for delivery from June 2018, and cancelled a commitment to acquire six A330-300 aircraft. In addition, the airline also announced a restructured order for 16 Boeing 787-9 aircraft. The new order of 16 Boeing 787-9 aircraft replaced an existing order for 16 of the smaller Boeing 787-8 aircraft. In June 2017, Gulf Air suspended its flights to Qatar during the Qatar diplomatic crisis. In February 2018, Gulf Air revealed its new livery. It consisted of an all-white fuselage with a smaller golden falcon on the tail and with dark blue 'Gulf Air' titles. In February 2019, the airline briefly suspended flights to Pakistan after the country temporarily closed its airspace due to increased tensions with India. In January 2020, Gulf Air retired its last Airbus A330-200 in favor of the newer Boeing 787-9.

== Corporate affairs ==
=== Ownership and structure ===
Gulf Air is state-owned. The airline's sole shareholder is the Gulf Air Group Holding Company, which holds the aviation assets of Mumtalakat, the sovereign wealth fund of the government of the Kingdom of Bahrain.

The Gulf Air Group Holding comprises national carrier Gulf Air, Bahrain Airport Company, BAC Jet Fuel Company, and Gulf Aviation Academy. The group also owns 44% of Bahrain Airport Services and 45% of Bahrain Duty Free.

The Gulf Air Group Holding board on 17 September 2025, announced the appointment of Martin Gauss as its group chief executive officer. Gauss, who was previously CEO at AirBaltic, was due to take up his new role on 4 November 2025. The previous CEO was Jeffrey Goh who was in office from 2023 to 2025.

=== Business trends ===
In 2011, due largely to political unrest in the state of Bahrain, Gulf Air lost BHD 95 million, and the loss grew to BHD 196 million in 2012. A decision was taken in 2013 to implement a turnaround plan that involved reducing the airline's fleet, number of staff and number of destinations, and the losses reduced - and in 2015, the loss reported was BHD 24.1 million, an 88% reduction from 2012. Efforts to become profitable have continued; in January 2019, the carrier announced a "boutique business model" as part of its business plans for 2019, as it aims to turn around its fortunes. In 2023, the airline recorded a BHD 440.2 million ($1.16 billion) at the end of 2023 financial year. The airline debts were BHD 301.8 million ($813 million) in 2023 and the airline plans to balance its books by the end of 2027.

Few business figures are released on a regular basis, but those available are shown below (as at year ending 31 December):

	2011	2012	2013	2014	2015	2016	2017	2018
Turnover (BHDm)								
Turnover (US$m)								
Net profit (BHDm)	−95.0	−196.0	−93.3	−62.7	−24.1	loss	loss	loss
Net profit (US$m)	−250.0	−520.0	−247.6	−166.4	−63.9	loss	loss	loss
Number of employees		3,800			2,800			
Number of passengers (m)	c. 6.0						5.3	
Passenger load factor (%)								
Number of aircraft (at year end)		39	26	28	28		28	34
Notes/sources								

=== Sponsorships ===
Gulf Air has been the naming rights sponsor of the Bahrain Grand Prix since 2004. Gulf Air was also the first ever shirt sponsor of Chelsea F.C. in 1983 and 1984. More recently, it was shirt sponsor of Queens Park Rangers F.C. from 2008 to 2011. It also sponsors the Bahrain International Airshow.

== Destinations ==
As of March 2023, Gulf Air flies to 51 destinations with 2 being seasonal in 30 countries across Africa, Asia and Europe from its hub at Bahrain International Airport. Gulf Air's own Falcon Gold lounge can be found at the airports of Bahrain, Dubai and London–Heathrow.

=== Codeshare agreements ===
Gulf Air has codeshare agreements with the following airlines:

- Aegean Airlines
- American Airlines
- Azerbaijan Airlines
- Bangkok Airways
- Biman Bangladesh Airlines
- Cathay Pacific
- Egyptair
- Emirates
- Ethiopian Airlines
- Etihad Airways
- Flynas
- KLM
- Middle East Airlines
- Oman Air
- Philippine Airlines
- Saudia
- SriLankan Airlines
- Thai Airways International
- Turkish Airlines

== Fleet ==
=== Current fleet ===
Gulf Air current fleet

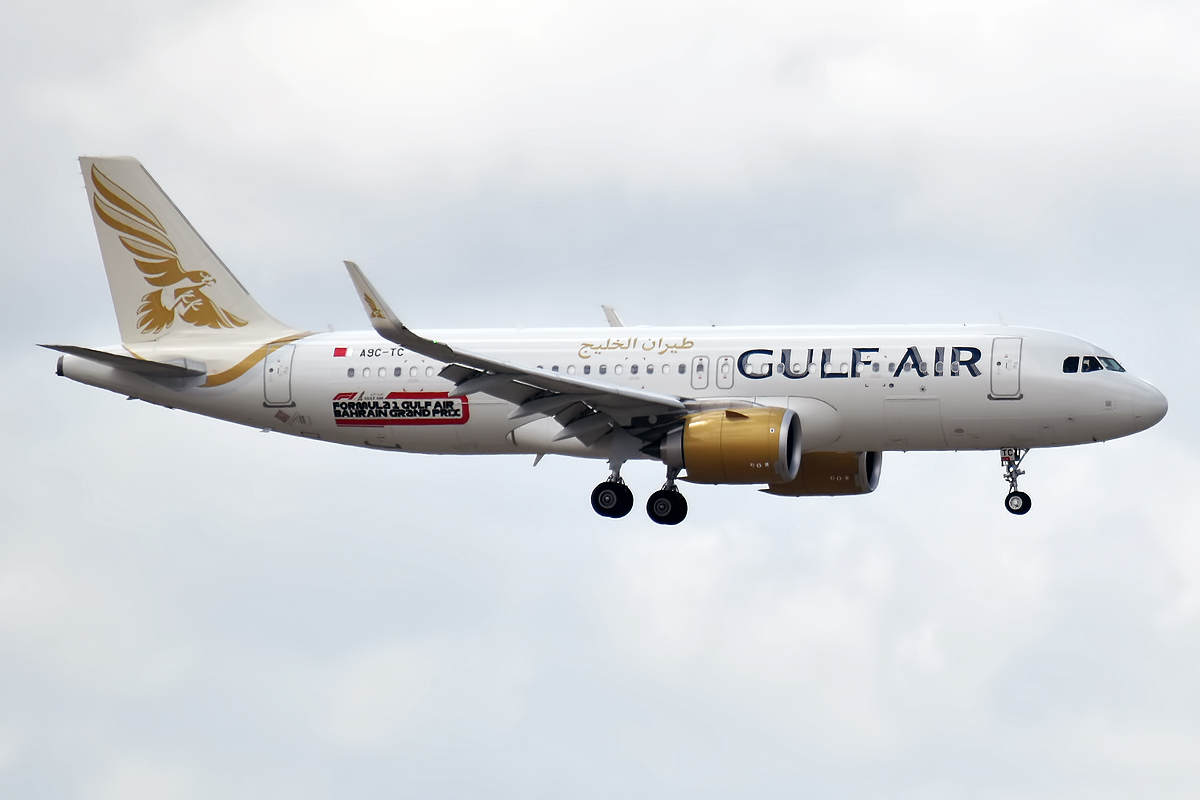
Gulf Air Airbus A320neo

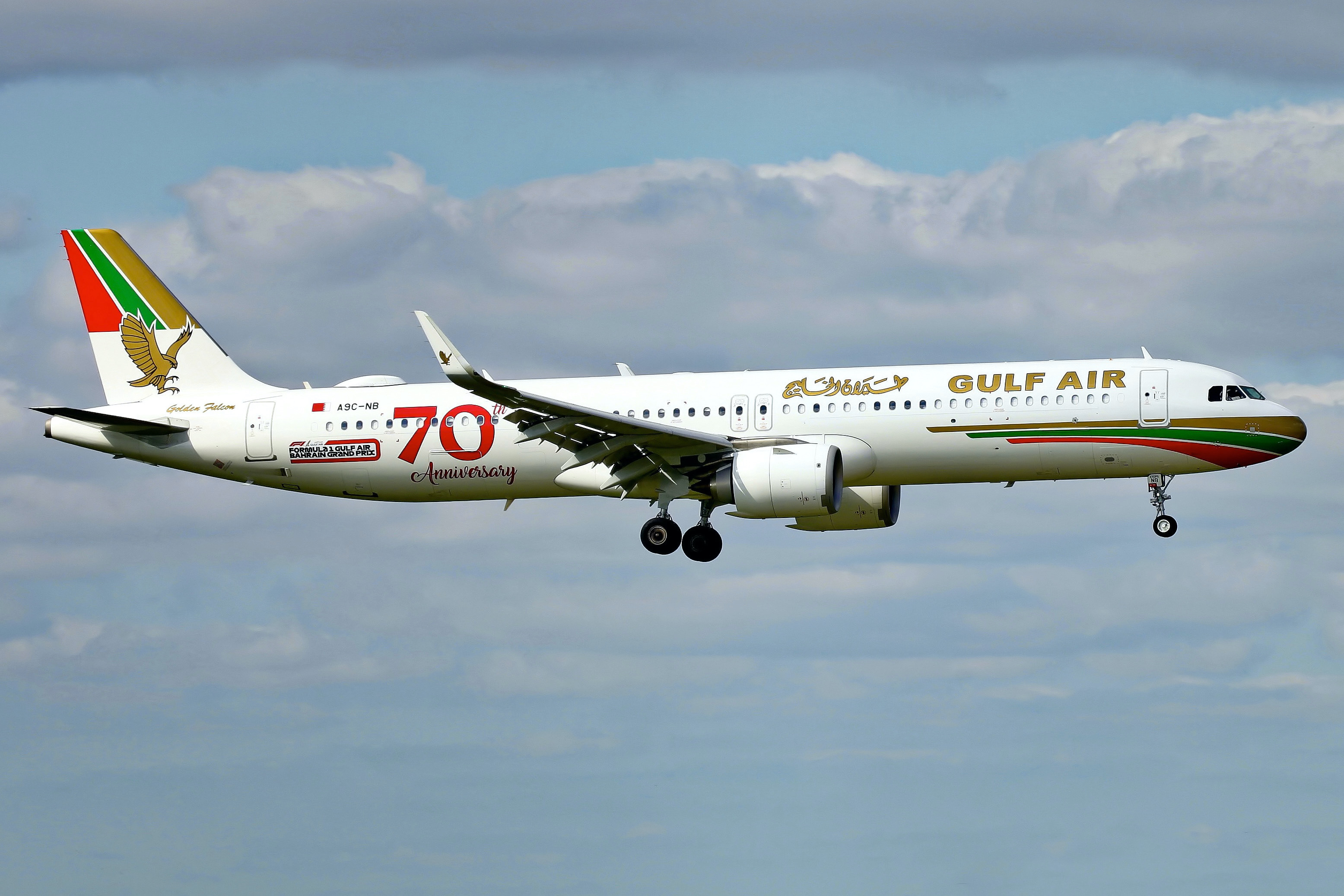
Gulf Air Airbus A321neo in a retro livery

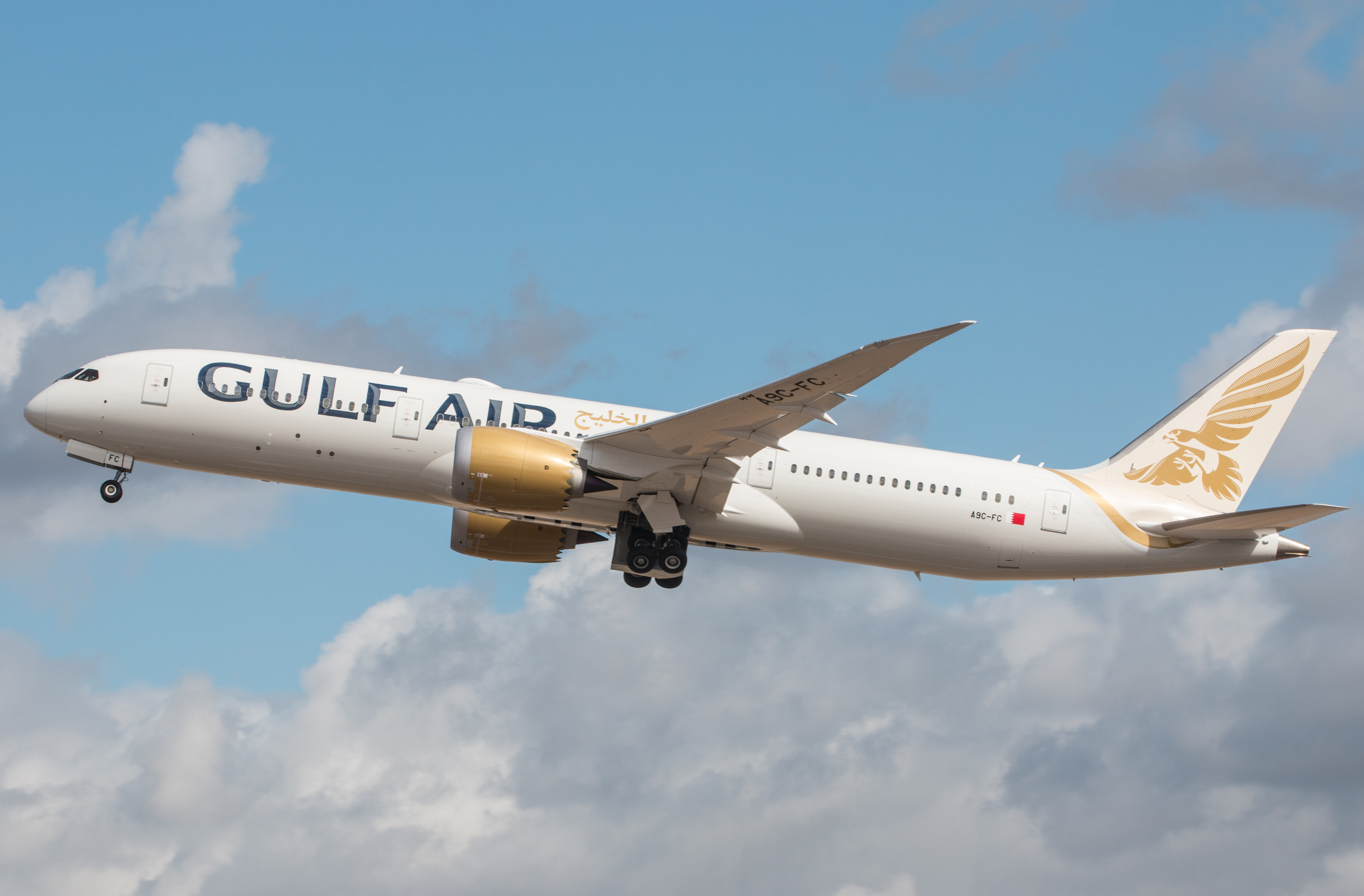
Gulf Air Boeing 787-9

As of January 2026, Gulf Air operates the following aircraft:

Gulf Air fleet
Aircraft	In service	Orders	Passengers				Notes
Aircraft	In service	Orders	J	Y	Total	Refs	Notes
Airbus A320-200	8	—	16	120	136		
Airbus A320neo	9	3	16	120	136		
Airbus A320neo	9	3	12	138	150		
Airbus A321-200	4	—	8	161	169		
Airbus A321neo	8	1	12	180	192		
Airbus A321LR	8	—	16	150	166		
Boeing 787-9	10	17	26	256	282		
Boeing 787-9	10	17	30	262	292		One aircraft leased from MIAT Mongolian Airlines.
Total	47	21					

== Accidents and incidents ==
- On 22 November 1976, a Gulf Air Short SC.7 Skyvan cargo plane travelling from Bahrain to Abu Dhabi-Al Bateen Airport experienced an engine failure. The crew abandoned the aircraft off Das Island. The two occupants were rescued while the airplane sank.
- On 23 September 1983, Gulf Air Flight 771 was a flight from Karachi, Pakistan to Qatar via Abu Dhabi. While the Boeing 737-200 was on approach to Abu Dhabi International Airport, a bomb exploded in the baggage compartment. The aircraft crashed in the desert near Mina Jebel Ali between Abu Dhabi and Dubai in the UAE. All 7 crew members and 105 passengers died. Most of the fatalities were Pakistani nationals, many returning to jobs in the Gulf after spending the Eid ul-Adha holiday with their families in Pakistan. The bomb was apparently planted by the Abu Nidal Organization, to pressure the Gulf States to pay protection money to Abu Nidal so as to avoid attacks on their soil.
- On 10 March 1997, a Gulf Air A320 (A4O-EM) aborted takeoff at Abu Dhabi International Airport and overran the runway, causing the nosegear to collapse. Everyone on board survived.
- On 23 August 2000, Gulf Air Flight 072 crashed into the waters of the Persian Gulf on approach to Bahrain International Airport from Cairo. The Airbus A320, with 143 passengers and crew on board, approached the landing at higher speeds than normal, and carried out an unusual low altitude orbit in an attempt to correct the approach. The orbit was unsuccessful and a go-around was attempted. While carrying out a turning climb the aircraft entered a descent at 15 degrees nose down. The aircrew did not respond to repeated GPWS warnings and approximately one minute after starting the go-around the aircraft disappeared from radar screens. All 143 passengers and crew, including 36 children, were killed in the accident. The accident investigation concluded that the primary cause of the crash was pilot error (including spatial disorientation), with a secondary factor being systemic organizational and oversight issues. Flight 072 was the highest death toll of any accident involving an Airbus A320 at that time. It was subsequently surpassed by TAM Airlines Flight 3054, which crashed on 17 July 2007 with 199 fatalities.
- On 29 August 2011, Gulf Air Flight 270, using an Airbus A320-214, from Bahrain to Cochin carrying 143 people, skidded off the runway on landing due to pilot error of loss of situational awareness during reduced visibility conditions. The weather was poor with heavy rain and strong winds. The aircraft was badly damaged with the nose gear collapsed and seven passengers were injured. Some people were reported to have jumped from an emergency exit when the evacuation slide failed to deploy.
