= Isa Air Base =

Isa Air Base Arabic: قاعدة الشيخ عيسى الجوية
- IATA: none; ICAO: OBBS

Summary
- Airport type: Military
- Operator: Royal Bahraini Air Force
- Location: Bahrain
- Elevation AMSL: 136 ft (41 m)
- Coordinates: 25°55′06″N 050°35′26″E
- Interactive map of Isa Air Base

Runways
Direction	Length		Surface
Direction	m	ft	Surface
15/33	3,800	12,467	Concrete and Asphalt
- Source: DAFIF

Isa Air Base (IAB), formerly known as Shaikh Isa Air Base (ICAO: OBBS), is a military airbase operated by the Royal Bahraini Air Force (RBAF), located on the shore of the Persian Gulf in southern Bahrain.

It hosts the Royal Bahraini Air Force Fighter Wing and the two squadrons that comprise it.

== Gulf War ==
During the first Gulf War, some of the Coalition forces, having trouble with the Arab pronunciation, knew the base under the name "Shakey's Pizza".

The 384th Air Expeditionary Wing operated from the base in 2003–2004.

== 2020s ==
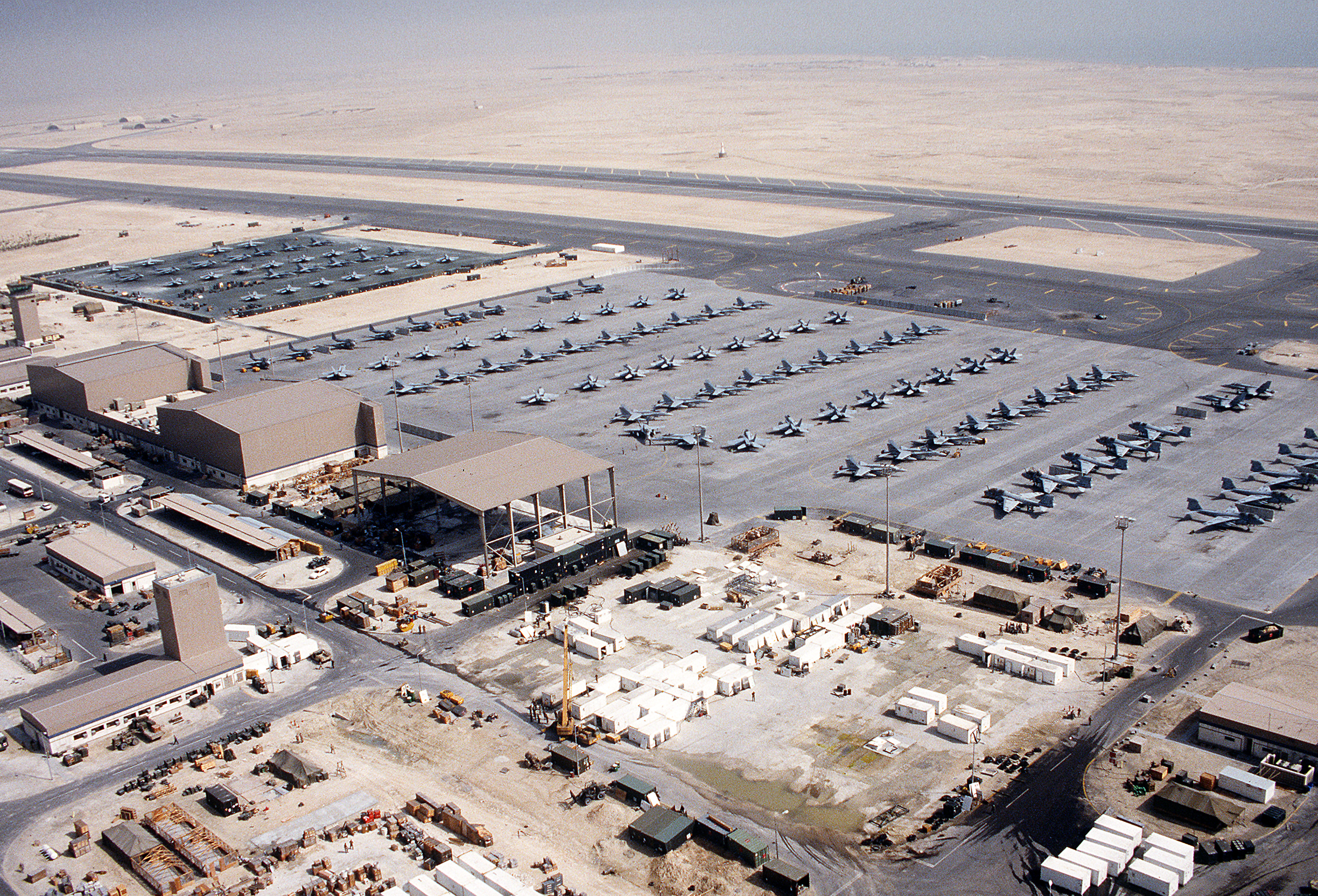
U.S. Marine Corps Marine Aircraft Group 11 aircraft at Sheik Isa, in 1991.

=== Bahrain ===
The base is home to the RBAF's 1st Fighter Wing:

- 1st Fighter Squadron – Lockheed Martin F-16 Fighting Falcon C/D Block 40
- 2nd Fighter Squadron – F-16C/D Block 40
- 6th Fighter Squadron – Northrop F-5E/F
- 5th Squadron – British Aerospace Hawk
- 4th Squadron – Slingsby T-67 Firefly

=== United States ===
In March 2009, the United States Air Force established a camp on Isa Air Base to support aerial port operations. The unit was designated a detachment of the 379th Air Expeditionary Wing of Al Udeid Air Base, Qatar. This detachment's purpose was to accelerate the delivery of mine-resistant ambush-protected all-terrain vehicles to U.S. forces in Afghanistan.

As part of its operations against ISIL, the United States deployed various aircraft there.

In August 2020, KBR took over base operations support services at Isa Air Base.

== See also ==
- List of airports in Bahrain
