= Samer Majali =

Jordanian businessman

Samer Majali (Arabic: سامر المجالي) is a British-Jordanian businessman and was the CEO of Gulf Air from 2009 until his resignation was announced on 2 December 2012. He is now CEO of Royal Jordanian.

== Biography ==
He attended Dean Close School and Cranfield University in England.

His career began in 1979.

Majali was the CEO of Royal Jordanian airlines from 2002 to 2009, and was credited for transforming the airline into one of the most successful in the region. Under his management, the airline recorded its first ever net profit. Upon his successful management of RJ, he was persuaded by the Government of Bahrain to assume the position of CEO of Gulf Air in 2009.
