= Riffa Air Base =

Air base in Riffa, Bahrain

Riffa Air Base
- Riffa, Southern Governorate in Bahrain

Site information
- Type: Helicopter base
- Owner: Bahrain Defence Force
- Operator: Royal Bahraini Air Force
- Controlled by: Helicopter Wing

Location
- Shown within Bahrain
- Coordinates: 26°06′30″N 050°34′45″E

Site history
- In use: Unknown - present

Airfield information
- Elevation: 36 metres (118 ft) AMSL
Helipads
Number	Length and surface
13/31	175 metres (574 ft) Concrete

Riffa Air Base is an air base of the Royal Bahraini Air Force located 3.2 kilometres (2.0 mi) south east of Riffa, Southern Governorate, Bahrain and home to the Helicopter Wing of the RBAF.

It is home to the:

- 3rd Helicopter Squadron with the Bell AB212 and Bell 412EP
- 8th Helicopter Squadron with the Bell AH-1FB Cobra
- 9th Helicopter Squadron with the AH-1FB
- 10th Helicopter Squadron with the Bell 505 Jet Ranger X
- 12th Helicopter Squadron with the Sikorsky UH-60M Black Hawk
- 22nd Helicopter Squadron with the Bell AH-1Z Zulu

== See also ==
- List of airports in Bahrain
