= List of airports in Bahrain =

This is a list of airports in Bahrain, sorted by location.

== Airports ==
Location	ICAO	IATA	Airport name	Coordinates
Civil Airports				
Muharraq	OBBI	BAH	Bahrain International Airport	26°16′15″N 050°38′01″E
Military Airports				
Qurayn Al Dhirban	OBBS		Shaikh Isa Air Base	25°55′06″N 050°35′26″E
Sakhir	OBKH	KHB	Sakhir Air Base	26°02′02″N 050°31′29″E
Riffa			Riffa Air Base	26°06′31″N 050°34′42″E

== See also ==
- Transport in Bahrain
- List of the busiest airports in the Middle East
- List of airports by ICAO code: O#OB - Bahrain
- Wikipedia: WikiProject Aviation/Airline destination lists: Asia#Bahrain
