= Sakhir Air Base =

Sakhir Air Base مطار الصخير الدولي
- IATA: KHB; ICAO: OBKH

Summary
- Airport type: Public
- Serves: Awali
- Location: Bahrain
- Elevation AMSL: 49 ft / 15 m
- Coordinates: 26°02′05″N 050°31′28″E

Map
- Location of Sakhir Air Base in Bahrain

Runways
Direction	Length		Surface
Direction	ft	m	Surface
17/35	10,500	3,200	Asphalt
- Source: Landings.com

Sakhir Air Base (ICAO: OBKH) is a military airport located 3 nautical miles (5.5 km) south-southwest of Awali, Bahrain.

The airbase itself was built for the Bahrain International Airshow, held every two years in November. Jets come from multiple countries such as Russia, Saudi Arabia, Qatar, United Arab Emirates, India, and many others to show off to the local community. The next edition of the airshow is scheduled to take place on Shakir Air Base on 18–20 November 2026.

The airport is also used by VIP visitors, foreign top government officials, visiting heads of states and the king of Bahrain himself.

== See also ==
- List of airports in Bahrain
