= 159th Aviation Regiment (United States) =

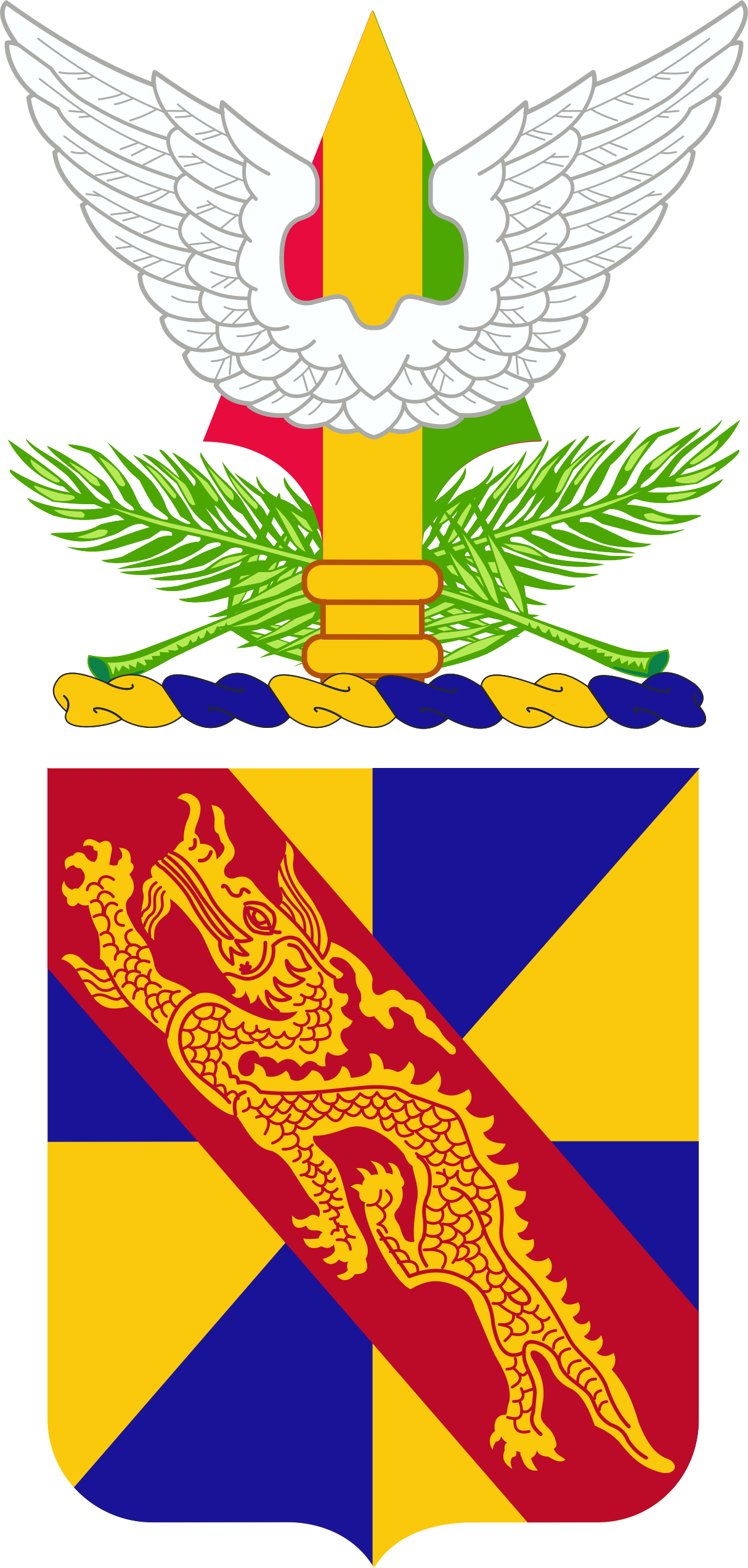
- coat of arms
- Active: 2 July 1968-
- Country: USA
- Branch: United States Army Aviation Branch
- Type: Aviation

Insignia
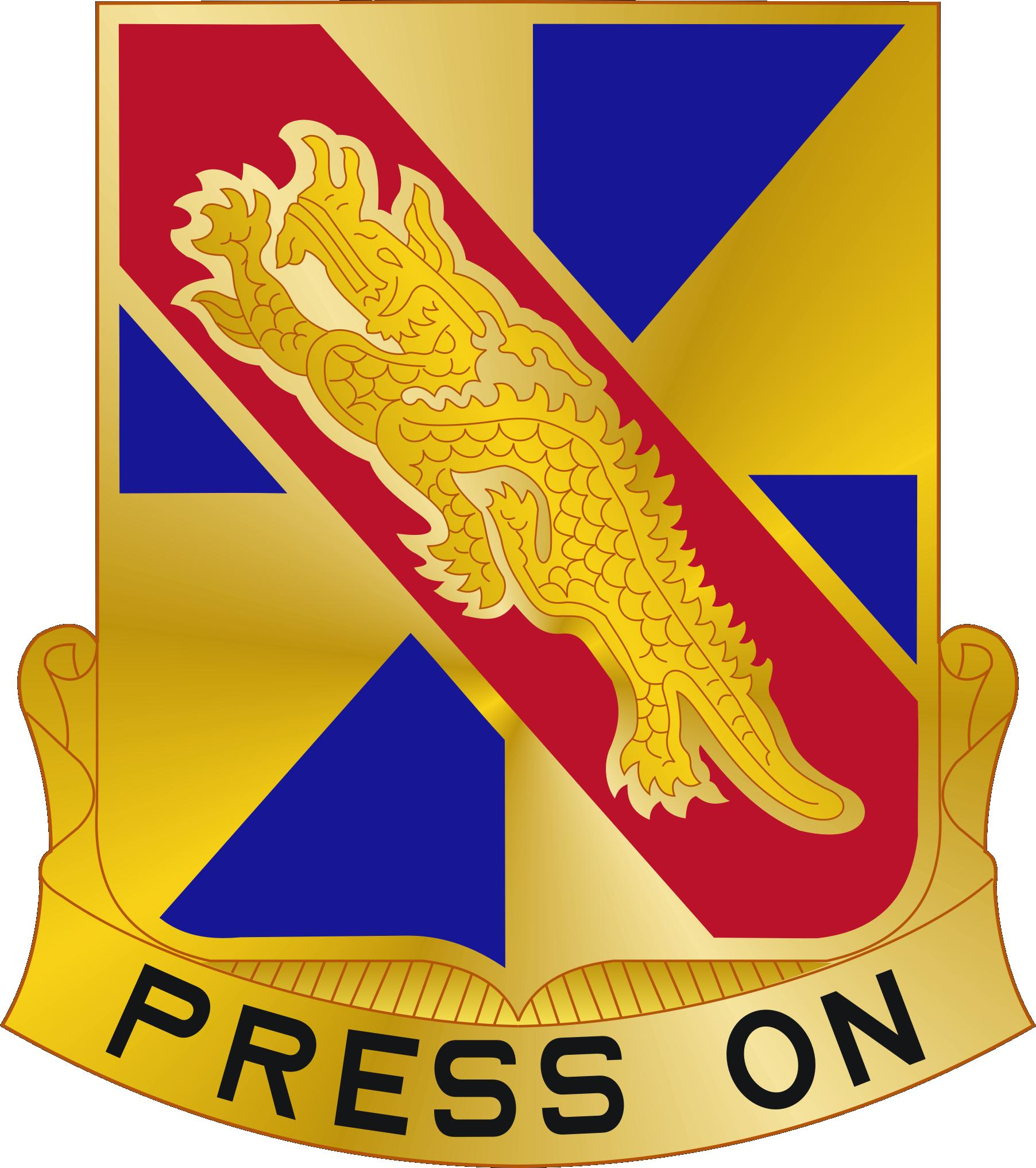
- Distinctive Unit Insignia

Aircraft flown
- Attack helicopter: AH-64 Apache
- Cargo helicopter: CH-47F Chinook
- Utility helicopter: UH-60L Black Hawk

The 159th Aviation Regiment is an aviation regiment of the U.S. Army.

== History ==
Initially formed from assets of the 308th Aviation Battalion (Combat), the 159th Aviation Battalion (Assault Support Helicopter) was constituted on 1 July 1968 and served in the Regular Army in Vietnam as a part of the 101st Airborne Division (Airmobile).

Its Company B was reorganized and redesignated on 16 November 1987 as Headquarters and Headquarters Company, 2d Battalion, 159th Aviation; however, it was inactivated 10 years later on 15 September 1997 before being redesignated on 16 October 1997 as Company B, 159th Aviation, and activated at Hunter Army Airfield, Georgia. Later it moved to Felker Army Airfield at Fort Eustis, VA. HHC and B Company were deployed in Kuwait and Iraq between February 2003 and April 2004, before being inactivated a month later on 15 May 2004 at Ft. Eustis.

The 159th Aviation Regiment was redesignated to the same company on 1 October 2005 before it was redesignated again a year later 16 October 2006 as Headquarters and Headquarters Company, 2d Battalion.

Numerous other elements of the regiment have been active as well:

3d Battalion, 159th Aviation Regiment

5th Battalion, 159th Aviation Regiment

Company I, 159th Aviation Regiment

Company K, 159th Aviation Regiment

== Current structure ==
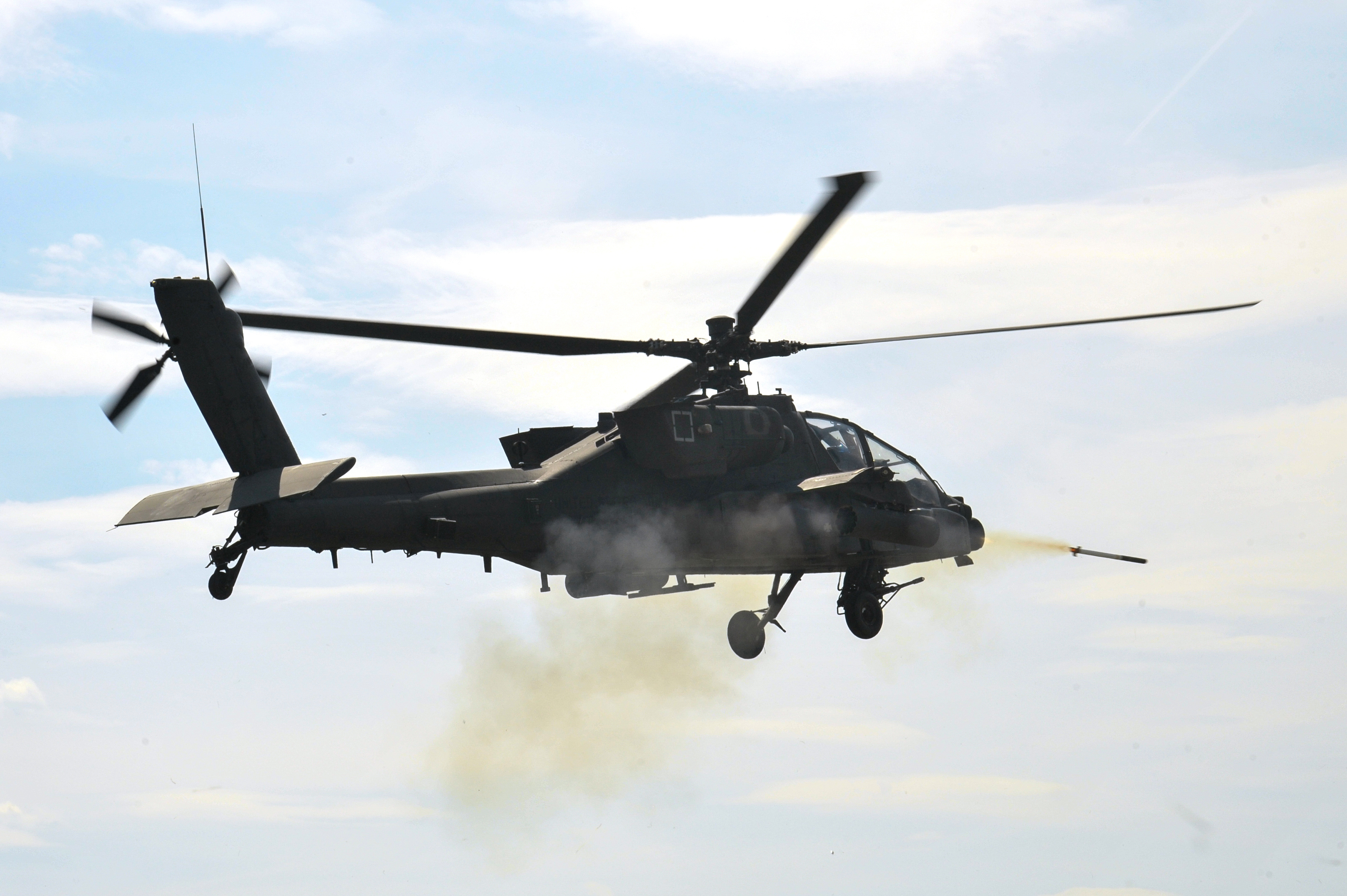
AH-64 Apache helicopter assigned to the 2nd Battalion, 159th Aviation Regiment

- 1st Battalion
  - Company A
    - Kuwait/ Iraq/ Southwest Asia 1990 - 1991
  - Company B
    - Kuwait/ Iraq/ Southwest Asia 1990 - 1991
- 2nd Battalion
  - Company A
    - Afghanistan Sep 2009 - Apr 2010
    - Afghanistan Aug 2010 - Nov 2010
- 5th Battalion (General Support)
  - Headquarters and Headquarters Company (HHC) "Dragon Masters"
    - Iraq-2019 (OIR)
  - Company A "Ghost Riders"
    - Southwest Asia 1990 - 1991
    - Iraq 2019 (OIR)
  - Company B "Freight Train"
    - Kuwait/ Iraq Feb 2003- Apr 2004
    - Iraq 2009–2010
    - Afghanistan June 2016- May 2017
  - Company C (Fort Knox, KY) (HH-60) "Bourbon Dustoff"
    - Afghanistan Dec 2008 – Dec 2009
    - Afghanistan Nov 2015 - June 2016
    - Iraq 2019
  - Company D "Dark Wolves"
    - Iraq 2019
  - Company E
  - Company G "Devil Rays Dustoff"
    - Detachment 1
      - Iraq May 2019

== Campaign participation credit ==
=== Vietnam ===
- Counteroffensive, Phase V
- Counteroffensive, Phase VI
- Tet 69/Counteroffensive
- Summer-Fall 1969
- Winter-Spring 1970
- Sanctuary Counteroffensive
- Counteroffensive, Phase VII
- Consolidation I
- Consolidation II

=== Southwest Asia ===
- Defense of Saudi Arabia
- Liberation and Defense of Kuwait

=== War on terrorism ===
==== Iraq ====
- Iraqi Surge
- Iraqi Sovereignty
- OIR
