= Bahrain International Airshow =

International Airshow in Bahrain

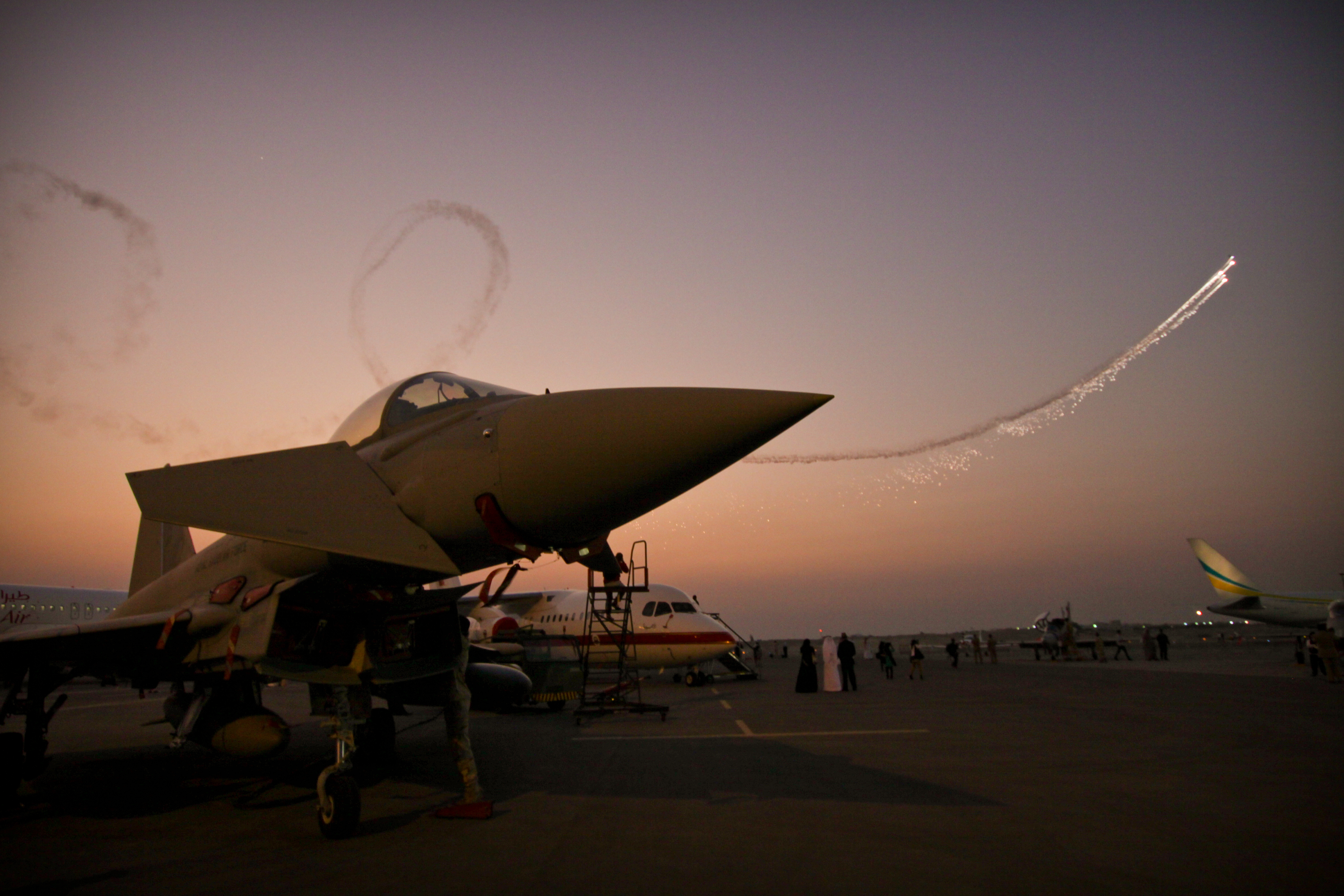
Photograph from the 2012 edition of the airshow

The Bahrain International Airshow (BIAS) is a biennial airshow hosted at the Sakhir Air Base in the Kingdom of Bahrain. Established in 2010, the event is organised by the Civil Aviation Affairs of Bahrain in association with the UK-based Farnborough International. The airshow has drawn hundreds of companies and tens of thousands of visitors.

== History ==
The inaugural airshow took place on 21–23 January 2010 at the Sakhir Air Base, close to the Bahrain International Circuit. The second edition of the airshow took place on 19–21 January 2012. The 2014 edition took place on 16–18 January and was opened by the Crown Prince of Bahrain, Shaikh Salman bin Hamad Al Khalifa. The 2016 edition was held on 21–23 January and saw sales estimated at $9 billion, believed to be three times higher than the 2014 edition. The 2016 edition was the last to take place in January, with the 2018 edition being shifted to November 2018 to accommodate the increase in popularity. The 2018 edition took place on 14–16 November 2018 and featured over a hundred aircraft. The 2020 edition was delayed to 9-11 November 2022 due to the COVID-19 pandemic. It was also opened by the Crown Prince.

Crowds in attendance at the 2024 edition

The 2024 edition of the airshow drew 57,000 visitors and involved 177 participating companies from 83 countries. Lockheed Martin signed a sponsorship deal for the airshow in the preceding year.

The 2026 edition of the airshow was postponed from 18–20 November 2026 to 15–17 November 2028, in an announcement by the BIAS supreme organising committee.
