= Royal Bahraini Air Force =

Air warfare branch of Bahrain's military

- سلاح الجو الملكي البحريني
- Emblem of the Royal Bahraini Air Force
- Founded: 1976; 50 years ago
- Country: Bahrain
- Type: Air force
- Role: Aerial warfare
- Size: 1,500 personnel 127 aircraft
- Part of: Bahrain Defence Force
- Engagements: Gulf War; Saudi-led intervention in the Yemeni civil war; 2026 Iran war

Commanders
- Commander: Air Vice Marshal Sheikh Hammad bin Abdullah Al Khalifa

Insignia
- Roundel

- Fin flash

- Flag

Aircraft flown
- Fighter: F-16 Fighting Falcon, F-5
- Helicopter: Bell 212, Bell 412, MBB BO-105, UH-60
- Attack helicopter: AH-1E, AH-1P, TAH-1P
- Trainer: BH-129, T-67
- Transport: C-130, BAE-146

The Royal Bahraini Air Force (Arabic: سلاح الجو الملكي البحريني, abbreviated as RBAF, formerly known as Bahrain Amiri Air Force) is the aerial warfare branch of the Bahrain Defence Force (BDF). Originally formed as the BDF Air Wing in 1976, it became an independent service branch in 1987. The RBAF was involved in combat operations during the Gulf War, the Saudi-led intervention in Yemen, and the 2026 Iran war.

Bahrain has developed a well-equipped air force and was the second country in the Gulf Cooperation Council after Saudi Arabia to acquire advanced fighters, namely the F-16C/D in 1989, which have been the RBAF's main combat aircraft since then. Bahrain was the first country in the Gulf to use the F-16. In the early 2010s Bahrain decided to replace its older F-5E and F-5F fighters with more modern planes, as well as to modernize its existing F-16 fleet. It ordered 16 new planes of the F-16 Block 70 variant, which it acquired in 2024. The F-16 Block 70 achieved its first aerial kill during the war with Iran, when an RBAF warplane shot down Iranian drones. The RBAF launched strikes inside Iran in July 2026, after the 2026 Iranian strikes on Bahrain.

== History ==
=== Founding and early expansion ===
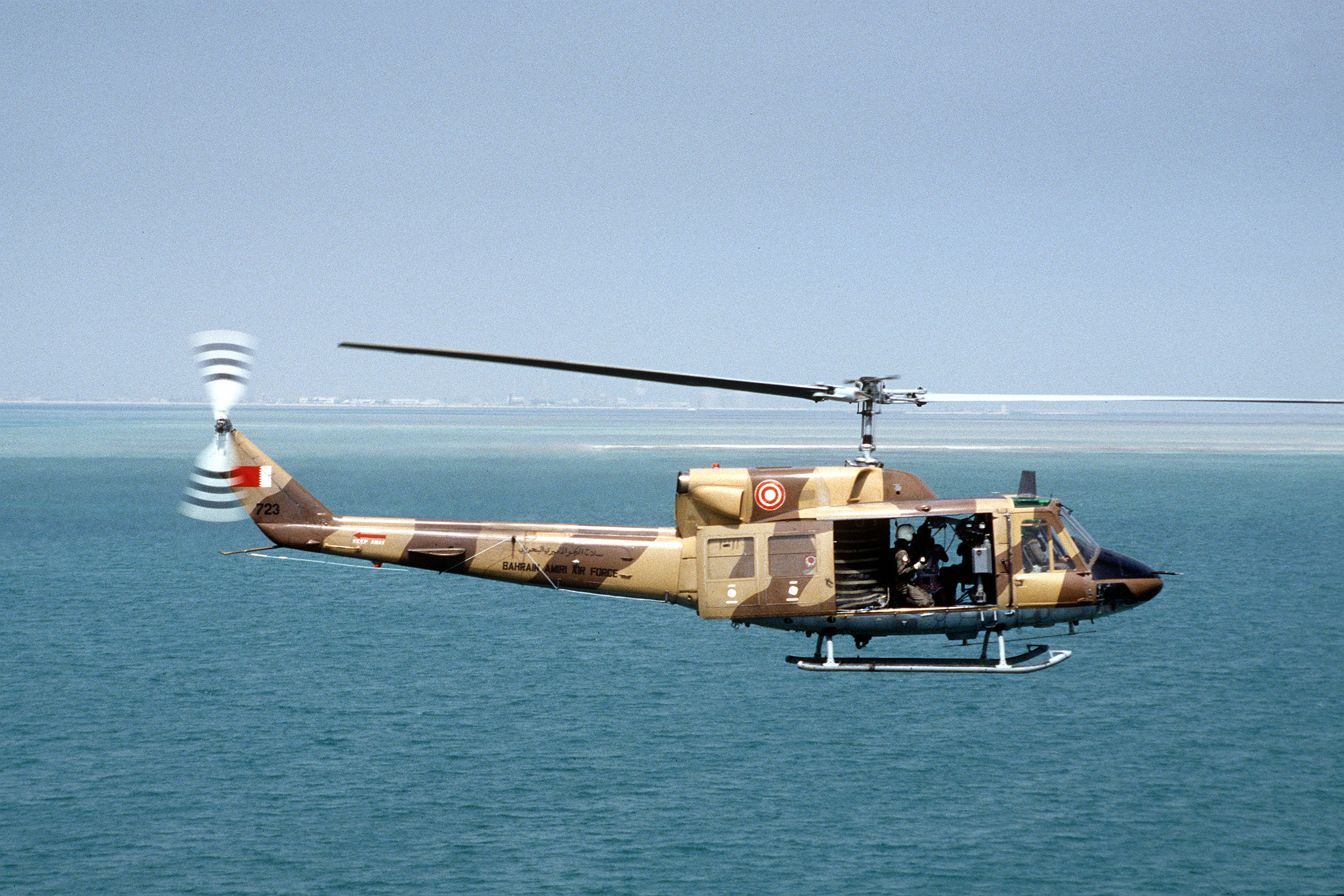
A Bahrain Air Force Agusta-Bell 212 Twin Huey in flight over the Persian Gulf during a training mission in 1991.

The Bahrain Defence Force, which itself was formed in 1968, just before the country became independent from United Kingdom in 1971, first organized an air wing in May 1976 at Riffa Air Base, which received its first aircraft, four Bo 105 helicopters, in February 1977. This occurred after Bahrain sent the air wing's future members to receive training from allied countries in 1974. The small force grew gradually, receiving 12 Augusta Bell Twin Huey helicopters in 1978, and in the mid-1980s the air wing became the new Bahrain Amiri Air Force (BAAF). In the early years the Bahraini Air Force participated in training with other countries and helped recover U.S. Navy sailors after the USS Stark incident during the Iran–Iraq War. Because of regional conflicts like the Iran–Iraq War and the Gulf War, during the 1980s and 1990s Bahrain expanded its military, including its Air Force, with the assistance of the United States.

In 1985 Bahrain acquired its first fighter jets, the F-5, and established the 6th Fighter Squadron at Muharraq Air Base. After Bahraini air crews became familiar with the F-5, they underwent training to prepare to use the F-16 Fighting Falcon. The first Bahraini F-16s, the F-16C/D variants, were acquired in 1990. This made Bahrain the first Gulf country to fly the F-16. Before this, the country considered several American and European advanced fighter aircraft, including the F-15 Eagle, F-16 Fighting Falcon, F/A-18 Hornet, Mirage 2000, and Tornado. Bahraini pilots were trained on F-16 operations at MacDill Air Force Base in Florida in 1989, and the first F-16 was formally handed over to the BAAF in March of that year. The first four F-16s were sent to Bahrain, flown by Bahraini pilots, in May 1990.

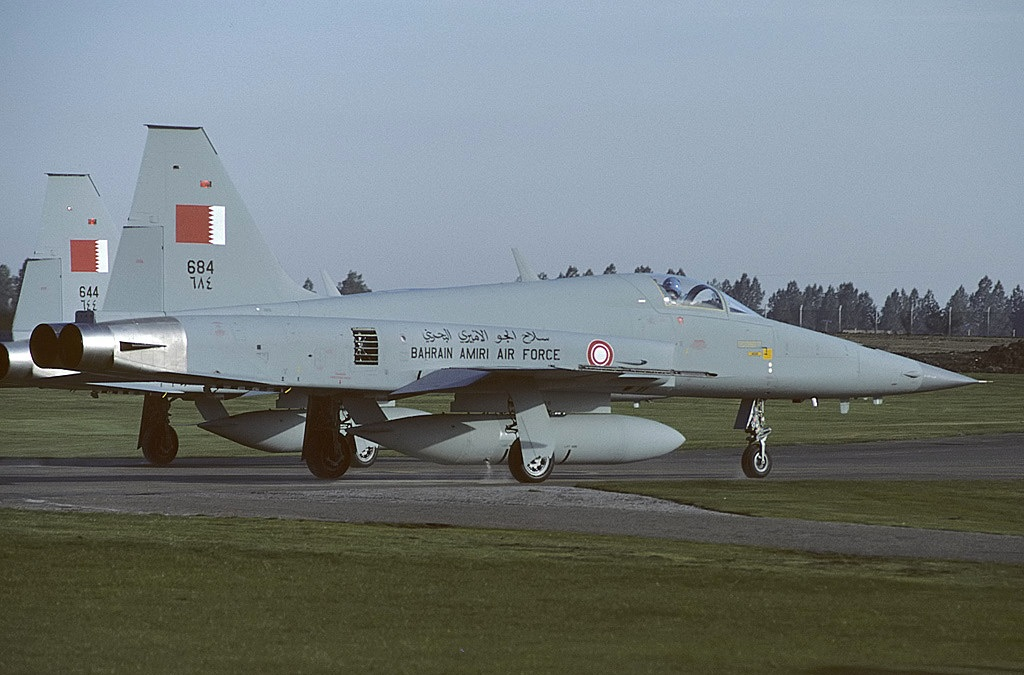
A Northrop F-5E Tiger II of the Bahrain Amiri Air Force in 1986

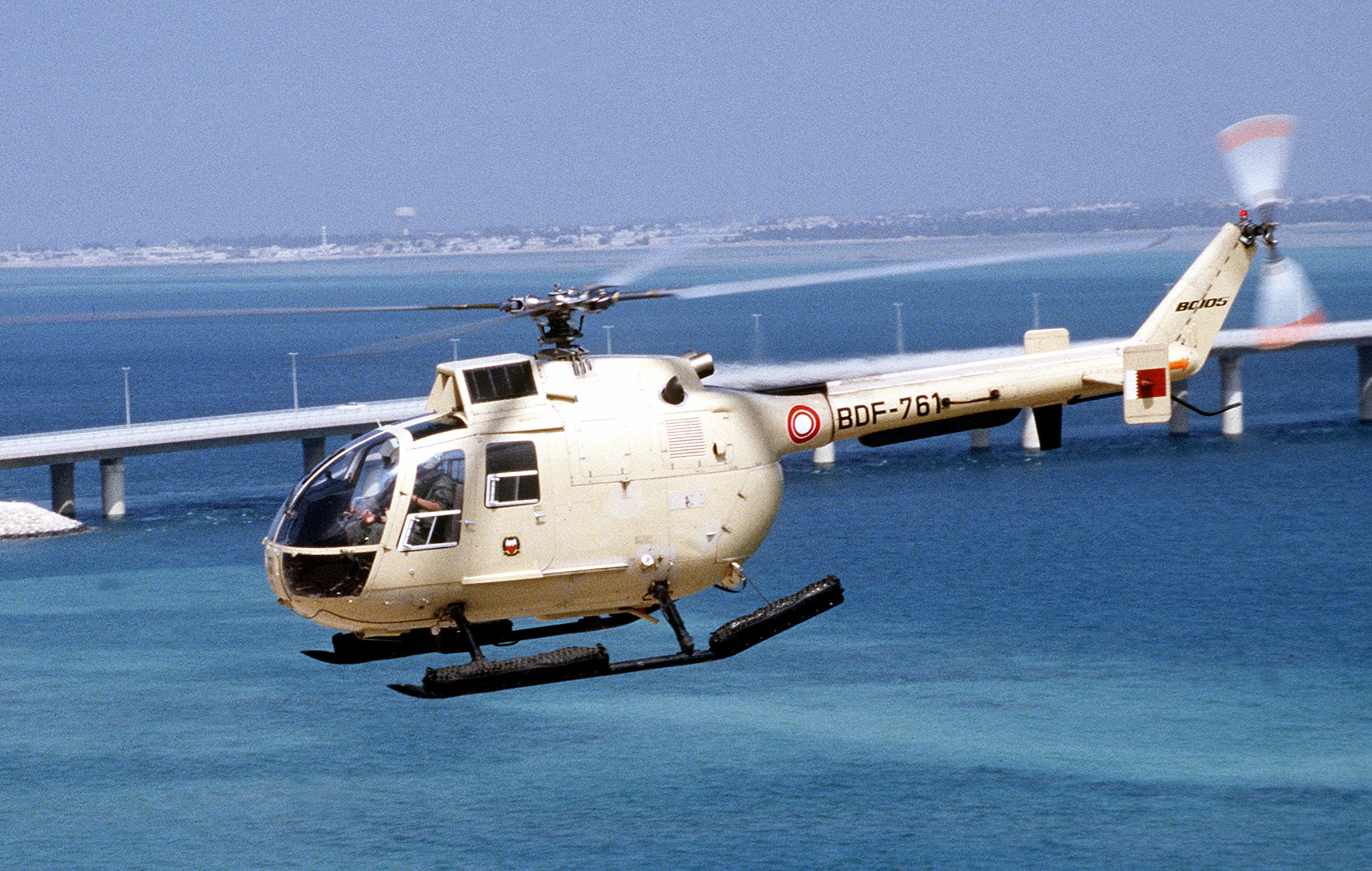
A Bahraini BO-105 helicopter during the Gulf War in 1991

Around this time the construction of Isa Air Base was complete, which is where the Bahraini F-16s have been based. Both the F-16 and the F-5 were operated by Bahrain in the Gulf War, during which the BAAF carried out air strikes against Iraq. The new Bahraini F-16s were flown by the 1st Tactical Fighter Squadron in Operation Desert Storm, operating alongside coalition forces, which included 200 American aircraft based out of the Isa Air Base, along with the BAAF. The operations lasted from 25 January 1991 until the end of the war, with an average of six sorties per day.

A second batch of ten F-16s commenced delivery in 2000 under the Peace Crown II program. The new aircraft represented a further increase in the air force's combat capabilities, as they were equipped to carry the AMRAAM missile, first used by the USAF in 1992. Air-to-air armament had been limited to the short-range AIM-9M Sidewinder missile and internal cannon through the Gulf War. After the war, the country began to acquire more advanced weapons, including the AIM-7M Sparrow radar-guided air-to-air missile and LANTIRN navigation and targeting pod for air-to-ground weapons that would also be acquired such as the GBU-10/12 laser guided bombs and AGM-65D/G Maverick air-to-ground missiles.

In 1994 the 8th Helicopter Squadron was established with Bell AH-1 Cobra attack helicopters, followed by the 9th Helicopter Squadron in 1997, for the purpose of providing close air support to the Royal Bahraini Army. In 1999 the Air Defense Wing, equipped with the Hawk missile system, was brought under the control of the Air Force.

=== 21st century ===
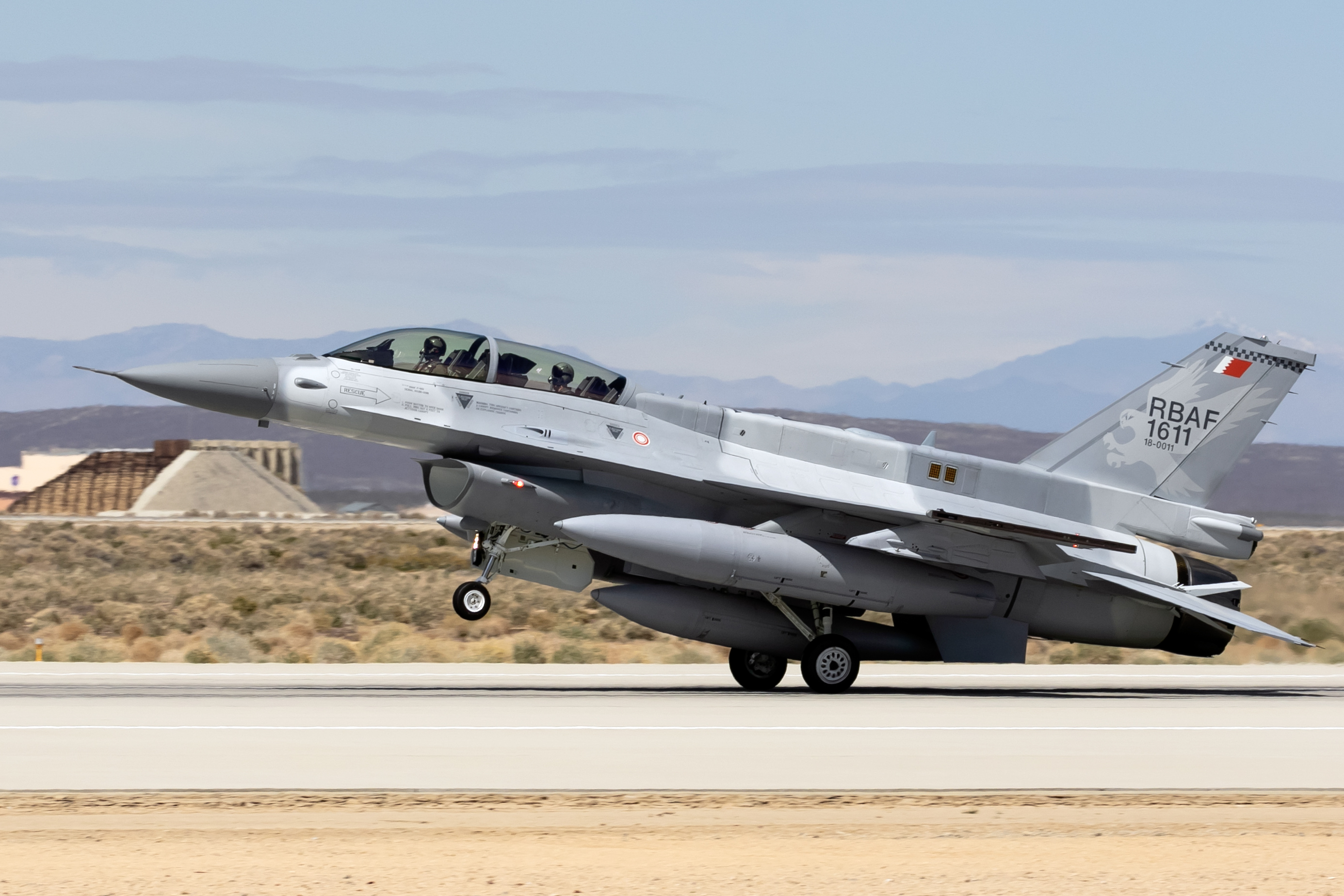
A Bahraini F-16 lands at Edwards Air Force Base, 2023

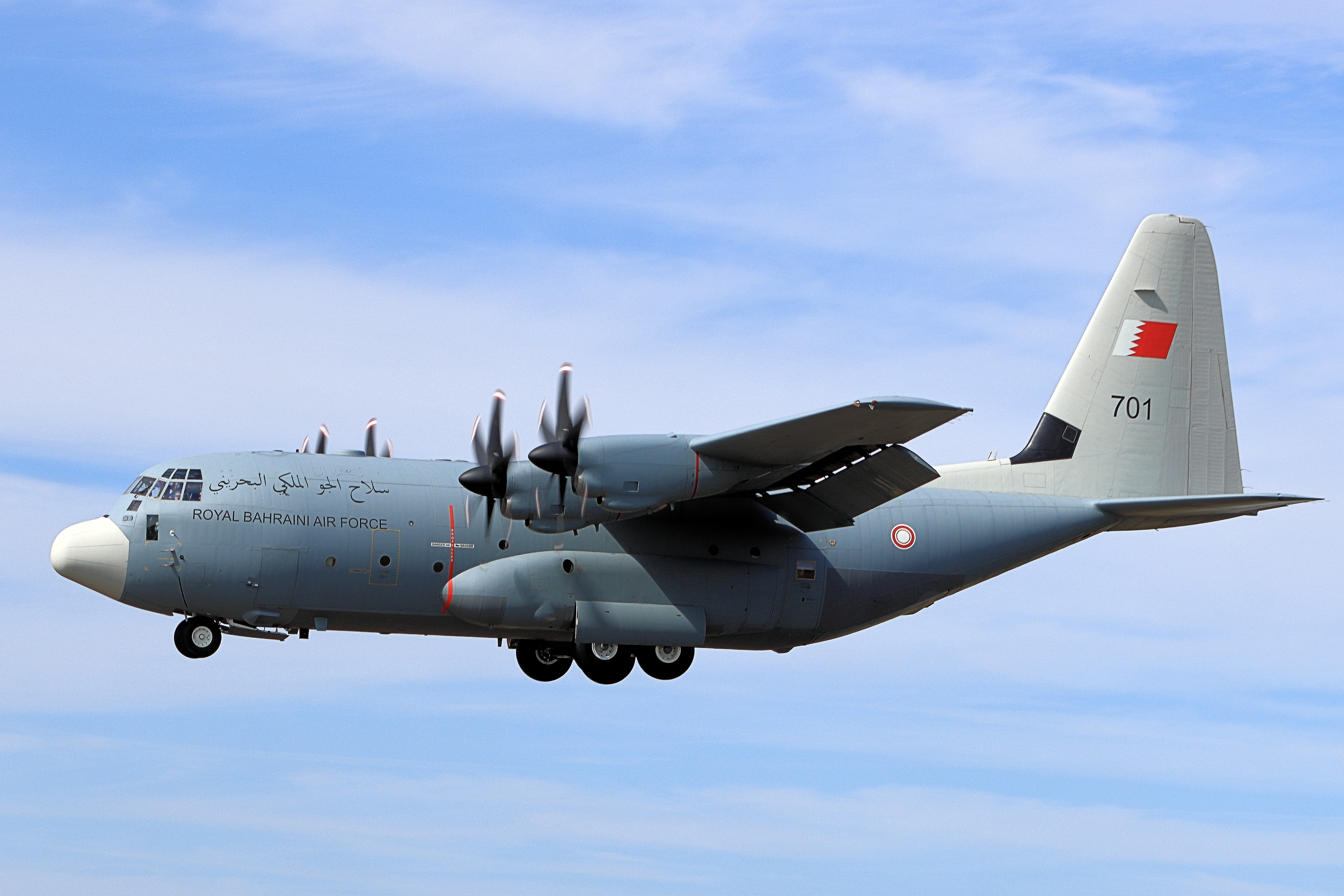
A Bahraini C-130J over RIAT, 2022

In July 2000, Bahrain signed a deal with BAE Systems to establish a pilot academy based around the Hawk Trainer, similar to the NFTC in Canada. Subsequently, orders were placed for Slingsby T67 Firefly and BAE Hawk trainers. The first trainers were delivered in October 2006.

After Bahrain became a constitutional monarchy on 14 February 2002, the BAAF was renamed the Royal Bahraini Air Force (RBAF).

Upgrade of the helicopter force has included new utility transports, and on 19 June 2007, Bahrain signed a letter of offer and acceptance for nine UH-60M Black Hawk helicopters to be purchased as part of the Foreign Military Sales program through the United States Army. These are designated for use in a variety of roles, including combat search and rescue. They were the international launch customer for the UH-60M variant of the venerable S-70 helicopter family. Deliveries commenced on 1 December 2009.

A single Sikorsky S-92 VVIP helicopter was purchased by the Air Force in 2007 and placed in service with the Bahrain Royal Flight.

Bahrain would again engage in combat operations as part of the Saudi Arabia-led Operation Decisive Storm, operating from bases in Saudi Arabia against Houthi rebel forces in Yemen during March and April 2015. Initially, fifteen F-16 aircraft were deployed as the RBAF contribution to combat forces in the operation. Bahrain's forces remained in Saudi Arabia in assistance of the coalition through 2015. An RBAF F-16 was lost when it crashed after a technical problem in December 2015. The Bahraini Air Force ended its participation in the operation in Yemen in February 2016.

In 2018, Lockheed Martin was awarded a $1.1 billion contract to produce 16 F-16 Viper Block 70 fighter aircraft for Bahrain, the U.S. Department of Defense said in a release.

Work under the $1,124,545,002 fixed-price-incentive-firm contract is expected to be complete by 30 September 2023, the Friday, 22 June release said.

In October, the government of Bahrain announced that it had finalized a $3.8 billion deal with Lockheed for the F-16 purchase. Bahrain Royal Air Force commander Major General Shaikh Hamad bin Abdullah Al Khalifa said the Gulf state hoped the first planes will be delivered in 2021.

The sale of F-16 Vipers and related equipment to Bahrain was first approved by the U.S. State Department in 2016 during the Obama administration but it was delayed over human rights concerns. President Donald Trump dropped the human rights conditions last year.

The State Department then approved the sale of 19 aircraft worth $2.78 billion, and another $1.1 billion to upgrade Bahrain's existing fleet of 20 F-16s to the Viper configuration in September 2017. The proposed sales also include additional equipment and support. Hamid said in October that the purchase of the other three aircraft was still a possibility.

In December 2025, the United States State Department approved a $445 million Foreign Military Sale (FMS) to provide sustainment, support equipment, and spare parts for the Royal Bahraini Air Force's F-16 fleet. Managed primarily by General Electric and Lockheed Martin, the deal expands upon a prior $47 million agreement to enhance aircraft maintenance, radar components, and weapons system support aimed at bolstering regional interoperability with U.S. and allied forces.

During the 2026 Iran war, the RBAF intercepted Iranian missiles and drones launched at Bahrain. On 1 April 2026, an RBAF F-16 Block 70 shot down two Iranian drones after they got past ground-based air defenses, becoming the first air-to-air kills of the Block 70.

=== Incidents and accidents ===
- 27 September 2003: F-16C Block 40 Fighting Falcon (s/n RBAF 204; c/n AC-12) crashed in the Persian Gulf, 75 km (47 mi) north of Bahrain. This was the first F-16 loss for Bahrain and attributed to the pilot becoming disoriented during maneuvers.
- 30 December 2015: An F-16 Fighting Falcon crashed in Jizan Province, Saudi Arabia while supporting the Saudi Arabian-led intervention in Yemen. The pilot was recovered safely and the crash was attributed to technical issues.

== Organization ==
=== Structure ===
Squadron	Wing	Aircraft	Base	Ref
1st Tactical Fighter Squadron	Fighter Wing	F-16C/D	Isa Air Base	
2nd Tactical Fighter Squadron	Fighter Wing	F-16C	Isa Air Base	
3rd Helicopter Squadron	Helicopter Wing	AB 212, UH-60M	Riffa Air Base	
4th Squadron	Training Wing	T67M260	Isa Air Base	
5th Squadron	Training Wing	Hawk 129	Isa Air Base	
6th Tactical Fighter Squadron	Fighter Wing	F-5E/F	Isa Air Base	
7th Transport Squadron	Transport Wing	C-130J	Sakhir Air Base	
8th Helicopter Squadron	Helicopter Wing	AH-1E, TAH-1P	Riffa Air Base	
9th Helicopter Squadron	Helicopter Wing	AH-1E, TAH-1P	Riffa Air Base	
10th Helicopter Squadron	Helicopter Wing	Bo 105C	Riffa Air Base	
19th Helicopter Squadron	Helicopter Wing	AH-1Z	Riffa Air Base	

=== Bases ===
Base	Location	Runway	Units
Isa Air Base	9.7 kilometres (6.0 mi) south of Jaww, Southern Governorate	1 × 3,800 metres (12,500 ft) concrete	Fighter Wing; Training Wing; 379th Air Expeditionary Wing (USAF)
Sakhir Air Base	1 kilometre (0.62 mi) east of Zallaq, Southern Governorate	1 × 3,200 metres (10,500 ft) paved 2 x helipad	Bahrain Amiri Royal Flight
Riffa Air Base	3.2 kilometres (2.0 mi) south east of Riffa, Southern Governorate	1 × 175 metres (574 ft) multiple helipads	Helicopter Wing
Muharraq Air Base	Bahrain International Airport, Muharraq	1 × 3,956 metres (12,979 ft) asphalt	Aviation Support Unit Bahrain (USN) former Royal Air Force station

== Aircraft ==
=== Current inventory ===
Aircraft	Origin	Type	Variant	In service	Notes
Combat aircraft
Lockheed Martin F-16 Fighting Falcon	United States	Multirole combat aircraft	F-16V Viper	16	
General Dynamics F-16 Fighting Falcon	United States	Multirole combat aircraft	F-16C/D	20	
Transport
Cessna 208	United States	Transport Utility		1	
C-130J Super Hercules	United States	Tactical airlifter	C-130J-30	2	Former RAF aircraft
Helicopters
Bell 212	United States	Utility helicopter	Bell 212/412	22	
Bell 505	United States / Canada	Utility helicopter		3	
Sikorsky UH-60	United States	Utility helicopter	UH-60M	8	
Bell AH-1Z Viper	United States	Attack helicopter		12	
Bell AH-1 Cobra	United States	Attack helicopter	Bell AH-1E/F FB	22	
Trainer aircraft
T67 Firefly	United Kingdom	Basic trainer		3	
BAE Hawk	United Kingdom	Jet trainer	Hawk 129	6	
Northrop F-5	United States	Trainer aircraft	F-5E/F	12	
F-16 Fighting Falcon	United States	Trainer aircraft	F-16D	4	
MBB Bo 105	Germany	Trainer / Utility helicopter		4	
Bell AH-1 Cobra	United States	Trainer helicopter	AH-1P	8	

== Personnel ==
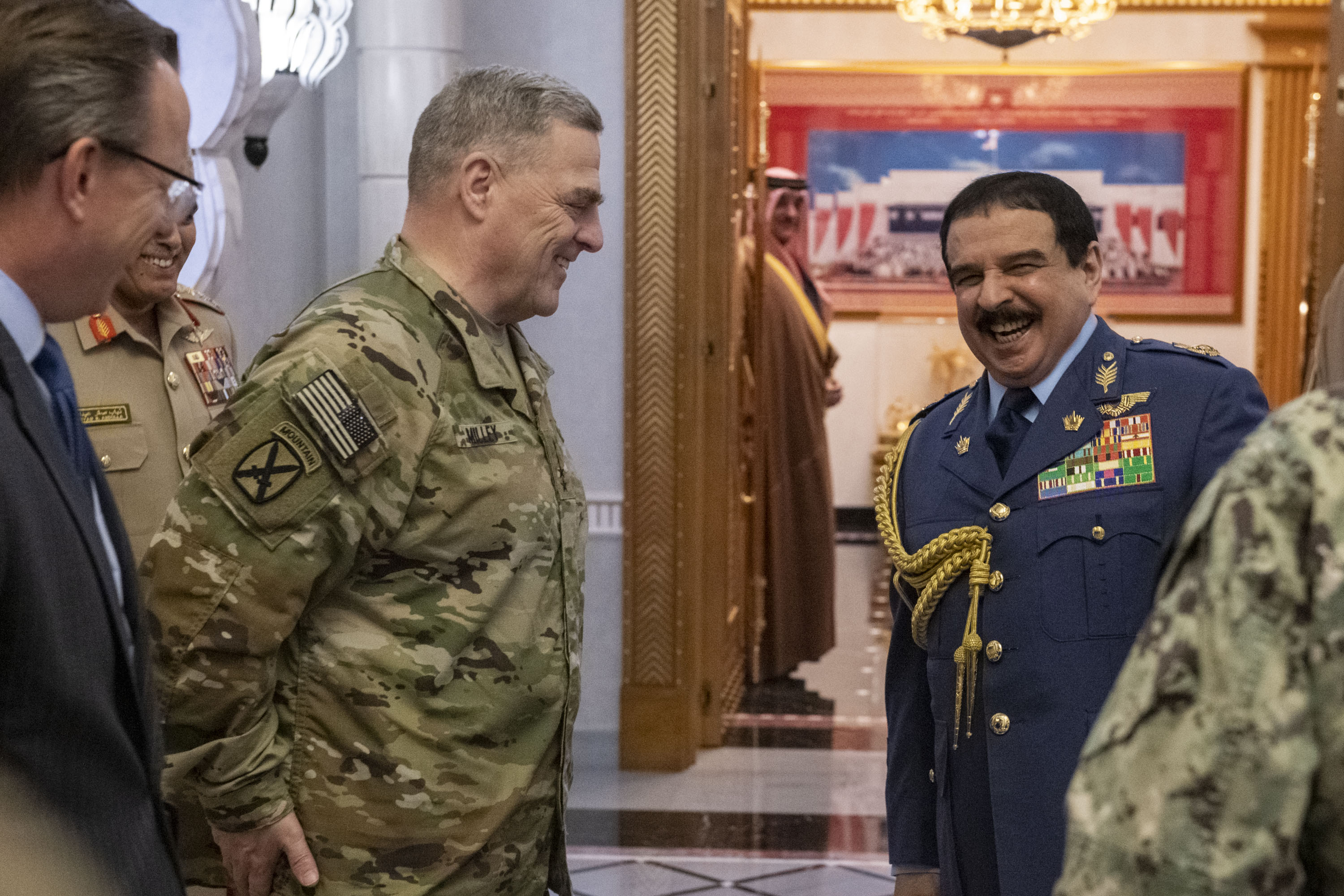
King Hamad bin Isa Al Khalifa in a Royal Bahraini Air Force uniform

The personnel of the RBAF are trained at the Royal Bahraini Air Force Technical Institute and the Training Wing. Every year a number of Bahraini officers are sent to receive additional training with the United States Air Force, which can include the Air University's Squadron Officer School, the Air Command and Staff College, or the Air War College. The RBAF also takes part in training exercises with other air forces of the Gulf Cooperation Council.

The air force had 650 personnel in 1992 and 1,500 in 2009.

=== Rank insignia ===
Officer ranks

Rank group	General / flag officers					Senior officers			Junior officers
Royal Bahraini Air Force
Royal Bahraini Air Force	مشیر; Mushir	فريق أول; Fariq 'awal	فريق; Fariq	لواء; Liwa	عميد; Amid	عقيد; Aqid	مقدم; Muqaddam	رائد; Ra'id	نقيب; Naqib	ملازم أول; Mulazim awwal	ملازم; Mulazim

Enlisted and NCO ranks

Rank group	Senior NCOs		Junior NCOs	Enlisted
Royal Bahraini Air Force					No insignia
Royal Bahraini Air Force	رقیب أول; Raqib 'awal	رقیب; Raqib	عريف; Earif	جندي أول; Jundiun awwal	جندي; Jundiun

== Future ==
Bahrain is planning to recapitalize its fighter fleet. Replacement of the F-5 fleet is to be accomplished with additional F-16 orders in the near term, while longer-term plans call for a more capable aircraft to be acquired to add to or replace the F-16 fleet. Bahrain is considering buying the Eurofighter Typhoon, the JAS 39 Gripen, the Dassault Rafale, or the F-35 Lightning II. The British government is in early talks with Bahrain over a potential order for the Eurofighter Typhoon fighter. In September 2016 it was announced that the sale of up to 19 further F-16s had been submitted to the US Congress for approval, however the White House later advised that it would not complete the approval unless it showed progress on human rights issues arising from the Bahraini protests of 2011. In September 2017, the United States Defense Security Cooperation Agency approved the sale of up to 22 F-16 Block 70/72 aircraft, as well as the sale of 20 upgrade kits to upgrade Bahrain's existing F-16 fleet to the F-16V Viper variant, the most advanced variant of the F-16, featuring the AN/APG-83 active electronically scanned array radar, a new mission computer developed by Raytheon, modern cockpit displays and other electronics upgrades. In October 2017, Bahraini officials announced that Bahrain had signed a deal worth $3.8 billion with Lockheed Martin for upgraded F-16s, as well as upgrade kits for the Air Force's existing F-16 fleet.

Bahrain has confirmed its order for 12 Bell AH-1Z Viper, six months after the US Department of State approved the deal, worth an estimated $912 million, under the Foreign Military Sales process. The attack helicopters will be delivered from the second half of 2022.

Helicopters Enhance Training Proficiency of Royal Bahrain Air Force. Bell Textron Inc., a Textron Inc. (NYSE: TXT) company, announced the delivery of 3 Bell 505 helicopters to the Royal Bahrain Air Force. Bell delivered the aircraft during an inspection and acceptance event in February 2023 at Bell's Mirabel facility.

In March 2023, Bahrain has requested the purchase of 24 surplus Bell AH-1W Super Cobra attack helicopters from the US, via a Foreign Military Sales deal worth an estimated US$350 million.
