= RQS =

RQS may refer to:

== Rescue squadrons ==
- List of United States Air Force rescue squadrons § Rescue Squadrons (RQS)
- State National Guards
  - 101st Rescue Squadron, New York Air National Guard
  - 103d Rescue Squadron, New York Air National Guard
  - 129th Rescue Squadron, California Air National Guard
  - 130th Rescue Squadron, California Air National Guard
  - 131st Rescue Squadron, California Air National Guard
  - 210th Rescue Squadron, Alaska Air National Guard
  - 211th Rescue Squadron, Alaska Air National Guard
  - 212th Rescue Squadron, Alaska Air National Guard

== Other ==
- Regional Qualifying Score, in U.S. NCAA Women's Collegiate Gymnastics; see 2016 NCAA Women's Gymnastics Championship § Regional Championships
- Raytown C-2 School District, or Raytown Quality Schools, Raytown, Missouri

== See also ==
- RQ (disambiguation)
