= 131st Rescue Squadron =

California Air National Guard unit

131st Rescue Squadron

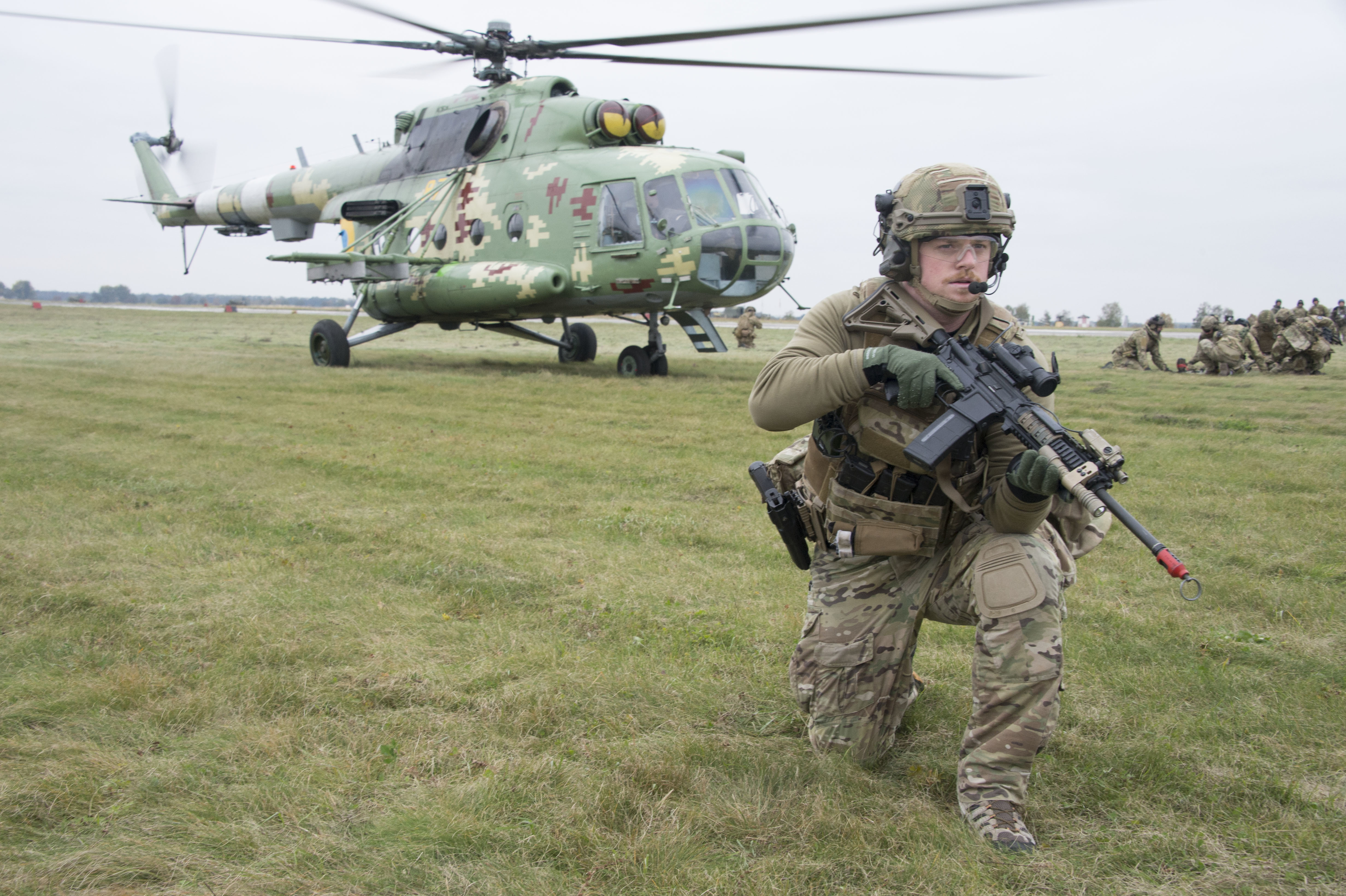
- Pararescuemen from the 131st Rescue Squadron train at Vinnytsia Air Base as part of Clear Sky 2018.
- Active: 2003–present
- Country: United States
- Allegiance: California
- Branch: Air National Guard
- Type: Squadron
- Role: Combat search and rescue and special operations
- Part of: California Air National Guard
- Garrison/HQ: Moffett Federal Airfield, California
- Motto: Servatores taciturni (Latin for 'Saviors in Silence')
- Engagements: Operation Iraqi Freedom, Operation Enduring Freedom

Insignia
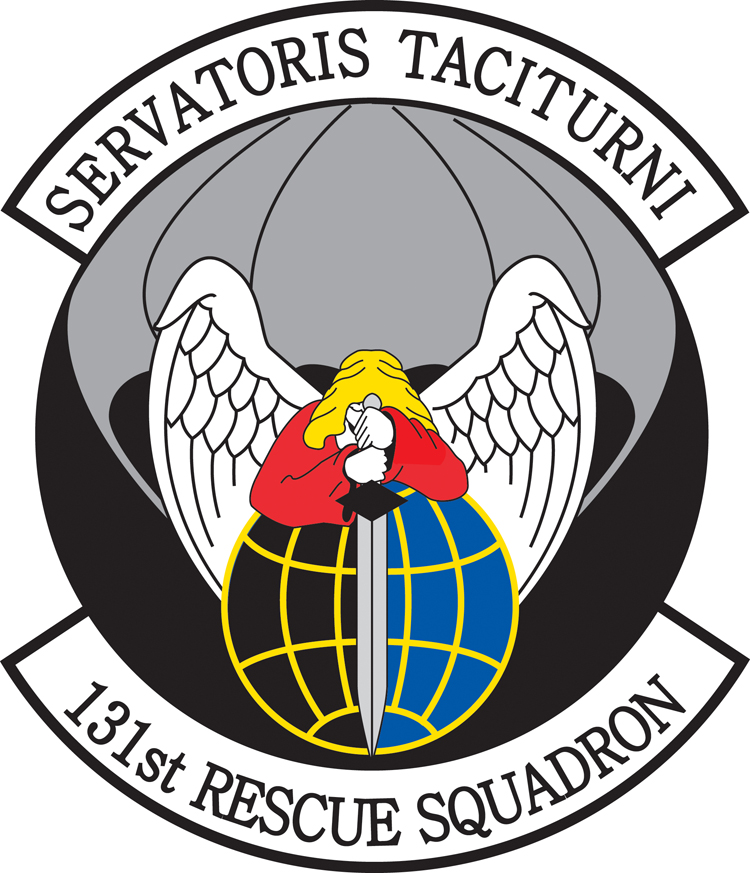
- 131st Rescue Squadron emblem

The 131st Rescue Squadron is a unit of the California Air National Guard 129th Rescue Wing located at Moffett Federal Airfield, California. It was established in 2003 when the Air Force split Air National Guard rescue squadrons into separate elements. The squadron consists of Pararescuemen, Combat Rescue Officers and support personnel utilizing the helicopter and transport assets of the 129th Rescue Wing.

== Mission ==
When in a theater of combat, squadron members operate at the direction of thel theater combatant commander and the theater's commander of air forces. In these situations, the 131st is primarily assigned to conduct personnel recovery operations, including rescuing downed airmen or other isolated personnel from enemy territory. In addition to combat search and rescue, the 130th may also conduct collateral missions such as noncombatant evacuation operations and support of special operations forces.

At its home station, the squadron furnishes personnel to respond to state emergencies, such as natural disasters, and assists civil authorities in the enforcement of the law. Other 131st missions include non-combat search and rescue, emergency aeromedical evacuations, humanitarian relief, international aid, counter-drug activities, and support for NASA flight operations.

== History ==
The unit was organized at Moffett Federal Airfield, California on 1 October 2003 as part of a reorganization of Air National Guard rescue units which created separate squadrons for the fixed-wing, helicopter, and pararescue elements of the 129th Rescue Squadron. The Sikorsky HH-60 Pave Hawk helicopter flight became the 129th Rescue Squadron; the Lockheed HC-130 Hercules flight become the 130th Rescue Squadron, and the pararescue flight became the 131st Rescue Squadron. All three rescue squadrons are assigned to the 129th Operations Group.

The 131st has supported Operation Iraqi Freedom in Iraq and Operation Enduring Freedom in Afghanistan to support the global war on terrorism. It has participated in exercises with troops form friendly nations, including Denmark and Ukraine.

== Lineage ==
- Constituted as the 131st Rescue Squadron and allotted to the Air National Guard in 2003

Extended federal recognition and activated on 1 October 2003

=== Assignments ===
- 129th Operations Group, 1 October 2003 – present

=== Stations ===
- Moffett Federal Airfield, California, 1 October 2003 – present
