= 129th Rescue Wing =

129th Rescue Wing

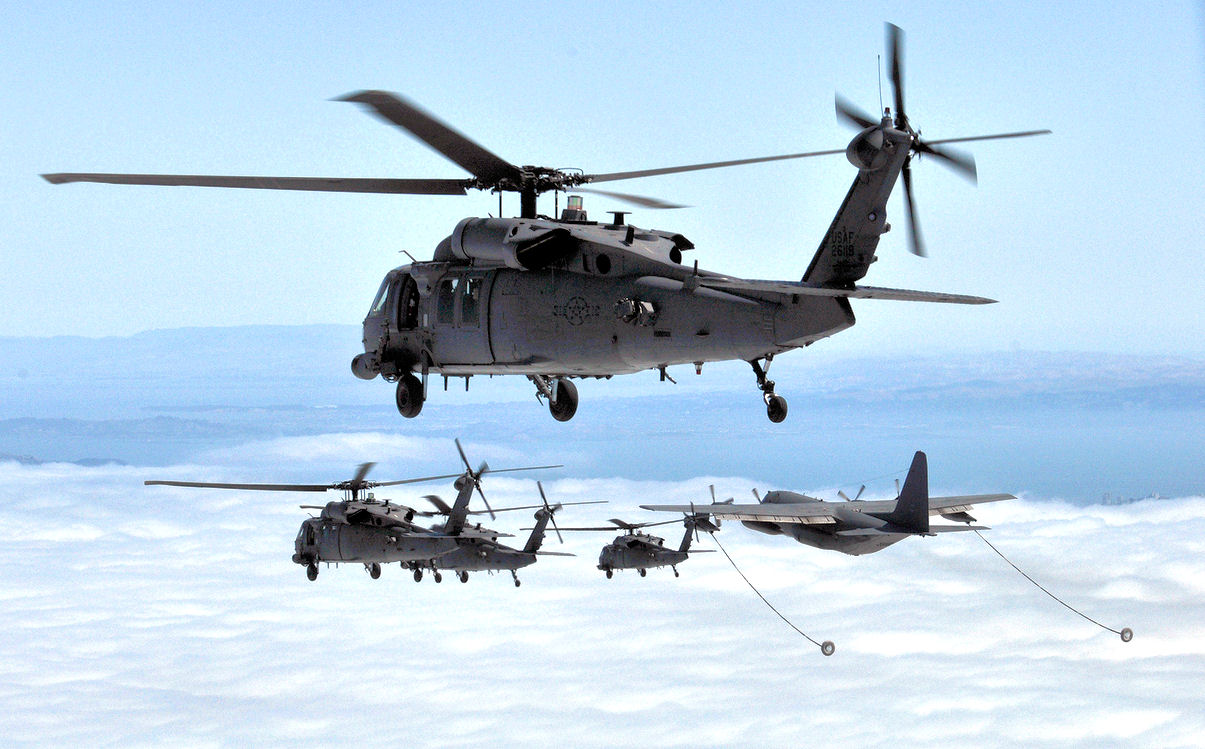
- Members of the 129th Rescue Wing in HH-60G Pave Hawks and HC-130J Combat King II's conduct aircraft formation training over Northern California.
- Active: 1955–1958; 1962–present
- Country: United States
- Allegiance: California
- Branch: Air National Guard
- Type: Wing
- Role: Search and Rescue
- Part of: California Air National Guard
- Garrison/HQ: Moffett Federal Airfield, California
- Mottos: In Pace et Bello, Noctem et Diem (Latin for 'In Peace & War, During Night & Day')
- Decorations: Air Force Outstanding Unit Award

Commanders
- Wing Commander: Colonel Thomas W. Keegan
- Vice Commander: Colonel Roshan M. Jessani
- Command Chief Master Sergeant: Chief Master Sergeant Sally Ford

Insignia
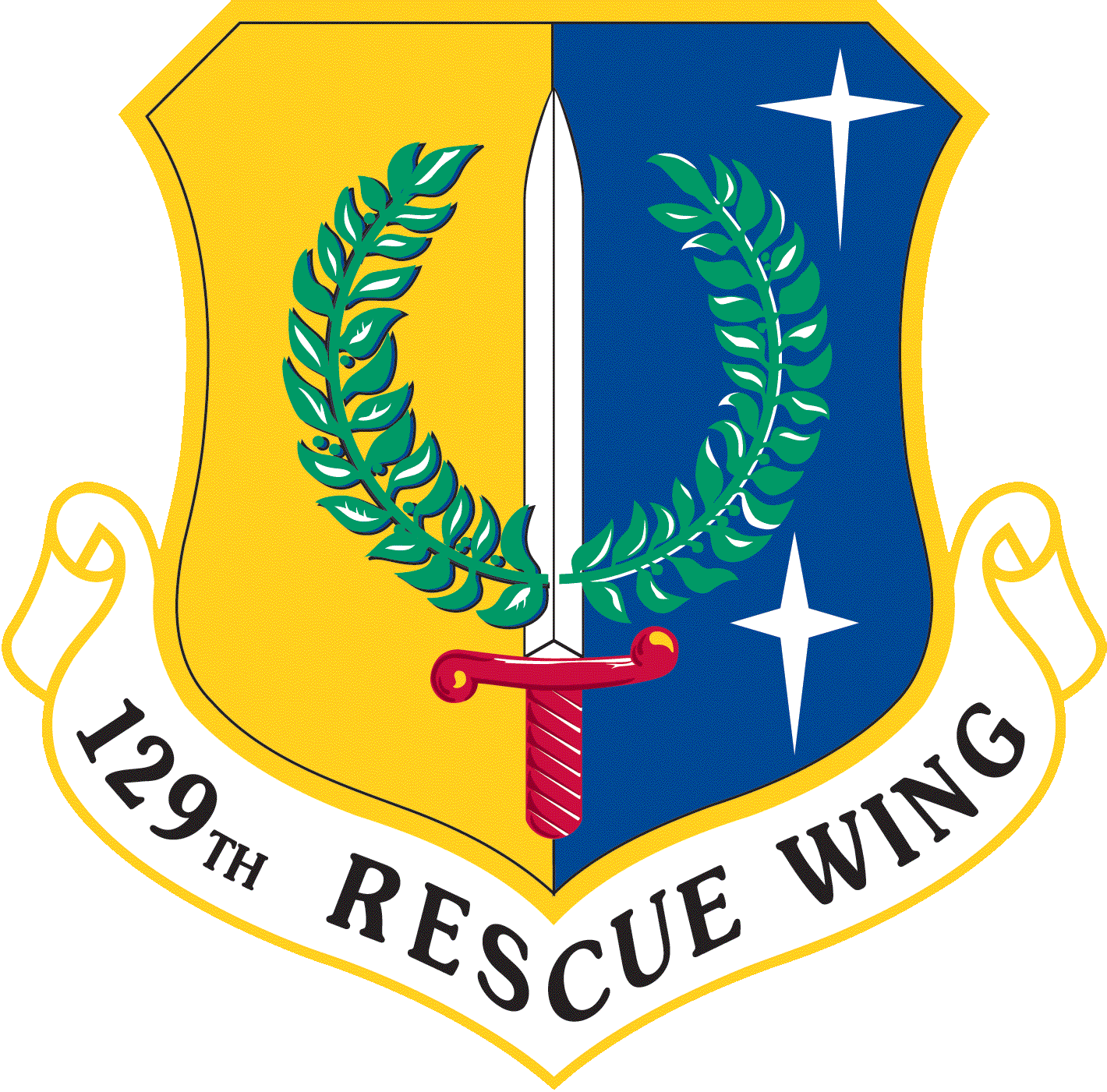
- 129th Rescue Wing emblem (Note: The Air Force shield is bordered by a white, a gold and blue background with two elongated stars in the blue field. A silver braid sword with red handle and hand protector divides the gold and blue fields. Superimposed over the sword and both fields is an olive wreath in green. The unit name is in blue on a white scroll. The emblem bears the colors of deep blue and gold for the United States Air Force and the colors red, white and blue for the United States of America. The sword symbolizes strength in war; the wreath symbolizes the peacetime mission. The deep blue field with the two stars and the gold field signify the nighttime and daytime environments in which the wing operates.)

Aircraft flown
- Helicopter: Sikorsky HH-60W Jolly Green II
- Transport: HC-130J Combat King II

The 129th Rescue Wing is a unit of the California Air National Guard, stationed at Moffett Federal Airfield in Sunnyvale, California. The wing is equipped with the HC-130J Combat King II and the HH-60W Jolly Green II helicopter. If activated to federal service, the wing is assigned to the United States Air Force's Air Combat Command (ACC).

== Mission ==
Located in the heart of Silicon Valley, the 129th Rescue Wing's mission is to train and prepare to perform its wartime mission of combat search and rescue anywhere in the world. The unit also works closely with the Coast Guard and various civil agencies on state missions. Equipped with HC-130J Combat King II variants of the C-130 Hercules, HH-60W Jolly Green II rescue helicopters, and the Guardian Angel Weapon System (GAWS), the 129th has performed a wide variety of civilian search and rescue missions, including distressed persons aboard ships, lost or injured hikers, and medical evacuations.

The primary mission is to prepare for wartime taskings as specified by applicable gaining commands. The peacetime mission is under the control of the Governor of California. Upon mobilization, the primary specified mission is combat search and rescue (CSAR). When directed by the California State Office of Emergency Services (OES) and/or the Department of Defense (DoD), the mission is to provide disaster relief support as required. This includes search and rescue (SAR) assistance to civil authorities, to include International Civil Aeronautics Organization (ICAO) signatories, and foreign governments.

Federal Mission (United States Air Force): Train, prepare and conduct worldwide combat search and rescue operations, over land or water, in both hostile and permissive environments. The 129th Rescue Wing also provides Agile Combat Support capabilities to Combatant Commanders.

State Mission (California Air National Guard): Support the Governor's office during state emergencies and contingencies by providing a wide range of capabilities, to include specialized search/rescue, aerial fire-fighting and Counter-Drug.

== Units ==
- 129th Operations Group (129 OG)

129th Rescue Squadron (129 RQS) HH-60W Jolly Green II
130th Rescue Squadron (130 RQS) HC-130J Combat King II
131st Rescue Squadron (131 RQS) Pararescue

- 129th Maintenance Group (129 MXG)
  - 129th Aircraft Maintenance Squadron (129 AMXS)
  - 129th Maintenance Squadron (129 MXS)
- 129th Mission Support Group (129 MSG)
  - 129th Security Forces Squadron (SFS)
  - 129th Logistics Readiness Squadron (LRS)
  - 129th Communications Squadron (CS)
  - 129th Force Support Flight (FSF)
  - 129th Civil Engineering Flight (CEF)
- 129th Medical Group (129 MDG)

== History ==
Formed on 3 April 1955 as the 129th Air Resupply Group by the California Air National Guard. The 129th was a new organization with no prior history or lineage. It was granted recognition by the National Guard Bureau and was stationed at Hayward Airport, California.

=== Special operations ===
The 129th ARG was initially assigned to the Military Air Transport Service. It was designated at the time as a "Psychological Warfare" unit which supported USAF unconventional warfare (guerrilla warfare), direct action (commando-type raids), strategic reconnaissance (intelligence gathering), and PSYWAR operations. Later in 1955, control was transferred to Fourth Air Force, Continental Air Command. The unit's mission was airlift of personnel and material using C-46 and SA-16 aircraft. In 1958, control was transferred to Eighteenth Air Force, Tactical Air Command with the mission remaining the same.

In 1963 the first major mission change for the 129th occurred. Situations around the world produced a need for specialized units which could insert a small group of trained combat troops on land or sea anywhere at a moment's notice. The 129th was tasked as one of the representatives of the National Guard in the Air Force's Air Commando Group structure. The C-46 was replaced with Helio U-10A and U-10D Couriers. During a three-year period starting in 1965, the U-10s belonging to the 143d and other Air National Guard units were transferred back to the Air Force for use in South Vietnam, during which the "Helio" was replaced by DeHavilland U-6 "Beavers". The 129th later acquired C-119 Flying Boxcars and was renamed the Special Operations Group.

=== Aerospace Rescue and Recovery ===
In April 1975, the 129th received a new mission, designation and Air Force Command. Shortly afterward, the Wing also changed aircraft and commenced changing operating bases. The 129th's name became the 129th Aerospace Rescue and Recovery Group (129 ARRG) and it commenced an incremental relocation / programmed move in 1975 to what was then Naval Air Station Moffett Field, California as a tenant command, totally completing said move by 1984. In October 1989, the 129 ARGG was designated as the 129th Air Rescue Group (ARG). Operations began to convert from HH-3E Jolly Green Giant helicopter to the HH-60G Pave Hawk helicopter. The conversion was complete in 1991.

Though the mission of search and rescue has continued, the Group has continued to reflect reorganizations within the USAF. In March 1992, the name of the 129th Air Rescue Group was shortened to simply 129th Rescue Group (129 RQG) and in June 1992, it became the 129th Rescue Wing (129 RQW). Following the closure of NAS Moffett Field due to BRAC action in 1994 and its transfer from the U.S. Navy to the National Aeronautics and Space Administration (NASA) as Moffett Federal Airfield, the 129th remained at Moffett as a tenant command. In April 1997, Air Combat Command evaluated the 129th Rescue Wing's war capability as an overall Excellent during its Operational Readiness Inspection. Today, the 129th Rescue Wing continues its search and rescue operations on a global scale.

The motto of the 129th Rescue Wing, "That Others May Live", refers to the primary mission of the wing – to save lives. The members of the 129th have performed rescues under a variety of conditions – from rough Pacific seas to the rugged Sierra Nevada, using its combination of MC-130 tankers and HH-60 helicopters. Many high-risk lifesaving missions involved long-range, over-water flights, air refueling of helicopters by the HC-130 aircraft, and skilled maneuvering by ships and helicopters to recover patients from the decks of these vessels. On 3 September 1991, the 129th recovered a sailor from the merchant ship White Mana, the Group's 200th "save". Since its designation as a rescue unit in 1975, the 129th has directly saved the lives of 300 people

In 1990, the 129th began supporting U.S. Customs in the seizure of illegal drugs, as well as illegal animal and plant products, during cargo inspections. The unit has performed a number of humanitarian missions to foreign countries. From 1989 to 1991, the 129th deployed to sites in South America to assist in constructing hospital and school facilities.

During Desert Shield/Storm in 1990 and 1991, the 129th deployed personnel to both overseas and stateside locations. Three pararescuemen volunteered for combat operations and teams from the 129th Medical Squadron deployed to England, Saudi Arabia and Travis AFB. Individual members of the 129th volunteered to backfill for deployed active duty members. In July 1993, 129th members deployed to Saudi Arabia and Kuwait as part of rescue force coverage for Southwest Asia.

2 July 2008, crews from the 129th Rescue Squadron were certified to perform water bucket operations, making the 129th the only rescue unit in the Air Force and Air National Guard qualified to fight fires. On 6 April 2018 the squadron received the first of four new HC-130J Combat King II aircraft.

The first Sikorsky HH-60W Jolly Green II arrived on 31 January 2025. The 129th was the last Air Force wing to operate the HH-60G until the type's retirement on 21 September 2026.

=== 129th Rescue Wing ===
The 129th has been routinely assigned to support Operations Iraqi Freedom, Enduring Freedom, Inherent Resolve and Octave Quartz

=== California state support missions ===
As an Air National Guard unit, many of the 129th's missions involved supporting the Governor's office during times of State emergencies, including earthquakes, chemical spills, fires and floods. The 129th provided aid during floods along the Yuba River in 1959 and the Eel River in 1964–1965. During record flooding in Sonoma, Sutter and Yuba counties in Northern California, 33 lives were saved in 5 days, from 18 to 22 February 1986. In all, 44 lives were saved in 1986, a record rescue for the 129th. During the aftermath of the 1989 Loma Prieta earthquake, the 129th established Command Post operations and was chosen to coordinate all military aircraft activities within the Bay Area. The 129th provided air transportation for State and Federal government officials to survey damage from the 1989 Loma Prieta earthquake and the 1991 Oakland Hills fire. The unit has also been tasked with mutual aid to state law enforcement during the 1965 Watts (Los Angeles) riots and the 1992 civil disturbance in Los Angeles.

=== Lineage ===
- Established as the 129th Air Resupply Group and allotted to the National Guard on 3 Apri 1955

Activated and extended federal recognition on 3 April 1955
Inactivated on 1 November 1958
Redesignated 129th Troop Carrier Group
Activated on 20 January 1962
Redesignated 129th Air Commando Group on 1 July 1963
Redesignated 129th Special Operations Group on 8 August 1968
Redesignated 129th Aerospace Rescue and Recovery Group on 3 May 1975
Redesignated 129th Air Rescue Group on 1 October 1989
Redesignated 129th Rescue Group on 16 March 1992
Redesignated 129th Rescue Wing on 1 October 1995

=== Assignments ===
- California Air National Guard, 3 April 1955

Gained by: Military Air Transport Service
Gained by: Fourth Air Force, Continental Air Command, 1955
Gained by: Eighteenth Air Force, Tactical Air Command, 1 November 1958
Gained by: Tactical Air Command, 1 July 1963
Gained by: Military Airlift Command, 3 May 1975
Gained by: Air Combat Command, 1 June 1992
Gained by: Air Force Special Operations Command, 1 October 2003
Gained by: Air Combat Command, 1 October 2005

=== Components ===
- 129th Operations Group, 1 October 1995 – present
- 129th Maintenance Group, 1 October 2003 – present
- 129th Air Recovery Squadron (later 129th Troop Carrier Squadron, 129th Air Commando Squadron, 129th Special Operations Squadron, 129th Aerospace Rescue & Recovery Squadron, 129th Air Rescue Squadron, 129th Rescue Squadron), 3 April 1955 – 1 November 1958, 20 January 1962 – 1 October 1995

=== Stations ===
- Hayward Municipal Airport, California, 3 April 1955
- Naval Air Station Moffett Field, California, 1980 – 1 July 1994
- Moffett Federal Airfield, 1 July 1994 – present

=== Aircraft ===
- C-46 Commando, 1955–1963
- SA-16 Albatross, 1963–1968
- C-119 Flying Boxcar, 1968–1975
- Cessna U-3A, 1968–1975
- U-6A Beaver, 1968–1975

- U-10D Super Courier, 1968–1975
- HH-3E Jolly Green Giant, 1975–1991
- HC-130P Hercules, 1980–2002
- MC-130P Combat Shadow, 2002 – 2019
- HH-60G Pave Hawk, 1991–2026
- HC-130J Combat King II, 2018–present
- HH-60W Jolly Green II, 2025-present

== Decorations ==
- Air Force Outstanding Unit Award [6]; 23 December 1964 – 17 January 1965; 1st Device, 12 June 1984 – 11 June 1986; 2nd Device, 1 April 1989 – 31 March 1991; 3rd Device, 8 June 1995 – 7 June 1997; 4th Device, 1 August 1998 – 31 July 2000; 5th Device, 1 August 2000 – 31 July 2002, 2021-2022
- Governor's (California) Outstanding Unit Citation, 1 May 1986 – 30 April 1987
- The Adjutant General's (California) Meritorious Unit Citation; 1964, 1965, 1972, 1975, 1979, 1984
- United States Coast Guard Meritorious Unit Commendation with Operational Distinguishing Device; 1 May 1981 – 1 October 1981; 1st Device, 26 February 1984 – 15 November 1985; 2nd Device, 31 January 2000 – 28 February 2000

=== Other wing awards and decorations ===
- Air National Guard Meritorious Service Award, 1972
- National Guard Bureau Meritorious Service Award, 1973
- Air Force Association (Tennessee Ernie Ford Chapter), Outstanding Organization Award, 1985
- Royal Air Force Benevolence Fund (United Kingdom) Straddling Trophy for Aircraft Concours d’Elegance Competition, International Air Tattoo '85, RAF Fairfield, England, 1985
- Military Airlift Command, Distinguished Flying Unit Award
- Air National Guard, Distinguished Flying Unit, 1987
- Chuck Yeager Aerospace Education Award, 1993
- Founders & Patriots of America, Outstanding National Guard Unit Award, April 1996, March 2001 and December 2004
- Air National Guard Association, Spaatz Trophy, 1998
- Air Force Association, Outstanding Unit Award (Outstanding ANG Unit of the Year), 1999
- Air Combat Command Flight Safety Award, 10 October 2000 – 30 September 2001
- Air Force Association, Outstanding ANG Flying Unit Award, 2002
- National Guard Bureau Excellence in Diversity Award, 2014
