= Hayward Executive Airport =

Airport in Hayward, California, United States

Hayward Executive Airport (former Hayward Army Air Field)
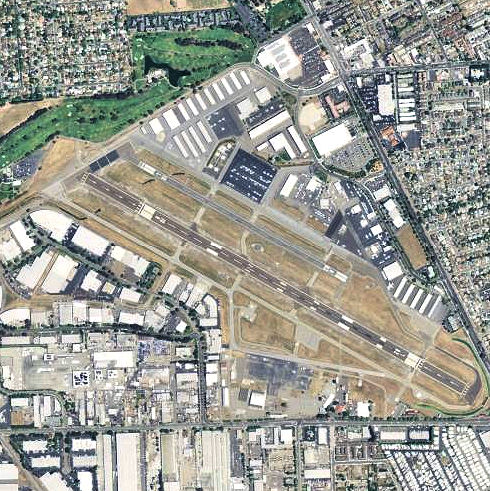
- USGS 2006 orthophoto
- IATA: HWD; ICAO: KHWD; FAA LID: HWD; WMO: 72585

Summary
- Airport type: Public
- Owner: City of Hayward
- Serves: Hayward, California
- Elevation AMSL: 52 ft (16 m)
- Coordinates: 37°39′32″N 122°07′18″W
- Website: www.hayward-ca.gov/airport

Maps
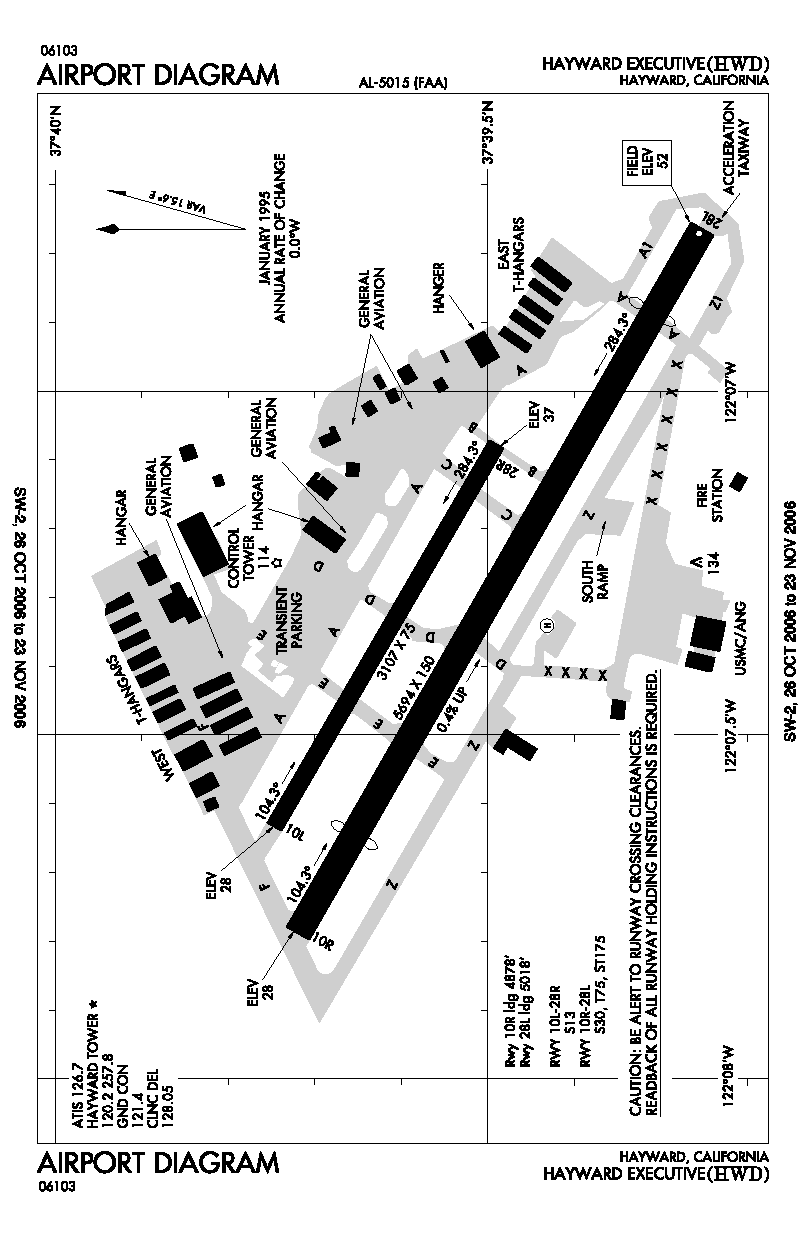
- FAA diagram

- Location within California

Runways
Direction	Length		Surface
Direction	ft	m	Surface
10R/28L	5,694	1,736	Asphalt
10L/28R	3,107	947	Asphalt

Statistics (2019)
- Aircraft operations (year ending 12/4/2019): 116,753
- Based aircraft: 446
- Source: Federal Aviation Administration

Hayward Executive Airport (IATA: HWD, ICAO: KHWD, FAA LID: HWD) is a municipal airport in Hayward, California. The National Plan of Integrated Airport Systems for 2023–2027 categorized it as a reliever airport. The towered airport near the east shore of San Francisco Bay was formerly the Hayward Air Terminal.

== History ==
The airport was built in 1942 during World War II as an auxiliary field to Chico Army Air Field and was originally Hayward Army Air Field. The primary aircraft were Lockheed P-38 Lightnings. This post may have also been named "Russell City Army Air Field" for the unincorporated area outside of the Hayward city limits where it was located. The airfield was assigned to the United States Army Air Forces Fourth Air Force.

After the war the airport was declared surplus. In April 1947 the War Assets Administration quitclaimed the airfield, comprising some 690 acres (279 ha) and related buildings and equipment, to the City of Hayward. The airfield was then renamed Hayward Municipal Airport.

The California Air National Guard moved onto land adjoining the airport in 1949. Initially it was the home of the 61st Fighter Wing which included the 194th Fighter Squadron on June 25, 1948.

The 61st Fighter Wing was re-designated as the 144th Fighter Bomber Wing on November 1, 1950. The wing also consisted of the 192nd Fighter Squadron at Reno, Nevada and the 191st Fighter Squadron at Salt Lake City, Utah.

The North American P-51D Mustang and later the P-51H were flown from 1948 until October 31, 1954. During its early years with the P-51D/H, the unit earned prominence as one of the Air Force's most respected aerial gunnery competitors. In June 1953, while still flying the P-51, the unit qualified for the first all-jet, worldwide gunnery meet. Using borrowed F-86A Sabre jets, the 144th, which represented the Air National Guard, placed fifth in competition. This unit later relocated to Fresno Air Terminal and is now the 144th Fighter Wing of the California Air National Guard at Fresno Air National Guard Base.

On April 3, 1955, the 129th Air Resupply Squadron was established at Hayward and equipped with Curtiss C-46D Commandos in the Summer 1955 supplemented by Grumman SA-16A Albatrosses in 1958. The C-46Ds were phased out 1 November 1958, and the unit was redesignated as the 129th Troop Carrier Squadron (Medium). A control tower was built in 1960 and on January 20, 1962, the unit reached Group status with federal recognition of the 129th Troop Carrier Group.

On May 1, 1980, the remaining California Air National Guard units at Hayward were reassigned to Naval Air Station Moffett Field near San Jose. Today, this unit is the 129th Rescue Wing at Moffett Federal Airfield.

== Facilities ==
The airport covers 543 acres (220 ha) at an elevation of 52 feet (16 m). It has two asphalt runways: 10R/28L is 5,694 by 150 feet (1,736 by 46 m) and 10L/28R is 3,107 by 75 feet (947 by 23 m).

In the year ending December 4, 2019, the airport had 116,753 aircraft operations, average 320 per day: 98% general aviation, 1% air taxi, <1% military, and <1% commercial. 446 aircraft were then based at the airport: 325 single-engine, 44 multi-engine, 46 jet, and 31 helicopter.

Hayward Executive Airport is home to the Northern California division of Ameriflight as of September 15, 2012.

The airport unveiled a new administrative building in October 2014. It cost $3.97 million.

== Gallery ==
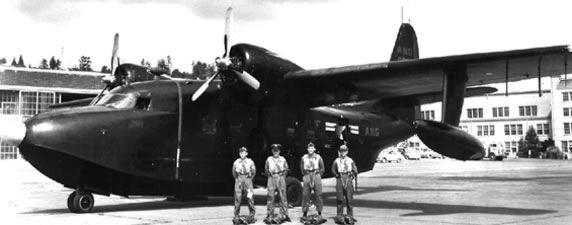
A U.S. Air Force Grumman HU-16 Albatross amphibian with its crew. The aircraft was assigned to the 129th Air Commando Group, California Air National Guard at Hayward Airport from 1963 to 1968.

Short-final on KHWD 28L

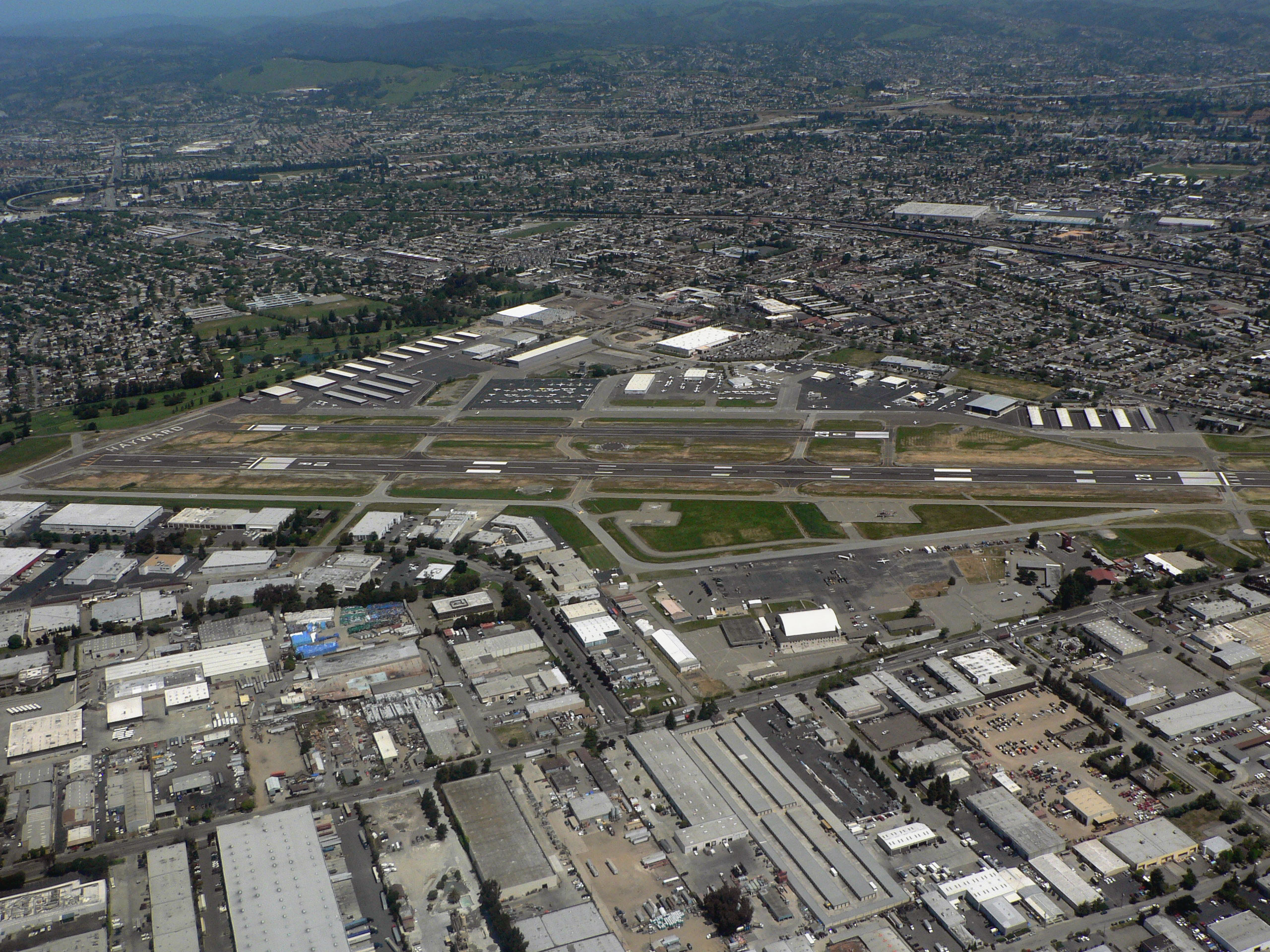
Looking northeast

== See also ==
- List of airports in the San Francisco Bay Area
- List of airports in California
- California World War II Army Airfields
