= 130 Squadron =

130 Squadron may refer to:

- 130 Squadron, a unit of the Republic of Singapore Air Force
- No. 130 Squadron RAF, a unit of the United Kingdom Royal Air Force
- 130th Airlift Squadron, a unit of the United States Air Force
- 130th Rescue Squadron, a unit of the California Air National Guard
- Electronic Attack Squadron 130, or VAQ-130, a unit of the United States Navy
