= 130th Rescue Squadron =

California Air National Guard unit

130th Rescue Squadron

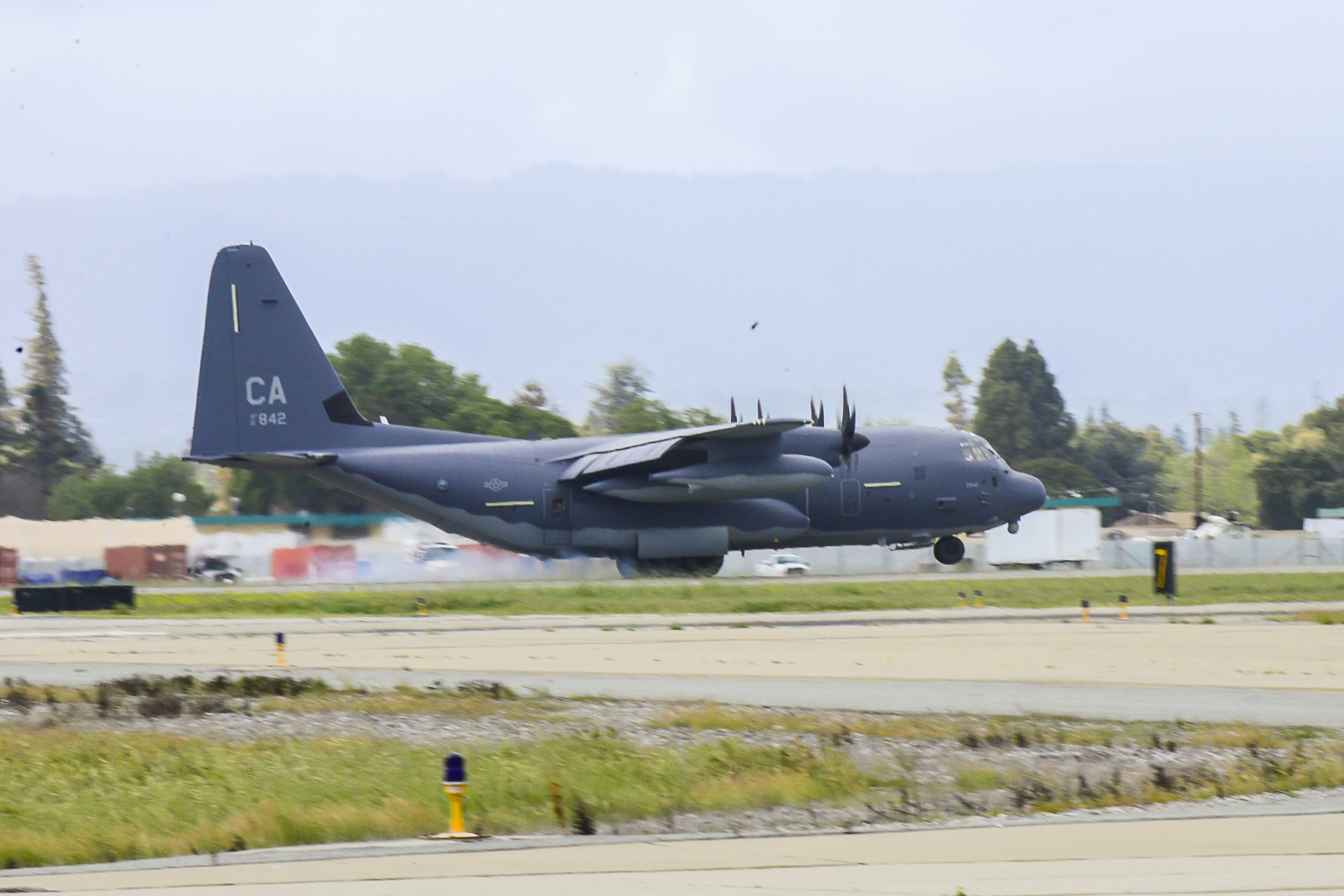
- HC-130 Combat King
- Active: 2003–present
- Country: United States
- Allegiance: California
- Branch: Air National Guard
- Type: Squadron
- Role: Combat Rescue and Personnel Recovery
- Part of: California Air National Guard
- Garrison/HQ: Moffett Federal Airfield, California
- Motto: That others may live
- Engagements: Operation Iraqi Freedom, Operation Enduring Freedom

Insignia
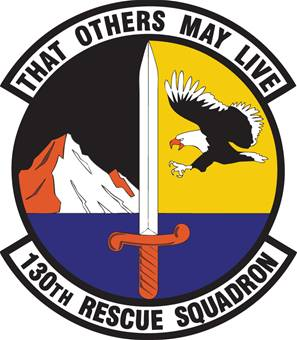
- 130th Rescue Squadron emblem

The 130th Rescue Squadron is a unit of the California Air National Guard 129th Rescue Wing located at Moffett Federal Airfield, Mountain View, California. The 130th is equipped with the HC-130J Combat King II. If activated to federal service, the 130th is gained within the United States Air Force by the Air Combat Command. The 130th flies four HC-130J Combat King IIs, a version of the C-130 specially modified for probe-and-drogue air refueling and combat search and rescue missions. These aircraft extend the range of the 129th Wing's HH-60G Pave Hawk helicopters with an air refueling capability.

== Mission ==
When in a theater of combat, squadron members operate at the direction of the overall theater combatant commander and the theater's commander of air forces. In these situations, the 130th is primarily assigned to conduct personnel recovery operations—rescuing downed airmen or other isolated personnel from enemy territory. In addition to combat search and rescue missions like these, the 130th may also conduct collateral missions such as noncombatant evacuation operations, inter- and intra-theater airlift, and support of special operations forces.

Back at home, the 130th Rescue Squadron furnishes personnel to respond to state emergencies, such as natural disasters, and to assist civil authorities in the enforcement of the law. Other 130th missions include non-combat search and rescue, emergency aeromedical evacuations, humanitarian relief, international aid, counter-drug activities, and support for NASA flight operations.

== History ==
The squadron was organized at Moffett Federal Airfield, California on 1 October 2003 as part of a reorganization of Air National Guard rescue units which created separate squadrons for fixed-wing, helicopter and pararescue elements of the 129th Rescue Squadron. The Sikorsky HH-60 Pave Hawk helicopter flight remained the 129th Rescue Squadron; the Lockheed HC-130 Hercules flight become the 130th Rescue Squadron, and the pararescue flight became the 131st Rescue Squadron. All three squadrons are assigned to the 129th Operations Group.

On 6 April 2018 the squadron received the first of four new HC-130J Combat King II aircraft.

The 130th has been assigned to support Operation Iraqi Freedom in Iraq and Operation Enduring Freedom in Afghanistan in support of the global war on terrorism.

== Lineage ==
- Constituted as the 131st Rescue Squadron and allotted to the Air National Guard in 2003

Extended federal recognition and activated on 1 October 2003

=== Assignments ===
- 129th Operations Group, 1 October 2003 – present

=== Stations ===
- Moffett Federal Airfield, California, 1 October 2003 – present

=== Aircraft ===
- HC-130J Combat King II (2003–present)
