= Coalition Against Militarism in Our Schools =

U.S. non-profit organization

The Coalition Against Militarism in Our Schools (CAMS) now called the Coalition For Alternatives to Militarism in Our Schools is a non-profit group of educators, students, parents, and community activists working against increased militarism in American public schools, formed in 2004 by some 50 of the 45,473 teachers in the Los Angeles Unified School District, California. It serves as a clearinghouse for information on militarism and the effects of the military on youth, student, and parent activism, and is compiling a web library of peace and justice lesson plans. As of 2007, the group was in 50 schools in the Los Angeles area, providing member teachers with literature, speakers, films, and books.

== Goals and activities ==
Their mission is to "inform and educate the public, especially students, parents and school personnel about the growing militarization of our schools, and to create and present positive nonviolent alternatives which promote the value of human life, justice, and equity for all persons."

=== Eliminate the JROTC and the California Cadet Corps ===
Regarding JROTC, Coalition aims "to eliminate the Junior Reserves Officer Training Corps [sic] in our High Schools and the California Cadet Corps (CACC) in our Middle Schools, along with the school community." They have reported cases of abuse by Junior Reserve Officers' Training Corps (JROTC) instructors, as well as credentialing issues, and of having students forced into JROTC due to lack of space in Physical Education classes have been noted in Los Angeles Unified Public Schools. The group claims 2006 showed a reduction in JROTC enrollment in Los Angeles, with a drop of one-third or approximately 1,500 students, suggesting part of the explanation is efforts to stop the involuntary enrollment of students into JROTC. At Roosevelt High School in the Boyle Heights section of Los Angeles, a local campaign against JROTC cut the number of cadets 43 percent in four years, with a JROTC instructor reporting a 24 percent drop in enrollment from 2003-04 to 2006-07 for the rest of the Los Angeles Unified School District.

CAMS has worked on issues involving involuntary placement of high school students in JROTC programs in Los Angeles Unified School District, student privacy issues involving military recruiters, Armed Services Vocational Aptitude Battery (ASVAB) testing, limiting military apparatus on public school campuses, and fostering student run peace clubs.

=== Limit military recruitment in schools ===
CAMS works with the local school district to ensure that the district follows its own guidelines when dealing with military recruiters. Their efforts include attempting to limit recruiter access to students during school hours, including changing policies that once allowed recruiters to regularly pull students out of class for lunch meetings.

In November 2005, ACLU of Southern California stated that they were providing assistance to CAMS to determine the scope of military recruiting efforts on public school campuses by filing a Freedom of Information Act request to all branches of the military.

CAMS is also working to eliminate Section 9528 from the federal No Child Left Behind Act. This section allows military recruiters to visit public schools and funnels student information to military recruiters.

=== Other ===
CAMS works closely with the teachers union United Teachers Los Angeles.

CAMS is currently at work on a non-military job training and placement directory for youth called Project Great Futures.

CAMS was awarded the Season of Nonviolence LA Award presented by Agape International Spiritual Center in 2005, the California Teachers Association Human Rights Award in 2006, and the Office of the Americas Lotie Wexlar Peace and Justice Award in 2006.
