= California Wing Civil Air Patrol =

Associated branches
- United States Air Force

Command staff
- Commander: Col Craig Newton
- Deputy Commander: Lt Col Shawn Lawson
- Chief of Staff: Lt Col Tammy Sturgill

Current statistics
- Cadets: 2079
- Seniors: 1979
- Total Membership: 4058
- Awards: National Commander's Unit Citation
- Website: cawg.cap.gov
- Statistics as of 22 AUG 2024

California Wing of Civil Air Patrol (CAP) is the highest echelon of Civil Air Patrol in the state of California. California Wing headquarters are located in Van Nuys, California. California Wing consists of over 3,000 cadet and adult members at over 77 locations across the state of California.

== Mission ==
California Wing performs the three missions of Civil Air Patrol: providing emergency services; offering cadet programs for youth; and providing aerospace education for both CAP members and the general public.

=== Emergency services ===
California Wing provides emergency services, including search and rescue missions, disaster relief missions, providing Air Force support, and assisting in counter-drug missions.

In March 2020, members of California Wing partnered with the American Red Cross to serve meals to children in the Los Angeles area while schools remained closed amid the COVID-19 pandemic.

=== Cadet programs ===
Youth aged 12–18 may enter a CAP cadet program. At the age of 18, they may become a senior member or stay as a cadet. Cadets that decide to stay as a cadet may continue until they become 21. The cadet program provides a 16 step program covering aerospace education, leadership training, physical fitness and moral leadership. California Wing offers an annual summer encampment for cadets to further their skills.

=== Aerospace education ===
Civil Air Patrol provides aerospace education for both volunteer CAP members and the general public. The internal education program for CAP members educates senior and cadet members; the external program for the general public is provided through workshops offered through the nation's education system.

== Organization ==
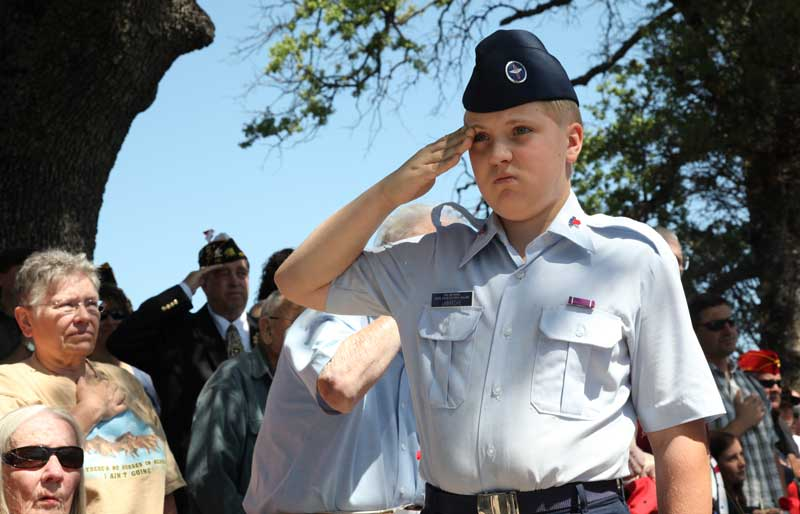
A California CAP cadet salutes the American flag.

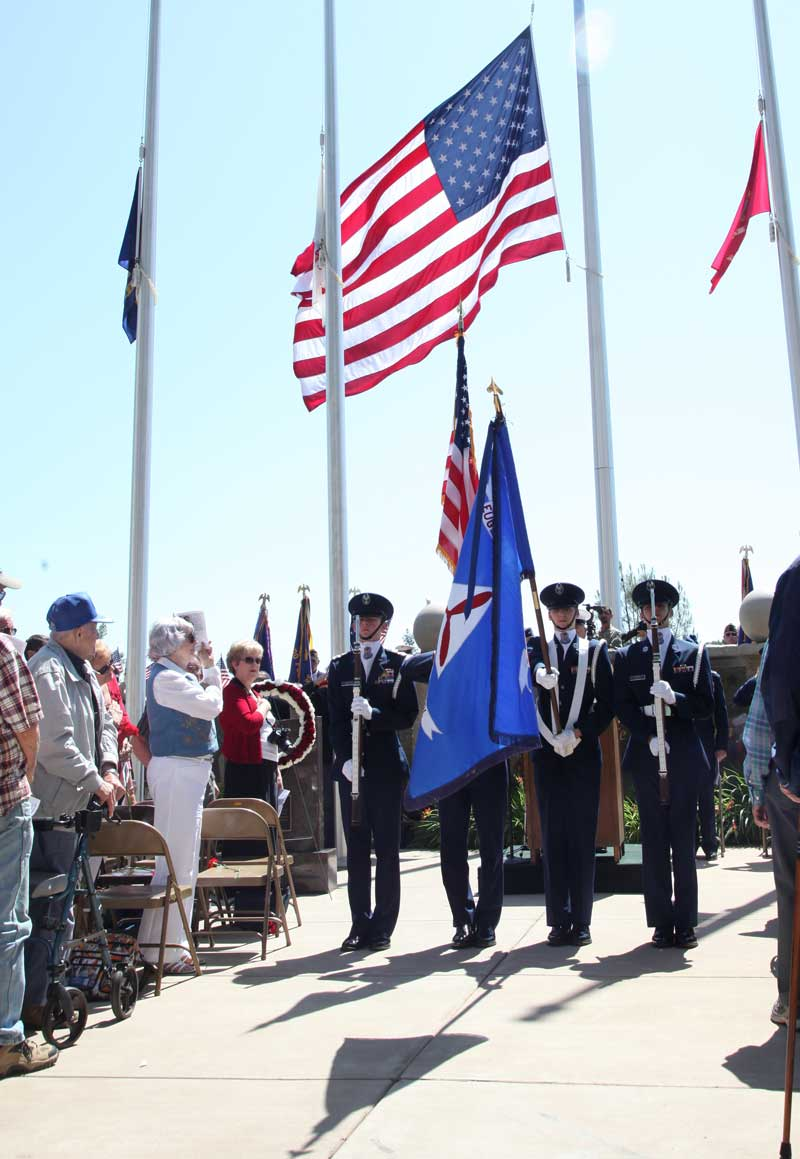
California Wing Civil Air Patrol honor guard presents the colors during the 2012 Memorial Day observance at the El Dorado County Veterans Monument in Placerville, California.

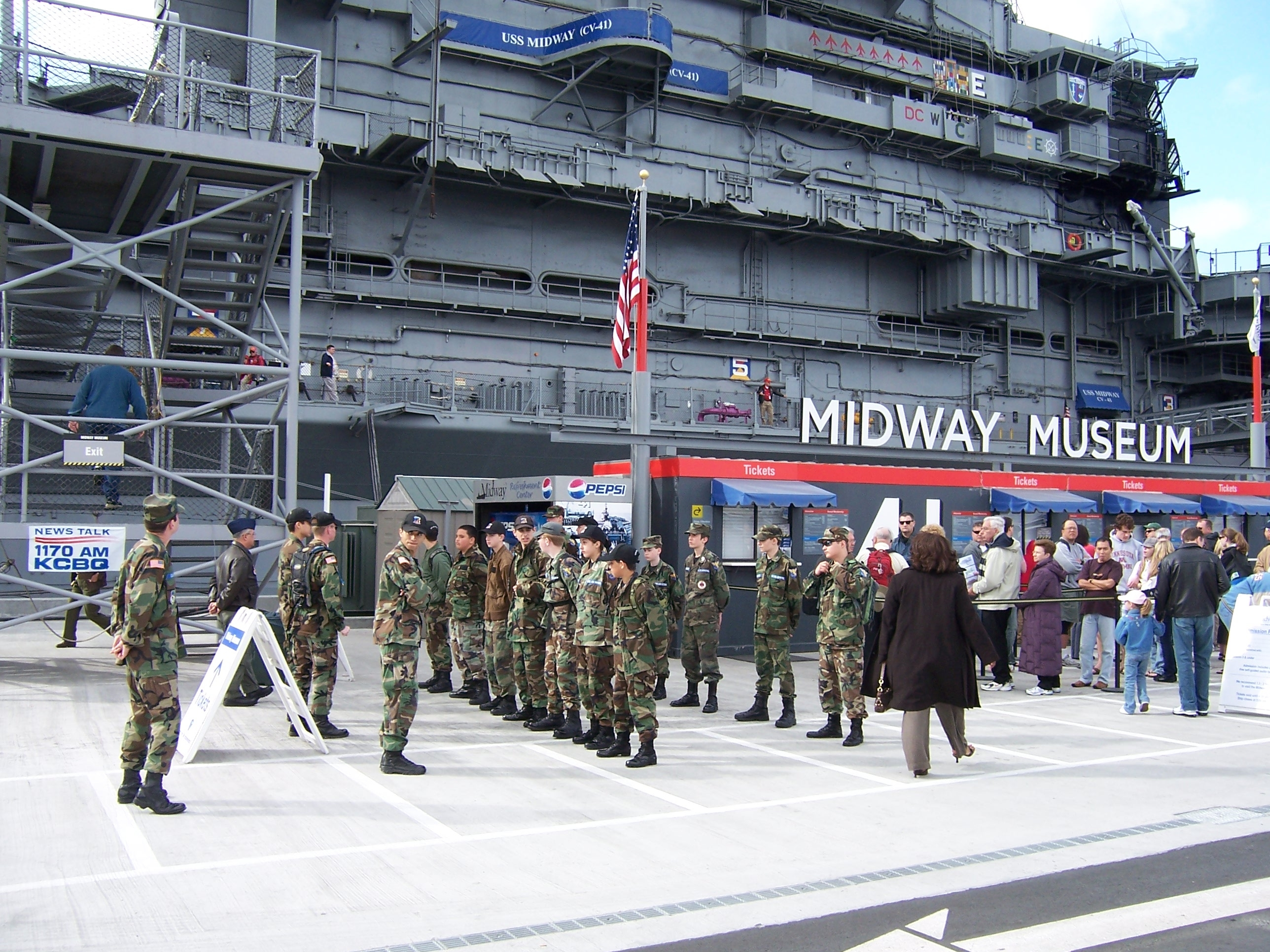
Local California Wing CAP cadets visit the USS Midway in San Diego during one of their educational trips.

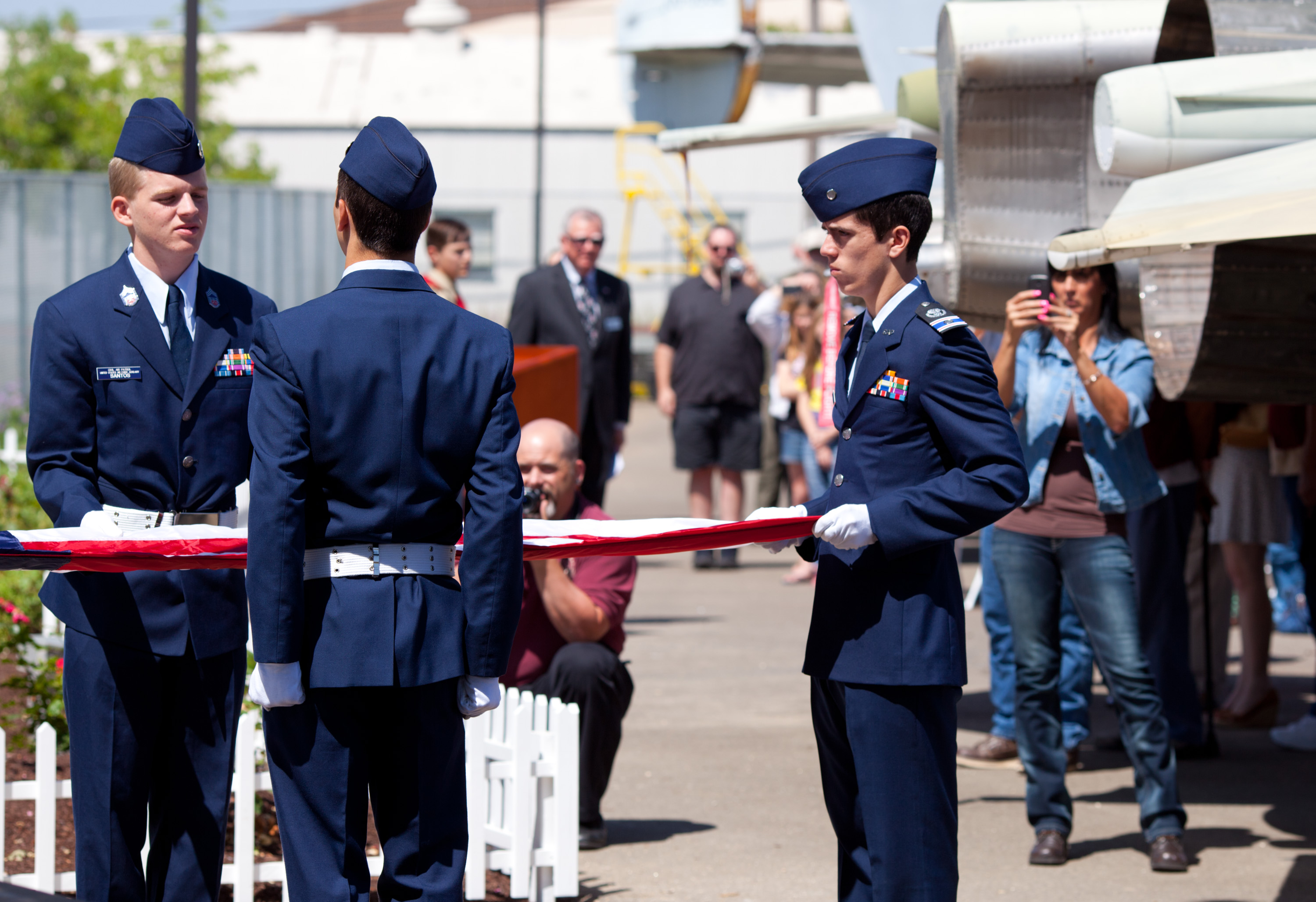
Civil Air Patrol cadets raise the Colors during an Armed Force Day celebration at the Aerospace Museum of California.

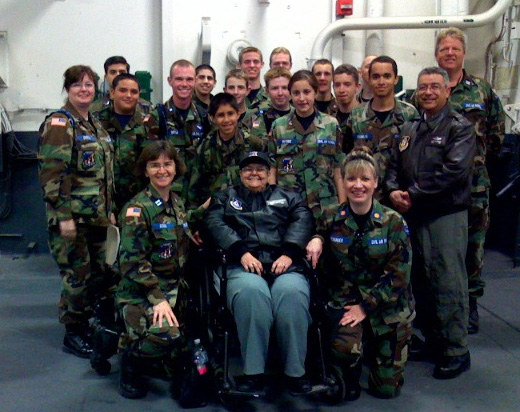
California CAP members pose for a photo during a visit to the USS Midway.

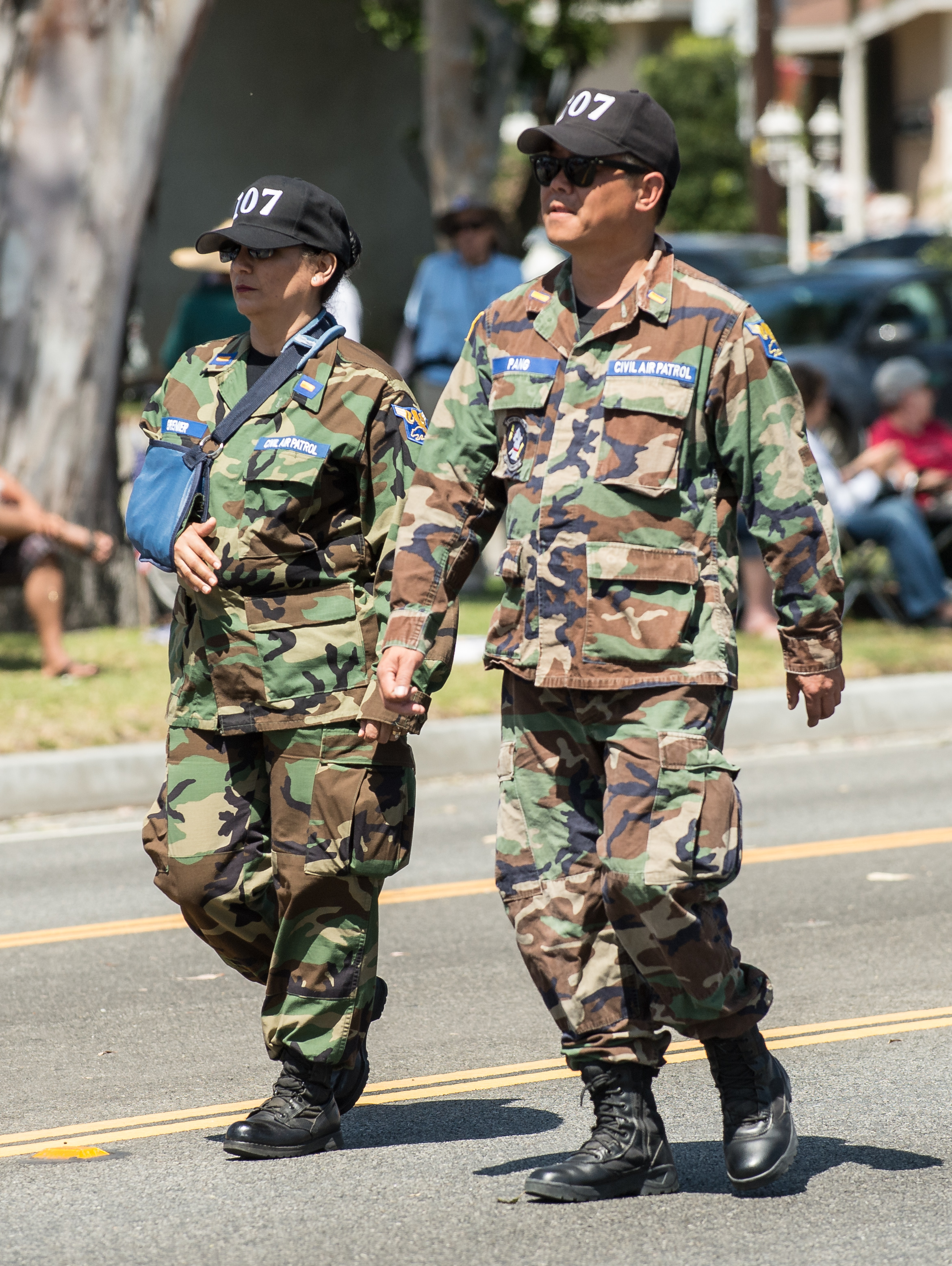
Two members of the Beach Cities Cadet Squadron working a public event.

California Wing is divided into eight groups across the state, with each squadron being assigned as a component of a group based on its geographical location.

Squadrons of the California Wing
Group	Designation	Squadron Name	Location	Notes
	CA000	California Wing Headquarters Squadron	Van Nuys	
	CA999	California Legislative Squadron	Sacramento	
Group 1	CA051	Capt Jay Weinsoff Cadet Squadron 3	Van Nuys	
	CA127	El Monte Composite Squadron 21	El Monte	
	CA080	San Fernando Senior Squadron 35	Pacoima	
	CA410	Clover Field Composite Squadron 51	Santa Monica	
	CA282	Brackett Composite Squadron 64	La Verne	
	CA285	Beach Cities Cadet Squadron 107	Torrance	
	CA379	Hawker Senior Squadron 128	Van Nuys	
	CA288	South Bay Senior Squadron 129	Torrance	
	CA116	San Fernando Cadet Squadron 137	Pacoima	
	CA292	Los Angeles Cadet Squadron 138	Downey	
Group 2	CA214	Jon E. Kramer Composite Squadron 10	Palo Alto	
	CA371	Santa Cruz Composite Squadron 13	Watsonville	
	CA015	East Bay Cadet Squadron 18	Hayward	
	CA334	Jason M. Dahl Cadet Squadron 36	San Jose	Formerly John J. Montgomery Memorial Cadet Squadron 36
	CA096	Diablo Composite Squadron 44	Concord	
	CA110	San Jose Senior Squadron 80	San Jose	
	CA414	San Francisco Cadet Squadron 86	San Francisco	
	CA346	Tri-Valley Composite Squadron 156	Livermore	
	CA452	Amelia Earhart Senior Squadron 188	Oakland	
	CA180	West Bay Composite Squadron 192	San Carlos	
Group 3	CA387	Riverside Senior Squadron 5	Riverside	
	CA435	Palm Springs Composite Squadron 11	Palm Springs	
	CA437	Chino Cadet Squadron 20	Chino	
	CA193	Cable Composite Squadron 25	Upland	
	CA423	Corona Cadet Squadron 29	Norco	
	CA123	Billie L. Leclair Cadet Squadron 31	Rialto	
	CA007	March Field Composite Squadron 45	March Air Reserve Base	
	CA458	Hemet-Ryan Composite Squadron 59	Hemet	
	CA333	Voyager Composite Squadron 120	Victorville	
	CA464	Big Bear Valley Composite Squadron 6750	Big Bear City	
Group 4	CA204	Camarillo Composite Squadron 61	Camarillo	
	CA158	Vandenberg Composite Squadron 101	Santa Maria	
	CA155	Bob Beevers Composite Squadron 103	San Luis Obispo	
	CA240	Santa Barbara Composite Squadron 131	Santa Barbara, California	
	CA448	Simi Valley Challenger Composite Squadron 1986	Simi Valley	
Group 5	CA151	Sacramento Composite Squadron 14	Sacramento	
	CA397	Beale Composite Squadron 19	Yuba City	
	CA138	Travis Composite Squadron 22	Travis Air Force Base	
	CA016	Marin Composite Squadron 23	Novato	
	CA046	Sierra Composite Squadron 72	French Camp	
	CA273	Eugene L. Carnahan Cadet Squadron 85	Placerville	Formerly Foothill Composite Squadron 85
	CA034	Auburn-Starr Composite Squadron 92	Auburn, California	
	CA475	Butte County Composite Squadron 95	Oroville	
	CA246	Shasta Composite Squadron 126	Redding	
	CA249	Sonoma County Composite Squadron 157	Santa Rosa	
	CA802	California Aerospace Composite Squadron	McClellan	
Group 6	CA425	Tehachapi Composite Squadron 46	Tehachapi	
	CA469	Pancho Barnes Composite Squadron 49	Rosamond	
	CA146	Lt Col Arthur King Composite Squadron 50	Modesto	
	CA140	Edwards AFB Composite Squadron 84	Edwards	
	CA169	Fresno Composite Squadron 112	Fresno	
	CA224	Bakersfield Composite Squadron 121	Bakersfield	
	CA389	Merced County Composite Squadron 147	Atwater	
	CA394	Porterville Composite Squadron 394	Porterville	Formerly Visalia, Tulare-Kings Composite Squadron 394
	CA804	Joe Walker Middle School Cadet Squadron	Lancaster	
	CA185	Mariposa-Yosemite Composite Squadron 1850	Mariposa	
Group 7	CA434	Falcon Senior Squadron 40	Fullerton	
	CA428	Los Alamitos Glider Training Squadron 41	Los Alamitos	
	CA295	Fullerton Composite Squadron 56	Fullerton	
	CA384	Saddleback Composite Squadron 68	Costa Mesa	
	CA343	Long Beach Senior Squadron 150	Los Alamitos	
	CA345	Los Alamitos Cadet Squadron 153	Los Alamitos	
	CA478	South County Squadron 232	Mission Viejo	
Group 8	CA324	Skyhawk Composite Squadron 47	Marine Corps Base Camp Pendleton	
	CA256	San Diego Senior Squadron 57	El Cajon	
	CA466	Fallbrook Senior Squadron 87	Fallbrook	
	CA441	San Diego Cadet Squadron 144	San Diego	
	CA473	South San Diego Cadet Squadron 201	Chula Vista	
	CA803	Escondido Cadet Squadron	Escondido	

== Legal protection ==
Members of Civil Air Patrol who are employed within the borders of California are guaranteed ten days of unpaid leave from their employer when responding to emergencies as a member of Civil Air Patrol, under California Labor Code § 1503.

== See also ==
- California Air National Guard
- California Cadet Corps
- California State Military Reserve
