= 129th Rescue Squadron =

129th Rescue Squadron

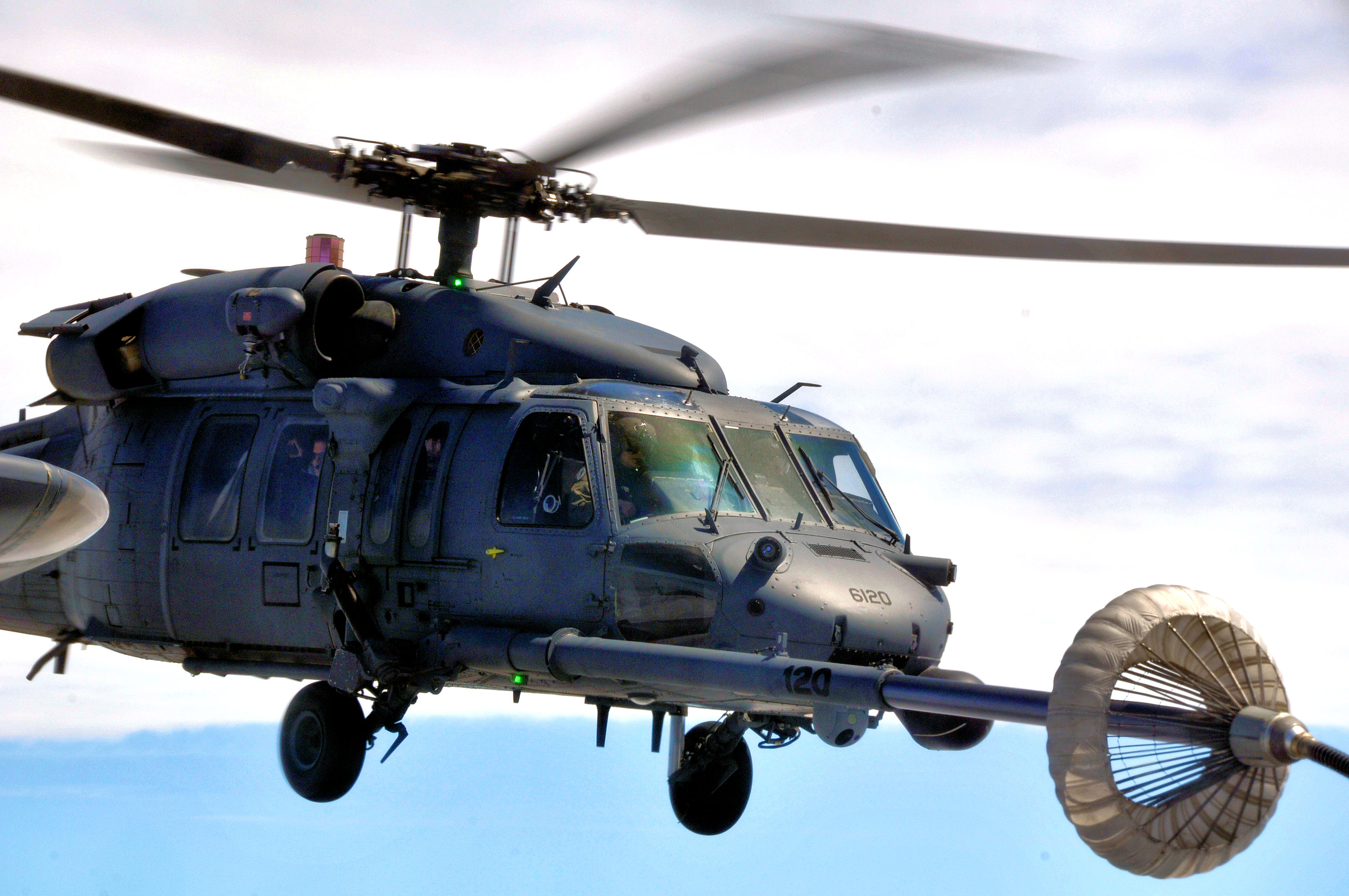
- A Squadron HH-60G Pave Hawk helicopter refuels from a MC-130P Combat Shadow from the 130th Rescue Squadron
- Active: 1955–present
- Country: United States
- Allegiance: California
- Branch: Air National Guard
- Type: Squadron
- Role: Combat search and rescue
- Part of: California Air National Guard
- Garrison/HQ: Moffett Federal Airfield, California
- Engagements: Operation Iraqi Freedom, Operation Enduring Freedom

Insignia
- 129th Rescue Squadron emblem

Aircraft flown
- Helicopter: HH-60W Jolly Green II

The 129th Rescue Squadron is a unit of the California Air National Guard 129th Rescue Wing located at Moffett Federal Airfield, Mountain View, California. The 129th is equipped with the HH-60W Jolly Green II helicopters. If activated to federal service, the 129 RQS is gained within the United States Air Force by the Air Combat Command.

== Mission ==
The primary mission is to prepare for wartime taskings as specified by applicable gaining commands. The peacetime mission is under the control of the Governor of California. Upon mobilization, primary specified mission is combat search and rescue (CSAR). When directed by the California State Office of Emergency Services and/or the Department of Defense, the mission is to provide disaster relief support as required. This includes search and rescue assistance to civil authorities, including International Civil Aeronautics Organization signatories, and foreign governments.

Its federal mission is To provide manpower, material and equipment resources to conduct and complete combat search and rescue operations on a worldwide basis. To provide manpower, material and equipment to conduct and complete peacetime search operations.

Its state mission (California Air National Guard) is to furnish trained personnel to respond to state emergencies, such as natural disasters, and to assist civil authorities in the enforcement of the law.

== History ==
=== Special operations ===
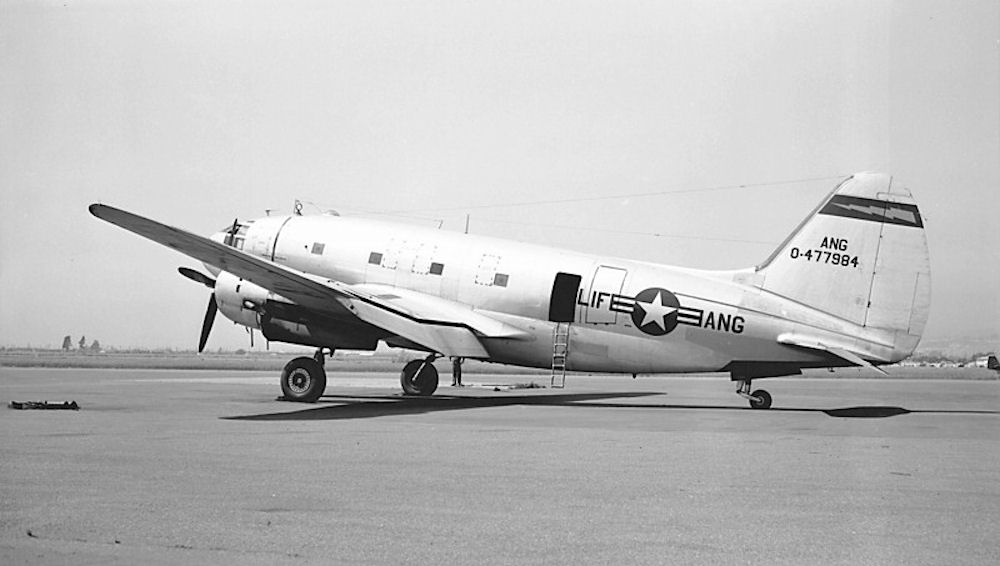
129th ARS C-46D, AF Ser. No. 44-77984, circa 1955

The California Air National Guard's introduction to the world of special operations began when Air Force leaders decided to phase out active duty air commando units (Known as Air Resupply units) in 1954. Despite the decision, there was still a need to maintain a limited number of crews and aircraft to support unconventional warfare missions. After lengthy deliberations, the Air Force decided in 1955 to establish four special air warfare units within the Air National Guard: the 129th in California, the 130th in West Virginia, the 143d in Rhode Island, and the 135th Air Resupply Group in Maryland.

The 129th Air Resupply Squadron was established in April 1955 as a new California Air National Guard unit with no previous United States Air Force history or lineage by the National Guard Bureau. Activated on 4 April at Hayward Municipal Airport, the squadron was assigned to the 129th Air Resupply Group. It was equipped with C-46 Commando transports.

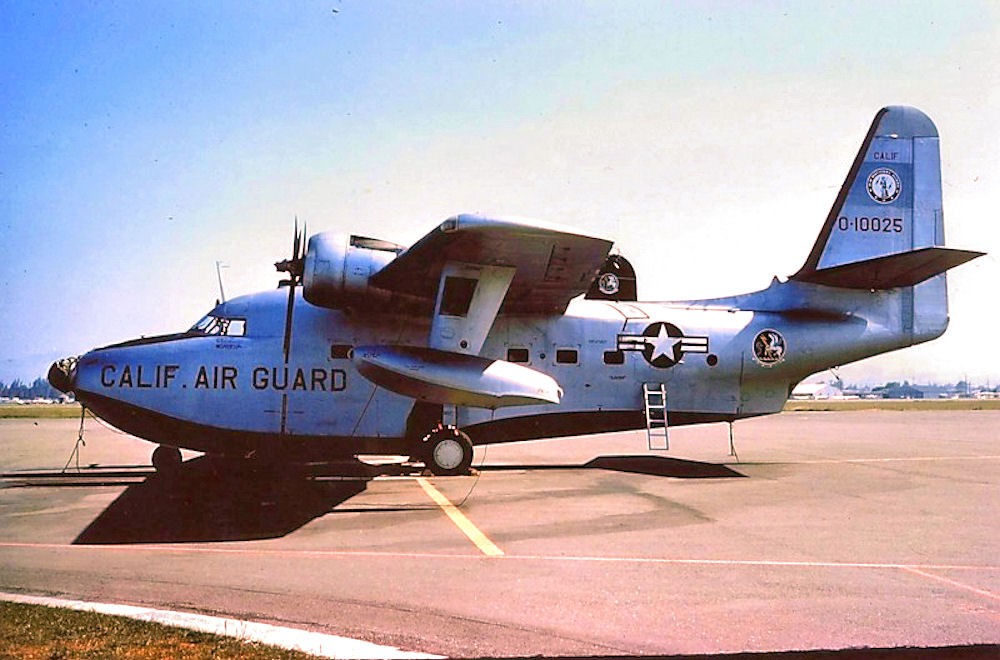
129th ACS SA-16A Albatross, AF Ser. No. 51-0025, circa 1965

The 129th was designated at the time as a psychological warfare (PSYWAR) unit which supported USAF unconventional warfare (guerrilla warfare), direct action (commando-type raids), strategic reconnaissance (intelligence gathering), and PSYWAR operations. The C-46 was supplemented by SA-16 Albatross amphibious aircraft beginning in 1956. The SA-16 (later redesignated HU-16 Albatross) completely replaced the C-46s in 1963. Training for water landings with the SA-16 was extremely hazardous. To make matters worse, doctrine required pilots to land their aircraft on water at night, with no landing lights.

Ultimately, the 129th's mission included counterinsurgency, military civic action, psychological operations, tactical air operations, and unconventional warfare. In addition to blacked-out water landings, the SA-16 crews practiced pulling personnel from the ground by means of the Fulton Recovery System, which was "like bungee jumping in reverse."

Reassigned to Tactical Air Command in 1963 and re-designated as Air Commando unit, following the revival of an active duty air commando unit at Hurlburt Field, Florida in line with President John F. Kennedy's initiative to bolster the United States military special forces during the early involvement in the Vietnam War. In 1963, the 129th participated in Exercise Swift Strike III, one of the largest military maneuvers since World War II. During the exercise, the unit not only flew a variety of special air warfare missions.

Continuing its mission and training with the active duty 1st Air Commando Group in Northern Florida, in 1968 HQ USAF directed all zir commando organizations be redesignated as "Special Operations" units to be more descriptive of their mission.

=== Rescue and recovery ===
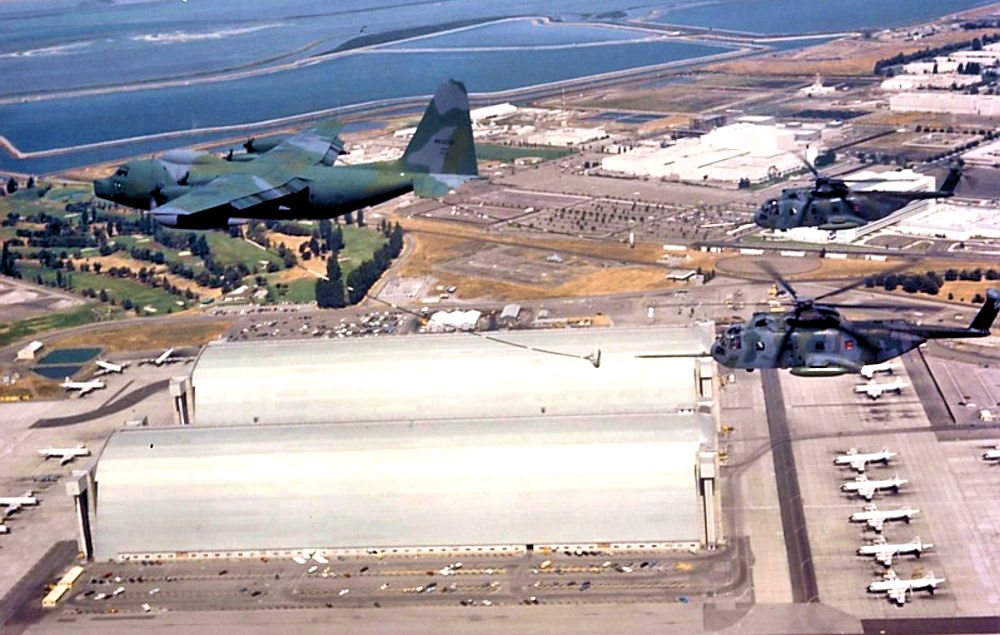
An HC-130P refueling a HH-3Es over then-NAS Moffett Field, circa 1990.

In May 1975 after the end of the Vietnam War, the mission of the 129th was realigned, and the unit became part of the Aerospace Rescue and Recovery Service, Military Airlift Command. In 1980 the unit moved from Hayward to Naval Air Station Moffett Field.

The 129th has been assigned to support operation Iraqi Freedom.

In 2003 the Air Force reorganized Air National Guard rescue units and created separate squadrons for fixed-wing, helicopter and pararescue elements of the 129th Rescue Squadron. The HH-60 helicopter flight became 129th Rescue Squadron; the HC-130P Hercules flight become the 130th Rescue Squadron, and the pararescue flight became the 131st Rescue Squadron.

The 129th has been assigned to support Operation Iraqi Freedom in Iraq and Operation Enduring Freedom in Afghanistan in support of the global war on terrorism.

The first HH-60W Jolly Green II arrived on 31 January 2025. The 129th was the last Air Force unit to operate the HH-60G until the type's retirement on 21 September 2026.

== Lineage ==
- Constituted as the 129th Air Resupply Squadron, and allotted to the Air National Guard in 1955

Received federal recognition and activated on 3 April 1955
Redesignated 129th Troop Carrier Squadron, Medium on 1 November 1958
Redesignated 129th Air Commando Squadron on 1 July 1963
Redesignated 129th Special Operations Squadron on 8 August 1968
Redesignated 129th Aerospace Rescue and Recovery Squadron on 3 May 1975
Redesignated 129th Air Rescue Squadron on 1 October 1989
Redesignated 129th Rescue Squadron on 16 March 1992

=== Assignments ===
- 129th Air Resupply Group, 3 April 1955
- California Air National Guard, 1 November 1958
- 129th Troop Carrier Group (later 129th Air Commando Group, 129th Special Operations Group, 129th Aerospace Rescue and Recovery Group, 129th Air Rescue Group, 129th Rescue Group), January 1962
- 129th Operations Group, 1 October 1995 – Present

=== Stations ===
- Hayward Municipal Airport, California, 3 April 1955
- Naval Air Station Moffett Field (later Moffett Federal Airfield), California, May 1980 – present

=== Aircraft ===
- C-46 Commando, 1955–1963
- SA-16 Albatross, 1963–1968
- C-119 Flying Boxcar, 1968–1975
- Cessna U-3A, 1968–1975
- U-6A Beaver, 1968–1975

- U-10D Super Courier, 1968–1975
- HH-3E Jolly Green Giant, 1975–1991
- HC-130P Hercules, 1975–2002
- MC-130P Combat Shadow, 2002–2003
- HH-60G Pave Hawk, 1991–2026
- HH-60W Jolly Green II, 2025-Present
