= Sikorsky HH-60 Pave Hawk =

American medium-lift military helicopter

HH-60 / MH-60 Pave Hawk HH-60W Jolly Green II
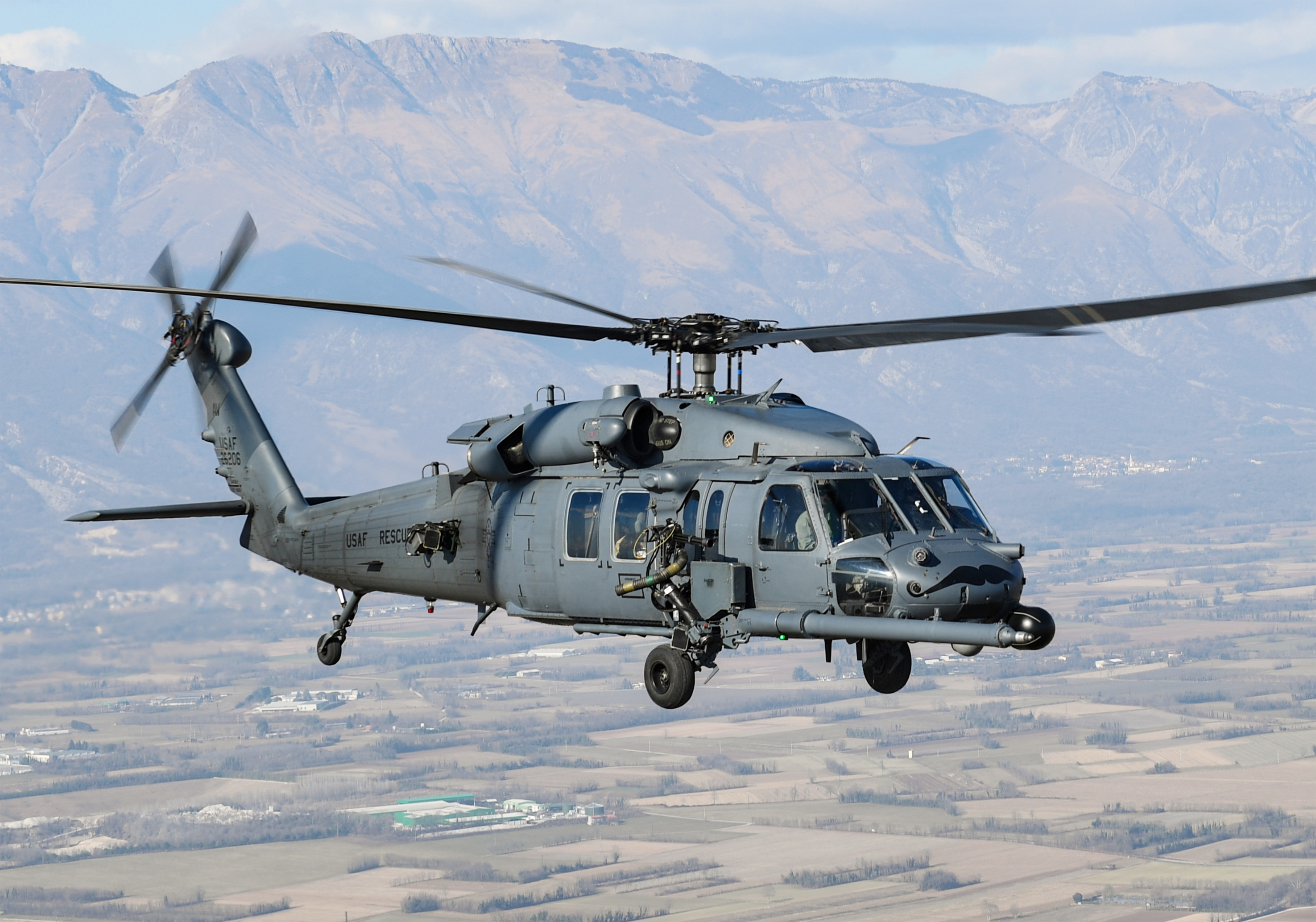
- US Air Force HH-60G Pave Hawk

General information
- Type: Combat search and rescue helicopter
- Manufacturer: Sikorsky Aircraft
- Status: In service
- Primary users: United States Air Force Republic of Korea Air Force
- Number built: 112 (HH-60G Pave Hawk)

History
- Introduction date: 1982
- Developed from: Sikorsky UH-60 Black Hawk

The Sikorsky MH-60/HH-60 Pave Hawk and HH-60W Jolly Green II are a four-blade, twin-engine, medium-lift utility military helicopter manufactured by Sikorsky Aircraft. Both are derived from the Sikorsky S-70 and the UH-60 Black Hawk; they incorporate the United States Air Force (USAF) PAVE electronic systems program and are designed for day or night operations into hostile environments.

The MH-60G Pave Hawk's primary mission was the insertion and recovery of special operations personnel. The HH-60G Pave Hawk's core mission is recovery of personnel under hostile conditions, including combat search and rescue. The HH-60G may also perform peacetime operations such as civil search and rescue, emergency aeromedical evacuation (MEDEVAC), disaster relief, international aid and counter-drug activities.

As of the 2020s, the USAF is replacing its HH/MH-60Gs with a new variant, the HH-60W Jolly Green II. Another variant, the HH-60P, is operated by South Korea.

== Design and development ==
In 1981, the United States Air Force (USAF) chose the UH-60A Black Hawk to replace its HH-3E Jolly Green Giant helicopters. After acquiring some UH-60s, the USAF began upgrading each with an air refueling probe and additional fuel tanks in the cabin. The machine guns were changed from 7.62 mm (0.308 in) M60s to 0.50 caliber (12.7 mm) XM218s. These helicopters were referred to as "Credible Hawks" and entered service in 1987.

Afterwards, the Credible Hawks and new UH-60As were upgraded and designated MH-60G Pave Hawk. These upgrades were to be done in a two-step process. However, funding allowed only 16 Credible Hawks to receive the second step equipment, these were allocated to special operations use. The remaining 82 Credible Hawks received the first step upgrade equipment and were used for combat search and rescue. In 1991, these search and rescue Pave Hawks were redesignated HH-60G.

The Pave Hawk is a highly modified version of the Sikorsky UH-60 Black Hawk. It features an upgraded communications and navigation suite that includes an integrated inertial navigation/global positioning/Doppler navigation systems, satellite communications, secure voice, and Have Quick communications. The term PAVE stands for Precision Avionics Vectoring Equipment.

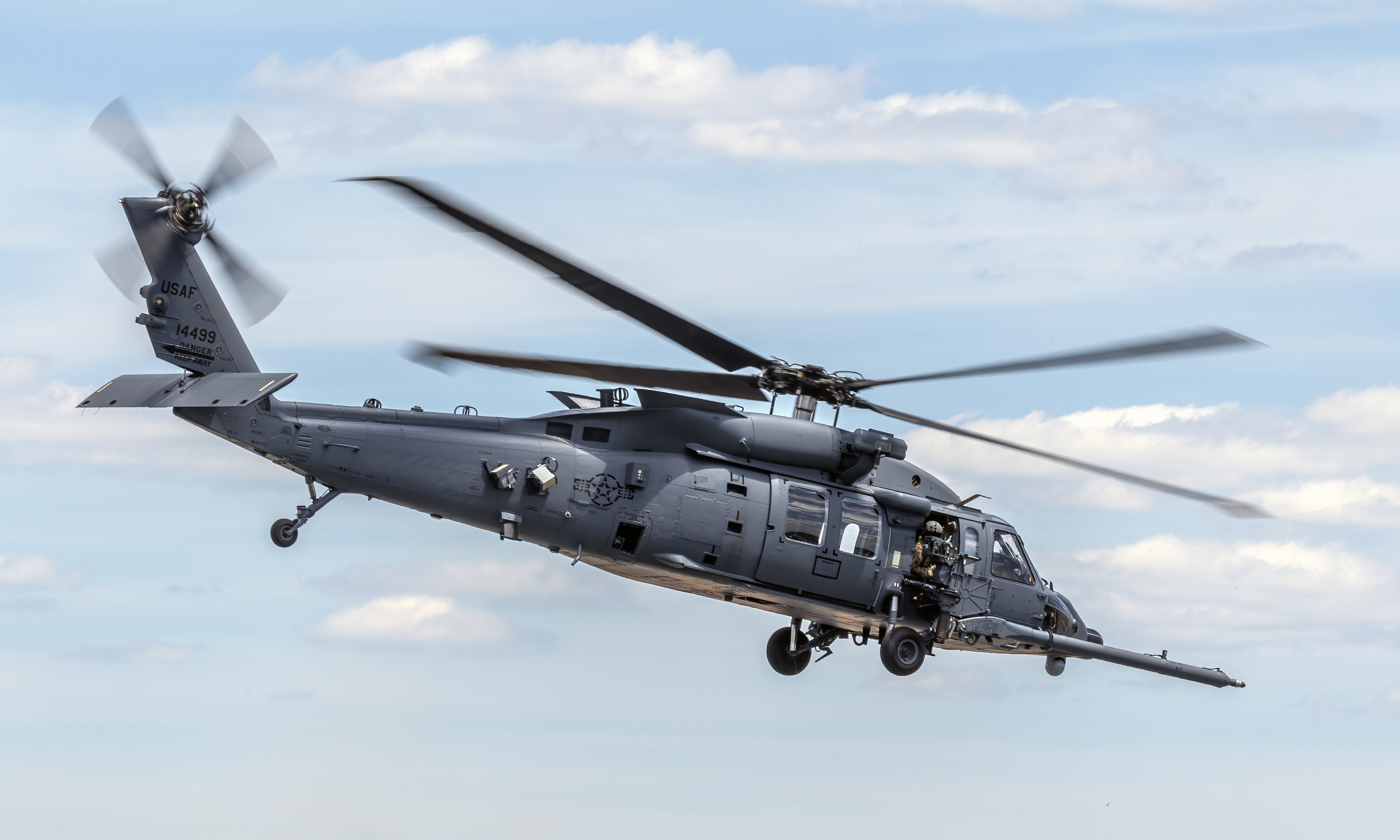
HH-60W in June 2022

All HH-60Gs have an automatic flight control system, night vision goggles lighting and forward looking infrared system that greatly enhances night low-level operations. Additionally, some Pave Hawks have color weather radar and an engine/rotor blade anti-ice system that gives the HH-60G an all-weather capability. Pave Hawk mission equipment includes a retractable in-flight refueling probe, internal auxiliary fuel tanks, two crew-served (or pilot-controlled) 7.62 mm (0.308 in) miniguns or 0.50-caliber machine guns and an 8,000-pound (3,600 kg) capacity cargo hook. To improve air transportability and shipboard operations, all HH-60Gs have folding rotor blades.

Pave Hawk combat enhancements include a radar warning receiver, infrared jammer and a flare/chaff countermeasure dispensing system. HH-60G rescue equipment includes a hoist capable of lifting a 600-pound (270 kg) load from a hover height of 200 feet (60 m), and a personnel locating system. A number of Pave Hawks are equipped with an over-the-horizon tactical data receiver that is capable of receiving near real-time mission update information.

=== Replacement ===
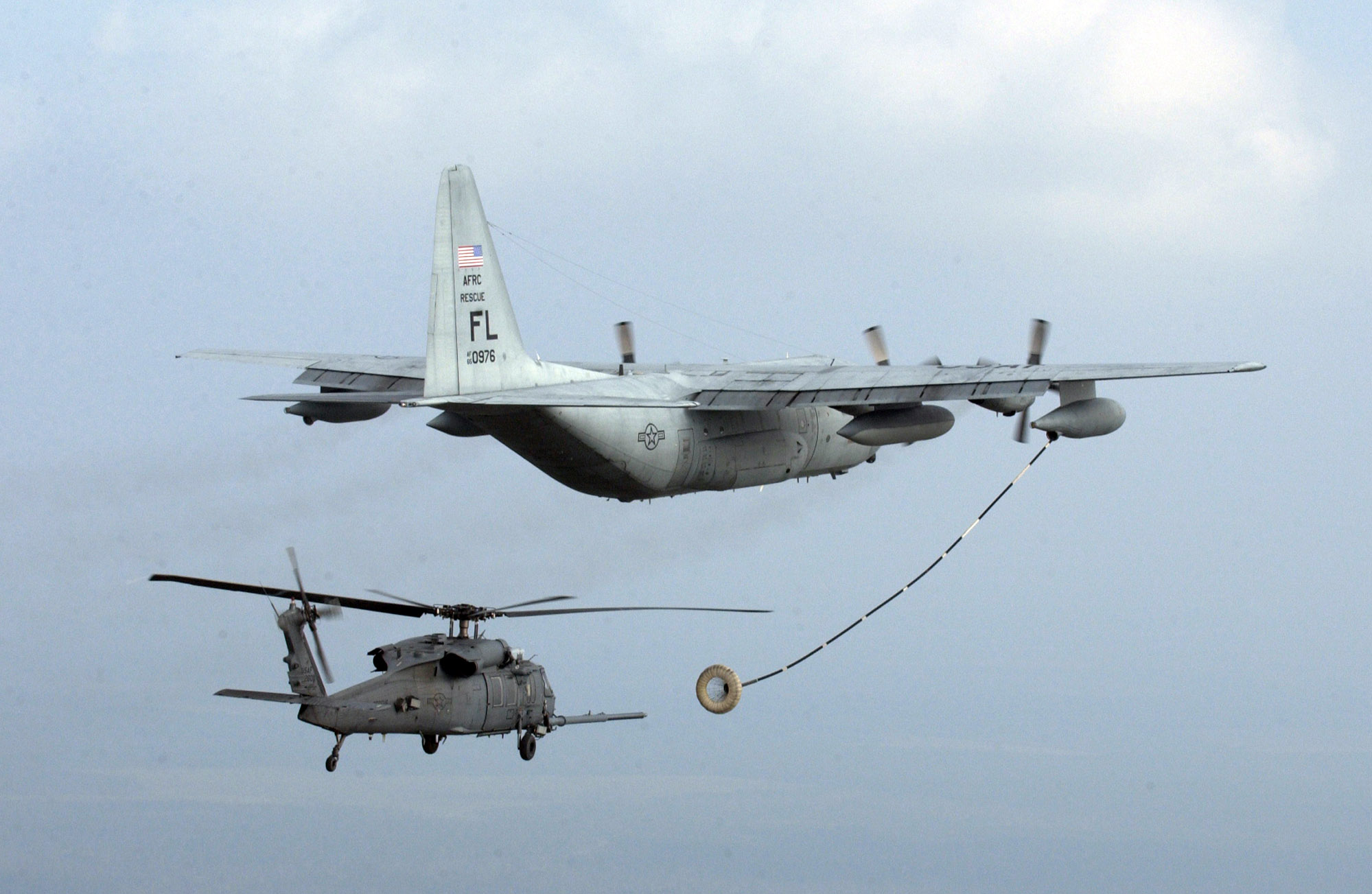
An HH-60G about to refuel from a USAF HC-130P

In 1999, the USAF identified a need for a helicopter with improved range, speed, and cabin space. An options analysis was completed in 2002 and funding for 141 aircraft under the "personnel recovery vehicle" program began in 2004. In 2005, it was renamed CSAR-X, meaning combat search and rescue. Sikorsky entered the HH-92 Superhawk, Lockheed Martin entered the VH-71 Kestrel, and Boeing entered the HH-47 Chinook. The HH-47 won the competition in November 2006, but the award was cancelled after successful protests from both rival competitors. A Request for Proposals (RFP) was reissued in 2007, but protested again before proposals were received, leading to a second cancellation. In March 2010, the USAF announced a recapitalization plan to return its 99-aircraft inventory to 112 airframes, incrementally replacing aging HH-60Gs; a secondary plan to replace 13 attrition HH-60s, 7 of which were lost in combat since 2001, was also initiated. The USAF deferred secondary combat search and rescue requirements calling for a larger helicopter. A UH-60M-based version was offered as a replacement.

On 22 October 2012, the USAF issued an RFP for up to 112 Combat Rescue Helicopters (CRH) to replace the HH-60G with the primary mission of personnel recovery from hostile territory; other missions include civil search and rescue, disaster relief, casualty and medical evacuation. It had to have a combat radius of 225 nmi (259 mi; 417 km), a payload of 1,500 lb (680 kg), and space for up to four stretchers. The AgustaWestland AW101 was one entrant. By December 2012, competitors AgustaWestland, EADS, Boeing, and Bell Helicopter had withdrawn amid claims that the RFP favored Sikorsky and did not reward rival aircraft's capabilities. The USAF argued that the competition was not written to favor Sikorsky, and that the terms were clear as to the capabilities they wanted and could afford. Sikorsky was the only bidder remaining, with subcontractor Lockheed Martin supplying mission equipment and the electronic survivability suite. Sikorsky and the USAF extensively evaluated the proposed CRH-60, a variant of the MH-60 special operations helicopter; the CRH-60 differed from the MH-60 by its greater payload and cabin capacity, wider rotor blades, and better hover capability.

In September 2013, the initial USAF FY 2015 budget proposal would have cancelled the CRH program due to sequestration budget cuts, instead retaining the existing HH-60 fleet. Congress allocated over $300 million to the program in FY 2014, with $430 million to be moved from other areas through FY 2019 to finance it. On 26 June 2014, the USAF awarded Sikorsky and Lockheed Martin a $1.3 billion contract for the first four aircraft, with 112 total to be procured for a total of up to $7.9 billion. Five more are to be delivered by 2020 and the order is to be completed by 2029. On 24 November 2014, the USAF officially designated the UH-60M-derived CRH the HH-60W. It first flew on 17 May 2019. In February 2020, the HH-60W was named the "Jolly Green II" by the USAF. The 41st Rescue Squadron received the first two HH-60W helicopters on 5 November 2020.

In July 2025, the US State Department approved a possible Foreign Military Sale of up to nine HH‑60W Jolly Green II combat rescue helicopters to Norway, along with associated equipment, training, and support, at an estimated cost of US$2.6 billion. Norway has not signed a procurement contract as of July 2025.

== Operational history ==
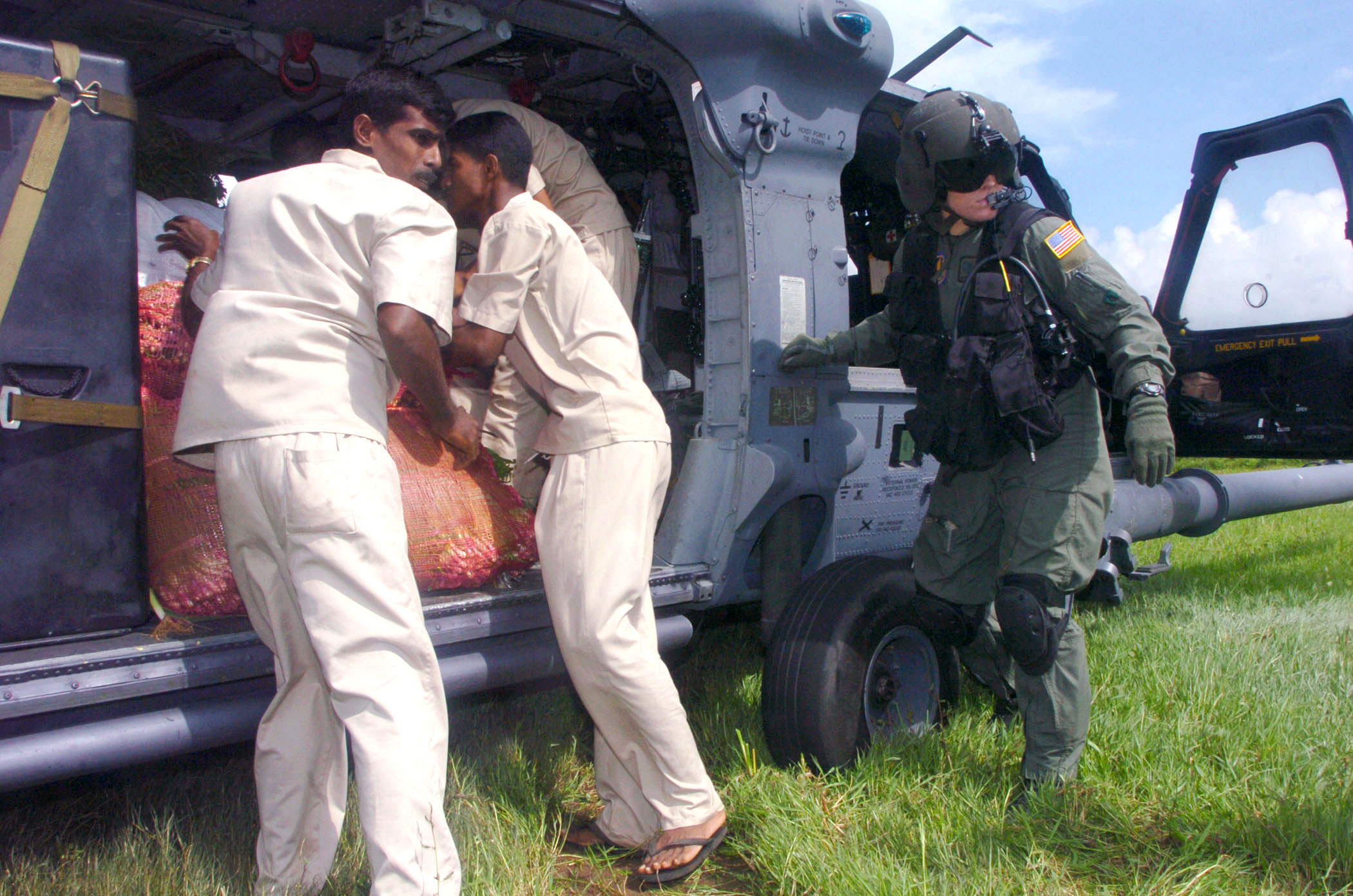
Sri Lankan relief workers unload vegetables from an HH-60G during an Operation Unified Assistance mission

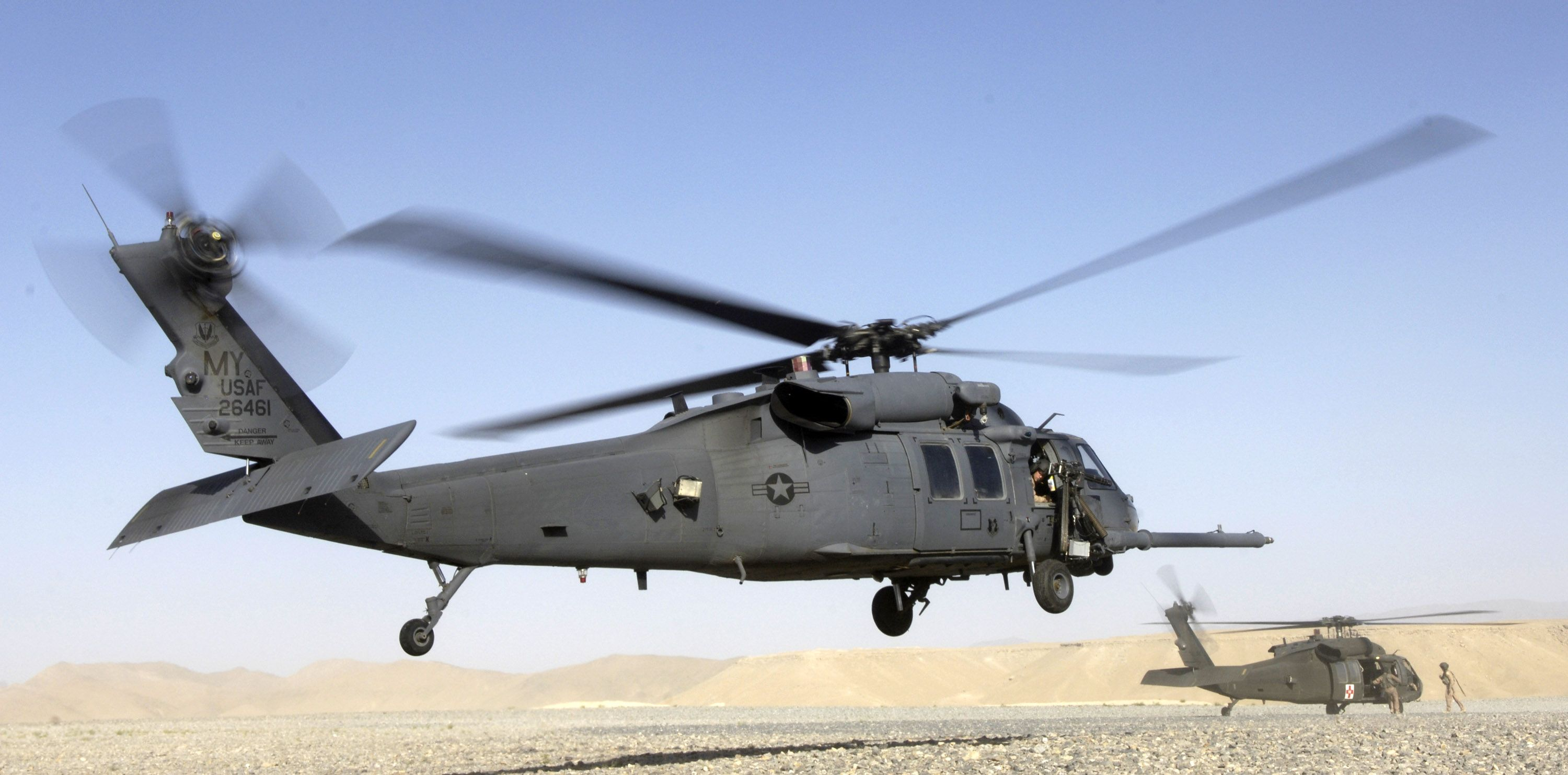
An HH-60 Pave Hawk lands as an Army UH-60 Black Hawk prepares to pick up a patient in Afghanistan, 2009.

By 2015, the USAF's HH-60G Pave Hawk was allocated to the Air Combat Command (ACC), US Air Forces in Europe (USAFE), Pacific Air Forces (PACAF), Air Education and Training Command (AETC), the Air Force Reserve Command (AFRC) and the Air National Guard (ANG). Some HH-60Gs are also operated by the Air Force Materiel Command (AFMC) for flight tests.

During Operation Desert Storm, Pave Hawks provided combat search and rescue coverage for coalition air forces in western Iraq, Saudi Arabia, coastal Kuwait and the Persian Gulf. They also provided emergency evacuation coverage for US Navy SEAL teams landing on the Kuwaiti coast before the invasion.

The Air Force Special Operations Command (AFSOC) got rid of its MH-60Gs configured for CSAR operations in 1991, redesignating them as HH-60Gs and giving them to Air Combat Command (ACC) and ACC-gained Air Force Reserve Command and Air National Guard units. AFSOC ceased all MH-60 operations in 1999.

On 29 October 1992, a MH-60G Pave Hawk crashed in the Great Salt Lake of Utah about 100 yards north of Antelope Island during a training exercise in bad weather. Twelve members of the US Army's 75th Ranger Regiment and the USAF's 1st Special Operations Wing died in the accident. The pilot, Air Force Maj. Stephan J. Laushine, was the only survivor.

During Operation Allied Force, the Pave Hawk provided continuous combat search and rescue coverage for NATO air forces, and recovered two USAF pilots who were isolated behind enemy lines.

In March 2000, three Pave Hawks deployed to Hoedspruit Air Force Base in South Africa to support international flood relief operations in Mozambique. The HH-60Gs flew 240 missions in 17 days and delivered more than 160 tons of humanitarian relief supplies.

In early 2005, USAF Pave Hawks also took part in a massive humanitarian relief effort to help Sri Lankan victims of the tsunami. In the fall of 2005, Pave Hawks from various USAF commands helped rescue thousands of stranded survivors of Hurricane Katrina.

Pave Hawks operated during Operation Iraqi Freedom, Operation New Dawn, and Operation Enduring Freedom, supporting Army and Marine Corps ground combat operations and standby search and rescue support for US and coalition fixed-wing combat aircraft.

On 15 March 2018, a CSAR HH-60G crashed near the Iraqi city of al-Qa'im, killing all seven on board.

In early April 2026, HH-60Ws participated in Operation Epic Fury, successfully rescuing the pilot of a downed F-15E Strike Eagle inside Iranian territory.

== Variants ==
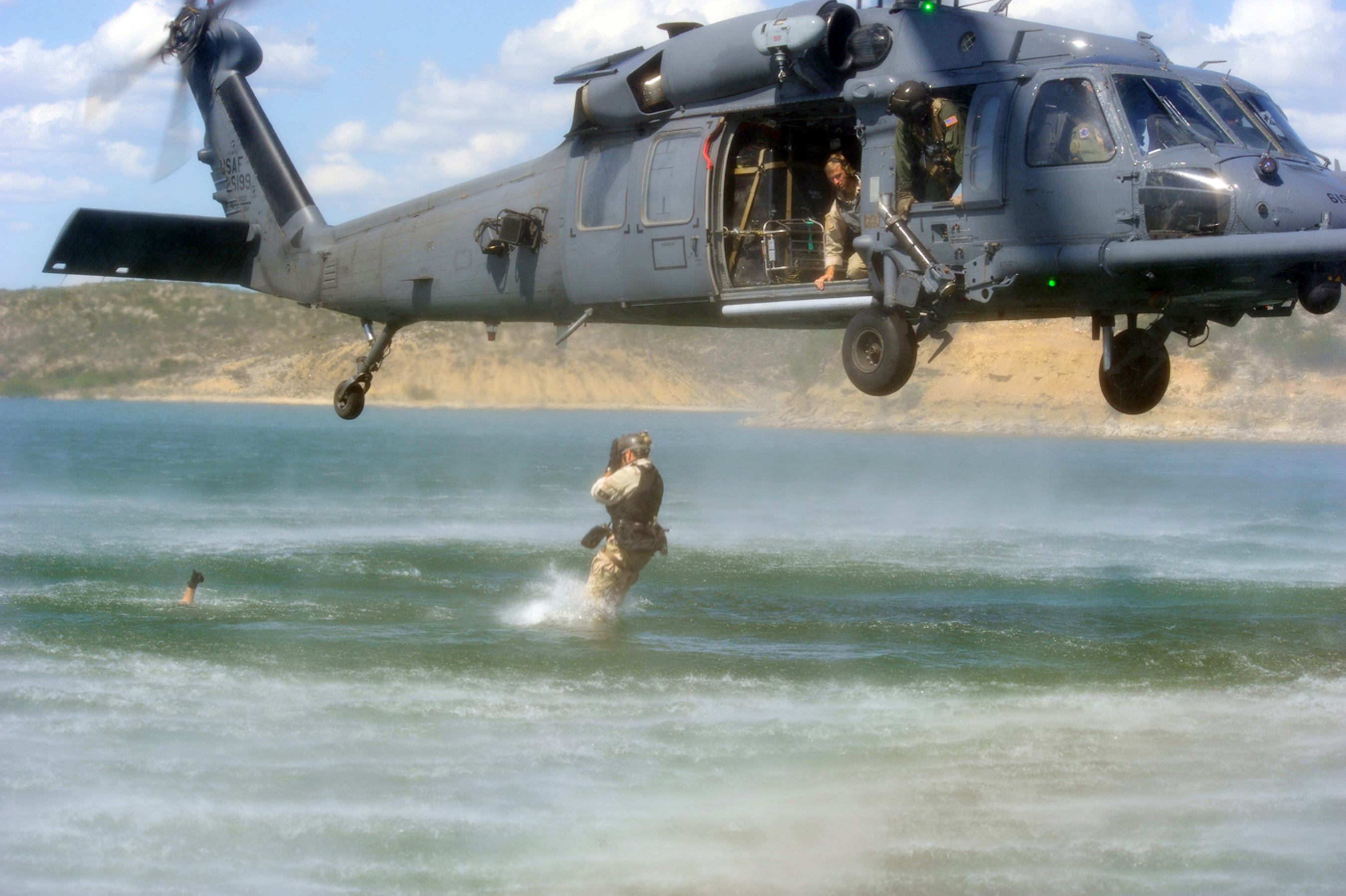
Exercises with a HH-60 Pave Hawk, 2010

- HH-60A: Prototype for the HH-60D rescue helicopter. A modified UH-60A primarily designed for combat search and rescue. It is equipped with a rescue hoist with a 200 ft (60 m) cable that has a 600 lb (270 kg) lift capability, and a retractable in-flight refueling probe.
- HH-60D Night Hawk: Prototype of combat rescue variant for the USAF.
- HH-60E: Proposed search and rescue variant for the USAF.
- HH-60G Pave Hawk: Search and rescue helicopter for the USAF upgraded from UH-60A Credible Hawk.
- MH-60G Pave Hawk: Special Operations, search and rescue model for the USAF. Equipped with long-range fuel tanks, air-to-air refueling capability, FLIR, improved doppler radar. Powered by T-700-GE-700/701 engines. Operated by AFSOC's 55th Special Operations Squadron between 1982 and 1999. The helicopters were then transferred to ACC, the last was retired in May 2021.
- Maplehawk: Proposed search and rescue version for the Canadian Forces to replace aging CH-113 Labradors. The CF opted for the CH-149 Cormorant instead.
- HH-60P Pave Hawk: Combat Search and Rescue variant of UH-60P, in service with Republic of Korea Air Force. Variant includes External Tank System and FLIR for night operations.
- HH-60U: The USAF has four HH-60U "Ghost Hawks", which are converted "M" variants that are based at Area 51.
- HH-60W Jolly Green II: Combat rescue helicopter variant of the UH-60M for the USAF to replace the HH-60G.

== Operators ==
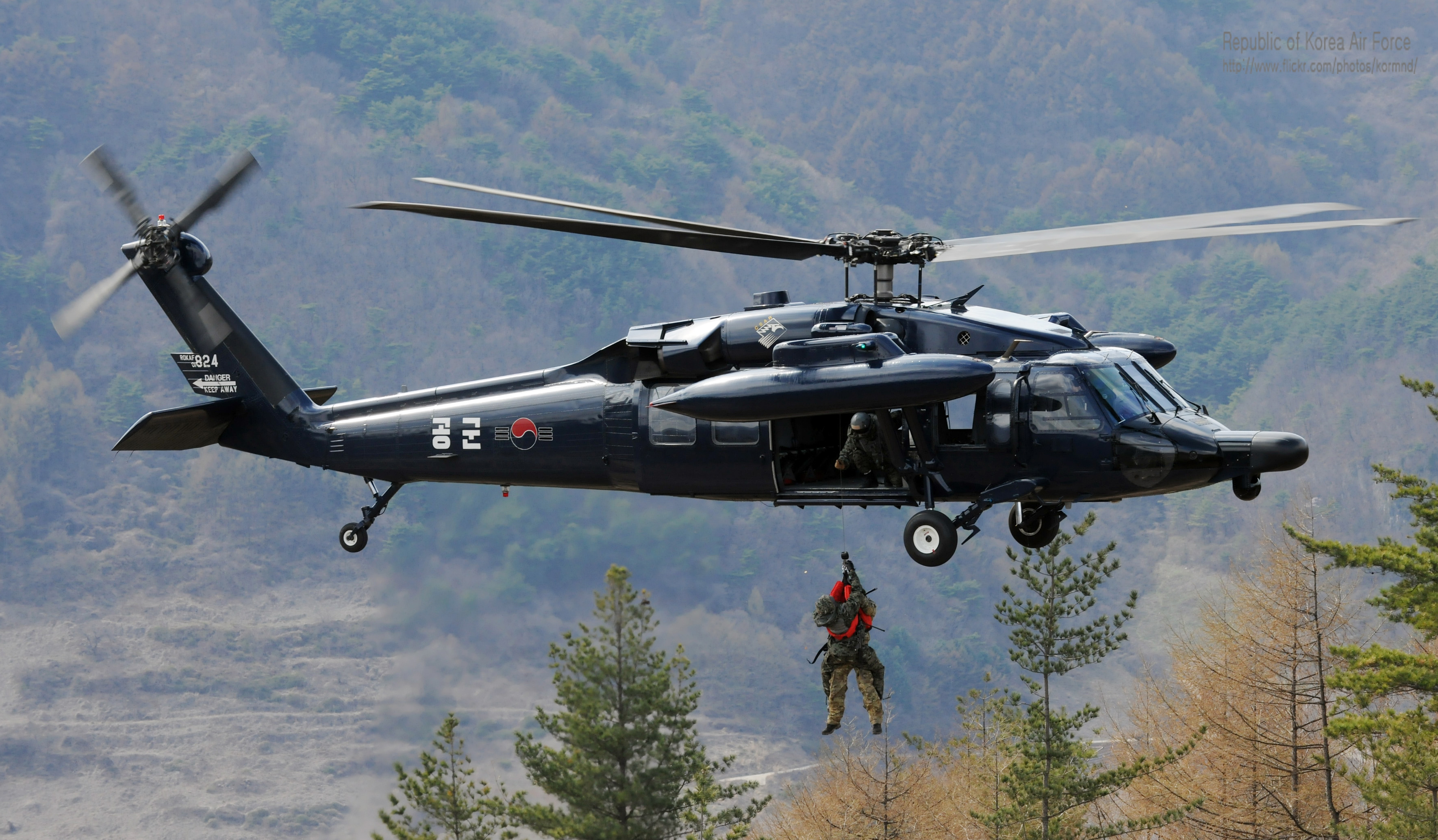
A Republic of Korea Air Force HH-60P conducting mountain rescue training in April 2011.

Republic of Korea

- Republic of Korea Air Force operates HH-60P helicopters

United States

- United States Air Force
  - 33rd Rescue Squadron
  - 34th Weapons Squadron
  - 38th Rescue Squadron
  - 41st Rescue Squadron
  - 55th Rescue Squadron
  - 56th Rescue Squadron
  - 66th Rescue Squadron
  - 101st Rescue Squadron (New York Air National Guard)
  - 129th Rescue Squadron (California Air National Guard)
  - 188th Rescue Squadron (New Mexico Air National Guard)
  - 210th Rescue Squadron (Alaska Air National Guard)
  - 301st Rescue Squadron (Air Force Reserve Command)
  - 305th Rescue Squadron (Air Force Reserve Command)
  - 413th Flight Test Squadron (Air Force Materiel Command)
  - 512th Rescue Squadron (Air Education & Training Command)
  - 316th Wing (Air Force District of Washington)

== Specifications (HH-60G) ==

Data from USAF 2008 Almanac, USAF fact sheet

General characteristics

- Crew: four (two pilots, and two special mission aviators/aerial gunners)
- Capacity: maximum crew 6 / 8 to 12 troops / litters or other cargo
- Length: 64 ft 10 in (19.76 m)
- Height: 16 ft 8 in (5.08 m)
- Empty weight: 16,000 lb (7,257 kg)
- Max takeoff weight: 22,000 lb (9,979 kg)
- Powerplant: 2 × General Electric T700-GE-700 / -701C turboshaft engines, 1,940 shp (1,450 kW) each
- Main rotor diameter: 52 ft 8 in (16.05 m)

Performance

- Maximum speed: 193 kn (222 mph, 357 km/h)
- Cruise speed: 159 kn (183 mph, 294 km/h)
- Range: 373 nmi (429 mi, 691 km) with internal fuel
- Ferry range: 508 nmi (585 mi, 941 km) with external tanks
- Service ceiling: 14,000 ft (4,300 m)

Armament

- 2 × 7.62 mm (0.308 in) miniguns or
- 2 × 0.50 caliber (12.7 mm) GAU-18/A heavy machine guns

Avionics

- INS/GPS/Doppler navigation
- SATCOM satellite communications
- Secure/anti-jam communications
- LARS (Lightweight Airborne Recovery System) range/steering radio to compatible survivor radios
- Aircraft flight control system
- Night vision goggle lighting
- Forward looking infrared
- Color weather radar
- RWR combat enhancement
- Infrared jamming unit
- Flare/chaff countermeasure dispensing system

== See also ==
- US helicopter armament subsystems

Related development

- Sikorsky H-92 Superhawk
- Sikorsky MH-60 Jayhawk
- Sikorsky S-70
- Sikorsky SH-60 Seahawk
- Sikorsky UH-60 Black Hawk

Aircraft of comparable role, configuration, and era

- Boeing MH-47E/G
- Harbin Z-20S
- Sikorsky MH-53 Pave Low

Related lists

- List of active United States military aircraft
- List of rotorcraft
- List of Sikorsky S-70 Models
