= California Air National Guard =

- Shield of the California Air National Guard
- Active: 16 June 1924 – Present
- Country: United States
- Allegiance: State of California
- Branch: Air National Guard
- Type: State militia, reserve force
- Role: "To organize, train, equip, and resource community based land forces to support state and/or federal authority"
- Size: 4,937
- Part of: California National Guard; National Guard Bureau; National Guard
- Garrison/HQ: 9800 Goethe Road, Sacramento, CA 95826
- Nicknames: Air Guard; CalGuard
- Mottos: "Always Ready, Always There!"
- Website: https://calguard.ca.gov/air/

Commanders
- Civilian leadership: President Donald Trump (Commander-in-Chief (when federalized)); Troy Meink (Secretary of the Air Force); Governor Gavin Newsom (Commander-in-Chief)
- Military Commander: Major General Steven J. Butow

Aircraft flown
- Fighter: F-15 Eagle
- Helicopter: HH-60G Pave Hawk
- Reconnaissance: MQ-1 Predator (UAV)
- Transport: HC-130J Combat King II; C-130J Hercules (MAFFS)

The California Air National Guard (CA ANG) is one of three components of the California National Guard, a reserve of the United States Air Force, and part of the National Guard of the United States.

As militia units, the units in the California Air National Guard are not in the normal United States Air Force chain of command. They are under the jurisdiction of the governor of California through the office of the California Adjutant General unless they are federalized when ordered by the president of the United States. The California National Guard has multiple bases located across the state and the military commander is Brigadier General Michael Johnson.

== Overview ==
Under the "Total Force" concept, California Air National Guard units are considered to be Air Reserve Components (ARC) of the United States Air Force (USAF). California ANG units are trained and equipped by the U.S. Air Force and are operationally gained by a major command of the USAF if federalized. In addition, the California Air National Guard are assigned to Air Expeditionary Forces and are subject to deployment along with their active duty and Air Force Reserve counterparts.

Along with their federal reserve obligations, the California ANG is subject to activation by order of the governor to provide protection of life and property, and preserve peace, order and public safety. State missions include disaster relief in times of earthquakes, hurricanes, floods and forest fires, search and rescue, protection of vital public services, and support to civil defense.

== Components ==
The California Air National Guard consists of the following major units:

- 129th Rescue Wing

Established 3 April 1955; operates: HC-130J Combat King II; HH-60G Pave Hawk
Stationed at: Moffett Air National Guard Base, Mountain View
Gained by: Air Combat Command
The members of the 129th have performed rescues under a variety of conditions - from rough Pacific seas to the rugged Sierra Nevada, using its combination of HC-130 tankers and HH-60 helicopters. Many high-risk lifesaving missions involved long-range, over-water flights, air refueling of helicopters by the HC-130 aircraft, and skilled maneuvering by ships and helicopters to recover patients from the decks of these vessels.

- 144th Fighter Wing

Established 2 June 1948; operates: F-15 Eagle
Stationed at: Fresno Air National Guard Base, Fresno with additional Alert Detachment of South Dakota ANG (114th FW) F-16C Block 30s at March Air Reserve Base, Riverside
Gained by: Air Combat Command
Provides air defense protection for California from the Mexican border to Oregon utilizing the F-15 Eagle and F-16C.

- 146th Airlift Wing

Established 16 June 1924 (as: 115th Observation Squadron); operates: C-130J Hercules (MAFFS)
Stationed at: Channel Islands Air National Guard Station, Oxnard
Gained by: Air Mobility Command
The oldest unit of the CA ANG, the 146th AW provides global military airlift capability to a full spectrum of state and federal agencies.

- 163rd Attack Wing

Established 9 November 1946 (as: 196th Fighter Squadron); operates: MQ-9 Reaper
Stationed at: March Joint Air Reserve Base, Riverside
Gained by: Air Combat Command/Air Education and Training Command
Has 902 members of which roughly 220 are full-time. Currently in transition from a KC-135 Stratotanker air refueling mission to an MQ-1 Predator ISR wing, executing global unmanned aerial systems, combat support, and humanitarian missions.

- 195th Wing

Established 13 May 1948; non-flying unit
Stationed at: Beale Air Force Base, Marysville
Gained by: Air Force Space Command
Responsible for non-flying missions including electronic intelligence, communications, network warfare, space control, and administrative programs.

== History ==
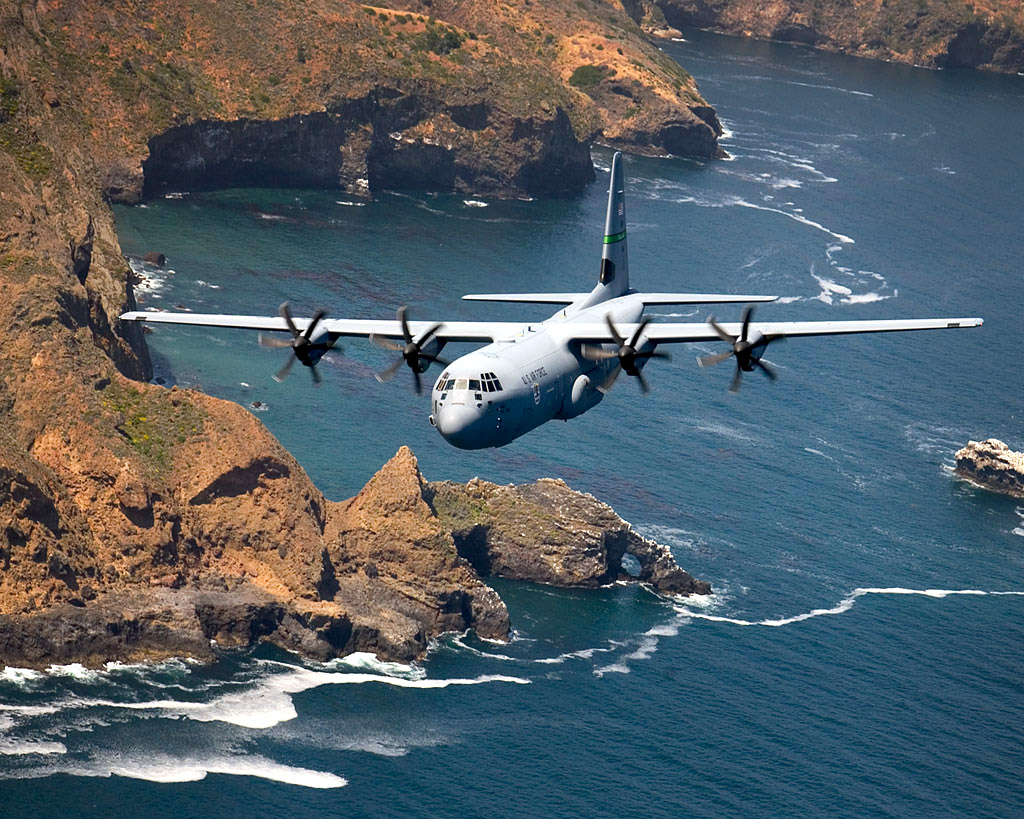
A C-130J Hercules of the 115th Airlift Squadron flying over Santa Cruz Island. The 115th Air Squadron is the oldest unit in the California Air National Guard, having over 80 years of service to the state and nation.

The California Air National Guard origins date to 28 August 1917 with the establishment of the 115th Aero Squadron as part of the World War I United States Army Air Service. The 115th served in France on the Western Front, constructed facilities and engaged in supply and related base support activities then after the 1918 Armistice with Germany was demobilized in 1919.

The Militia Act of 1903 established the present National Guard system, units raised by the states but paid for by the Federal Government, liable for immediate state service. If federalized by Presidential order, they fall under the regular military chain of command. On 1 June 1920, the Militia Bureau issued Circular No.1 on organization of National Guard air units.

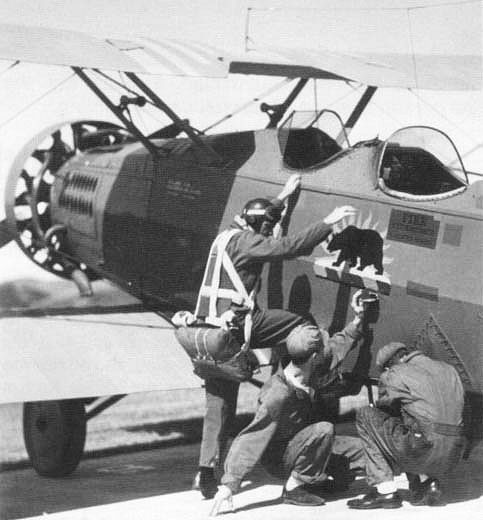
Preparing for a target towing mission at Camp Merriam, now Camp San Luis Obispo, Captain Miller of the 115th Observation Squadron boards an O-38 as mechanics adjust the towing mechanism, 1933

The 115th Observation Squadron was established by the Militia Bureau on 5 April 1924, which authorized the immediate organization of the 115th Observation Squadron, 40th Division of Aviation, California National Guard. Initially the Unit held its meetings at Clover Field, Santa Monica, using Reserve Equipment planes for flying. Later on, the Squadron met at the National Guard Armory and also at the University of Southern California. In 1925, several months after its organization, the Squadron moved to permanent quarters at Griffith Park Aerodrome in Los Angeles. The 115th Observation Squadron was ordered into active United States Army Air Corps service on 3 March 1941 as part of the buildup of the Army Air Corps prior to the United States entry into World War II.

On 24 May 1946, the United States Army Air Forces, in response to dramatic postwar military budget cuts, imposed by President Harry S. Truman, allocated inactive unit designations to the National Guard Bureau for the formation of an Air Force National Guard. These unit designations were allotted and transferred to various State National Guard bureaus to provide them unit designations to re-establish them as Air National Guard units.

The modern California ANG received federal recognition on 1 July 1946 as the 62nd Fighter Wing at Van Nuys Airport, Van Nuys. Its 115th Bombardment Squadron was equipped with A-26 Invader light bombers. On 16 September 1946, its 146th Fighter Group was also formed at Van Nuys, with several fighter squadrons equipped with F-51 Mustangs and its mission was the air defense of the state. 18 September 1947, however, is considered the California Air National Guard's official birth concurrent with the establishment of the United States Air Force as a separate branch of the United States military under the National Security Act

On 4 April 1948 the 61st Fighter Wing with its 144th Fighter Group was formed at Hayward Municipal Airport, Hayward. The 61st's mission was the air defense of Northern California, the 62nd, Southern California.

Today, units of the CA ANG perform a homeland defense mission; worldwide airlift missions, aerial firefighting, combat search and rescue, and Unmanned Aerial (UAV) Reconnaissance missions. The 162nd CCG also maintains tactical communications-electronic facilities, and provides tactical command and control communications services for operational commands supporting US military wartime contingencies.

After the September 11, 2001 terrorist attacks on the United States, elements of every Air National Guard unit in California has been activated in support of the global war on terrorism. Flight crews, aircraft maintenance personnel, communications technicians, air controllers and air security personnel were engaged in Operation Noble Eagle air defense overflights of major United States cities. In December 2007, after the grounding of F-15 fighters due to potential structural problems, the California Air National Guard assumed responsibility for defense of the western United States. This was the first time that a single state's fighter wing took responsibility of defense for an entire coast.

Also, California ANG units have been deployed overseas as part of Operation Enduring Freedom in Afghanistan and Operation Iraqi Freedom in Iraq as well as other locations as directed.

== See also ==
- California Army National Guard
- California State Guard
- California Wing Civil Air Patrol
