= VP-62 (1970–present) =

Patrol Squadron 62
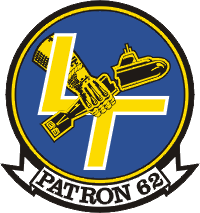
- VP-62 insignia
- Active: 1 November 1970 - present
- Country: United States of America
- Allegiance: Naval Air Force Reserve
- Branch: United States Navy
- Type: Squadron
- Role: Maritime patrol and reconnaissance
- Part of: Maritime Support Wing
- Garrison/HQ: NAS Jacksonville, Florida
- Nickname: Broadarrows

Aircraft flown
- Patrol: SP-2H; P-3A / P-3B / P-3C; P-8A

Patrol Squadron 62 (VP-62) is a combat aviation squadron of the Naval Air Force Reserve. Since 31 July 2015, the squadron has been assigned administratively to Commander, Maritime Support Wing at Naval Air Station North Island, California, an Echelon IV organization under the Commander, Naval Air Force Reserve. However, for operational tasking, the squadron reports to Commander, Patrol and Reconnaissance Wing ELEVEN at Naval Air Station Jacksonville, Florida.

Nicknamed the Broadarrows, the squadron flies the P-8A Poseidon maritime patrol aircraft from its home station of NAS Jacksonville, deploying worldwide. The squadron's aircraft can be identified by the stylized letters "LT" on the vertical stabilizer, the letter "L" being common to all U.S. Atlantic Fleet patrol aircraft, either Regular Navy or Navy Reserve, and the letter "T" being unique to VP-62. The stylized "LT" is also incorporated in the squadron's insignia as worn as a cloth patch on flight suits and flight jackets.

== Overview ==
The current VP-62 was established on 1 November 1970. It is the fourth U.S. Navy squadron to be designated VP-62, the first VP-62 having been disestablished on 1 July 1943, the second VP-62 having been redesignated Patrol Bombing Squadron 62 (VPB-62) on 1 October 1944 and the third VP-62 having been disestablished on 30 January 1950.

VP-62 was established from the personnel and SP-2H Neptune aircraft assets of two Naval Air Reserve patrol squadrons existing prior to November 1970: VP-67F1 and VP-67F2. The establishment of VP-62, other land-based Naval Reserve patrol squadrons, and numerous sea-based Naval Reserve fighter squadrons, attack squadrons, carrier airborne early warning squadrons, helicopter squadrons, etc., all resulted from a major reorganization of the Naval Air Reserve that took place in 1970 in response to problems with the call-up of tactical Naval Air Reserve squadrons and personnel during the USS Pueblo Crisis in 1968. Key among these problems was the incompatibility of aged, obsolescent combat aircraft in the Naval Air Reserve versus the active duty Fleet and an overly bureaucratic process for mobilizing Naval Reserve personnel to active duty. Under this reorganization, combat-coded shore-based and sea-based Naval Air Reserve squadrons, also known as Reserve Force Squadrons (RESFORON), would mirror their active duty Navy squadron counterparts in Naval Aviation and fly the same Type/Model/Series (T/M/S) aircraft as active duty units so that they could readily integrate with the active duty Fleet. These squadrons would be further organized under various Reserve wing organizations that were also created to parallel those in the Regular Navy.

Twelve (12) Naval Reserve patrol squadrons, later increasing to thirteen (13) patrol squadrons, were formed across the Continental United States (CONUS), structured along the same lines as the Regular Navy patrol squadrons and with nearly identical organization and manning levels. The primary distinction between the active duty and reserve squadrons was that the Regular Navy squadrons would continue to be staffed at peacetime manning levels that would be augmented during times of crisis, contingency operations, or wartime by additional Regular Navy and/or Naval Reserve personnel.

In contrast, the Naval Reserve squadrons would have a full wartime-manning complement from the start, with cost savings derived from approximately 66% to 75% of each reserve squadron's manning being filled by part-time Selected Reservists (SELRES) performing 65 man-days to over 150 man-days per person per year and the remaining 25% to 34% of manning filled by full-time active duty Reserve personnel in the Navy's Training and Administration of the Reserve (TAR) program (NOTE: From 2005 to 2021, TAR personnel were known as Full Time Support (FTS) personnel).

The concept known as "12/2/1" had 12 Naval Reserve VP squadrons (later increased to 13 Naval Reserve VP squadrons) residing under two commands: Commander, Reserve Patrol Wing Atlantic (COMRESPATWINGLANT) and Commander, Reserve Patrol Wing Pacific (COMRESPATWINGPAC), both under the control of one central Flag Officer authority, Commander, Naval Air Reserve Force (COMNAVAIRESFOR).

By 1990, VP-62 was comprised nine newly manufactured P-3C Update III aircraft and approximately 400 personnel of which +/- 130 were full-time active duty TAR personnel and +/- 270 were part-time SELRES personnel. This included fifteen (15) fully qualified 12-man combat air crews meeting the same annual flight time and combat readiness requirements as their active duty counterparts. Each combat air crew consisted of three Naval Aviators (pilots), two Naval Flight Officers, and seven enlisted Naval Aircrewmen, the overwhelming majority of whom had extensive prior active duty flight crew experience in the Regular Navy. While stateside at NAS Jacksonville, VP-62 would maintain a duty schedule/flight schedule nearly identical to that of its active duty P-3C squadron counterparts. The only distinction would occur once or twice a month when VP-62 would deviate from the active duty squadrons' Monday through Friday at home schedule and execute a Wednesday through Sunday schedule to accommodate monthly or bi-monthly drill weekends. While deployed to overseas locations, VP-62 would maintain the same 24/7 operational posture as the deployed active duty patrol squadrons.

Post-Cold War force cuts across both the Regular Navy and Naval Reserve from the mid-1990s to the early 2000s, further exacerbated by post-11 September 2001 force cuts to remaining Naval Reserve aviation squadrons as a "bill payer" for the Navy's contribution to funding ground combat unit operations in Southwest Asia, resulted in both Reserve patrol wings and eleven of the original thirteen Naval Reserve (renamed Navy Reserve in 2005) P-3 squadrons being incrementally inactivated. Today, VP-62, along with its Pacific Fleet counterpart Reserve patrol squadron, Patrol Squadron SIXTY-NINE (VP-69) at Naval Air Station Whidbey Island, Washington, are the only two Navy Reserve patrol squadrons still in active service.

Flight crew positions in VP-62, especially for SELRES Naval Aviators and Naval Flight Officers, are highly competitive and selected via an in-depth screening and selection process. All pilots and NFOs have previous active duty experience in Regular Navy Fleet VP squadrons, all are previously mission commander qualified, many are weapons and tactics instructors (WTI) and/or NATOPS instructors, and most have served as instructors in either the P-3 Orion / P-8 Poseidon Fleet Replacement Squadron, Patrol Squadron THIRTY (VP-30); or as flight instructors in the Naval Air Training Command (NATRACOM); or as flight test evaluators in the Operational Test and Evaluation Force (OPTEVFOR) or the Naval Air Systems Command (NAVAIRSYSCOM).

== Operational history ==
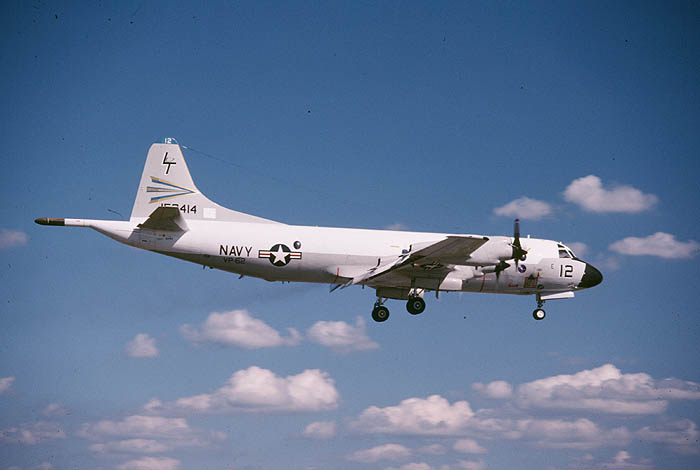
VP-62 P-3B, BuNo 153414, lands at NAS Dallas in September 1984

- 1 November 1970: VP-62 is established at NAS Jacksonville, Florida, under the operational control of Commander, Reserve Patrol Wing Atlantic (COMRESPATWINGLANT), with an additional squadron detachment at NAS Atlanta, Georgia.
- 1 July – 26 September 1971: VP-62 retires its SP-2H aircraft and receives its first P-3A Orion, completing transition training on 26 September.
- 1 April 1972: The VP-62 Atlanta Detachment is disestablished and integrated with the squadron's main body at NAS Jacksonville, combining assets and personnel.
- November 1972: The squadron begins receiving its first P-3A DIFAR-equipped aircraft as replacements for the older P-3A airframes. Transition is completed in late 1973.
- July – September 1975: For the first time, the mini-detachment (mini-det) concept is employed for Reserve VP squadron deployments. Rather than sending the entire squadron overseas for a single 17-day period, small detachments of two or three aircraft are sent to Naval Air Facility Lajes, Azores, for consecutive 17-day periods extending over a period of several months. These VP-62 aircraft augment the deployed active duty Regular Navy P-3 squadron whose aircraft and flight crews are split between NAF Lajes and Naval Station Rota, Spain during a six-month deployment.
- July 1976: VP-62 deploys to Naval Air Station Bermuda. Reserve aircraft and aircrews augment the deployed active duty P-3 squadron at NAS Bermuda and obtain experience in providing additional anti-submarine warfare (ASW) coverage in the Atlantic theater of operation. For the first time for a Naval Reserve patrol squadron, two VP-62 flight crews are selected to drop MK-46 torpedoes with practice warheads in a simulated wartime exercise. Both crews score direct hits on the target.
- 1977 – 1978: Mini-dets deploy over a 24-month period to participate in Colombian Counter Insurgency exercises, a NATO exercise in the Azores, torpedo exercises in Puerto Rico, and Mediterranean exercises based at NAVSTA Rota, Spain.
- February 1978: A VP-62 P-3A flown by a 5-man minimum flight crew from VP-0516, a Naval Reserve Squadron Augmentation Unit (SAU) at NAS Jacksonville, makes a wheels-up landing at the Jacksonville International Airport. The resultant mishap and post-impact fire damages the aircraft beyond economical repair but the entire flight crew escapes without injuries.
- April – June 1978: Numerous mini-dets are deployed during this period, with VP-62 members serving shoulder to shoulder with their Regular Navy counterparts in the Fleet operating from NAF Lajes and NAS Bermuda in tracking Soviet Navy nuclear-powered attack submarines, guided missile submarines, and ballistic missile submarines.
- May – December 1979: VP-62 receives its first P-3B aircraft as a replacement for its older P-3A DIFAR aircraft. All squadron P-3A aircraft are retired and transition to the P-3B aircraft is completed by December.
- 19 May 1980: VP-62 is called upon to provide support during the Cuban refugee resettlement operation (a.k.a. "Mariel Boatlift"). VP-62 flight crews and aircraft maintenance elements are deployed to Naval Air Station Key West, Florida. VP-62 flight crews fly multiple missions from NAS Key West, spotting refugees on the open ocean and directing their rescue by U.S. Navy and U.S. Coast Guard vessels. Squadron personnel are awarded the Humanitarian Service Medal for this effort.
- August 1981: VP-62 deploys to NAS Bermuda. During the two-week period of squadron operations, a record four hurricanes in a row hit Bermuda. Nonetheless, the squadron participates in Exercises OCEAN SAFARI and OCEAN VENTURE with no mission aborts.
- November 1982: VP-62 deploys for annual active duty training to NAS Bermuda, with periodic detachments to Naval Air Station Keflavik, Iceland; Naval Station Roosevelt Roads, Puerto Rico; and NAF Lajes, Azores, Portugal. During the deployment, VP-62 also becomes the first Naval Air Reserve VP squadron to participate in drug interdiction flights in the Caribbean.
- October 1983: VP-62’s P-3B aircraft undergo refit to the Tactical / Navigation Modification (TAC/NAV MOD) update. The Infrared Detection System/Harpoon Aircraft Command and Launch Set (IRDS/HACLS) modifications add infrared detection and the ability to launch the AGM-84 Harpoon air-to-surface anti-ship missile. The completion of these modifications provide VP-62 P-3B aircraft with a Harpoon anti-ship missile capability. The last aircraft modification is completed on 31 March 1985.
- June 1985: With a significant increase in Soviet Navy attack submarine, ballistic missile submarine, and surface intelligence collection ship activity in the vicinity of Bermuda and between Bermuda and the eastern seaboard of the United States, VP-62's P-3B TAC/NAV MOD aircraft, along with Regular Navy P-3C squadrons from NAS Jacksonville; NAS Brunswick, Maine; Canadian Forces CP-140 Aurora aircraft from CFB Greenwood, Nova Scotia; Royal Air Force Nimrod MR2 aircraft from RAF Kinloss in Scotland; and part of a single U.S. Navy S-3A Viking squadron from NAS Cecil Field, Florida, fly from NAS Jacksonville, NAS Norfolk, Virginia, and/or forward deploy to NAS Bermuda to augment the then-deployed Regular Navy P-3C squadron at that location, VP-24.
- 1986: Under an initiative begun by Secretary of the Navy John F. Lehman of assigning newly manufactured combat aircraft direct to the Naval Reserve versus the Navy's traditional method of transferring older used aircraft to the Naval Reserve following years of previous use by the Regular Navy, VP-62 is selected as the first Naval Reserve patrol squadron to receive the new P-3C Update III (P-3C UIII) aircraft. Through bi-partisan efforts with House Armed Services Committee member Rep. Charles Bennett (D-3-FL), VP-62 is selected based on its co-location at NAS Jacksonville with both an active duty P-3C wing of six squadrons, Patrol Wing ELEVEN, and the Atlantic Fleet P-3C Fleet Replacement Squadron (FRS), VP-30, since the majority of VP-62's highly-experienced personnel were often recruited from or had previously served in these units while on active duty. A similar rationale is later applied to the transition of VP-91 at Naval Air Station Moffett Field, California to newly-built P-3C Update III aircraft due to VP-91's co-location with Patrol Wing TEN and the Pacific Fleet P-3C FRS, VP-31.
- 1987: VP-62 commences retirement of its P-3B TAC/NAV MOD aircraft in preparation for transition to the P-3C Update III.
- 1 April 1987 – 31 Mar 1989: VP-62 aircrews commence transition training to the P-3C Update III aircraft with training being done by the active duty Fleet Replacement Squadrons (FRS), VP-30 at NAS Jacksonville and VP-31 at NAS Moffett Field, California. Intent is to equip both VP-62 and its sister Pacific Fleet Reserve squadron, VP-91 at NAS Moffett Field, California with new production P-3C UIII aircraft given their location on active duty P-3C bases with collocated Fleet Replacement Squadrons and to leverage the extensive operational experience of VP-62 and VP-91 flight crews, which consists of large numbers of former instructor pilots, instructor Naval Flight Officers, and instructor enlisted aircrewmen previously assigned to VP-30 and VP-31 on active duty. The P-3C UIII aircraft have an entirely new underwater acoustic monitoring system, doubling the number of sonobuoys that could be monitored concurrently over earlier versions of the P-3C. Improvements also include avionics, AN/AYA-8 computers, upgraded cooling systems, a retractable AN/AAS-36 IRDS turret aft of the forward radome under the aircraft's chin, and AGM-84 Harpoon missile capability.

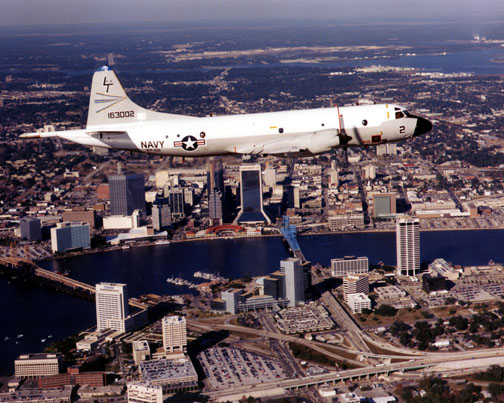
VP-62 P-3C UIII, BuNo 163002, over downtown Jacksonville in 1991

- November 1987: Delivery of the first new production aircraft P-3C UIII aircraft to VP-62 direct from the manufacturer, Lockheed Aircraft Company, occurs in November 1987. This aircraft and all subsequent new production model P-3C UIII aircraft for both VP-62 and VP-91 are procured with National Guard and Reserve Equipment Account (NGREA) funding.
- 14 June 1988: VP-62 fires its first AGM-84 Harpoon air-to-surface missile during a live-fire Fleet Exercise (FLEETEX). The missile is the first AGM-84 ever fired by a Naval Reserve aircrew from a P-3C UIII aircraft. It scores a direct hit, sinking the target, a former U.S. Army Corps of Engineers barge.
- 31 March 1989: VP-62 completes transition to the P-3C UIII, marking the first time in U.S. Navy patrol aviation history that a Naval Reserve patrol squadron has received the latest state-of-the-art maritime patrol and reconnaissance aircraft direct from the manufacturer (aircraft Bureau Numbers (BuNo) 163001 - 163005 and BuNo 163289 - 163292).
- 15–31 July 1989: VP-62 becomes the first patrol squadron in either the Regular Navy or the Naval Reserve to deploy to NAVSTA Rota and NAF Lajes with the P-3C UIII aircraft. The deployment also marks the first time a Naval Reserve squadron has deployed the P-3C UIII for overseas active duty training and operational support. The overwhelming success of this and subsequent deployments highlights the advanced capability of the P-3C Update III and demonstrates the Naval Reserve's ability to effectively operate and maintain front-line combat aircraft in the most challenging real-world environments.
- 1990 - 1 May 1994: VP-62 resumes drug interdiction flights in the Caribbean, commencing concurrent support to the U.S. Coast Guard and Commander, Joint Task Force FOUR (CJTF 4), deploying to NAVSTA Roosevelt Roads and NAS Key West, Florida in support of multiple counter-narcotics (CN) interdiction operations.
- 1990 - 2013: VP-62 performs multiple stateside and overseas mini-dets for two, three, and four-week periods, operating from NAS Keflavik, Iceland; Thule Air Base, Greenland; RAF Kinloss, United Kingdom; RAF Mildenhall, United Kingdom; RAF Fairford, United Kingdom; NAF Lajes, Azores; NAVSTA Rota, Spain; NAS Sigonella, Sicily; NAS Bermuda, British Crown Colony; NAVSTA Roosevelt Roads, Puerto Rico; Manta, Ecuador; Comalapa, El Salvador; MCAS Kaneohe Bay, Hawaii; NAS North Island, California, and NAS Key West, Florida.
- July 1991: With the end of the Cold War and looming defense budget reductions, the last production model P-3C UIII, BuNo 163295, is delivered to VP-91 in April 1990, terminating all P-3C production for the U.S. Navy. Acquisition of additional P-3C UIII aircraft for VP-62 and VP-91 with NGREA funding is also curtailed and VP-62 is subsequently directed to transfer two of its newest aircraft, BuNo 163290 and BuNo 163291, to VP-91. Revised intent is for VP-62 and VP-91 to operate seven (7) P-3C UIII production model aircraft each, to be augmented by two (2) older P-3C Baseline aircraft with the Sensor Update System (SUDS) modification, redesignated as P-3C UIIIR.
- July 1991: Despite its procurement with NGREA funds, VP-62 is directed by the Office of the Chief of Naval Operations (OPNAV) to transfer one of its production model P-3C Update III aircraft, BuNo 163293, to VP-16, an active duty Regular Navy patrol squadron at NAS Jacksonville. This would be the first of several transfers over the next few years of production model P-3C UIII aircraft in VP-62 and VP-91 that were procured with dedicated Reserve Component equipment (i.e., NGREA) funds to the Regular Navy, the Reserve squadrons' P-3C UIII aircraft having lower total flight hours than active duty P-3C UII, UII.5 and UIII-R aircraft that were aging out and being retired. Both Reserve squadrons, VP-62 and VP-91, would subsequently receive additional older, higher flight hour P-3C UIII-R aircraft previously operated by Regular Navy VP squadrons. VP-91 would later be inactivated on 31 March 1999 due to Naval Reserve budget cuts and its aircraft redistributed to Regular Navy patrol squadrons and to the Naval Reserve's VP-69 at NAS Whidbey Island, Washington.
- 1993 - 1996: VP-62 flight crews and maintenance detachments staging from NAS Sigonella successively participate in Operation Maritime Monitor, Operation Maritime Guard and Operation Sharp Guard in the Adriatic in the vicinity of the former Yugoslavia. Participating squadron personnel are awarded the Armed Forces Service Medal.
- May 1993: With changes in federal law removing the combat aircraft restrictions on female military flight crew personnel, VP-62 becomes the first Navy patrol squadron, Active or Reserve, to have a female assigned as a member of a combat air crew. Lieutenant Commander Kay Hire, a Naval Flight Officer who previously flew the RP-3A and RP-3D variants of the P-3 Orion in Oceanographic Development Squadron EIGHT (VXN-8) at NAS Patuxent River, Maryland and was an instructor navigator in the USAF T-43A with the Naval Air Training Unit (NAVAIRTU) embedded with the 323rd Flying Training Wing (323 FTW) at Mather AFB, California, was selected for duty with VP-62 as a P-3C UIII navigator/communicator. LCDR Hire would later become a NASA Mission Specialist astronaut, promoting to Commander and later to Captain, flying missions STS-90 in 1998 and STS-130 in 2010.
- 1994: VP-62 commences training for employment of the AGM-84E Standoff Land Attack Missile (SLAM) variant of the Harpoon.
- 7 April 1994 – 1 May 1999: CJTF 4 is redesignated Joint Interagency Task Force East JIATF East. VP-62 support to JIATF East for CN operations continues from NAVSTA Roosevelt Roads and NAS Key West through 1 May 1999.

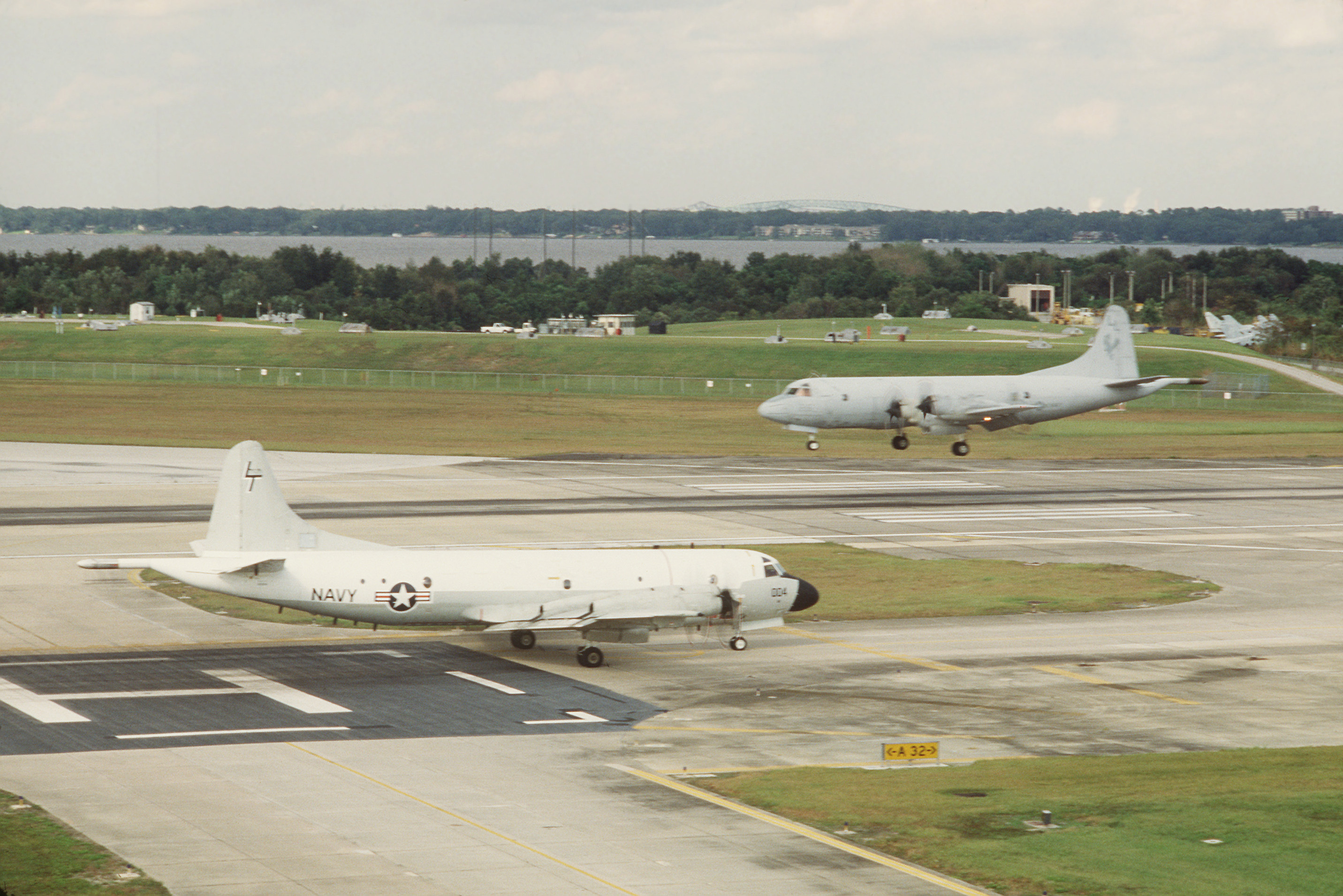
VP-62 P-3C UIII, BuNo 163004, taxis to Runway 9 at NAS Jacksonville while a VP-30 P-3C lands, circa 1995. The VP-62 aircraft is still in its legacy Cold War gloss white over gloss gray paint scheme, albeit with most markings removed. During its next depot level maintenance period, it would be repainted in the flat gray tactical paint scheme with subdued markings like the VP-30 aircraft pictured.

- August - September 1994: VP-62 participates in Operations Support Democracy and Uphold Democracy, the U.S. military intervention in Haiti, while operating from NAVSTA Roosevelt Roads and NAS Key West. Participating squadron personnel are awarded the Armed Forces Expeditionary Medal.
- 1996: VP-62 is awarded the Noel Davis Trophy and the Battle Efficiency Award (Navy Battle "E").
- January 1999: Following the inactivation of Commander, Reserve Patrol Wing Pacific (COMRESPATWINGPAC) following the BRAC-directed closure of the former NAS Moffett Field, California, VP-62's higher echelon command, Commander, Reserve Patrol Wing Atlantic (COMRESPATWINGLANT) at NAS Norfolk, Virginia is renamed Commander, Reserve Patrol Wing (COMRESPATWING), consolidating the remaining nine (of an original thirteen) Atlantic Fleet and Pacific Fleet Naval Reserve P-3 squadrons under a single Echelon IV command.
- 1 May 1999 – Present: JIATF East merges with Joint Interagency Task Force South, with the merged JIATF South placed under Commander, U.S. Southern Command (USSOUTHCOM). VP-62 continues to support JIATF South for CN operations from NAS Jacksonville, NAS Key West, and forward operating bases in Central and South America.
- 2000: VP-62 aircraft, BuNo 163289, is the first VP-62 P-3C UIII aircraft inducted into the Lockheed Martin facility at Greenville, South Carolina for modifications under the P-3C Anti-Surface Warfare Improvement Program (AIP). Squadron flight crews commence training to employ the AGM-84H/K Standoff Land Attack Missile-Expanded Response (AGM-84H/K SLAM-ER) variant of the Harpoon and the AGM-65 Maverick air-to-surface missile, capabilities VP-62 will gain with conversion to the P-3C AIP.
- 2003: VP-62 commences upgrade of its P-3C UIII / P-3C AIP aircraft under the, to be followed by later transition to the "BMUP-Plus" (BMUP+).
- 10 July 2003: A ground mishap and subsequent interior cockpit and cabin fire is sustained by VP-62 P-3C BuNo 163005 during routine servicing of the aircraft's oxygen system. The interior fire damages the aircraft's fuselage and cabin interior beyond economical repair and the aircraft is scrapped on site, with most major components (i.e., engines, wings, etc.) being used to maintain and support the remaining Regular Navy and Naval Reserve P-3C fleet. Cause of the mishap is determined to be an internal failure of the oxygen manifold, causing auto-ignition from the aircraft's auxiliary power unit. This potential had been recently identified in the P-3C fleet and an airframe change (AFC) to modify all U.S. Navy and Allied nation P-3C aircraft to preclude occurrence of this type of mishap had been promulgated and was in effect. However, Regular Navy P-3C aircraft were given precedence for modification under this AFC over Naval Reserve aircraft, this despite the majority of P-3C aircraft in the Regular Navy inventory being far older than BuNo 163005.
- 2005: The U.S. Naval Reserve is renamed the U.S. Navy Reserve. Naval Air Reserve Jacksonville (NAVAIRES JAX), an Echelon IV command that provided administrative support to VP-62 and other Naval Air Reserve aviation squadrons at NAS Jacksonville and Naval Station Mayport as Local Area Coordinator for Air (LACAIR), is downgraded to an Echelon V command, merged with Naval Reserve Center Jacksonville, and renamed Navy Operational Support Center Jacksonville (NOSC Jacksonville) under the Navy's Active-Reserve Integration (ARI) initiative. All active duty Training and Administration of the Reserve (TAR) personnel assigned to the squadron are redesignated Full Time Support (FTS) personnel.
- 2007: COMRESPATWING is inactivated and VP-62 is reassigned to the active duty Navy's Commander, Patrol and Reconnaissance Wing ELEVEN (COMPATRECONWING ELEVEN) at NAS Jacksonville under the Navy's Active-Reserve Integration (ARI) initiative. COMRESPATWING's former higher command echelon, COMNAVAIRESFOR is redesignated Commander, Naval Air Force Reserve (COMNAVAIRFORES or CNAFR) and relocates from Naval Air Station Joint Reserve Base New Orleans, Louisiana to NAS North Island, California as a subordinate command under the active duty Commander, Naval Air Forces (CNAF).
- 2006: VP-62 is awarded the Noel Davis Trophy and the Battle Efficiency Award (Navy Battle "E") for 2005.
- 2007: VP-62 is awarded the Noel Davis Trophy and the Battle Efficiency Award (Navy Battle "E") for 2006.
- 2008: VP-62 is awarded the Noel Davis Trophy and the Battle Efficiency Award (Navy Battle "E") for 2007.
- 2009: VP-62 is awarded the Noel Davis Trophy and the Battle Efficiency Award (Navy Battle "E") for 2008. VP-62 was also awarded the 2008 Chief of Naval Operations Safety Award known as the Safety "S" for an outstanding squadron safety program. The squadron is also awarded a Blue "M" for medical readiness.
- 15 September 2009: VP-62 is awarded the Department of the Navy Safety Excellence Award.
- 2010: VP-62 participates in Exercise Rim of the Pacific (RIMPAC) 2010, staging from Marine Corps Air Station Kaneohe Bay, Hawaii. During RIMPAC, VP-62 participates in a Sink Exercise (SINKEX), firing an AGM-84D Harpoon missile with a live warhead against the decommissioned amphibious assault ship, ex-USS New Orleans (LPH-11).

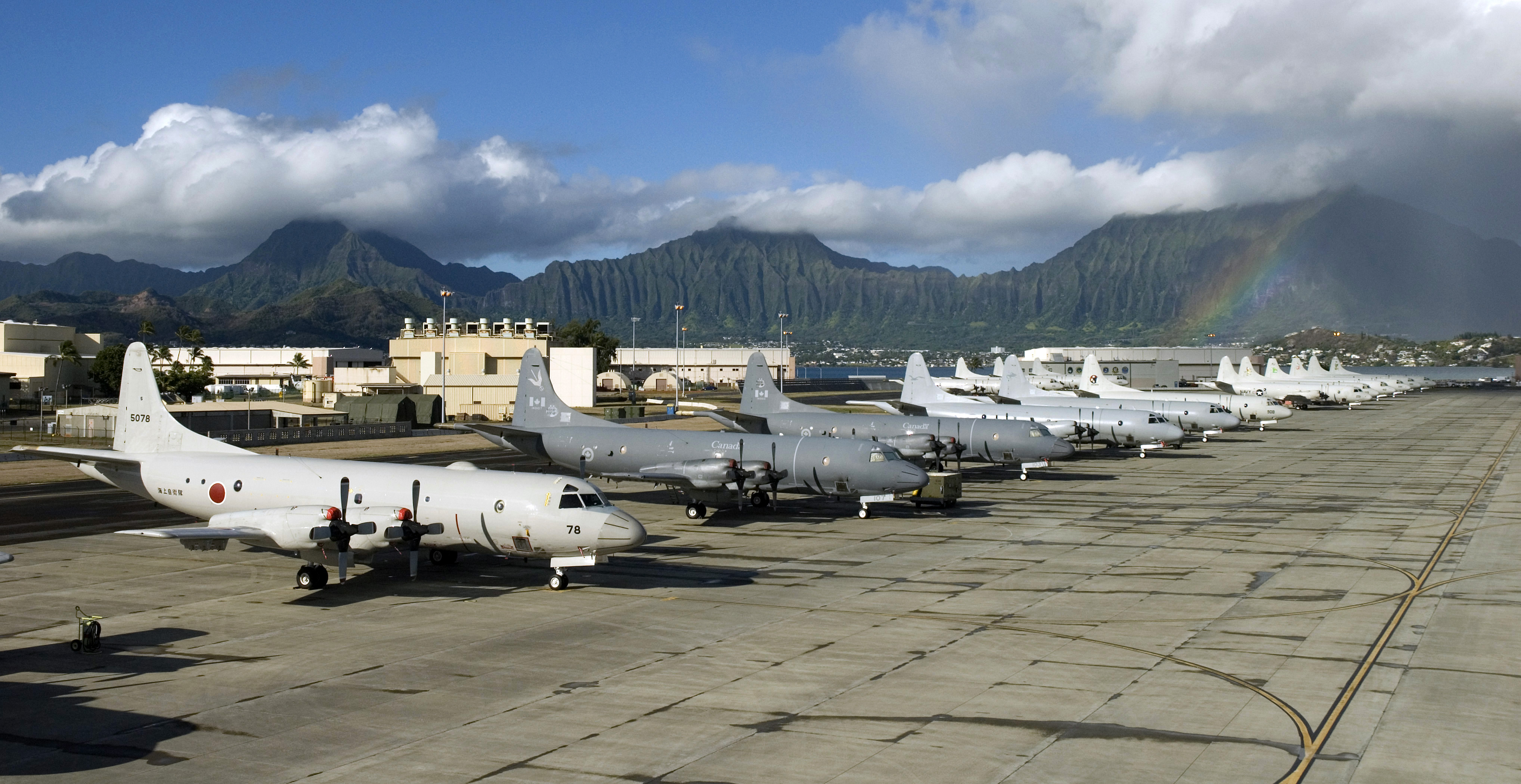
P-3C Orions of the U.S. Navy and partner nations on the tarmac at MCAS Kaneohe Bay during RIMPAC 2010

- 2011: VP-62 is awarded the Battle Efficiency Award (Navy Battle "E") and another Chief of Naval Operations Naval Aviation Safety Award (i.e., Safety "S") for 2011.
- 2012: VP-62 participates in Exercise Rim of the Pacific (RIMPAC) 2012, staging from MCAS Kaneohe Bay, Hawaii.
- July 2013: VP-62 is mobilized to active duty and forward deployed to Kadena Air Base, Okinawa, Japan under Commander, Patrol and Reconnaissance Wing ONE / Commander, Task Force 72 and Commander, Task Group 72.2, marking the Navy's first-ever full activation of an entire Navy Reserve P-3 patrol squadron for a six-month overseas deployment. Also mobilized for this deployment is one of the U.S. Navy's last Cold War P-3C Naval Aircrewmen still in uniform and VP-62's former Command Master Chief Petty Officer and most senior enlisted member, AWCM (NAC/AW) Spence Cunningham. Master Chief Cunningham initially enlisted in the U.S. Navy in 1981.
- November 2013: Aircrews from VP-62 participate in Operation Damayan, the U.S. military's humanitarian aid response to the Republic of the Philippines following Typhoon Haiyan. Under Commander, Task Group 72.2, VP-62 crews provide initial post-storm reconnaissance and identify potential landing areas for U.S. Navy MH-60 Seahawk and U.S. Marine Corps MV-22 Osprey aircraft to land and deliver relief supplies.
- 11 December 2013: VP-62 returns to its home station of NAS Jacksonville following a six-month deployment in the U.S. Pacific Command (USPACOM) Area of Responsibility.
- June 2014 - January 2015: VP-62 establishes a detachment in the USCENTCOM Area of Responsibility (AOR) at Al Udeid Air Base, Qatar, flying missions over Iraq in support of the American-led intervention in Iraq (2014–present) against the Islamic State of Iraq and the Levant (ISIL). The squadron also establishes an additional detachment in the USSOUTHCOM AOR at Comalapa International Airport, El Salvador in support of USSOUTHCOM taskings in Central and South America.
- 31 July 2015: VP-62 is reassigned from the control of the active duty Navy's Commander, Patrol and Reconnaissance Wing ELEVEN (CPRW-11) at NAS Jacksonville to the Naval Air Force Reserve's Commander, Maritime Support Wing (CMSW) at NAS North Island, California.
- 2015: VP-62 is partially mobilized to active duty and forward deployed to Kadena AB, Okinawa, Japan for six months under Commander, Task Force 72.
- 2016: With the transition of increasing numbers of Regular Navy P-3C patrol squadrons to the P-8A Poseidon aircraft and delays in the incorporation of the AN/APS-154 Advanced Airborne Sensor in the P-8A, VP-62 receives several P-3C aircraft from Regular Navy squadrons that have been modified to carry the AN/APS-149 Littoral Surveillance Radar System (LSRS), adding the LSRS mission set to the squadron's multi-mission portfolio.
- 2017: VP-62 is partially mobilized to active duty and forward deployed to Kadena AB, Okinawa, Japan for six months under Commander, Task Force 72. This same year, VP-62 surpasses 37 years and 109,000 hours of mishap-free flying.
- April 2018: Commander H. E. Cochran assumes command of VP-62. A Naval Flight Officer, she is the squadron's first female Commanding Officer (CO), having previously served as the Executive Officer (XO).
- July 2018: VP-62 participates in Exercise Rim of the Pacific (RIMPAC) 2018, staging from Marine Corps Base Hawaii (former MCAS Kaneohe Bay, Hawaii).
- October 2019: VP-62 transitions to operating strictly P-3C BMUP+ aircraft, the only P-3C variant capable of employing the AN/APS-149 LSRS.
- 2020: VP-62 is partially mobilized to active duty and forward deployed to Kadena AB, Okinawa, Japan for six months under Commander, Task Force 72.
- October 2020: Commander Katharine B. Sears assumes command of VP-62. A Naval Flight Officer, CDR Sears is the first female FTS officer to serve as Commanding Officer (CO) of VP-62. She previously served as the squadron's Executive Officer (XO) prior to assuming command.
- April 2021: VP-62 and VP-69 conclude the P-3C's final operational deployment with the U.S. Navy and the Naval Air Force Reserve. Originally planned as a 12-month deployment shared by both VP-69 and VP-62, the requirement was extended to the 18-month mark in order to fill critical Global Force Management (GFM) requirements while the Regular Navy continues to procure the requisite number of AN/APS-154 Advanced Airborne Sensors for the P-8A Poseidon. Throughout the 18 months supporting Commander, U.S. 7th Fleet from Kadena AB, Japan, the squadrons flew 277 missions and 1944.9 hours in support of LSRS maritime operations. In April 2021 all of VP-62 and VP-69 personnel and hardware returned safely to their home stations of NAS Jacksonville and NAS Whidbey Island. The final two P-3C BMUP+ aircraft to leave Kadena AB were BuNos 161415 and 161587 of VP-69.
- October 2021: Commander, Patrol and Reconnaissance Group (COMPATRECONGRU) announces that VP-62 will fly its final flight with the P-3C in May 2022 and then commence transition to the P-8A Poseidon.
- Nov 2021: All active duty FTS personnel assigned to VP-62 return to their original designation as Training and Administration of the Reserve (TAR) personnel. Navy Operational Support Center Jacksonville (NOSC JAX), the Echelon V command that replaced the former Echelon IV command Naval Air Reserve Jacksonville (NAVAIRES JAX) as Local Area Coordinator for Air (LACAIR) in late 2005, is redesignated as Navy Reserve Center Jacksonville (NRC JAX) and continues to provide Reserve-specific administrative support to VP-62.
- June 2022: VP-62 retires its last P-3C aircraft. Squadron personnel commence P-8A transition training at VP-30.
- 22 April 2023: VP-62 becomes the first P-8A squadron in the Naval Air Reserve, conducting an official P-8A "rollout ceremony" at NAS Jacksonville presided over by the squadron CO, Commander Matt Piro, and the Chief of the Navy Reserve, Vice Admiral John Mustin. As of this date, the squadron has two P-8A aircraft assigned and will eventually fly and maintain a total of six P-8As.

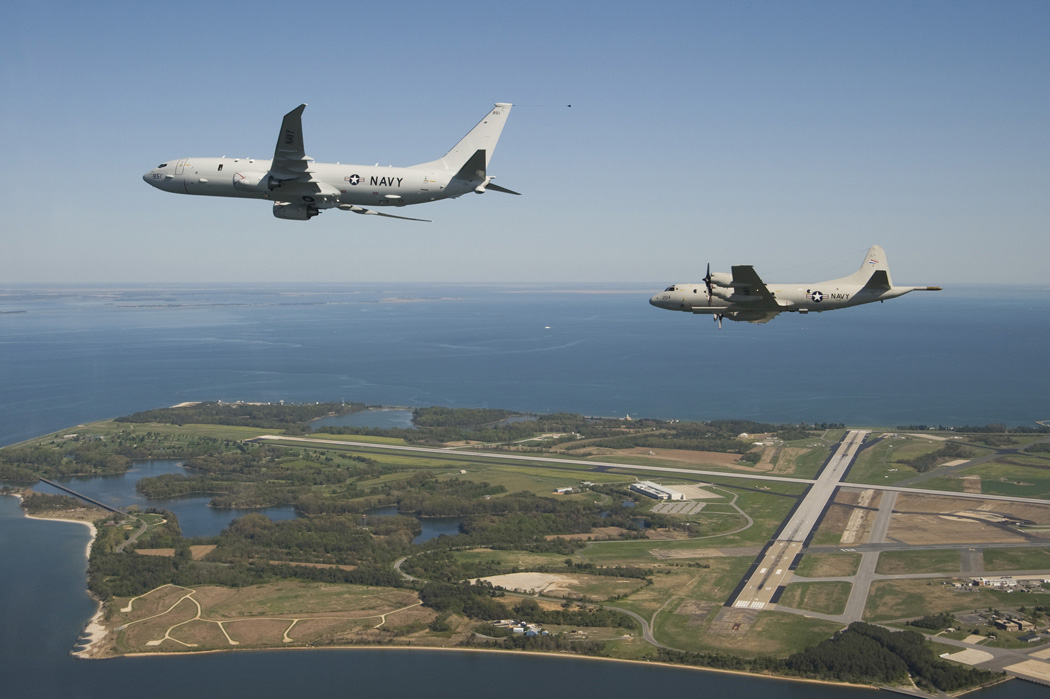
A P-8A Poseidon flies formation with a P-3C Orion overhead Naval Air Station Patuxent River, Maryland, 2010

== Aircraft assignments ==
The squadron has been assigned the following aircraft, effective on the dates shown:

- SP-2H - November 1970 - July 1971
- P-3A - July 1971 - November 1972
- P-3A DIFAR - November 1972 - May 1979
- P-3B - May 1979 - November 1983
- P-3B TAC/NAV MOD - November 1983 - May 1988 (P-3B operated in tandem with P-3C Update III during squadron transition, November 1987 - May 1988)
- P-3C Update III - November 1987 - 2000 (includes production model P-3C Update III aircraft beginning in 1987 and additional former P-3C Baseline aircraft updated to P-3C Update IIIR standard commencing in July 1994; all extant aircraft began modification to AIP standard commencing in 2000)
- P-3C AIP - 2000 - 2003
- P-3C BMUP and BMUP+ - 2003 - 2019
- P-3C BMUP+ - 2019 – 2021
- P-8A - 2022 – present

== Home port assignments ==
The squadron was assigned to these home ports, effective on the dates shown:

- NAS Jacksonville, Florida - 1 November 1970 – Present
  - Additional VP-62 Det Atlanta at NAS Atlanta, Georgia - 1 November 1970 – 1 April 1972

== See also ==
- Maritime patrol aircraft
- List of United States Navy aircraft squadrons
- List of inactive United States Navy aircraft squadrons
- List of squadrons in the Dictionary of American Naval Aviation Squadrons
- History of the United States Navy
