= List of military squadrons and aircraft based at Moffett Field =

== 1931–1935: The USS Macon years ==
From – To	Branch of service	Unit	Duty	Aircraft	Insignia
1933, October 15 – 1935, February 12	USN	rigid airship	Coastal surveillance	USS Macon (ZRS-5)	
1933, October 15 – 1935, February 12	USN	Parasite aircraft	Coastal surveillance	Curtiss F9C Sparrowhawk	
1933, October 15 – 1935, February 12	USN	Parasite aircraft	Training and support	Consolidated Fleet N2Y-1 trainer	
1934 – 1935, February 12	USN	Parasite aircraft	Training and support	Waco UBF XJW-1	
1935, July	USN	VA?-?	Reconnaissance Squadron (Operated from Moffett on a trial basis)		
1935, July	USN	VS-2	Antisubmarine Reconnaissance Scout Squadron (Operated from Moffett on a trial basis)	Curtiss SB2C Helldiver	
1935, July	USN	VF-6	Fighter Squadron (Operated from Moffett on a trial basis)	Boeing FB-5 Boeing F2B Boeing F4B	
1935, July	USN	VB-2	Bomb Squadron (Operated from Moffett on a trial basis)	Curtiss F11C Goshawk Vought SB2U Vindicator	
1935, July	USN	VT-2 "Doerbirds"	Training Squadron (Operated from Moffett on a trial basis)	T-6B	

== 1935–1943: Army Air Corps Training Base Sunnyvale, CA ==
From – To	Branch of Service	Unit	Duty	Aircraft	Insignia
1935, September – 1942, January	United States Army Air Corps	West Coast Air Corps Training Center	Training Squadron	Vultee BT-13 Valiant	

== 1942–1947: WWII Blimps and Gas Balloon operations ==
From – to	Branch of service	Unit	Duty	Aircraft	Insignia
1942, January 1947, August	USN	Fleet Airship Wing Three Training	Lighter Than Air Training	L-class blimps, M-class blimps	
1942, January 1947, August	USN	ZP-32	Lighter Than Air Patrol Ship Squadron	TC-class blimps, K-class blimps	
1942, January 1947, August	Goodyear		Assembly of lighter-than-air craft. 39 blimps delivered	G-class blimps, L-class blimps, K-class blimps	

== 1943–1953: Naval Patrol heavier than air operations ==
From – to	Branch of service	Unit	Duty	Aircraft	Insignia
1942, January 1947, August	USN	VJ-14	Utility / Meteorological Squadron	Martin B-26 Marauder	
1942, January 1947, August	USN	VJ-18	Utility / Meteorological Squadron	Martin B-26 Marauder	
1944–1945	USN	VPB-142	Patrol Bomber Squadron	Lockheed PV-1 Ventura; Lockheed PV-2 Harpoon; Martin B-26 Marauder	
1944–1945	USN	VAQ-?	Reconnaissance Squadrons	Lockheed PV-1 Ventura; Lockheed PV-2 Harpoon; Martin B-26 Marauder; Vought OS2U Kingfisher; Ryan FR-1 Fireball	

== 1945–1967: NATS, MATS & MAC ==
From – To	Branch of Service	Unit	Duty	Aircraft	Insignia
1945–1967	USN	Naval Air Transport Service (NATS) Headquarters	Transport Squadron NATS, MATS, & MAC		
1945–1967	USN	VR-3	Transport Squadron	R4Ds (DC-3s) R6D(DC-6s)	
1945–1967	USN	VR-4	Transport Squadron	R4Ds (DC-3s), R5D (DC-5s), R6D (DC-6s)	
1945–1967	USN	VR-5	Transport Squadron	R4Ds (DC-3s), R5D (DC-5s) and R6D (DC-6s)	
1957–1967	USN	VR-7	Transport Squadron	Lockheed R7V Super Constellation	
1957–1967	USN	VR-8	Transport Squadron	Lockheed R7V Super Constellation	
1945–1967	USN	VR-44	Transport Squadron	Lockheed R6V Constitution	

== 1953–1963: US Navy's first Master Jet base – Carrier Squadrons ==
From – to	Branch of Service	Unit	Duty	Aircraft	Insignia
1952–1961	USN	CAG-15	Carrier Air Group	Douglas AD Skyraider	
1952–1961	USN	CAG-19	Carrier Air Group	Douglas AD Skyraider	
1955–1961	USN	CAG-21	Carrier Air Group	Douglas AD Skyraider	
1956–1958	USMC	Air Task Group 3	Marine Air-Ground Task Force	Douglas AD Skyraider	
1955–1959	USMC	Air Task Group 4	Marine Air-Ground Task Force	Douglas AD Skyraider	
1950s - 1 July 1959	USN	VA-25 “Tigers”	Strike Fighter Squadron	Douglas AD Skyraider; F9F Cougar FJ-3 Fury	
1962–1963	USN	VA-52 “Knightriders”	Strike Fighter Squadron	Douglas AD Skyraider; F9F Cougar; FJ-3 Fury	
1950s-November 30, 1949	USN	VA-94 “Mighty Shrikes”	Strike Fighter Squadron	Douglas AD Skyraider; F9F Cougar; FJ-3 Fury	
1962–1963	USN	VA-95 “Green Lizards”	Strike Fighter Squadron	A-4 Skyhawk	
1956–1958	USN	VA-96 "Eagles"	Strike Fighter Squadron	Douglas AD Skyraider; F9F Cougar; FJ-3 Fury	
1961–1963	USN	VA-115 “Arabs”	Strike Fighter Squadron	Douglas AD Skyraider; F9F Cougar; FJ-3 Fury	
1961–1963	USN	VA-122 "Flying Eagles"	Strike Fighter Squadron	Douglas AD Skyraider; F9F Cougar; FJ-3 Fury	
1956 – April 10, 1958	USN	VA-125 “Rough Raiders”	Strike Fighter Squadron	Douglas AD Skyraider; F9F Cougar; FJ-3 Fury	
1962–1963	USN	VA-145 “Swordsmen”	Strike Fighter Squadron	Douglas AD Skyraider; F9F Cougar; FJ-3 Fury	

== 1963–1994: US Navy's West Coast P-3 Orion Center ==
From – To	Branch of Service	Unit	Duty	Aircraft	Insignia
1963, January −1993	USN	West Coast Commander U.S. Patrol Wings Pacific Fleet (COMATWINGSPAC)	West Coast Center Orion Patrol Squadron	Lockheed P-3 Orion	
1963, January −1993	USN	Commander Patrol Wing TEN (COMPATWING 10)	West Coast Center Orion Patrol Squadron	Lockheed P-3 Orion	
1963, January −1993	USN	Naval Air Reserve, Commander Reserve Patrol Wing Pacific (COMRESPATWINGPAC)	West Coast Center Orion Patrol Squadron	Lockheed P-3 Orion	
1963, January −1993	USN	Naval Air Reserve, Patrol Wing FOUR (COMPATWING 4)	West Coast Center Orion Patrol Squadron	Lockheed P-3 Orion	
1963, January −1993	USN	VP-31 "Black Lightnings/Genies"	Patrol Squadron	Lockheed P-3 Orion	
1963, January −1993	USN	VP-9 "Golden Eagles"	Patrol Squadron	Lockheed P-3 Orion	
1963, January −1993	USN	VP-19 "Big Red"	Patrol Squadron	Lockheed P-3 Orion	1987 1976 1964
1963, January −1993	USN	VP-40 "Fighting Marlins"	Patrol Squadron	Lockheed P-3 Orion	
1963, January −1993	USN	VP-46 "Grey Knights"	Patrol Squadron	Lockheed P-3 Orion	
1963, January −1993	USN	VP-47 "The Golden Swordsmen"	Patrol Squadron	Lockheed P-3 Orion	
1963, May −1991	USN	VP-48 "The Boomerangers"	Patrol Squadron	Lockheed P-3 Orion	
1963, January −1993	USN	VP-50 "Blue Dragons"	Patrol Squadron	Lockheed P-3 Orion	
1963, January −1993	USN	VP-91 "Black Cats"	Patrol Squadron	Lockheed P-3 Orion	
1963, January −1993	USN	VR-55 "Minutemen"	Transport Squadron	Lockheed KC-130T Hercules	

== Current ==
From – To	Branch of service	Unit	Duty	Aircraft	Insignia
2000–present	USAF	129th Rescue Wing	Rescue Squadron	Lockheed MC-130P Combat Shadow variants of the C-130 Hercules	
2000–present	USAF	129th Rescue Wing	Rescue Squadron	HH-60G Pave Hawk rescue helicopters	

== See also ==
- List of United States Navy aircraft squadrons
- List of inactive United States Navy aircraft squadrons
- List of United States Navy aircraft designations (pre-1962)
