= VP-30 =

United States Navy aviation squadron

VP-30 Pro's Nest
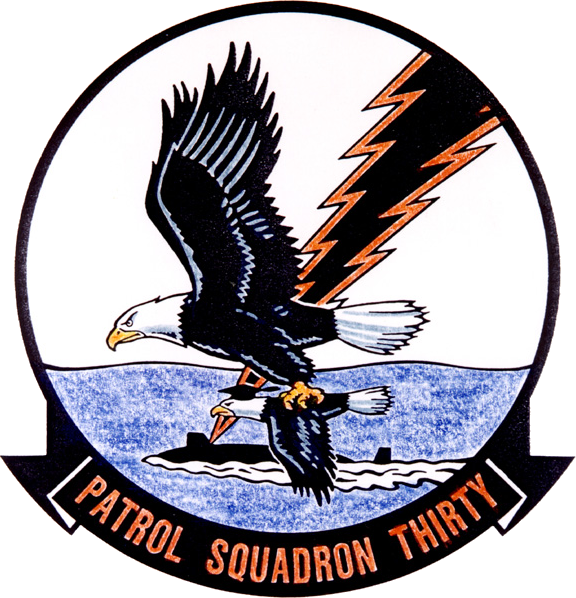
- VP-30 Unit Insignia
- Active: 30 June 1960 – Present
- Country: United States of America
- Branch: United States Navy
- Type: Patrol
- Role: Fleet Replacement Squadron (FRS)
- Garrison/HQ: Naval Air Station Jacksonville
- Nickname: Pro's Nest (1960 – present)
- Patron: Thirty
- Colors: Royal Blue
- Equipment: P-8A Poseidon; MQ-4C Triton

Insignia
- Tail Code: LL (30 June 1960 – present)

Aircraft flown
- Patrol: P2V-5F/FS/7S/SP-2E/H; P5M-1/1S/2/2S/SP-5B; P-3A/B/C; P-8A

Patrol and Reconnaissance Squadron 30 (VP-30) is a maritime patrol squadron of the United States Navy, established on 30 June 1960. It is based at Naval Air Station Jacksonville, Florida.

== Mission ==
VP-30's mission is to provide Boeing P-8A Poseidon specific training to Naval Aviators, Naval Flight Officers, and enlisted Naval Aircrewman prior to reporting to the fleet. More than 650 staff personnel train over 800 officer and enlisted personnel annually, utilizing 10 P-8A aircraft. In addition to U.S. Navy enlisted, officer and NOAA Commissioned Officer Corps personnel, foreign military personnel from Australia, Canada, Japan, the Netherlands, Norway, Germany, Spain, Argentina, Thailand, Chile, and the Republic of Korea have all received specific aircrew and maintenance training on different variants of the P-3 at VP-30. In addition, military personnel from the United Kingdom, Australia, New Zealand and Norway currently receive training from VP-30 on the P-8.

== History ==
VP-30 was established on 30 June 1960 at NAS Jacksonville, Florida under the operational control of Fleet Air Wing 11 (FAW-11). The squadron was organized to be a fleet replacement squadron (FRS) of the U.S. Atlantic Fleet, providing training on non-carrier based anti-submarine (ASW) aircraft, and ensuring a continuous flow of operationally qualified pilots, naval aviation observers, enlisted aircrew and maintenance personnel to fleet patrol squadrons. VP-30 Detachment Alpha was established at NAS Norfolk, Virginia, to train personnel on the P5M Marlin seaplane, while the NAS Jacksonville unit provided training in the land-based P2V Neptune. The squadron had an initial complement of 40 officers, 271 enlisted personnel, five P5M-2 seaplanes and thirteen P2V aircraft, the latter being seven P2V-5Fs and six P2V-7s.

On 15 July 1961, the Detachment Alpha was merged with the parent organization at NAS Jacksonville when plans were made to begin retiring the P5M Marlin from the Navy's active inventory. On 1 June 1962, Detachment Alpha was reestablished at NAS Patuxent River, Maryland, to begin replacement training in the new P3V-1 Orion aircraft. On 15 September 1962, the Department of Defense Tri-Service Designation System was established, resulting in the redesignation of the P2V-5 as the P-2E and SP-2E, the P2V-7 as the P-2H and SP-2H, the P5M as the P-5B and SP-5B, and the P3V-1 as the P-3A

Detachment Alpha expanded until the end of the year, by which time it was staffed with 10 officers and 53 enlisted personnel.

On 21 October 1962, VP-30 transitioned from replacement training to an operational status for participation in the naval quarantine of Cuba during the Cuban Missile Crisis, providing ASW cover for Task Force 44. The squadron reverted to its primary training mission in March 1963.

In 1964, the squadron introduced the P-3B variant of the aircraft and began conducting training on this version of the aircraft as well. On 10 January 1966, the NAS Patuxent River detachment became the parent command, with the squadron headquarters relocating from NAS Jacksonville to NAS Patuxent River. Detachment Alpha was relocated to NAS Jacksonville for replacement training in the SP-2E Neptune aircraft.

From 27 May to 4 June 1968, VP-30 was called upon to assist in the search for the missing nuclear-powered attack submarine USS Scorpion, overdue since 22 May 1968. The squadron searched the last known location of the vessel, 700 miles (1,100 km) east of Norfolk, until 4 June 1968, without result.

On 10 December 1968, VP-30's Detachment Alpha at NAS Jacksonville was phased out with the retirement of the SP-2E airframe from the U.S. Navy's inventory while the later SP-2H variant remained in the active duty Navy until 1970 and the Naval Reserve until 1978. The assets and personnel of the detachment were merged with VP-31’s Detachment A, home based at NAS North Island, San Diego, California and personnel staffing of the former VP-30 Detachment A was reduced from 400 to 300 with the merger. The expanded VP-31 Det A continued training on the P-3 Orion airframe.

In June 1969, VP-30 received the first computerized models of the P-3C, later known as "Baseline" or "Non-Update" (NUD) models. In 1970, with the advent of the Fleet Readiness Aviation Maintenance Training Program (FRAMP), VP-30 also began training enlisted maintenance personnel as well as officer and enlisted flight crew personnel, conducting ten classes a year.

On 22 March 1972 Lieutenant, junior grade Judith Neuffer, the second female Naval Aviator, reported aboard VP-30. She became the first female aviator to receive training in the P-3. Upon graduation, she reported to Airborne Early Warning Squadron FOUR (VW-4), the "Navy Hurricane Hunters" at NAS Jacksonville, flying the WP-3A. On 21 June 1972, VP-30 became the first squadron operating the P-3 to reach the safety milestone of 100,000 consecutive accident-free flight hours. On 6 September 1972, AXAN Colleen A. Ocha became the first woman to undergo maintenance training at VP-30 FRAMP.

On 30 July 1975, VP-30 was relocated from NAS Patuxent River to its former home base at NAS Jacksonville. The Navy was prompted to initiate this move in the mid-1970s due to the increasing suburban construction around the NAS Patuxent River airfield, congestion with U.S. Naval Test Pilot School and Fleet Air Reconnaissance Squadron FOUR (VQ-4) aircraft operations, electronic interference from Naval Air Test Center operations, and the danger of an aircraft crash in a residential area.

By 1982, VP-30 had divested itself of all P-3B tactical training and most P-3A and P-3B pilot training to concentrate on P-3C training, with P-3B training continuing at VP-31 at NAS Moffett Field until the P-3B's retirement from the active duty Navy and total transfer to the Naval Air Reserve. With all P-3A and an increasing number of P-3B aircraft now in the Naval Air Reserve by this point, training in those airframes also shifted to Naval Reserve ASW Training Center at NAS Willow Grove, Pennsylvania. By 1983, VP-30 had grown to a staff of 700 personnel of all ranks, with 24 aircraft for the training of aircrew and maintenance people for service with Atlantic Fleet operational patrol squadrons in the P-3C, P-3C Update II and P-3C Update II.5 aircraft. In 1988, the squadron also commenced training on the P-3C Update III.

In October 1993, VP-30 became the sole Navy P-3 fleet readiness squadron upon the disestablishment of VP-31 following the BRAC-directed closure of NAS Moffett Field, California. In July 1995, VP-30 surpassed 31 years and 300,000 flight hours of accident-free flying, a Naval Aviation record. 21

In 1998, VP-30 formed the P-3 Weapons Tactics Unit (P-3 WTU) to provide fleet-wide training on topics including advanced tactics, weapon system employment, and in an effort to improve survivability during overland missions, established counter threat training. As a result, full operational integration of this platform was achieved during operations in Kosovo, Afghanistan, and Iraq, where Aircraft Improvement Program (AIP)-equipped P-3Cs fired AGM-88 Harpoon and AGM-88 SLAM-ER missiles, the first time the P-3 had fired missiles in combat since the Vietnam War. In 2002, VP-30 graduated the first Fleet Air Reconnaissance squadron (VQ) Naval Flight Officers after assuming the duties as EP-3E Sensor System Improvement Program model manager. In 2003, the squadron instituted the Fleet Instructor Training Course and the squadron's Naval Air Training and Operational Procedure Standardization (NATOPS) Department integrated the Naval Portable Flight Planning System into the P-3C and EP-3E fleet for training and evaluation.

With the consolidation of VP-30 and VP-31 into a single-site FRS in 1993, VP-30 is now the largest aviation squadron in the U.S. Navy and is considered an "aviation major command," with a commanding officer in the rank of Captain who has held previous command of an operational fleet P-3 or P-8 squadron.

There are currently twelve active duty VP fleet squadrons flying the P-8A, an active duty unmanned patrol fleet squadron (VUP) flying the MQ-4C at NAS Jacksonville under Commander, Patrol and Reconnaissance Wing ELEVEN (CPRW-11) and NAS Whidbey Island, Washington under Commander, Patrol and Reconnaissance Wing TEN (CPRW-10). There are also two Naval Air Force Reserve VP fleet squadrons flying the P-3C homeported at NAS Jacksonville and NAS Whidbey Island, respectively, who report to Commander, Maritime Support Wing at NAS North Island, California. Both of these squadrons are slated to commence transition to the P-8A in the first quarter of FY23. In addition, one active duty special project squadron (VPU) flying modified P-3C aircraft is homeported at MCAS Kaneohe Bay, Hawaii and one Fleet Air Reconnaissance squadron (VQ) flying the EP-3E Aries II is homeported at NAS Whidbey Island, both units under the control of CPRW-10.

An additional Navy Reserve VP-30 Squadron Augment Unit (VP-30 SAU), similar to U.S. Air Force's "Associate" wing, group, and squadron construct in the Air Force Reserve and the Air National Guard, was also established at VP-30 to aid in the responsibilities of supporting both Active Component and Reserve Component replacement training. This cadre of highly experienced Naval Aviators, Naval Flight Officers, and enlisted Naval Aircrewman, all with extensive prior active duty experience, serve on operational flying status as part-time Selected Reservists (SELRES), providing additional P-3C and P-8A instructor personnel to VP-30 for academic, flight simulator/weapon system trainer, and in-flight training events as part of the Navy's Active Reserve Integration (ARI) initiative.

All U.S. Navy personnel currently manning operational P-8, EP-3, and MQ-4 squadrons and units in both the Active Component and the Reserve Component have received prior training from VP-30.

== Awards ==
VP-30's unit awards include six Navy and Marine Corps Meritorious Unit Commendations, including three for the training and introduction of P-3s for the Royal Norwegian Air Force, for P-3C Update II training of the Japanese Maritime Self Defense Force and the Royal Netherlands Navy, and for the consolidation of all P-3 training into a single-site FRS. VP-30 also received the Coast Guard Meritorious Unit Commendation with Operational Distinguishing Device for participation in the 1985–1986 Winter Law Enforcement Operation; the 1971, 1983, 1991, 1992, 1995, 1998, 2007 and 2008 CNO Safety Award, and the 1995, 1999, 2000, and 2001 CINCLANTFLT Golden Anchor Award for retention. VP-30 was honored to receive the 2008 Golden Wrench Award for the most outstanding aircraft maintenance organization of any U.S. Navy patrol squadron, as well as the 2010 DEFY Fulcrum Shield award and 2010 Retention Excellence award.

In December 2010, VP-30 surpassed 46 years and over 450,000 flight hours without a Class A mishap. Additionally, the 2010 Naval Safety Center Aviation Maintenance Survey assessed VP-30 as having the best overall score of more than 300 units evaluated over the previous year. VP-30 has twice received the Commander T.G. Ellyson Award for aviator production excellence, which is presented to the Navy's most effective fleet replacement squadron.

== Aircraft assignments ==
The squadron was assigned the following aircraft, effective on the dates shown:

- P2V-5F/FS – June 1960
- P2V-7S – June 1960
- P5M-1/1S – June 1960
- P5M-2/2S – January 1961
- P-3A – November 1962
- SP-2E – December 1962
- SP-2H – December 1962
- SP-5B – December 1962
- P-3B – December 1965
- P-3C – June 1969
- P-3C UII – November 1977
- VP-3A – 1978
- P-3C UII.5 – June 1983
- TP-3A – 1986
- P-3C UIII – May 1987
- P-3C UIIIR – June 1989
- P-3C BMUP – 1996
- P-3C AIP – 1998
- P-8A – March 2012

== Home Port Assignments ==
The squadron was assigned to these home ports, effective on the dates shown:

- NAS Jacksonville, – Florida 30 June 1960
- NAS Norfolk, Virginia (Det A) – 30 June 1960
- NAS Patuxent River, Maryland (Det A) – 1 June 1962
- NAS Patuxent River – 10 January 1966
- NAS Jacksonville (Det A) – 10 January 1966
- NAS Jacksonville − 30 July 1975

== See also ==
- Maritime patrol aircraft
- List of United States Navy aircraft squadrons
- List of inactive United States Navy aircraft squadrons
- List of squadrons in the Dictionary of American Naval Aviation Squadrons
- History of the United States Navy
