= VP-91 =

Patrol Squadron 91
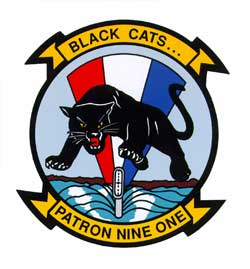
- VP-91 patch
- Active: 1 November 1970 - 31 March 1999
- Country: United States of America
- Branch: United States Navy Reserve
- Type: squadron
- Role: Maritime patrol
- Nicknames: Pink Panthers; Stingers; Black Cats
- Engagements: Gulf War

Aircraft flown
- Patrol: P-3A/B/C Orion

Patrol Squadron 91 (VP-91) was a patrol squadron of the U.S. Naval Reserve. It was the second squadron to bear the VP-91 designation; the first VP-91 was redesignated VPB-91 on 1 October 1944. The squadron was established on 1 November 1970 and deactivated 29 years later, on 31 March 1999. It flew the Lockheed P-3 Orion, and was based at NAS Moffett Field during its entire life. The squadron's nicknames were the Pink Panthers from 1970 to 1984, the Stingers from 1984 to 1991, and the Black Cats from 1991 to 1999. Units of the squadron made 25 major overseas deployments.

== Operational history ==
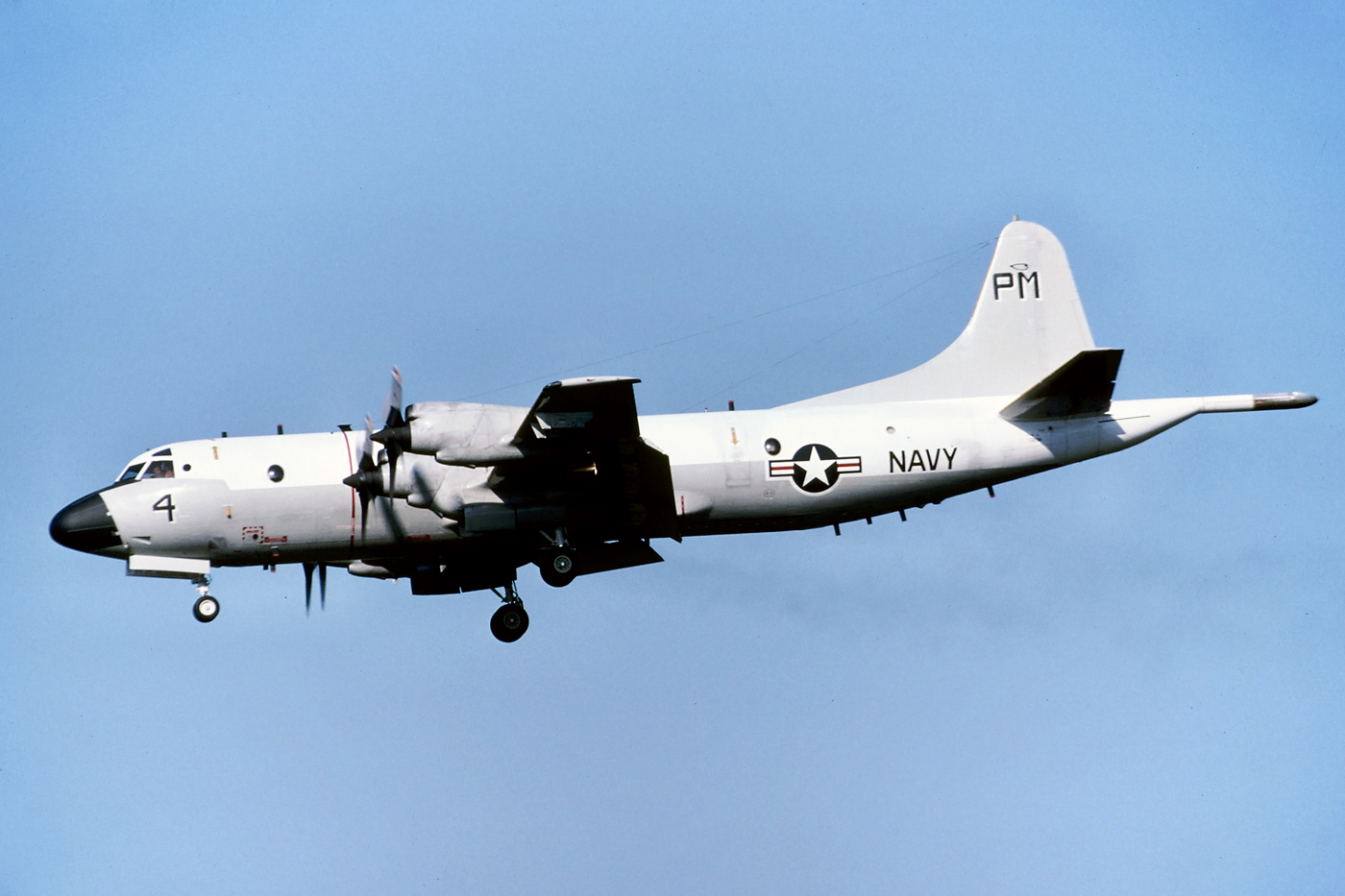
VP-91 P-3C in October 1994

- 1 Nov 1970: VP-91 was established at NAS Moffett Field, and was the first Naval Air Reserve land-based patrol squadron on the West Coast to fly the P-3A Orion aircraft. The new squadron came under the operational and administrative control of the Commander, Naval Air Reserve Force, and the Commander, Fleet Air Reserve Wings, Pacific. VP-91 was established as a result of a major reorganization of Naval Air Reserve that took place in mid-1970. Under the Reserve Force Squadron concept, 12 land-based naval reserve patrol squadrons were formed and structured along the lines of regular Navy squadrons with nearly identical organization and manning levels. The 12/2/1 concept had 12 VP squadrons under two commands, COMFAIRESWINGLANT and COMFAIRESWINGPAC. These two commands came under the control of one central authority, Commander Naval Air Reserve. VP-91 had its origins in an earlier unit located at NAS Moffett Field, called NARTU Alameda Detachment Alpha. Det Alpha was established on 1 March 1967 to provide for the transition of selected air reserve P-2 Neptune units into the first reserve P-3 units.
- June–July 1980: VP-91 participated in the location of Vietnamese boat people during the unit's annual active duty while on deployment at NAS Agana, Guam. Squadron crews located five refugee vessels resulting in the saving of 250 lives. The five crews participating in the rescue were awarded the Humanitarian Service Medal. By this date, over 2,500 refugees had been rescued in the South China Sea and Gulf of Thailand through efforts by all elements of the Navy.
- February 1991: One crew and aircraft were deployed to participate in Operation Desert Storm. The crew was credited with assisting in the destruction of two Iraqi Navy vessels during combat in the Persian Gulf. This event marked the only participation by a Navy Reserve patrol squadron in direct combat with the Iraqi Navy during the Gulf War.
- 1 July 1994: NAS Moffett Field was disestablished after 62 years of service as a naval air station and Army Air Corps field. The base continued to serve the National Aeronautical and Space Administration, the Naval Air Reserve, and the California Air National Guard but was no longer under the Navy's operational or administrative control. The active duty P-3 squadrons were relocated to NAS Barbers Point, Hawaii, and NAS Whidbey Island, Washington. VP-91 continued to operate from the base, now known as Moffett Federal Airfield, California.
- 31 March 1999: The squadron was deactivated at Moffett Federal Airfield.

== Aircraft assignment ==
The squadron first received the following aircraft on the dates shown:

- P-3A Orion – November 1970
- P-3B MOD Orion – 1978
- P-3C UIII Orion – February 1990

== See also ==
- Maritime patrol aircraft
- List of Lockheed P-3 Orion variants
- List of inactive United States Navy aircraft squadrons
- List of United States Navy aircraft squadrons
- List of squadrons in the Dictionary of American Naval Aviation Squadrons
- History of the United States Navy
