= Moffett Federal Airfield =

Joint civil-military airport in California

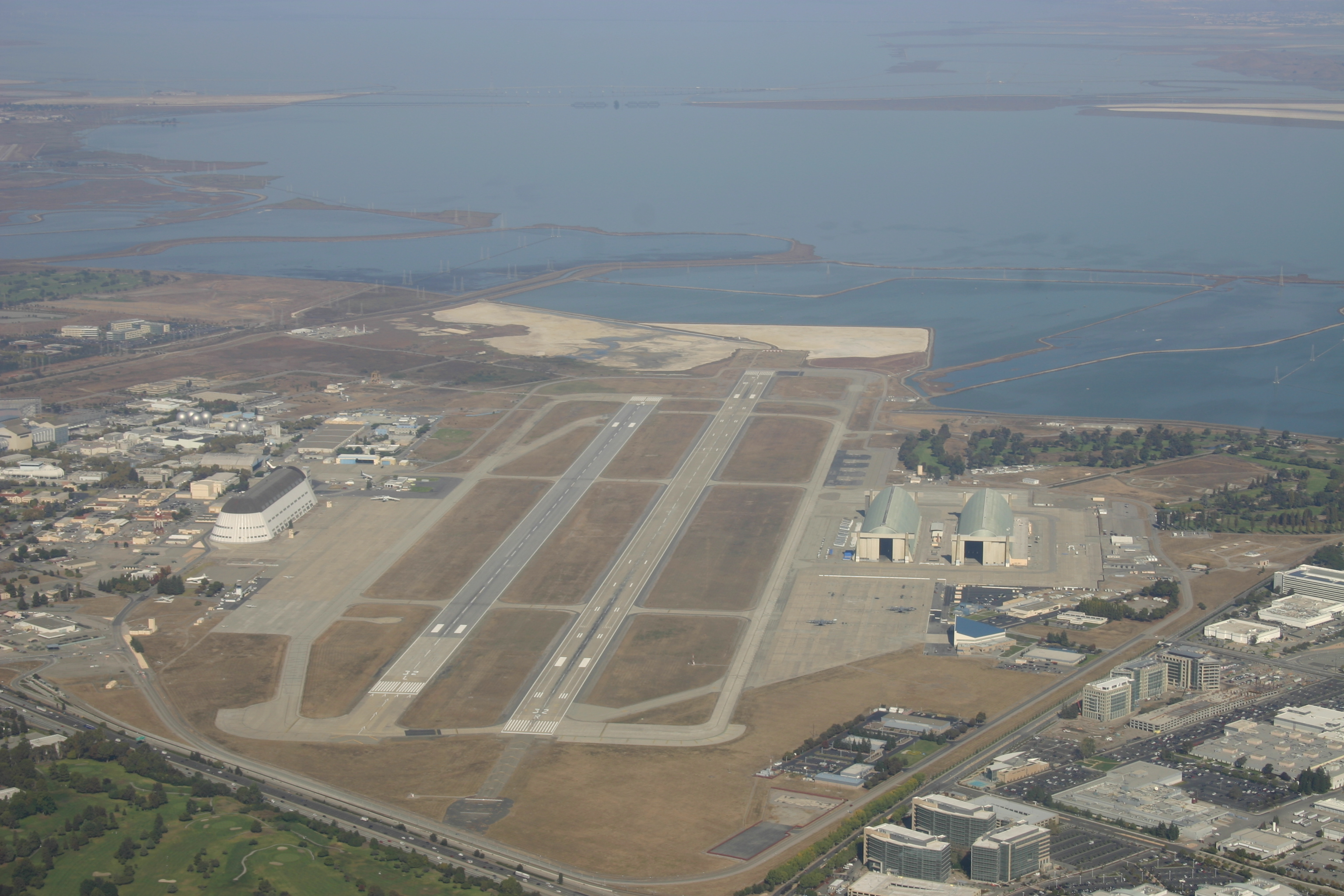
- IATA: NUQ; ICAO: KNUQ; FAA LID: NUQ; WMO: 74509

Summary
- Airport type: Public/military
- Operator: Google
- Location: Santa Clara County, near Mountain View and Sunnyvale, California, US
- Elevation AMSL: 37 ft (11 m)
- Coordinates: 37°24′54″N 122°02′54″W
- Interactive map of Moffett Federal Airfield

Runways
Direction	Length		Surface
Direction	ft	m	Surface
14L/32R	9,197	2,803	Concrete
14R/32L	8,122	2,476	Asphalt
- Source: Federal Aviation Administration

Moffett Federal Airfield (IATA: NUQ, ICAO: KNUQ, FAA LID: NUQ), also known as Moffett Field, is a joint civil-military airport located in an unincorporated part of Santa Clara County, California, United States, between northern Mountain View and northern Sunnyvale. On November 10, 2014, NASA announced that it would be leasing 1,000 acres (400 ha) of the airfield property to Google for 60 years.

The airport is near the south end of San Francisco Bay, northwest of San Jose. Formerly a US Navy facility, the former naval air station is now owned and operated by the NASA Ames Research Center. Tenant military activities include the 129th Rescue Wing of the California Air National Guard, operating the HC-130J Combat King II and HH-60G Pave Hawk aircraft, as well as the adjacent Headquarters for the 7th Psychological Operations Group of the US Army Reserve. Until July 28, 2010, the US Air Force's 21st Space Operations Squadron was also a tenant command at Moffett Field, occupying the former Onizuka Air Force Station. In addition to these military activities, NASA also operates several of its own aircraft from Moffett.

Hangars One, Two, and Three, and the adjacent Shenandoah Plaza are collectively designated as a National Historic District listed on the National Register of Historic Places.

Hangar One is one of the world's largest freestanding structures, covering 8 acres (32,000 m^{2}). The hangar was constructed in 1931. Hangar One is a Naval Historical Monument, Historic American Engineering Record CA-335, State of California Historic Civil Engineering Landmarks. In May 2008, the National Trust for Historic Preservation listed Hangar One on their list of America's Most Endangered Places.

Hangar Two is one of the world's largest freestanding wood structures, as was Hangar Three before it was demolished in 2024. The hangars were constructed when the US Navy established ten lighter-than-air bases across the United States during World War II as part of the coastal defense plan. Five of the original seventeen of these wooden hangars still exist: one at Moffett Field, one at Tustin, California, one at Tillamook, Oregon, and two at Lakehurst, New Jersey.

The adjacent NASA Ames Research Center is also home to several wind tunnels, including the Unitary Plan Wind Tunnel (a National Historic Landmark), and the National Full-Scale Aerodynamic Complex.

Occasionally, various jets from the United States Marine Corps will temporarily stay at the airfield before heading out to the numerous military operations areas nearby along the California coast.

== History ==
=== Sunnyvale operations ===
In 1930, the city of Sunnyvale acquired a 1,000-acre (4.0 km^{2}) parcel of farmland bordering San Francisco Bay, paid for with nearly US$480,000 (equivalent to $9,250,996 in 2025) raised by the citizens of Santa Clara County, then "sold" the parcel for $1 to the US government as a home base for the Navy airship USS Macon. The location proved to be ideal for an airport, since the area is often clear while other parts of the San Francisco Bay are covered in fog. This is due to the Coast Range to the west, which blocks the cold oceanic air that is the cause of San Francisco fog.

=== Naval operations ===
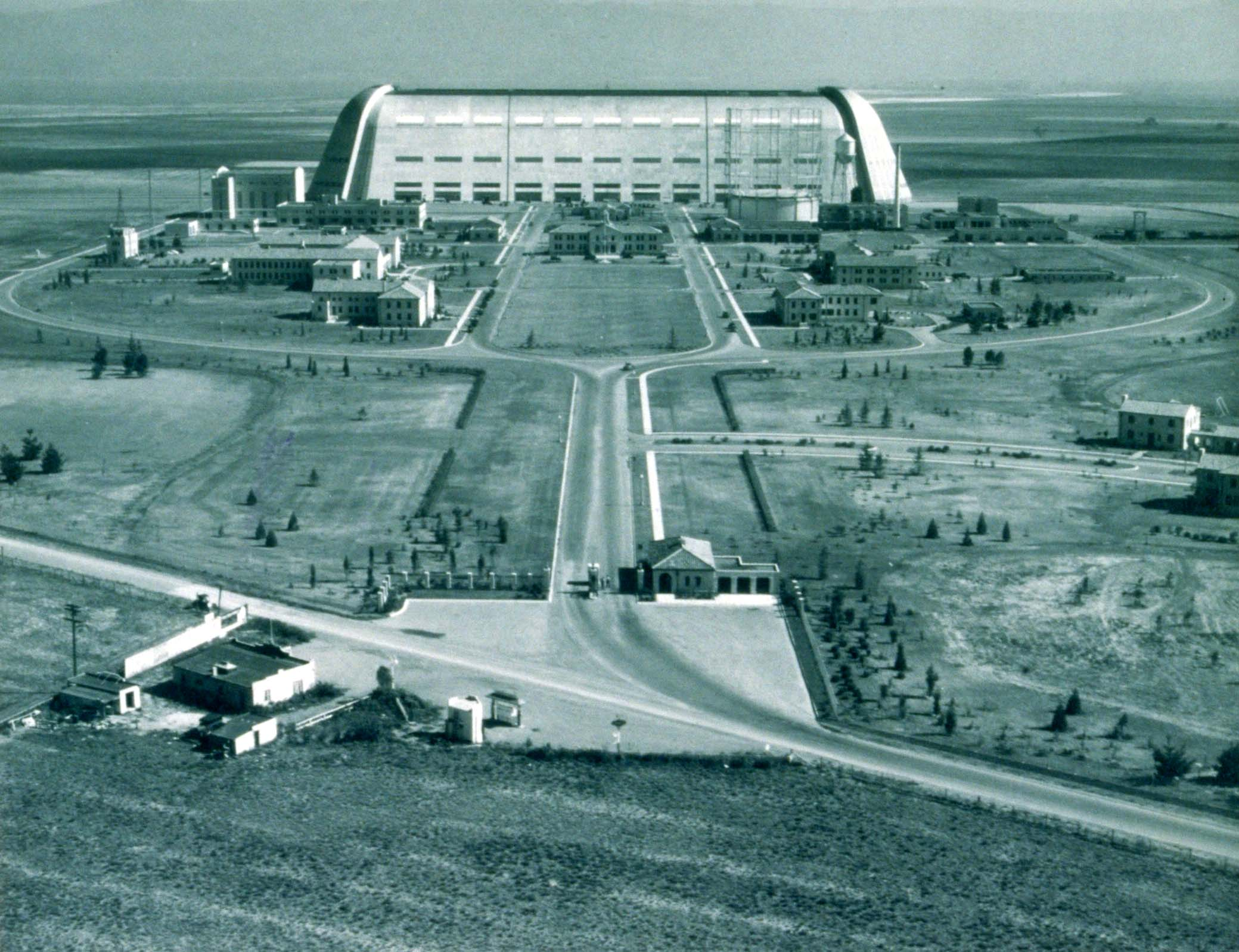
Established in 1931, Moffett Field in Sunnyvale/Mountain View has played a strategic role in Silicon Valley's evolution, researching and developing key technologies, first for the U.S. military and then for NASA. Today it hosts the Ames Research Center.

The naval air station (NAS) was authorized by an Act of Congress, signed by President Herbert Hoover on 12 February 1931. Construction of the original facilities was begun 8 July 1931. The base was originally named Airbase Sunnyvale CAL as it was thought that calling it Mountain View would cause officials to fear airships colliding with mountainsides. The original station was commissioned on 12 April 1933 and dedicated NAS Sunnyvale. After the death of Rear Admiral William A. Moffett, who is credited with the creation of the airfield, in the loss of the USS Akron on 4 April 1933, the airfield at NAS Sunnyvale was renamed Moffett Field on 1 September 1933. In the tradition of the Navy, the installation is named for the surrounding city, while the airfield on the installation, including runways, can be named after an individual. Examples include Forrest Sherman Airfield at NAS Pensacola and Halsey Airfield at NAS North Island.

After the Macon crashed in the Pacific Ocean on 12 February 1935, the Navy considered closing NAS Sunnyvale and Moffett Field at due to its high cost of operations. Also, in San Diego, the Army and Navy were having jurisdictional issues over Naval Air Station North Island in San Diego harbor, which had both NAS San Diego as well as the Army's Rockwell Field dividing the island. The Navy wanted the Army out of North Island as it needed to expand NAS San Diego as a training airfield for its growing number of aircraft carrier pilots. The Army resisted strongly, as Rockwell Field was a major training airfield for flight cadets, and had been using the field for flight training since 1912. With the subtle assistance of President Franklin Roosevelt, a former assistant secretary of the Navy, a complex arrangement of facilities realignment was made by the War Department which transferred NAS Sunnyvale and Moffett Field to Army jurisdiction and Rockwell Field to the Navy in October 1935, becoming NAS North Island.

Upon taking jurisdiction of NAS Sunnyvale and Moffett Field, the base was renamed Army Air Corps Training Base Sunnyvale. The Army also took on the high cost of Hangar One's maintenance and wanted to inactivate the facility. However, President Roosevelt would not allow the closure of the facility, and the Army assigned Moffett to its Western Flying Training Command as headquarters for pilot and aircrew flight training west of the Rocky Mountains. Also in 1939, the former NAS Sunnyvale saw the establishment of the Ames Aeronautical Laboratory.

As an aftermath of the Japanese attack on Pearl Harbor, the Navy wanted to use Moffett Field and the large dirigible hangar for blimp operations along with Pacific Coast. However, the Army, still stinging about having to transfer Rockwell Field to the Navy, resisted strongly. Again the inter-service rivalry was overruled by the War Department, citing the Navy's need for coastal defense a priority and ordered the Army to move its training headquarters to Hamilton Field in Marin County, north of San Francisco.

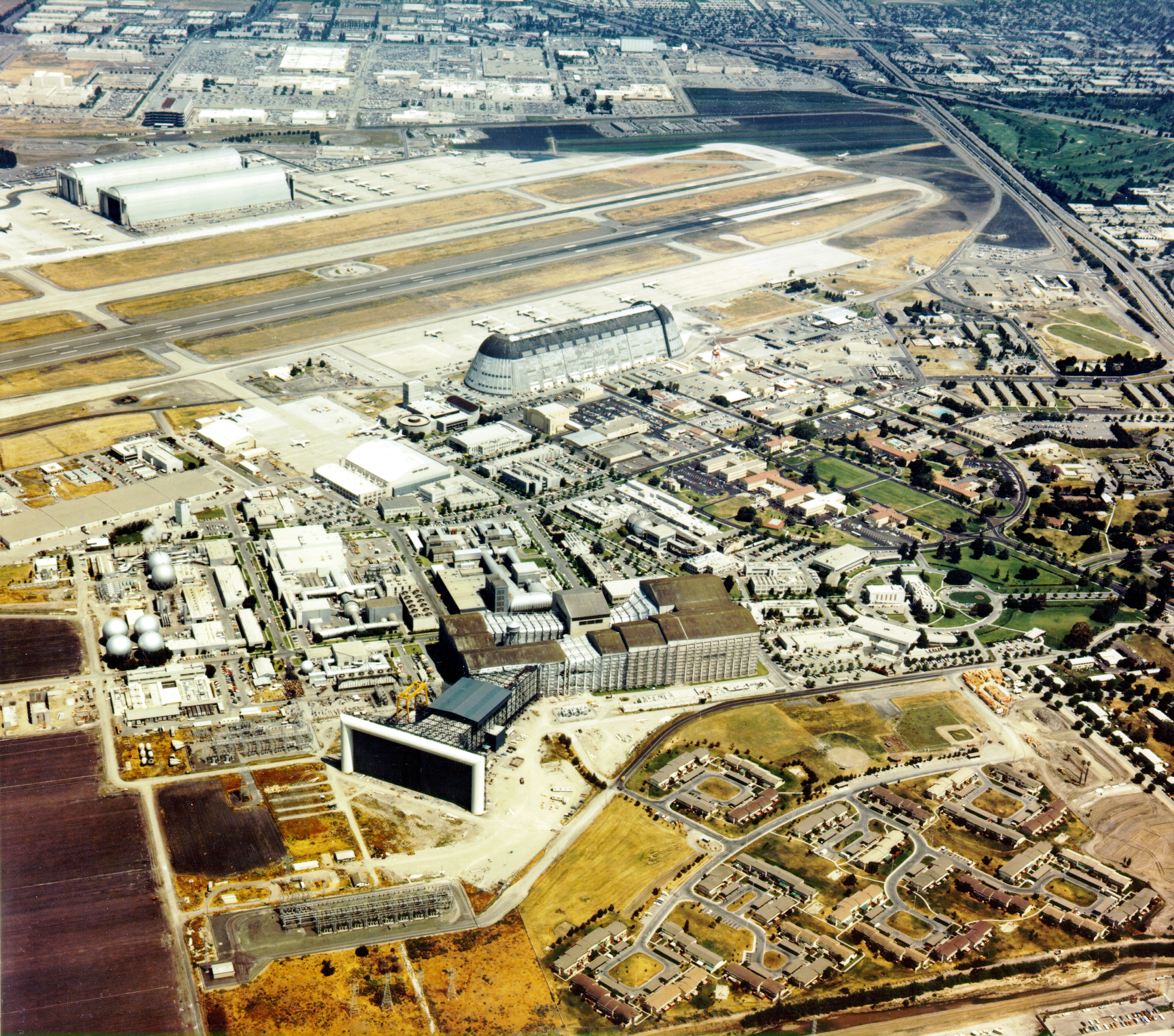
Aerial view of NAS Moffett Field and NASA Ames Research Center in 1982

On April 16, 1942, control of the facility was returned to the Navy and it was recommissioned as NAS Sunnyvale. Four days later it was again renamed Naval Air Station Moffett Field, thereby becoming one of the few Naval Air Stations named after an individual. The Navy then built Hangars 2 and 3 on the eastern side of the runways for additional blimp operations. Due to the priority of metal for use in building war materials such as airplanes, ships and tanks, these two hangars were built from wood and concrete. From the end of World War II until its closure, NAS Moffett Field saw the development and use of several generations of land-based anti-submarine warfare and maritime patrol aircraft, including the Lockheed P2V Neptune and Lockheed P-3 Orion. Until the demise of the USSR and for some time thereafter, daily anti-submarine, maritime reconnaissance, Fleet support, and various training sorties flew out from NAS Moffett Field to patrol along the Pacific coastline, while Moffett's other squadrons and aircraft periodically deployed to other Pacific, Indian Ocean and Persian Gulf bases for periods of up to six months.

The onset of the Korean War brought a restructuring of the Navy's disposition of air forces, resulting in several squadrons being transferred to the Moffett Field as well as Naval Air Station Alameda. During the 1950s the Moffett served as the fighter base, with Alameda hosting attack aircraft. Naval aircraft home based in Moffett included the F9F Panther and FJ-3 Fury. On Feb. 1, 1957, a Navy Thunderjet plane piloted by Capt. Robert Mulvehill, 32, of Edenburg, PA, crashed at 3:25 p.m. in Mountain View while on approach to Moffett Field. The plane was travelling parallel to Castro Street when it crashed near the corner of California and Oak Streets, narrowly missing an elementary school, according to the Mountain View Register-Leader—the local paper of record at the time.

By the end of the 1950s the Navy was looking to consolidate assets as the majority of carrier based aircraft had transitioned to larger jet powered aircraft, needing longer runways. The majority of squadrons based at Moffett transferred to Naval Air Station Miramar when they transitioned to the F-8 Crusader; while attack aircraft from Alameda were relocated to the newly opened Naval Air Station Lemoore. By 1961, the last fighter aircraft had left Moffett Field.

In 1960, the nearby Air Force Satellite Test Center (STC), was created adjacent to (on the SE corner of) NAS Moffett Field. Often referred to as "the Blue Cube," it was operational until 2010 as Onizuka Air Force Station, part of the Air Force Satellite Control Network (AFSCN). The building was demolished in 2014.

In August 1986 during the NAS Moffett Field Airshow, the Italian demonstration team, Frecce Tricolori, and the German Navy's F-104 flight demonstration team, the Vikings, performed in front of the crowd.

At its peak in the 1990s, NAS Moffett Field was the U.S. Navy's principal Pacific Fleet base for the P-3C operations. In addition to headquarters staffs for Commander, U.S. Patrol Wings Pacific Fleet (COMPATWINGSPAC); Commander, Patrol Wing 10 (COMPATWING 10); and Commander, Reserve Patrol Wing Pacific / Patrol Wing 4 (COMRESPATWINGPAC/COMPATWING 4), the air station also hosted Patrol Squadron THIRTY-ONE (VP-31)...the west coast P-3C Fleet Replacement Squadron, six additional active duty P-3C squadrons and a Naval Air Reserve P-3C squadron in addition to NASA and California Air National Guard aviation activities.

=== Ames Research Center operations ===
Post-Cold War defense cutbacks and related Base Realignment and Closure (BRAC) actions in the 1990s identified NAS Moffett Field for closure. The west coast Fleet Replacement Squadron, Patrol Squadron 31 (VP-31), was deactivated and its functions combined with its east coast counterpart, Patrol Squadron 30 (VP-30) at NAS Jacksonville, Florida. Several active duty P-3C squadrons, the Naval Air Reserve P-3C squadron (VP-91) and COMRESPATWINGPAC/COMPATWING 4 were also deactivated, while COMPATWINGSPAC and COMPATWING 10 (redesignated COMPATRECONWING 10) transferred to NAS Whidbey Island, Washington and the remaining patrol squadrons transferred to NAS Whidbey Island, Washington or NAS Barbers Point, Hawaii until the latter's BRAC-directed closure in 1999, at which time the Barbers Point squadrons moved to Marine Corps Air Station Kaneohe Bay, Hawaii until they converted to the P-8 Poseidon, at which time they also relocated to NAS Whidbey Island, using Kaneohe Bay only as a deployment site.

On 1 July 1994, NAS Moffett Field was closed as a naval air station and turned over to the NASA Ames Research Center. NASA Ames now operates the facility as Moffett Federal Airfield. Since being decommissioned as a primary military installation, part of Moffett has been made accessible to the public, including a cordoned portion of the interior of the massive Hangar One. There were once balloon rides given on show days, and micro-weather still occurs in the cavernous space.

Moffett Federal Airfield has occasional air traffic, with an average of 5-10 flights landing per day. Moffett is regularly used by the California Air National Guard as the home base for its 129th Rescue Wing (129 RQW), as well as by NASA, Lockheed Martin Space Systems (commercial satellite manufacturer), the Google founders for their private planes, the Santa Clara County Sheriff's Department for their helicopter STAR 1, and Air Force One during presidential visits to the Bay Area.

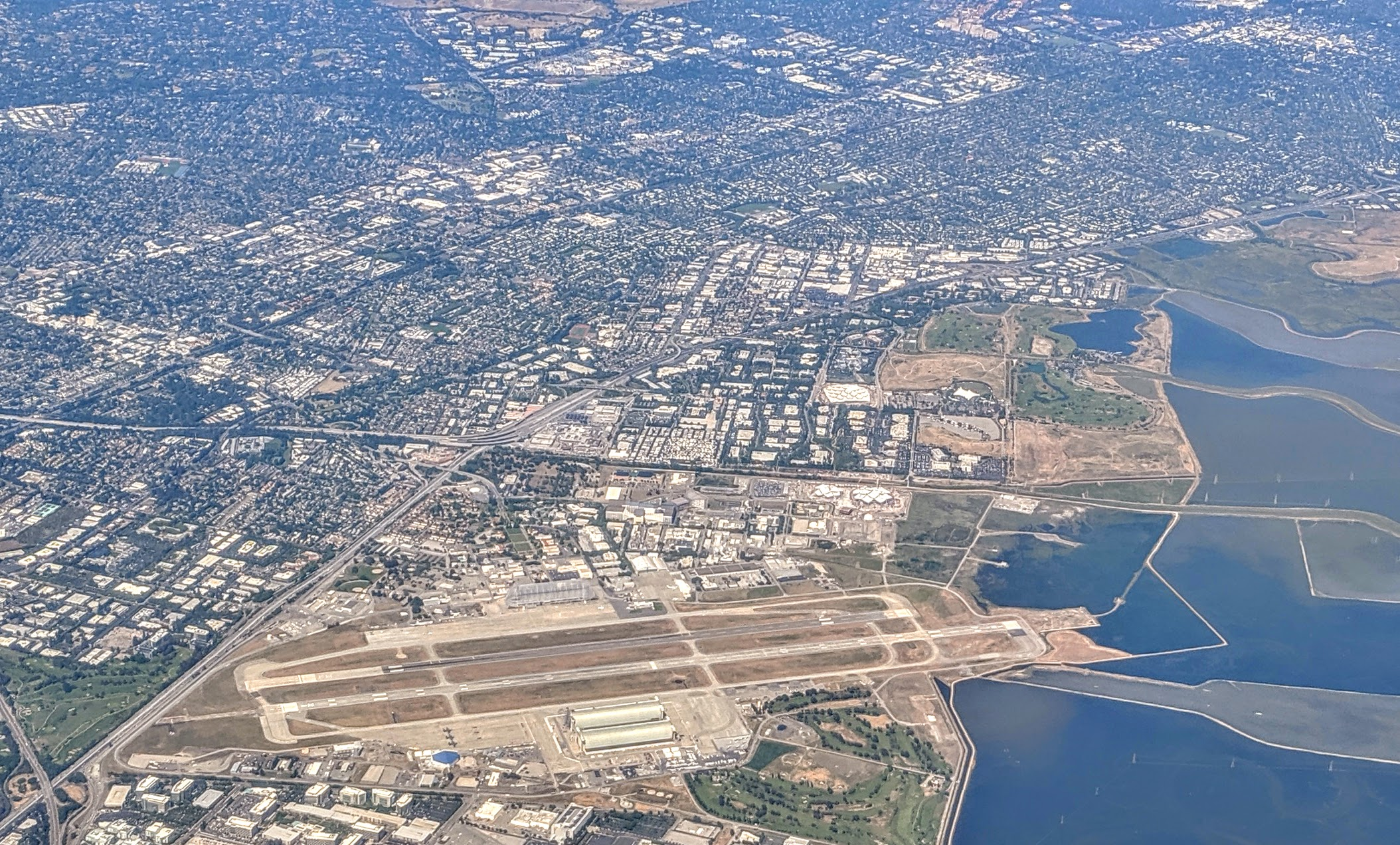
Aerial view of Moffett Field from the east, with under-construction (in 2019) Google buildings visible on both sides of Stevens Creek beyond the field

In 2008, the Ames Research Center leased 42 acres around the field to Google. In 2013 Google began building a 1.1 million square foot office complex consisting of nine buildings overlooking San Francisco Bay dubbed "Bay View." The buildings are to be the new headquarters for Google and will be part of the nearby Googleplex.

== Hangar One ==
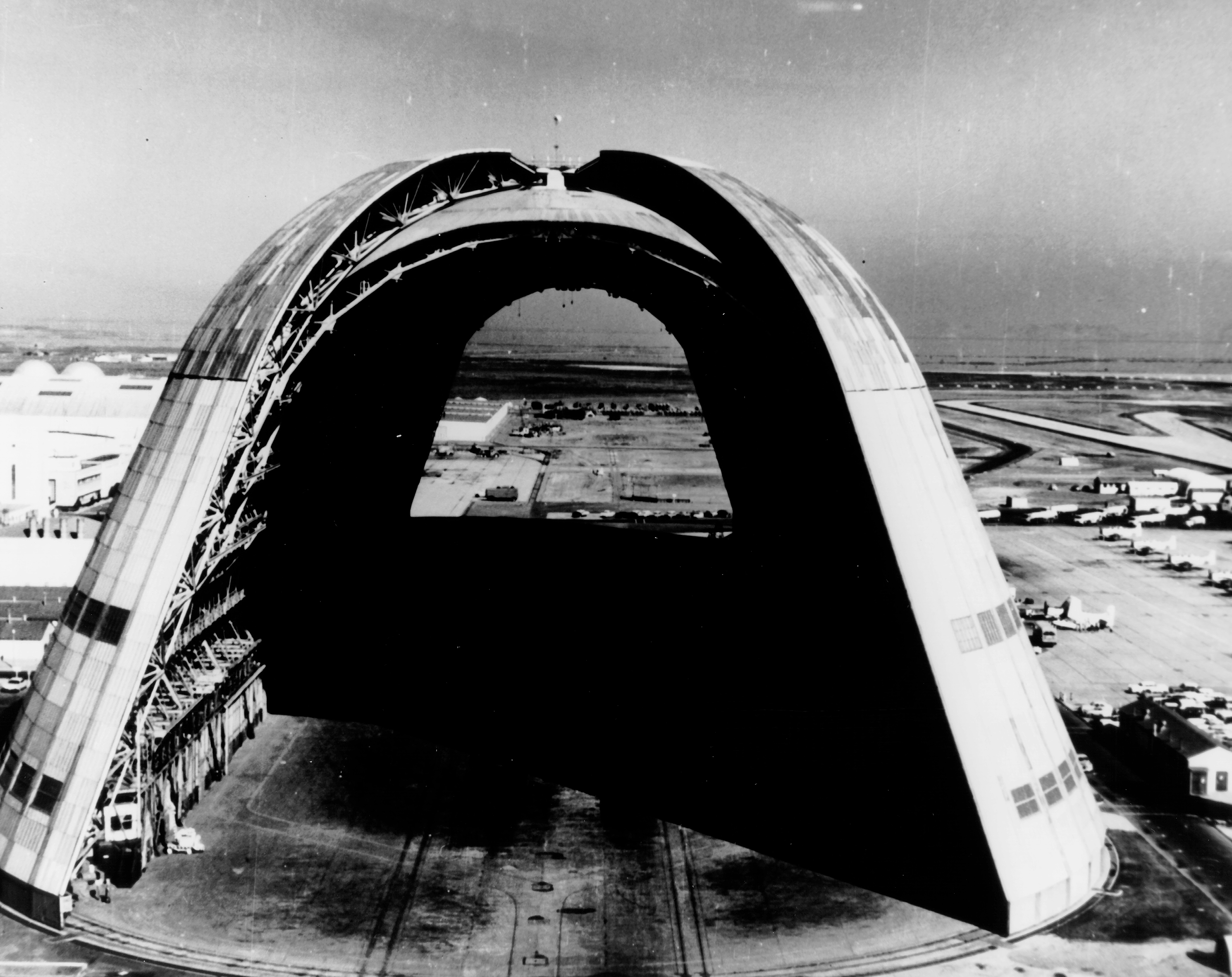
View of Hangar One, the huge dirigible hangar, with doors open at both ends

Moffett Field's "Hangar One" (built during the Depression era for the USS Macon) and the row of World War II blimp hangars are still some of the largest unsupported structures in the country. The airship hangar is constructed on a network of steel girders sheathed with galvanized steel. It rests firmly upon a reinforced pad anchored to concrete pilings. The floor covers eight acres (32,000 m^{2}) and can accommodate six (360 feet x 160 feet) football fields. The airship hangar itself, measures 1,133 feet (345 m) long and 308 feet (94 m) wide. The building has aerodynamic architecture. Its walls curve upward and inward, to form an elongated dome 198 feet (60 m) high. The clam-shell doors were designed to reduce turbulence when the Macon moved in and out on windy days. The "orange peel" doors, weighing 500 tons (511.88 tonnes) each, are moved by their own 150 horsepower motors operated via an electrical control panel.

The airship hangar's interior is so large that fog sometimes forms near the ceiling. A person unaccustomed to its vastness is susceptible to optical disorientation. Looking across its deck, planes and tractors look like toys. Along its length maintenance shops, inspection laboratories and offices help keep the hangar busy. Looking up, a network of catwalks for access to all parts of the structure can be seen. Two elevators meet near the top, allowing maintenance personnel to get to the top quickly and easily.

Narrow gauge tracks run through the length of the hangar. During the period of lighter-than-air dirigibles and non-rigid aircraft, the rails extended across the apron and into the fields at each end of the hangar. This tramway facilitated the transportation of an airship on the mooring mast to the airship hangar interior or to the flight position. During the brief period that the Macon was based at Moffett, Hangar One accommodated not only the giant airship but several smaller, non-rigid blimps simultaneously.

In 2003, plans to convert Hangar One to a space and science center were put on hold with the discovery that the structure was leaking toxic chemicals into the sediment in wetlands bordering San Francisco Bay. The chemicals originated in the lead paint and toxic materials, including polychlorinated biphenyls (PCBs), used to coat the hangar. Options under debate included tearing down the hangar and reusing the land, and cleaning the toxic waste from the site and refurbishing the hangar for future preservation.

The US Navy evaluated options for remediating the PCBs, lead and asbestos, and NASA evaluated options for reuse of the hangar. Some historic and nonprofit groups wanted the hangar preserved as a historic landmark, as the hangar is a major Bay Area landmark and historic site.

In 2006, an offer to clean the hangar and coat its outsides with solar panels to recoup the costs of cleaning was floated by a private company, but the plan never saw fruition because it was too costly.

In August 2008, the Navy proposed simply stripping the toxic coating from the hangar and leaving the skeleton after spraying it with a preservative. The Navy claimed that to reclad the structure would cost another $15 million and that this was NASA's responsibility. This was regarded as a partial victory by campaigners.

In September 2008, NASA indicated that it was still urging the Navy to restore the hangar, but that it was willing to help save the structure; in particular, NASA was in favor of re-covering the structure at the same time that it was stripped.

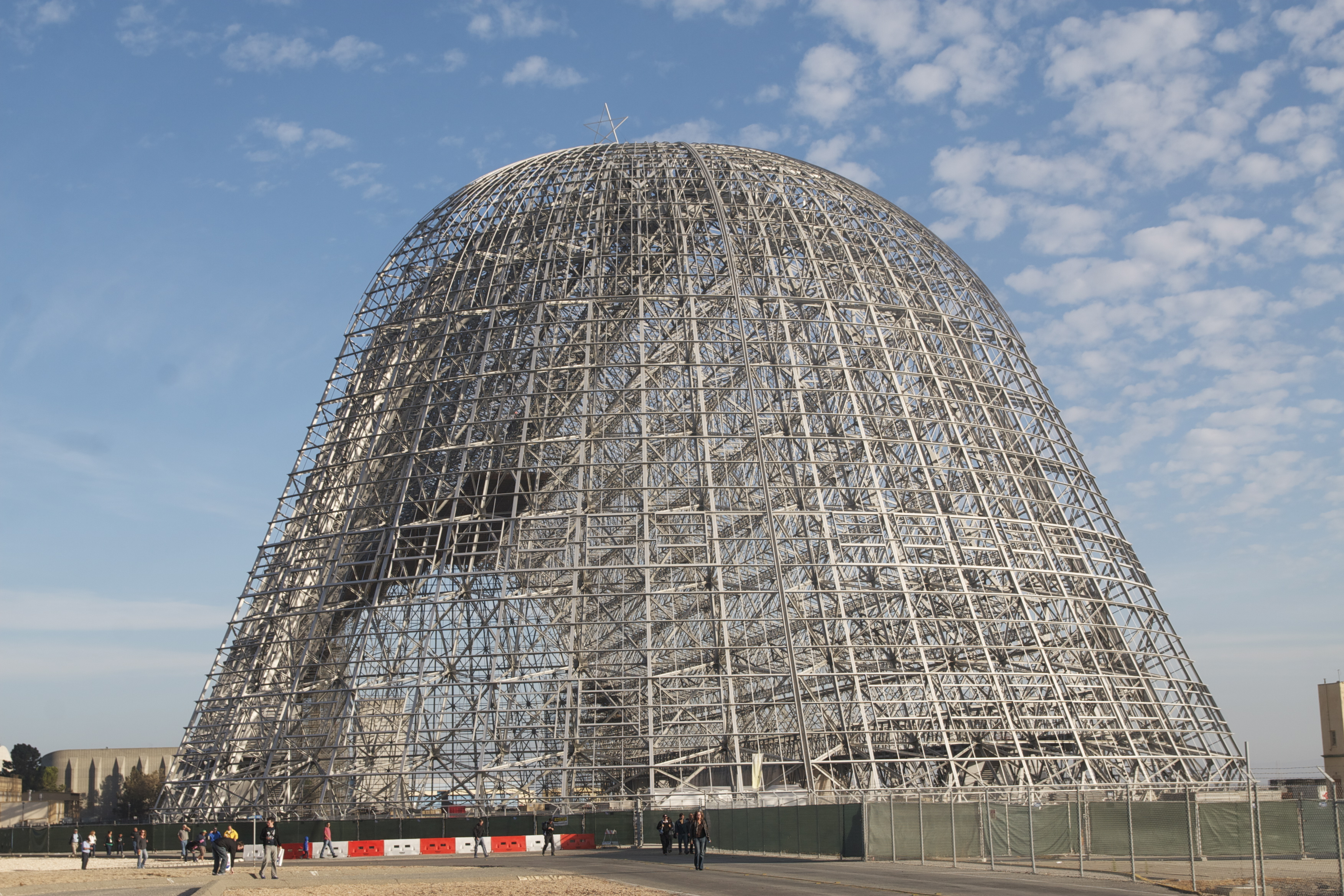
View of the hangar's skeleton during restoration in September 2012

In April 2011, the exterior panels began coming down, starting at the top.

=== Restoration ===
On April 21, 2011, crews began stripping the PCB-laced exterior panels of Hangar One.

In November 2014, Planetary Ventures LLC, a Google subsidiary, signed a $1.16 billion, 60-year lease. This would "save NASA approximately $6.3 million annually in maintenance and operation costs". Google planned to invest an additional $200 million to renovate and restore the structure.

== Hangars 2 & 3 ==
Moffett Field's Hangars Two and Three were built at the beginning of World War II for a program of coastal defense. Hangar Two is still one of the largest unsupported wooden structures in the country.

In 1940, the US Navy proposed to the US Congress the development of a lighter-than-air station program for anti-submarine patrolling of the coast and harbors. This program proposed the construction of new stations in addition to the expansion at NAS Lakehurst. The original contract was for steel hangars, 960 feet (290 m) long, 328 feet (100 m) wide and 190 feet (58 m), helium storage and service, barracks for 228 men, a power plant, landing mat, and a mobile mooring mast. The Second Deficiency Appropriation Bill for 1941, passed July 3, 1941, changed the authorization to the construction of 8 facilities to accommodate a total of 48 airships (as requested in 1940), but due to steel rations, a total of 17 large wooden hangars were built among 10 LTA bases.

As finally developed in 1943, LTA facilities in addition to NAS Lakehurst (2) and NAS Moffett Field (2), included NAS South Weymouth (1), NAS Weeksville (1), NAS Glynco (2), NAS Richmond (3), NAS Houma (1), NAS Hitchcock (1), NAS Santa Ana (2) and NAS Tillamook (2). In the initial program, accommodations were provided for six airships at each station. This was later increased to twelve at seven of the stations and to eighteen at NAS Richmond as a result of an increase in the authorized strength to 200 airships.

An episode of the Discovery Channel TV show MythBusters used one of the hangars to disprove the myth that it is not possible to fold a sheet of paper in half more than seven times. The sheet of paper covered nearly the full width of the airship hangar. Other Mythbusters episodes have utilized the hangar to test myths such as "Inflating a football with helium allows longer kick distances" and "Airworthy aircraft can be constructed of concrete."

Hangar 3 was demolished in stages beginning in Summer 2024, after NASA and Google concluded it would be "cost-prohibitive" to repair.

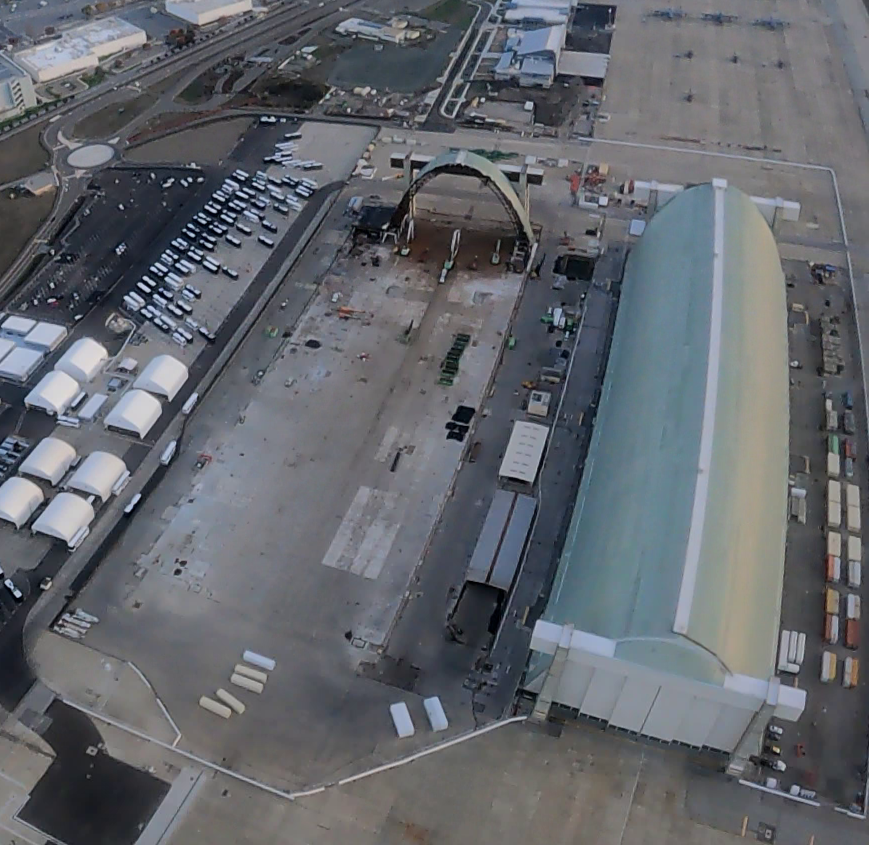
Aerial photo of Moffett Federal Airfield Hangar 3 in the final stages of being demolished and Hangar 2.

Five of the original 17 of the wooden hangars still exist: Moffett Field (1), Tustin, California (1), Tillamook, Oregon (1), and Lakehurst, New Jersey (2).

== Facilities ==
Despite its closure as an active military base, Moffett Field still has many active facilities and residents. Active military families still live on Moffett Community Housing, and the former base has several lodges which primarily house academics and students associated with the Ames Research Center. Moffett Field's facilities available to residents include a Commissary, post office, golf course, and tennis courts.

=== Status of former military buildings ===
Many of the buildings at Moffett Field which once supported its active military presence have been abandoned and left standing due to asbestos contamination within the structures.

=== Airfield ===
Moffett Field is an active airfield, and has two active runways:

- Runway 14L/32R: 9,197 ft × 200 ft (2,803 m × 61 m), surface: concrete
- Runway 14R/32L: 8,122 ft × 200 ft (2,476 m × 61 m), surface: asphalt

=== University facilities ===
Moffett Field currently hosts Carnegie Mellon Silicon Valley and will be the site of Berkeley Space Center, a new campus of UC Berkeley. These are within the base primarily to support the academic and research collaboration between these institutions and NASA Ames.

=== Private aircraft ===
Moffett Airfield is home to H211, LLC, owned by Google founders Larry Page and Sergey Brin. Through the LLC they pay $1.3 million a year to NASA to park their Boeing 767-200 and Gulfstream V jets. The airplanes have also had scientific equipment installed by NASA to allow experiments to be run in flight.

Lockheed Martin and Jon Stark, a helicopter operator, also have use of the airfield.

In October 2008 the first Zeppelin airship to offer private flights in the United States since 1937's Hindenburg disaster became available for tours of the Bay Area and beyond. The 246-foot (75 m) craft, operated by Airship Ventures, was housed in Hangar Two, was built in Germany and was the fourth modern airship constructed and the third to be put in public service. It was dedicated and given the name Eureka at the celebration of Moffett Field's 75th anniversary. Zeppelin flights ended in November 2012, and Airship Ventures ceased business. Eureka was disassembled and returned to Germany.

Strong community opposition to the use of the airfield by FedEx Express and UPS Airlines blocked the transition of the airfield to public use in the 1990s.

AirNav.com reports that "Moffett Field is now available to corporate and charter aircraft (jet fuel only)", with prior permission required for landing. Google subsidiary Planetary Ventures has retained contractor Avports LLC to manage the facilities and provide services as a fixed-base operator (FBO).

=== United States Geological Survey (USGS) ===
In 2016, the United States Geological Survey (USGS) announced plans to relocate its West Coast science center from nearby Menlo Park to the Ames Research Center at Moffett Field. The relocation formally began with a ribbon-cutting event in July 2019. As of April 2024 the project was described as "wrapping up", with "full relocation ... scheduled by the end of the year."

== Motor racing ==
On August 16, 1953, the airfield was used for a meeting organised by the Sports Car Club of America. A 5.6 km circuit was created using one of the main runways and adjacent taxiways.

== Assigned units ==
- 129th Rescue Wing, California Air National Guard
- 63rd Regional Readiness Command Headquarters, United States Army Reserve
- 7th Psychological Operations Group Headquarters, United States Army Reserve
- 341st Military Police Company (Combat Support), U.S. Army Reserve
- 341st MP CO, U.S. Army Reserve
- 351st Civil Affairs Command, U.S. Army Reserve
- Marine Corps Recruiting Station San Francisco, Marine Corps Recruiting Command

== Accidents and incidents at or near NUQ ==
- On February 1, 1953, a Republic F-84 Thunderjet burst into flames on final approach. The plane hit the ground near downtown Mountain View, damaging three homes and six cars. The pilot was killed and one person on the ground sustained minor injuries.
- On April 11, 1968, a Royal Australian Air Force Lockheed P-3C Orion burst into flames when the undercarriage collapsed on landing during pre-delivery acceptance trials. There were no fatalities.
- On May 26, 1972, a United States Navy Lockheed P-3C Orion went missing during a routine training flight off the coast of California. All eight crew were presumed dead.
- On April 12, 1973, a NASA Convair CV-990 Coronado, testing survey equipment over Monterey Bay, and a US Navy Lockheed P-3C Orion, practicing touch-and-go landings, collided on final approach. Both aircraft crashed onto Sunnyvale Municipal Golf Course, half a mile short of the runway. All 11 occupants on the Convair 990 Coronado and five of the six crew on board the Lockheed P-3C were killed in the accident. A total of 16 perished on both aircraft with one survivor. Bruce Mallibert.
- On March 21, 1991, two P-3C Orion aircraft from the NAS Moffett Field based VP-50 Blue Dragons had a mid-air collision while on a training mission off the coast of southern California in preparation for deployment to NAS Adak Alaska. All 23 crew members on board the 2 aircraft were killed in the accident. The Chief of Naval Operations was present for the memorial service held at NAS Moffett Field for those crew members.

== See also ==
- Navy Air Stations Blimps bases
- Bayshore-NASA (VTA) light rail station
- California during World War II
- California World War II Army Airfields
- List of military squadrons and aircraft based at Moffett Field
- Watsonville Airport Moffett Field, auxiliary field in World War II
