= VP-31 =

Patrol Squadron 31
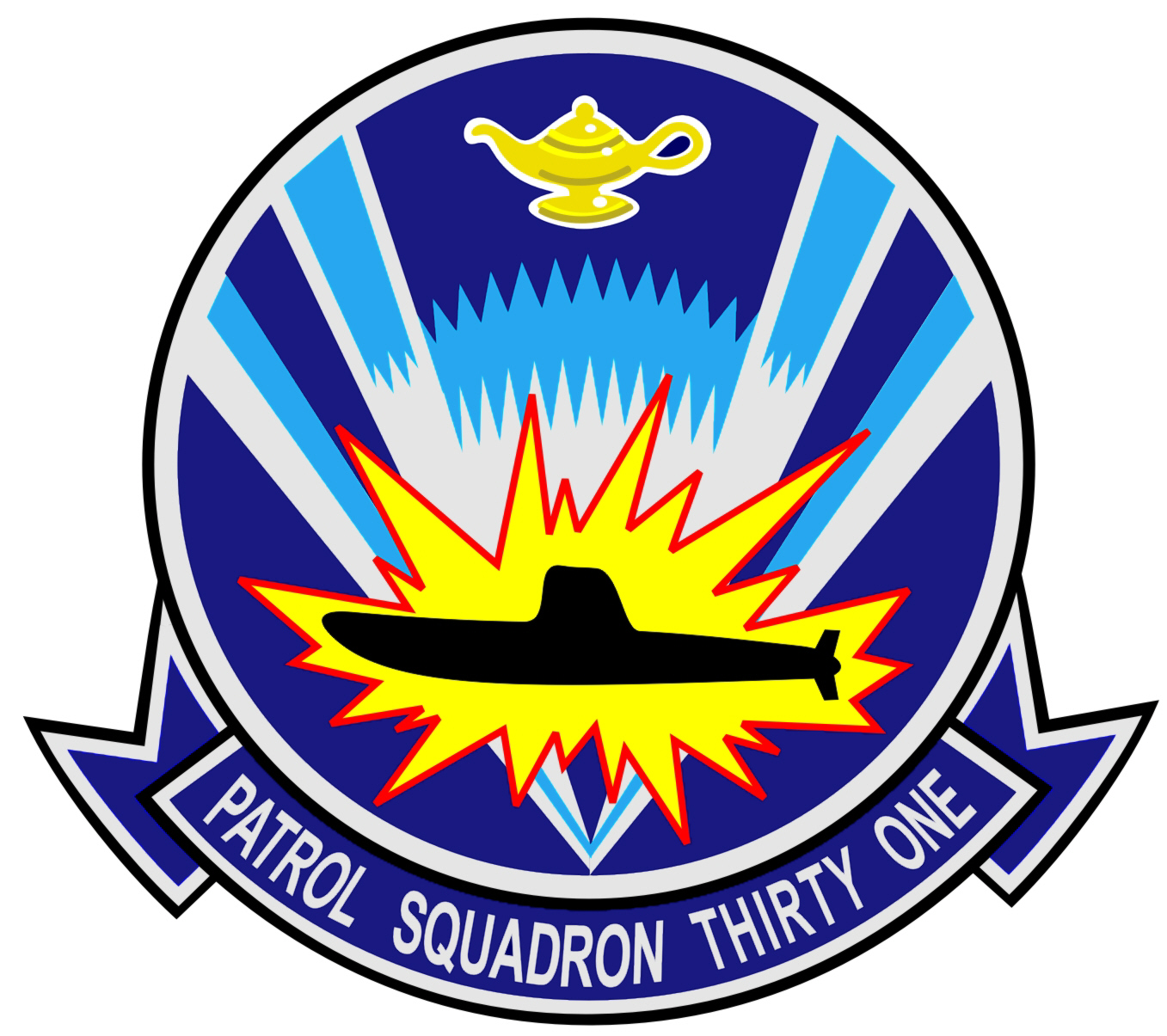
- VP-31 Unit Insignia
- Active: 30 June 1960 – 1 November 1993
- Country: United States of America
- Branch: United States Navy
- Type: Squadron
- Role: Training replacement aircrew and maintenance personnel for all Pacific fleet maritime patrol squadrons
- Part of: United States Navy
- Garrison/HQ: Naval Air Station Moffett Field, Sunnyvale, California
- Nickname(s): Genies (1962–1971); Black Lightnings (1971–1993)
- Decorations: Meritorious Unit Commendation

Aircraft flown
- Patrol: P2V-5/SP-2E P2V-7/SP-2H; P5M-2/SP-5B; R5D-5/VC-54S; R7V-1/C-121J; UF-1/SHU-16B; P-3A/B/C/TP-3A

VP-31, Patrol Squadron 31 was a maritime patrol squadron of the United States Navy. It was established on 30 June 1960 to train replacement aircrew and maintenance personnel. It was disestablished on 1 November 1993.

== Insignia ==
The only insignia for VP-31 was approved on 25 July 1962, and was selected to represent the anti-submarine warfare (ASW) training program used to educate patrol squadron aircrew of FAW-14. The central figure of the design was a submarine at the focal point of four beams from on high. Above the submarine was a magic lamp from which issued a wisp of smoke. The lamp signified the squadron's original nickname, the Genies. The design was circular, with a scroll at the bottom containing the designation Patrol Squadron Thirty One. Colors: outline of design, lamp and beams, silver and gold; lamp and submarine trim, red; central portion of beams, cream; background of design and submarine, deep blue. The squadron's nickname was Genies from 1962–1971 and Black Lightnings from 1971–1993.

== History ==
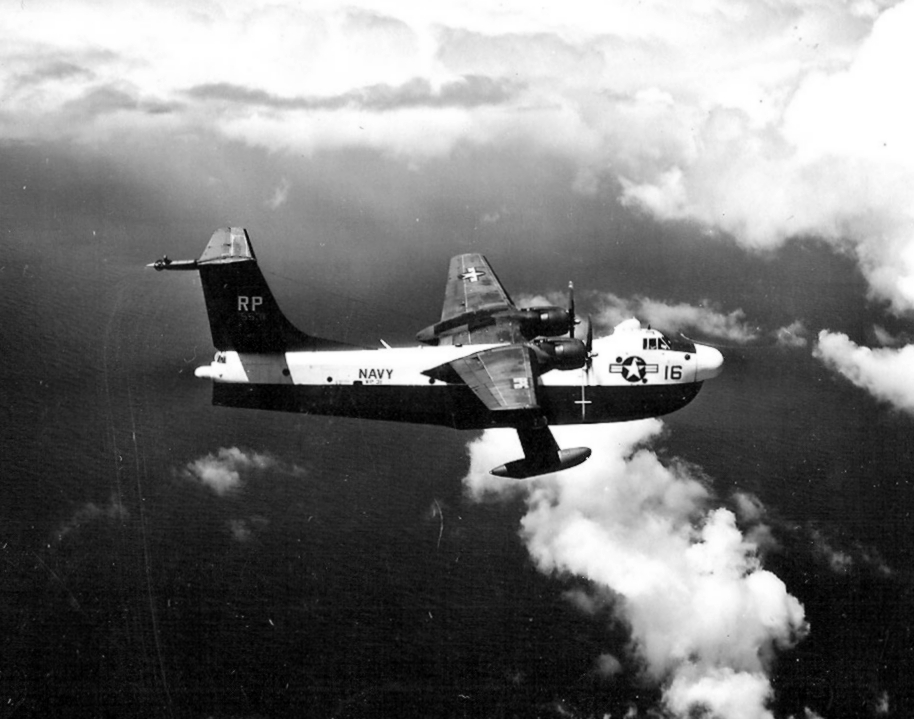
VP-31 P5M-2 in 1962

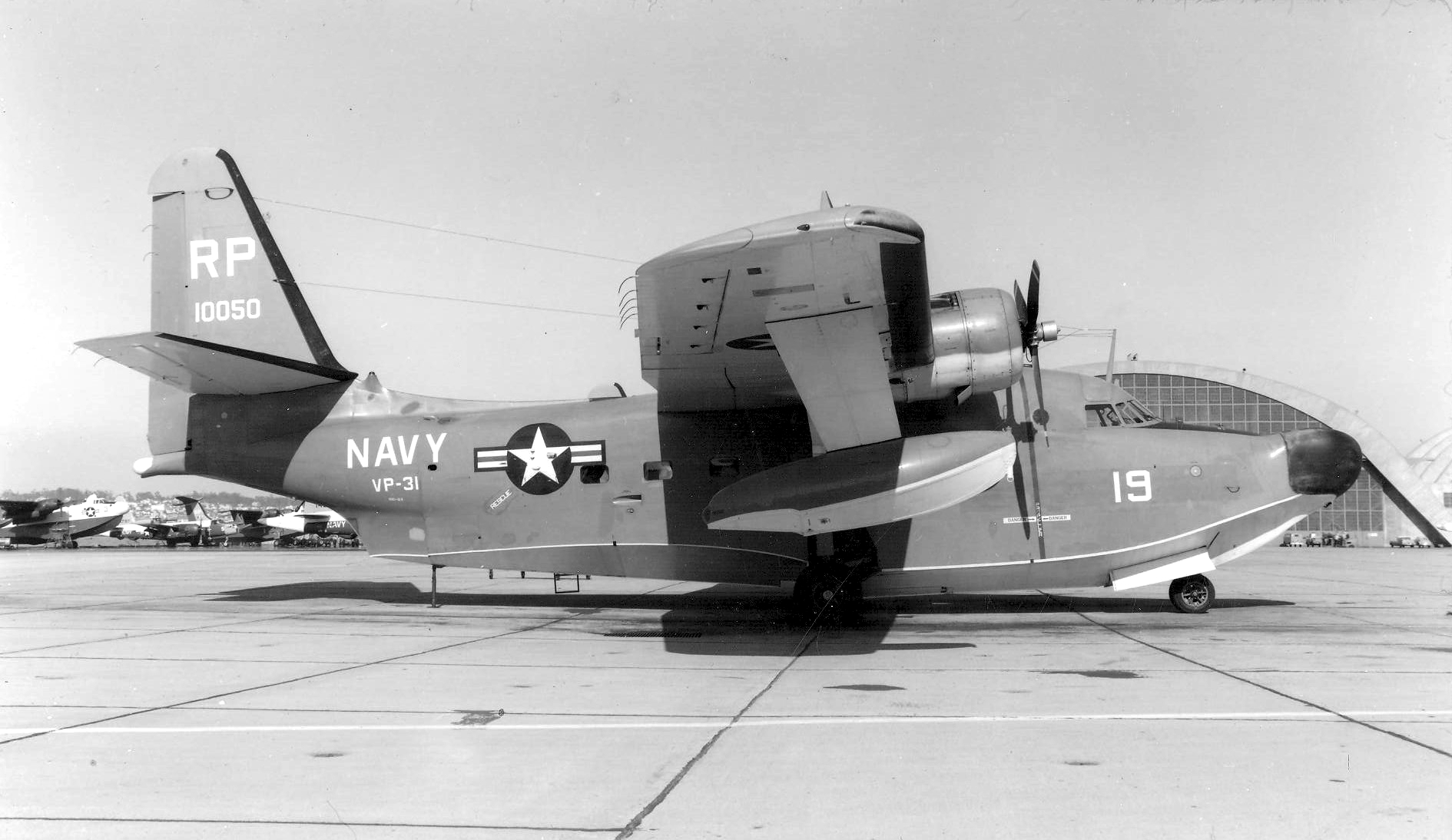
VP-31 SHU-16B at NAS North Island in the 1960s

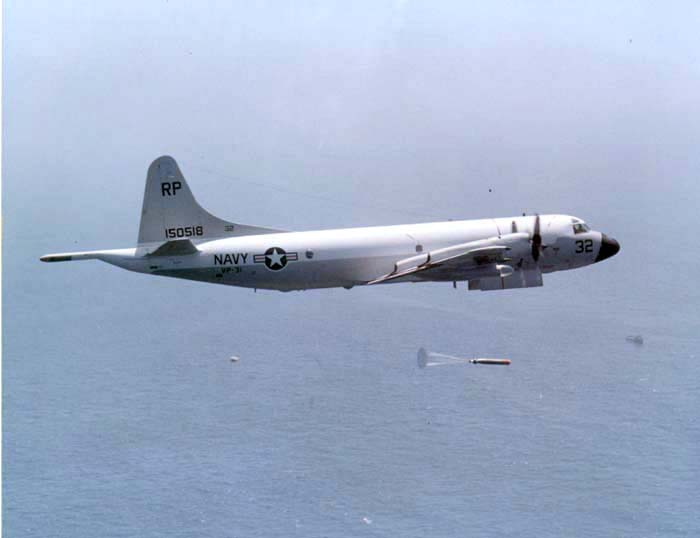
VP-31 P-3A dropping a torpedo

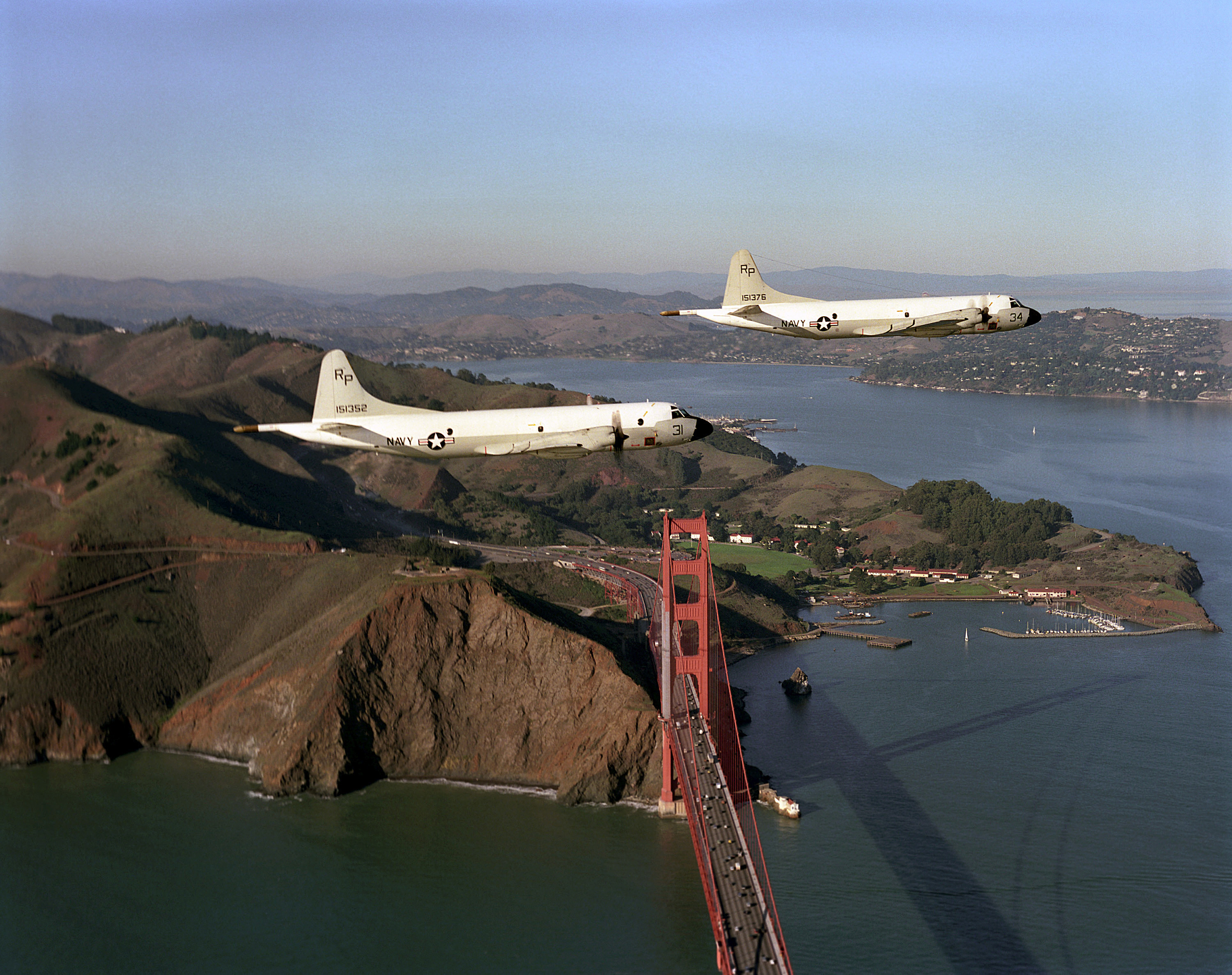
VP-31 P-3s over the Golden Gate Bridge in 1989

- 30 June 1960: VP-31 (later DETNI) was established at Naval Air Station North Island, San Diego, California. The primary mission of the squadron was training replacement aircrew and maintenance personnel for all Pacific Fleet patrol squadrons, administrative control of the sonobuoy buildup shop and all class D maintenance for all patrol squadrons on North Island. Limited training was begun soon after the squadron's establishment, but it was not until the fall of 1960 that a complete staff of 20 officers and 300 enlisted personnel were engaged in full-scale training operations with an inventory of two P2V-5FS Neptunes, two P2V-7S, and one R5D Skymaster.
- November 1961: The squadron's responsibilities were expanded to include training foreign personnel transitioning to the P2V-7. Seventy-two members of the No. 10 Squadron RAAF were among the first foreign students to be assigned for training in this aircraft. Two UF-1s seaplanes were assigned to VP-31 and converted to ASW specifications for training air force personnel from Norway, Chile, Colombia, Peru, and Spain.
- 4 January 1963: VP-31 Detachment Alpha was established at Naval Air Station Moffett Field Its primary mission was to train pilots and aircrewmen for the advanced ASW aircraft, the P-3 Orion. The squadron's P-3 aircraft averaged 8,600 flying hours a year in training missions.
- 8 January 1966: VP-31 Detachment Alpha moved from Hangar Three into historic Hangar One at NAS Moffett Field. Hangar One, now a Naval Memorial site, was built in April 1933 as a home for the Navy's largest dirigibles, USS Macon her sister ship, USS Akron. The vast 10,000-square-foot (930 m^{2}) structure provided much needed space for the constantly expanding operations of the squadron.
- 1 July 1966: Detachment Alpha at NAS Moffett Field, was renamed Detachment Moffett. The parent squadron remained at NAS North Island.
- 1 January 1967: Detachment Moffett became the parent element of VP-31, and the unit at North Island became Detachment North Island. This change occurred to accommodate the increasing numbers of students receiving training on the P-3 airframe. Detachment North Island discontinued training on the P-5 Marlin when the Navy ceased seaplane operations in 1967, but continued to provide training to crews on the P-2 Neptunes until its disestablishment in 1970.
- 6 March 1969: All six crewmembers of the squadron's P-3A, BuNo. 152765, RP-07 died when it crashed at Naval Air Station Lemoore, California, at the end of a practice ground control approach (GCA) landing.
- 1 January 1970: VP-31's Detachment North Island was disestablished, having trained over 2,000 pilots, 700 Naval Flight Officers, and 10,600 aircrewmen/maintenance personnel.
- 7 July 1971: VP-31 received CNO approval for the P-3A/B Fleet Replacement Aviation Maintenance Program (FRAMP), designed to train aircrew and ground personnel in the transition from older model P-3 Orions to the newer versions.
- 26 May 1972: A VP-31 P-3A, BuNo. 152155, failed to return to NAS Moffett Field at the completion of a routine training flight. Search operations by Navy, Army, Air Force and Civil Air Patrol aircraft continued for seven days, but no trace of the missing aircraft was ever found. Two crewmen, three personnel under instruction and three observers were listed as missing and presumed dead.
- June 1974: VP-31 was tasked with training Iranian Navy aircrews on the specially configured version of the Orion, the P-3F, that would be used by that country's military for maritime patrol. Flight training/familiarization was completed in December, with all aspects of the support/maintenance training syllabus completed by 6 June 1975.
- January 1984: VP-31 began the transition of Pacific Fleet patrol squadrons to the P-3 aircraft with enhanced avionics configurations. In one 15-month period, the squadron received 22 aircraft for extensive avionics modifications. In the years following, VP-31 averaged 16 to 18 Orion modifications every 12 months.
- 1 November 1993: VP-31 was disestablished due to the closure of NAS Moffett Field and the consolidation of training resources into one VP training squadron, VP-30, based at NAS Jacksonville, Florida.

== Home port assignments ==
The squadron was assigned to these home ports, effective on the dates shown:

- NAS North Island, California - 30 June 1960
- NAS Moffet Field, California
  - (Det Alpha) 4 January 1963
  - (Det Moffet) 1 July 1966
- NAS Moffett Field - 1 January 1967

== Aircraft assignment ==
The squadron first received the following aircraft on the dates shown:

- P2V-5/SP-2E - July 1960
- P2V-7/SP-2H - July 1960
- P5M-2/SP-5B - September 1960
- R5D-5/VC-54S - July 1960
- R7V-1 - June 1961
- C-121J - June 1961
- UF-1/SHU-16B - October 1961
- P-3A - February 1963
- P-3B - December 1965
- P-3C - July 1970
- P-3F - December 1974
- P-3C UI - June 1975
- VP-3A - 1977
- P-3C UII - December 1977
- P-3C UII.5 - 1983
- P-3C UIII - January 1985
- TP-3A - 1986

== See also ==
- History of the United States Navy
- List of inactive United States Navy aircraft squadrons
- List of United States Navy aircraft squadrons
- List of squadrons in the Dictionary of American Naval Aviation Squadrons
