= Naval Base Trinidad =

Major World War 2 base

- NAS Port of Spain
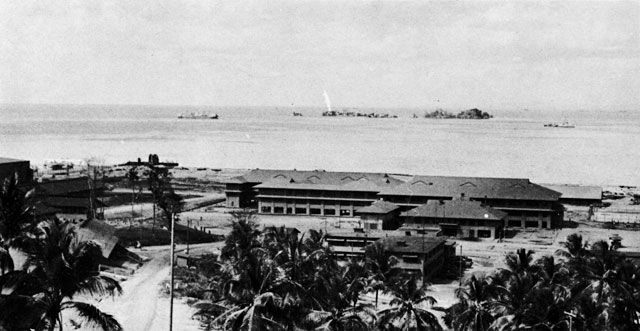
- HQ of Naval Base Trinidad at Carenage Bay

- Location within Trinidad and Tobago Location within the Caribbean Location within North America
- Coordinates: 10.683546°N 61.594780°W
- Country: Trinidad and Tobago
- United States Navy: Naval Base Trinidad
- Commissioned: June 1, 1941
- Decommissioned: 1977

Government
  - Body: United States Navy

Population
  - Total: Peak 135,000 Troops on Island
- Time zone: UTC-4 (AST)

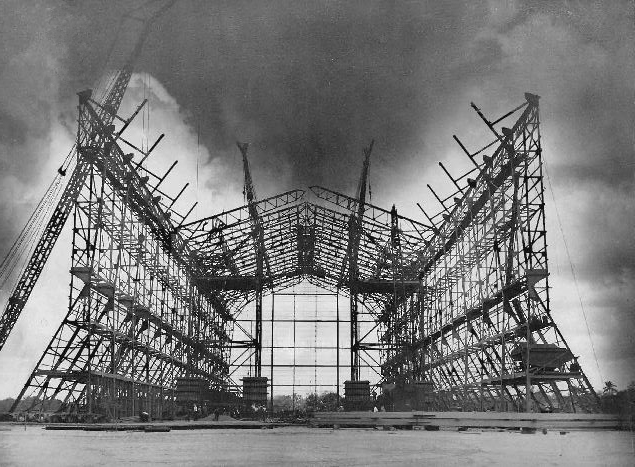
African American Seabees of the 80th Seabees erecting an Airship Hangar at Carlsen Field Trinidad

Naval Base Trinidad, also called NAS Trinidad, NAS Port-of-Spain, was a large United States Navy Naval base built during World War II to support the many naval ships fighting and patrolling the Battle of the Atlantic. The fighting in the area became known as the Battle of the Caribbean. Naval Base Trinidad was located on the Island of Trinidad in West Indies of the Caribbean Sea.

The base also supported the United States Army Air Forces, United States Coast Guard, US Marine Corps and US Army. Naval Base Trinidad was a US Naval Advance Base built to protect the shipping lanes to and from the Panama Canal from U-boat attacks, by sea and air. The base did fueling, loading and unloading of cargo ships. The base also became a repair depot, with auxiliary floating drydocks that were able to repair boats and ships in the field. Naval Base Trinidad was commissioned on June 1, 1941, and at its peak it had 135,000 troops on the island.

== History ==
After Adolf Hitler’s declaration of war against the United States on December 11, 1941, U-boat operations were extended to East Coast of the United States, Gulf of Mexico, and to the Caribbean. So Naval Base Trinidad became a key to keeping Panama Canal, Venezuela oil and the Caribbean open. The US Navy and US Army landed on Trinidad on September 2, 1940. Much of Naval Base Trinidad was built by private contractors in 1941 and in 1942 expanded by the Seabees of Naval Construction Battalions. Naval Base Trinidad also was a training center for troops preparing for war. Trinidad supported US Navy subbases in St. Lucia and British Guiana. The base also supported emergency advance bases on the northeastern coast of Brazil.

Naval Base Trinidad and seven other bases in the Caribbean became known as Destroyer Bases. This name came from the U.S.-British Destroyers for Bases agreement which exchanged older US destroyers for U.S. rights to operate Advance Bases in the Atlantic. This was done so the US could have tactical bases, patrol aircraft and ships to control the Caribbean Sea. Trinidad, Bermuda, Santo Domingo and Argentia became major bases. The US Navy started construction at Trinidad on January 193, 1941. Over 10,000 Trinidadian workers were hired for the construction projects. Trinidad, off the coast of Venezuela, was key to protecting South American trade routes and the Panama Canal. The Naval Base was built on the northwest tip of the island on 7,940 acres, this included the land on five small islands in the Gulf of Paria. Later 3,800 more acres were added to the base, but only 1,200 acres were built up. Four bays were used for Naval activities: Carenage, Chaguaramus, Teteron, and Scotland. Two major land bases were built at Chaguaramus (Chaguaramas Naval Base) and Tucker (Tucker Naval Base).

The second task after the port was built, was building a naval air station and a seaplane base at Carenage Bay. The Gulf of Paria was used for major fleet anchorage. Carenage Bay was also built up as a major port with the construction of a 500-by-50-foot tender pier. Both bays had major dredging projects done, so the port could support large ships. A 200 men team worked full-time on a malaria reduction project, due to the swamps in the area. Teteron Bay became a major navy depot. Seabees arrived at Trinidad on December 30, 1942. The Seabees of the 30th, 83rd and 11th Construction Battalion took over the operation and maintenance of the base from the civilian contractors. The US Army built two major airfields, Waller Field and Carlson Field. Both were also used by the Navy as bases for aircraft carrier fighter aircraft and transport services. Carlsen Field became a US Navy lighter-than-air base in the fall of 1943 when blimps were added to the patrol dues. The 80th Seabees built a large blimp hangar, a mooring post, and a helium purification plant to support the blimps. By May 1944 all major construction had been completed and the 11th Construction Battalion was released. The Bureau of Yards and Docks departed on June 30, 1943.

Trinidad being a large base and training center did not close after the war, like many other bases. Troops departed in 1967, the base closed in 1977, and the lease of the land was given up by the US in 1988. Today the base headquarters are a hotel and convention center.

During that period, many calypsos made reference to the American presence in Trinidad.

== Background ==
The Battle of the Atlantic began on September 3, 1939, and by 1941 the United Kingdom (UK) needed help in protecting shipping from British Overseas Territories. The British Overseas Territories had become a lifeline to the UK during the war. France was defeated by Nazi Germany in June 1940. The United States at this time was neutral. Thus England, the British Commonwealth and British empire was alone in the war against German and Italian Fascism. The 50 destroyers, in the base for destroyers deal of September 2, 1940, were Caldwell, Wickes, and Clemson class. The destroyers were transferred to the Royal Navy from the US Navy. The United States received rent-free 99-year leases of US bases on the British controlled islands of Newfoundland, Bermuda, Trinidad, Great Exuma, Jamaica, Antigua, St. Lucia, the Bahamas, and one in British Guiana. The deal was done by President Franklin Roosevelt by executive agreement, without congressional approval. West coast of Trinidad with the Gulf of Paria was part of the deal.

Later in the year the United States transferred ten Lake-class Coast Guard cutters to the Royal Navy to be used as anti-submarine convoy escorts. The large refinery at Pointe-à-Pierre on Trinidad a key to winning the war.

Pan American Airways developed airports in Latin America in the fall of 1940. This was with the support of the United States, the program was called the Airport Development Program. The goal was to increase United States presence should the US enter the war. Once the US entered the war the US Army and US Navy did take over these Pan American Airways airports. Naval Base Santo Domingo was the other large Caribbean Naval Base.

== Facilities ==
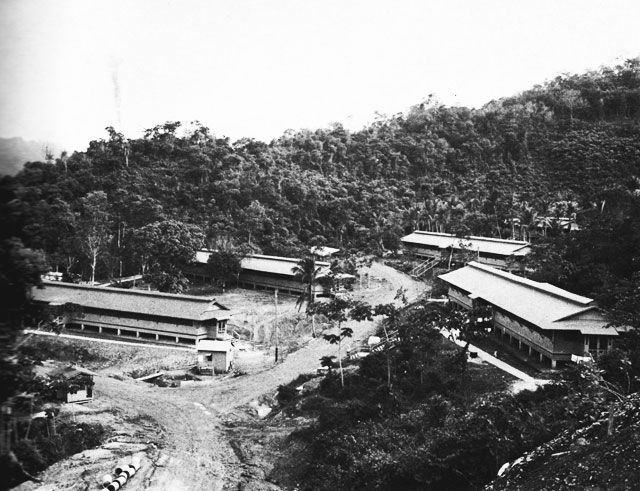
Barracks at Trinidad Naval Base

Naval Supply Depot at Naval Base Trinidad

Trinidad Naval Hospital

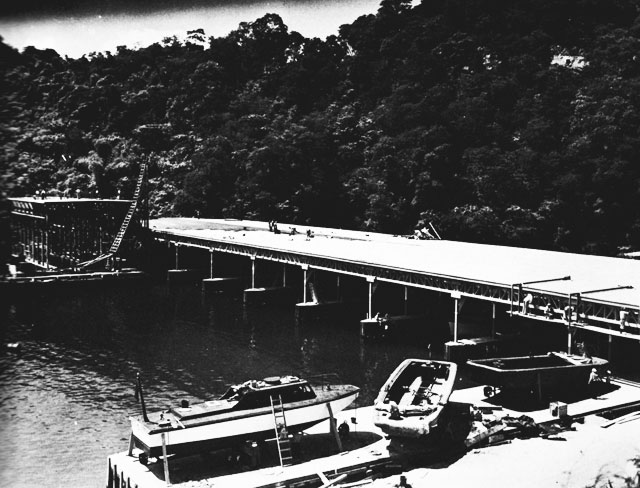
Small Boat Landing Trinidad Naval Base

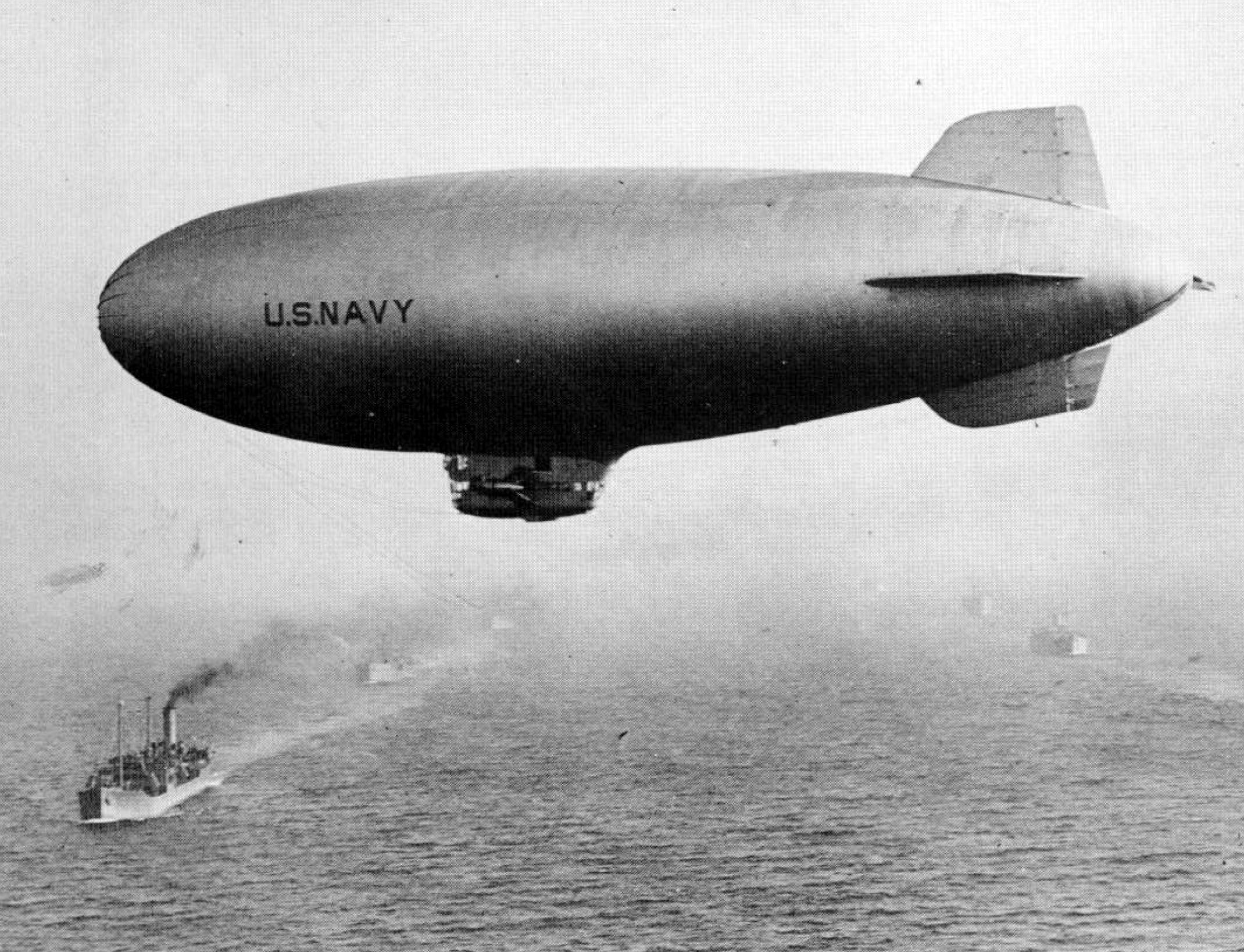
US Navy K-class blimp, used in good weather long patrols

- Total of 11,740 acres, with 1,200 acres were developed
- Most of the base was on the northwest tip of the island on 7,940 acres
- The Base included five small islands in the Gulf of Paria.
- Maqueripe Bay
- Martin PBM Mariner depot
- Four remote natural bays on the northwest peninsula: Carenage, Chaguaramus, Teteron, and Scotland
- Two shore valleys: Chaguaramus and Tucker, both developed
- Carlsen Airfield, 80 paved runways, main "Edinburgh" and "Xerxes" runways (used by Army and Navy), became Carlsen Air Force Base
- Piarco Airport (Army and some Navy)
- Crown Point emergency landing strip
- Waller Army Airfield (Army and some Navy)
- Chaguanas, Edinburgh Field
- Power station
- Water treatment plant
- Naval harbors for anchoring Carenage Bay
- Naval Headquarters at Carenage Bay
- Two Naval pairs at Carenage Bay, 350 feet - 600 feet
- Naval Hospital in upper Tucker Valley
- Two wooden floating drydocks, 3,000-ton and 1,000-ton capacity, built on the site
- Degaussing range on Pelican Island
- Radio station - Chaguaramus Valley
- Hangars
- Ship repair facilities
- Net Lying base, support by Hopocan (YNT-1) and over Net Tender ships
- Blimp hangar
- Air traffic control
- Chaguaramas training base
- Tardieus' land at Scotland Bay recreation area and zoo
- Seven-mile road over jungle mountains to Maracas Bay over Mount Pleasant (North Coast Road)
- Princess Margaret Highway
- AFDM-3-class medium auxiliary floating dry dock
- (Fort Read, mostly US Army)
- Officers Club
- Seaplane base at Carenage Bay
- 500-by-50-foot tender pier at Carenage Bay
- Motor pool
- Malaria reduction depot
- Quarry
- Naval Supply Depot - fleet warehouses
- Crash boat base
- Aviation Overhaul shop
- Quartermaster Laundry
- Torpedo assembly center
- PT Boat base
- Tank farms for: Fuel oil, aviation fuel, diesel fuel, gasoline
- Barracks
- Navy Bank
- Fleet Post Office FPO# 117 NY Trinidad, British West Indies
- Mess halls
- Navy Communication Center
- Troop store
- Military supply depot
- AA gun emplacements
- Naval Air Transport Service Facilities

== Sub-installations ==
Secondary bases: Naval Base Trinidad headquarters managed and supplied logical support for subsidiary satellite Bases, also called emergency advance bases and NAAF Trinidad.

- NAF St. Lucia, on St. Lucia island north of Trinidad. Port and 221-acres of land at Gros Islet, built Advance base, airbase, seaplane base with tenders. The base was started in February 1941 and had 200 troops based at the camp. The base was decommissioned on September 1, 1943. Base was located at the north end of the island at 14.081°N 60.953°W.
- NAF British Guiana was in British Guiana. NAF British Guiana had a squadron of seaplanes. The Navy had blimps stationed at the Army air base at Atkinson Field, now Cheddi Jagan International Airport. The base was built by civilian workers. NAF British Guiana was 40 miles up the Essequibo River on a 1400-acres of land at 6.445493°N 58.609638°W. FPO#12.
- NAF Dutch Guiana
- NAF Paramaribo and Zandery Field (Army and Navy) at Paramaribo (now Suriname), became Johan Adolf Pengel International Airport. A Paramaribo was a lighter-than-air blimp base, used for U-boat patrols, the base opened in August 1943 and closed in April 1946. FPO#404.

NAF Ipitanga seaplane base at Port of Aratu, Brazil

Brazil Emergency advance bases (Naval patrol bases): On the northeastern coast of Brazil 16 bases, from the Brazil-United States Political-Military Agreement, agreed May 23, 1942. FPO# 335.

- NAF Fortaleza in Fortaleza Harbor, with Pici Field (on Sítio Pécy farm) and "Adjacent Field". The Naval base support large bombers of the AAFBU Unit Fortaleza. A K-class blimp was used for patrol. Fortaleza Pici Field (Chapada do Pici) at location 3.766392°N 38.52199°W. Fleet Post Office (FPO) # was 90. Adjacent Field (Adjacento) at location 3.77667°N 38.540529°W.
- NAF Recife and NOF Recife at Recife, with Ibura Airfield that became Recife Airport. NAF Recife opened on October 1, 1943. Most common plane was the PV-1 Ventura used for patrol. One blimp was used for patrol also. The 150-bed Knox Hospital was built in 1942. The base also had a ship repair depot, to keep destroyers at sea. NAF Recife Fleet Post Office FPO# 120 NY and NOB Recife FPO# 1501. The United States Fourth Fleet worked out the base. The large base was closed in November 1945. At location 8.122297°N 34.926906°W.
- NAF Amapá, on the Mapiá Grande River, had two blimps and three patrol bombers. Base started on September 22, 1942. USAAF was given space for Consolidated B-24 Liberators. FPO# 328. Early on station at the port were the seaplane tender USS Humboldt (AVP-21) and USS Barnegat (AVP-10) to support VP-94. At location 1.389334°N 49.981445°W. NAF Amapá was closed June 30, 1945.
- NAF Belem at Belém harbor, stated on September 22, 1942. Took over Pam American and Brazilian airlines facilities. Naval base with seaplane ramp. Also at the site was the Val de Cans Airfield that became Belém/Val-de-Cans International Airport. Fleet Post Office FPO# 118 NY Belem, Brazil. NAF Belem at location 1.381069°N 48.477995°W. NAF Belem was closed June 15, 1945.
- NAF Parnamirim Field, in Natal became the busiest US air base in 1944. The two runways were the closest to French West Africa, so medium-range planes could use the route to get to Africa and many then on to Europe. The shorter Northern route was often closed due to bad weather. NAF Parnamirim Field house 6,600 troops and seaplane port. Later became Parnamirim Airport and then Natal Air Force Base. Fleet Post Office FPO# 119 NY Natal, Brazil. At location 5.902424°N 35.25151°W.
- NAF Murcipe, Murcipe, Meireles port in Fortaleza. At location 3.725427°N 38.498164°W.
- NAF Maceio, in Maceio, Salvador. A nearby Lake Lagoa do Norte (North Lake) was used as seaplane base starting on June 1, 1941. A runway was used starting on July 22, 1943. FPO# 407.The base had two blimps. NAF Maceio was at location 9.636161°N 35.715472°W.
- Naval Base Camocim at Camocim, FPO# 411.
- Naval Base Canavieiras at Canavieiras, FPO# 329.
- NAF Ipitanga at Ipitanga, Salvador, near Salvador, Bahia, Lauro de Freitas on the Ipitinga River and the Port of Aratu. Port and blimps air base, became Salvador Bahia Airport. Was a Pan American Airways port. Feet Post Office FPO# 150 NY Bahia, Brazil. Port of Aratu base FPO# was 412. NAF Ipitanga was at location 12.914635°N 38.308094°W. NOB Bahia FO# was 1502.
- NAF Tirrical at Tirrical, at Sao Luiz de Maranhao, Sao Luiz opened in 1943, Naval port was in the nearby Rio Bacanga River. FPO# 330. Became the Tirirical Airport. NAF Tirrical was at location 2.582806°N 44.231843°W.
- NAF Igarapu, at Igarapu, Assu, in Cabo de Santo Agostinho. NAF Igarapu was at location 8.276793°N 35.027597°W.
- NAF Fernando de Noronha, on a small archipelago island at Fernando de Noronha. Opened September 5, 1944 with long runway for planes going to French West Africa. NAF Fernando de Noronha had anti-submarine patrols. NAF Fernando de Noronha was at location 3.855529°N 32.425853°W. FPO# 92.
- NAF Caravellas, at Caravellas opened in January 1944 and closed August 1, 1945. NAF Caravellas had two blimps. The runway was used for supplies and emergency landings. FPO# 331. A nearby river was used as a port. NAF Caravellas was at location 17.733782°N 39.264946°W.
- NAF Victoria, at Victoria Airport, seven miles north the city of Vitória, Espírito Santo. Victoria Airport was built in the 1930s. Blimps pad were added by Navy in April 1944. Fleet Post Office FPO# 153, Box C Victoria, Brazil. After war became Eurico de Aguiar Salles Airport at 20°15′29″S 40°17′11″W.
- NAF Rio de Janeiro, at Rio de Janeiro, after war became Rio de Janeiro/Galeão International Airport also in Rio de Janeiro was seaplane base. Fleet Post Office FPO# 153 NY Rio de Janeiro, Brazil. NOB Rio de Janeiro, Naval Base FPO# was 1505.
- NAF Santos Dumont at Santos Dumont Airport, used by US Navy. Fleet Post Office FPO# 153, Box B Santos, Brazil. Santos Dumont Airport located at 22°54′36″S 043°09′45″W
- NAF São Paulo at São Paulo and ships at São Paulo harbor with seaplane base. Located at 23.55°S 46.6333°W.
- Naval Base Ascension Island on Ascension Island in the Atlantic was a naval and air station, it provided anti-submarine warfare operation in the Battle of the Atlantic. FPO# 316.
- NOF Rio Grande at Rio Grande do Sul, Brazil, US Navy anchoring and base. Fleet Post Office FPO# 153, Box A Rio Grande, Brazil. Opened Sept. 11, 1944
- Naval Base Santa Cruz at Santa Cruz, Rio de Janeiro. FPO# 332.
- Naval Base Iguape at Iguape, FPO# 334.
- Centro de Aviação Naval base a Brazil Base at Porto Alegre, was use in part by the US Navy. FPO#153.
- NOF Florianopolis at Florianopolis opened Aug. 23, 1944. Fleet Post Office FPO# 153, Box H Florianopolis, Brazil. Now Florianópolis Air Force Base.

Ecuador Emergency advance base

- Santa Elena Bay seaplane base was built next to a new Army air base at Salinas, Ecuador. Ships had to anchor more than a mile off shore and transfer supplies to small boats. The seaplane base was built in January 1942. A pontoon pier was built and a seaplane base ramp. FPO# was 413. The base had 1,000-barrel of storage tanks.

Honduras advance base

- Naval Base Puerto Castilla at Puerto Castilla, Honduras, on Cape Punta Caxinas, the Navy built a base to tender small craft at route to Cristóbal, Colón Panama and to refuel US Navy seaplanes. The base also was crash boat station. The base opened November 10, 1942 and closed in February 1946. The seaplane base was a naval auxiliary air facility. Some of the work done at the base was by Seabee Naval Construction Battalion Detachment 1012.

Colombia advance base

- Naval Air Base Barranquilla' at Barranquilla, Colombia was Naval air base, and lighter-than-air base, with a repair shop, the land base patrol bombers also used parts of Soledad International Airport, closed in March 1945. The base was used to protect the Caribbean shipping lanes using the Panama Canal and the Colombian oil ports. Some of the work at the base was done by the Naval Construction Maintenance Unit 555.

Panama

- Naval Base Panama Canal Zone a number of Navy bases used protect the Panama Canal and the key shipping lanes around the Panama Canal Zone.

== Allied convoys ==
Naval Base Trinidad and its sub-bases had the role of both hunting for submarines and providing air cover for Allied convoys. Convoys traveling from Key West to Aruba and Trinidad were give the code WAT. Allied convoy code TAW was given for the Trinidad to Aruba and Key West trips. Convoy code for Guantánamo to Aruba and Trinidad was GAT and the return trip TAG. Allies called the shipping lane between Guiana and Trinidad Torpedo Junction as it had many Allies merchant ships. Columbus Channel which separates the southwest corner of Trinidad and Tobago from the coast of Venezuela was given the nickname Serpent’s Mouth.

== U-Boat threat ==
German submarine U-161, as part of Operation Neuland, operated off Trinidad. U-161's second tour was in Caribbean Sea. On February 19, 1942 U-161 damaged the SS British Consul and SS Mokihana off Trinidad. Next she sank the SS Circe Shell, SS Lihue and tanker SS Uniwaleco off St Vincent. At St Lucia she damaged the Lady Nelson and Umtata while in harbor. On March 14, 1942, she sank the SS Sarniadoc a Canadian Steam merchant off Guadeloupe. The USCGC Acacia, a mine planter, March 15, 1942, was sunk of Haiti. U-161 third tour took her to the Brazilian coast. She sank the SS Neuva Altagracia on 16 June 1942. On July 3, 1942, she sank the SS San Pablo in the port of Puerto Limón, Costa Rica. U-161 Fifth tour she sank the SS Angelus off Bermuda on May 19, 1943. On September 20, 1943 U-161 on her sixth tour she sank the SS St. Usk and sank the SS Itapagé on September 26. U-161 was sunk 200 miles of Salvador with loss of all 53 crew menm on September 27, 1943. U-161 was sunk by a PBM Mariner plane from the Salvador Emergency advance bases and the troops of the VP-74.

German submarine U-129 sank the tanker SS Nordvangen off Trinidad on 20 February 10, 1942. On 22 March 1944 U-129 sank the SS Anadyr off Recife, Brazil. U-129 was one of then U-Boats to not be sunk during the war.

German submarine U-156 on June 1, 1942, sank the SS Alegrete of St. Lucia. On June 3, 1942 U-156 sank the SS Lillian south of Barbados. On May 29, 1942 U-156 sank the SS Norman Prince off St. Lucia. On May 21, 1942 U-156 sank the SS Presidente Trujillo off Martinique. On February 20, 1942 U-156 sank the SS Delplata off Martinique. A sea plane sank U-156 on March 8, 1943 off Barbados.

German submarine U-67 U-67 sank the SS Penelope on 14 February 14, 1942 off St. Lucia. U-67 sank six other ships on her next tour off the north coast of South America. On 16 July, U-67 was sunk by a Grumman TBF Avenger with four Mk.7 depth charges.

German submarines U-129, U-502, U-126 also spent time in the Caribbean. Some Italian submarines also patrolled the Caribbean: Luigi Torelli, Leonardo da Vinci, Enrico Tazzoli, Giuseppe Finzi and Morosini.

== US Navy crews ==
US Navy Patrol Bombing Squadron or VPB and VP were stationed at the Naval Base Trinidad and the Trinidad secondary bases. Trinidad VPB and VP were:

- VPB-213
- VPB-134
- VPB-147
- VP-133
- VPB-210
- VPB-34
- VPB-141
- VP-34
- VPB-105
- VPB-92
- VPB-215
- VPB-125
- VPB-112
- VPB-52
- VP-48
- VPB-113
- VP-44
- VPB-94
- VP-AM-1
- VPB-212
- VP-33
- VP-29
- VP-2
- VP-23
- VP-40
- VP-45
- VP-8

== See also ==
- Waller Air Force Base in center of Trinidad
- Bombardment of Curaçao
- US Naval Advance Bases
- United States Naval Forces Southern Command
- Navy Air Stations Blimps bases
