= VPB-52 =

Patrol Bombing Squadron 52
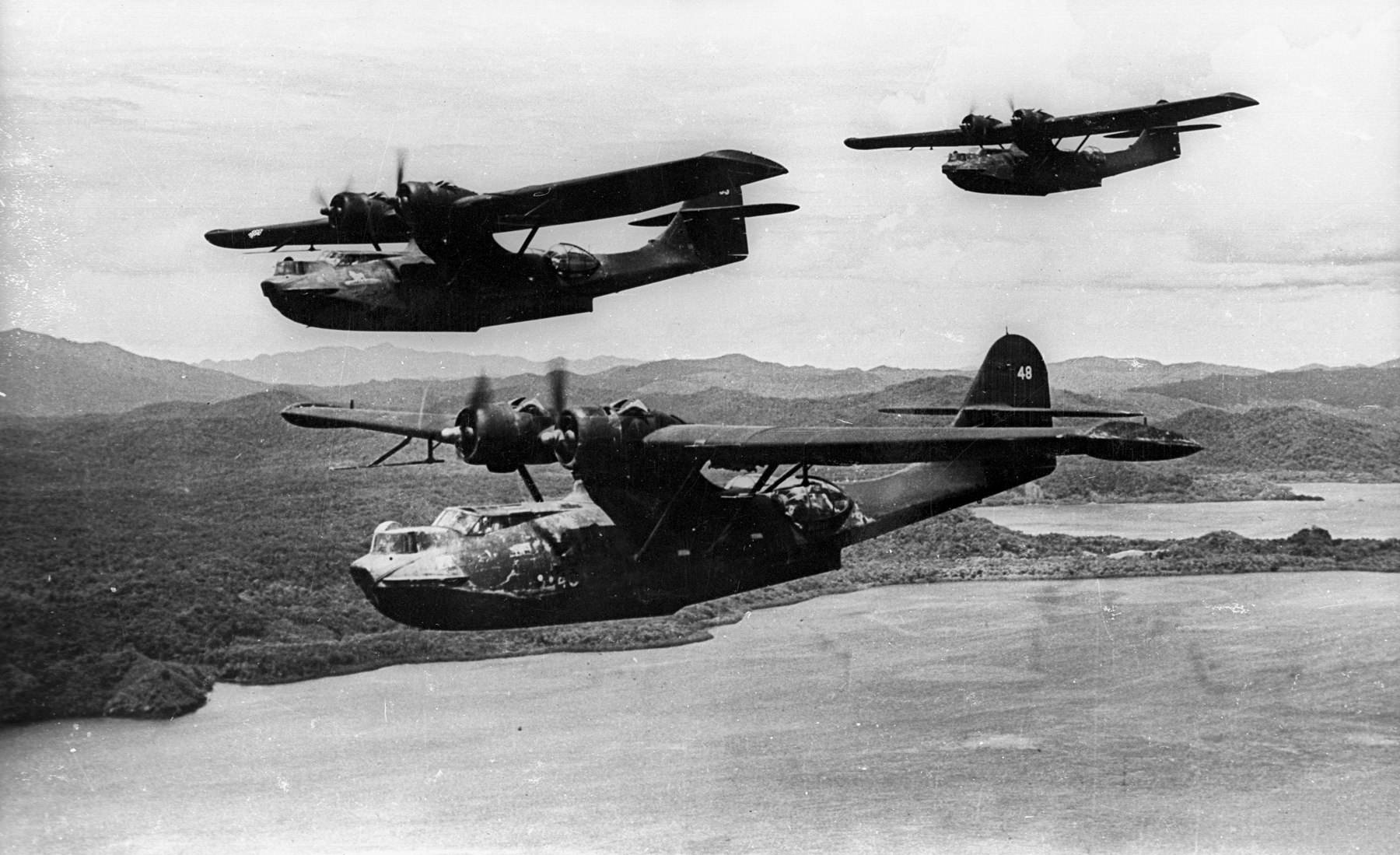
- VP-52 PBY-5 Black Cats, December 1943
- Active: 15 September 1941 – 11 January 1950
- Country: United States of America
- Branch: United States Navy
- Type: squadron
- Role: Maritime patrol
- Engagements: World War II

Aircraft flown
- Patrol: PM-1; P2D-1; PBY-1/2/5

VPB-52 was a Patrol Bombing Squadron of the U.S. Navy. The squadron was established as Torpedo Squadron 3D15 (VT-3D15) on 12 July 1928, redesignated Patrol Squadron 3-S (VP-3S) on 21 January 1931, redesignated Patrol Squadron 3 Base Force (VP-3F) on 17 July 1933, redesignated Patrol Squadron 3 (VP-3) on 1 October 1937, redesignated Patrol Squadron 32 (VP-32) on 1 July 1939, redesignated Patrol Squadron 52 (VP-52) on 1 July 1941, redesignated Patrol Bombing Squadron 52 (VPB-52) on 1 October 1944 and disestablished on 7 April 1945.

== Operational history ==
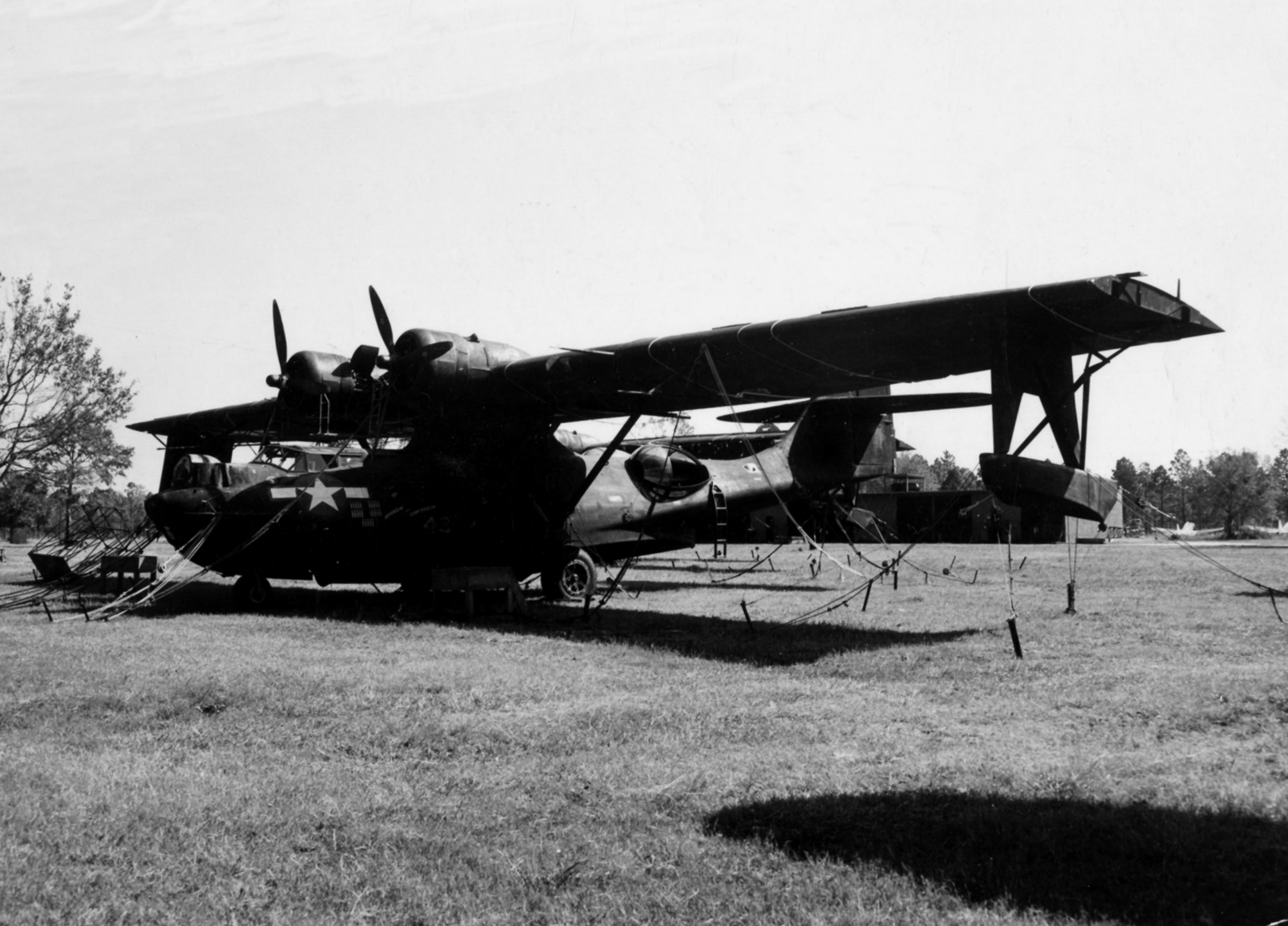
VP-52 PBY-5 at NAS Jacksonville, October 1944

- 12 July 1928: VT-3D15 established at NAS Coco Solo, Panama Canal Zone, as a torpedo bomber squadron flying the T3M-2 twin floatplane. The squadron's primary mission was observation and protection of Coco Solo zone against hostile forces.
- 21 January 1931: VT-3D15 was redesignated Patrol Squadron 3 (VP-3S), Scouting Force, at NAS Coco Solo, with 18 PM-1 aircraft. Training and patrol operations were the order of the day.
- 1 July 1931: NAS Coco Solo, home port for the squadron, was redesignated Fleet Air Base (FAB) Coco Solo. The redesignation of both the squadron and its home port indicated a change in mission from coastal defense to fleet aircraft. VP-3S participated in operations with the fleet in concert with VP-8S, off the coast of Cuba, in a portion of Fleet Problem XII. USS Wright provided tender support. VP-3S returned to FAB Coco Solo on 30 July 1931.
- 17 July 1933: The squadron came under the control of the fleet Base Force Command and was redesignated Patrol Squadron Three Base Force (VP-3F) with 12 PM-1s supported by USS Swan and USS Lapwing.
- 21 April 1934: VP-3F conducted massed flights in exercises with VPs 2F, 5F, 7F and 9F during Fleet Problem XV held off the coast of Panama. The squadron's participation in the problem lasted through 28 May 1934.
- 1 January 1935: VPs 3F and 5F conducted exercises with tenders USS Wright, USS Lapwing, USS Teal and USS Gannet to test the ability of surface vessels to support flying boat operations at remote locations.
- 21–22 June 1937: Twelve PBY-1 Catalinas of VP-3F under the command of Lieutenant Robert W. Morse flew nonstop from NAS San Diego, California, to FAB Coco Solo, completing the 3,292 miles (5,298 km) flight in 27 hours and 58 minutes.
- 1 October 1937: The squadron was redesignated Patrol Squadron Three (VP-3) and became part of the new patrol wing organization under PatWing-3.
- 20 February 1939: VPs 3, 5 and 2 participated in Fleet Problem XX conducted in the Caribbean and coastal waters of South America. PatWing-3 aircraft were part of Black Force, taking part in bombing attacks against White Force vessels. The exercises clearly demonstrated the extreme vulnerability of the slow-moving patrol flying boats against organized antiaircraft (AA) fire of support vessels. An attack on a flying boat base also demonstrated the vulnerability of the aircraft when on the ground or in the water, as compared to dispersion with tenders at remote sites.
- 14 April 1939: Aircraft of VPs 3, 2 and 5 mapped 1,076 miles (1,732 km) of South American coastline from Nicaragua to the Colombian border. The achievement was significant given the prevailing state of the weather during this period and the poor conditions for aerial photography.
- February 1940: VP-32 relieved VP-33 of Neutrality Patrol duty, flying out of NAS Guantanamo Bay, Cuba. The Neutrality Patrol was created in response to the German invasion of Poland in August 1939. This invasion set the stage for global conflict with the potential for Axis surface merchant raiders and submarines to prey on British vessels in U.S. territorial waters. President Franklin D. Roosevelt issued his first proclamation of neutrality on 5 September 1939, declaring waters within the territorial jurisdiction of the U.S. off-limits to military operations of belligerent powers. The Neutrality Patrol would extend east of Boston and south of Trinidad in the Caribbean. VPs 51, 52, 53, 54 and 33 were the first squadrons to be assigned to the Neutrality Patrol, supported by four tenders.
- 29 Jun 1940: VP-32 was relieved by VP-33 on Neutrality Patrol duty.
- 1 June 1941: After VP-32 was relocated to its home port at NAS Norfolk, Virginia, the squadron turned in its well-used PBY-2 and PBY-3 aircraft, obtaining six new PBY-5s at NAS San Diego. Six more aircraft were flown to NAS Norfolk on 7 July 1941.
- 17 July 1941: VP-52 personnel and material were loaded aboard USS Curtiss for transport to NAS Guantanamo Bay, Cuba, to relieve VP-81. Using NAS Guantanamo as a base of operations, the squadron conducted an aerial survey of Bermuda, Cuba and Great Exuma Island. During these operations tender support was provided by USS Albemarle and USS George E. Badger. VP-52 returned to NAS Norfolk in August 1941 to prepare the squadron for redeployment to South America.
- 23 August 1941: A six-aircraft detachment was sent to NS San Juan, Puerto Rico, for Neutrality Patrol duties.
- 5 November 1941 - March 1942: All of VP-52's well-worn PBY-5s were turned over to VP-51 in exchange for its new PBY-5 patrol planes. Commencing immediately after the exchange, the squadron deployed to NAF Natal, Brazil. After five months of operations from NAF Natal, VP-83 relieved VP-52 of patrol duties and returned to NAS Norfolk in March 1942.
- 23 April 1942: The VP-52 administrative staff remained at NAS Norfolk, while the aircrews and support staff deployed to NAS Bermuda. Once on station, the squadron conducted convoy protection and Anti-submarine warfare (ASW) patrols in the central Atlantic.
- May 1943: VP-52 turned over six crews and six PBY-5 aircraft to VP-31 at NAS Pensacola, Florida, and the remaining members of the squadron were sent to NAS San Diego. Upon arrival, the crews and support personnel began preparations for a trans-Pacific flight, while the crews with VP-31 at NAS Pensacola participated in ASW duties in Caribbean waters.
- 31 May 1943: With the squadron reunited, the support staff, ground crews and material departed aboard USS Long Island for NAS Pearl Harbor, Hawaii. Two days later the aircrews began the trans-Pacific flight from San Diego to Pearl Harbor.
- 9 June 1943: Five aircraft and six crews were deployed to Kanton Island for training and patrol duty, with a three-aircraft detachment sent to Johnston Atoll.
- 2 July 1943: Seven aircraft and seven crews were deployed to Midway Island for training and patrol duty.
- 30 July 1943: The squadron was reunited at NAS Kaneohe Bay, Hawaii, to prepare for deployment to Seaplane Base Nedlands, Perth, Australia.
- 7 August 1943: VP-52 arrived at Perth, Australia, and commenced reconnaissance patrols and operations from advanced bases in the southwest Pacific. Detachments were located at Exmouth Gulf, Geraldton and Perth.
- 16 October 1943: VP-52 commenced Black Cat operations from Palm Island and New Guinea.
- 22 November 1943: The squadron was transferred to Namoai Bay, New Guinea, where it conducted Black Cat night anti-shipping patrols at masthead levels.
- 25 November – 23 December 1943: Lieutenant Alex N. McInnis Jr. led his crew on night missions against enemy combatants and convoys in the Bismarck Archipelago during extremely adverse and hazardous weather conditions. During this period of operation from 25 November to 23 December 1943 he successfully carried out a low-altitude attack on a large merchant vessel. He encountered heavy AA fire, but was able to drop his thousand-pound bomb on the merchant ship, leaving it in flames and still burning three hours after the attack. For his actions during the attacks between 25 November and 23 December 1943 he was awarded the Navy Cross.
- 26 November 1943: Lieutenant William J. Lahodney and his crew conducted a night attack on an enemy task force consisting of a cruiser and three destroyers in the waters off Rabaul. Lahodney's bombs heavily damaged the enemy cruiser, but his own aircraft sustained severe damage with over 100 holes in the wings and fuselage from the intense AA fire. Lahodney managed to fly the perforated Catalina over mountainous terrain and stormy seas for four hours to arrive safely at his home base. For his heroic actions and skillful flying he was awarded the Navy Cross.
- 10 December 1943: Lieutenant (jg) Rudolph Lloyd and his crew made an attack at night on a large enemy freighter in the Bismarck Archipelago under extremely adverse weather conditions. After dropping their bomb on the target, Lieutenant Lloyd returned and made strafing attacks on the ship until it sank.
- 14 December 1943: Lieutenant (jg) Lloyd and his crew conducted a night attack on ships in Kavieng Harbor during adverse weather conditions. A bombing run was made on what appeared to be a small enemy cruiser or large destroyer and two hits were observed. Lloyd returned to make a strafing pass, but was forced to retreat by intense AA fire and the arrival of enemy fighter aircraft. For his courageous actions on the nights of 10 and 14 December, Lieutenant Lloyd was awarded the Navy Cross.
- 13 May 1944: VP-52 conducted missions from Humboldt Bay, Hollandia, in the area of New Guinea, New Britain and in the Bismarck Sea.
- 15 July 1944: The squadron was transferred to Woendi Lagoon where it conducted ASW patrols and Dumbo (air-sea rescue) missions for downed flyers in support of the bombing of Woleai, Truk and Yap islands.
- 18 September 1944: VP-52 operated from NAF Manus, with rotation of detachments to Treasury, Green and Emirau islands.
- 9 December 1944: VPB-52 was reunited for transfer to the United States via NAS Kaneohe Bay, arriving at NAS San Diego, aboard USS Breton on 31 December.
- 7 April 1945: VPB-52 was disestablished.

== Aircraft assignments ==
The squadron was assigned the following aircraft, effective on the dates shown:

- PM-1 - July 1928
- P2D-1 - 1933
- PBY-1 - August 1937
- PBY-2 - February 1940
- PBY-5 - June 1941

== Home port assignments ==
The squadron was assigned to these home ports, effective on the dates shown:

- NAS Coco Solo, Panama Canal Zone - 12 July 1928
- FAB Coco Solo - 1 July 1931
- NAS Coco Solo - 30 September 1939
- NS San Juan, Puerto Rico - 27 March 1941
- NAS Norfolk, Virginia - 1 June 1941
- NAS San Diego, California - 11 Feb 1943
- NAS Kaneohe Bay, Hawaii - 2 June 1943
- NAS San Diego - 9 December 1944

== See also ==
- Maritime patrol aircraft
- List of inactive United States Navy aircraft squadrons
- List of United States Navy aircraft squadrons
- List of squadrons in the Dictionary of American Naval Aviation Squadrons
- History of the United States Navy
