= VP-33 =

Patrol Squadron 33
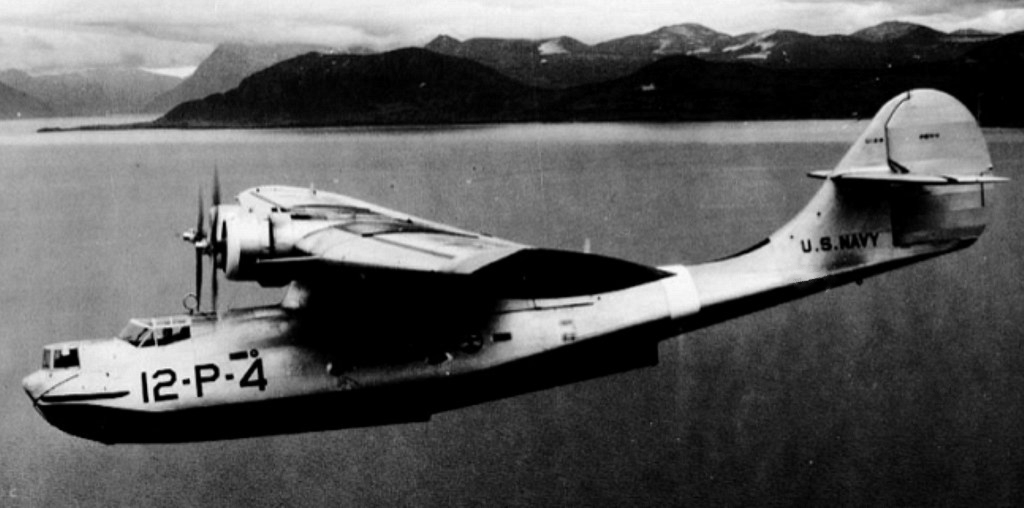
- VP-12 PBY-1 in 1937
- Active: 6 September 1943 – 6 June 1949
- Country: United States of America
- Branch: United States Navy
- Type: squadron
- Role: Maritime patrol
- Nickname(s): Black Cats
- Engagements: World War II

Aircraft flown
- Patrol: PBY-1/2/3/5/5A/6A; PBM-5A

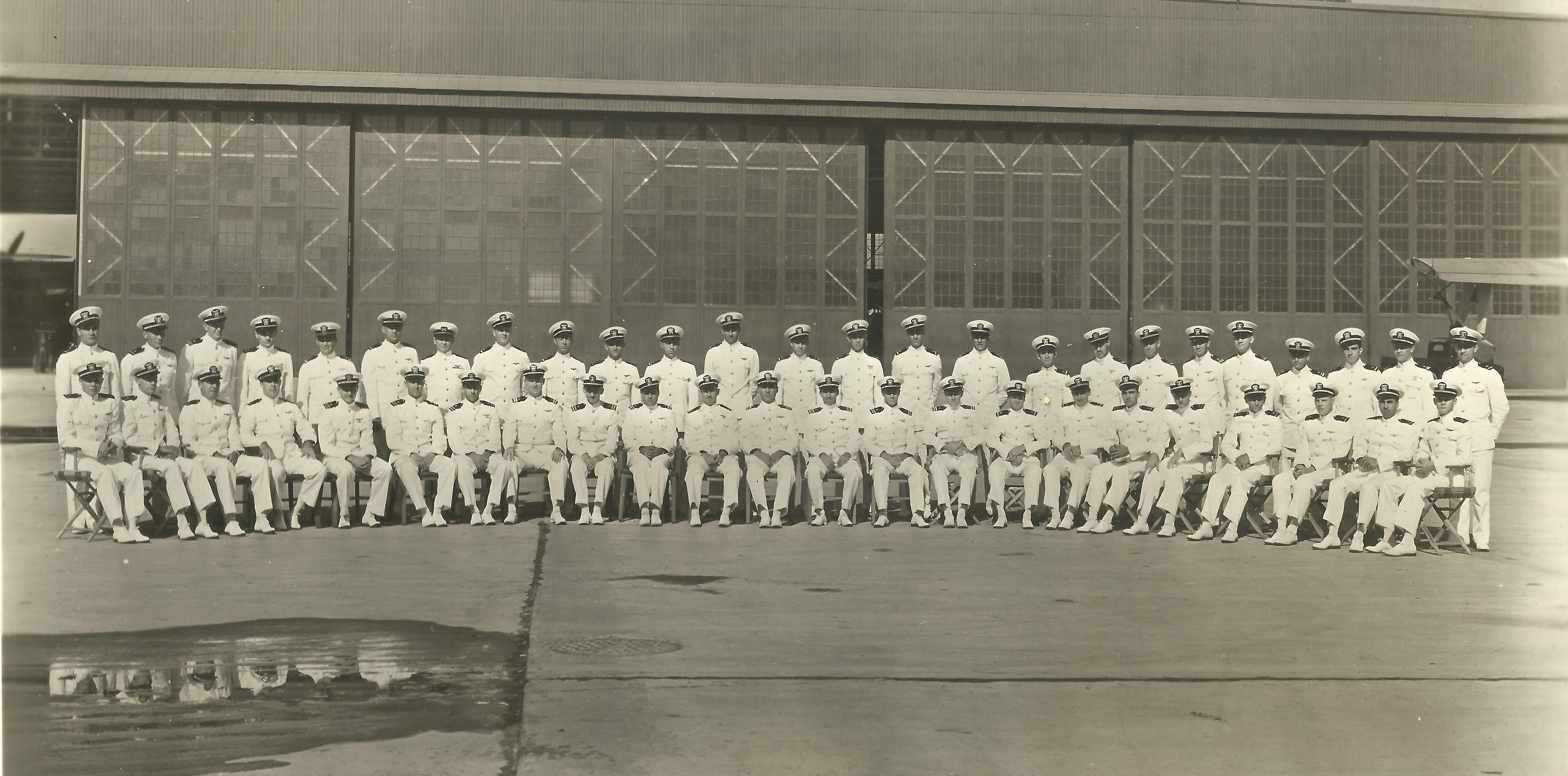
VP-33 Pre-deployment for WW2.

VP-33 was a Patrol Squadron of the U.S. Navy. The squadron was established as Patrol Squadron 12-F (VP-12F) on 1 November 1935, redesignated Patrol Squadron 12 (VP-12) on 1 October 1937, redesignated Patrol Squadron 51 (VP-51) on 1 July 1939, redesignated Patrol Squadron 71 (VP-71) on 1 July 1941, redesignated Patrol Bombing Squadron 71 (VPB-71) on 1 October 1944, redesignated Patrol Squadron 71 (VP-71) on 15 May 1946, redesignated Amphibian Patrol Squadron 3 (VP-AM-3) on 15 November 1946, redesignated Patrol Squadron 33 (VP-33) on 1 September 1948 and disestablished on 15 December 1949. It was the third squadron to be designated VP-33; the first had been redesignated from VP-5 on 1 July 1939 and was in turn redesignated as VP-32 on 1 October 1941. The second VP-33 was redesignated VPB-33 on 1 October 1944.

== Operational history ==
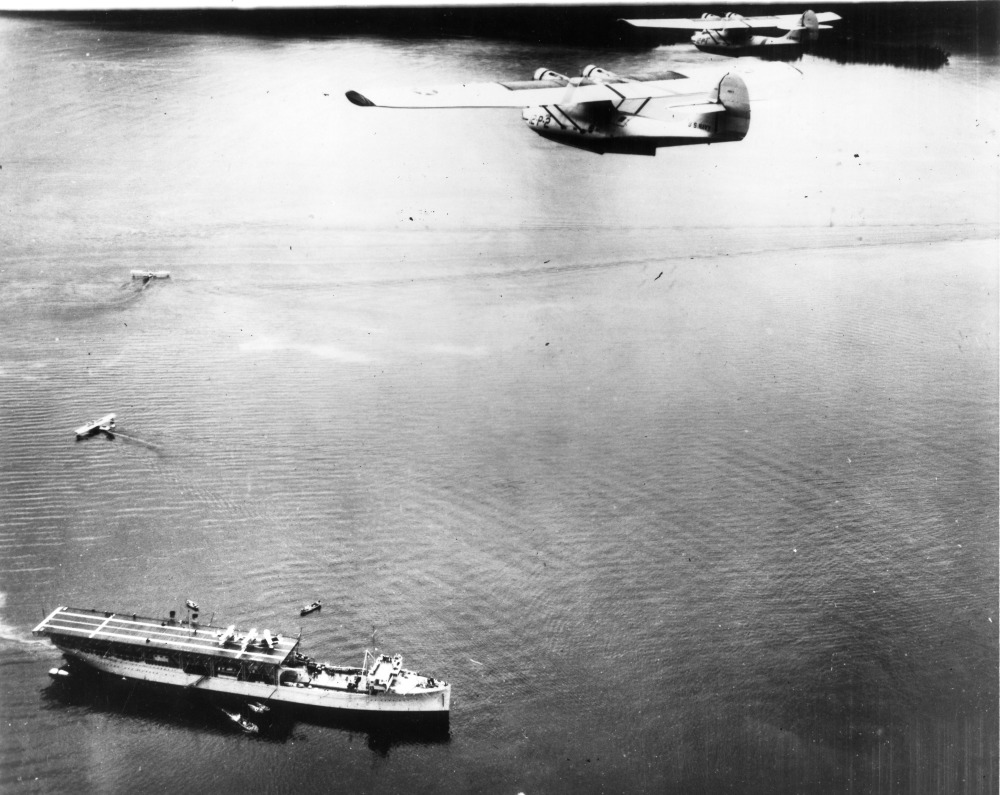
VP-12 PBY-1s overfly USS Langley in Alaska in 1938

- 1 November 1935: Patrol Squadron 12F was established at NAS Seattle, Washington, under the operational control of Base Force. The squadron was equipped later in the year with 12 PBY-1 seaplanes with tender support provided by USS Thrush.
- 1 October 1937: VP-12F was redesignated VP-12 when patrol squadrons were reorganized for operational control under Patrol Wings. VP-12 came under PatWing ONE headquartered at NAS San Diego, California, tender support during this period was provided by USS Langley.
- 17 March 1938: VP-12 and the other squadrons of PatWing-1 (VPs 7, 9 and 11) participated in Fleet Exercise XIX (Phase II) with PatWing-4 (VPs 16, 17 and 19). The two patrol wings were part of WhiteForce operating against Black Force at a distance of 600 miles (970 km). The squadrons were judged to have successfully attacked and damaged major elements of Black Force. The exercise marked the first use of long-distance radio bearings for naval patrol aircraft navigation.
- 25 June 1938: PatWing-1 squadrons departed San Diego for NAS Kodiak, Alaska. The squadrons were deployed for three months in Alaskan waters. During the deployment the squadrons participated in another phase of Fleet Exercise XIX, testing float lights used in marking sites where submarines had been spotted while surfaced. It was determined that the 10-minute burn time of the lights was not long enough and that longer burning lights were required.
- 1 July 1939: VP-12 was redesignated VP-51 and reassigned to a new home base at NAS Norfolk, Virginia, under the operational control of PatWing FIVE.
- 12 September 1939: VP-51 deployed to San Juan, Puerto Rico, to begin the first of the Neutrality Patrols initiated by President Roosevelt's proclamation on 6 September 1939. The objective was to establish an air and ship patrol to observe and report movement of warships of the belligerents. Patrol planes from VPs 33, 52, 53 and 54 were also deployed. VP-51 flew the first patrol on 13 September 1939. Over the next year VP-51's patrols covered harbors and shipping lanes in the West Indies from Puerto Rico to Trinidad, with special attention to the southern approaches to the Caribbean through the Lesser Antilles. The squadron utilized seaplane facilities, including ramps and hangars, of Pan American Airways at the San Juan airport. The crew and supporting activities were housed in tents on the airport grounds.
- 30 December 1940: VP-51 was assigned ferry duties in the delivery of eight older model P2Y aircraft to NAS San Diego, for replacement with new PBY-1 aircraft. VP-51 aircraft had already been distributed to other squadrons of the Neutrality Patrol. After a brief shakedown of the new aircraft at San Diego, the squadron returned to NAS Norfolk.
- 1 March 1941: VP-51 was brought under Task Force 4, Support Force, Atlantic Fleet, along with VPs 52, 55 and 56. The primary objective of the task force was to prevent Axis forces from interfering with the flow of war material from the United States to Great Britain.
- 8 April 1941: VP-51, with nine of its aircraft, were reassigned to NAS Floyd Bennett Field, New York, leaving a detachment of three aircraft at NAS Norfolk. The move marked an expansion of the Neutrality Patrols to provide more convoy coverage and Anti-submarine warfare (ASW) support in the northern offshore shipping lanes.
- 2 June 1941: VP-51 maintained a complement of six aircraft at Floyd Bennett Field, with a six aircraft detachment at NAS Argentia, Newfoundland. On 25 June, two of the aircraft at Floyd Bennett Field were flown to NAS Norfolk to support operations from that location.
- 1 July 1941: Under a general reorganization of fleet patrol organizations, Patrol Wing Support Force was redesignated Patrol Wing 7 (PatWing-7) and VP-51 was redesignated VP-71. VP-71 remained under the operational control of PatWing-7.
- 6 August 1941: The VP-71 detachment of six aircraft at NAS Argentia, along with four aircraft from VP-52, were tasked with conducting aerial surveys of Greenland to determine whether Danish weather stations there were being used by the Germans for the provision of weather information to U-boat Wolfpacks. None were found to be in use by the enemy at that time.
- 17 December 1941: With the start of the war several squadrons were relocated to the West Coast. VP-71 was reassigned to NAS Alameda, California, where the squadron began training for an overseas deployment. The PBY-1 aircraft were turned in for newer PBY-5 models.
- 1 April 1942: VP-71 completed its trans-Pacific flight from San Diego to Pearl Harbor, Hawaii. Upon arrival the squadron was quickly detailed to search sectors with 700 miles (1,100 km) legs out from Oahu.
- 1 May 1942: VP-71 was transferred to Nouméa under the operational control of FAW-1, with tender support provided by USS Tangier. Anti-shipping and ASW patrols were conducted daily. On 26 June the squadron was shifted to USS Curtiss.
- 29 June 1942: VP-71 remained based at Nouméa, with one PBY at Efate and another at Auckland, New Zealand. On 20 July 1942, the squadron was relieved by VP-12 for return to Pearl Harbor.
- 1 September 1942: The squadron maintained ten aircraft at NAS Kaneohe Bay, with one at Pearl Harbor and one remaining with VP-12 at Nouméa.
- 6 February 1943: VP-71 deployed to New Georgia Island. Duties over the next month consisted primarily of routine patrol operations. On 29 March 1943, the squadron was relieved by VB-115 for return to NAS Kanoehe Bay.
- 10 April 1943: VP-71 was split into two squadrons, with half of its assets going to form VB-104. The remaining part of VP-71 was quickly reformed with new personnel and new aircraft.
- 27 June 1943: VP-71, once again up to full strength, was redeployed to Vanikoro Island with tender support provided by USS Mackinac and USS Chincoteague. On 17 July USS Chincoteague was bombed with minor damage. Operations were halted and the squadron and tenders were moved to Halavo Seaplane Base, in the Florida Island chain.
- 14 October 1943: VP-71 was tasked with 650 miles (1,050 km) patrol legs, night spotting and Dumbo (air-sea rescue) operations around New Guinea, Rendova and the Treasury Islands. On 1 November 1943, coverage was provided from this base for the landings at Bougainville.
- 6 March 1944: VP-71 was relieved by VP-81 for return to NAS Kaneohe Bay and transport back to the continental United States. Upon arrival at San Diego on 24 March, the squadron members were given 30 days home leave.
- 25 April 1944: VP-71 was reformed at NAS San Diego, under the operational control of FAW-14. Training of new crews was begun on new PBY-5 aircraft.
- 28 August 1944: The new crews and aircraft of VP-71 completed the trans-Pacific flight to NAS Kaneohe Bay, coming under the operational control of FAW-2. Upon arrival training for combat operations commenced. Patrols were conducted off the coasts of the Hawaiian Islands with a detachment of aircraft at Midway Island conducting operational patrols for that area.
- 1 October 1944: VP-71 was redesignated VPB-71. Aircrews were given advanced training in ASW techniques. A six aircraft detachment was maintained at Midway for flight operations and gunnery practice.
- 10–24 November 1944: VPB-71 deployed to Manus Island, reporting to Commander, Air Seventh Fleet for duty on 13 November. A detachment of two aircraft was loaned to the 2d Emergency Rescue Squadron of the 13th Army Air Force. On the 24th, VPB-71 commenced Black Cat operations in the vicinity of Morotai. Black Cat operations were flown by U.S. Navy Catalina squadrons against Japanese shipping and shore installations at night. Although originally a tactic designed to afford some measure of protection for the highly vulnerable, slow moving seaplanes, Black Cat operations proved so successful that several squadrons were assigned the role. Flat black painted surfaces and the use of radar made the outdated aircraft into a formidable night attacker.
- 19–24 December 1944: VPB-71 was withdrawn from combat operations at Morotai for rest and maintenance of the aircraft. By 24 December the squadron was back in combat operations, this time conducting joint operations with a PT boat flotilla in the area between Morotai and North Halmahera Island.
- 1–11 January 1945: VPB-71 berthed 9 air crews aboard USS Currituck and nine more aboard USS Barataria. On 11 January 1945, the squadron transferred its crews for berthing support from USS Currituck to USS Tangier. During this period, routine searches were conducted between Formosa and the China Coast.
- 1 February 1945: VPB-71 conducted strikes on shipping in the China Sea while operating from tenders in Lingayen Gulf, Luzon, Philippines.
- 1–16 March 1945: VPB-71 relocated to Jinamoc Seaplane Base, Philippines, from which it conducted routine daytime patrols. On 16 March the squadron moved again to Guinan Airbase, Samar, Philippines, where daytime patrols were resumed. The conclusion of the night-bombing campaign for the squadron showed significant results, with VPB-71 credited in sinking eight enemy ships and damaging nine others.
- 27 April 1945: VPB-71 relieved VPB-17 for air-sea rescue operations in the Central Philippines.
- 1 September 1945: The two aircraft detachment assigned to the 13th Army Air Force relocated to Puerto Princesa, Palawan Island. A second detachment of five aircraft was formed on this date from the main body of the squadron located at Samar, and deployed to NAS Sangley Point, Philippines. On 2 September the remainder of the squadron was assigned to weather reconnaissance duties and air-sea rescue missions.
- April–May 1946: VPB-71 returned to the continental U.S., with a homeport at NAS Norfolk.
- January–March 1948: VP-33 deployed to NAS Argentia, Newfoundland, for cold weather operations. It was one of the last deployments by a U.S. Navy patrol squadron with the PBY Catalina. Over the next several months all Catalina aircraft were withdrawn from service and replaced by the PBM-5 Mariner.
- 15 December 1949: VP-33 was disestablished at NAS Norfolk.

== Aircraft assignments ==
The squadron was assigned the following aircraft, effective on the dates shown:

- PBY-1 - December 1936
- PBY-2 - 1937
- PBY-3 - 1938
- PBY-5 - December 1941
- PBY-5A - January 1945
- PBY-6A - January 1946
- PBM-5A - August 1948

== Home port assignments ==
The squadron was assigned to these home ports, effective on the dates shown:

- NAS Seattle, Washington - 1 November 1935
- NAS San Diego, California - 1 October 1937
- NAS Norfolk, Virginia - 1 July 1939
- NAS Floyd Bennett Field, New York - 8 April 1941
- NAS Alameda, California - 17 December 1941
- NAS Kaneohe Bay, Hawaii - 1 April 1942
- NAS San Diego, California - 24 March 1944
- NAS Kaneohe Bay - 28 August 1944
- NAS Norfolk - May 1946

== See also ==
- Maritime patrol aircraft
- List of inactive United States Navy aircraft squadrons
- List of United States Navy aircraft squadrons
- List of squadrons in the Dictionary of American Naval Aviation Squadrons
- History of the United States Navy
