= VPB-134 =

Patrol Bombing Squadron 134
- Active: 29 March 1943 – 25 April 1945
- Country: United States of America
- Branch: United States Navy
- Type: squadron
- Role: Maritime patrol
- Engagements: World War II

Aircraft flown
- Patrol: PV-1

VPB-134 was a Patrol Bombing Squadron of the U.S. Navy. The squadron was established as Bombing Squadron 134 (VB-134) on 29 March 1943, redesignated Patrol Bombing Squadron 134 (VPB-134) on 1 October 1944 and disestablished on 25 April 1945.

== Operational history ==
- 29 March 1943: VB-134 was established at NAS DeLand, Florida, under the operational control of FAW-12, as a medium bombing squadron flying the PV-1 Ventura. After a period of ground training and introduction to the PV-1 Ventura, the squadron was relocated to NAAF Boca Chica, Florida, for shakedown and advanced Anti-submarine warfare (ASW) training, which was completed by the end of July.
- 5 July 1943: Lieutenant Richard R. Barnes and his eight crew members were killed on takeoff from NAS DeLand on the day the squadron began its transfer to NAAF Boca Chica.
- 25 July – 1 September 1943: VB-134 was transferred to MCAS Cherry Point, North Carolina, under the operational control of FAW-5, relieving VB-126. The squadron was assigned patrol sectors, providing four dawn-to-dusk escort cover patrols for convoys along that portion of the eastern seaboard. The PBM squadrons at NAS Norfolk, Virginia, VPs 201 and 203, conducted the daytime patrols over the same sectors. On 1 September administrative and operational control over the squadron was transferred to FAW-9.
- 21 November 1943: VB-134 was sent to the AsDevLant training course for HVAR rocket projectiles at NAS Quonset Point, Rhode Island, returning under the operational control of FAW-5.
- 5 December 1943: Lieutenant Walter Craig was caught by a gust of wind on landing and rolled inverted over the flight line. He applied full power to attempt to pull out, but struck the corner of a hangar before he could recover. The entire aircrew of four, plus five enlisted personnel working in the hangar, were killed in the crash and fire.
- 24 January 1944: The squadron received orders to proceed to NAF Recife, Brazil, to relieve VB-143. VB-134 departed NAS Quonset Point on 24 January 1944, with the last Ventura arriving at Recife on 8 February. Upon arrival the squadron came under the operational control of FAW-16. From this base the squadron conducted dawn-to-dusk coverage of convoys between NAF Rio de Janeiro, Brazil, and NAS Trinidad.
- 16 February 1944: A three-aircraft detachment was sent to NAF Maceió, Brazil, 90 miles (140 km) south of Recife.
- 5 April 1944: The entire squadron joined its detachment at Maceió. A three aircraft detachment was left at NAF Recife, to assist in training the First Brazilian Air Group, also stationed at NAF Recife. Two squadron members were among those who flew to NAS Quonset Point, to pick up new PV-1 Venturas for delivery to the Brazilian Air Group. This detachment remained at NAF Recife until 26 October 1944 when it rejoined the squadron at NAF Fortaleza, Brazil.
- 28 April 1944: VB-134 was relocated to NAF Fortaleza. A three-aircraft detachment was sent to NAF Tirirical Field, Sao Luiz, Brazil. The detachment remained at Sao Luiz until 6 February 1945, when it rejoined the squadron at NAF Fortaleza. NAF Fortaleza was adequate for general purposes, maintenance was the only major shortcoming. The HEDRON assigned there could conduct routine 30 to 60 hour engine checks, but the more extensive 240 hour checks, engine changes and major repairs had to be done at NAF Recife.
- 27 November 1944: Ensign Charles M. Rockwell struck the surface while conducting rocket-firing training at sea approximately 15 miles (24 km) from NAF Maceió. All hands except one were able to exit the aircraft without serious injury before it sank. The cause of the accident was diving at too low an altitude while firing, and running into the water spray from the rockets, ripping off the port engine and starboard propeller. Rockwell was able to recover with the remaining momentum bringing the damaged aircraft back to 200-foot (61 m), then ditching it in a controlled crash. A Coast Guard cutter standing by picked up the men within six minutes of ditching.
- 18 December 1944: Lieutenant (jg) Wolfe and his crew, and four passengers were killed on takeoff from NAF Fortaleza, when his port engine exploded and the aircraft spun into the ground inverted. The crash resulted in a general squadron standdown while all of the aircraft were inspected. Several were found to have major deficiencies requiring several months to make them airworthy.
- 11 February 1945: A detachment was sent to NAF Fernando de Noronha, returning to NAF Fortaleza on 21 February to rejoin the squadron in time to prepare for the return to NAS Norfolk.
- 1 March – 25 April 1945: VPB-134 was transferred to NAS Norfolk, arriving 7 March 1945. Upon arrival the squadron came under the operational control ofFAW-5. All squadron aircraft were turned over to the HEDRON and its personnel given demobilization or extension orders. VPB-134 was disestablished at NAS Norfolk on 25 April 1945.

== Aircraft assignments ==
The squadron was assigned the following aircraft, effective on the dates shown:

- PV-1 - April 1943

== Home port assignments ==
The squadron was assigned to these home ports, effective on the dates shown:

- NAS DeLand, Florida - 29 March 1943
- NAAF Boca Chica, Florida - 5 July 1943
- MCAS Cherry Point, North Carolina - 25 July 1943
- NAS Quonset Point, Rhode Island - 21 November 1943
- NAF Recife, Brazil - 24 January 1944
- NAF Maceió, Brazil - 5 April 1944
- NAF Fortaleza, Brazil - 28 April 1944

== See also ==
- Maritime patrol aircraft
- List of inactive United States Navy aircraft squadrons
- List of United States Navy aircraft squadrons
- History of the United States Navy
