= VP-34 =

Patrol Squadron 34
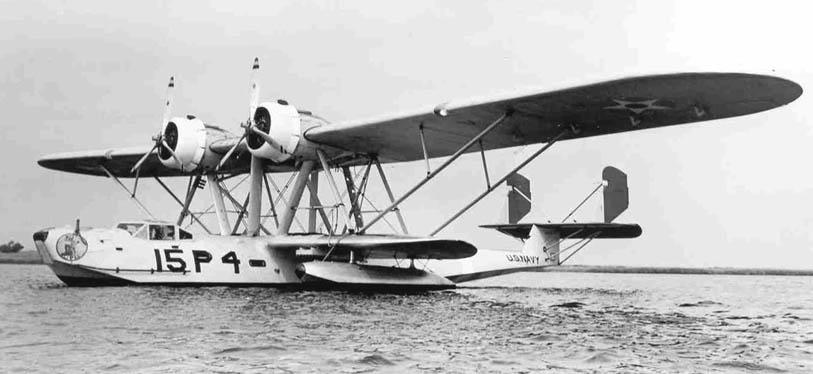
- VP-15 P2Y-2
- Active: 1 September 1936 – 6 June 1956
- Country: United States
- Branch: United States Navy
- Type: squadron
- Role: Maritime patrol
- Nickname(s): Black Cats
- Engagements: World War II

Aircraft flown
- Patrol: P3M-2/P2Y-2/3; PBY-1/2/3/5/5A/6A; PBM-5A/S

VP-34 was a Patrol Squadron of the U.S. Navy. The squadron was established as Patrol Squadron 15-F (VP-15F) on 1 September 1936, redesignated Patrol Squadron 15 (VP-15) on 1 October 1937, redesignated Patrol Squadron 53 (VP-53) on 1 July 1939, redesignated Patrol Squadron 73 (VP-73) on 1 July 1941, redesignated Patrol Bombing Squadron 73 (VPB-73) on 1 October 1944, redesignated Patrol Squadron 73 (VP-73) on 15 May 1946, redesignated Amphibian Patrol Squadron 4 (VP-AM-4) on 15 November 1946, redesignated Patrol Squadron 34 (VP- 4) on 1 September 1948 and disestablished on 30 June 1956. It was the second squadron to be designated VP-34, the first VP-34 was redesignated VPB-34 on 1 October 1944.

== Operational history ==
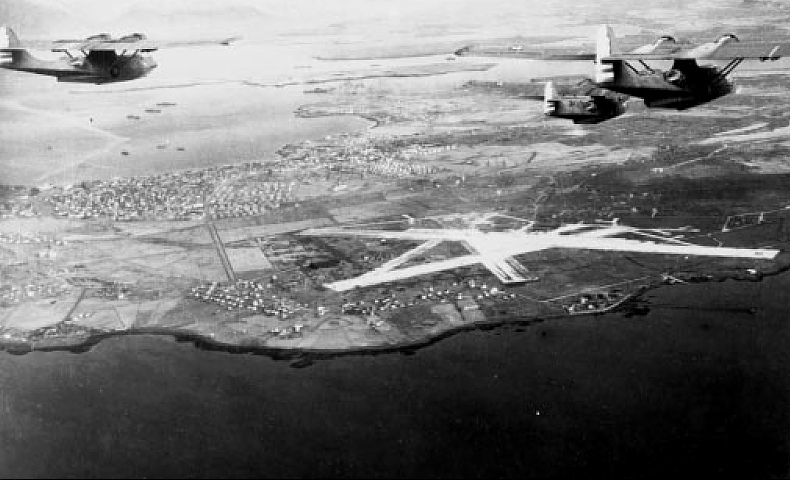
VP-73 PBY-5As returning to Reykjavik in 1942

1 September 1936: VP-15F was established at NAF Annapolis, Maryland, under the operational control of Base Force with six P3M-2 aircraft. Shortly thereafter, the squadron relocated to NAF Norfolk, Virginia. USS Owl provided tender support. Over the next three years, the squadron flew to Annapolis in June and remained over the summer months, providing midshipman aviation training. The squadron returned to its permanent home base at NAF Norfolk each September.

1 October 1937: VP-15F was redesignated VP-15 when the Patrol Wing concept was established. Under this concept patrol squadrons were organized under Patrol Wings and VP-15 came under the operational control of PatWing-5.

October 1938: VP-15 received twelve P2Y-2 aircraft from VP-10 when the latter was refitted with newer replacement aircraft.

April 1939: The squadron received the upgraded P2Y-3

4 September 1939: President Roosevelt inaugurated the Neutrality Patrols in response to the German Invasion of Poland in August. Patrol squadrons 51, 52, 53 and 54 of PatWing-5 and VP-33 of PatWing-3 supported Battleship Division 5, Cruiser Division 7, 40 destroyers and 15 submarines in conducting the Neutrality Patrol. VP-53 teamed up with VP-52 and a group of destroyers to cover the waters adjacent to Norfolk.

1 November 1939: VP-53 replaced its P2Y-3s with a mixed bag of spare PBY-1, 2 and 3 seaplanes from other squadrons for commencement of the Neutrality Patrols. There were not enough PBYs to replace all of the P2Ys, so two of the P2Y-3s were retained and flown alongside the PBYs.

February 1940: VP-53 was relocated to NAS Key West, Florida, remaining there until April 1941, when it returned to NAS Norfolk and exchanged its older model aircraft for the newer model PBY-5.

24 May 1941: VP-53 was relocated to NAS Quonset Point, Rhode Island, to await the completion of the base under construction at Argentia, Newfoundland. On 9 June 1941, a detachment of six aircraft deployed to NAS Argentia, supported by tender USS Albemarle. The detachment returned on 25 June, after VP-52 had moved ashore and assumed responsibility for patrols.

1 July 1941: VP-53 was redesignated VP-73 after the reorganization of the fleet patrol squadrons, and placed under PatWing-7, Support Force. Detachments of VP-71, 72, 73 and 74 began a rotation program to exchange deployed aircrews at NAS Argentia and Reykjavik back to their home ports at NAS Quonset Point and NAS Norfolk.

6 August 1941: Six aircraft of VP-73 and five PBMs of VP-74 arrived at Skerja Fjord, near Reykjavik. USS Goldsborough provided tender support to the squadrons operating out of Reykjavik. Convoys were covered up to 500 miles (800 km) from base and Anti-submarine warfare (ASW) coverage of the Denmark Strait between Iceland and Greenland was provided. The combined air strength of the British and U.S. forces in Iceland consisted of 48 British aircraft and 42 American planes. Crews operating in theextreme conditions of the Arctic Circle became known as "blue noses."

15 January 1942: Winter in Iceland was the worst enemy of the patrol squadrons. The British withdrew their PBY squadron, feeling that the weather was too extreme for operation of the slow patrol aircraft. On the 15th gales reaching 133 mph struck the area, sinking three of VP-73's Catalinas and two of VP-74's PBMs.

20 August 1942: While on convoy escort in Skerja Fjord, near Reykjavik, Lieutenant (jg) Robert B. Hopgood and crew attacked and sank U-464. Hopgood and his crew pressed home the attack even though the crew of the submarine elected to remain on the surface and fight it out with the lightly armed Catalina. HMS Castleton rescued 53 survivors. Returning to base, Hopgood sent the following message: "Sank Sub Open Club." Lieutenant (jg) Hopgood was awarded the Navy Cross for his heroic action.

28 August 1942: Lieutenant (jg) John E. Odell and crew claimed a U-boat kill while on convoy escort near Reykjavik. Postwar examination of German records does not indicate any losses on that date.

5 October 1942: Aircraft 73-P-12 of VP-73 attacked and sank U-582, while on convoy escort near Reykjavik.

25 October – November 1942: VP-73 was transferred to French Morocco, based at Craw Field, Port Lyautey. The squadron was operational by 11 November. During its operational patrols the squadron encountered Spanish Fiat CR.32 fighters over the Canary Islands and German Fw 200Cs near Gibraltar. Convoys were escorted by the southern route, earning crew members the sobriquet of "shellbacks" for crossing the Equator. During this period a detachment was maintained at Ben Sergao Field, Agadir. Crews at this location rotated with VP-92.

16 August 1943: VP-73 was relocated to Ben Sergao Field, Agadir, French Morocco.

4 December 1943: Orders were received relieving VP-73 of duty in French Morocco. The squadron arrived at NAS Norfolk on 25 December.

16 January 1944: After a brief home leave, the squadron was based at Floyd Bennett Field, New York. Convoys from England were provided coverage in the approaches to the eastern seaboard of the U.S., and ASW patrols were conducted off the coastline of the East Coast.

30 May 1945: VPB-73 deployed to NS San Juan, Puerto Rico. While assigned to NS San Juan the squadron came under the operational control of FAW-11, Caribbean Sea Frontier.

1 June 1945: VPB-73 deployed a three aircraft detachment to NAS Port Lyautey, French Morocco. A second detachment with one aircraft was sent to Guantanamo Bay Naval Base, Cuba.

November 1946: The squadron changed home ports from NS San Juan to NAS Norfolk.

1 September 1948: Following its redesignation from VPAM-4 to VP-34, the squadron began conversion training for the Martin PBM-5S at NAS Norfolk. The squadron's complement was nine PBMs, with 44 officers and 244 enlisted personnel.

15 December 1949: VP-34 conducted one week of cold weather exercises at NAS Halifax, Nova Scotia, supported by tender USS Duxbury Bay. VP-34 was the first seaplane squadron to operate from Halifax harbor.

VP-34 and VP-3 were the only two patrol squadrons to complete FY 1952 with 100 percent safety marks. VP-34 broke all previous records by flying 3,613 accident-free hours in just six months. In July 1953 Twelve VP-34 aircraft were employed in patrols and long-distance flights between NAS Trinidad and NAS Corpus Christi, Texas, for six weeks of training exercises.

NAS Coco Solo Panama Canal Zone was selected for reversion to caretaker status during the rounds of base cutbacks after the Korean War. VP-34 departed NAS Coco Solo on 30 June 1956 and returned to Norfolk for formal disestablishment.

== Aircraft assignments ==
The squadron was assigned the following aircraft, effective on the dates shown:

- Consolidated P3M-2 - September 1936
- P2Y-2 - October 1938
- P2Y-3 - April 1939
- Consolidated PBY Catalina - December 1939 initially with -1, -2, and -3 variants. Replaced with the improved PBY-5 variant in July 1941, the amphibious PBY-5A in 1942 and the PBY-6A in 1945
- Martin PBM-5A Mariner - September 1948, with PBM-5S from June 1949

== Home port assignments ==
The squadron was assigned to these home ports, effective on the dates shown:

- NAF Annapolis, Maryland - 1 September 1936
- NAS Norfolk, Virginia - October 1936
- NAS Key West, Florida - February 1940
- NAS Norfolk - April 1941
- NAS Quonset Point, Rhode Island - 24 May 1941
- NAS Port Lyautey, Morocco - 25 October 1942
- Ben Sergao Field, Agadir, Morocco - 16 August 1943
- NAS Norfolk - 25 December 1943
- NAS Floyd Bennett Field, New York - 16 January 1944
- NS San Juan, Puerto Rico - 30 May 1945
- NAS Norfolk - November 1946
- NAS Trinidad, British West Indies - October 1950
- NAS Coco Solo Panama Canal Zone - June 1955
- NAS Norfolk - June 1956

== See also ==
- Maritime patrol aircraft
- List of inactive United States Navy aircraft squadrons
- List of United States Navy aircraft squadrons
- List of squadrons in the Dictionary of American Naval Aviation Squadrons
- History of the United States Navy
