= Consolidated P2Y =

1929 maritime patrol flying boat by Consolidated Aircraft

P2Y
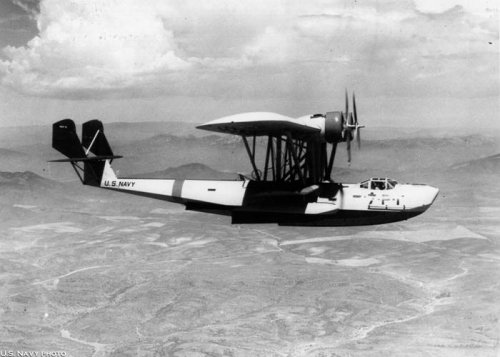
- Consolidated Model 22 (P2Y)

General information
- Type: Flying boat
- Manufacturer: Consolidated Aircraft
- Status: Retired
- Primary user: United States Navy
- Number built: 78

History
- First flight: 26 March 1932
- Retired: 1941

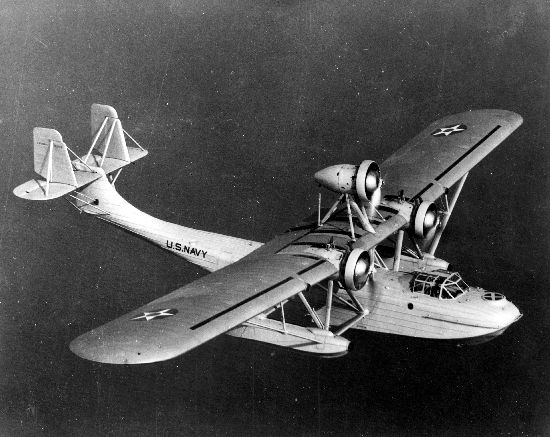
The Martin XP2M-1

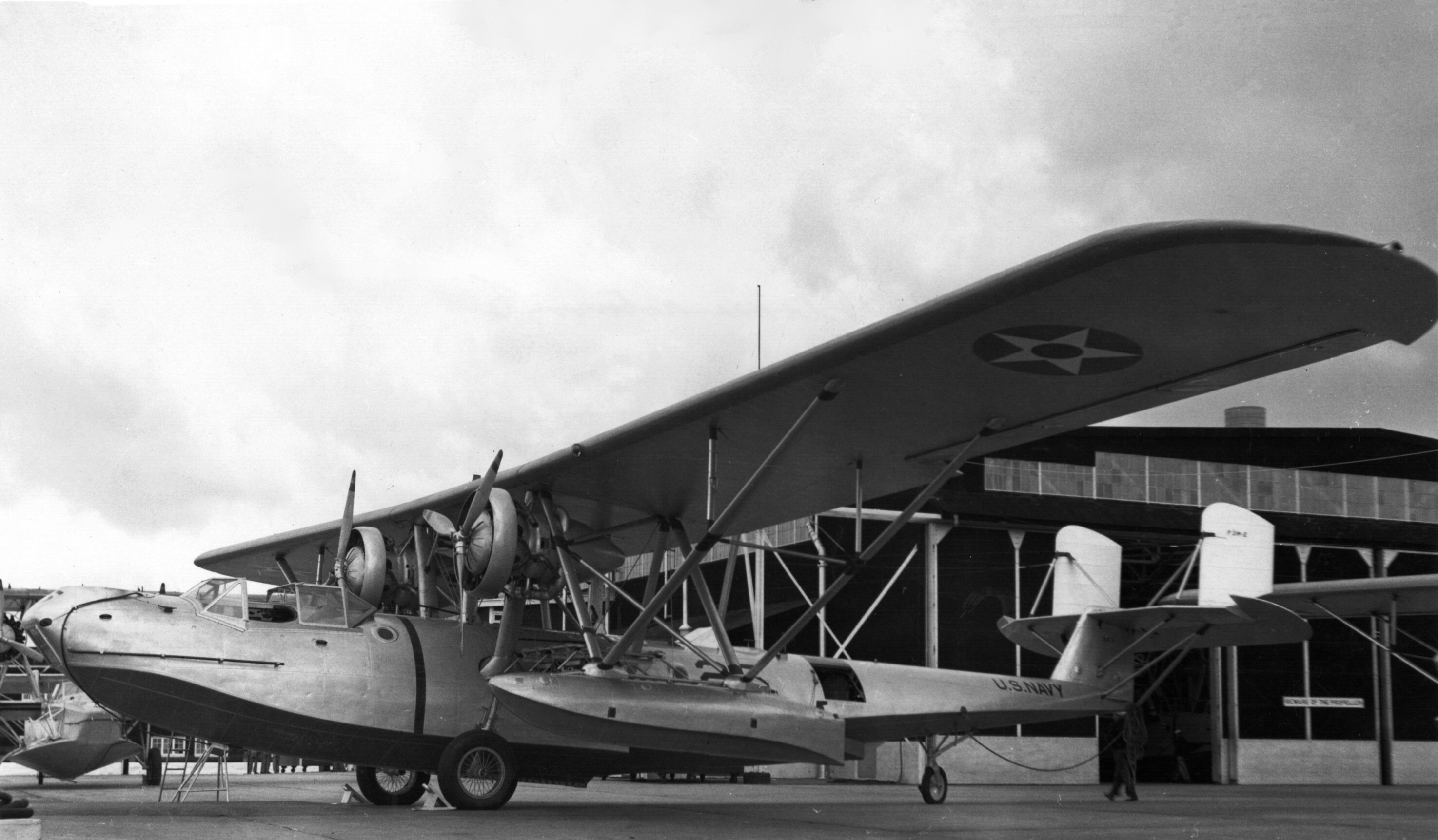
A Martin-built P3M-2 at NAS Pensacola

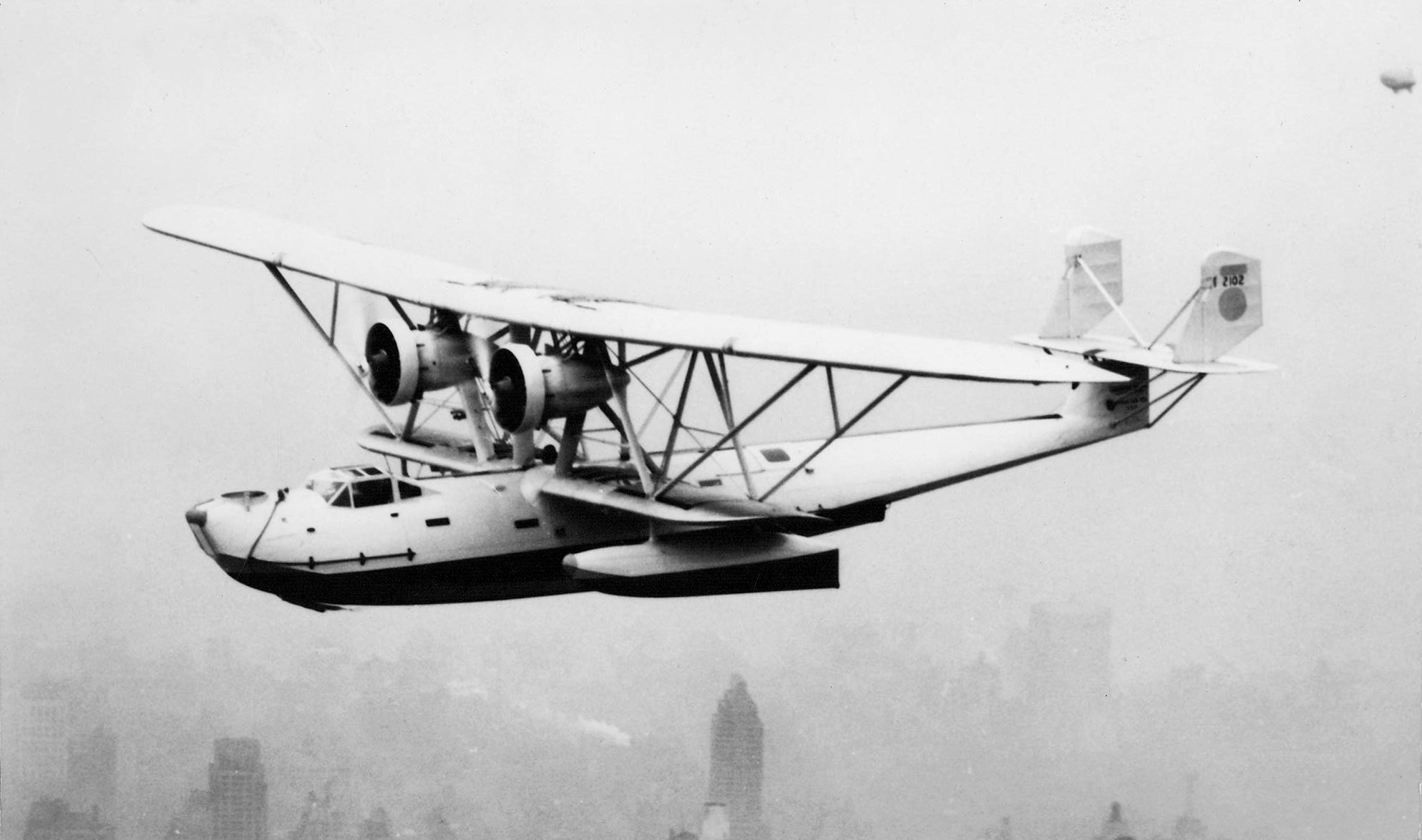
Consolidated flying boat produced for evaluation by Japan

The Consolidated P2Y was an American sesquiplane maritime patrol flying boat. The aircraft was also made by Martin as the P3M, as a parasol monoplane, due to the Navy awarding production contracts separately from prototype contracts.

== Development ==
Designed to meet a 28 February 1928 U.S. Navy contract, the prototype Model 9, XPY-1, a parasol monoplane, was designed by Isaac M. 'Mac' Laddon in accordance to the specifications laid out by Captain Holden C. "Dick" Richardson. Construction began in March 1928 and the aircraft was ready to fly by the end of 1928, and it made its first flight on 10 January 1929 at Anacostia NAS, Washington, D.C.

In standard Navy practice, production contracts were open to other bidders, and Martin underbid Consolidated and was awarded the contract to build them as the Martin P3M-1 and P3M-2. Three P3M-1s and six P3M-2s were built; one XP2M-1 was also built to a similar design, powered by three Wright Cyclone engines but following the removal of the third engine it was redesignated XP2M-2. The third engine on the XPY-1 had been studied and rejected by Navy Bureau of Aeronautics staff.

The Navy placed a new contract on 26 May 1931 for an improved version, designated the Model 22 Ranger by Consolidated. It incorporated features of the Model 16 Commodore, such as the enclosed cockpit, and was designated XP2Y-1 by the Navy. This new prototype had the same 100-foot (30 m) top wing, but became a sesquiplane with a smaller lower wing mounted to the top of the hull, replacing struts supporting the wingtip floats. Two Wright R-1820-E1 Cyclone engines were located on the underside of the top wing and had narrow-chord cowlings. A third similar engine was mounted on struts above the wing, but was removed after the first test in April 1932.

The Navy ordered 23 P2Y-3s as production models similar to the P2Y-2s that were modified from the original batch of P2Y-1s.

== Operational history ==
The Navy ordered 23 P2Y-1s on 7 July 1931. By mid-1933 they were serving with squadrons VP-10F and VP-5F, which made a number of long-range formation flights. At least 21 P2Y-1s were modified into P2Y-2s in 1936 and flown by VP-5F and VP-10F until 1938, when they were transferred to VP-14 and VP-15.

The first P2Y-3s reached VP-7F in 1935, and this version was flown by VP-4F at Pearl Harbor and in 1939 was in operation with VP-19, VP-20, and VP-21. By the end of 1941, all the P2Y-2s and P2Y-3s had been withdrawn from operational use and were at Naval Air Station Pensacola.

The Colombian Air Force used one Commodore P2Y as a bomber in the Colombia-Peru War in 1932–1933.

The Imperial Japanese Navy Air Service evaluated the Consolidated P2Y as the Consolidated Navy Experimental Type C Flying-Boat.

A P2Y-3 was used to test Curtiss electric propellers in 1936.

== Variants ==
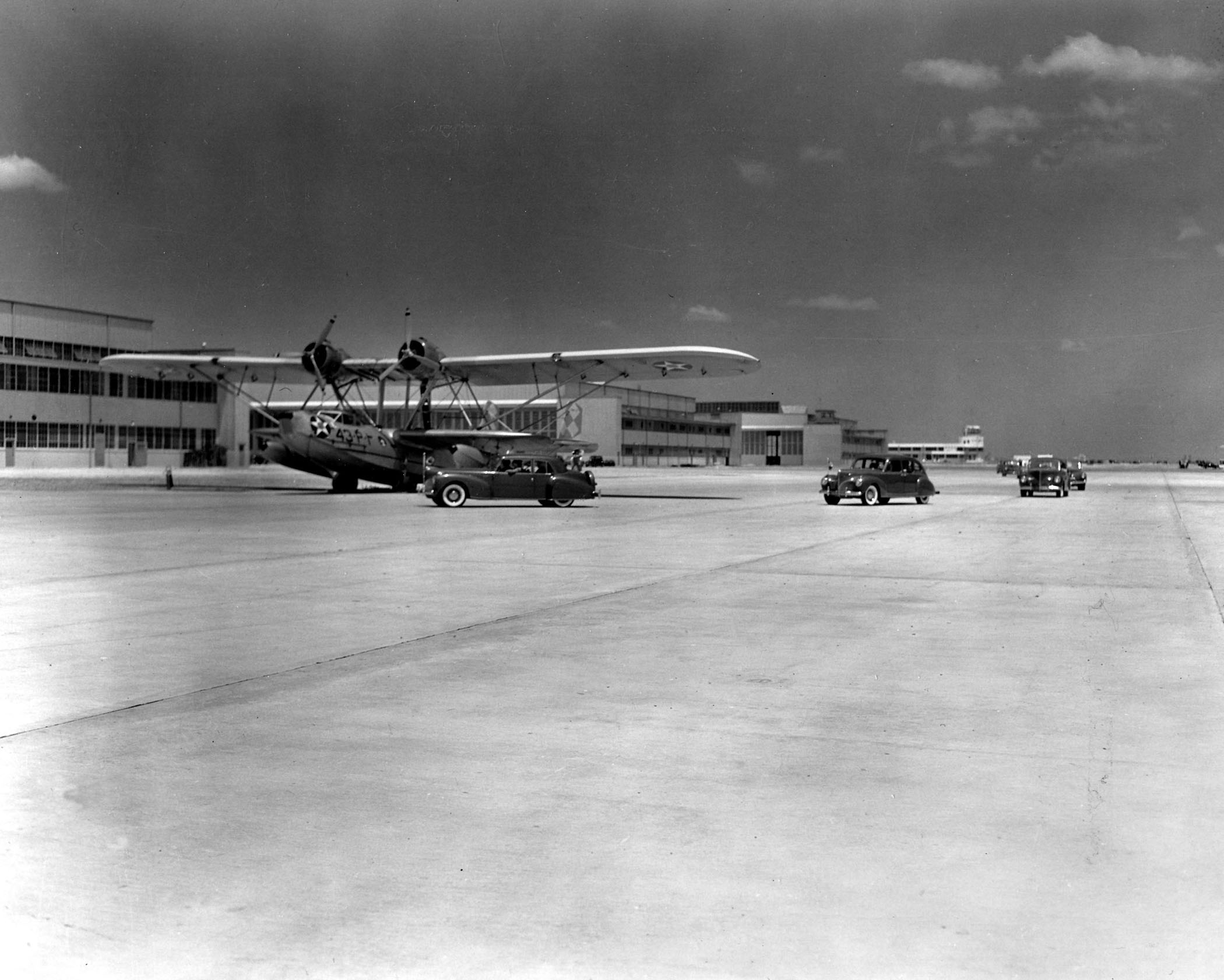
A P2Y-3 of VP-43 at NAS Jacksonville in 1941

XP2Y-1
One prototype
P2Y-1
Navy version of the Commodore. 23 were ordered on July 7, 1931, and were delivered to Patrol Squadron 10 (VP-10) at Norfolk, Virginia on February 1, 1933.
P2Y-1C
One aircraft delivered to Colombia in December 1932.
P2Y-1J
One aircraft delivered to Japan in January 1935.
XP2Y-2
One prototype
P2Y-2
More powerful R-1820-88 engines faired into the leading edges of the wing. Other -1s were converted in 1936
P2Y-3
Production version of the -2. 23 were ordered on 27 December 1933, which entered service with VP-7 in early 1935.
XP3M-1
One initial prototype built by the Glenn L. Martin Company with three Wright Cyclone engines.
P3M-1
Three production examples built by the Glenn L. Martin Company.
XP3M-2
XP3M-1 modified by removal of one engine.
P3M-2
Six production examples built by the Glenn L. Martin Company.
Consolidated Navy Experimental Type C Flying Boat.
The full designation of the P2Y evaluated by the Imperial Japanese Navy Air Service.
HXC
Short designation for the P2Y evaluated by the Imperial Japanese Navy Air service.

== Operators ==
Argentina

- Argentine Naval Aviation – six P2Y-3A, 1936–49

Colombia

- Colombian Air Force – one P2Y-1C

Japan

- Imperial Japanese Navy – one P2Y-1J as HXC

United States

- United States Navy

== Specifications (P2Y-3) ==
Data from The Complete Encyclopedia of World Aircraft; range from American Aircraft of World War II

General characteristics

- Crew: five
- Length: 61 ft 9 in (18.82 m)
- Wingspan: 100 ft 0 in (30.48 m)
- Height: 19 ft 1 in (5.82 m)
- Wing area: 1,514 sq ft (140.65 m^{2})
- Empty weight: 12,769 lb (5,792 kg)
- Gross weight: 25,266 lb (11,460 kg)
- Powerplant: 2 × Wright R-1820-90 Cyclone radial piston , 750 hp (559 kW) each

Performance

- Maximum speed: 149 mph (240 km/h, 129 kn)
- Cruise speed: 118 mph (189 km/h, 103 kn)
- Range: 1,180 mi (1,899 km, 1,030 nmi)
- Service ceiling: 16,100 ft (4,265 m)
- Rate of climb: 650 ft/min (3.3 m/s)

Armament

- Guns: 3 × flexible .30 cal (7.62 mm) M1919 Browning machine guns (one bow-mounted, two dorsal-mounted)
- Bombs: 2,000 lb (910 kg) bombload

== See also ==
- Boeing XPB

Related development

- Naval Aircraft Factory PN
- Consolidated Commodore
- Consolidated PBY Catalina

Aircraft of comparable role, configuration, and era

- Blackburn Sydney
- Latécoère 300

Related lists

- List of military aircraft of the United States
