= VP-40 =

Patrol Squadron 40
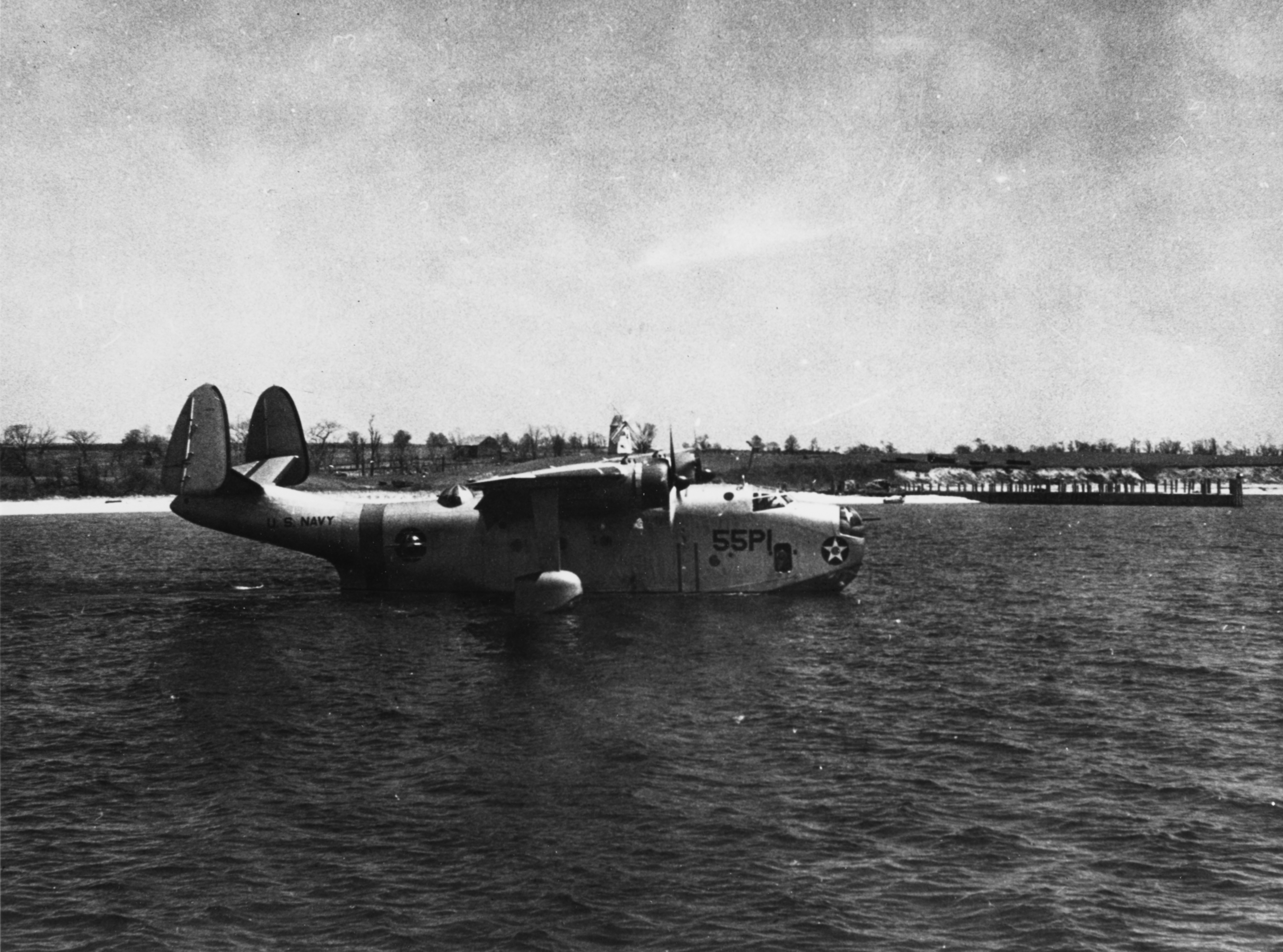
- VP-55 PBM-1 in 1941
- Active: 1 August 1940 – 25 January 1950
- Country: United States
- Branch: United States Navy
- Type: squadron
- Role: Maritime patrol
- Engagements: World War II

Aircraft flown
- Patrol: XPBM-1/PBM-1/3/3C/3S/5E

VP-40 was a Patrol Squadron of the U.S. Navy. The squadron was established as Patrol Squadron 55 (VP-55) on 1 August 1940, redesignated Patrol Squadron 74 (VP-74) on 1 July 1941, redesignated Patrol Bombing Squadron 74 (VPB-74) on 1 October 1944, redesignated Patrol Squadron 74 (VP-74) on 15 May 1946, redesignated Medium Patrol Squadron (Seaplane) 10 (VP-MS-10) on 15 November 1946, redesignated Patrol Squadron 40 (VP-40) on 1 September 1948 and disestablished on 25 January 1950.

== Operational history ==
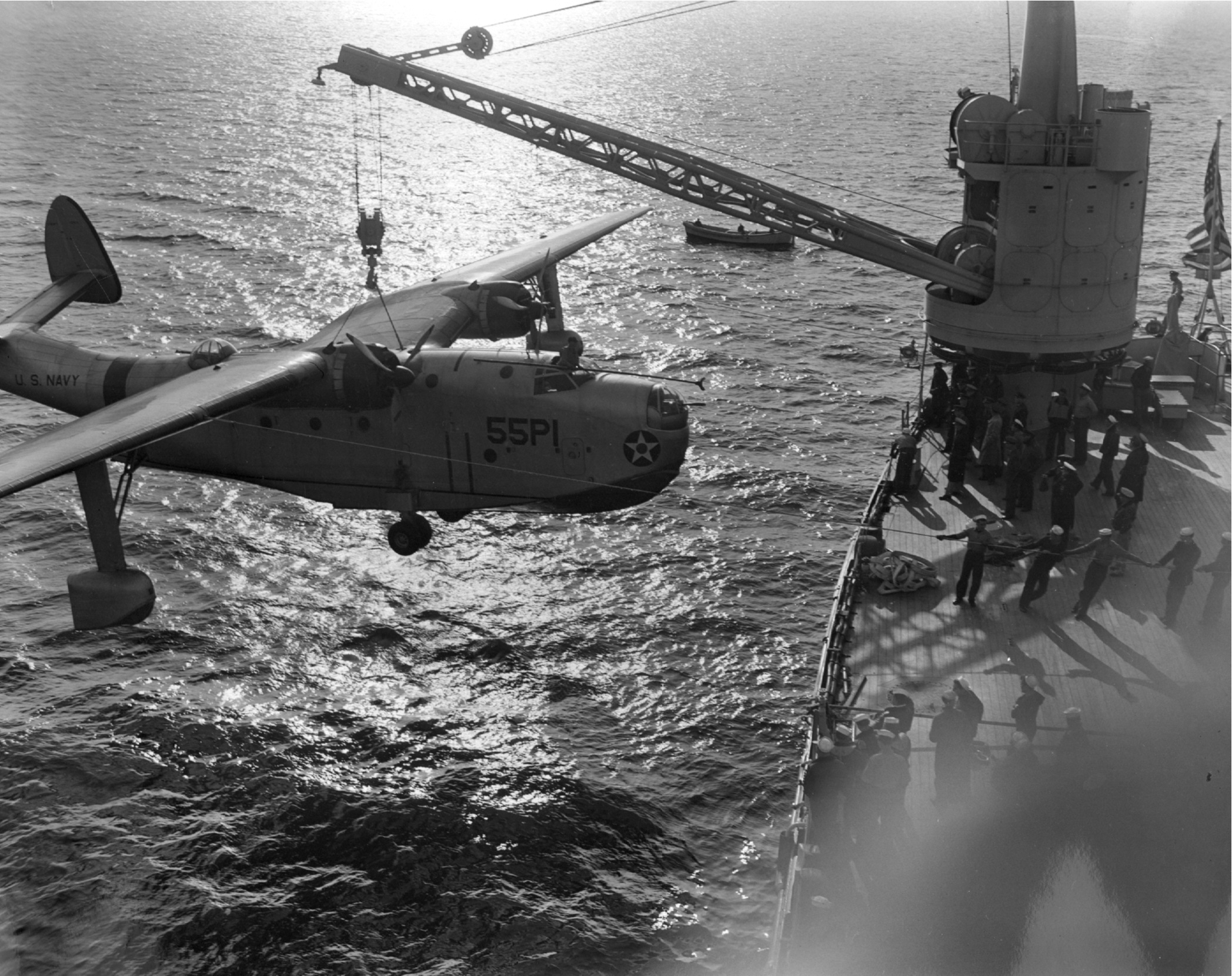
VP-55 PBM-1 being hoisted onto a tender in 1941

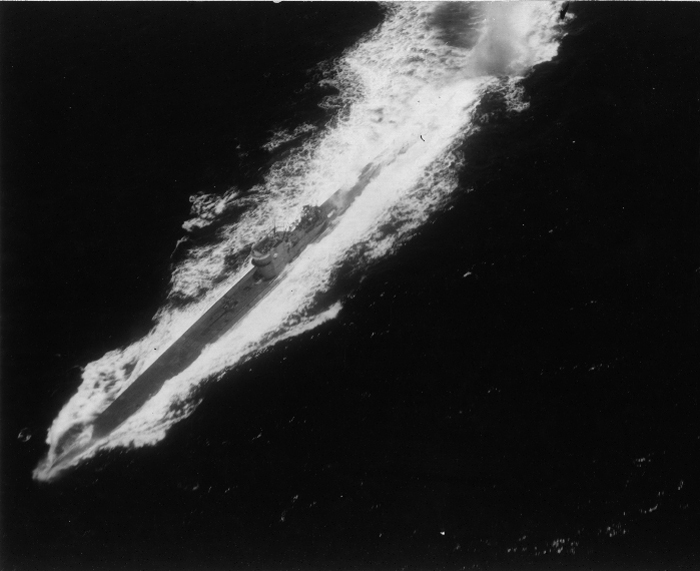
U-161 under attack by a VP-74 PBM on 27 September 1943

- 1 August 1940: VP-55 was established at NAS Norfolk, Virginia, under the administrative control of PatWing-5 as a seaplane patrol squadron destined for duty with the Neutrality Patrol. VP-55 and sister squadron VP-56 were ordered to provide aerial surveillance for the ships of the Support Force on the offshore patrol. The first aircraft flown by the squadron was an XPBM-1, the pre-production version of the Martin Mariner. Training on this aircraft was undertaken at the Glenn L. Martin plant in Baltimore, Martyand, from 1 September through early October 1940. Engineering personnel were sent to the Wright engine plant for instruction. By the end of January 1941 the squadron’s full complement of 12 PBM-1 aircraft had been delivered.
- 1 February 1941: A six-aircraft detachment was sent to NAS Jacksonville, Florida for training. The six remaining aircraft at NAS Norfolk continued training and participated in the Neutrality Patrol.
- 1 March – 5 April 1941: The destroyer units and Patrol Wing of Support Force (Neutrality Patrol) were reorganized as elements of Support Force, U.S. Atlantic Fleet under command of Rear Admiral Arthur L. Bristol, designated Task Force 4. The Patrol Wing of Task Force 4 consisted of Patrol Squadrons 51, 52, 55 and 56, with tender support provided by USS Albemarle and USS George E. Badger. On 5 April 1941, VP-53 joined Support Force. The original offshore patrol was extended to include a northern patrol to strategic islands in the north and east to help ensure the safe passage of war materials to Britain.
- 1 May 1941: VP-55 flew to Gardiners Bay, New York, for 10 days of exercises with USS Albemarle. On the conclusion of the exercises, Albemarle proceeded on to NAS Argentia, Newfoundland. The squadron returned to NAS Norfolk.
- 1 July 1941: Patrol Wing, Support Force became Patrol Wing 7, remaining a patrol wing of Support Force. Patrol Squadrons 51, 52, 53 and 55 became Patrol Squadrons 71, 72, 73 and 74, respectively.
- 19 July 1941: A three-aircraft detachment was sent to NAS Argentia, based aboard USS Albemarle and USS Pocomoke.
- 12 August 1941 – January 1942: Six aircraft were dispatched to Reykjavik, Iceland, aboard USS Goldsborough. The VP-74 detachment operated from Skerja Fjord conducting convoy coverage patrols out 500 miles (800 km) from base and air patrols from the Denmark Strait to Greenland. The aircraft carried no bombs, but merely reported submarine contacts. That system was abandoned after 15 October 1941 when a new destroyer, USS Kearney, was torpedoed near Iceland, from then on, it was "Sink on Sight." On 15 January 1942, two of the Reykjavik detachment aircraft were sunk at their moorings during a storm.
- 2 January – September 1942: The squadron’s Argentia detachment was relieved by VP-82 for return to NAS Norfolk. These aircraft, plus three from the Norfolk detachment, were assigned to duty at Bermuda, based on Darrell's Island, Bermuda, tended by USS Gannett. The detachment moved to NAS King’s Point on 1 May 1942, remaining until September conducting Anti-submarine warfare (ASW) patrols and air-sea rescue.
- 3 June 1942: Ensign John Cushman and his entire crew were lost at sea during a mission off Bermuda.
- 30 June 1942: Plane #1, flown by Lieutenant Richard E. Schreder, was credited with sinking U-158. The submarine was spotted by the crew during a ferry flight.
- September 1942: The entire squadron was relocated to NAS Norfolk, with a two-aircraft detachment at NS San Juan, Puerto Rico. During this brief refit period, the squadron’s original PBM-1 seaplanes were traded in for newer PBM-3s. After refit, eight squadron aircraft departed Norfolk on 22 September 1942, NAS Trinidad, British West Indies. Upon arrival the squadron began ASW patrols and rescue work. During this assignment VP-74 came under the operational control of PatWing-11.
- 18 December 1942: Orders were received transferring the squadron to NAF Natal, Brazil. Upon arrival, USS Humboldt provided tender service, while the squadron conducted ASW patrols and air-sea rescue missions.
- 16 February 1943: The squadron at NAF Natal received new PBM-3Cs.
- 24 February 1943: The squadron experienced its first encounter with the new German U-boat tactic of remaining on the surface to fight. Ensign W. J. Barnard sighted a U-boat torpedoing a ship. During his attack run against the submarine it surfaced and returned unusually heavy and accurate anti-aircraft (AA) fire. Ensign Barnard and his crew escaped injury, but lost track of the submarine on the return run. By this point in the war the German U-boats were being equipped with quad-mount 20-mm AA guns and presented a special hazard to aircrews pressing an attack when the element of surprise had been lost. Lieutenant Carey, Plane #6, was shot down in this manner in July 1943.
- 20 March 1943: A three-aircraft detachment was established at NAF Aratu, Bahia, Brazil.
- 28 April 1943: Ten of the squadron’s PBM-3Cs were sent to NAF Aratu, while one remained at NAF Natal.
- 17 May 1943: Planes #5 and #6, piloted by Lieutenants Howland Davis and Carey, respectively, shared credit with USS Moffett and USS Jouett for the sinking of U-128.
- 25 June 1943: A two-aircraft detachment was established at NAF Galeão, Rio de Janeiro, Brazil.
- 19 July 1943: Plane #5, piloted by Lieutenant (jg) Roy S. Whitcomb, was credited with sinking U-513. The captain of the U-boat had elected to remain on the surface and fight it out with his AA batteries.
- 31 Jul 1943: Plane #7, piloted by Lieutenant W. F. Smith, shared honors with a Brazilian PBY in sinking U-199.
- 27 September 1943: Plane #2, piloted by Lieutenant (jg) Harry B. Patterson, was credited with sinking U-161, two crew members were wounded in the attack by return fire from the U-boat.
- 16 October 1943: VP-74 was relieved at NAF Aratu, Brazil, by VPB-211.
- 2 November 1943: The squadron returned to the US and had detachments assigned to NAS Norfolk, with two PBM-3Cs and 1 PBM-3S and nine PBM-3Ss at NAS Floyd Bennett Field, New York.
- 14 December 1943 – March 1944: The entire squadron was reassigned to NAS Elizabeth City, North Carolina, for ASW patrols and coverage of convoy routes. From 8 January to March 1944, the squadron maintained a three-aircraft detachment at NAS Norfolk.
- 15 December 1944: A three-aircraft detachment was sent to NAS Coco Solo, Panama Canal Zone, for convoy and ASW operations under FAW-3. The detachment was augmented on 2 January 1945 by three additional aircraft.
- 24–28 January 1945: VPB-74 was transferred to NAS Coco Solo, joining the six-aircraft detachment already stationed at that location. On 28 January 1945, VPB-74 was officially put under the operational control of FAW-3.
- 1–28 February 1945: The squadron relocated to NAF Seymour Island, Galapagos, with a three-aircraft detachment at Corinto, Nicaragua. On 28 February 1945, an additional four-aircraft detachment began operations at Tangus Cove, Galapagos, based aboard USS Albemarle.
- 4 April 1945: VPB-74 was relieved for return to home port NAS Norfolk, under the operational control of FAW-9. Shortly thereafter, the squadron was refitted with new PBM-5E Mariners.
- 28 May 1945: A three-aircraft detachment of VPB-74 returned to the Canal Zone for duty under FAW-3 at NAF Seymour Island, aboard USS Barnegat. The last detachment arrived by 4 June 1945.
- 15 September 1945: After the Surrender of Japan on 2 September 1945, the squadron mission was changed to the peacetime job of guarding the Panama Canal. The administrative elements of the squadron were transferred to NAS Coco Solo on 15 September 1945. Over the next four years, a rotating three-aircraft detachment was maintained at NAS Guantanamo, Cuba, for air-sea rescue missions.
- October 1945: The squadron’s aircraft were replaced by new PBM-5s.
- 9 January 1950: VP-40 was relieved for return to NAS Norfolk where it was formally disestablished on 25 January 1950.

== Aircraft assignments ==
The squadron was assigned the following aircraft, effective on the dates shown:

- XPBM-1 - September 1940
- PBM-1 - January 1941
- PBM-3 - September 1942
- PBM-3C - February 1943
- PBM-3S - June 1943
- PBM-5E - April 1945

== Home port assignments ==
The squadron was assigned to these home ports, effective on the dates shown:

- NAS Norfolk, Virginia - 1 August 1940
- NAS Trinidad, British West Indies - 22 September 1942
- NAF Natal, Brazil - 18 December 1942
- NAS Norfolk - November 1943
- NAS Elizabeth City, North Carolina - 14 December 1943
- NAS Coco Solo, Panama Canal Zone - 24 January 1945
- NAF Seymour Island, Galapagos - 1 February 1945
- NAS Norfolk - 4 April 1945
- NAS Coco Solo - 15 September 1945
- NAS Norfolk - 9 January 1950

== See also ==
- Maritime patrol aircraft
- List of inactive United States Navy aircraft squadrons
- List of United States Navy aircraft squadrons
- List of squadrons in the Dictionary of American Naval Aviation Squadrons
- History of the United States Navy
