= VPB-33 =

Patrol Bombing Squadron 33
- Active: 1 April 1942 – 7 April 1945
- Country: United States of America
- Branch: United States Navy
- Type: squadron
- Role: Maritime patrol
- Nickname(s): Black Cats
- Engagements: World War II

Aircraft flown
- Patrol: PBY-5A

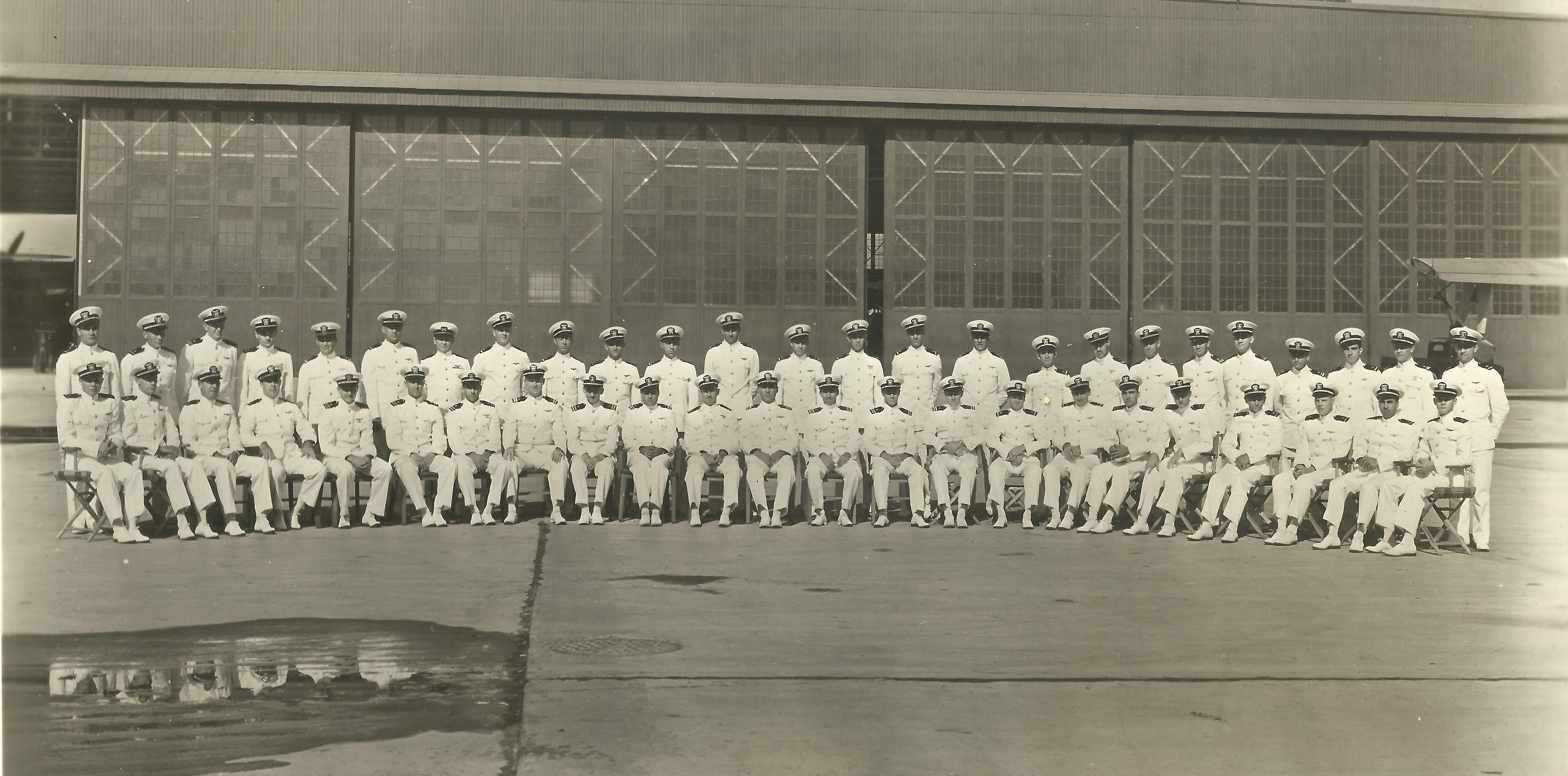
VP-33, prior to deployment to Panama in 1942.

VPB-33 was a Patrol Bombing Squadron of the U.S. Navy. The squadron was established as Patrol Squadron 33 (VP-33) on 1 April 1942, redesignated Patrol Bombing Squadron 33 (VPB-33) on 1 October 1944 and disestablished on 7 April 1945.

Squadron Insignia and nickname:

The first squadron insignia was a design originally approved for use by VP-5S. It consisted of a conventional pair of Naval Aviation wings superimposed on a silhouette of the Western Hemisphere and symmetrically contained in a compass rose. Colors: geographical areas, dark blue; wings, conventional gold; compass rose, red with blue inner ring and black line outer circle. The insignia was frequently referred to as "Wings Over Panama," in deference to the squadron's home base in the Panama Canal Zone during the first period of its existence. This design was not officially approved for VP-33 because it was still in use by the former VP-5S that had gone through numerous redesignations since 1931 and was known as VP-32 and VPB-32 during World War II. It is one of the few instances known where the same design was in use by two active squadrons at the same time.

VP-33 was destined to become one of ten well-known Black Cat squadrons operating in the South Pacific during WWII. After reaching the combat zone and being assigned its unique mission, the squadron submitted a new design to CNO. This insignia was approved on 17 April 1944. The black cat, the central character of the design, was shown armed with a telescope and depth charge and superimposed on an enlarged cat's eye. Colors: background, black; eye, orange and lemon yellow; cat, black with yellow outlines; eyeball, yellow; pupil, green; telescope, blue and white; depth charge, light blue with black markings.

This insignia was used by the squadron until its disestablishment in 1945.

Nickname: Black Cats, 1943–1945.

== Operational history ==
- 1 April – July 1942: VP-33 was established at NAS Norfolk, Virginia, under the operational control of FAW-5, as a seaplane squadron flying the PBY-5A Catalina. Squadron training was conducted at NAS Quonset Point, Rhode Island, until mid-July.
- 9 July 1942: VP-52 was withdrawn from NAS Coco Solo, Panama Canal Zone, and replaced by VP-33. During this period the squadron came under the operational control of FAW-3 and was assigned duties of patrolling convoy routes, Anti-submarine warfare (ASW) patrols and ferrying supplies to advanced bases in the Caribbean.
- 10 July 1943: VP-33 was relieved at NAS Coco Solo for return to NAS Corpus Christi, Texas and 15 days home leave with orders to report to NAS San Diego, California.
- 15 Aug 1943: After a brief two-week period of refit with new aircraft and equipment, the squadron departed NAS San Diego, for a trans-Pacific flight to NAS Kaneohe Bay, Hawaii. Upon arrival the squadron came under the operational control of FAW-2 and quickly deployed to Kanton Island. VP-33 conducted day searches toward the Gilbert Islands covering the occupation of Baker Island.
- 26 September 1943: VP-33 was relocated to Funafuti, conducting day searches toward Tarawa.
- 26 October 1943: VP-33 moved to Perth, Australia, under the operational control of FAW-10. The squadron conducted day searches and night bombing (Black Cat) missions to Koepang and Amboina.
- 15 February 1944: VP-33 was relocated to Samarai, New Guinea, under the operational control of FAW-17. The squadron was assigned night search patrols and attack missions against enemy shipping in the Bismarck Sea.
- 25 March 1944: VP-33 was relocated to Manus Island, in the Admiralty Island chain. There it conducted daylight searches toward Truk and Woleai; bombing missions against Woleai and Wakde; air-sea rescue missions around Truk, Woleai and Yap; and coverage for the invasion of Hollandia.
- 19 May 1944: After the occupation of Hollandia, the squadron moved aboard USS Heron in Humboldt Bay. With VP-52, the squadron conducted air-sea rescue for Army strikes on Wewak, Wakde, Biak, Noemfoor, Manokwari, Babo, Jefman and Sagan.
- 17 July 1944: VP-33 was relocated to Manus to conduct daylight searches and air-sea rescue missions for downed aircrews.
- 1 September 1944: VP-33 moved to Middleburg Island to conduct night search and attack missions against enemy shipping in the Netherlands East Indies and southern Philippine islands area.
- 19 September 1944: The squadron was relocated to Morotai with no change in its assigned missions.
- 26 September 1944: Lieutenant James F. Merritt Jr. led his Catalina in an attack against two enemy transports and their five armed escorts. The attack was conducted off the southwest coast of Mindanao, Philippines, in hazardous night conditions of bright moonlight and heavy concentrations of antiaircraft (AA) fire from the armed escort ships. During his mast head bombing attack his bombs failed to release. He returned, despite the heavy AA fire, and made a successful attack resulting in probable damage to one large transport and the destruction of the other transport. For his actions he was awarded the Navy Cross.
- 3 October 1944: While patrolling Toli Toli Bay, Northern Celebes, on a Black Cat mission the night of 3 October, Lieutenant (jg) William B. Sumpter led his crew in an attack against a Katori-class cruiser. His attack was made during the hazardous conditions of bright moonlight and against constant and intense antiaircraft fire from the cruiser. He scored eight bomb hits resulting in explosions and the burning of the cruiser and its sinking. For his actions he was awarded the Navy Cross.
- 23 October 1944: VPB-33 was relocated to Leyte to conduct daylight searches for the enemy in the Philippine Sea. The squadron at this time came under the operational control of FAW-10.
- 1 December 1944: A detachment of four aircraft remained under FAW-10 at Woendi Lagoon. The remainder of the squadron relocated to Los Negros under FAW-17. This group with seven aircraft operated from Emirau and the Green and Treasury islands to conduct ASW patrols and air-sea rescue missions.
- 20 December 1944: The Woendi detachment returned to Leyte aboard the tender USS San Carlos. There they were reunited with the rest of the squadron on 10 January 1945, with additional support from USS Tangier. Anti-shipping patrols and Dumbo missions were the order of the day.
- 4 February – March 1945: VPB-33 was relieved for return to the U.S. The squadron flew to Los Negros Island and boarded HMS Tracker on 27 February for return to San Diego. Upon arrival on 19 March the squadron was assigned temporary quarters and given leave on the 24th.
- 10 April 1945: VPB-33 was disestablished.

== Aircraft assignments ==
The squadron was assigned the following aircraft, effective on the dates shown:

- PBY-5A - 1 April 1942

== Home port assignments ==
The squadron was assigned to these home ports, effective on the dates shown:

- NAS Quonset Point, Rhode Island - 1 April 1942
- NAS Coco Solo, Panama Canal Zone - 9 July 1942
- NAS San Diego, California - July 1943
- NAS Kaneohe Bay, Hawaii - 15 August 1943
- NAS San Diego - 19 March 1945

== Commanding Officers ==
Name - Date Assumed Command

LCDR H. D. Hale - 1 Apr 1942

LCDR R. C. Bengston - 22 Dec 1942

LCDR F. P. Anderson - 15 Aug 1943

== See also ==
- Maritime patrol aircraft
- List of inactive United States Navy aircraft squadrons
- List of United States Navy aircraft squadrons
- List of squadrons in the Dictionary of American Naval Aviation Squadrons
- History of the United States Navy
