= USS Owl (AM-2) =

Minesweeper of the United States Navy

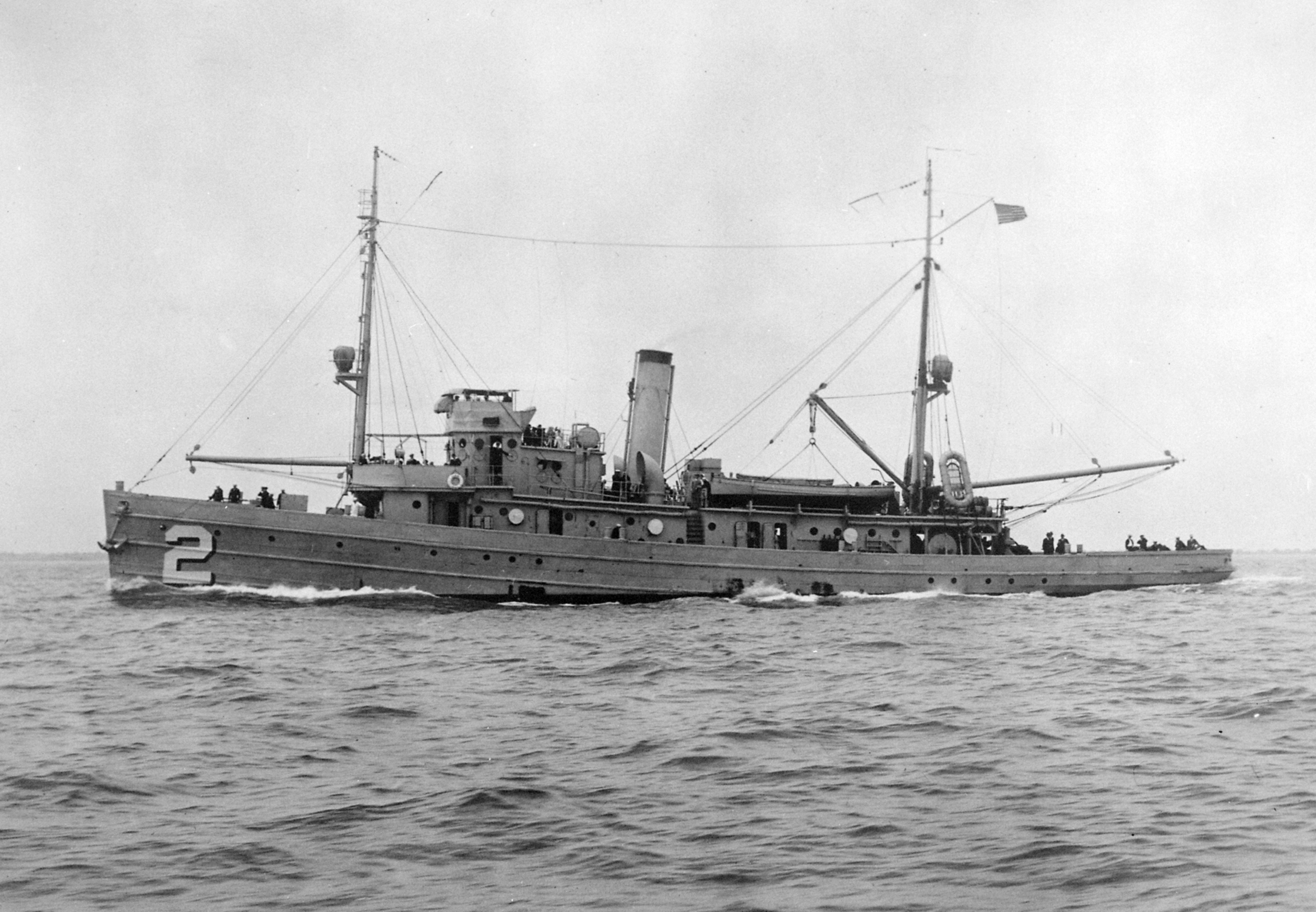
- USS Owl (AM-2) underway in 1927

History

United States
- Name: USS Owl
- Builder: Todd Shipyard Co., New York
- Laid down: 25 October 1917
- Launched: 4 March 1918
- Commissioned: 11 July 1918
- Decommissioned: 26 July 1946
- Reclassified: AT-137, 1 June 1942; ATO-137, 15 May 1944
- Honours and awards: 1 battle star (World War II)
- Fate: Sold for scrap, 27 June 1947

General characteristics
- Class & type: Lapwing-class minesweeper
- Displacement: 1,009 long tons (1,025 t) full
- Length: 187 ft 10 in (57.25 m)
- Beam: 35 ft 6 in (10.82 m)
- Draft: 10 ft 4 in (3.15 m)
- Speed: 14 knots (26 km/h; 16 mph)
- Complement: 78
- Armament: 2 × 3 in (76 mm) guns

USS Owl (AM-2) was an Lapwing-class minesweeper acquired by the U.S. Navy for the dangerous task of removing mines from minefields laid in the water to prevent ships from passing.

The first Owl to be so named by the Navy, AM-2 was laid down 25 October 1917 by the Todd Shipbuilding Corp., Brooklyn, New York; launched 4 March 1918; sponsored by Miss Ruth R. Dodd; and commissioned 11 July 1918.

== World War I Atlantic operations ==
Following a New York to Charleston, South Carolina towing assignment, Owl reported to the 5th Naval District at Norfolk, Virginia, 22 August 1918. Employed as a minesweeper for the remaining months of World War I, she then served as a light ship in the inner approach to Chesapeake Bay until 10 July 1919. From that time until 1936, she was primarily engaged in providing towing services along the eastern seaboard and in the Caribbean. Between June 1936 and January 1941, she operated with units of the Aircraft Division, Base Force, providing planeguard, seaplane tender, and target and mooring buoy planting services from New England to the Caribbean.

Then, temporarily attached to Train, Patrol Force at Culebra, Puerto Rico, she steamed to Bermuda in May for towing and servicing duties with MinDiv 14. Redesignated as Ocean Tug AT–137 on 1 June 1942, she was based at Bermuda until June 1943. During that time, towing and escort duties frequently took her to the east coast, while numerous salvage and rescue missions, including aid to the submarine USS R-1 and torpedoed Argentine tanker Victoria, kept her busy at Bermuda and in nearby convoy lanes.

== Preparing for the invasion of France ==
Detached from Bermudan duty in June, Owl spent the last six months of 1943 with DesRon 30 operating out of Guantánamo Bay, Cuba. She then steamed back to Norfolk, Virginia, for overhaul, and sailed for Europe. She arrived at Falmouth, Cornwall, United Kingdom, 14 March 1944 to join the Allied forces gathering for the invasion of France. Redesignated ATO–137 on 15 May 1944, she arrived off the Normandy coast two days after "D-Day." As ground forces pushed inland, she towed port and road construction materials to the French coast, thus aiding the all-important flow of men and equipment to the front. Availability at Falmouth, early in the new year, 1945, preceded her return to the United States, 27 February, and mid-Atlantic coast towing assignments.

== Transfer to Pacific operations ==
Transferred to the U.S. Pacific Fleet, she sailed from Newport, Rhode Island, 5 May, with the Gate Craft YNG–11 in tow, and arrived at San Diego, 23 June, to join ServRon 2. In August she continued on to Pearl Harbor for four months of target towing duty, returning to the west coast 2 January 1946. Owl then provided towing services for the 19th Fleet (Reserve Fleet) until beginning inactivation in April.

== Decommissioning ==
She decommissioned in the 13th Naval District on 26 July 1946, and on 27 June 1947 was sold for scrapping to the Pacific Metal and Salvage Co. at Port of Nordland, Washington.

== Awards ==
Owl received 1 battle star for World War II service.
