= VP-29 =

Patrol Squadron 29
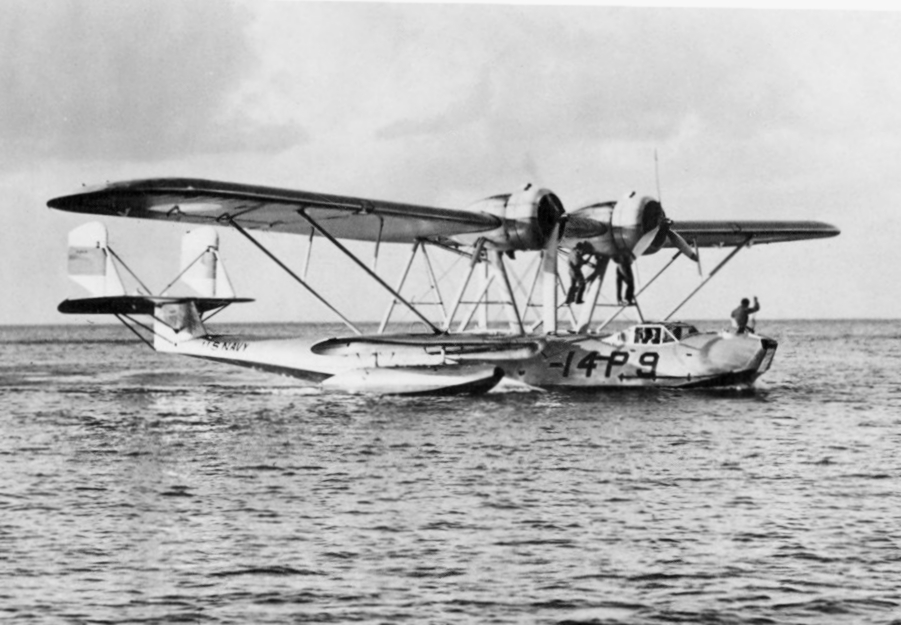
- VP-14 P2Y-2 c.1939
- Active: 1 November 1935 – 18 January 1950
- Country: United States of America
- Branch: United States Navy
- Type: squadron
- Role: Maritime patrol
- Engagements: World War II

Aircraft flown
- Patrol: PM-2; P2Y-2; PBY-5/5A; PB4Y-2

VP-29 was a Patrol Squadron of the U.S. Navy. The squadron was established as Patrol Squadron 14-F (VP-14F) on 1 November 1935, redesignated Patrol Squadron 14 (VP-14) on 4 September 1937, redesignated Patrol Squadron 52 (VP-52) on 1 July 1939, redesignated Patrol Squadron 72 (VP-72) on 1 July 1941, redesignated Patrol Bombing Squadron 122 (VPB-122) on 1 October 1944, redesignated Patrol Squadron 122 (VP-122) on 15 May 1946, redesignated Heavy Patrol Squadron (Landplane) 12 (VP-HL-12) on 15 November 1946, redesignated Patrol Squadron 29 (VP-29) on 1 September 1948 and disestablished on 18 January 1950.

== Operational history ==
- 1 Nov 1935: VP-14F was established at NAS Norfolk, Virginia. The squadron flew a complement of six PM-2 flying boats, with tender support provided by USS Owl.
- 1 March 1938: VP-14 participated in Fleet Landing Exercise No. 4, visiting ports at Miami, Florida, Guantanamo Bay Naval Base, Cuba, Port Padre, San Juan, Puerto Rico and Saint Thomas, U.S. Virgin Islands.
- June 1938: VP-14 received 11 P2Y-2s from VP-10 when that squadron received its new PBY-1 Catalinas. The squadron aircraft allowance was subsequently raised from 6 to 12, although only 11 aircraft were ever in the inventory.
- 5 September 1939: President Franklin D. Roosevelt issued his proclamation of neutrality, paving the way for the establishment of the Neutrality Patrol. By 20 September 1939, the Neutrality Patrol was in effect; VP-52 teamed with VP-53 and a group of destroyers to protect the approaches to Norfolk.
- 1 October 1939: VP-52 was relocated to NS Charleston, South Carolina, to fill gaps in the coverage of the southern Atlantic coastline.
- August – October 1940: VP-52 operated from advanced bases at Parris Island and Winyah Bay, South Carolina, with tender support by USS Owl and USS Thrush.
- December 1940 – January 1941: VP-52 exchanged its well-worn P2Y-2 aircraft, the last still in operation in the fleet, for new PBY-5s. The P2Y-2s were flown from Charleston to NAS Pensacola, Florida, for use as training planes. The PBY-5 aircraft were ferried across country by VP-14 from NAS San Diego, California, and delivered to VP- 52 in Pensacola in January. While en route, aircraft 14-P-11 flown by Lieutenant (jg) Murray Hanson, met foul weather and made an emergency landing on a dry lake on King Ranch, Texas. The lake had only three inches of water over the mud bottom, but a successful landing was made without damage to the aircraft. After removal of gear and partial refueling, Hanson was able to make an equally successful takeoff to complete the delivery of the new Catalina.
- 1 January 1941: VP-52 relocated from NS Charleston to NAS Norfolk
- 1 February 1941: VP-52 joined VP-51 at the unfinished Naval Air Station at San Juan, Puerto Rico. Crews were forced to live in tents next to the civilian airport until the barracks were completed. The two squadrons shared Neutrality Patrol duties through the Caribbean from the West Indies to Trinidad.
- 1 March – 5 April 1941: VP-52 held a change of command at NAS Norfolk and, on the same date, Rear Admiral Arthur L. Bristol assumed command of Support Force, U.S. Atlantic Fleet with responsibility for the Neutrality Patrol in the North Atlantic. Aviation assets in the new command consisted of VPs 51, 52, 55, and 56; and tenders USS Albemarle and USS George E. Badger. VP-53 joined the Support Force on 5 April 1941.
- 5 May 1941: VP-52 and VP-53 were relocated to NAS Quonset Point, Rhode Island to further improve coverage in the Northern Atlantic sea lanes and better protect passage of war material to Britain.
- 15 May 1941: VP-52 deployed to NAS Argentia, Newfoundland, recently obtained from Britain in the Destroyers for Bases Agreement. The squadron operated 10 PBY-5s from this location, with a detachment of two aircraft at NAS Norfolk. This remained the forward U.S. base until July 1943, when operations were moved to locations in the United Kingdom. The Norfolk detachment rejoined the squadron at Argentia on 25 June 1941.
- 24 May 1941: all VP-52 aircraft were launched in the face of strong gales to search for the German battleship Bismarck, which had just engaged and sunk HMS Hood in the Strait of Denmark. The ship was not spotted, as it had turned south of the patrol area. Of the 11 aircraft aloft, none were able to return to NAS Argentia due to bad weather at the landing site, but all ll ultimately returned to base.
- 29 May 1941: VP-52 deployed four aircraft to Iceland, based on USS Belknap at Reykjavík. The planes surveyed the east coast of Greenland where Danish weather stations were suspected of being in use by the Germans for relaying forecasts to the U-boat wolfpacks. Inspections of the facilities showed them to be abandoned, and the detachment returned to NAS Argentia on 8 June 1941.
- 1 Jul 1941: The Support Force was reorganized on this date to become Patrol Wing 7, and its squadrons 51, 52, 53 and 55 became VPs 71, 72, 73, and 74 respectively.
- 3 July 1941: Four new PBY-5 aircraft recently received by the squadron departed NAS Argentia for Reykjavík. One was lost en route with no trace of aircraft or crew ever located. The remaining three returned to NAS Argentia on 7 July 1941.
- 9 December 1941: A few days after the Attack on Pearl Harbor, VP-72 was one of the East Coast squadrons given orders to fly cross country to NAS Alameda, California, to prepare for trans-Pacific flight to Hawaii.
- 21–23 December 1941: Seven squadron aircraft departed NAS Alameda on the 21st, arriving at NAS Kaneohe Bay, Hawaii, on 23 December 1941. The three remaining aircraft of VP-72 departed NAS Alameda later in the day with eight aircraft of VP-71. Two of the three went down at sea en route. The crews were quickly rescued and one aircraft was salvaged, but the other sank.
- 24 December 1941: Three squadron aircraft were put on patrol operating out of NAS Kaneohe Bay flying 700 miles (1,100 km) patrol sectors of 11 to 12 hours duration. A detachment of two other aircraft flew to Johnston Island.
- 31 January 1942: Two more squadron aircraft left behind at NAS Alameda, completed the trans-Pacific flight rejoining the squadron at NAS Kaneohe Bay.
- 17 February 1942: Plane No. 6 crashed on a predawn takeoff for a patrol from NAS Kaneohe Bay, killing all but one of the crew.
- 14 March – 23 May 1942: VP-72 deployed a detachment to Nouméa with six aircraft, returning on 23 May 1942. One aircraft hit a coral head while taxiing at Kanton Island, requiring two weeks to repair.
- 30 April 1942: During this period, patrol wing aircraft at NAS Kaneohe Bay were pooled. Since some squadrons had the newer PBY-5A, all hands had to do transition training in case they might have to fly that type aircraft. Initially, crews disliked the PBY-5A compared to the non-amphibious PBY-5. It was slower in the air, harder to get airborne, more vulnerable to damage in open-sea landings, and less capable of single-engine operation.
- 4 September – 7 October 1942: VP-72 began deploying to Luganville Seaplane Base, Espiritu Santo by sections, with the last plane arriving 13 September 1942. On 7 October 1942, the first action with the enemy took place when Lieutenant Cocowitch was fired on by a Japanese ship.
- 17 December 1942 – 6 January 1943: Ten new PBY-5A replacement aircraft were ferried to the squadron from NAS Kaneohe Bay. With the arrival of six more over the next week, the squadron complement was brought to 16 PBY-5As by 6 January 1943.
- 23 January 1943: One Japanese submarine probable kill was claimed by a squadron aircraft flying patrol in the Solomons area. Review of postwar enemy records does not indicate any losses by the enemy on this date.
- 6 July 1943: By mid-June 1943, the squadron had been relieved and began its return to the continental United States aboard USS Long Island. It was reformed on 6 July 1943, at NAS San Diego, remaining at this location undergoing crew training until mid-August.
- 23 August 1943: VP-72 completed its trans-Pacific flight from NAS San Diego to NAS Kaneohe Bay. The squadron trained at NAS Kaneohe Bay until 1 October 1943, when detachments were formed and deployed to Kanton, Baker, Johnston and Midway Islands.
- 1 November 1943: The detachments rejoined the squadron at NAS Kaneohe Bay. The squadron then formed two detachments for another deployment. Half of the squadron remained at NAS Kaneohe Bay, while the other half deployed to Funafuti.
- 11 November 1943: The NAS Kaneohe Bay detachment joined the rest of the squadron at Funafuti, with tender support provided by USS Curtiss. During this period the squadron was assigned sector searches, night anti-shipping patrols, and mine-laying and Dumbo (air-sea rescue) missions. By 1 December 1943, the squadron's mission shifted solely to Dumbo missions, with one to two aircraft detachments at Funafuti, Nanumea, Apamama, Tarawa and Makin islands. The Dumbo missions were often flown in coordination with fast surface warships or submarines posted along the routes strike aircraft flew on their missions. The aircraft located the downed aircrewsthen guided the ship or submarine to them. If surface conditions permitted, the seaplanes would land and rescue the crews.
- 1 January 1944: The new year brought with it a change of duties for the squadron. The PBYs were adapted for aerial minelaying. Several missions were conducted throughout the month, mining approaches to bypassed Japanese island garrisons to deny them resupply by sea.
- 1 February – 1 March 1944: In February, the squadron was consolidated at Funafuti for maintenance, while continuing to carry out a full mission schedule of patrols and Dumbo missions. Two aircraft had been lost without injuries to crews: one during takeoff, the other while attempting to land in rough seas during a Dumbo mission. By 1 March 1944, VP-72 was again split into detachments operating from Makin, Kwajalein and Eniwetok with tender support was provided by USS Mackinac.
- 8 June 1944: VP-72 was consolidated at Ebeye Island, with all aircraft and crews berthed ashore. Maintenance and overhaul of the remaining squadron aircraft were conducted to prepare them for the return to NAS Kaneohe Bay when relieved.
- 17 July 1944: VP-72 was relieved by VP-18 for return to NAS Kaneohe Bay and eventual transfer back to the continental United States.
- 1 August 1944: The squadron arrived at San Diego and all hands were given 30-day rehabilitation leave.
- 1 September – 1 October 1944: The squadron was reformed at NAAS Brown Field, California, under the operational control of FAW-14. The new squadron consisted of only seven crews training on the PB4Y-2 Privateer. On 1 October 1944, VP-72 was redesignated VPB-122.
- 30 November 1944: Six of the seven VPB-122 crews were reassigned to VPB-108 to bring that squadron up to its full complement. The squadron remained in an inactive status until replacement crews brought it back up to strength in early March 1945.
- 15 March 1945: VPB-122 was relocated to NAAS Crows Landing, California, under the operational control of FAW-8. The squadron conducted flight operations in PB4Y-1s in the vicinity of San Francisco and its offshore shipping approaches. Training was completed by the end of May 1945.
- 1 June 1945: The squadron was transferred to Ault Field, NAS Whidbey Island, Washington, under the operational control of FAW-6. Training flights were conducted from this location over the area surrounding Puget Sound. New PB4Y-2s were received in July.
- 5 August 1945: VPB-122 deployed to Shemya Air Force Base, Aleutians, under the operational control of FAW-4. Reconnaissance missions were flown from this location to within 50 miles (80 km) of Paramashir.
- 1 October 1945: VPB-122 was temporarily based at Casco Field, Attu Island, to transport squadron personnel to Seattle, Washington, for discharge.
- 2 June 1948: VP-HL-12 deployed to NAS Kodiak, Alaska. Navigation training, ice patrols from Kodiak to Point Barrow, and collection of data on Arctic ice cap topography comprised the majority of squadron duties.
- 18 January 1950: VP-29 was disestablished at NAS Whidbey Island.

== Aircraft assignments ==
The squadron was assigned the following aircraft, effective on the dates shown:

- PM-2 - November 1935
- P2Y-2 - Jun 1938
- PBY-5 - December 1940
- PBY-5A - December 1942
- PB4Y-2 September 1944

== Home port assignments ==
The squadron was assigned to these home ports, effective on the dates shown:

- NAS Norfolk, Virginia - 1 November 1935
- NS Charleston, South Carolina - 1 October 1939
- NAS Norfolk - 1 January 1941
- NAS Quonset Point, Rhode Island - 5 May 1941
- NAS Kaneohe Bay, Hawaii - 21 December 1941
- NAS San Diego, California - 1 July 1943
- NAS Kaneohe Bay - 23 August 1943
- NAS San Diego - 1 August 1944
- NAAS Brown Field, California - 1 September 1944
- NAAS Crows Landing, California - 15 March 1945
- NAS Whidbey Island, Washington - 1 June 1945

== See also ==
- Maritime patrol aircraft
- List of inactive United States Navy aircraft squadrons
- List of United States Navy aircraft squadrons
- List of squadrons in the Dictionary of American Naval Aviation Squadrons
- History of the United States Navy
