= VPB-213 =

Patrol Bombing Squadron 213
- Active: 1 October 1943 – 10 July 1945
- Country: United States of America
- Branch: United States Navy
- Type: squadron
- Role: Maritime patrol
- Engagements: World War II

Aircraft flown
- Patrol: PBM-3S

VPB-213 was a Patrol Bombing Squadron of the U.S. Navy. The squadron was established as Patrol Squadron Two Hundred Thirteen (VP-213) on 1 October 1943, redesignated Patrol Bombing Squadron Two Hundred Thirteen (VPB-213) on 1 October 1944 and disestablished on 10 July 1945.

== Operational history ==
- 1 October–November 1943: VP-213, a medium seaplane squadron flying the PBM-3S Mariner, was established at NAS Norfolk, Virginia, under the operational control of FAW-5. Training for squadron personnel commenced on 2 October 1944 at NAAS Harvey Point, North Carolina, and continued through the end of November. Twenty-eight of the assigned pilots were PBM qualified when reporting aboard. These officers assisted in training the remaining 15 new pilots by distributing them among the more experienced crews.
- 12 December 1943: The squadron's first operational loss occurred during a night training flight with a crew of 12 enlisted and four officers aboard. The aircraft, piloted by Lieutenant (jg) Lincoln G. Nordby, vanished without a trace, despite the efforts of 21 aircraft searching the sector over a two-day period. All hands were presumed lost.
- 18 December 1943: VPB-213 was transferred to NAS Key West, Florida, under the operational control of FAW-12 and brought to operational status with Anti-submarine warfare (ASW) patrols and coverage of the convoy lanes off the East Coast.
- 1 January 1944: The squadron was transferred to Nassau, Bahamas, for advanced base operations with tender support provided by USS Christiana. On 12 February a detachment was sent to NAAS Great Exuma, British West Indies, for night patrols due to inadequate lighting facilities at Nassau.
- 26 January 1944: The squadron suffered another night operational loss when aircraft P-3, flown by Lieutenant (jg) B. C. Herod, landed in an ammunition dump on Fleming Key, NAS Key West. The flight crew was using a flashlight to illuminate the instrument panel after the panel lights failed. The resulting glare blinded the pilots, who mistook the perimeter lights of the ammunition dump for the landing lights of the bay. Two officers and nine enlisted personnel were killed in the resulting explosion.
- 13 March 1944: The squadron came close to losing another aircraft while making an approach to NAS Key West in daylight. An Army anti aircraft battery was practicing with live ammunition at nearby Fort Taylor. One 37-mm shell penetrated aircraft P-11, flown by Ensign J. B. Clausen, removing the foot of AOM3c Morris. The Army officer in charge was subsequently tried by general court martial.
- 1 May 1944: VP-213 departed Nassau, Bahamas, for NAF Grand Cayman Island, British West Indies A detachment was maintained at Royal Island, British West Indies, aboard USS Christiana.
- 13 Sep 1944: A VPB-213 aircraft was sent out to locate USS Warrington as a hurricane moved towards the Bahaman Islands. The destroyer was spotted on radar but could not be reached due to the intensity of the storm. Water had entered her vents during the night causing power loss and electrical failure. The crew abandoned ship at 12:50 after fruitless attempts to save her and she went down almost immediately. Surface craft in the area were able to rescue only five officers and 68 enlisted personnel out of a complement of 321.
- 5 October 1944: The squadron complement of aircraft was reduced from 12 to 9. The extra aircraft and flight crews were transferred to VPB-99 at NAS Corpus Christi, Texas.
- 1–11 November 1944: The squadron was returned to NAS Key West, with eight aircraft and one on detached duty to Eleuthera Island, British West Indies. On 4 November, six aircraft were detached to NAS Quonset Point, Rhode Island, for temporary duty with Naval Air Task Unit, Quonset, returning on the 11th.
- 20 November 1944: VPB-213 was deployed to NAS Trinidad, British West Indies, coming under the operational control of FAW-11. The squadron provided convoy coverage from Naval Base Trinidad to NAF Rio de Janeiro, Brazil, with a detachment of aircraft at NAF Paramaribo, Dutch Guiana. The detachment was provided tender support by USS Thrush, based on the Surinam River.
- 27 January–7 February 1945: Detachments of five aircraft each participated in advanced base training with tender USS Albemarle.
- 2 April–Jun 1945: A three-aircraft, four-crew detachment was sent to NS San Juan, Puerto Rico, to relieve VPB-212. After completing the deployment to San Juan, two of the aircraft returned to Trinidad, to rejoin the squadron and the other plane was turned over to HEDRON-11 at NS San Juan. With the cessation of hostilities in Europe on 8 May, the duties of the squadron were reduced to training and ferrying of supplies and personnel between Trinidad and San Juan. On 27 June orders were received to turn in all aircraft to HEDRON-11 at NS San Juan. This was accomplished and all squadron personnel were loaded aboard USS Matagorda for transportation to NAS Norfolk.
- 10 July 1945: VPB-213 was disestablished at NAS Norfolk.

== Home port assignments ==
The squadron was assigned to these home ports, effective on the dates shown:

- NAS Norfolk, Virginia 1 October 1944
- NAAS Harvey Point, North Carolina 2 October 1944
- NAS Key West, Florida 18 December 1943
- Nassau, Bahamas 1 January 1944
- NAF Grand Cayman Island, British West Indies 1 May 1944
- NAS Key West, 1 November 1944
- NAS Port of Spain, Trinidad, British West Indies 20 Nov 1944
- NAS Norfolk, June 1944

== See also ==
- Maritime patrol aircraft
- List of inactive United States Navy aircraft squadrons
- List of United States Navy aircraft squadrons
- List of squadrons in the Dictionary of American Naval Aviation Squadrons
- History of the United States Navy
