= VP-HL-5 =

Landplane of the U.S. Navy

Heavy Patrol Squadron (Landplane) 5
- Active: 15 June 1943 – 27 May 1947
- Country: United States of America
- Branch: United States Navy
- Type: squadron
- Role: Maritime patrol
- Engagements: World War II

Aircraft flown
- Patrol: PV-1; PB4Y-1; PB4Y-2

VP-HL-5 was a Heavy Patrol Squadron (Landplane) of the U.S. Navy. The squadron was established as Bombing Squadron 143 (VB-143) on 15 June 1943, redesignated Patrol Bombing Squadron 143 (VPB-143) on 1 October 1944, redesignated Patrol Squadron 143 (VP-143) on 15 May 1946, redesignated Heavy Patrol Squadron (Landplane) 5 (VP-HL-5) on 15 November 1946 and disestablished on 27 May 1947.

== Operational history ==
- 15 Jun–26 Jul 1943: VB-143 was established at Naval Air Station DeLand, Florida, as a medium bombing squadron flying the PV-1 Ventura. While at DeLand, the squadron came under the operational control of FAW-12. On 26 July, the squadron was relocated to Naval Auxiliary Air Field Boca Chica, Florida, for operational, shakedown and ASW training.
- 16 August 1943: VB-143 was given orders to depart Boca Chica for duty at NAF Recife, Brazil, under the operational control of FAW-16. The squadron was fully operational within a month and was able to claim that throughout the duration of its stay at Recife no ships were sunk in any of the convoys protected by the squadron.
- 28 January 1944: The squadron was relocated from NAF Recife to Ipitanaga Field, Brazil, located approximately 30 miles (48 km) from Bahia. At this station the squadron was involved in cooperative efforts with ZP-42 (an LTA squadron), VP-204 and VP-211 (both PBM-3S Mariner squadrons). VB-143 was given the dawn and dusk sweeps, convoy coverage and any night missions that were required.
- 10 May 1944: VB-142 was ordered to Hato Field, Curaçao, for work with VS-37 in patrolling the immediate area surrounding the islands. Operational control over the squadron was exercised by FAW-11. No contacts were made during this period, and no vessels or convoys were attacked.
- 24 June – October 1944: The squadron was relieved for return to Naval Auxiliary Air Station Boca Chica, under the operational control of FAW-12. On 5 July 1944, the squadron was detached from FAW-12 to become a squadron in training under the operational control of FAW-5 at NAAS Boca Chica. The squadron began an intensive course on rocket firing and updated Anti-submarine warfare (ASW) techniques, expecting orders to duty as a PV squadron. On 24 October 1944 the squadron was informed that it was to become a patrol bombing squadron flying the PB4Y-1 Liberator.
- 5 November 1944 – Mar 1945: The squadron commanding officer, Lieutenant Commander Edmonds David and six crews were flown to Naval Auxiliary Air Station Chincoteague, Virginia, for a conversion training course on the PB4Y-1. The remainder of the squadron was required to maintain 12 Ventura crews in readiness at NAAS Boca Chica, until relieved by another squadron. The last crews in training at NAAS Chincoteague returned to Boca Chica in mid-March 1945, having completed the first part of their training in PB4Y-1 aircraft. They rejoined the squadron as it continued its training program in the use of radar bombing equipment.
- 28 April 1945: The commanding officer and nine crews with six aircraft departed NAAS Boca Chica for NAS New York, New York, leaving nine crews and six aircraft at Boca Chica still in radar bombing training. On 19 May, the Boca Chica section completed training and reported for duty at NAS Quonset Point, Rhode Island. Both squadron sections came under the command of FAW-9 during this tour of duty, completing 26 ASW and convoy patrol missions through 22 May.
- 13 June 1945: The squadron's 12 PB4Y-1 Liberators were turned over to HEDRON-9.
- 20 June – July 1945: VPB-143 reported for duty under training at NAAS Camp Kearney, California, under the operational control of FAW-14. Twelve new PB4Y-2 Privateer aircraft were assigned to the squadron. Training on bombing, radar attack, gunnery, fighter affiliation and long-range search problems continued through the end of July.
- 9 August 1945: The advance echelon of ground staff and six spare crews departed by ship for NAS Kaneohe Bay, Hawaii. The 12 remaining crews flew the squadron's 12 PB4Y-2 Privateers from NAAS Camp Kearney, Calif., to NAS Kaneohe Bay on 21 August, arriving on the 22nd. The combat training syllabus in gunnery, radar bombing and search was begun immediately.
- September 1945 – May 1947: Although training continued through the end of September 1945, the Surrender of Japan left the squadron with no further mission to perform. NAS Kaneohe Bay became the squadron's home port and it remained there with a reduced aircraft complement of 9 PB4Y-2 Privateers until its disestablishment on 27 May 1947.

== Aircraft assignments ==
The squadron was assigned the following aircraft, effective on the dates shown:

- PV-1 - June 1943
- PB4Y-1 - November 1944
- PB4Y-2 - June 1945

== Home port assignments ==
The squadron was assigned to these home ports, effective on the dates shown:

- Naval Air Station DeLand, Florida - 15 June 1943
- Naval Auxiliary Air Field Boca Chica, Florida - 26 July 1943
- NAF Recife, Brazil - 16 August 1943
- Ipitanaga Field, Brazil - 28 January 1944
- Hato Field, Curaçao - 10 May 1944
- Naval Auxiliary Air Station Boca Chica - 24 June 1944
- Naval Air Station New York, New York - 28 April 1945
- Naval Air Station Quonset Point, Rhode Island - 19 May 1945
- NAAS Camp Kearney, California - 20 Jun 1945
- Naval Air Station Kaneohe Bay, Hawaii - 21 August 1945

== See also ==
- Maritime patrol aircraft
- List of inactive United States Navy aircraft squadrons
- List of United States Navy aircraft squadrons
- List of squadrons in the Dictionary of American Naval Aviation Squadrons
- History of the United States Navy
