= VPB-210 =

Patrol Bombing Squadron 210
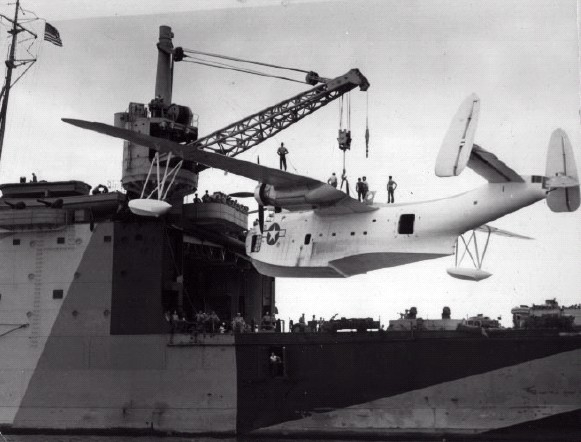
- VPB-210 PBM-3S is lifted aboard USS Albemarle at NAS Guantanamo Bay in January 1945
- Active: 15 January 1943 – 10 July 1945
- Country: United States of America
- Branch: United States Navy
- Type: squadron
- Role: Maritime patrol
- Engagements: World War II

Aircraft flown
- Patrol: PBM-3C/S

VPB-210 was a Patrol Bombing Squadron of the U.S. Navy. The squadron was established as Patrol Squadron Two Hundred Ten (VP-210) on 15 January 1943, redesignated Patrol Bombing Squadron Two Hundred Ten (VPB-210) on 1 October 1944 and disestablished on 10 July 1945.

== Operational history ==
- 15 January 1943: VP-210 was established at NAS Norfolk, Virginia, as a medium seaplane squadron flying the PBM-3C Mariner under the operational control of FAW-5. Ground training for the squadron continued through April, with aircraft familiarization training given with crews alternating at NAAS Banana River, Florida. Ground and flight training was completed in August, and the squadron was transferred to NAS Quonset Point, Rhode Island, on 9 August for advanced Anti-submarine warfare (ASW) training. Training was completed with shakedown at NAAS Harvey Point, North Carolina, from 25 August through 10 September 1943.
- 11 August 1943: The first section of six VP-210 aircraft was transferred to NAS Guantanamo Bay, Cuba. Duties consisted of convoy coverage, antisubmarine sweeps and rescue missions. The squadron's first casualties occurred on the 18th, when Lieutenant (jg) Joseph P. Willetts and his crew crashed while training with a friendly submarine 12 miles (19 km) south of Montauk Point, Long Island. All hands were lost.
- 12 October 1943: Lieutenant (jg) Daniel T. Felix Jr., and the crew of P-9 made a radar contact at night on a surface target during coverage of the Guantanamo-Trinidad convoy. The target was visually identified as a submarine, although the actual time the target was in sight was measured in seconds. Felix initiated an attack run, and at 8:51 pm local his bombardier dropped three Mark 47 depth charges and one Mark 4 Mod 4 100 lb (45 kg) general purpose bomb. One depth charge failed to detonate due to a faulty arming mechanism on the aircraft, and the bomb failed to detonate due to not having sufficient time to arm because of the low altitude of the aircraft at release. Felix circled around with the intent to re-attack, but when they arrived over the attack datum a yellow flare dropped by them revealed only a disturbed patch of white water and bubbles. A subsequent Court of Inquiry (COI) that looked into this incident revealed that it was likely that they attacked USS Dorado (SS-248), an American submarine in transit to the Panama Canal, and that Dorado was likely lost as a result of that attack. Two hours after the first attack, Lieutenant Felix and his crew encountered another submarine on the surface and when they attempted to exchange recognition signals they were opposed by intense anti-aircraft fire from the submarine, which submerged before a bombing attack could be made. This submarine was German U-boat U-214, and the event was confirmed when her log was examined after the war. Both the submarine and aircraft escaped unharmed.
- October–December 1943: A three-aircraft detachment of USAAF 23d Antisubmarine Squadron (Heavy) was attached to VP-210 for ASW operations in the Caribbean. This detachment flew the B-25 Mitchell medium bomber equipped with 75-mm cannon. The PBM aircraft of VP-210 were to locate the U-boats and illuminate them with flares for the B-25s. Unfortunately, no enemy contacts developed to test the effectiveness of this unique tactic.
- 1 November 1943: A five-aircraft detachment was based at Great Exuma, British West Indies, remaining until relieved by VP-32 in December. The detachment relieved VP-32 again from 30 June through 23 August 1944.
- 26 May 1944: Lieutenant J. F. Slavic and his crew made a forced landing during patrol due to a loose engine cowling. After landing safely and securing the cowl, the aircraft lost one engine during the takeoff. In the subsequent crash, the crew safely exited the sinking aircraft. All hands were rescued after 11 hours.
- 1 July 1944: Lieutenant Francis Gerli collided with the crash boat during takeoff at Great Exuma, resulting in an explosion which destroyed the boat and the aircraft. Six personnel in the aircraft were killed in the accident, with five more seriously injured.
- 4 October 1944: The squadron was reduced from 12 aircraft to 9 aircraft, with 14 combat aircrews. Personnel and aircraft detached from the squadron were sent to VPB-99.
- November 1944: Two VPB-210 Mariners were fitted with two L8 searchlights apiece. Four of the squadron's crews were given training in use of the lights.
- 17 June–10 July 1945: Operations were discontinued at NAS Guantanamo Bay and preparations were begun for disestablishment of the squadron. Aircraft were flown to NS San Juan, Puerto Rico, and turned over to HEDRON-11. On 2 July 1945, the entire squadron boarded USS Rehoboth for transportation to NAS Norfolk. On 10 July 1945, the squadron was disestablished.

== Aircraft assignments ==
The squadron was assigned the following aircraft, effective on the dates shown:

- PBM-3C February 1943
- PBM-3S August 1943

== Home port assignments ==
The squadron was assigned to these home ports, effective on the dates shown:

- NAS Norfolk, Virginia 15 January 1943
- NAS Guantanamo Bay, Cuba 11 August 1943
- NAS Norfolk, 2 July 1945

== See also ==
- Maritime patrol aircraft
- List of inactive United States Navy aircraft squadrons
- List of United States Navy aircraft squadrons
- List of squadrons in the Dictionary of American Naval Aviation Squadrons
- History of the United States Navy
