= VPB-209 =

Patrol Bombing Squadron 209
- Active: 1 January 1943 – 20 June 1945
- Country: United States of America
- Branch: United States Navy
- Type: squadron
- Role: Maritime patrol
- Engagements: World War II

Aircraft flown
- Patrol: PBM-3C/S

VPB-209 was a Patrol Bombing Squadron of the U.S. Navy. The squadron was established as Patrol Squadron Two Hundred Nine (VP-209) on 1 January 1943, redesignated Patrol Bombing Squadron Two Hundred Nine (VPB-209) on 1 October 1944 and disestablished on 20 June 1945.

== Operational history ==
- 1 January – August 1943: VP-209 was established at NAS Norfolk, Virginia, as a medium seaplane squadron flying the PBM-3C Mariner under the operational control of FAW-5. Training and aircraft familiarization continued through mid-July 1943, when the squadron was relocated to NAAS Harvey Point, North Carolina, for shakedown training under Transitional Training Squadron Atlantic. On 9 August the squadron was transferred to NAS Quonset Point, Rhode Island, training in advanced Anti-submarine warfare tactics by Air Antisubmarine Development Detachment Atlantic.
- 23 August 1943: VP-209 was returned to Breezy Point, NAS Norfolk, for commencement of convoy coverage patrols off the East Coast of the U.S. There were no enemy contacts during this period.
- 30 December 1943: The squadron complement of aircraft was increased from 12 to 15 PBM-3S aircraft.
- 2 February 1944: VP-209 was transferred to NAAF Salinas, Ecuador, where security patrols were flown in the Pacific sector of the Panama Sea Frontier. Three daily patrols were flown between Salinas, and Galapagos Islands, Ecuador and Corinto, Nicaragua.
- 14 July 1944: Lieutenant (jg) Robert C. Carlson and his crew made a forced landing at sea during a night mission due to fuel system failure. The aircraft was a total loss, but no serious injuries to the crew resulted from the ditching.
- 16 July 1944: Lieutenant Robert D. Spannuth and his crew crashed at sea during a night mission while investigating a possible surface target with their searchlight. The aircraft and crew were lost.
- October 1944: VPB-209 was reduced from 12 to 9 aircraft, with three crews and aircraft being transferred to VPB-99.
- 28 February 1945: The squadron administrative headquarters were transferred from NAS Coco Solo, Panama Canal Zone, to NAAF Galapagos, Ecuador, with tender support provided by USS Albemarle. During the deployment the squadron anchored in Tagus Cove, Isabella Island, Galapagos Islands. The headquarters remained at this site until 30 May 1945. There were no enemy contacts during this period.
- 31 May 1945: Orders were received to turn all of the squadron's aircraft to HEDRON-3 at NAS Coco Solo, and proceed aboard USS Sangamon to NAS Norfolk for disestablishment.
- 20 June 1945: VPB-209 was disestablished at NAS Norfolk.

== Aircraft assignments ==
The squadron was assigned the following aircraft, effective on the dates shown:

- PBM-3C February 1943
- PBM-3S September 1943

== Home port assignments ==
The squadron was assigned to these home ports, effective on the dates shown:

- NAS Norfolk, Virginia 1 January 1943
- NAAS Harvey Point, North Carolina 15 July 1943
- NAS Quonset Point, Rhode Island 9 August 1943
- NAS Norfolk, 23 August 1943
- NAAF Salinas, Ecuador 2 February 1944
- NAS Coco Solo, Panama Canal Zone October 1944
- NAAF Galapagos, Ecuador 28 February 1945
- NAS Coco Solo, 31 May 1945
- NAS Norfolk, June 1945

== See also ==
- Maritime patrol aircraft
- List of inactive United States Navy aircraft squadrons
- List of United States Navy aircraft squadrons
- List of squadrons in the Dictionary of American Naval Aviation Squadrons
- History of the United States Navy
