= VPB-203 =

American naval unit

Patrol Bombing Squadron 203
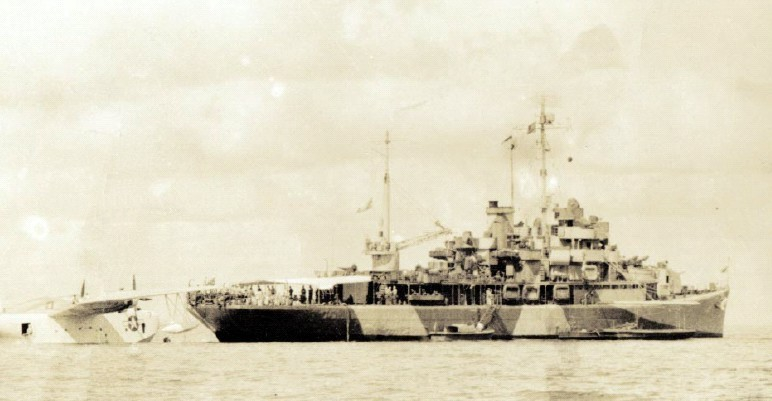
- VPB-203 PBM with USS Humboldt in April 1945
- Active: 1 October 1942 – 30 June 1945
- Country: United States of America
- Branch: United States Navy
- Type: squadron
- Role: Maritime patrol
- Nickname(s): Midnite Mariners
- Engagements: World War II

Aircraft flown
- Patrol: PBM-3C/S

VPB-203 was a Patrol Bombing Squadron of the U.S. Navy. The squadron was established as Patrol Squadron Two Hundred Three (VP-203) on 1 October 1942, redesignated Patrol Bombing Squadron Two Hundred Three (VPB-203) on 1 October 1944 and disestablished on 30 June 1945.

== Operational history ==
- 1 October 1942: VP-203 was established at NAS Norfolk, Virginia, as a medium seaplane patrol squadron flying the PBM-3C Mariner. While in training the squadron came under the operational control of PatWing-5. The squadron complement was 15 aircraft, three of which were spares.
- 10 December 1942–February 1943: A six-aircraft detachment of the squadron flew to NS San Juan, Puerto Rico, for a period of shakedown and Anti-submarine warfare (ASW) training, coming under the operational control of FAW-11. The remainder of the squadron joined the detachment at intervals over the next two weeks. The squadron's first operational loss occurred on 31 December 1942 when Lieutenant (jg) E. M. Vogel crashed on takeoff in San Juan Bay, killing three of the crew. When aviation gasoline supplies ran short at San Juan, six aircraft were sent to Naval Base Guantanamo Bay, Cuba, for training on 31 January 1943. In February the squadron was transferred back to NAS Norfolk. All of the aircraft arrived at Norfolk by 1 March, ready for return to operational status.
- 1 March–June 1943: VP-203 commenced regular operational duties under the operational control of FAW-5, escorting convoys and conducting ASW patrols. The first attack on a U-boat took place on 10 June 1943, but with negative results due to a defective bomb-release mechanism.
- 17 June 1943: The squadron's PBM-3Cs underwent conversion to the "S" or "stripped" model. Turrets, armor plate and other extraneous gear were removed to make room for extra fuel and to lighten the aircraft to enable a greater range on patrols.
- 18 July 1943: Lieutenant Commander Morris D. Burns relieved Lieutenant Commander James R. Reedy as the squadron's commanding officer. Commander Reedy and approximately half of the squadron pilots and plane crews detached to form a new PB4Y-1 Liberator squadron, VB-110. Four crews from VP-209 and five from VP-211 were transferred to VP-203 to bring it back up to full strength.
- 1–25 September 1943: Attacks were made on U-boats on 1 and 4 September. Both obtained negative results. On 25 September, the squadron moved to a new home port at NAS Floyd Bennett Field, New York, placing the squadron under the operational control of FAW-9. Its principal duties remained the same as before, ASW and convoy escort.
- 4 October 1943: VP-203 received orders to deploy to NAF Aratu, Bahia, Brazil, to relieve VP-74. The squadron was then placed under the operational control of FAW-16. The squadron's aircraft continued to arrive at Aratu through 23 November, a detachment of five aircraft was formed and sent to NAF Natal, Brazil, for advanced base operations. This group conducted sweeps out to 600 miles (970 km) from shore.
- 5 January 1944: While on patrol Lieutenant S. V. Brown sighted a suspicious-looking merchant vessel. Subsequent investigation proved that the ship was actually the German blockade runner MV Burgenland. USS Omaha and USS Jouett were dispatched to the scene and sank the ship after a running gun battle.
- 16 January 1944: VP-203 relocated its administrative headquarters to NAF Galeão, Rio de Janeiro, Brazil, with one detachment. One squadron detachment remained at NAF Natal and another at NAF Aratu, Brazil. The Aratu detachment rejoined the squadron at Galeão on 23 January.
- 4 Apr 1944: A U-boat was spotted on the surface at night using the wing-mounted Leigh light. The aircraft made a strafing run, forcing the submarine to crash dive, but with negative results.
- 21 April 1944: Lieutenant (jg) W. N. Britton and his crew spotted 20 British sailors adrift in a small life raft, survivors of a torpedoed merchantman. Ironically, none of the 20 sailors in the raft had been harmed during their ordeal until Britton's crew dropped supplies of food and water directly on the raft, knocking one man unconscious. The victims were safely picked up a short time later.
- 16 May 1944: The Natal detachment relocated to Aratu, then on to Florianoplis, Brazil, for advanced base operations. Tender support was provided by USS Matagorda. These operations were discontinued on 30 July, and they rejoined the Aratu detachment. On 14 August the remainder of the squadron, including the headquarters group, joined the detachment at Aratu. One detachment remained at Galeão until 5 November.
- 20 July 1944: The squadron's second operational loss occurred when Lieutenant Livio DeBonis and his crew failed to return from a routine patrol. A merchant ship later confirmed that an aircraft crashed, with no survivors, at coordinates matching DeBonis’ patrol sector.
- 4 October 1944: Four VPB-203 crews were detached from the squadron and ordered to duty at NAS Corpus Christi, Texas. The losses were not replaced, decreasing the squadron aircraft complement from 15 to a total of 9.
- 21 November 1944: One of the squadron aircraft was lost en route from Natal to Aratu during an intense tropical thunderstorm. Aircraft wreckage, an oil slick and empty life rafts were found at sea, but no survivors.
- 5 January 1945: A detachment of aircraft was sent to NAF Aratu, with tender services provided by USS Rehoboth and later USS Matagorda. A second detachment was formed on the 21st at Bahia based on USS Rockaway and a third detachment was sent to Natal, Brazil.
- 29 May 1945: VPB-203 was relieved for return to NAS San Juan, where all of the squadron aircraft were turned over to HEDRON-11. Squadron personnel were transported aboard USS U. S. Grant to New Orleans, Louisiana, then by train to NAS Norfolk, where the squadron was disestablished on 30 June 1945.

== Aircraft assignments ==
The squadron was assigned the following aircraft, effective on the dates shown:

- PBM-3C October 1942
- PBM-3S June 1943

== Home port assignments ==
The squadron was assigned to these home ports, effective on the dates shown:

- NAS Norfolk, Virginia 1 October 1942
- NS San Juan, Puerto Rico December 1942
- NAS Norfolk, 1 March 1943
- NAS Floyd Bennett Field, New York 25 September 1943
- NAF Aratu, Brazil 4 October 1943
- NAF Galeão, Brazil 16 January 1944
- NAF Aratu, 14 August 1944
- NS San Juan, 29 May 1945
- NAS Norfolk, June 1945

== See also ==
- Maritime patrol aircraft
- List of inactive United States Navy aircraft squadrons
- List of United States Navy aircraft squadrons
- List of squadrons in the Dictionary of American Naval Aviation Squadrons
- History of the United States Navy
