= VPB-215 =

Patrol Bombing Squadron 215
- Active: 1 November 1943 – 28 May 1945
- Country: United States of America
- Branch: United States Navy
- Type: squadron
- Role: Maritime patrol
- Engagements: World War II

Aircraft flown
- Patrol: PBM-3S

VPB-215 was a Patrol Bombing Squadron of the U.S. Navy. The squadron was established as Patrol Squadron Two Hundred Fifteen (VP-215) on 1 November 1943, redesignated Patrol Bombing Squadron Two Hundred Fifteen (VPB-215) on 1 October 1944 and disestablished on 28 May 1945.

== Operational history ==
- 1 November 1943–January 1944: VP-215, a medium seaplane squadron flying the PBM-3S Mariner, was established at NAAS Harvey Point, North Carolina, under the operational control of FAW-5. Training at Harvey Point continued through January 1944, when the squadron was transferred to NAS Key West, Florida, for shakedown and advanced Anti-submarine warfare (ASW) training.
- 26 February–March 1944: VP-215 achieved operational status and was transferred to NAS Port of Spain, Trinidad, British West Indies, for convoy coverage and ASW sweeps of the Caribbean basin under the operational control of FAW11. On 8 March, a six-aircraft detachment was sent to NAS Coco Solo, Panama Canal Zone, for ASW sweeps under the operational control of FAW-3.
- 16 April 1944: VP-215 was transferred to NAS Bermuda, British West Indies, for daytime convoy coverage and ASW sweeps under the operational control of FAW-9.
- 4 October 1944: VPB-215 was reduced in personnel by 25 percent, with three aircraft being transferred permanently to NAS Corpus Christi, Texas.
- 17 April–May 1945: VPB-215 was transferred to NAS Norfolk, Virginia. Wartime operations of convoy patrols and ASW sweeps ceased on 18 May 1945. Orders were received to deliver all squadron aircraft to HEDRON 5–2 at NAAS Harvey Point, in preparation for disestablishment of the squadron.
- 28 May 1945: VPB-215 was disestablished at NAS Norfolk.

== Home port assignments ==
The squadron was assigned to these home ports, effective on the dates shown:

- NAAS Harvey Point, North Carolina 1 November 1943
- NAS Key West, Florida January 1944
- NAS Port of Spain, Trinidad, British West Indies 26 February 1944
- NAS Bermuda, British West Indies 16 April 1944
- NAS Norfolk, Virginia 17 April 1945

== See also ==
- Maritime patrol aircraft
- List of inactive United States Navy aircraft squadrons
- List of United States Navy aircraft squadrons
- List of squadrons in the Dictionary of American Naval Aviation Squadrons
- History of the United States Navy
