= VP-48 =

Patrol Squadron 48
- Active: 15 December 1942 – 31 December 1949
- Country: United States of America
- Branch: United States Navy
- Type: squadron
- Role: Maritime patrol
- Engagements: World War II

Aircraft flown
- Patrol: PBM 3S/5

VP-48 was a Patrol Squadron of the U.S. Navy. It was established as VP-208 on 15 December 1942, redesignated Patrol Bombing Squadron VPB-208 on 1 October 1944, redesignated VP-208 on 15 May 1946, redesignated Medium Patrol Squadron (Seaplane) VP-MS-8 on 15 November 1946, redesignated VP-48 on 1 September 1948 and disestablished on 31 December 1949. It was the first squadron to be assigned the VP-48 designation. A second VP-48 was established in May 1946 and disestablished on 23 May 1991.

== Operational history ==
- 15 December 1942: VP-208 was established at NAS Norfolk, Virginia, as a seaplane squadron flying the PBM-3C Mariner. During this period the squadron came under the operational control of FAW-5. Due to the holidays, squadron personnel did not begin the training syllabus until 4 January 1943. On the 17th the first aircraft were received and flight familiarization training commenced.
- 1 February–10 March 1943: VP-208 was relocated to NAS Corpus Christi, Texas, for shake-down training, remaining under the operational control of FAW-5. Training was concluded on 10 March 1943.
- 12 March 1943: VP-208 reported aboard at NAS Key West, Florida, for training under the operational control of FAW-12. The squadron was assigned new PBM-3S aircraft with improved radar.
- 15 April 1943: The squadron commenced its first operational patrols from an advanced base at Pelican Harbor, British West Indies, supported by the tender USS Christiana.
- 15 November 1943: VP-208 relocated to Grand Cayman, remaining there until 1 May 1944.
- 8 May–30 July 1944: VP-208 relocated to another advanced base at Royal Island, British West Indies, supported by USS Christiana. The squadron remained at this location until 30 July, when the squadron was transferred to NAS Norfolk.
- August 1944: Following the relocation to NAS Norfolk, the squadron was given home leave. VP-208 refitted at NAS Norfolk, Va., and received the PBM-5 Mariner on 22 August. Training on the new airframe continued at Norfolk through the first week of September.
- 7 September 1944: VP-208 relocated to NAAS Harvey Point, North Carolina, for further operational and predeployment training which continued until the end of October.
- 4–15 November 1944: The squadron was deemed ready for deployment and began the transcontinental flight from NAAS Harvey Point to NAS Alameda, California, where it came briefly under the operational control of FAW-8. The flight crews and ground staff took two weeks to thoroughly overhaul the aircraft for the pending trans-Pacific flight to NAS Kaneohe Bay, Hawaii.
- 30 November 1944: The aircrews departed NAS Alameda for NAS Kaneohe Bay, in three aircraft elements. The ground support staff, equipment and supplies for the squadron proceeded aboard USS Attu. All personnel were aboard NAS Kaneohe by 8 December, coming under the operational control of FAW-2. Training in Anti-submarine warfare (ASW) and aerial gunnery commenced immediately. Crews received practical experience conducting operational patrols off the Hawaiian Islands.
- 8 February 1945: VPB-208 reported to FAW-1 at Saipan. Duties at this location consisted of antishipping patrols and reconnaissance.
- 25 February 1945: The squadron relocated to the waters off Ulithi, reporting with 13 serviceable aircraft. Tender support was provided by USS Castle Rock, USS Casco, and USS Suisun.
- 16 March 1945: A relatively rare bombing mission was scheduled for the squadron when it was selected to bomb the Japanese airfield on Yap Island.
- 20 March–21 June 1945: Twenty-one officers and 67 enlisted personnel departed for Guam to board USS Hamlin for transport to Kerama Rhetto Island, Nansei Shoto. The Battle of Okinawa had begun on 18 March, and Kerama Rhetto was occupied on 25–26 March. The first VPB-208 Mariner landed offshore on 31 March. The tender-based patrol squadrons conducted long-range antishipping searches over the East China Sea to protect assault forces from enemy surface force interference, flew ASW patrols in the combat area, and provided air-sea rescue services for carrier operations through the end of the campaign on 21 June 1945.
- 14 July 1945: VPB-208 departed Kerama Rhetto for Chimu Wan, Okinawa, supported by the USS Hamlin. The squadron's last wartime operational flight was made from this location on 11 August 1945. On the 15th the aircrews boarded USS Kenneth Whiting and USS Corson en route to its next duty station, Tokyo Bay, Japan.
- 31 August 1945: VPB-208 took off from Chimu Wan and flew north to Tokyo Bay to participate in duties with the U.S. occupation forces in Japan.
- 31 December 1949: VP-48 was disestablished.

== Home port assignments ==
The squadron was assigned to these home ports, effective on the dates shown:

- NAS Norfolk, Virginia - 15 December 1942
- NAS Corpus Christi, Texas - 1 February 1943
- NAS Key West, Florida - 12 March 1943
- NAS Norfolk - 30 July 1944
- NAAS Harvey Point, North Carolina - 7 September 1944
- NAS Alameda, California - November 1944
- NAS Kaneohe Bay, Hawaii - December 1944
- Yokosuka Naval Base, Japan - August 1945
- NAS Norfolk - 3 January 1946
- NAS Jacksonville, Florida - May 1946
- NAS Trinidad, B.W.I. Sep 1946

== Aircraft assignment ==
The squadron first received the following aircraft on the dates shown:

- PBM-3C - December 1942
- PBM-3S - March 1943
- PBM-5 - August 1944

== See also ==
- Maritime patrol aircraft
- List of inactive United States Navy aircraft squadrons
- List of United States Navy aircraft squadrons
- List of squadrons in the Dictionary of American Naval Aviation Squadrons
- History of the United States Navy
- History of VPB 208 squadron, including unit history
