= VPB-207 =

Patrol Bombing Squadron 207
- Active: 1 December 1942 – 26 June 1945
- Country: United States of America
- Branch: United States Navy
- Type: squadron
- Role: Maritime patrol
- Engagements: World War II

Aircraft flown
- Patrol: PBM-3C/S

VPB-207 was a Patrol Bombing Squadron of the U.S. Navy. The squadron was established as Patrol Squadron Two Hundred Seven (VP-207) on 1 December 1942, redesignated Patrol Bombing Squadron Two Hundred Seven (VPB-207) on 1 October 1944 and disestablished on 26 June 1945.

== Operational history ==
- 1 December 1942: VP-207 was established at NAS Norfolk, Virginia, as a medium seaplane squadron flying the PBM-3C Mariner under the operational control of FAW-5. Training and aircraft familiarization was conducted through mid-January 1943.
- 22 January–February 1943: VP-207 was transferred to NS San Juan, Puerto Rico, under the operational control of FAW-11. After three weeks the squadron was transferred to NAAF Salinas. A detachment was sent to NAAF Galapagos, Seymour Island, Ecuador, arriving on 11 February 1943. The squadron flew patrol between Salinas, the Galapagos Islands and Corinto, Nicaragua. During the first month at Salinas, three crews and aircraft were on detached duty to NAS Jamaica, British West Indies, to assist in Anti-submarine warfare (ASW) "hot spot" searches.
- 13 May 1943: Lieutenant (jg) William Beyer and crew made a forced landing at sea two miles from NS San Juan. The aircraft sank, but no crewmen were injured.
- 15 March 1944: Crew P-42 with PPC Lieutenant Richard Boehme spotted a U-boat on the surface at 23:19 and began circling for a favorable position preparatory to a bombing run. Anti-aircraft fire from the submarine damaged the aircraft before an attack could be made and wounded Ensign Douglas K. Kelsey. The aircraft returned safely to base. On 17 March what was suspected to be the same submarine was attacked at 02:27 by crew P-50, flown by Lieutenant (jg) Bowen S. Larkins, with negative results. A third crew, P-44, spotted the same submarine on the same night at 03:47, but made no bombing run or exchange of gunfire. The pilot was later admonished by Commander Panama Sea Frontier for failure to engage the enemy.
- 16 April 1944: Lieutenant Wilson Van Alst Jr., and crew made a forced night landing at sea after losing the port engine while on convoy escort duty. The aircraft was safely ditched 200 miles (320 km) northeast of NAS Coco Solo, Panama Canal Zone. The Mariner quickly sank, but all of the crew exited the aircraft without injury, spending 18 hours in life rafts before rescue the next day.
- 17 May 1944: VP-207 was relieved for return to NAS Key West, Florida. The squadron engaged in ASW training through 6 June 1944.
- 6 June 1944: Upon completion of the advanced ASW training syllabus, the squadron was transferred to NAS Bermuda, operating under the operational control of FAW-9, Bermuda Air Group. Duties consisted of training flights and convoy patrols.
- 20 August 1944: Lieutenant (jg) Stanley C. Smith and seven crewmen were killed in a crash approximately 25 miles (40 km) north of Bermuda while on an ASW practice bombing hop. Cause of the crash was unknown.
- 16–26 June 1945: VPB-207 received orders to disestablish. The squadron assets were turned over to HEDRON-9 at NAS Bermuda, and the personnel boarded USS Matagorda for return to NAS Norfolk. On 26 June 1945 the squadron was disestablished.

== Aircraft assignments ==
The squadron was assigned the following aircraft, effective on the dates shown:

- PBM-3C January 1943
- PBM-3S August 1943

== Home port assignments ==
The squadron was assigned to these home ports, effective on the dates shown:

- NAS Norfolk, Virginia 1 December 1942
- NS San Juan, Puerto Rico 22 January 1943
- NAAF Salinas, Ecuador 14 February 1943
- NAS Key West, Florida 17 May 1944
- NAS Bermuda, British West Indies 6 June 1944
- NAS Norfolk, 16 June 1945

== See also ==
- Maritime patrol aircraft
- List of inactive United States Navy aircraft squadrons
- List of United States Navy aircraft squadrons
- List of squadrons in the Dictionary of American Naval Aviation Squadrons
- History of the United States Navy
