= VPB-206 =

Patrol Bombing Squadron 206
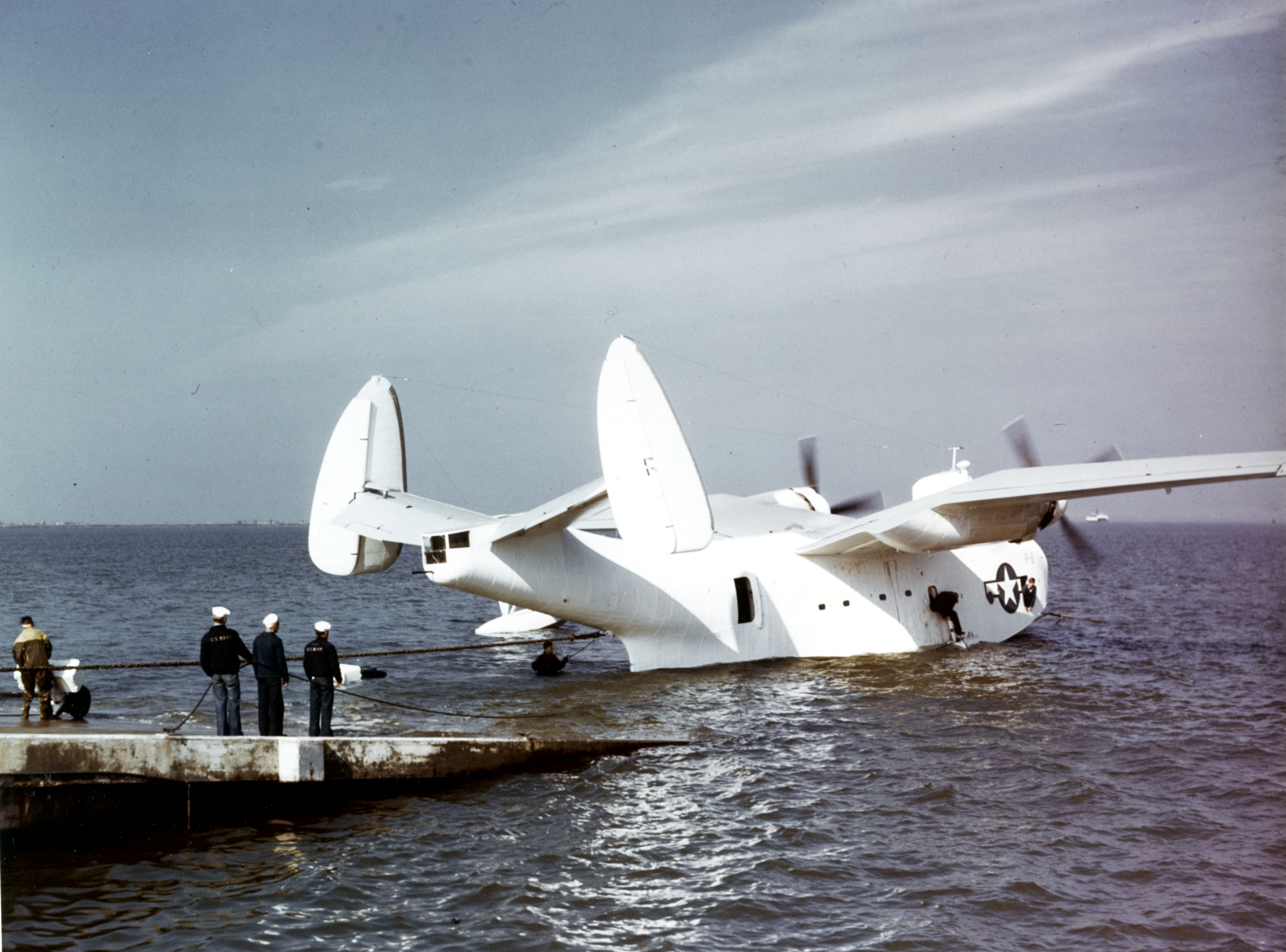
- VPB-206 PBM-3 c.1944
- Active: 15 November 1942 – 4 June 1945
- Country: United States of America
- Branch: United States Navy
- Type: squadron
- Role: Maritime patrol
- Engagements: World War II

Aircraft flown
- Patrol: PBM-3/C/S; PBY-5

VPB-206 was a Patrol Bombing Squadron of the U.S. Navy. The squadron was established as Patrol Squadron Two Hundred Six (VP-206) on 15 November 1942, redesignated Patrol Bombing Squadron Two Hundred Six (VPB-206) on 1 October 1944 and disestablished on 4 June 1945.

== Operational history ==
- 15 November 1942: VP-206 was established at NAS Norfolk, Virginia, under the operational control of FAW-5 as a medium seaplane squadron flying the PBM-3C Mariner. On 21 January 1943 the squadron was transferred to NAS Charleston, South Carolina, for advanced training in bombing, gunnery, navigation and Anti-submarine warfare (ASW). The squadron then operated with its full complement of PBM-3C aircraft equipped with the ASV Mark II radar.
- 1 April 1943: VP-206 was transferred to NAS Coco Solo, Panama Canal Zone, under the operational control of FAW-3. The squadron aircraft were loaded with as much of the squadron gear and personnel as possible. The remainder of the equipment, supplies and personnel were shipped aboard USS Rockaway, arriving on 8 April. Duties consisted of antishipping patrols, convoy coverage sweeps and shipping barrier patrols. On 1 June detachments were established at Salinas, Ecuador and Seymour Islands, Galapagos.
- July–August 1943: The Galapagos detachment was relieved, and a detachment was sent to NAF Portland Bight, Jamaica, British West Indies.
- 7 September 1943: A detachment was sent to Corinto, Nicaragua. The rest of the squadron joined the detachment at Corinto on 5 February 1944.
- 24 April 1944: VP-206 was relieved at Corinto, for return to NAS Key West, Florida, coming under the operational control of FAW-5. Upon arrival, the squadron began an intensive ASW refresher course. The squadron's PBM-3C aircraft were retrofitted to the S or stripped, designation—removing armor plate, gun turrets and all extraneous gear to lighten the Mariners and increase range and speed.
- 7 May 1944: The squadron received orders to transfer to NAS Quonset Point, Rhode Island, under the operational control of FAW-9. VP-206 commenced convoy coverage and patrol sweeps over the Atlantic convoy approaches to the northeastern U.S. Five PBY-5 Catalinas were added to the squadron's complement of aircraft during its stay at Quonset Point.
- 15 January 1945: VPB-206 was transferred to NAAS Elizabeth City, North Carolina, under the operational control of FAW-5. The Catalina aircraft were turned in before the transfer went into effect.
- 22 May 1945: After 30 months of operation without the loss of single aircraft, a severe hurricane struck North Carolina before any of the squadron aircraft could be flown out. Every one of the squadron's 12 aircraft at NAAS Elizabeth City were damaged, all but one severely, putting the squadron temporarily out of commission.
- 4 June 1945: VPB-206 was disestablished at NAAS Elizabeth City.

== Aircraft assignments ==
The squadron was assigned the following aircraft, effective on the dates shown:

- PBM-3 November 1942
- PBM-3C January 1943
- PBY-5 July 1943 (temporary)
- PBM-3S April 1944

== Home port assignments ==
The squadron was assigned to these home ports, effective on the dates shown:

- NAS Norfolk, Virginia 15 November 1942
- NAS Charleston, South Carolina 21 January 1943
- NAS Coco Solo, Panama Canal Zone 1 April 1943
- NAS Key West, Florida 24 April 1944
- NAS Quonset Point, Rhode Island 7 May 1944
- NAAS Elizabeth City, North Carolina 15 January 1945

== See also ==
- Maritime patrol aircraft
- List of inactive United States Navy aircraft squadrons
- List of United States Navy aircraft squadrons
- List of squadrons in the Dictionary of American Naval Aviation Squadrons
- History of the United States Navy
