= VH-4 =

VH-4 (Rescue Squadron 4) was one of six dedicated (VH) rescue squadrons of the U.S. Navy during World War II. VH-4 made 42 rescues of downed aviators, nine rescues of Filipino civilians and assisted in the rescue of another aviator. VH-4 was established in September 1944 and disestablished in November 1946. The squadron employed the Martin PBM Mariner during its operations.

== Operational history ==
- September 1944: VH-4 was established at NAS San Diego, California..
- March 1945: VH-4 commenced operations in support of the Invasion of Luzon in the Philippines. Seven survivors from two downed planes were rescued as well as nine Filipino women survivors from a capsized outrigger.
- 22 April 1945: Lt Norvell of VH-4 rescued five survivors from a downed B-25 off Formosa.
- June 1945: VH-4 relocated to Okinawa Island to join Rescue Squadron VH-3, which had been there since April. In the last two months of the war, VH-4 made 30 rescues of downed aviators and assisted in the rescue of another.
- 4 September 1945: VH-4 moved to Tokyo Bay.
- October 1945: VH-4 moved to new seadrome at Sasebo, Nagasaki.
- 1 March 1945: VH-4 detached to task force participating in Operation Crossroads atomic tests.
- November 1946: VH-4 was disestablished.

== See also ==
- VH-3 (Rescue squadron) (includes more comprehensive detail of the VH squadrons)
- Dumbo (air-sea rescue)
- Flying boat
- Air-sea rescue
- List of inactive United States Navy aircraft squadrons
