= VH-2 =

VH-2 (Rescue Squadron 2) was one of six dedicated Rescue Squadrons of the U.S. Navy during World War II. VH-2 was established in August 1944 and disestablished in November 1945. Unlike the other VH squadrons, VH-2 mostly employed the PB2B Catalina during its wartime operations. Late in the war, the PB2B Catalina was no longer used for open sea rescues, since it had proven less rugged in the open sea than its successor the Martin PBM Mariner. Thus VH-2's primary mission was to "spot" survivors in the water and direct other craft to the site to effect the rescue. On at least two occasions, VH-2 did effect rescues with open sea landings. VH-2 was credited with the initial spotting, direct rescue, or assistance in the rescue of 96 downed bomber crewman. After the war, they were assigned the Martin PBM Mariner.

== Operational history ==
- August 1944: VH-2 was established at NAS San Diego, California..
- February 1945: VH-2 commenced rescue operations from Tanapag Harbor in Saipan in support of the Invasion of Iwo Jima and B-29 strikes against Japan.
- 28 February 1945: Two VH-2 planes were deployed to Iwo Jima, operating from the USS Chincoteague (AVP-24).
- March – June 1945: VH-2 conducted 190 search, standby and spotting missions. VH-2 was credited with the initial siting of 30 survivors. VH-2 made an open sea landing to directly rescue one other (by Lt DePrato). VH-2 was also credited with assisting in the rescue of 54 additional survivors.
- 8 July 1945: VH-2 located an outrigger with three "survivors" on board who appeared disinterested and unfriendly. The USS Austin (DE-15) was dispatched to the scene and warned by the still circling VH-2 plane about the unusual behavior of the "survivors". The "survivors" revealed themselves as Japanese on a suicide mission when they threw a hand-grenade onto the deck of the ship. The destroyer opened fire and no prisoners were taken.
- 27 July 1945: A PB2B Catalina from VH-2 on a Dumbo standby mission crashed in the Philippine Sea 100 miles west of Alamagan killing seven crew members and seriously injuring three.
- July – September 1945: VH-2 conducted 116 missions in support of B-29 strikes against Japan, prisoner-of-war missions to Japan, and "ferry movement" of aircraft after the war. VH-2 spotted eleven survivors of a downed B-29 crew, rescuing six of them in an open sea landing. The other five were picked up by a surface vessel.
- 27 August 1945: The original VH-2 squadron was relieved "en masse" with six PBM-5 planes and nine new crews.
- 21 October 1945: VH-2 left Saipan and departed for NAS Alameda.
- November 1945: VH-2 was disestablished.

== See also ==
- VH-3 (Rescue squadron)
- USS Chincoteague (AVP-24)
- USS Hamlin (AV-15)
- Dumbo (air-sea rescue)
- Seaplane tender
- Flying boat
- Air-sea rescue
- List of inactive United States Navy aircraft squadrons
