= VH-5 =

VH-5 (Rescue Squadron 5) was one of six dedicated Rescue Squadrons of the U.S. Navy during WWII. A more comprehensive write-up on the VH squadrons can be found in the history of Rescue Squadron 3 (VH-3), which was the US Navy's most active VH squadron. VH-5 rescued 8 air crewman, assisted in the rescue another 2 aviators, and assisted in the capture of 4 Japanese adrift on a raft. VH-5 was established in September 1944 and disestablished in June 1946. The squadron employed the Martin PBM Mariner during its operations.

== Operational history ==
- September 1944: VH-5 was established at NAS Alameda, California.
- April 1945: VH-5 commences rescue operations headquartered out of Ebeye Island in the Kwajalein Atoll. Detachments are also stationed at Majuro and Enewetak Atoll.
- May 1945: VH-5 rescues 4 survivors from 2 downed SB2C and 1 downed F4U, assists in the rescue of another 2 survivors of a downed SB2C, and assists in the capture of 4 Japanese adrift on a raft.
- June 1945: VH-5 rescues 2 survivors from a downed SB2C from VMSB-331.
- July 1945: VH-5 rescues 2 survivors from an SB2C downed after a strike against Wotje Atoll.
- 19-28 August and 5 September 1945: VH-5 participates in the negotiations, formal surrender, and American occupation of Japanese-held Mili Atoll and Jaluit Atoll.
- June 1946: VH-5 was disestablished.

== See also ==
- Dumbo (air-sea rescue)
- Seaplane tender
- Flying boat
- Air-sea rescue
- List of inactive United States Navy aircraft squadrons
