= VH-6 =

VH-6 (Rescue Squadron 6) was one of six dedicated Rescue Squadrons of the U.S. Navy during WWII. In the final week of the war, VH-6 rescued 13 aviators off the coast of Japan. VH-6 was established in January 1945 and disestablished in February 1946. The squadron employed the Martin PBM Mariner during its operations.

== Operational history ==
- January 1945: VH-6 was established at NAS San Diego, California..
- 27 July 1945: VH-6 commences rescue operations around Okinawa, joining Rescue Squadron VH-3 which has been there since April.
- 8-10 August 1945: VH-6 rescues 13 downed aviators off Japan.
- 14 August 1945: While on a standby mission for a USAAF bomber strike, a PBM from VH-6 is harassed by three Zero Fighters. The Lockheed P-38 Lightning escort is called for assistance. In the ensuing melee, one attacking Zero is shot down and another is listed as a probable. The third Zero escapes after shooting down one of the P-38's (whose pilot does not survive).
- November–December 1945: VH-6 performs operations in the Yellow Sea.
- February 1946: VH-6 was disestablished.

== See also ==
- Dumbo (air-sea rescue)
- Seaplane tender
- Flying boat
- Air-sea rescue
- List of inactive United States Navy aircraft squadrons
