= VPB-212 =

Patrol Bombing Squadron 212
- Active: 15 March 1943 – 15 May 1946
- Country: United States of America
- Branch: United States Navy
- Type: squadron
- Role: Maritime patrol
- Engagements: World War II

Aircraft flown
- Patrol: PBM-3S/5E

VPB-212 was a Patrol Bombing Squadron of the U.S. Navy. The squadron was established as Patrol Squadron Two Hundred Twelve (VP-212) on 15 March 1943, redesignated Patrol Bombing Squadron Two Hundred Twelve (VPB-212) on 1 October 1944 and disestablished on 15 May 1946.

== Operational history ==
- 15 March–September 1943: VP-212, a medium seaplane squadron flying the PBM-3S Mariner, was established at NAS Norfolk, Virginia, under the operational control of FAW-5. Ground school and flight training continued at Norfolk through September. Since 90 percent of the flight crews had no flying experience in the PBM aircraft, most of the officers in the unit were sent to NAS Banana River, Florida, for the three-month course, while 10 percent took the shorter three-week course. On 11 August the squadron was relocated to NAAS Harvey Point, North Carolina, for shakedown. On 25 August the squadron was sent to the AsDevLant at NAS Quonset Point, Rhode Island, for advanced training in Anti-submarine warfare (ASW) and use of radar. The squadron returned to NAAS Harvey Point on 10 September for completion of flight training.
- 24 September 1943: The squadron suffered its first operational losses when Lieutenant William J. Walker, the squadron executive officer, and five members of his crew were killed in a crash while attempting a night landing at NAAS Harvey Point in stormy weather.
- 30 September 1943: VP-212 was transferred to NS San Juan, Puerto Rico, under the operational control of FAW-11. Duties at this location consisted of convoy coverage and ASW sweeps. A detachment was maintained at NAF Antigua, British West Indies. The primary function of the squadron was to block U-boats from entering the Caribbean convoy routes. Sweeps were flown north and south of Mona Passage and north and south of Anegada Passage.
- 17 December 1943: Lieutenant H. M. Whaling and crew were providing night convoy coverage for transports en route to Curaçao, Netherlands West Indies, when they approached what they believed to be one of the escort vessels. As it turned out, they had approached a surfaced U-boat and were driven off by intense anti-aircraft fire before an attack run could be made. Although not successful in sinking the submarine, the aircraft did interrupt the firing plot the U-boat commander was preparing to execute on the Spanish tanker Campestra.
- 1 April 1944: Lieutenant (jg) G. R. Gregory and crew attacked a surfaced U-boat northeast of Puerto Rico in broad daylight. Although a perfect straddle of depth charges was made, damage was assessed as minimal. The Sonobuoys dropped on the second run had failed to work due to dead batteries, a recurrent problem in the tropics.
- 27 May 1944: The squadron was relocated to NAF Port of Spain, Trinidad, British West Indies, with a detachment maintained at NAF Esquibo, British Guyana. In August, continuous coverage of convoy traffic was discontinued. One unusual duty assigned the squadron during this period was searching for U.S. Navy mines that had broken loose from their moorings and drifted into the shipping lanes. USS Pelican served as the advanced base at NAF Paramaribo and NAF Esquibo, British Guyana, until relieved by USS Thrush in November 1944.
- 12 January 1945: VPB-212 was relocated back to NS San Juan, with a detachment maintained at NAS Guantanamo Bay, Cuba.
- 4 April 1945: VPB-212 was transferred to NAS Quonset Point, under the operational control of FAW-9, relieving VPB-84. Duties at this location consisted of convoy coverage and ASW sweeps. These activities were discontinued with the receipt of a dispatch on 21 May and training flights only were scheduled.
- 30 May–June 1945: VPB-212 began transferring its aircraft in sections of four to NAAS Harvey Point, coming under the operational control of FAW-5. Upon arrival of the last crew on 4 June the entire squadron was given home leave through the 15th. Upon return, the squadron was issued new PBM-5E aircraft. A period of reforming and retraining in navigation, communications and recognition began. Day and night familiarization hops were flown, and target practice on gunnery sleeves was conducted.
- 19 July–13 August 1945: VPB-212 was transferred to NAS Norfolk. When the last of the squadron's three sections arrived on 24 July, all of the squadron personnel were granted leave through 13 August.
- 25 August 1945–March 1946: VPB-212 was transferred to NAS Alameda, California, under the operational control of FAW-8. On 27 August the squadron was sent to NAS Whidbey Island, Washington, on temporary duty. The squadron had barely begun training when the war ended and orders were received to begin demobilizing officers immediately, leaving inexperienced personnel to carry on. New replacement crews were often demobilized before they reached operational capability. The situation did not improve until March 1946, when 10 crews were certified as ready for operations.
- 15 May 1946: VPB-212 was disestablished at NAS Whidbey Island.

== Aircraft assignments ==
The squadron was assigned the following aircraft, effective on the dates shown:

- PBM-3S March 1943
- PBM-5E May 1945

== Home port assignments ==
The squadron was assigned to these home ports, effective on the dates shown:

- NAS Norfolk, Virginia 15 March 1943
- NAAS Harvey Point, North Carolina 11 August 1943
- NS San Juan, Puerto Rico 30 September 1943
- NAF Port of Spain, Trinidad, British West Indies 27 May 1944
- NS San Juan, 12 January 1945
- NAS Quonset Point, Rhode Island 4 April 1945
- NAAS Harvey Point, 30 May 1945
- NAS Norfolk, 19 Jul 1945
- NAS Alameda, California 25 August 1945
- NAS Whidbey Island, Washington 27 August 1945

== See also ==
- Maritime patrol aircraft
- List of inactive United States Navy aircraft squadrons
- List of United States Navy aircraft squadrons
- List of squadrons in the Dictionary of American Naval Aviation Squadrons
- History of the United States Navy
