= 1946 Antarctica PBM Mariner crash =

1946 aviation accident

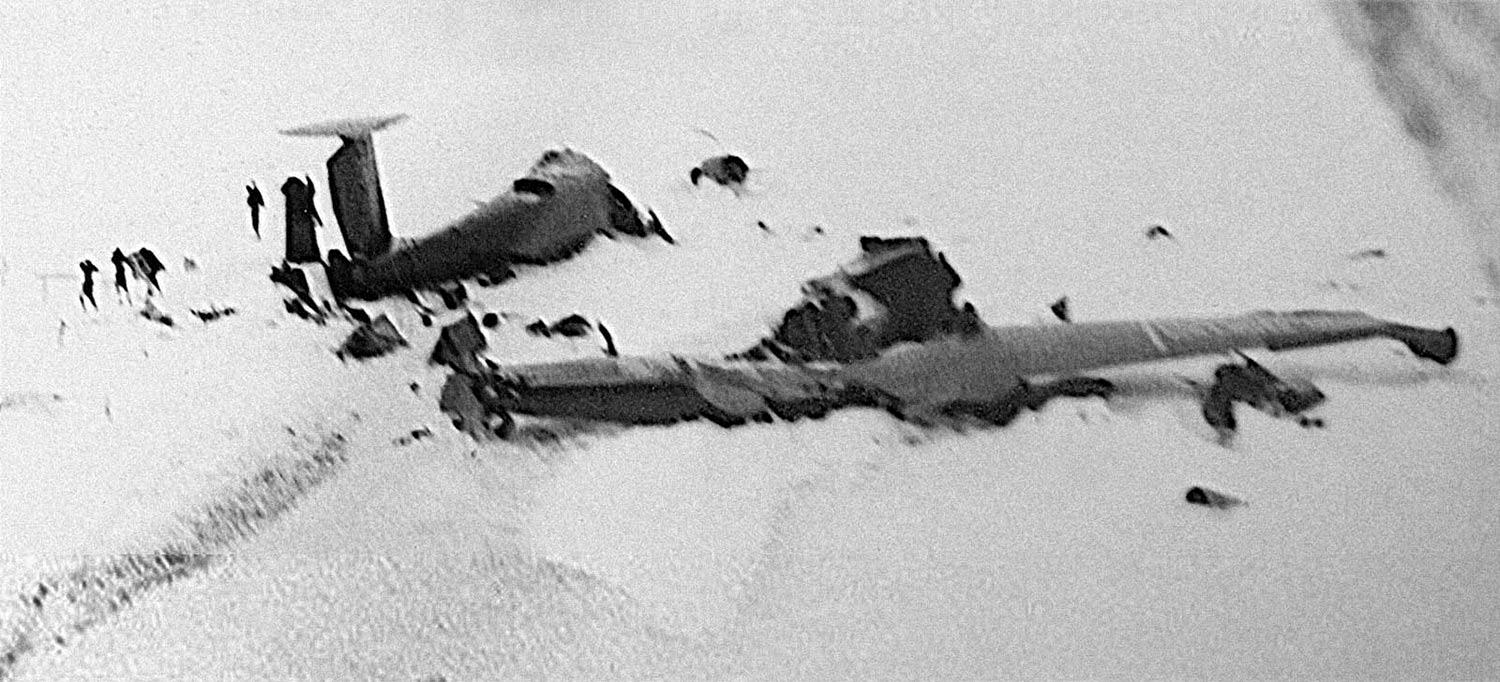
- Wreckage and survivors of the crash photographed on 11 January 1947

Accident
- Date: 30 December 1946 - 12 January 1947
- Summary: Severe weather
- Site: Thurston Island, Antarctica; 71°23′S 98°45′W

Aircraft
- Aircraft type: Martin PBM Mariner
- Operator: United States Navy
- Registration: 59098
- Crew: 9
- Fatalities: 3
- Survivors: 6

The 1946 Antarctica PBM Mariner crash occurred on 30 December 1946, on Thurston Island, Antarctica when a United States Navy Martin PBM-5 Mariner crashed during a blizzard. Buno 59098 was one of 4 aircraft lost during Operation Highjump.

== The crash ==
The aircraft based from USS Pine Island (AV-12), Bureau Number 59098, callsign "George 1", hit a ridge and burned while supporting Operation Highjump. The crash instantly killed Ensign Maxwell A. Lopez and Petty Officer Wendell K. Hendersin. Two hours later, Petty Officer Frederick Williams also died. Six crewmembers survived the crash, Aviation Radioman James H. Robbins, pilot Ralph "Frenchy" LeBlanc, co-pilot William Kearns, photographer Owen McCarty, Plane Captain J.D. Dickens, and Pine Island Captain H.H. Caldwell, a guest observer on the flight. They were rescued 13 days later by an aircraft from Pine Island. LeBlanc was so frostbitten from the conditions that both of his legs were amputated to avoid gangrene spreading past his knee joints. His legs were amputated on the Philippine Sea, a ship that was part of the rescue, and one of his arms was later surgically grafted to his face to repair frostbitten facial tissue in a Rhode Island naval hospital. Hendersin, Williams, and Lopez were buried at the crash site and their remains have not been recovered.

In 2004, during a surveying flight, a Chilean navy airplane flew over the site using ground penetrating radar to discover the exact location. A two-expedition recovery mission was planned, but subsequently cancelled, for both November 2008 and November 2009 to recover the three fatalities of the crash from their temporary grave. In 2012, another group announced plans to drill 100 ft (30 m) down to recover the bodies. Rich Lopez, nephew of Maxwell Lopez, was part of the plan. However the group struggled to raise the $1.5-3.5 million dollars they would need.

== See also ==
- List of Antarctica disasters by death toll
