= VPB-211 =

Patrol Bombing Squadron 211
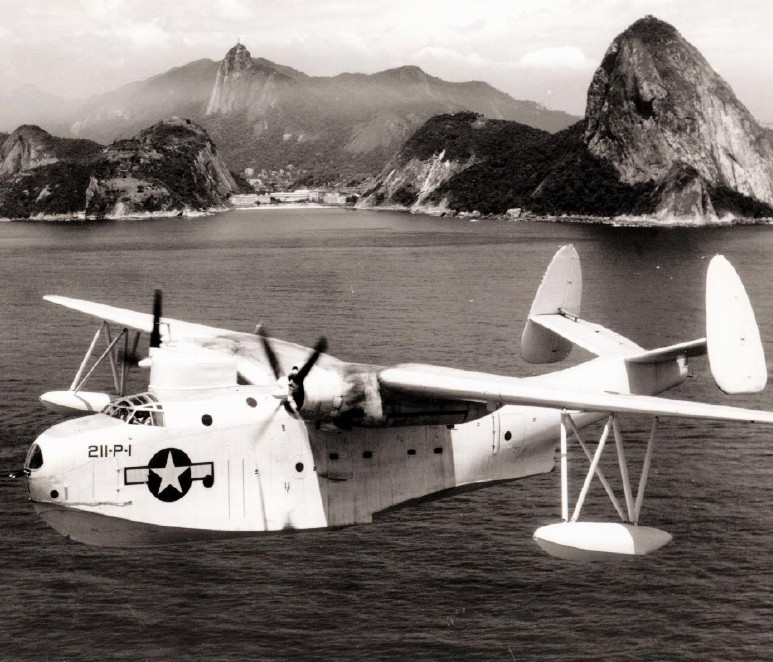
- VP-211 PBM-3S off Brazil c.1944
- Active: 15 February 1943 – 14 June 1945
- Country: United States of America
- Branch: United States Navy
- Type: Maritime patrol squadron
- Role: Maritime patrol
- Engagements: World War II

Aircraft flown
- Patrol: PBM-3

VPB-211 was a Patrol Bombing Squadron of the U.S. Navy. The squadron was established as Patrol Squadron Two Hundred Eleven (VP-211) on 15 February 1943, redesignated Patrol Bombing Squadron Two Hundred Eleven (VPB-211) on 1 October 1944 and disestablished on 14 June 1945.

== Operational history ==
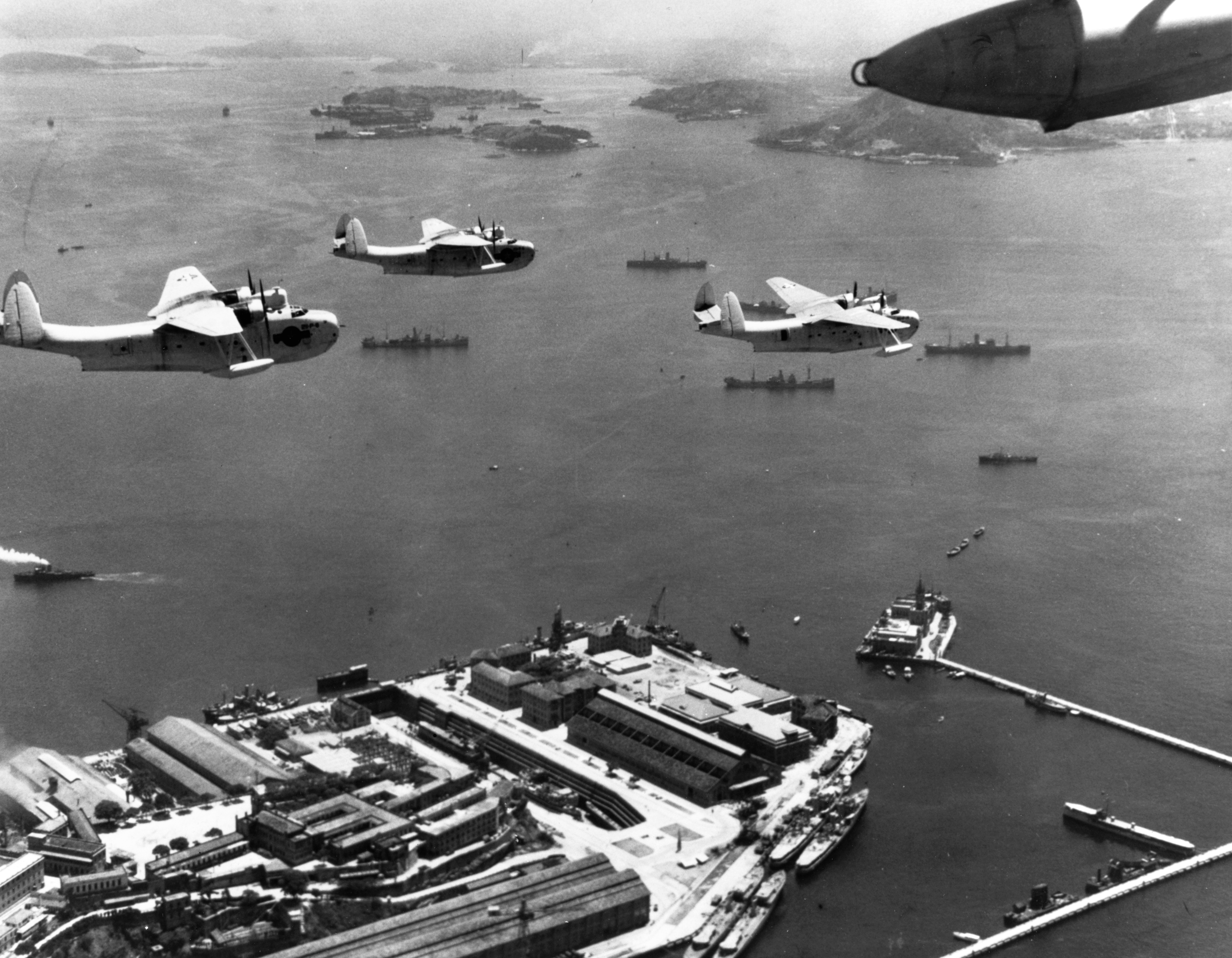
VPB-211 PBM-3s over Rio de Janeiro in December 1943

- 15 February 1943: VP-211 was established at NAS Norfolk, Virginia, as a medium seaplane squadron flying the PBM-3C Mariner under the operational control of FAW-5. Training continued at Norfolk through May. Shakedown training was conducted at NAAS Elizabeth City, North Carolina, commencing on 21 May 1943.
- 7 August 1943: Lieutenant (jg) E. C. Scully and crew attacked and damaged a surfaced U-boat off the coast near Elizabeth City. On the first and second bomb run, the bomb release malfunctioned. By the third bombing run the submarine was below the surface. The manual release was used and the U-boat was blown back to the surface. Lieutenant (jg) Scully made several strafing passes on the damaged submarine, but one after another of his aircraft's machine guns froze up until only the tail gun, firing single shots, remained. By this time the heavy anti-aircraft fire from the U-boat had severely damaged the hull of the Mariner. Scully was forced to leave the area before leaking fuel tanks forced him down. He managed to land safely and beach the aircraft on a spit of sand before it sank.
- 25 August 1943: A detachment of eight crews was sent to NAS Quonset Point, Rhode Island, for advanced Anti-submarine warfare (ASW) warfare training at AsDevLant, returning on 25 September.
- 27 September 1943: VP-211 received orders to deploy to NAF Aratu, Bahia, Brazil. The squadron's last section of four aircraft arrived at Aratu on 16 October and relieved VP-74, coming under the operational control of FAW-16. VP-211 became a part of Task Force 44, an integral part of the Fourth Fleet. A detachment of six aircraft was maintained at Governor's Island, NAF Galeão, Rio de Janeiro, Brazil, due to the distance of Aratu from the "slot" where U-boat hunting was so abundant. The slot was the area where the U-boats traversed the Atlantic from north to south via a regular route. On 12 November the squadron shifted its headquarters to Galeão for a three-month period, leaving a three-aircraft detachment at Aratu. NAF Galeão, while nearer to the hunting area, had primitive living conditions and frequently was shrouded in early morning fog. The squadron's first searchlight mission was conducted in February, and from that time on, nearly all of the squadron's patrols were conducted at night.
- January 1944: The squadron's 14 to 16 hour patrols began to take their toll on the aircraft. Maintenance facilities in the area were very basic, so engine changes were made at sea off Florianópolis, Brazil. Engine changes were made in four sections of three aircraft each, with one Mariner undergoing the change, while the second stood by to assist in the maintenance, with the third hauling supplies, gasoline, personnel and food.
- 12 January 1944: The squadron suffered its first operational loss during a training exercise when Ensign Thomas E. Donahue and crew P-8 dropped a depth charge from too low an altitude. The munitions exploded near the tail, causing the plane to crash and burn. Crew P-4 landed immediately and rescued five critically injured survivors from the water.
- 10 June 1944: VP-211 was relocated to NAF Natal, Brazil, the equal of Galeao in terms of primitive living conditions. In addition, the operating area of the seaplane base at NAF Parnamirim Field was located on the Potengy River 18 miles (29 km) down river from the crews’ quarters. The primary duties while at this location consisted of barrier sweeps, which were plots predicated on the relative movement of German submarines conducted at distances approximately 800 miles (1,300 km) from base.
- 28 September 1944: Crew P-4 located a surfaced U-boat by radar and was driven off by the heavy anti-aircraft fire before an attack could be made. An accurate fix on the location of the submarine was made, and on 29 September two VB-107 aircraft flown by Lieutenants E. A. Krug and J. T. Burton made a coordinated attack on U-863. The U-boat was found in the same vicinity as the sighting made by VP-211 on the previous day. The sinking was confirmed by postwar review of enemy records.
- 29 September 1944: VP-211 was reduced in size from 12 aircraft to 9; these aircraft and personnel were sent to join VPB-98 at NAS Corpus Christi, Texas.
- 21 November 1944: The squadron's second operational loss occurred when Lieutenant Robert H. Lind and crew P-2, while on patrol between Natal and Aratu, encountered a violent thunderstorm and crashed into the sea, losing all hands.
- January 1945: VPB-211 was temporarily based aboard USS Matagorda at Bahia Bay to assist in the training of the ship's crew in handling seaplanes at advanced bases.
- February 1945: VPB-211 was temporarily based aboard USS Rehoboth at Bahia Bay to assist in the training of the ship's crew in handling seaplanes at advanced bases.
- 1–31 March 1945: The squadron was temporarily based aboard USS Rockaway for advanced base training.
- April 1945: VPB-211 was based aboard USS Humboldt at Bahia Bay to assist in the training of the ship's crew in handling seaplanes at advanced bases.
- 16 May 1945: Convoy patrols were discontinued. On 24 May orders were received to turn over the squadron's aircraft to HEDRON-11 at NS San Juan, Puerto Rico, and proceed to NAS Norfolk for disestablishment.
- 14 Jun 1945: VPB-211 was disestablished at NAS Norfolk.

== Aircraft assignments ==
The squadron was assigned the following aircraft, effective on the dates shown:

- PBM-3 May 1943
- PBM-3S June 1943

== Home port assignments ==
The squadron was assigned to these home ports, effective on the dates shown:

- NAS Norfolk, Virginia 15 February 1943
- NAAS Elizabeth City, North Carolina 21 May 1943
- NAF Aratu, Bahia, Brazil 27 September 1943
- NAF Galeão, Brazil 12 November 1943
- NAF Aratu, January 1944
- NAF Natal, Brazil 10 June 1944
- Bahia Bay, Brazil 1 January 1945
- NAS Norfolk, 24 May 1945

== See also ==
- Maritime patrol aircraft
- List of inactive United States Navy aircraft squadrons
- List of United States Navy aircraft squadrons
- List of squadrons in the Dictionary of American Naval Aviation Squadrons
- History of the United States Navy
