= VPB-99 =

Patrol Bombing Squadron 99
- Active: 5 January 1945 – 15 January 1946
- Country: United States of America
- Branch: United States Navy
- Type: squadron
- Role: Maritime patrol

Aircraft flown
- Patrol: PBM-3D/5D

VPB-99 was a Patrol Bombing Squadron of the U.S. Navy. The squadron was established as Patrol Bombing Squadron 99 (VPB-99) on 5 January 1945 and disestablished on 15 January 1946.

== Operational history ==
- 5 January 1945: VPB-99 was established at NAS Alameda, California, as a PBM training squadron under the operational control of FAW-8. The mission of the squadron was to complete the training of PBM replacement crews that had finished the basic course at NAAS Banana River, Florida, or NAS Corpus Christi, Texas. The sister squadron to this unit was VPB-98 at NAS San Diego, California.
- 1 May – 31 July 1945: Between 19 and 30 crews per month were ferried to NAS Kaneohe Bay, Hawaii, upon completion of the course syllabus. This ceased with the end of combat patrols after 10 August and the Surrender of Japan.
- September 1945: Personnel were reorganized in the squadron to permit rapid demobilization of those who could be spared.
- 15 January 1946: VPB-99 was disestablished at NAS Alameda.

== Aircraft assignments ==
The squadron was assigned the following aircraft, effective on the dates shown:

- PBM-3D - January 1945
- PBM-5D - January 1945

== Home port assignments ==
The squadron was assigned to these home ports, effective on the dates shown:

- NAS Alameda, California - 5 January 1945

== See also ==
- Maritime patrol aircraft
- List of inactive United States Navy aircraft squadrons
- List of United States Navy aircraft squadrons
- List of squadrons in the Dictionary of American Naval Aviation Squadrons
- History of the United States Navy
