= Martin PBM Mariner =

American patrol bomber flying boat

PBM Mariner
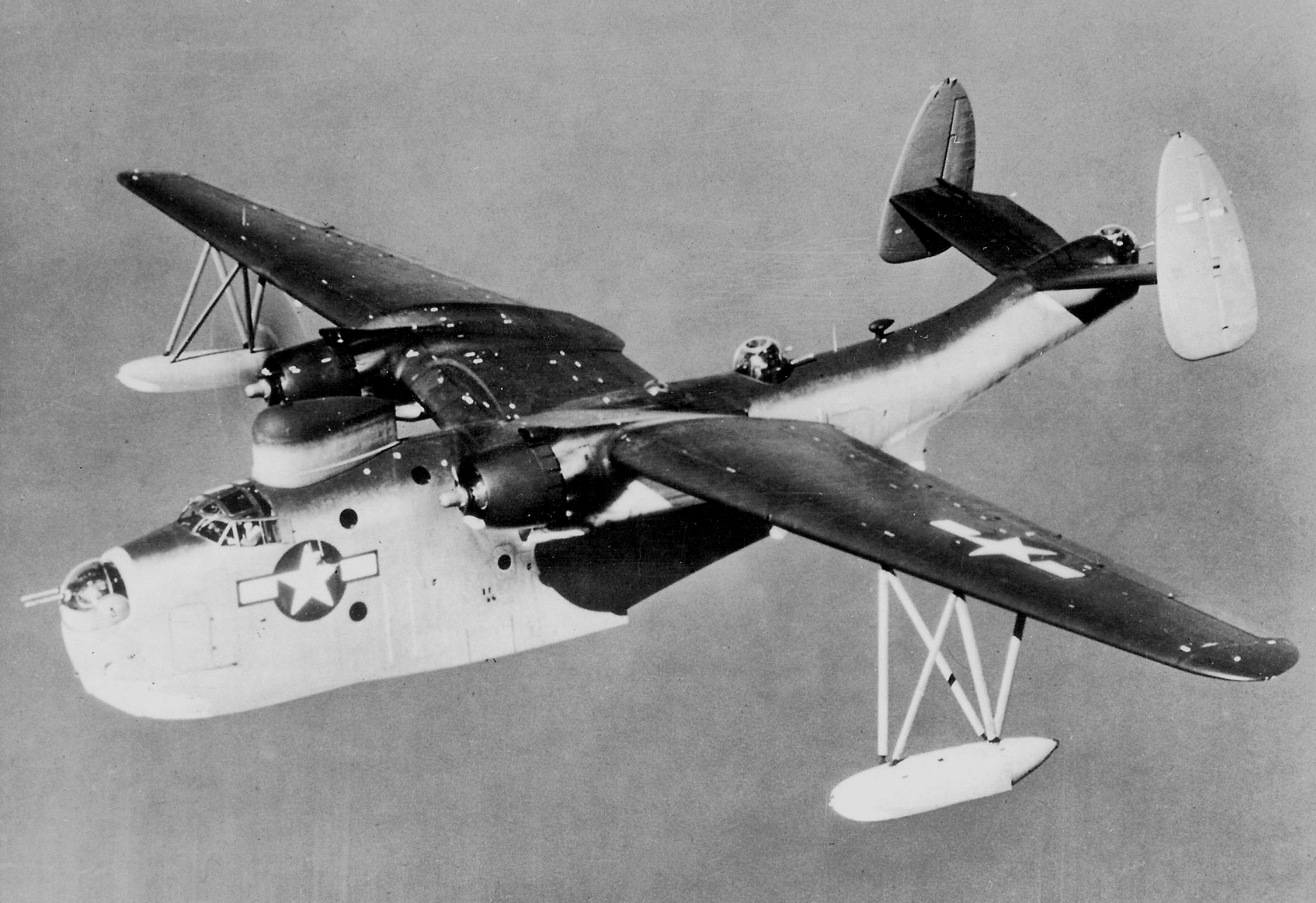
- A U.S. Navy PBM-5 Mariner

General information
- Type: Patrol bomber flying boat
- National origin: United States
- Manufacturer: Glenn L. Martin Company
- Primary users: United States Navy United States Coast Guard; Royal Australian Air Force; Argentine Navy
- Number built: 1,366

History
- Manufactured: 1940–1949
- Introduction date: September 1940
- First flight: 18 February 1939
- Retired: 1964 (Uruguay)
- Developed into: Martin P5M Marlin

The Martin PBM Mariner is a twin-engine patrol bomber flying boat designed and produced by the American aircraft manufacturer Glenn L. Martin Company. It was active during both the World War II and the early Cold War era.

Developed during the late 1930s, the Mariner was designed to complement the Consolidated PBY Catalina and PB2Y Coronado then in service with the United States Navy (US Navy). To prove the company's performance projections in the face of scepticism, Martin produced a three-eighths scale flying model, the Martin 162A, in addition to the full-scale prototype, designated XPBM-1. Unusually, the US Navy opted to place an initial production order for the type prior to completion of this prototype, which performed its maiden flight on 18 February 1939. The Mariner entering service with the US Navy in September 1940; it was the principal customer for the type, of which 1,366 flying boats were built. In addition to the US Navy, various other operators for the type emerged, including the United States Coast Guard, Royal Australian Air Force, and the Argentine Navy.

Initially used by the US Navy to conduct Neutrality Patrols in the Atlantic, Mariners commenced anti-submarine patrols following Japan's attack on Pearl Harbor, resulting in the type being credited with the sinking of numerous U-boats. It was used heavily during Pacific War, operating from locations such as Saipan, Okinawa, Iwo Jima, and the South West Pacific. The United States Coast Guard also used Mariners during the conflict, acting as the backbone of the service's long-range aerial search and rescue efforts into the mid-1950s. The US Navy deployed its Mariners during the Korean Wars, where it performed long patrol missions. Several examples were lost on operations, such as while searching for Flight 19 in 5 December 1945 and amid a blizzard in Antarctica in December 1946. Furthermore, an enlarged four-engined derivative of the Mariner, the Martin JRM Mars, would also see small-scale production and adoption by the service.

During the mids 1950s, the US Navy opted to withdraw the Mariner in favour of newer types, such as the Martin P5M Marlin and the Grumman HU-16 Albatross. Several surplus flying boats were acquired by other operators and saw use for a time, such as the Royal Netherlands Navy deploying the type in Netherlands New Guinea up to 1959. The final operator of the type, the National Navy of Uruguay, withdrew its last Mariners in 1964. Only one fully-intact example has been preserved.

== Design and development ==
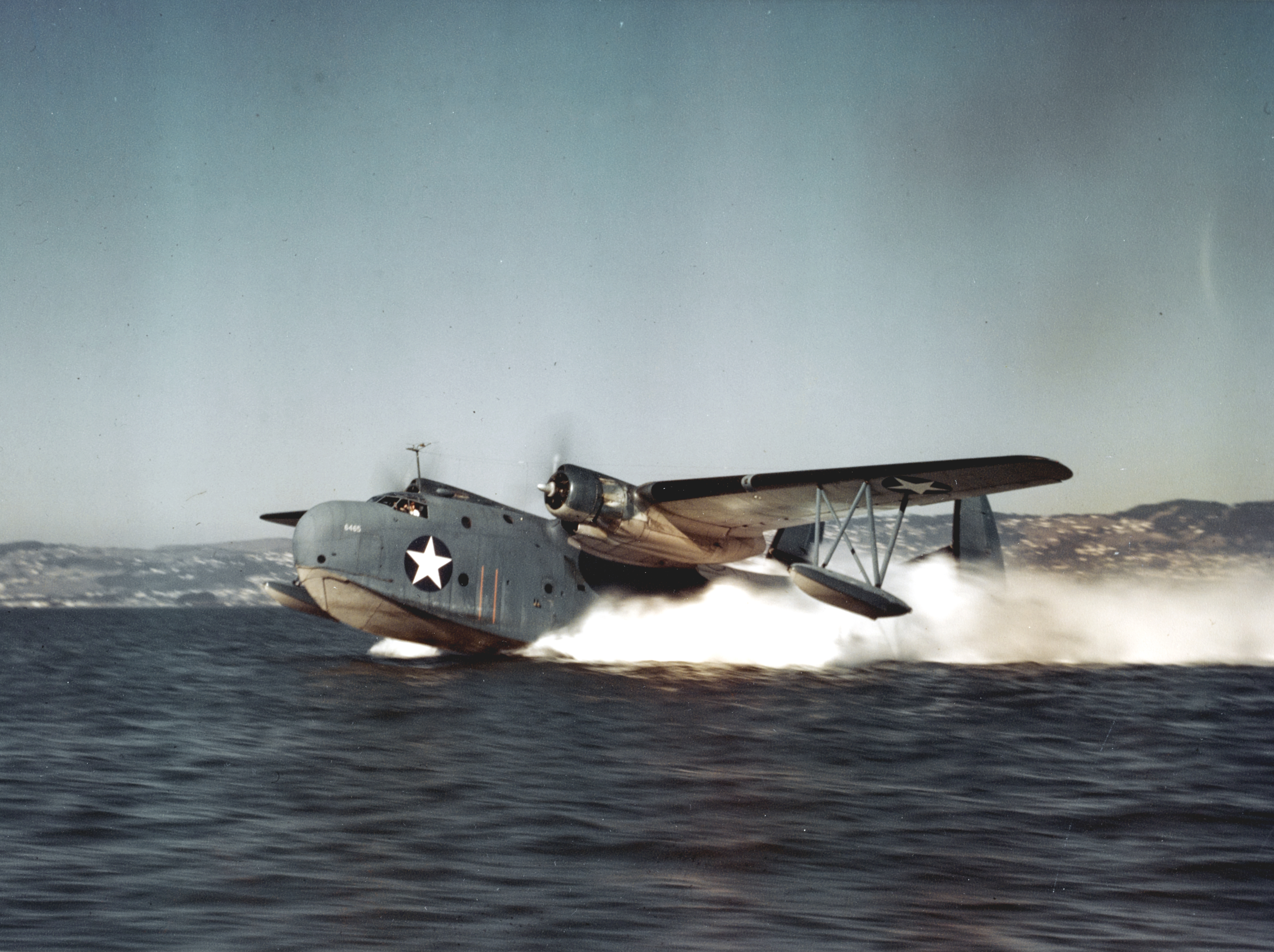
A transport Mariner takes off in 1942

The origins of the PBM Mariner can be traced back to 1936 and the Model 160, a proposed four-engined flying boat designed by the Glenn L. Martin Company. After the Model 160 was rejected by the Bureau of Aeronautics of the United States Navy (US Navy) due to a stated preference for twin-engined flying boats, the company's design team promptly produced a closely-related twin-engined flying boat, internally designated as the Model 162. Martin contrasted their new design against the popular Consolidated PBY Catalina, claiming that the Model 162 would be 20 percent faster than the Catalina while possessing double the range and payload. In response to these claims, Consolidated Aircraft threatened legal action and disputed their accuracy. This controversy led to Martin building a three-eighths scale flying model, the Martin 162A Tadpole Clipper, operated by a crew of one and powered by a single 120 hp (89 kW) Chevrolet engine driving two airscrews via v-belts; first flown in December 1937, it quickly validated Martin's performance projections.

On 30 June 1937, the US Navy placed an order for a single prototype, designated XPBM-1. A combination of the strong performance of the Martin 162A scale model and an urgent desire for more maritime patrol platforms in light of the declining political situation in Europe convinced US Navy officials to not wait for the completion of the this prototype, thus an initial production order for 21 PBM-1 flying boats was place by the service on 28 December 1937. The first full-scale PBM, designated XPBM-1, conducted its maiden flight on 18 February 1939. During the subsequent production run, a total of 1,235 Mariners were completed.

The design of the Mariner had numerous differences from the competing Catalina, such as its use of a relatively deep hull and the mounting of a gull wing, the combination of which kept the flying boat's radial engines out of the salty sea spray without resorting to a parasol wing and thus avoiding the accompanying external bracing. Instead of external mounting of bombs, the Mariner featured internal bomb bays that permitted higher speeds to be attained when the flying boat was carrying ordnance. These bomb bays, which were located within the engine nacelles, were capable of accommodating up to 5,200 pounds of bombs; torpedoes could also be carried. The exterior of the Mariner was streamlined which, combined with the fitting of two Wright R-2600-6 14-cylinder radial engines that could produce up to 1,600 hp, resulted in the flying boat possessing a persistent speed advantage over the lighter Catalina. Production Mariners were outfitted with an upwards-canted horizontal stabilizer, an arrangement which gave the twin vertical stabilizers an inward tilt and thus a relatively distinctive appearance.

In in terms of defensive armaments, the Mariner featured multiple gun positions, including single mounts at each midship beam and stern above the tail cone, while additional guns were positioned in the nose and dorsal turrets, each fitted with two-gun turrets. The gull wing was of cantilever design, and featured clean aerodynamics with an unbraced twin tail. To reduce drag, the PBM-1 was equipped with retractable wing landing floats that were hinged outboard, with single-strut supported floats that retracted inwards to rest beneath the wing, with the floats' keels just outboard of each of the engine nacelles. The PBM-3 had fixed floats, and the fuselage was three feet longer than that of the PBM-1. Furthermore, the type was commonly equipped with AN/APS-15 radar.

During the late 1930s, Martin developed an enlarged four-engined derivative of the Mariner, which would ultimately be produced only in small numbers as the Martin JRM Mars.

== Operational history ==
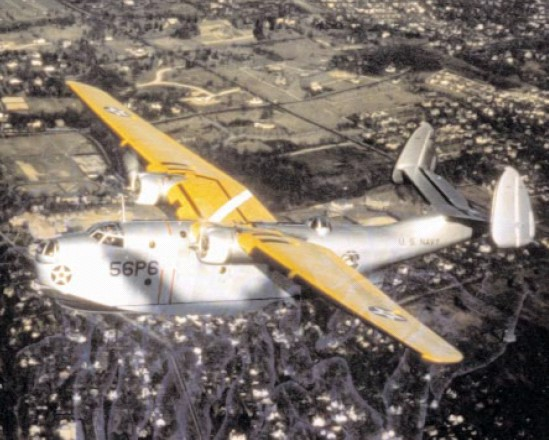
A U.S. Navy PBM-1 of Patrol Squadron 56 (VP-56) in 1940.

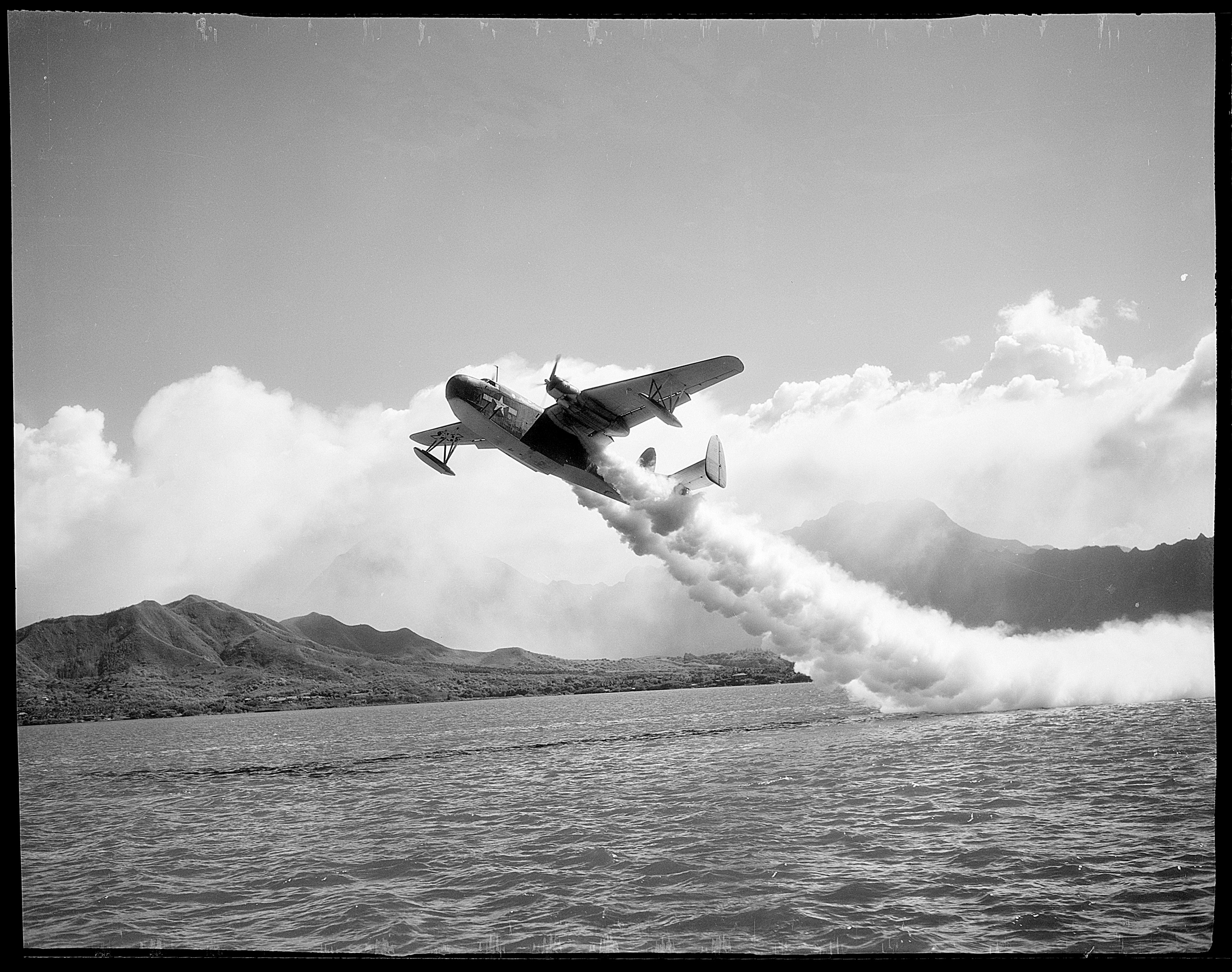
PBM JATO October 1944

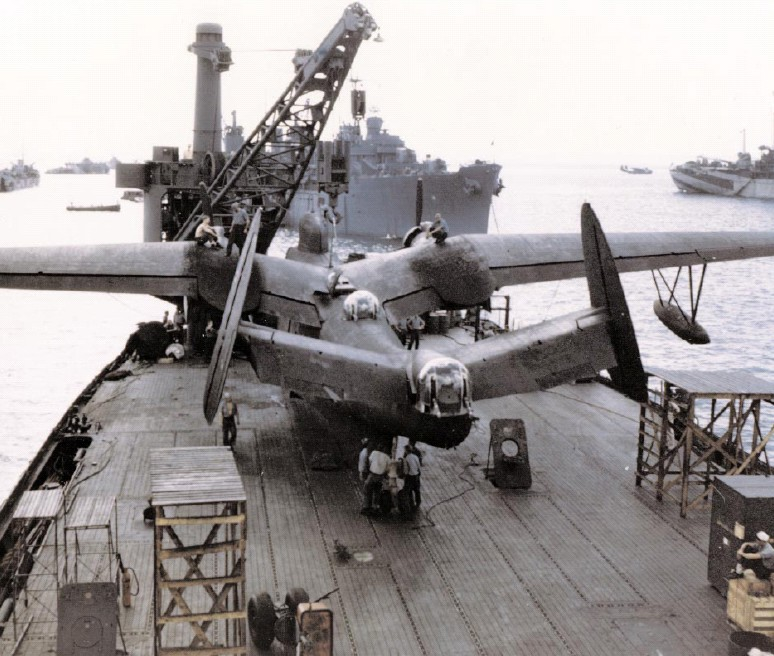
A PBM-5 on the deck of USS Norton Sound in April 1945 off Saipan

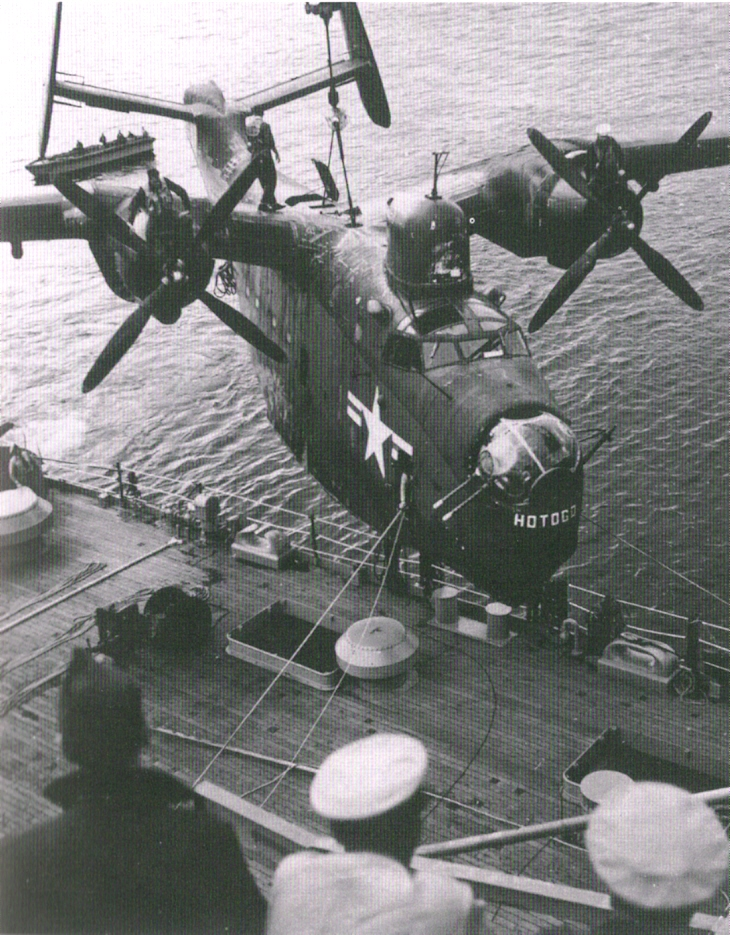
A U.S. Navy PBM of Fleet Air Wing 6 is hoisted aboard the seaplane tender USS Curtiss (AV-4) after a mine-hunting patrol off North Korea during the Korean War (1950-1953).

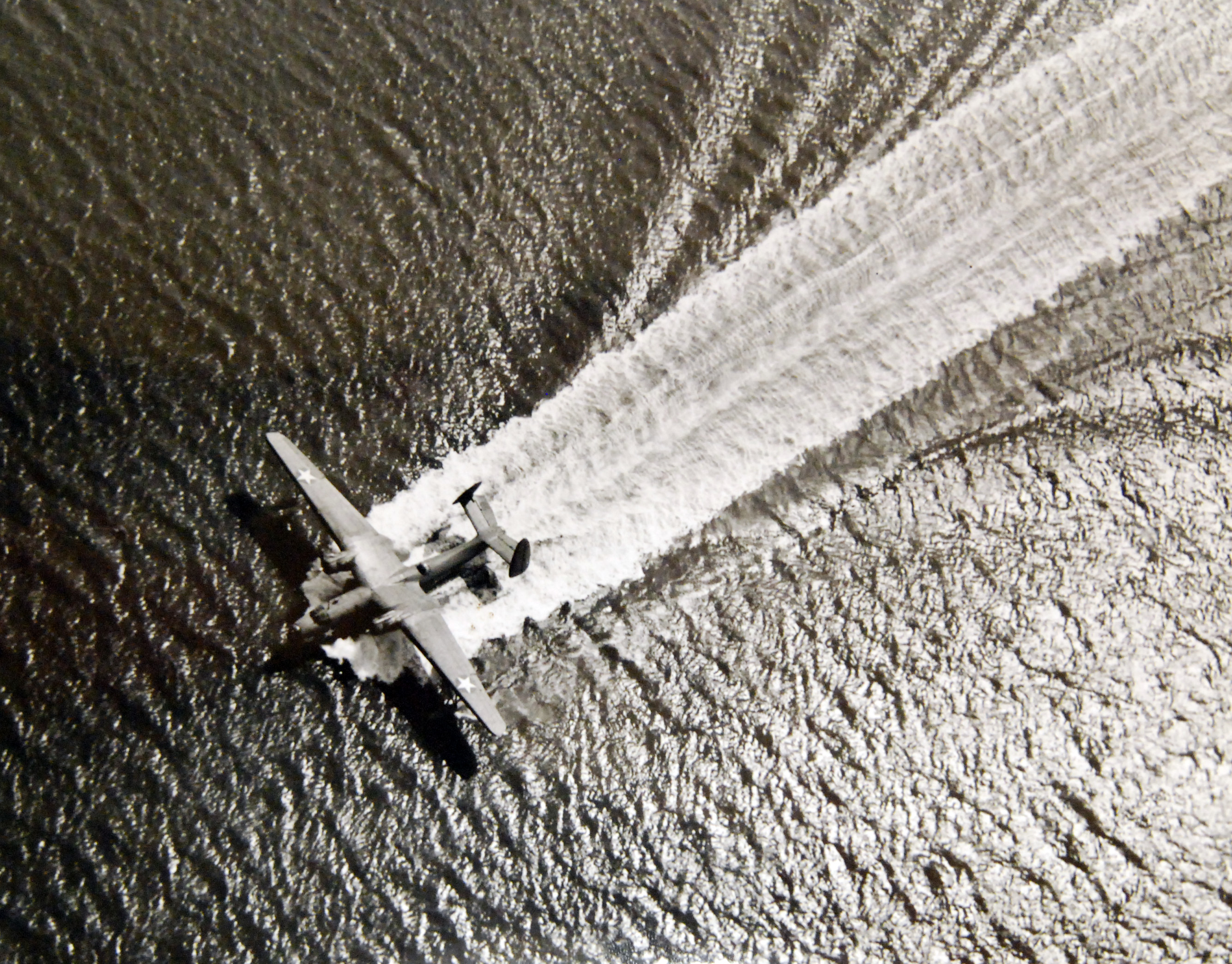
PBM Mariner leaves a wake (August 1943)

The first PBM-1s entered service with Patrol Squadron Fifty-Five (VP-55) of the United States Navy on 1 September 1940. Prior to the entry of the United States into World War II in December 1941, PBMs were used (together with PBYs) to carry out Neutrality Patrols in the Atlantic, including operations from Iceland. Following Japan's attack on Pearl Harbor, PBMs were used on anti-submarine patrols, sinking their first German U-boat, U-158, on 30 June 1942. PBMs were responsible, wholly or in part, for sinking a total of ten U-boats during World War II. PBMs were also heavily used in the Pacific War, operating from bases at Saipan, Okinawa, Iwo Jima, and the South West Pacific.

Towards the end of the conflict, the threat posed by submarines diminished substantially; in response, Mariners were redirected towards other combat operations, including night time raids against Japanese shipping, the bombing of enemy shore installations across numerous Pacific islands and on mainland Japan. Furthermore, by means of its defensive turrets, the type claimed the downing of several Japanese fighters. In early 1945, the type was deployed in quantity in support of the Invasion of Okinawa, throughout the operation, Mariners frequently performed anti-shipping strikes against enemy convoys and rescued the downed aircrews of Boeing B-29 Superfortresses and various carrier aircraft.

The United States Coast Guard acquired 27 Martin PBM-3 during the first half of 1943. In late 1944, the service acquired 41 PBM-5 models and more were delivered in the latter half of 1945. Ten flying boats were still in service in 1955, although all were gone from the active Coast Guard inventory by 1958 (when the last example was released from CGAS San Diego and returned to the U.S. Navy). These flying boats became the backbone of the long-range aerial search and rescue efforts of the Coast Guard in the early post-war years until supplanted by the P5M Marlin and the HU-16 Albatross in the mid-1950s.

PBMs continued in service with the US Navy following the end of World War II, flying long patrol missions during the Korean War. It continued in front line use until replaced by its successor, the P5M Marlin. The last Navy squadron equipped with the PBM, Patrol Squadron Fifty (VP-50), retired them in July 1956.

The British Royal Air Force acquired 32 Mariners, but they were not used operationally due to a preference for another flying boat, the Short Sunderland; several were subsequently transferred to the US States Navy. A further 12 PBM-3Rs were transferred to the Royal Australian Air Force for transporting troops and cargo.

The Royal Netherlands Navy acquired 17 PBM-5A Mariners at the end of 1955 for service in Netherlands New Guinea. The PBM-5A was an amphibian with retractable landing gear. The engines were 2,100 hp (1,600 kW) Pratt & Whitney R-2800-34. After a series of crashes, the Dutch withdrew their remaining aircraft from use in December 1959.

== Variants ==
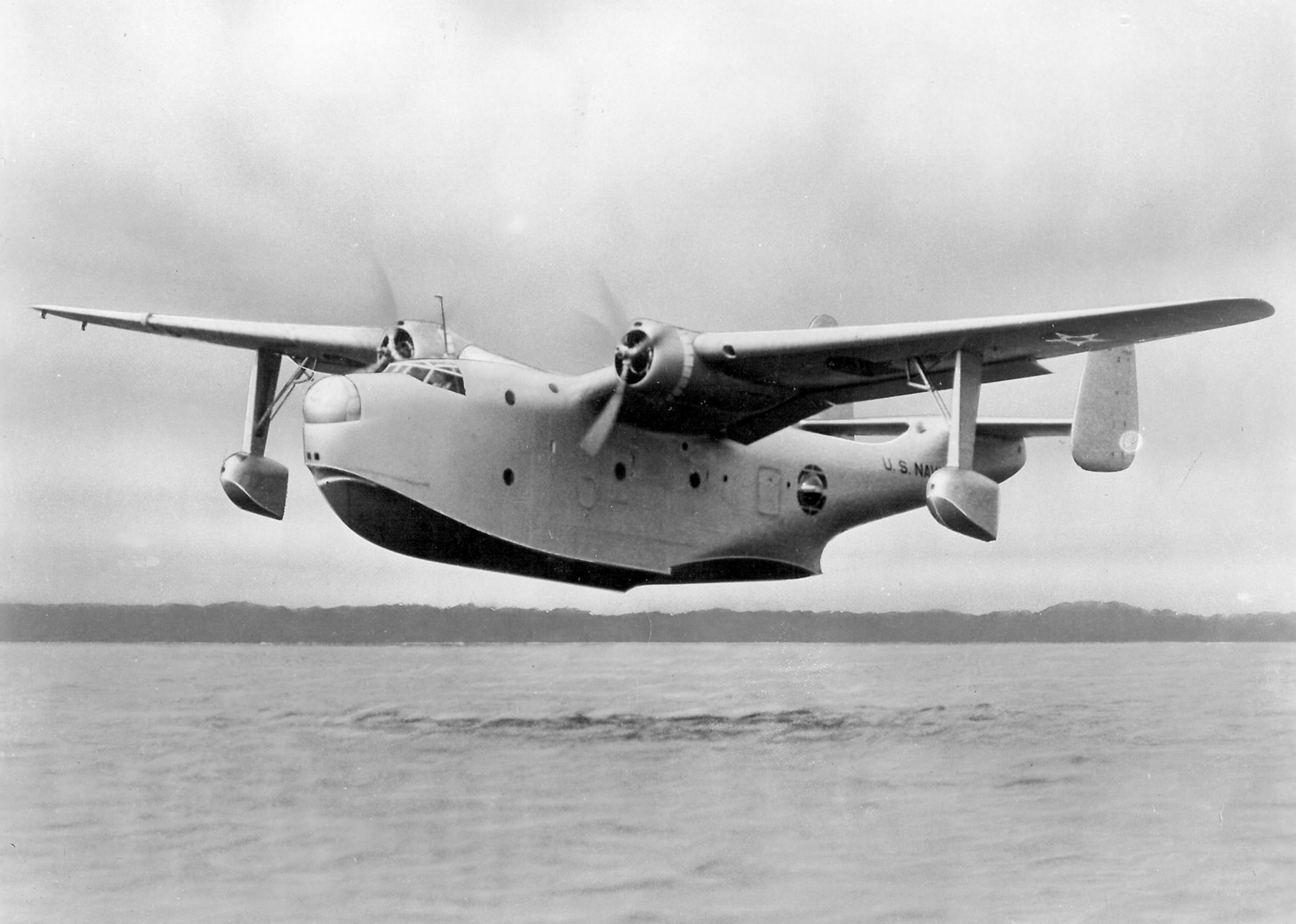
The XPBM-1 showing the original retractable floats.

XPBM-1 (Model 162)
Prototype. Powered by two 1,600 hp (1,194 kW) R-2600-6 engines.
PBM-1 (Model 162)
Initial production version. 5× .50 inch (12.7 mm) machine guns. Two R-2600-6 engines; 21 built.
XPBM-2 (Model 162)
Conversion of one PBM-1 as experimental catapult-launched long-range strategic bomber.
PBM-3 (Model 162B)
Improved version. 1,700 hp (1,270 kW) R-2600-12 engines; 32 built.
PBM-3R (Model 162B)
Unarmed transport version of PBM-3. 18 new build plus 31 converted from PBM-3.
PBM-3C (Model 162C)
Improved patrol version with twin .50 in machine guns in nose and dorsal turrets, and single guns in tail turret and waist positions. AN/APS-15 radar in radome behind cockpit; 274 built.
PBM-3B (Model 162C)
Designation for ex-RAF Mariner GR.1A after return to U.S. Navy.
PBM-3S (Model 162C)
Dedicated anti-submarine aircraft with reduced armament and weight for improved range. Six were prototyped from the PBM-3C with radar and standard armament less the dorsal turret. Later a light weight nose armament was fitted (2× fixed 0.50 in machine guns in nose. Retained were single machine gun in port waist position.; 62 conversions plus 94 built as new plus .
PBM-3D (Model 162D)
Patrol bomber with increased power (two 1,900 hp (1,417 kW) R-2600-22s) and increased armament (twin 0.50 in machine guns in nose, dorsal, and tail turrets, plus two waist guns). 259 built.
PBM-4 (Model 162E)
Proposed version with two 2,700 hp (2,015 kW) Wright R-3350 engines; unbuilt.
PBM-5 (Model 162F)
Version with 2,100 hp (1,566 kW) Pratt & Whitney R-2800 engines; 628 built.
PBM-5E
Variant of PBM-5 with improved radar.
PBM-5S
Lightened anti-submarine variant of PBM-5.
PBM-5S2
Improved anti-submarine aircraft with revised radar installation.
PBM-5A (Model 162G)
Amphibian version of PBM-5, with retractable tricycle undercarriage; 36 built plus four conversions.
Mariner I
British designation for 32 PBM-3B supplied to the Royal Air Force.

== Operators ==
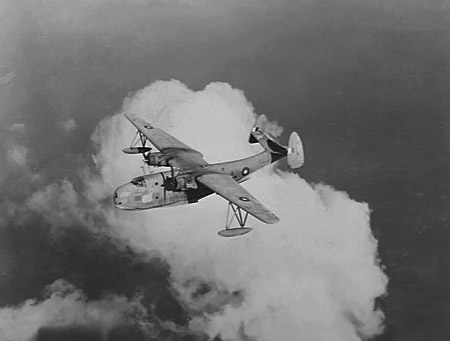
A 41 Sqn RAAF Mariner in 1944

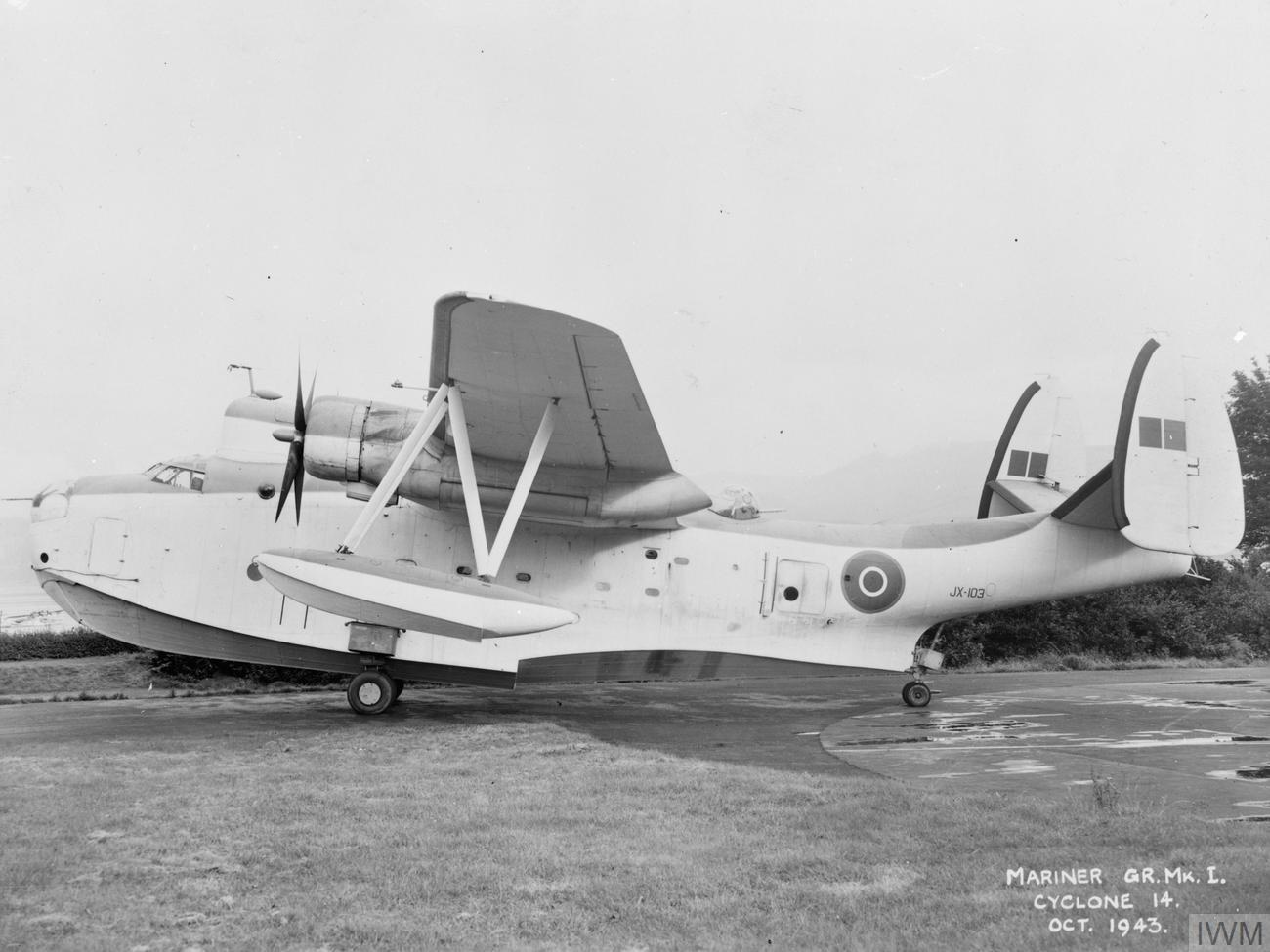
A 524 Sqn RAF Mariner I at Oban, Scotland (UK), in October 1943.

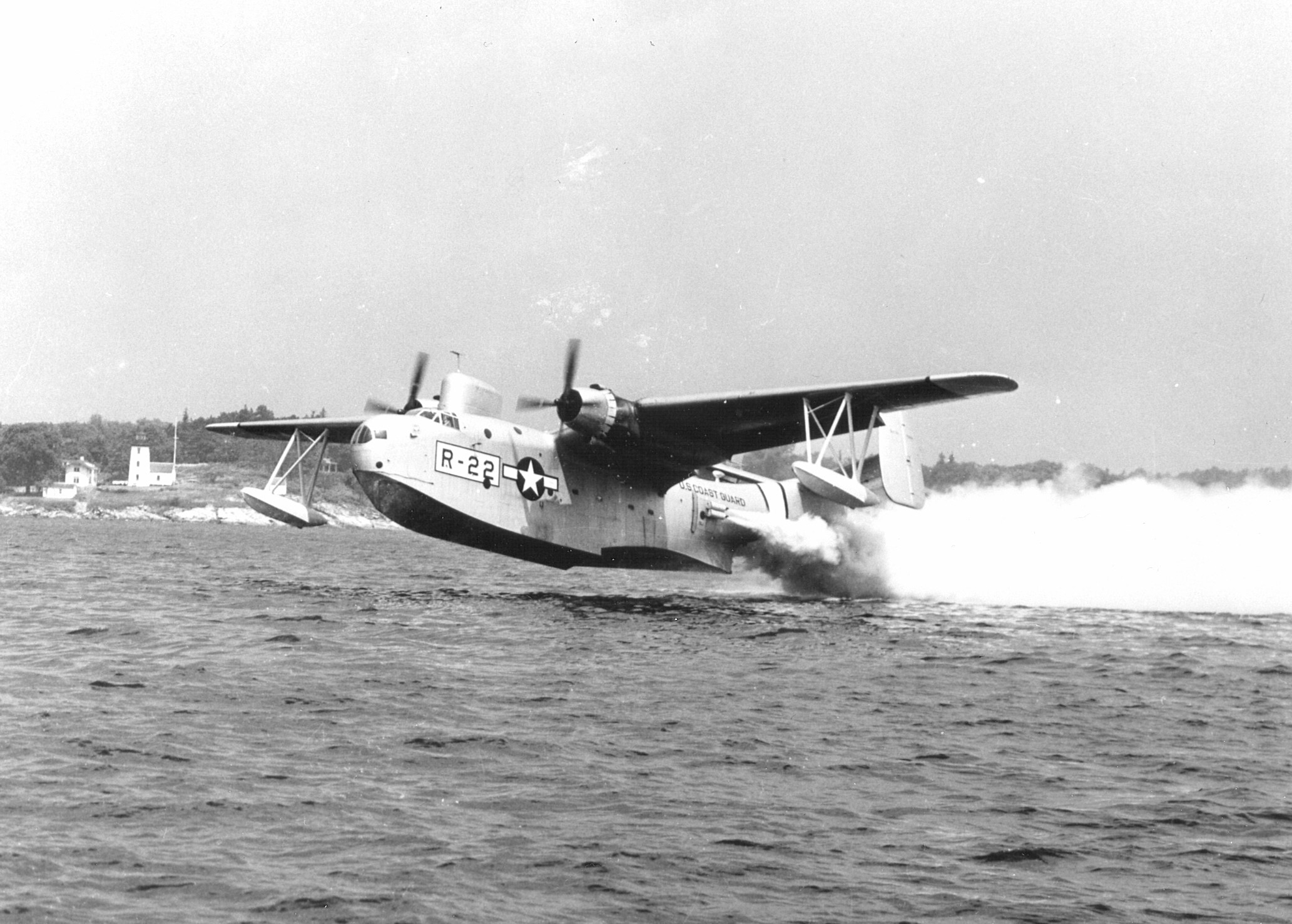
A U.S. Coast Guard PBM takes off from the water assisted by RATO.

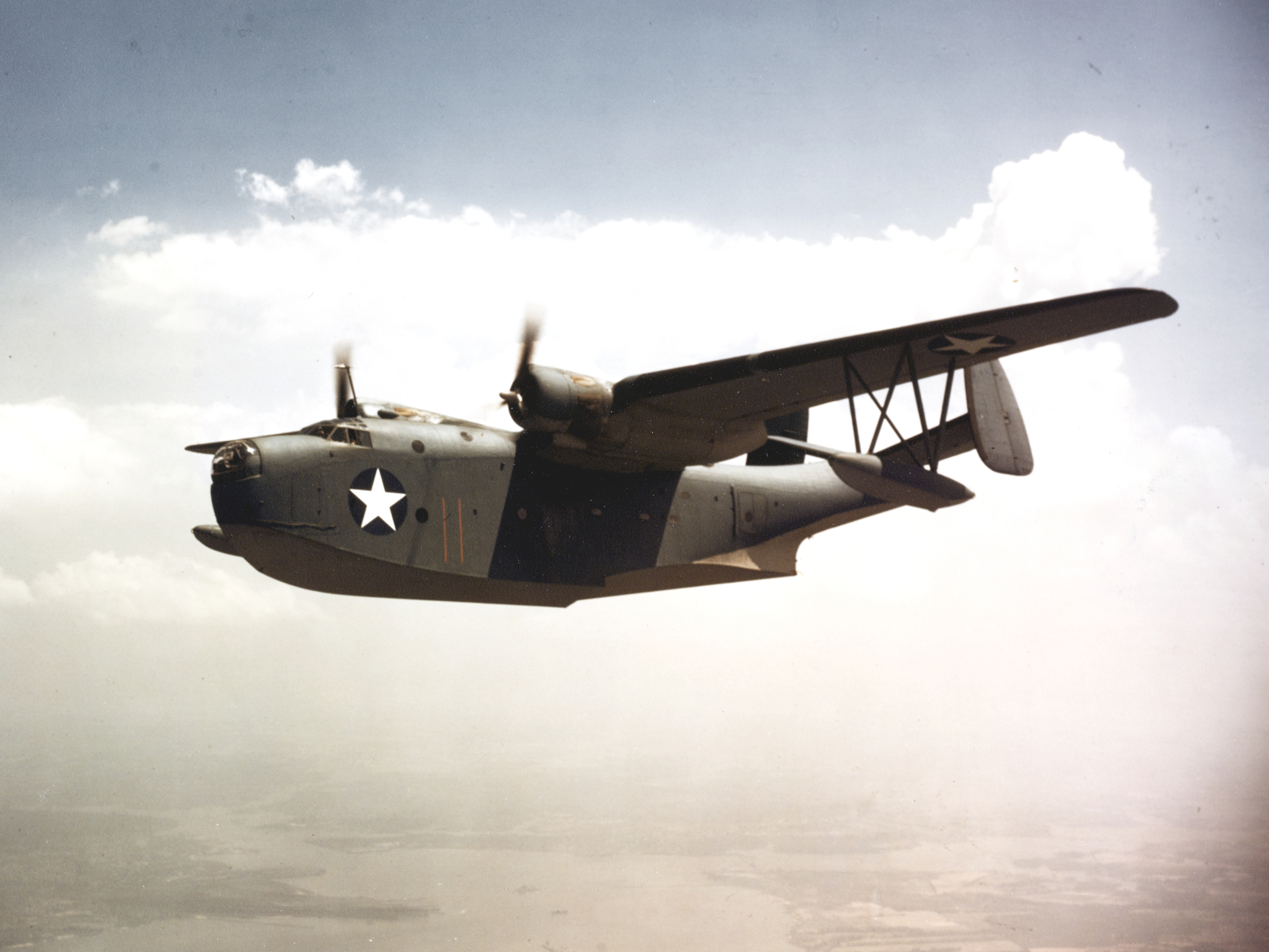
Martin PBM Mariner in US service in 1942

Argentina

- Argentine Navy purchased nine PBMs during the 1950s for the Argentine Naval Aviation, retiring its last Mariner in May 1962.

Australia

- Royal Australian Air Force
  - No. 40 Squadron RAAF
  - No. 41 Squadron RAAF

Netherlands

- Netherlands Naval Aviation Service
  - VSQ 321 based at Biak Air Base, Dutch New Guinea operated 15 PBM-5As between 1955 and 1960 after the retirement of their PBYs.

Panama

- Guardia Nacional
  - 5 PBM-5s

United Kingdom

- Royal Air Force ordered 33 Mariner Is, of which only 28 flying boats were ever delivered.
  - 524 Squadron operated 28 Mariner Is from October–December 1943 under command of No. 15 Group Coastal Command.

United States

- United States Navy
  - ATU-1
  - ATU-10
  - ATU-501
  - VPB-2
  - VR-8
  - VR-10
  - VR-21
  - VPB-16
  - VPB-17
  - VPB-20
  - VP-21
  - VPB-27
  - VPB-34
  - VP-40
  - VP-46
  - VP-56
  - VPB-98
  - VPB-99
  - VPB-202
  - VPB-203
  - VP-204
  - VP-205
  - VPB-206
  - VPB-207
  - VP-208
  - VPB-209
  - VPB-210
  - VPB-211
  - VPB-212
  - VPB-213
  - VPB-214
  - VPB-215
  - VPB-216
  - VP-731
  - VP-892
  - VH-1
  - VH-2
  - VH-3
  - VH-4
  - VH-5
  - VH-6
- United States Coast Guard

Uruguay

- National Navy of Uruguay purchased three PBM-5S2s in 1956, with the last retired on 3 February 1964.

== Surviving aircraft ==
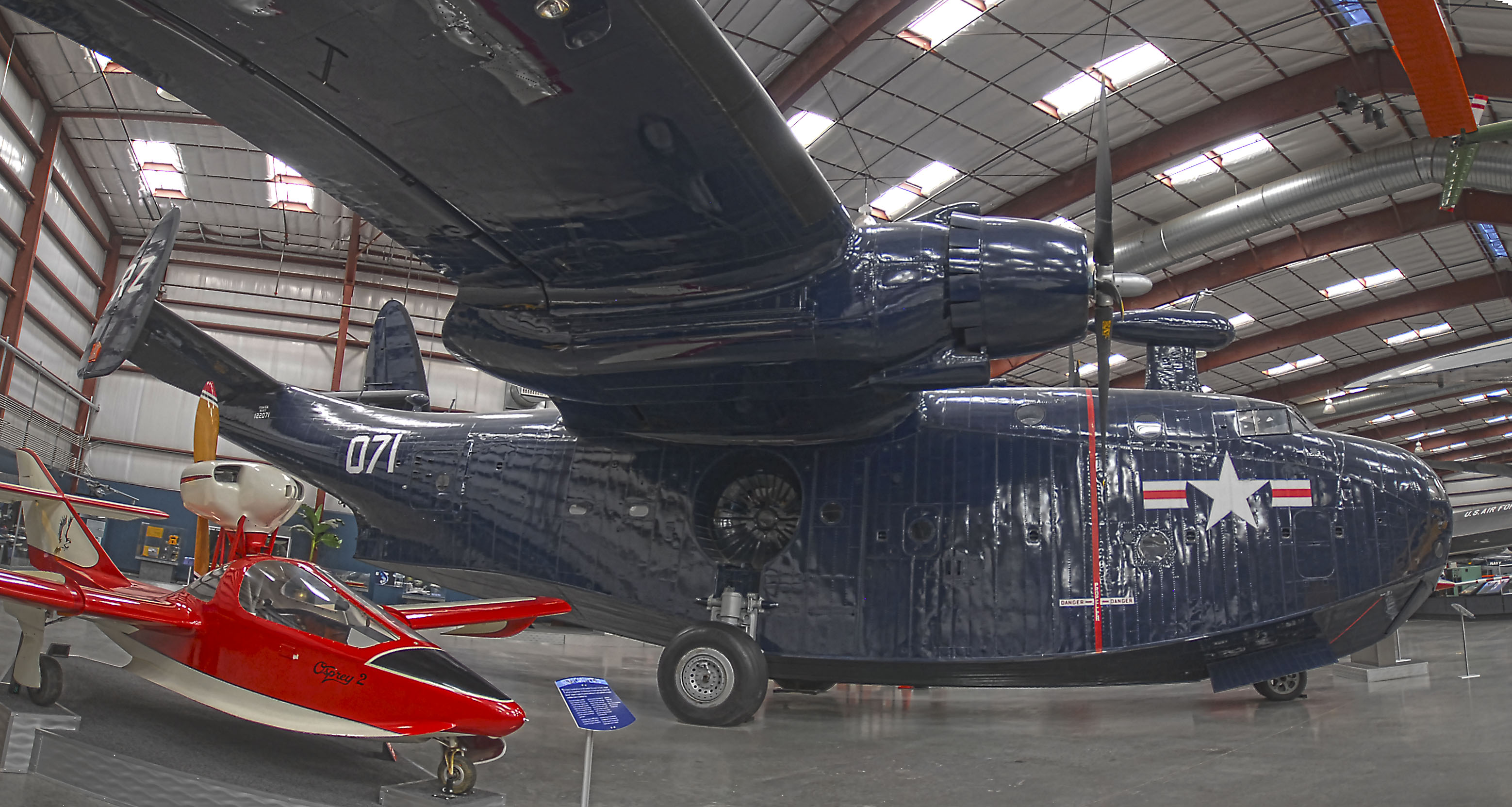
Martin PBM-5A Mariner on display at the Pima Air and Space Museum near Tucson, Arizona

- United States Navy PBM-5A (Bureau Number (BuNo) 122071) is the only surviving Mariner. It is on loan from the National Air and Space Museum in Washington, D.C., and is currently on display at the Pima Air & Space Museum adjacent to Davis–Monthan Air Force Base in Tucson, Arizona. Operated by the USN between 1948 and 1956, it is painted in the markings of Transport Squadron 21 (VR-21) and coded RZ 051 of the early 1950s.
- PBM-5 BuNo 59172 lies upside down under Lake Washington. It crashed on 6 May 1949, and after a number of unsuccessful attempts to recover the wreck over the following decades, it is now used as a training site for divers.
- The Model 162A (registered NX19168), the piloted three-eighths scale test aircraft, is on display at the Baltimore Museum of Industry.

== Accidents and incidents ==
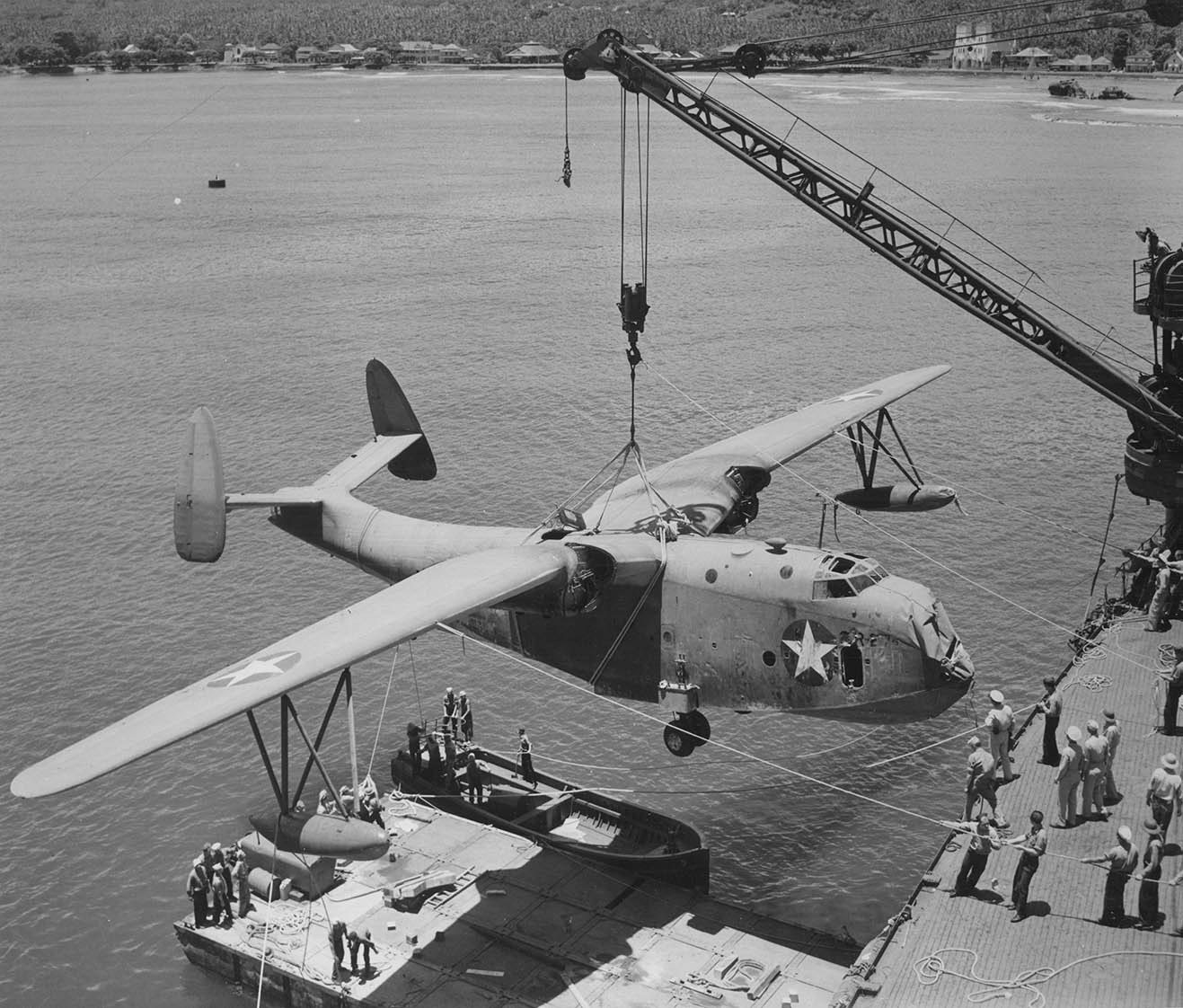
A damaged PBM Mariner is loaded on USS's aft deck in Apia Harbor, Samoa, on 15 February 1943.

- On 11 November 1942 a U.S. Navy PBM-5 (BuNo 1256) Naval Air Station Banana River, Florida. In unknown circumstances, while flying in the vicinity of the Banana River NAS, the seaplane caught fire and crashed. All 11 occupants were killed.
- On 6 August 1943 a U.S. Navy PBM-5 (BuNo 6713) (VP-205 USN/P-4) (Trinidad and Tobago) was shot down by the German submarine U-615 with no survivors among the 12-man crew.
- On 16 June 1944, a U.S. Navy PBM-5 exploded and crashed in San Francisco Bay, California, killing the pilot, Lieutenant William Hess, and eight other Navy crewmen.
- On 30 November 1944, a U.S. Navy PBM-5 crashed into Mount Tamalpais in northern California, killing eight naval aviators and naval aircrewmen. The aircraft had taken off from Naval Air Station Alameda and was part of a larger flight headed for Hawaii when it developed engine trouble shortly after takeoff.
- On 5 December 1945, a U.S. Navy PBM-5 (BuNo 59225), based at Naval Air Station Banana River, Florida, took off to search for the five TBM Avengers of Flight 19 from Naval Air Station Fort Lauderdale, Florida, which had disappeared during a training flight. The PBM was not heard of again, and it vanished from radar 20 minutes after taking off. A vessel in the area reported seeing a fireball and found an oil slick, and the PBM is believed to have been destroyed in a mid-air explosion off the coast of Florida near The Bahamas, but no remains of the PBM or its crew ever were found.
- The 1946 Antarctica PBM Mariner crash occurred on 30 December 1946, on Thurston Island, Antarctica, when a U.S. Navy PBM-5 Mariner crashed during a blizzard. Three men were killed in the crash. The six survivors were rescued 13 days later. Buno 59098 was one of four aircraft lost during Operation Highjump.
- On 31 October 1955, a PBM-5 Mariner (registration 59232) crashed on takeoff from Naval Station Coco Solo near the Panama Canal, resulting in the deaths of eight personnel. Contemporary news reports indicated a ninth person on the aircraft survived.
- On 10 September 1958, Mariner P-303 was being ferried to the Netherlands from Biak, Indonesia. Due to technical problems, a forced landing was carried out at Abadan, Iran. About two weeks later, repairs had been accomplished, and the aircraft took off. Shortly after takeoff, an oil leak was observed on engine number one. While on final approach for landing at Abadan airport, the aircraft suddenly lost height and crashed, killing all aboard. It appeared that the remaining propeller reversed thrust, causing the crew to lose control.
- On 9 November 1958, a PBM-5 Mariner (CS-THB, named Porto Santo) of the Portuguese airline ARTOP (Aero-Topográfica) piloted by Harry Frank Broadbent and co-piloted by Thomas Rowell, carrying four other crew and 30 passengers, disappeared on a scheduled passenger flight from Cabo Ruivo, Lisbon, Portugal to Funchal, Madeira. The last communication from the aircraft (when it was about 13°W) was a radio message code "QUG", meaning "I am forced to land immediately". No trace has ever been found of the aircraft, nor its six crew or 30 passengers.

== Specifications (PBM-1) ==
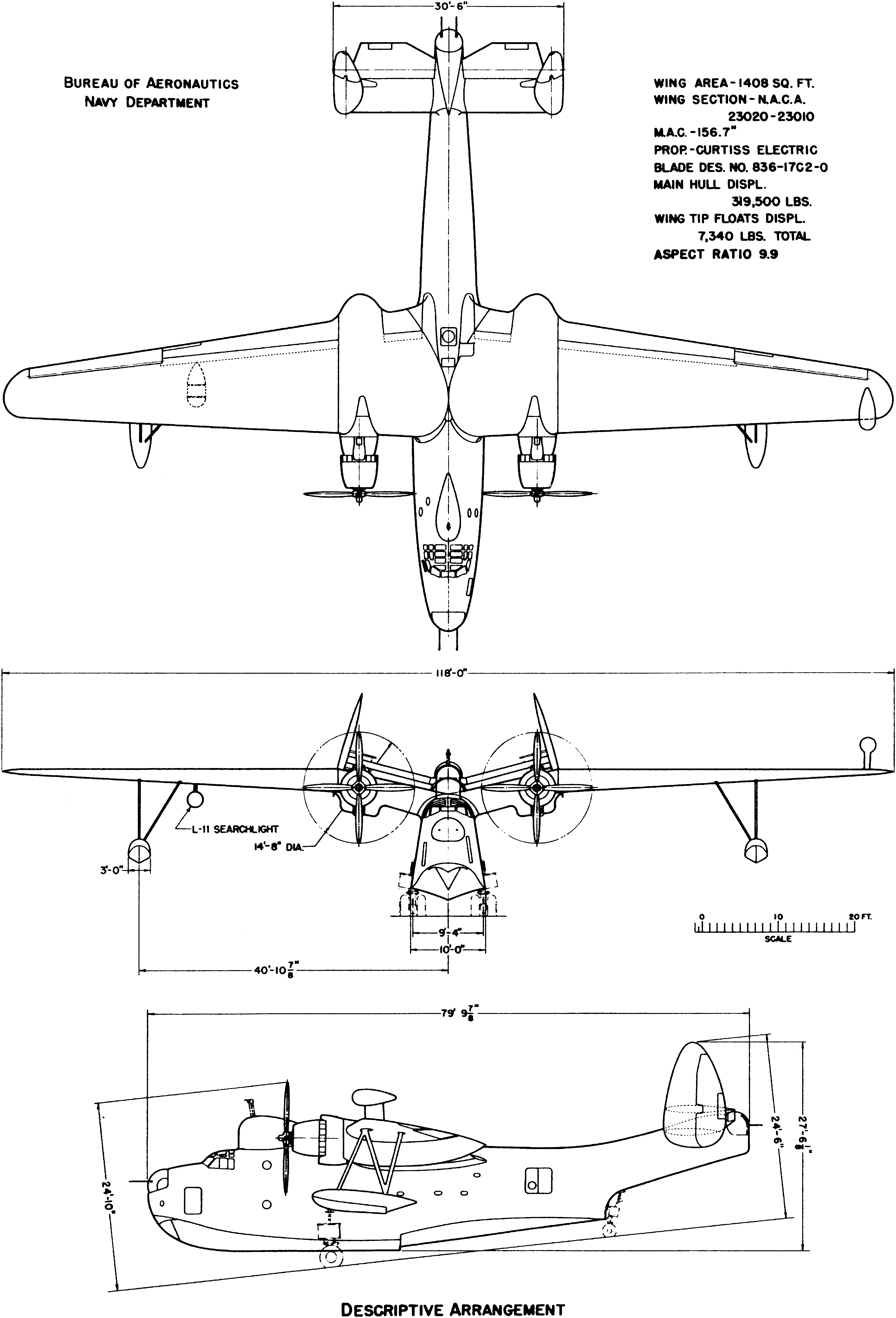
3-view line drawing of the Martin PBM-5S Mariner

Data from Jane's Fighting Aircraft of World War II

General characteristics

- Crew: Seven
- Length: 79 ft 10 in (23.50 m)
- Wingspan: 118 ft 0 in (36 m)
- Height: 27 ft 6 in (5.33 m)
- Wing area: 1,408 sq ft (131 m^{2})
- Empty weight: 33,175 lb (15,048 kg)
- Gross weight: 56,000 lb (25,425 kg)
- Powerplant: 2 × Wright R-2600-6 14-cylinder radial engines, 1,600 hp (1,194 kW) each

Performance

- Maximum speed: 178 kn (205 mph, 330 km/h)
- Range: 2,600 nmi (3,000 mi, 4,800 km)
- Service ceiling: 19,800 ft (6,040 m)
- Rate of climb: 800 ft/min (4.1 m/s)

Armament

- Guns: 8 × .50 in (12.7 mm) M2 Browning machine guns (two each in nose, dorsal and tail turrets, one each in blisters amidships)
- Bombs: 4,000 lb (1,800 kg) of bombs or depth charges or 2 × Mark 13 torpedoes

== See also ==
- Flight 19

Related development

- Martin P5M Marlin
- Martin JRM Mars

Aircraft of comparable role, configuration, and era

- Beriev Be-6
- Boeing XPBB Sea Ranger
- Consolidated PBY Catalina
- Consolidated PB2Y Coronado
- Consolidated XP4Y Corregidor
- Short Sunderland
- Sikorsky XPBS-1
- Kawanishi H6K "Mavis"
- Kawanishi H8K "Emily"

Related lists

- List of bomber aircraft
- List of United States Navy aircraft designations (pre-1962)
- List of military aircraft of the United States
- List of flying boats and floatplanes
- List of aircraft of World War II
