= VPB-98 =

Patrol Bombing Squadron 98
- Active: 1 October 1944 – 1 April 1946
- Country: United States of America
- Branch: United States Navy
- Type: squadron
- Role: Maritime patrol

Aircraft flown
- Patrol: PBM-3D/5/5D

VPB-98 was a Patrol Bombing Squadron of the U.S. Navy. The squadron was established as Patrol Bombing Squadron 98 (VPB-98) on 1 October 1944 and disestablished on 1 April 1946.

== Operational history ==
- 1 October 1944: VPB-98 was established at NAS Corpus Christi, Texas, as a medium seaplane squadron flying the PBM Mariner. During this period the squadron came under the operational control of Fleet Air Detachment, West Coast. The primary mission of the squadron was to serve as a training unit for PBM replacement crews.
- 8 November 1944: VPB-98 was transferred to NAS San Diego, California, coming under the operational control of FAW-14. The squadron was fully operational and began training the first replacement crews by 8 December 1944. During its brief existence the squadron averaged 400 flights per month, training an average of 35 crews per month.
- September 1945: With the Surrender of Japan on 10 August the need for more replacement crews was greatly diminished. Accordingly, personnel were rapidly demobilized from the squadron and operations significantly slowed down.
- 1 April 1946: VPB-98 was disestablished at NAS San Diego.

== Aircraft assignments ==
The squadron was assigned the following aircraft, effective on the dates shown:

- PBM-3D - November 1944
- PBM-5 JATO - January 1945
- PBM-5D - May 1945

== Home port assignments ==
The squadron was assigned to these home ports, effective on the dates shown:

- NAS Corpus Christi, Texas - 1 October 1944
- NAS San Diego, California - 8 November 1944

== See also ==
- Maritime patrol aircraft
- List of inactive United States Navy aircraft squadrons
- List of United States Navy aircraft squadrons
- List of squadrons in the Dictionary of American Naval Aviation Squadrons
- History of the United States Navy
