= General Ulpiano Paez Airport =

General Ulpiano Paez Airport Aeropuerto General Ulpiano Paez
- IATA: SNC; ICAO: SESA

Summary
- Airport type: Public/Military
- Location: Salinas, Ecuador
- Elevation AMSL: 20 ft (6.1 m)
- Coordinates: 02°12′20″S 80°59′20″W

Map
- Location of airport in Ecuador

Runways
Direction	Length		Surface
Direction	m	ft	Surface
13/31	2,630	8,629	Asphalt
08/26	1,130	3,707	Asphalt
- Source: WAD GCM

General Ulpiano Paez Airport (IATA: SNC, ICAO: SESA) is a public/military joint-use airport serving the coastal city of Salinas, in the Santa Elena Province of Ecuador. The city and airport are on a peninsula extending into the Pacific Ocean.

== History ==
During World War II the airport was used by the United States Army Air Forces Sixth Air Force defending the South American coastline and the Panama Canal against Japanese submarines. Flying units assigned to the airfield were:

- 25th Bombardment Squadron (Panama Canal Department), 21 January 1942 – 22 May 1943, (B-24 Liberator)
- 3d Bombardment Squadron (6th Bombardment Group), 23 May-11 June 1943, (B-17 Flying Fortress)
- 51st Fighter Squadron (32d Fighter Group) December 1942-March 1943 (P-40 Warhawk)

== See also ==
- Transport in Ecuador
- List of airports in Ecuador
