= Harvey Point Defense Testing Activity =

Training facility in North Carolina, U.S.

- Perquimans County, North Carolina

Site information
- Owner: U.S. Department of Defense
- Open to the public: No
- Condition: Fully operational

Location
- Location within North Carolina
- Coordinates: 36.1°N 76.33°W

Site history
- Built: 1942
- In use: 1942–1946; 1958–present

Garrison information
- Occupants: Bureau of Alcohol, Tobacco, Firearms and Explosives; Central Intelligence Agency; Federal Bureau of Investigation; United States Navy

Airfield information
- Identifiers: FAA LID: NC01
- Elevation: 10 feet (3 m) AMSL
Runways
Direction	Length and surface
03/21	5,291 feet (1,613 m) Asphalt

The Harvey Point Defense Testing Activity facility, owned by the United States Department of Defense, is located on a peninsula in Perquimans County, North Carolina, along Albemarle Sound, near the town of Hertford. It was established in World War II as Naval Auxiliary Air Station Harvey Point, an operating base for sea planes conducting anti-submarine surveillance off the Atlantic coast. A close by naval facility, Naval Air Station Weeksville, served as a blimp base from 1941 to 1957, while another former naval air facility remains active as Coast Guard Air Station Elizabeth City.

To comply with various procurement regulations, the Department of the Navy holds the title to and budgetary responsibility for the facility. Agencies such as the ATF, CIA, and FBI have used the facility for complex training relating to overseas counterterrorism and asset-protection training. It has a sister facility in Virginia called Camp Peary.

== History ==
The point was originally occupied during the 1670s by the Harvey family, including North Carolina's first native-born governor, Thomas Harvey—hence the name "Harvey Point".

== World War II ==
Courthouse records indicate that in November 1942 the United States Navy purchased the point, roughly 1,200 acres (5 km^{2}), for $41,751. The Navy then constructed an air station on the property for use during World War II, and commissioned it as Naval Auxiliary Air Station Harvey Point. During World War II, NAAS Harvey Point was used as a PBM Mariner seaplane base.

After the war, NAAS Harvey Point was decommissioned in 1946 and remained deactivated until 1958 when the Navy announced that Harvey Point would serve as the testing grounds for the new Martin P6M Seamaster, an experimental jet-powered long-range seaplane bomber. The project was cancelled in August 1959 when the Navy determined the aircraft wasn't successful enough for it to continue providing support for the program. Then, in 1961, the Navy returned to the property, and announced that the property was closed to the public; it has remained that way ever since.

== Current use ==
Specialty military air operations are located at this facility, as the installation has two usable landing fields, and plans for a third. The FAA Charlotte Sectional Aeronautical Chart identifies this area as Special Use Airspace R-5301, which is continuously restricted from general aviation traffic from the surface to an altitude of 14,000 feet above Mean Sea Level. Areas of Albemarle Sound adjacent to the facility are also under restricted airspace R-5302 (A-D), which is under the operational authority of GIANT KILLER, or whichever ATC has controlling authority over the airspace at that time. Harvey Point is also used for CIA (Central Intelligence Agency) paramilitary and counter-terrorism courses that involve high explosives and ballistics. The explosives are used to simulate terrorist bombs, and can be heard for miles in the surrounding communities.

It was also used by DEVGRU (a.k.a. "SEAL Team Six") to train for the raid that killed Osama bin Laden, in a scale mockup of his secret compound.

== See also ==
- Camp Peary
- CIA University
- Sherman Kent School for Intelligence Analysis
- Warrenton Training Center
