= Albemarle =

Albemarle may refer to:

== People ==
- Albemarle (given name)
- Duke of Albemarle, includes a list of the dukes
- Earl of Albemarle, includes a list of the earls

== Places ==
=== United States ===
- Albemarle, North Carolina, a city
- Albemarle Sound, an estuary on the coast of North Carolina
- Albemarle County, North Carolina, abolished 1739
- Albemarle County, Virginia
- Albemarle Settlements, the first permanent English settlements in what is now North Carolina

=== Elsewhere ===
- Albemarle, Falkland Islands, a tiny settlement on West Falkland
- Albemarle Township, now part of the town of South Bruce Peninsula, Ontario, Canada
- Aumale, France, formerly Albemarle, a commune in Upper Normandy
- Isabela Island (Galápagos), Ecuador, the largest island of the Galápagos Islands, originally known as Albemarle

== Military ==
- HMS Albemarle, five ships of the Royal Navy
- USS Albemarle, three ships of the US Navy
- CSS Albemarle, a Confederate States Navy ram
- Armstrong Whitworth Albemarle, a World War II transport aircraft of the Royal Air Force
- Albemarle Barracks, a prisoner-of-war camp during the American Revolutionary War
- Albemarle Barracks, England, a British Army barracks in Northumberland

== Schools ==
- College of The Albemarle, Elizabeth City, North Carolina, United States, a community college
- Albemarle High School (disambiguation)
- Albemarle Training School, a segregated school for African Americans in Albemarle County, Virginia

== Other uses ==
- Albemarle Baptist Church, Scarborough, North Yorkshire, England
- Albemarle Club, a private club in London, now defunct
- Albemarle Corporation, an American chemical company
- Albemarle Gallery, an art gallery located in Mayfair, London
- Albemarle Hospital, Elizabeth City, North Carolina
- Albemarle Hotel, Manhattan, New York City, a former hotel
- Albemarle Street, Mayfair, London
- Museum of the Albemarle, Elizabeth City, North Carolina
- Albemarle (1776), a convict ship of the Third Fleet to Australia

== See also ==
- Port Albemarle, Falkland Islands
- Albemarle Group, a geologic group in North Carolina
