= USS Albemarle =

Three ships of the United States Navy have been named Albemarle, after the Albemarle Sound in North Carolina.

- USS Albemarle (1863), was a schooner captured and taken into the Navy in 1863 and sold in October 1865.
- USS Albemarle (1865), a sunken former Confederate ironclad, raised and taken into the Navy in 1865, and sold in 1867.
- USS Albemarle (AV-5), was a seaplane tender in service from 1940 to 1960 and scrapped in 1975.
