= HMS Monck =

One ship and one shore establishment of the Royal Navy have been named HMS Monck, after George Monck, 1st Duke of Albemarle.

- English ship Monck (1659) was a 52-gun third-rate frigate launched in 1659. She was rebuilt in 1702 as a 60-gun fourth-rate ship of the line, and was wrecked in 1720.
- HMS Monck (shore establishment) was the Combined Training Headquarters, commissioned at Largs, Ayrshire, in 1942. By 1944 the establishment covered the Combined Operations Carrier Training, the naval barracks and the landing craft base at Port Glasgow, and the ICE school at Rosneath naval base. The establishment was paid off in 1946.
  - HMS Monck II was the headquarters for unallocated landing craft, commissioned at Greenock in 1944 and paid off later that year.

== See also ==
- HMS Monck Prize
- HMS Albemarle
