= Vincent P. de Poix =

Vice admiral in U.S. Navy

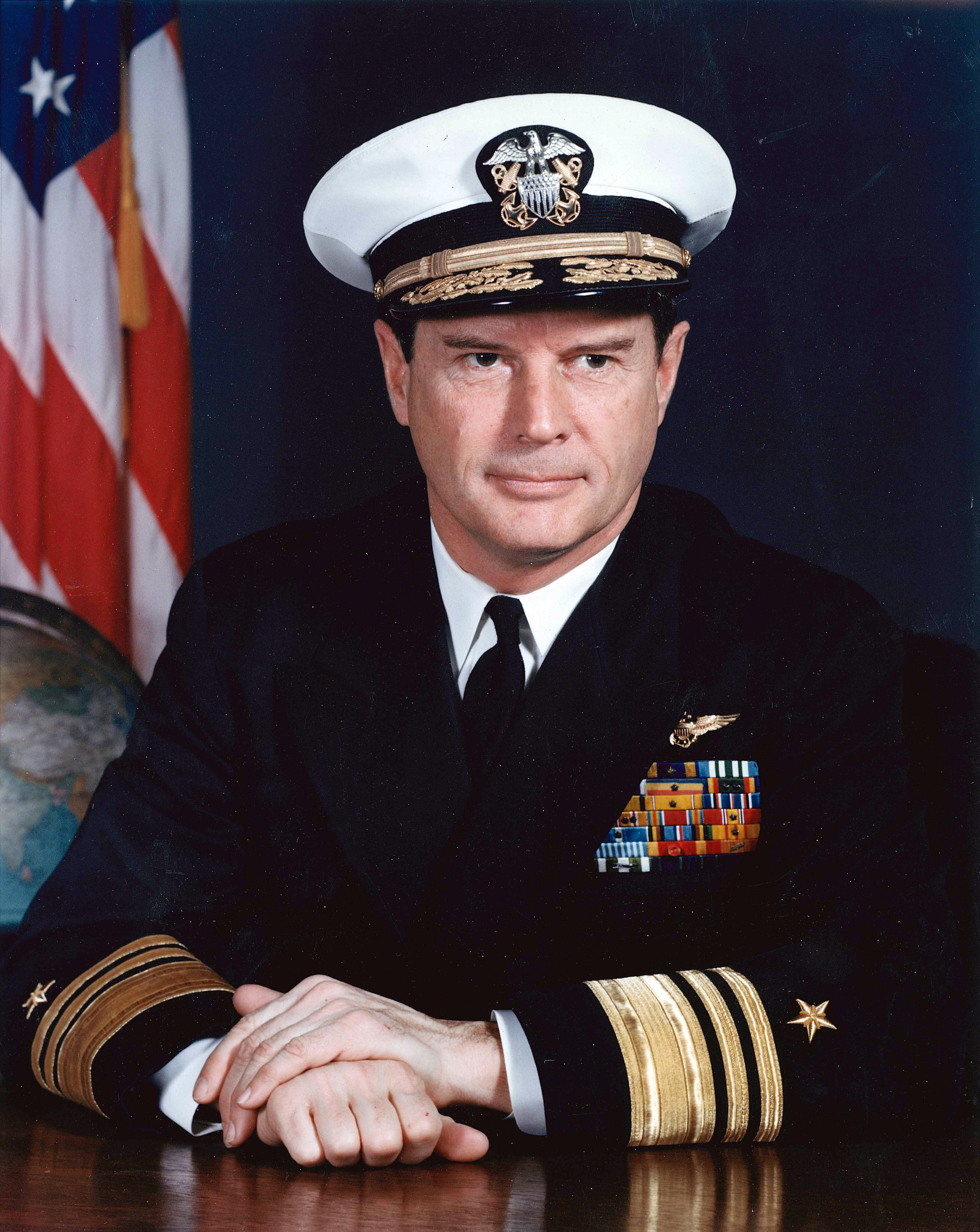
- Born: August 13, 1916; Los Angeles County, California, U.S.
- Died: February 3, 2015 (aged 98); Oregon, U.S.
- Military career
- Allegiance: United States of America
- Branch: United States Navy
- Service years: 1939–1974
- Rank: Vice admiral
- Commands: Commanding Officer, Fighter Squadron 172; Commanding Officer, Air Development Squadron Four; Commanding Officer, USS Albemarle; Commanding Officer, USS Enterprise (CVN-65); Commander, Carrier Division 7; Commander, Second Fleet; Director, Defense Intelligence Agency

Vincent Paul de Poix (August 13, 1916 – February 3, 2015) was a vice admiral in the United States Navy. He began his career as a naval aviator and fighting in World War II aboard USS Enterprise (CV-6). A graduate of the United States Naval Academy, he became the first captain of the newly commissioned USS Enterprise (CVN-65) in November 1961. He later participated in the Vietnam War, and commanded the United States Second Fleet. He was Director of the Defense Intelligence Agency from August 1972 to September 1974.

== Early life ==
De Poix was born as Vincent Paul De Poix in Los Angeles, California, on August 13, 1916. De Poix's father was Elzear Paul de Poix and his mother was Grace L. (née Howard) de Poix.

De Poix attended Horace Greeley High School in Chappaqua, New York. De Poix attended Severn School, a prep school for U.S. Naval Academy, in Severna Park, Maryland.

== Education ==
De Poix attended Lafayette College in Easton, Pennsylvania. In 1939, De Poix graduated from the U.S. Naval Academy in Annapolis, Maryland, with distinction and ranked 26th in a class of 581.

De Poix was trained as a naval aviator at NAS Pensacola. In March 1944, he began ordnance engineering (aviation) instruction at the Naval Postgraduate School, Annapolis, Maryland. In August 1946, the admiral attended the Massachusetts Institute of Technology at Cambridge Massachusetts, and received a master of science degree in aeronautical engineering. In 1959-1960, he studied nuclear power operations, receiving certification in 1960. From 1963-64, the admiral attended the National War College, Washington, D.C.

== Career ==
After being commissioned an ensign on 1 June 1939, de Poix joined USS Minneapolis (CA-36); then, a year later, USS Sicard (DM-21). After naval aviator training, he was attached to the Advance Carrier Training Group at San Diego County, California. From June 1942 to August 1943, he served in the South Pacific; this time frame included tours with Fighter Squadron 6 (VF-6) on board USS Enterprise (CV-6) and USS Saratoga (CV-3), along with a shore based tour on Guadalcanal, and subsequent operations in the Solomon Islands campaign.

Subsequent assignments included a tour with the Aviation Fire Control Unit at the Naval Ordnance Test Station, Inyokern, California. From January 1948 to June 1950, he was commander of Fighter Squadron 172 (VF-172) based in Florida. From 1950 to 1952, he served with the Bureau of Ordnance Research and Development Division Aviation Ordnance Branch, Washington, D.C. From 1952, he served as aviation readiness and aviation ordnance officer for the commander-in-chief, U.S. Pacific Fleet. He served in leadership positions in the Naval Operation Office Guided Missiles Division until June 1957, when he assumed command of Air Development Squadron 4 (VX-4), Point Mugu, California.

In March 1959, he became commanding officer of the seaplane tender USS Albemarle (AV-5), which was followed by training with the Atomic Energy Commission Reactor Development Division Office of the Assistant Director for Naval Reactors.

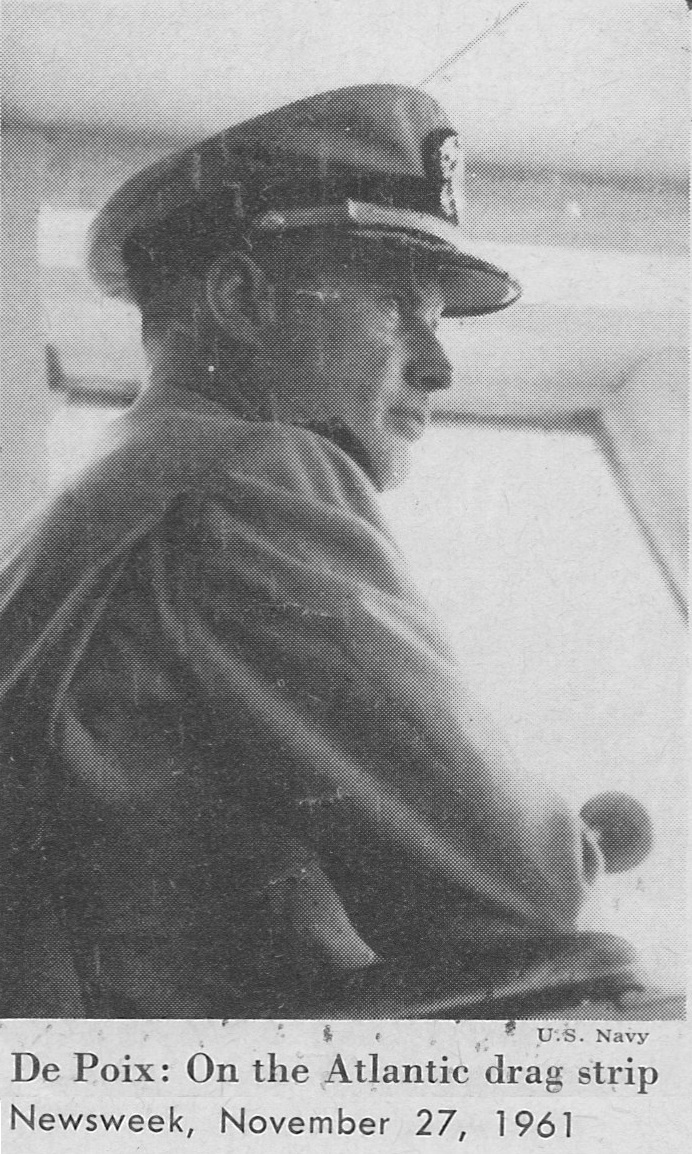
Captain V. de Poix, C.O. of Aircraft Carrier USS Enterprise (1961).

In September 1960, he was ordered to duty as prospective commanding officer of the USS Enterprise (CVA(N)-65) (later redesignated CVN-65). Launched on 24 September 1960, she was at the time the largest naval warship ever constructed and was the world's first nuclear-powered aircraft carrier. When the vessel was commissioned on 25 November 1961, de Poix became her first captain.

In July 1963, he was detached for instruction at the National War College, Washington, D.C.

de Poix was assigned to the Office of the Chief of Naval Operations in 1964, followed by a tour as assistant director for administration and management in Defense Research and Engineering, and as assistant director of operational test and evaluation.

In August 1966, he reported as commander Carrier Division 7, bound for Vietnam.

In September 1967, de Poix became assistant deputy chief of naval operations (Development), and then in February 1969, Deputy Director of Defense Research and Engineering (Administration, Evaluation and Management), Office of the Secretary of Defense. In August 1971, he assumed command of the Second Fleet.

== Defense Intelligence Agency ==
de Poix reported as deputy director of the Defense Intelligence Agency in July 1972, and became director the next month.

de Poix continued the reorganization of the Agency begun by his predecessor, General Donald V. Bennett. Streamlining the organization had become critical since severe manpower cutbacks had taken a major toll on the agency. DIA manpower had been cut by one third after Vietnam. By 1973, nearly all elements had been consolidated and realigned.

In September 1972, Secretary of State William Rogers said that the US and the Soviet Union were moving away from a world of containment to one of engagement. Yet even though relations warmed into a period of détente, the need for defense intelligence did not diminish. Such intelligence was an intrinsic component of military strength, and, as President Nixon reiterated in the spring of 1973, the US had to remain militarily strong if negotiations with communist nations were to be successful.

President Nixon met with much success in foreign affairs, but quite the reverse in domestic issues. While some of his diplomatic and military decisions—in the latter case, for example, over how and when to end American involvement in Indochina—were controversial, nothing so undermined Americans' confidence in the executive as the Watergate break-in and the President's complicity in the cover-up. As the intelligence community was tied into the executive branch, that distrust tainted the public's perception of that community. Furthermore, many Americans believed that the intelligence community had itself engaged in some improper—if not illegal—actions abroad (there were suspicions about CIA involvement in the September 1973 Chilean coup). This meant that de Poix faced the challenge of steering DIA through some hostile waters.

The fourth major Arab-Israeli conflict, the Yom Kippur or October War, commenced on 6 October 1973. The massive attacks launched by Syria and Egypt had caught the Israelis unprepared, and was seen as a major intelligence failure for both the United States and Israel.

In the post-Watergate controversy surrounding American intelligence activities, DIA and its director answered detractors by remaining focused on providing quality products to national policy makers. The agency's reputation grew as its products were increasingly perceived throughout the government as valuable to the decision-making process. The agency was able to do this even while suffering from a personnel shortage, something which was of major concern at the 1972 Williamsburg Conference. Conference participants considered DIA resource decrements, while emphasizing technology and an upgrade of the National Military Intelligence Center (NMIC). The general counsel function was also added.

The agency's analysts wrestled with varied and numerous issues between the summer of 1972, when de Poix came on board, and the fall of 1974. They studied Lebanon, China (to aid in the normalizing of relations), the formation of Sri Lanka, and, of course, Salvador Allende's regime in Chile. The Agency also had analysts dedicated to the task of resolving Vietnam POW/MIA issues. They faced the intelligence challenges associated with maintaining détente, establishing arms control agreements (such as the SALT II talks in 1974), and the Paris Peace Accords (Vietnam). Other issues of note were global energy concerns (such as the petroleum shortages that led to long gas lines), and troubles throughout Africa. These and other world events brought greater emphasis on DIA products by decision makers.

President Gerald Ford wanted continuity in foreign affairs, so he promised Congress in August 1974 he would continue to try to improve relations with the Soviet Union and China. Defense intelligence would continue to play a role in forming US policies and in negotiations. DIA and its director, de Poix, had managed not only to maintain continuity of operations during these critical years, but also improve DIA's performance.

One area of particular emphasis during de Poix's leadership at DIA was the upgrading of the agency's human intelligence capability, accomplished by enhancing the effectiveness of the Defense Attaché System.

== Post-military career ==
Subsequent to retirement from the Navy, de Poix was associated for ten years with Teledyne, Inc in positions as company president and group executive. de Poix died on February 3, 2015, at the age of 98.

== Filmography ==
- 1961 To Tell the Truth - as himself, contestant. November 20, 1961, episode.

== Awards, decorations and badges ==
Military Decorations

| Navy Distinguished Service Medal with three Gold Stars |
| Legion of Merit |
| Purple Heart |
| Air Medal with Gold Star |
| Joint Service Commendation Medal |
| American Defense Service Medal |
| American Campaign Medal |
| Asiatic Pacific Campaign Medal |
| World War II Victory Medal |
| Navy Expeditionary Medal |
| National Defense Service Medal with Bronze Star |
| Korean Service Medal with Bronze Star |
| Armed Forces Expeditionary Medal (Cuba) |
| Vietnam Service Medal with Bronze Star |
| National Order of Vietnam (Officer) |
| Vietnamese Gallantry Cross with Palm |
| United Nations Korea Medal |
| Vietnam Campaign Medal |
| Navy Rifle Marksmanship Ribbon |
| Navy Pistol Marksmanship Ribbon |

Unit Awards

| Navy Presidential Unit Citation with Bronze Star |
| Navy Unit Commendation with two Bronze Stars |
| Vietnam Gallantry Cross Unit Citation |

Badges

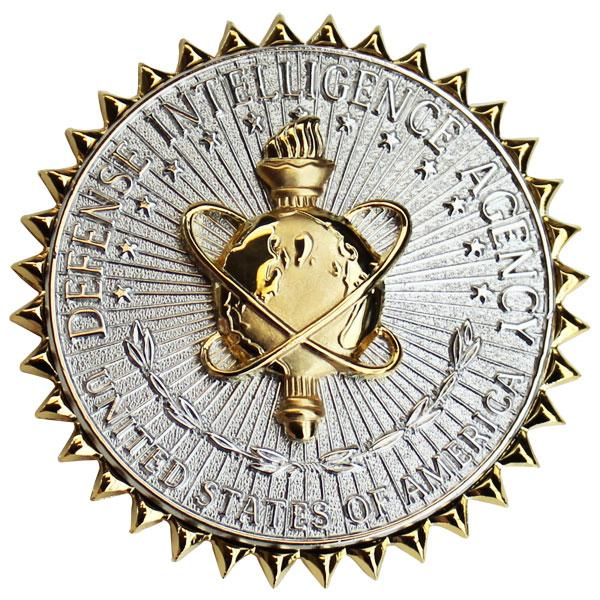
| Naval Aviator Badge |
| Joint Staff Identification Badge |
| Defense Intelligence Agency Badge |

National Non-Military Awards

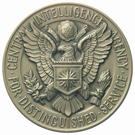
| Central Intelligence Agency Distinguished Intelligence Medal |
