= Project Flat Top =

US mobile helicopter repair ship in use during the Vietnam War

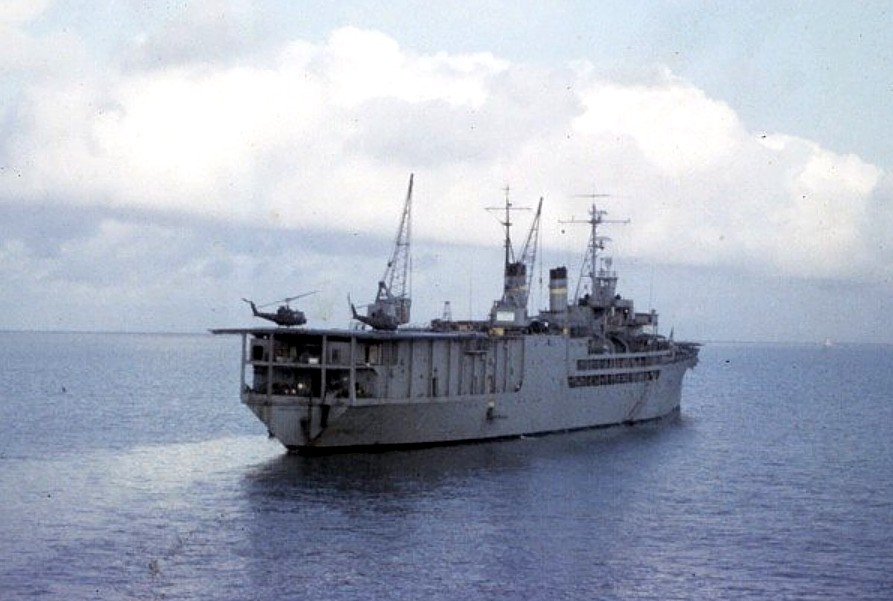
USNS Corpus Christi Bay (T-ARVH-1) at anchor off Vung Tau, South Vietnam, circa 1967–1969. Two UH-1 "Huey" helicopters sit atop her aft flight deck.

Project Flat Top was a United States Army project during the Vietnam War to convert USS Albemarle, a World War II-era seaplane tender, into a forward theater, offshore helicopter repair facility. Helicopters had been used during the Korean War to ferry wounded and supplies. Some US combat officers recognized the possibility of using armed helicopters to provide close air support. But other organizations and branches strenuously objected to allowing the Army to deliver ordnance via aircraft. The Army Staff in The Pentagon responded slowly to a study from the Army Aircraft Requirements Review Board chaired by Lieutenant general (LTG) Gordon B. Rogers that suggested adopting helicopters for use in a combat role. Defense Secretary Robert McNamara bypassed Secretary of the Army Elvis Jacob Stahr Jr. and directed LTG Hamilton H. Howze, the Army's first director of aviation, to conduct a review of the tactical possibilities suggested by the study. The Howze Board report received by McNamara in September 1962 proposed huge changes in Army doctrine, prescribing an airmobility doctrine integrating helicopters into combat.

With helicopters increasingly at the center of Army doctrine as a result of the Howze Board's recommendations, it became apparent that a logistical gap would arise between the operational area and repair bases in the US. Lieutenant Colonel (LTC) John Sullivan, a respected Army aviator, conceived of the idea to convert a ship into a floating helicopter repair facility. Sullivan was named by General Frank Besson, commanding general of the newly formed United States Army Materiel Command (AMC), to lead the project.

After considerable research, Sullivan and his team selected the World War II Curtiss-class seaplane tender USS Albemarle (AV-5). When progress slowed for almost a year, Sullivan bypassed Army leadership and persuaded influential Congressman Mendel Rivers of South Carolina, chairman of the House Armed Services Committee, to support the project. New shops, instruments, technology, communications, and storage were added to the ship over 15 months at a cost of $25 million. Rechristened as USNS Corpus Christi Bay (T-ARVH-1), a civilian United States Merchant Marine (USMM) crew was chosen to operate the bridge, engine room, and man the ship's watches. This was a controversial move that generated concern about their placement near a combat zone and their potential treatment under the Geneva Conventions. US Army soldiers staffed the multiple repair shops that were equipped with custom facilities that could repair or fabricate parts to factory standards.

The ship offered the same echelon of depot-level service available in the U.S. at the Army Aeronautical Depot Maintenance Center in Corpus Christi, Texas while it served off the coast of South Vietnam for 6½ years. The soldiers repaired as many as 20,000 aircraft components a month and saved the military millions of dollars. When the war was drawing down, the ship left for the U.S. in late 1972. On 17 July 1975, after more than 36 years of service, the ship was scrapped.

== Background ==
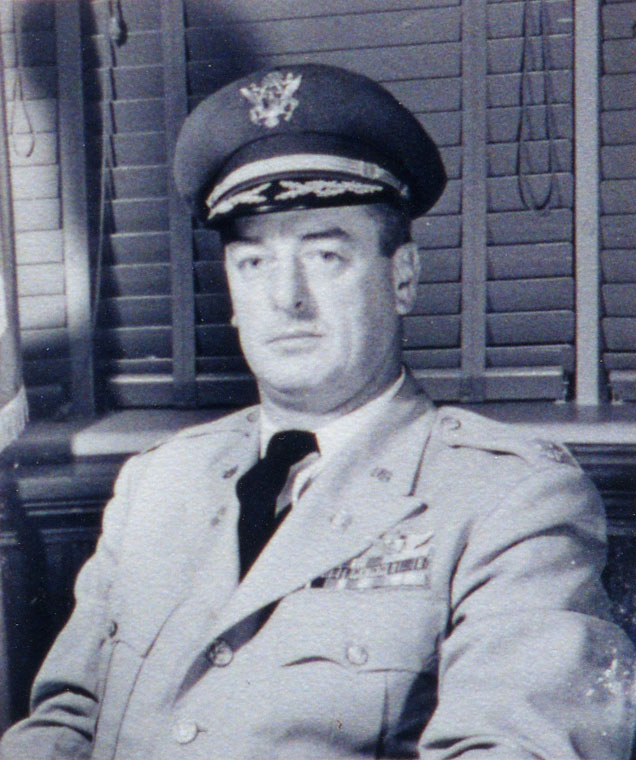
LTC John F. Sullivan conceived of building a floating aircraft repair ship for service off South Vietnam

At the beginning of the 1960s, the US Army evaluated a concept called FAMF (Floating Aircraft Maintenance Facility), a way to support aircraft far abroad on a mobile ship. The Army Materiel Command established a top-level Project Management Office called “Project Flat-Top”. It was originally envisioned the project would acquire and convert a mothballed WWII US Navy small aircraft carrier.

In October 1961, LTC John F. Sullivan was selected by the Army Chief of Transportation in the US Army Transportation Materiel Command (TMC) to study production management at the Army Aeronautical Depot Maintenance Center (ARADMAC). In January, 1962, Sullivan passed a highly selective screening process and was temporarily assigned to attend the Armed Forces Staff College in Norfolk, Virginia. When he returned to ARADMAC in May he was appointed Director of Production Control.

On 20 August 1962, the Howze Board proposed significant changes to Army doctrine, including the use of helicopters for reconnaissance, command and control, troop transport, attack gunships, aerial rocket artillery, medical evacuation, and supply. In response, Sullivan suggested to his superiors at ARADMAC that the Army should build a ship-based helicopter repair facility, similar to the Aircraft Repair Unit-Floating (ARU(F)) of World War II.

Sullivan had fought in World War II during 1942 in New Guinea as a 1LT and air controller in the 107th Quartermaster Company, 126th IR, 32nd Infantry Division, the first to be transported into combat as a division. Wounded in an air crash, he returned to duty and was assigned to an Aviation Ordnance Maintenance Company in Townsend, Australia.

Once Sullivan persuaded his immediate superiors at ARADMAC to support the idea of a floating aviation repair depot, it took him more than two years to win over the heads of the Supply and Maintenance Command and then the Transportation Materiel Command. Sullivan assumed broad responsibility for initial development of a "floating aircraft maintenance facility" (FAMF) and put considerable effort into selling it to senior Army leadership. Sullivan wrote a number of reports and held conferences to advance his idea. He spent so much time in Washington D.C. that he was given a second office there. Sullivan made trips to Germany, Vietnam, Korea, Japan, Hawaii, both coasts of the United States and many bases between, gathering information.

Sullivan then successfully sought the attention and approval of General Frank S. Besson, who had recently been appointed as commanding officer of the newly formed United States Army Materiel Command (AMC). The formation of AMC represented a major reorganization within the Army, consolidating all seven Army technical services: the Offices of the Quartermaster General, the Chief of Ordnance, the Chief of Engineers, the Surgeon General, the Chief Signal Officer, the Chief Chemical Officer, and the Chief of Transportation. Besson's success later resulted in his receiving the Merit Award of the Armed Forces Management Association in 1963.

On 17 June 1964, Besson relieved LTC Sullivan of his role as Director of Production Control and assigned him full time as project officer of Project Flat Top. In August 1964 Besson directed the Transportation Materiel Command to explore the feasibility of using a ship as a floating maintenance facility to provide helicopter support in the Far East.

=== Ship selection ===
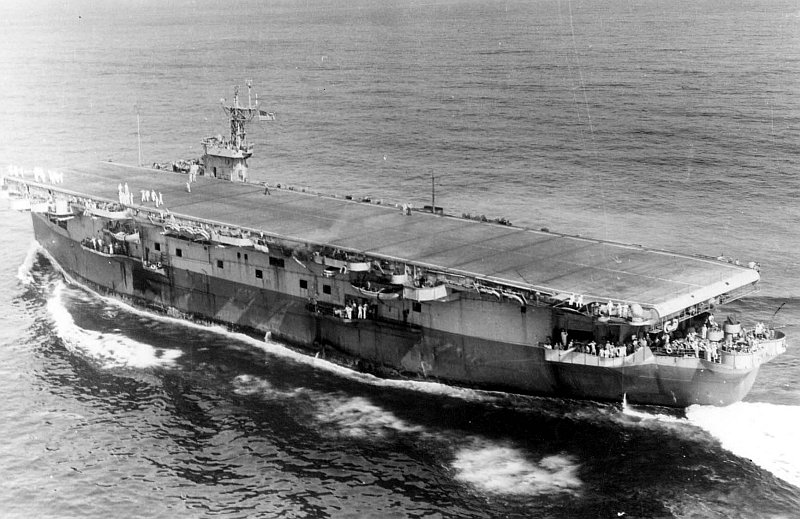
USS Bogue (CVE-9) near Norfolk, Virginia on 20 June 1943 was one ship considered for conversion.

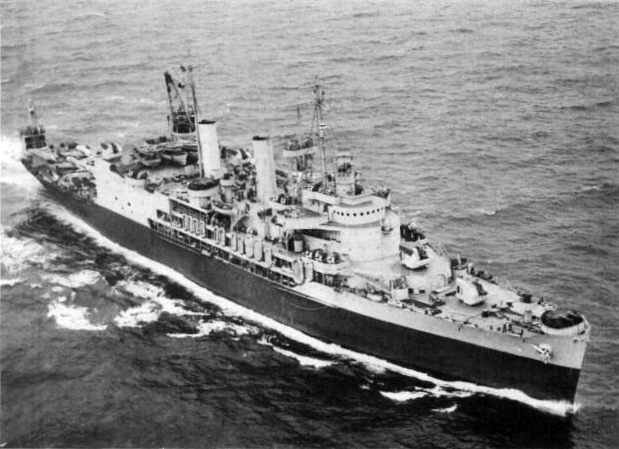
World War II seaplane tender Albemarle, 30 July 1943 was the final choice.

Sullivan's mission was to create a floating aircraft maintenance facility. Choosing a specific ship, planning and designing the changes for its new use, and then converting the ship was a complex, lengthy, frustrating, and expensive effort. Sullivan originally assumed that the selected ship would be one of the US Navy's World War II escort carriers. A special team, including several enlisted men who had started as aircraft mechanics trained by the Air Force in the mid-1950s, crawled through 17 mothballed World War II vessels of all sorts: escort carriers, tank landing ships, cargo ships, and seaplane tenders. They found that the cost of reactivating one of the mothballed escort carriers would be prohibitive.

They also reasoned that the aircraft destined for repair would not be in flying condition anyway and that a seaplane tender already came equipped with some shops. They finally chose the recently decommissioned World War II Curtiss-class seaplane tender USS Albemarle. Compared to a Bogue-class escort carrier, Albemarle was longer: 527 ft 4 in (160.73 m) vs. 495 ft (151 m), drew less water: 21 ft 1 in (6.43 m) vs 23 ft 3 in (7.09 m) vs, and was slightly faster: 20 kn (23 mph; 37 km/h) vs. 18 kn (33 km/h; 21 mph).

Sullivan had to convince the Navy to give up a vessel to another service branch, which was highly unusual, particularly after the interservice difficulties following the establishment of the United States Air Force when the Army wanted organic fixed-wing aviation assets. The Army, which had been accused by the Air Force of beginning another "Air Corps", found the Navy wary of the Army's attempts to get its own "aircraft carrier", but the Navy agreed as long as the Army paid the costs of converting the ship.

== Conversion ==
=== Reactivation ===
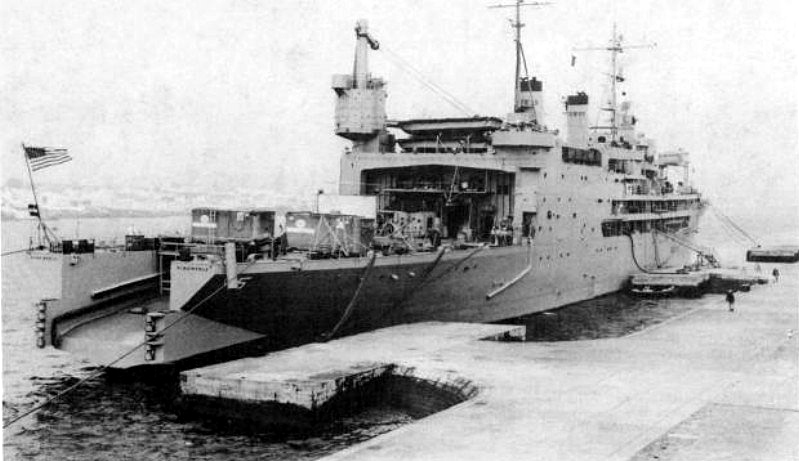
The stern of Albemarle was modified to berth Martin P6M Seamaster flying boats.

Albemarle was laid down in Camden, New Jersey by the New York Shipbuilding Company on 12 June 1939. She was launched on 13 July 1940 and was commissioned into the fleet on 20 December 1940 as USS Albemarle (AV-5).

On 6 February 1956, Albemarle was selected for conversion to tend Martin P6M Seamaster jet flying boats. During the transformation, the aft portion of the ship was lowered to berth a seaplane. The ship was equipped to serve as a highly mobile seadrome capable of supporting jet seaplanes anywhere. Albemarle was recommissioned at Philadelphia on 21 October 1957. The Seamaster program was cancelled in 21 August 1959 before the ship had a chance to carry out its new mission.

After nearly two decades of service as a Curtiss-class seaplane tender, Albemarle was decommissioned on 21 October 1960. She was consigned to the Norfolk group of the Atlantic Reserve Fleet and later transferred to the James River, Reserve Fleet. She was struck from the Naval Vessel Register on 1 September 1962.

On 7 April 1964, Albemarle was moved from the James River Fleet near Fort Eustis in Newport News, Virginia. On 7 August 1964, the United States Maritime Administration transferred the ship, earmarked for conversion to a floating aeronautical maintenance facility for helicopters, back to the Navy. On 27 March 1965 the ship was reinstated on the Navy Vessel Register and on 16 April 1965 she received a new name and classification as USNS Corpus Christi Bay (T-ARVH-1), named for Corpus Christi Bay, the ship's future home port. The ship's designation, "T-ARVH-1", classifies the ship as (T) civilian-crewed (USMM), (AR) repair ship, (V) aircraft, (H) helicopter and, (1) the first in a series. The ship was transferred to Military Sealift Command (MSC) on 11 January 1966. By law, MSC ships are not commissioned warships, are unarmed, and are prefixed with "USNS", for United States Naval Ship, instead of "USS", for United States Ship.

=== Design and construction issues ===
The project team had to design multiple shops. This was a cumbersome process because of the technology at the time. For each design, craftsmen built a three-dimensional model that was used to estimate funding required. Sullivan continued to advance his idea up the chain of command to the Department of the Army and then the Department of Defense. The project slowed down for almost a year and threatened to stall altogether over a host of issues, including legal gray area issues about a civilian crew under the Geneva Convention in a combat zone, the costs of conversion, and interservice concerns.

Eventually Sullivan contacted Congressman Mendel Rivers of South Carolina, chairman of the House Armed Services Committee. Rivers was an ardent supporter of the military and the war in Vietnam. Sullivan talked to Rivers about using the Charleston Naval Shipyard in his district for the ship conversion project. Rivers believed that Congress should set the priorities for the Secretary of Defense and he successfully persuaded Robert McNamara to support the project.

Sullivan repeatedly traveled between ARADMAC in Corpus Christi, the shipyard in Charleston, and the Pentagon in Washington D.C. to resolve the many challenges inherent in converting Albemarle to a floating helicopter repair depot. The project's initial cost, estimated at less than $5 million, ballooned with design changes to $25 million (equivalent to $249.45 million in 2024). The ship also required standing up two Aircraft Maintenance Battalions. The battalions would alternate manning the ship and augmenting the ARADMAC at Corpus Christi when not deployed.

When complete, the ship would provide services equal to those found at ARADMAC. At its peak, ARADMAC was the largest helicopter repair facility on Earth. ARADMAC was renamed in 1974 as the Corpus Christi Army Depot.

=== New shops and facilities ===
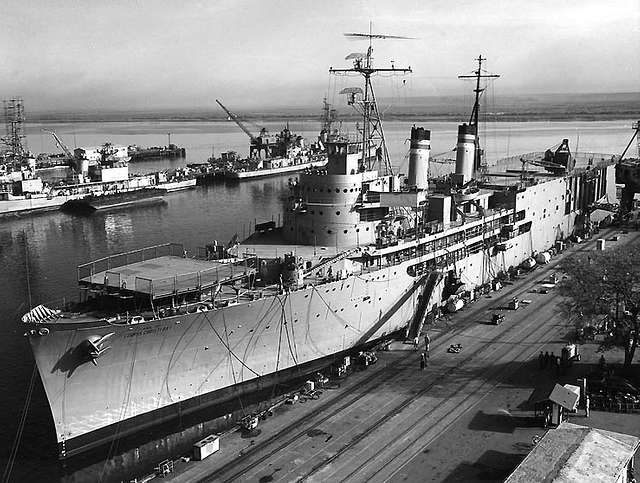
Corpus Christi Bay in the Charleston Naval Shipyard

Along with his offices at ARADMAC in Corpus Christi and in Washington D.C., Sullivan set up an office in the Charleston shipyard and another in the Charleston Army Depot where production equipment was received.

The entire project, from design to launch, took 3½ years. The conversion work aboard the ship in the Charleston Naval Shipyard in North Charleston, South Carolina took 15 months and employed up to 1,000 workers.

Corpus Christi Bay emerged from the yard only faintly resembling her former self. The entire stern transom area and the prominent seaplane ramp aft was replaced by a built-up superstructure topped by a 50 by 150 feet (15 m × 46 m) helicopter landing pad. A smaller forward deck pad was used by helicopters that were not being repaired. The hangar bay was 180 by 82 feet (55 m × 25 m) and 26 feet (7.9 m) high. All remaining seaplane-related structures and equipment along with all World War II weapons, electronics, rangefinders, magazines, and support gear were removed.

Two 22 short tons (20 t) cranes were added to lift equipment and aircraft onto and off the ship. The redesigned ship contained 42,000 square feet (3,900 m^{2}) of workshops and 112,400 cubic feet (3,180 m^{3}) of storage. The interior provided space for 26 production and 16 support shops, including limited airframe repair, engine overhaul repair, rebuilding, and test, transmission repair and test, a hydraulics shop, a sheet metal shop, a gunsmith, a foundry, an electronics shop, and others. The ship was fitted with equipment ranging from hand tools to a USD$3 million, 36-ton test instrument. The shops included engine test stands where helicopter turboshaft engines could be run up to speed. About $2.5 million was spent on more than 8,000 specialized tools and equipment.

Two unusual innovations were implemented on the ship. The first was an IBM 360/20 16 bit computer with 32 KB core memory. Computers aboard warships were extremely new and it was at the time one of the most powerful computers ever sent to sea. The computer was used to manage an extensive technical library and inventory. The second innovation was the technical data library that contained a complete set of 180,000 engineer drawings on film of aircraft systems, components, and special tools. The 20 by 30 feet (6.1 m × 9.1 m) library duplicated the library in Corpus Christi and included 35mm aperture cards that allowed staff to print blueprints that they could take to the shop and use to fabricate the part. It was the only such printer in Vietnam. The library contained 785,000 images that could be broadcast to shops on the ship via closed circuit TV.

There was an internal communications system that allowed multiple shops to talk with each other and production control about their work. This allowed the shops to respond in real-time to requests for repairs and quickly make decisions about whether they could immediately accommodate a request or if they needed additional parts. Previously, damaged helicopters had to be transported 8,000 miles (13,000 km) back to the US for refit; with the advent of this new ship type, repairs could be accomplished near the forward areas. Damaged helicopter components could be barged out to the ship and lifted on board by one of the cranes or flown out via helicopter. The Army estimated it would save 30 percent on the cost of repairing components by completing the work aboard the ship.

While the ship was rebuilt, soldiers received extensive training to manage the various shops. One of the crew, a sheet metal fabricator and airframe repairman, received a year of training in airframe repair and sheet metal work at Fort Eustis, Virginia. He then received an additional year of training at the Army aircraft maintenance facility in Corpus Christi, as did most soldiers who served on the ship.

The ship conversion was completed in December 1965 and the ship arrived in Corpus Christi Bay on 23 January 1966. During sea trials, the inspection team found that the ship was excessively top-heavy due to the new superstructure aft. To resolve this, they poured in several tons of concrete ballast.

== Deployed to South Vietnam ==
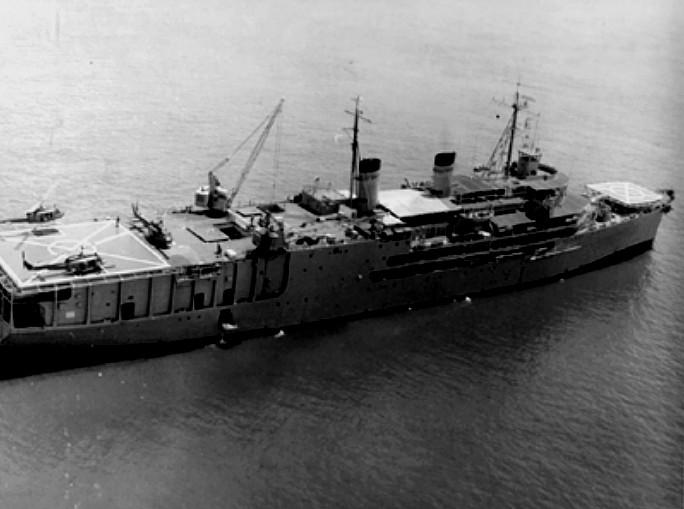
Military Sealift Command helicopter repair ship Corpus Christi Bay at anchor off Vũng Tàu, South Vietnam.

=== In-theatre aviation support ===
On 18 February 1966 the ship sailed for South Vietnam. After a six week transit, the ship arrived in Cam Ranh Bay on 2 April 1966 and began 6½ years of service.

Cam Ranh Bay was chosen because it was the largest harbor facility in South Vietnam. In March 1967 she moved to Vũng Tàu from which she would periodically move up the coast of South Vietnam to Quy Nhon and Da Nang. On these trips, cargo was unloaded and unserviceable components taken aboard. Later on the ship moved back to Quy Nhon to be closer to the 1st Cavalry. The ship moved back to Vũng Tàu in 1970 which was in the vicinity of the parent 34th General Support Group and operated about 1 mile (1.6 km) off the coast.

To avoid a repeat of the successful sapper attack on the escort carrier turned helicopter transport USS Card, security procedures were stepped up while in port. Helmets and flak jackets were kept at the ready topside, sandbags were placed around the bridge, screens were secured over portholes, bilge and ballast pumps were kept warmed up, and extra medical kits and firefighting equipment was kept ready. While the civilian merchant marine crew could not bear arms, the soldiers had been trained to handle weapons and maintained a large arms locker that included replacement M60 machine guns for the Huey gunships.

=== Crew and operations ===
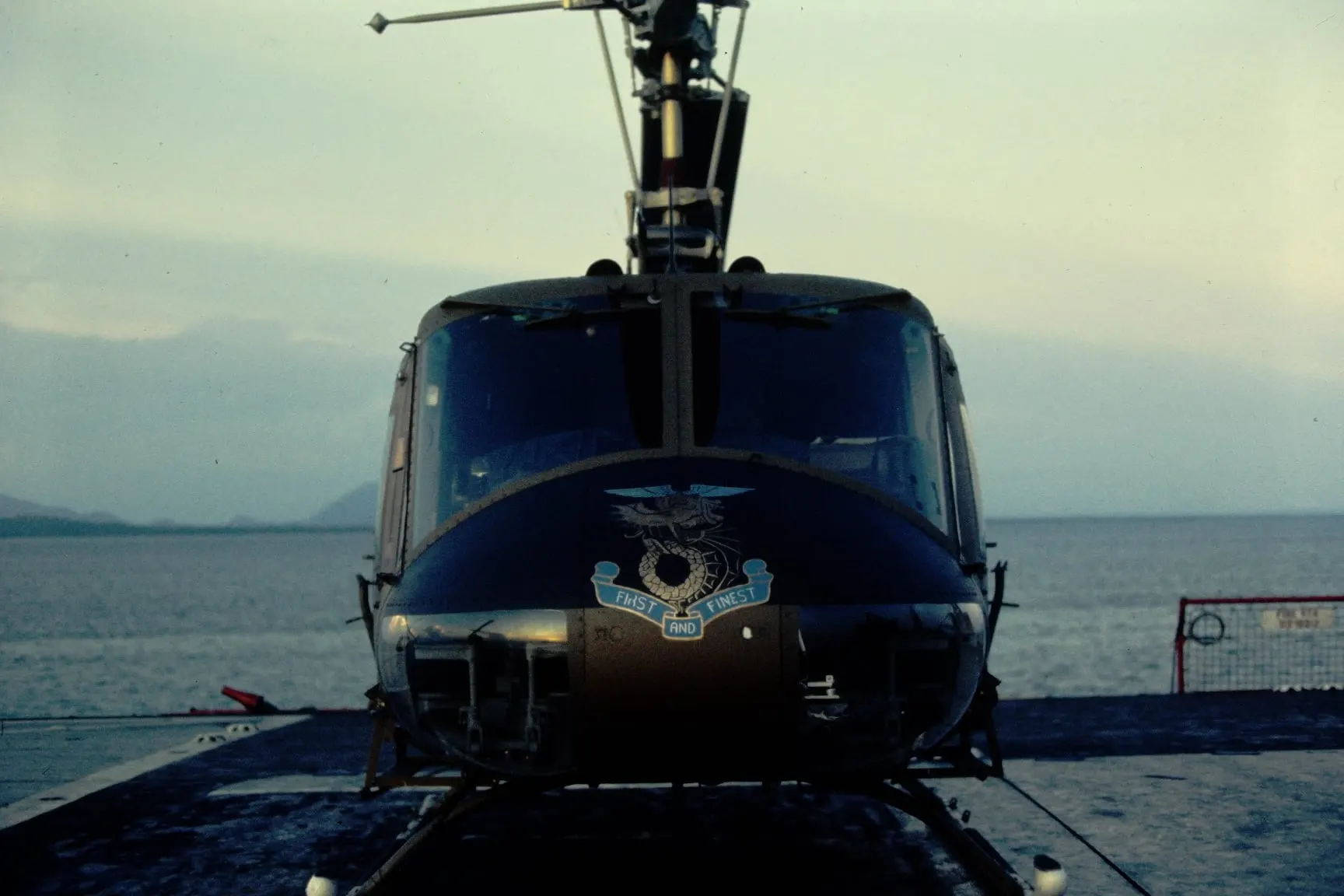
A Huey helicopter assigned to Corpus Christi Bay. The nose art is the unit crest of the 1st Transportation Battalion (Aircraft Maintenance Depot, Seaborne).

The first commander of Corpus Christi Bay was Captain Harry Anderson. He had a crew of 129 civilian merchant marine crew under the Military Sea Transport Service (MSTS), a fraction of the ship's original complement of 1,135 crew members assigned to her during World War II. They manned the bridge, the engine room, and the ship's watches.

The aircraft maintenance facilities aboard the ship were operated by the First Transportation Battalion (Seaborne), commanded by LTC Harry O. Davis, US Army, with 308 aircraft technicians, specialists and mechanics. There were 19 officers, 11 warrant officers, and 350 enlisted men.

The Army formed the 1st Material Group on 26 May 1966, the first of its kind in the Army Material Command, and named COL Sullivan as its commander. On 7 October 1966, the Second Transportation Battalion (Seaborne) was formed at ARADMAC. Sullivan presented the unit's new colors to its commanding officer, LTC John Bergner on 8 October 1966. The unit was trained in Corpus Christi to prepare all personnel who would deploy to serve aboard the ship. The two battalions initially rotated about every 12 months from Corpus Christi to South Vietnam, until deployments were phased in year-round.

In May 1967, Colonel (COL) Morgan C. Light assumed management of the 1st Material Group and Project FLATTOP, replacing COL Sullivan. Sullivan was transferred to head the Aviation Maintenance Depot for HQ US Army Europe in Mannheim, Germany.

=== Ship fails audit ===
In late 1969, the Army Audit Agency notified the ship's commander that Corpus Christi Bay was being recalled to the United States. The commander was informed that during the 1967 fiscal year the ship had failed to attain a Pentagon goal for parts repaired. ARADMAC strongly resisted the criticism of the ship's cost-effectiveness and the accuracy of the audit. Costs were in part controlled by the archaic procurement processes used by the federal government. The value of the ship's work varied depending on which organization was evaluating the cost. Production fell under two accounts, one type the Army in Vietnam paid for directly, while the other it didn't. The ship remained in South Vietnam while the recall was appealed and it was eventually overturned.

=== Services available ===
Corpus Christi Bay had the largest and best equipped fabrication facilities in Vietnam, including milling machines, lathes, molten-salt heat-treating ovens, metal-plating, chemical and metallurgical testing, and presses. Her shops provided the highest echelon of repair services to Army aircraft. Every piece that came through the ship's shops was restored to factory specifications. These included components such as engines, avionics, and armament. The ship also provided a chemical laboratory in which soldiers could test the purity and viscosity of lubricants and hydraulic fluids.

The ship's crew supported numerous other systems aside from aircraft. They conducted a limited fabrication program, including some non-aviation items and special projects. They manufactured flash suppressors for machine guns, skid shoes for the OH-6A Light Observation Helicopter, and helicopter flare racks that could be jettisoned. They manufactured parts for the Patrol Air Cushion Vehicles which were relatively few in number and thus had a hard time obtaining parts. There was such a demand for hydraulic tubing and fuel lines that they fabricated them and kept them in inventory.

The ship could perform all the maintenance functions of the depot level aircraft maintenance facility at Corpus Christi, including overhauling and rebuilding aircraft components, directly in service to Military Assistance Command, Vietnam. Production increased slowly and stayed below planned through mid-1967 but was still highly valuable. The work avoided costs and, more importantly, returned aircraft to use more quickly. One veteran said, "The guys aboard this FAMF could fix anything."

=== Expedited repair ===
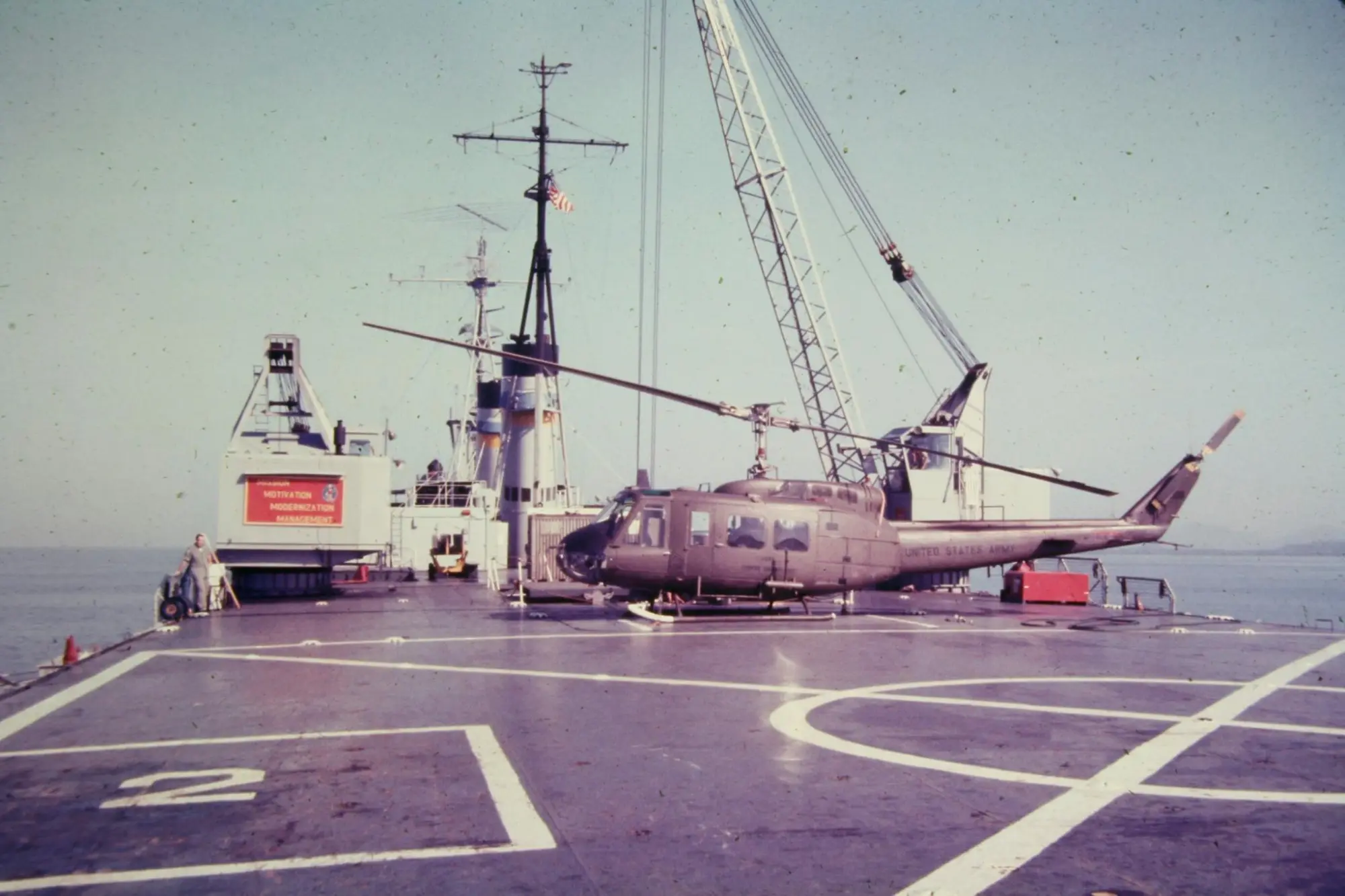
One of two Hueys assigned to Corpus Christi Bay

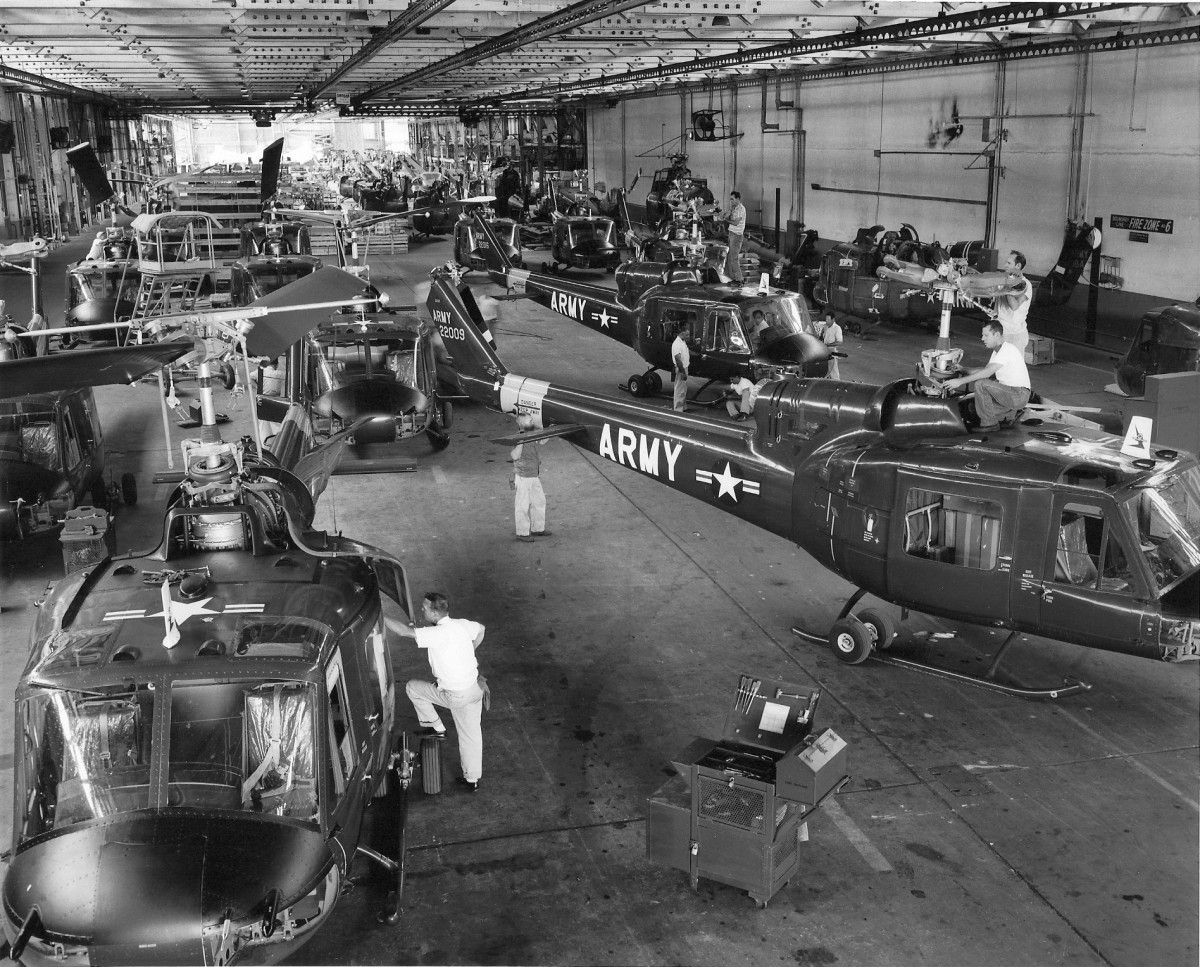
Huey helicopters under repair at the Corpus Christi Army Depot

She had two UH-1s assigned to the ship for administrative use and transporting light supplies and picking up and delivering light aircraft components. Flattop 086 (68-16086) and Flattop 045 (69-15045) each had its own operating and maintenance crews.

During the height of the ship's service off Vietnam, crewmen worked three shifts to repair helicopter parts. Each shop was responsible for maintaining its repair parts listing, program, and production, and was expected to operate on a 24-hour schedule.

Due to space constraints, the men's goal was to turn around as many unserviceable components as quickly as possible. They prioritized repairing the components that required the least amount of work and sent the components that required the greatest amount of work back to Corpus Christi. To maintain maximum aircraft readiness, they also responded to urgent requirements if a component was grounding an aircraft.

Instead of flying entire helicopters onto the ship, it was preferable to extract aircraft and helicopter components or sub-components ashore and then bring them aboard. They were sometimes brought to the ship via helicopter, but they were typically delivered by an amtruc (wheeled 15-ton amphibious truck) or a “mike boat” (converted WWII landing craft). A barge was often tied alongside to allow the amtruc or boat to moor in a position that allowed the crane operator better visibility.

The ship could repair minor damage to airframes, but if airframe was badly damaged, it was sent to Texas. When sent aboard a ship, the aircraft had to be wrapped in "Spraylot" (shrink-wrapped) coverings to protect it against the elements. The Army experimented with doped fabric, then blown plastic, and finally peel-off plastic to protect the aircraft while in transit. Space had to be found aboard one of the Seatrain chartered freighters or one of the converted World War II escort carriers such as USNS Croatan. Then it took 18 days to ship the helicopter across the Pacific and through the Panama Canal to the ARADMAC in Corpus Christi. Once repairs were complete, the process had to be reversed. A repair that required a week of real-time labor could end up taking two months.

On 1 April 1968, to lessen the time it took to return aircraft to service, the Army began to use Air Force C-133 and C-141 cargo aircraft of the Military Airlift Command to transport damaged helicopters, engines, and component parts to and from Vietnam. If Corpus Christi Bay did not have the necessary parts, they requested them from Texas. If the parts were deemed high priority, they were put aboard the C-133 or C-141 aircraft that were transporting repaired aircraft back to Vietnam. In 1968, ARADMAC inaugurated a Department of the Army approved Special Assignment Airlift Mission (SAAM) which involved the direct airlift of helicopter engines to South Vietnam. They were delivered to the Aviation Materiel Management Center (AMMC) depots. By the end of the year, 3,169 engines had been airlifted in 88 flights. In some circumstances they could pick up parts at Tan Son Nhut Air Base or Bien Hoa Air Base airport less than 48 hours after requesting them.

=== Shore teams ===
The crew provided contact teams nicknamed "Sand Crabs" that worked ashore. They gathered parts needing repair as they were sent in by combat units, boxed them up, and transported them aboard an amphibious boat to the ship. Service members also went ashore regularly to provide medical care, food, gifts, clothing, and toys at a Vietnamese orphanage near Cam Ranh Bay. They built a building to house the orphans and provided 60 beds, among other projects.

== Final disposition ==
The ship left South Vietnam in late 1972 and was given one more mission; during Operation Hula Hoop 73, the ship, along with USNS Wheeling (T-AGM-8), monitored French nuclear tests in the Tuamotu Archipelago. The Army troops were flown directly back to Texas. Only the civilian maritime crew remained aboard. During the voyage, the ship was hit by a typhoon that caused a crack in the hull. En route to Mururoa, the ship began to leak so badly that she needed immediate repair. Relying on the Law of the sea that allows a ship in distress to enter the nearest port, she anchored at Papeete on Tahiti, French Polynesia. A US Navy repair crew was sent from Pearl Harbor to patch the ship. While returning to the US, she stopped in Guam and Hawaii.

Corpus Christi Bay traversed the Panama Canal and sailed to her home base of Corpus Christi, arriving on 19 December 1972. Upon inspection in Charleston, the condition and age of the ship did not warrant the expense of further repair. The ship was ultimately determined by Military Sealift Command to be "in excess of current and future requirements". Corpus Christi Bay was taken out of service in 1973 and berthed in ready reserve status at Corpus Christi.

By mid-1974 a host of factors converged and led HQDA to reject continuing use of the ship. Among considerations were direct costs of maintaining the ship due to fiscal constraints in the drawdown after the end of the Vietnam war, the increasing promise of being able to air transport aircraft to temporary repair facilities, and eliminating the cost of the two battalions. The ship was finally struck from the Naval Vessel Register on 31 December 1974, and on 8 January 1975 the ship left Corpus Christi for further disposal. On 17 July 1975, Brownsville Steel and Salvage, Inc. paid $387,766 (equivalent to $1,750,247 in 2024) to scrap the ship.

== Legacy ==
The Floating Aircraft Maintenance Facility allowed the Army to repair helicopters in-theater instead of shipping them back to Corpus Christi in the United States. Transporting damaged aircraft back to the United States for repairs was an expensive, logistical nightmare. The ship returned deadlined aircraft in an average of six days compared to 18 days for aircraft returned to the continental United States. The ship repaired as many as 20,000 aircraft components a month and saved the military millions of dollars.

Productivity peaked in late 1969 and early 1970 when the soldiers repaired helicopter parts valued at roughly $3.76 million (equivalent to $24.6 million in 2024) each month. Over the term of her service off the shore of Vietnam, the ship repaired about 270,000 items valued at $220 million (equivalent to $1.1 billion in 2021). This more than offset the cost of building and equipping the ship.

== Awards ==
The First Transportation Corps Battalion (Aircraft Maintenance Depot) (Seaborne) earned four Meritorious Unit Commendations. The ship and its military crew was also awarded the National Defense Service Medal, the Vietnam Service Medal, and the Republic of Vietnam Campaign Medal. A plaque dedicated to her stated:

CORPUS CHRISTI BAY (T-ARVH-1)
ACTIVATED AND CONVERTED AT THE
CHARLESTON NAVAL SHIPYARD
AUGUST 1964-DECEMBER 1965
FROM THE MEN WHO DID THEIR BEST
TO MAKE HER THE BEST
TO SERVE THE BEST

The ship’s bell, a scale model of the ship and other artifacts are displayed at the Corpus Christi Army Depot in Texas. The US Army Transportation Museum revealed a large scale model of Corpus Christi Bay in September 2021.

On 8 July 1967, COL Sullivan was awarded the Legion of Merit, the US Army's second highest non-combat award, by GEN Frank Besson. He was cited for "developing a new versatile, mobile depot maintenance capability." He was credited with the planning, creativity, management ability, and leadership that made the ship available during the peak period when aircraft maintenance was initially needed in 1966.

Initial plans called for a second floating aircraft maintenance depot to be named the USNS Oso Bay. The ship was to be an escort carrier with a flight hangar built on the deck. After the cost of converting Albemarle ballooned, the second ship was considered cost prohibitive and never implemented. Interservice rivalries led to some criticism of the success of Corpus Christi Bay. But according to a special operational report on the 34th Support Group published in November 1969, the efforts of the 1st Transportation Battalion made it possible for the US Army to "maintain helicopters in numbers sufficient to meet the full range of combat operations."
