= VPB-214 =

Patrol Bombing Squadron 214
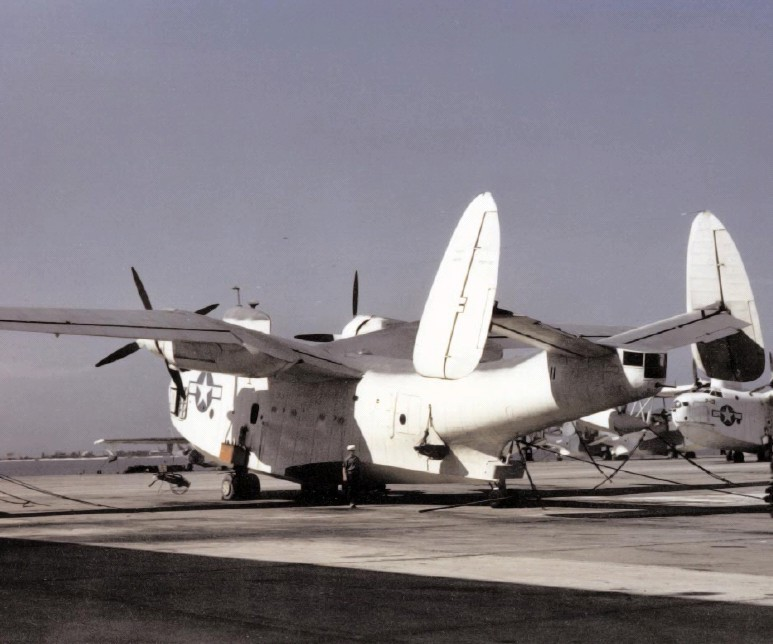
- VPB-214 PBM-3S at NAS Norfolk in 1944
- Active: 18 October 1943 – 21 June 1945
- Country: United States of America
- Branch: United States Navy
- Type: squadron
- Role: Maritime patrol
- Engagements: World War II

Aircraft flown
- Patrol: PBM-3S

VPB-214 was a Patrol Bombing Squadron of the U.S. Navy. The squadron was established as Patrol Squadron Two Hundred Fourteen (VP-214) on 18 October 1943, redesignated Patrol Bombing Squadron Two Hundred Fourteen (VPB-214) on 1 October 1944 and disestablished on 21 June 1945.

== Operational history ==
- 18 October 1943 – 8 January 1944: VP-214, a medium seaplane squadron flying the PBM-3S Mariner, was established at NAAS Harvey Point, North Carolina, under the operational control of FAW-5. Training was conducted at Harvey Point through December 1943. On 8 January 1944, the squadron was transferred to NAS Key West, Florida, for shakedown and advanced training in Anti-submarine warfare (ASW).
- 22 January 1944: The squadron's first loss in training occurred when Lieutenant Francis Mitchell and his crew crashed during a practice drop of live ordnance. The cluster of depth charges exploded upon impact with the water, removing the tail of the aircraft. Four crewmembers were killed.
- 23 January 1944: VP-214 became operational at NAS Norfolk, Virginia, while based ashore at Breezy Point. Duties included convoy escort and ASW sweeps of the offshore approaches.
- 12 September 1944: VP-214 was deployed to NAS Guantanamo Bay, Cuba, under the operational control of FAW-11. Duties consisted of convoy escort and ASW sweeps of the approaches to the Caribbean basin.
- 1 October 1944: The squadron complement of aircraft was reduced from 12 to 9, with a corresponding reduction in personnel.
- 15 January–April 1945: VPB-214 was transferred to NAS Coco Solo, Panama Canal Zone, under the operational control of FAW-3. On 18 February the squadron was based aboard the tender USS Albemarle at Almirante Bay, Panama, for advanced base operations. The squadron returned to NAS Coco Solo on 1 March. On 1 April the squadron began flying a series of ASW sectors on the Pacific side of the canal from NAS Coco Solo to the Galapagos Islands to Corinto, Nicaragua and back to Coco Solo.
- 31 May 1945: Orders were received to turn in all of the squadron's aircraft and assets to HEDRON-3 at NAS Coco Solo and proceed to NAS Norfolk for disestablishment. The squadron personnel were put aboard USS Sangamon for return to Norfolk. The squadron's aircraft were later towed out to sea and used as strafing targets by the Army Air Force fighters.
- 18 June 1945: VPB-214 was disestablished at NAS Norfolk.

== Home port assignments ==
The squadron was assigned to these home ports, effective on the dates shown:

- NAAS Harvey Point, North Carolina 18 October 1943
- NAS Key West, Florida 8 January 1944
- NAS Norfolk, Virginia 23 January 1944
- NAS Guantanamo Bay, Cuba 12 September 1944
- NAS Coco Solo, Panama Canal Zone 15 January 1945
- NAS Norfolk, 31 May 1945

== See also ==
- Maritime patrol aircraft
- List of inactive United States Navy aircraft squadrons
- List of United States Navy aircraft squadrons
- List of squadrons in the Dictionary of American Naval Aviation Squadrons
- History of the United States Navy
