= USS Albemarle (AV-5) =

Curtiss-class seaplane tender ship

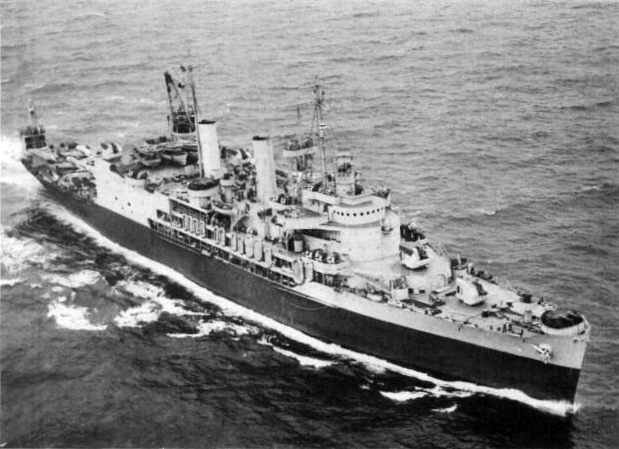
- USS Albemarle (AV-5), 30 July 1943, in Measure 21 (Navy blue/haze gray) camouflage.

History

United States
- Name: USS Albemarle 1939–1960; USNS Corpus Christi Bay, 1963–1974
- Namesake: Albemarle Sound in North Carolina / Albemarle County, Virginia; Corpus Christi Bay in Texas
- Builder: New York Shipbuilding Corporation, Camden, New Jersey
- Laid down: 12 June 1939
- Launched: 13 July 1940
- Commissioned: 20 December 1940
- Decommissioned: 14 August 1950
- Recommissioned: 21 October 1957
- Decommissioned: 21 October 1960
- In service: January 1966
- Out of service: 1973
- Stricken: 31 December 1974
- Fate: Sold for scrapping, 17 July 1975

General characteristics
- Class & type: Curtiss class seaplane tender
- Displacement: 8,671 long tons (8,810 t)
- Length: 527 ft 4 in (160.73 m)
- Beam: 69 ft 3 in (21.11 m)
- Draft: 21 ft 1 in (6.43 m)
- Installed power: 4 × turbo-drive 500 kW 450 V A.C. service generators
- Propulsion: 2 × New York Shipbuilding Parsons-type geared turbines, 12,000 shp (8,948 kW); 4 × Babcock & Wilcox boilers; Double De Laval main reduction gears; 2 × propellers
- Speed: 20 kn (23 mph; 37 km/h)
- Complement: 1,195 officers and enlisted men (AV); 128 civilians, 308 Army technicians (ARVH)
- Armament: 4 × 5"/38 dual-purpose gun mounts; 16 × 40 mm AA guns (4x4) (AV, "as-built"); 2 × dual 40 mm AA gun mounts; 12 × 20 mm AA gun mounts (AV, added during World War II); No armament as ARVH

USS Albemarle (AV-5) was one of only two Curtiss-class seaplane tenders built for the United States Navy just prior to the United States' entry into World War II. Named for Albemarle Sound on the North Carolina coast, she was the third U.S. Naval vessel to bear the name. Albemarle was laid down on 12 June 1939 at Camden, New Jersey, by the New York Shipbuilding Corporation, and launched on 13 July 1940, sponsored by Mrs. Beatrice C. Compton, the wife of the Honorable Lewis Compton, Assistant Secretary of the Navy. She was commissioned at the Philadelphia Navy Yard on 20 December 1940, with Commander Henry M. Mullinnix in command. She was transferred to the Maritime Administration (MARAD) James River Fleet at Fort Eustis, Virginia. Placed in the custodial care of MARAD, Albemarle was struck from the Naval Vessel Register on 1 September 1962.

On 27 March 1965, the ship was reinstated on the Navy Vessel Register and received a new name and classification as USNS Corpus Christi Bay (T-ARVH-1), named for Corpus Christi Bay in the southern Texas Coastal Bend; the ship was transferred to the Military Sealift Command (MSC) on 11 January 1966. Converted at the Charleston Naval Shipyard to an Aircraft Repair Ship, Helicopter, the conversion project was nicknamed Project Flat Top. The seaplane ramp was replaced by a superstructure topped with a helicopter landing pad. The ship was fitted out with dozens of shops and equipment necessary to repair and maintain helicopters. During the Vietnam War Corpus Christi Bay participated in several campaigns from 1966 to 1969. Last anchored off Vung Tau, the ship left for the US in late 1972, stopping at Guam and Hawaii before transiting the Panama Canal and returning to its home base at Corpus Christi, Texas, arriving in December 1972. The ship was once again struck from the Naval Vessel Register on 31 December 1974. On 17 July 1975, the ship was sold to Brownsville (Texas) Steel and Salvage, Inc. for scrapping.

== Equipment ==
The ship was 527 feet (161 m) long, compared to destroyers of the day which were about 300 feet (91 m) long. She had a very wide 69 feet (21 m) beam and drew over three fathoms when fully loaded. Her four high-pressure Babcock & Wilcox boilers turned two geared turbines that could produce a respectable 19.7 knots, faster than most auxiliaries of the day. Her cruising range was 12,000 miles (19,000 km) at 12 knots was sufficient to navigate halfway around the world.

She was equipped with the brand new CXAM radar, the first production radar system deployed on United States Navy. She was protected by four 5"/38 dual-purpose guns, 16 40 mm AA guns, and 12 20 mm anti-aircraft guns.

== Service history ==
=== 1941 ===
Albemarle remained at Philadelphia, fitting out, through mid-January 1941. Underway for Newport, Rhode Island on the morning of 28 January, the seaplane tender arrived at her destination on the 30th, and loaded torpedoes. She sailed the following day for Norfolk, Virginia, arriving on 1 February and, over the ensuing days, remained in that area, loading bombs and pyrotechnics and calibrating her degaussing gear, before she sailed on her shakedown cruise on the afternoon of 6 February, setting course for Guantanamo Bay Naval Base. The seaplane tender shifted thence to Havana on the morning of 18 February, and over the days which followed her captain made the usual formal calls dictated by diplomatic protocol. In Havana harbor, Albemarle dressed ship for Washington's Birthday, her 21-gun salute to the American national holiday returned gun-for-gun by the Cuban gunboat Yarn. On the morning of 24 February, the ship got underway for the Panama Canal Zone.

Diverted while en route, Albemarle anchored in the harbor at San Juan, Puerto Rico, on the morning of 28 February, and that afternoon received the official call of Rear Admiral Raymond A. Spruance, Commandant of the 10th Naval District. That same day, she embarked 91 men from Patrol Squadron (VP) 51 and VP-61 from VP-52 for temporary duty and transportation, and sailed for Norfolk on the morning of 2 March. While en route, Commander Mullinnix was relieved as commanding officer by Commander H. B. Sallada. Albemarle moored at Pier 7, Naval Operating Base (NOB), Norfolk, on the afternoon of 5 March, but lingered there for less than a day, getting underway the following afternoon for Philadelphia. She returned to the Philadelphia Navy Yard and spent the rest of March there, undergoing post-shakedown repairs. The seaplane tender departed Philadelphia on 6 April, and arrived back at Norfolk the following afternoon; there she took on board depth charges and depth bombs. She sailed for Newport on the morning of 10 April, and soon after standing out into international waters past the Virginia Capes, met her escort for the trip – six "flush-deck" destroyers, one of which was the ill-fated Reuben James. That afternoon she fueled two of her escorts, Sturtevant and MacLeish at the same time, the former to starboard, the latter to port.

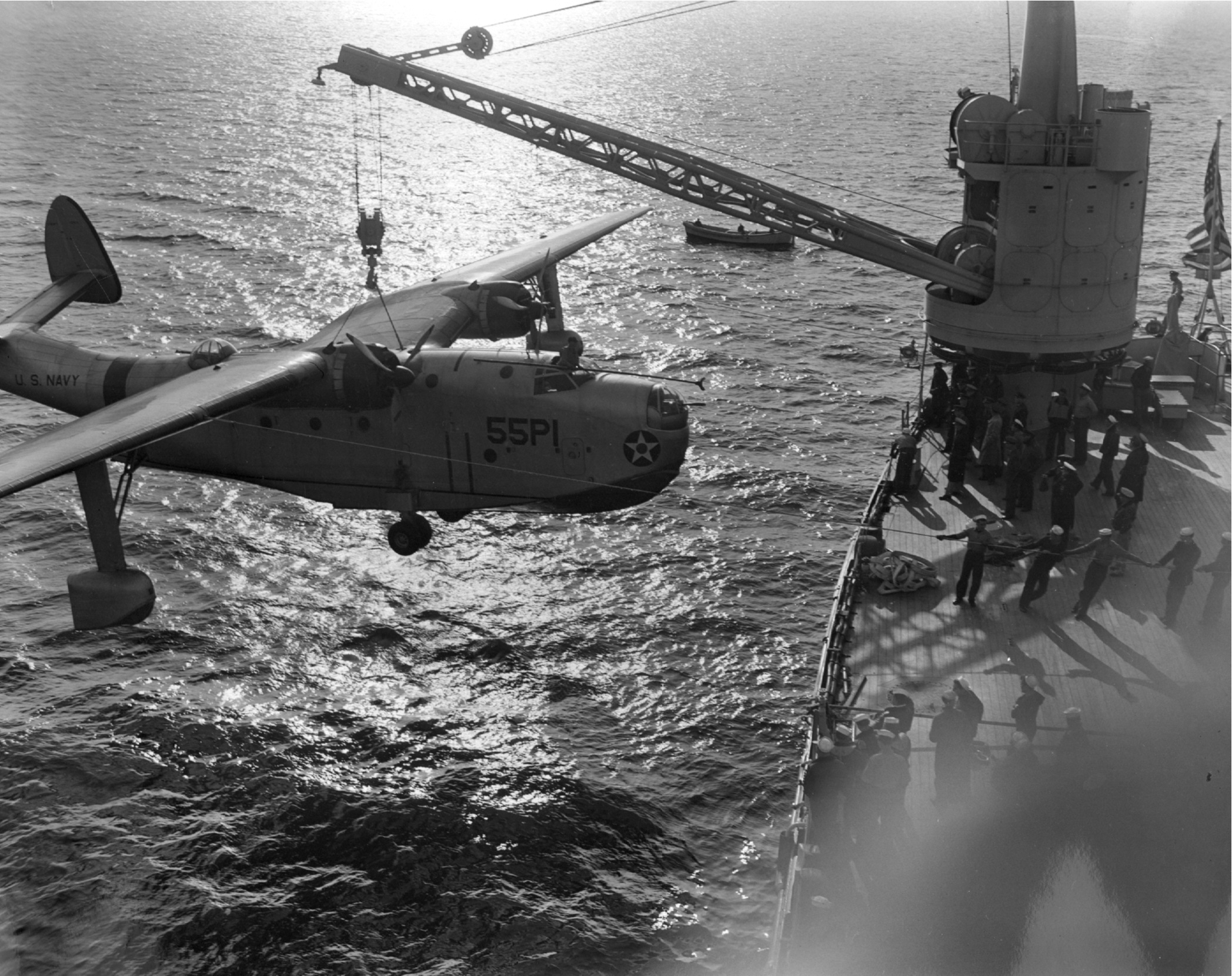
A U.S. Navy Martin PBM-1 Mariner of Patrol Squadron 55 (VP-55) is hoisted on board the USS Albemarle in 1941. The ship is painted in the Neutrality Patrol paint scheme.

Albemarle then anchored in the harbor of refuge, off Block Island, late on the afternoon of 11 April and, accompanied by the destroyer Truxtun, calibrated her radio direction finders. She then set out to finish her voyage up the eastern seaboard to Newport, arriving at her destination late on the afternoon of 13 April. She there joined a host of warships, ranging from the battleship Texas and the heavy cruisers Tuscaloosa and Wichita, to old and new-type destroyers and the destroyer tender Prairie. While Albemarle had been on her shakedown, the U.S. determination to aid the British in the Battle of the Atlantic had resulted in the establishment, on 1 March, of the Support Force, commanded by Rear Admiral Arthur L. Bristol, to protect the vital lifeline between the U.S. and Great Britain in the North Atlantic. It was formed around destroyers and patrol plane squadrons; the latter would be tended by small seaplane tenders (ex-destroyers and ex-minesweepers) and Albemarle. Over the next few days, the seaplane tender operated in local waters, at Narragansett Bay, off Martha's Vineyard and Quonset Point, running drills of various kinds and conducting target practices. Rear Admiral Bristol came on board briefly on 28 April and wore his flag in Albemarle; that same day, she embarked her former commanding officer, now Captain Mullinnix, who was Commander, Patrol Wing, Support Force; men of VP-56 reported on board in connection with advanced base operations, as did men from VP-55. The following day, the planes from those two squadrons commenced night-flying operations.

Albemarle, after again wearing Rear Admiral Bristol's flag on 2 May, departed Newport for Norfolk on 4 May, arriving the following day. The seaplane tender then cleared the Virginia Capes on the morning of 9 May for Newport, and arrived there the following morning. She embarked officers and men of VP-52 on 12 May and then sailed the following morning (13 May) for Naval Station Argentia, Newfoundland. Ultimately anchoring in Little Placentia Bay, Argentia, on the morning of 18 May, Albemarle was soon laying 13 seaplane moorings and gathering data on the weather of the region, establishing the advanced base for VP-52's operations from Argentia. Over the days that followed, in addition to tending the planes assigned to her, she also fueled a succession of destroyers. On 20 May, she received a visit from not only Rear Admiral Bristol – his first visit to Argentia, which he later made his headquarters – but Rear Admiral John H. Towers, the Chief of the Bureau of Aeronautics, who both arrived separately in planes from VP-56. Both flag officers departed the following morning. Twelve PBY Catalinas of VP-52 arrived at Argentia from Quonset Point on 18 May, and immediately commenced familiarization flights in the region – activities which were suddenly cancelled on 24 May. On that day, the Bismarck, which had left Norwegian waters shortly before in company with the Prinz Eugen on what was to be a raiding cruise into the Atlantic, encountered and destroyed the British battle cruiser HMS Hood. An anxious Prime Minister Winston Churchill, concerned over the convoy routes that lay open to the powerful German battleship, immediately cabled President Franklin D. Roosevelt and requested American help.

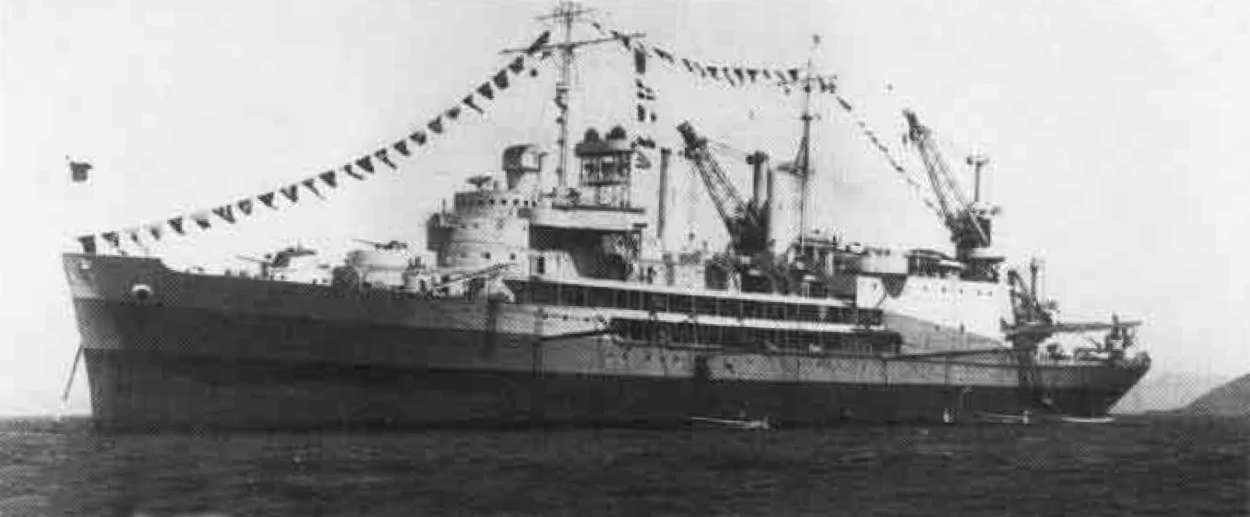
Albemarle at Argentia, Newfoundland, June 1941. Note the seldom used measure 2 camouflage.

Albemarle quickly refueled the aircraft that had been flying training missions that morning and readied others for the urgent mission. At 14:40 the first group of four PBYs lifted off, followed a little less than three hours later, at 17:20, by a second flight of seven. The pilots of the Catalinas were briefed for a long reconnaissance mission that would take them some 500 mi (800 km; 430 nmi) southeast of Cape Farewell, Greenland. They encountered foul weather and very dangerous flying conditions in the course of their extensive searches, did not find their quarry in the murk, and were compelled by the fog and darkness to seek haven at various bays in Newfoundland, Labrador, Quebec, and adjoining islands. Albemarle remained at Argentia until 12 June, when she sailed for Norfolk, arriving on the 15th. There she loaded supplies, stores, ammunition and gasoline, before getting underway to return to Newfoundland on 20 June. Escorted there by the destroyer MacLeish, Albemarle touched at Halifax en route (22 June), and then proceeded on to Argentia, screened by MacLeish and Cole, arriving on 24 June. The seaplane tender supported the operations of VP-71, VP-72 and VP-73 until she sailed again for Norfolk on 19 July, in company with Dallas. Mooring at Pier 7, NOB Norfolk on the morning of the 25th, she shifted to the Norfolk Navy Yard later that same day and remained there, undergoing an availability, until 12 August.

Underway on the day, Albemarle, screened by the destroyer Broome, sailed for Argentia once more, and reach her destination on the 16th, resuming her support of VP-73. She provided support for seaplane and flying boat operations out of Argentia through October 1941. Clearing Little Placentia Harbor on 1 November, Albemarle sailed for Casco Bay, Maine, arriving there on the 3rd; she then pushed on for Norfolk, arriving there on the 7th. On the day that Japanese planes attacked the Pacific Fleet at Pearl Harbor, 7 December 1941, Albemarle lay at NOB Norfolk, embarking passengers before she was scheduled to get underway for anchorage at Lynnhaven Roads. On Christmas Day, 1941 the seaplane tender got underway for Newport and Argentia.

=== 1942 ===
Ultimately, the ship proceeded to Reykjavík, Iceland, where she would encounter the most severe weather she would see in her career. One particular day, 15 January 1942, was memorable. She set her special sea, anchor and steaming watches and put out both anchors with 120 fathoms (220 m) of chain on the starboard and 60 fathoms (110 m) to port, with her main engines turning over and steam up on all boilers. The winds were clocked at 71 kn (82 mph; 131 km/h), with occasional gusts of 95, forcing the tender to drag anchor. The gale lasted until 19 January, and caused heavy damage among the ship's patrol planes. The ship nearly collided with the heavy cruiser Wichita on one occasion, and was in danger of fouling several other ships during that time. Her starboard anchor was fouled once, and she lost the port anchor. She ultimately left Reykjavík on 19 January, steaming initially at greatly reduced speed because of the tempest, shaping course for Argentia, where she would embark passengers for transportation to Norfolk.

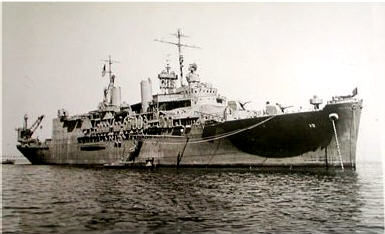
Albemarle at anchor, date and place unknown.

Reaching Norfolk on 29 January, Albemarle then proceeded to Narragansett Bay, and there provided tender services to VP-73 as that squadron worked with torpedoes there. On 5 March, Admiral Royal E. Ingersoll, Commander in Chief, Atlantic Fleet, made an unofficial call and inspected the ship informally. Albemarle completed her work with VP-73 and remained at anchor in Narragansett Bay until 3 April, when she proceeded to the Boston Navy Yard South Annex for an availability.

Her overhaul lasted until 1 May. Upon completion of her refit, Albemarle got underway for Newport, on 5 May, and there, over the next few days, degaussed, calibrated her direction finders, and loaded aircraft for transportation to Bermuda. Underway on 15 May with Mayo and Benson as escorts, the seaplane tender reached her destination on the 17th, unloaded the planes she had brought, and immediately set sail for Narragansett Bay. Relieving Pocomoke in connection with aircraft torpedo and submarine familiarization training, on the 19th, Albemarle remained anchored in Narragansett Bay until 12 August, providing torpedo services for a succession of squadrons: VP-94, VP-34, VP-33 and Torpedo Squadron 4. Underway on 12 August and escorted by the destroyers Livermore, Kearny and Rowan, the submarine tender sailed for Norfolk. After her arrival there, Albemarle conducted gunnery exercises in the Chesapeake Bay operating area.

Shortly thereafter, escorted by Fletcher and O'Bannon, Albemarle sailed for the Canal Zone on 5 September 1942. Damaging her starboard screw at Coco Solo, the seaplane tender was ordered drydocked for repairs; after transiting the Panama Canal for the first time on 15 September, she entered dry dock at Balboa on the following day. Upon completion of repairs, she transported Army troops and marines to Rio Hato, Panama, for two days of joint Army-Navy maneuvers. Over the next several months, Albemarle acted as fast transport of aeronautical material and men to naval air bases in the Caribbean and the Pacific coast of South America, as well as in the northern South Atlantic. During this time (September–November 1942), she visited Salinas, Ecuador; the air base at Seymour Island, in the Galápagos Islands; San Juan and Bermuda, primarily operating out of Colon and Balboa and escorted by the seaplane tender Goldsborough. Relieved on station by the seaplane tender Pocomoke, Albemarle sailed from the Canal Zone on 13 November escorted by Goldsborough and the small seaplane tender Matagorda. Proceeding via San Juan, Trinidad and Tobago and Bermuda, the seaplane tender reached Hampton Roads on 30 November having completed her longest sustained tour of duty outside the continental limits of the U.S.

=== 1943 ===
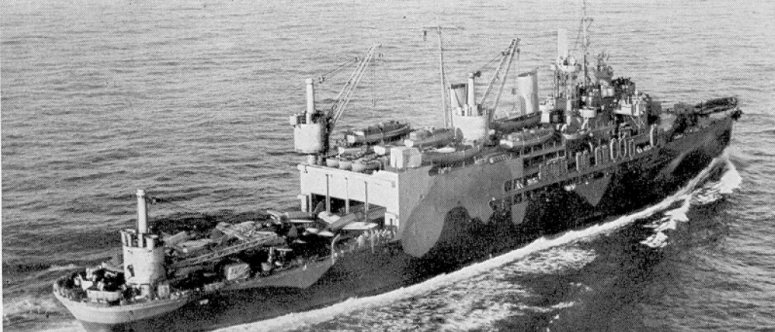
Albemarle underway, 10 June 1943.

Over the next seven months, Albemarle shuttled between Norfolk and Guantánamo Bay, Trinidad, San Juan, and Bermuda, on eight round-trip voyages. She varied this routine only slightly on the sixth and eighth of these, visiting Recife, Brazil for the first time (17–21 April 1943) on the sixth cruise and putting into the Canal Zone on the eighth. Her cargo included aviation gasoline and ammunition. Upon completion of that cycle of operations, she underwent repairs and alterations at the Boston Navy Yard between 15 June and 23 July 1943, departing on the latter date for Norfolk, whence she resumed her cargo-carrying and transport run to Trinidad, Recife, San Juan and Guantánamo Bay. On this voyage, her last on this run, she brought back 27 German prisoners of war, survivors of a sunken U-boat. Underway from Norfolk on 16 September, Albemarle sailed for the British Isles, escorted by the destroyers Bulmer and Barker. Proceeding via Argentia, the seaplane tender reached Swansea, Wales with aeronautical cargo and passengers on 28 September, the men and freight she carried to support the newly inaugurated antisubmarine operations by patrol squadrons operating from the British Isles. Underway from Swansea on 4 October, she scraped a screw while leaving the harbor, and, after sailing via Argentia, reached Boston on 15 October. She was drydocked the following day, and the damaged propeller was repaired. Albemarle returned thence to Norfolk via the Cape Cod Canal, arriving at Norfolk on 18 October.

Underway on 22 October as part of a task group formed around the escort carrier Croatan and three destroyers, Albemarle sailed for Casablanca. Routed via Bermuda, the group reached its destination on 3 November. After discharging her cargo and disembarking her passengers, the seaplane tender then sailed for the U.S. on 10 November with another convoy, this one larger and formed around the escort carrier Croatan and the light cruiser Philadelphia, escorted by seven destroyers, and containing the USS Matagorda and three transports. Albemarle made a second cruise to Casablanca before the year 1943 was out, underway on 28 November and escorted by the destroyers Barry and Goff, and arriving on 7 December. She sailed on the 13th for Reykjavík, and reached that Icelandic port on the 19th. There she embarked men from VB-128 for transportation back to the U.S., and proceeded out of Reykjavík on 22 December for Norfolk. Battling heavy seas on the return voyage (making only five knots on Christmas Day), Albemarle returned to NOB, Norfolk, on the last day of the year 1943.

=== 1944 ===
Proceeding thence to Bayonne, New Jersey, on 4 January 1944 for upkeep and availability, Albemarle returned to Norfolk on 17 January and prepared for a voyage to San Juan. While outward-bound, however, on 18 January, the seaplane tender fouled a buoy in a thick fog and put about for repairs. Drydocked on 20 January, Albemarle sailed again for her original destination, San Juan, the following day.

Subsequently, touching at Trinidad and Recife, and retracing her path calling at Trinidad and San Juan on the return leg of the passage, Albemarle returned to Norfolk on 23 February for availability. She then steamed to Casablanca in company with the amphibious command ship Catoctin and two destroyers, and, among her passengers on the westward bound trip, were 20 German U-boat sailors, prisoners of war. She arrived back at Norfolk on 1 April. After upkeep at NOB, Norfolk, Albemarle proceeded up to the Naval Supply Depot at Bayonne, where she loaded aviation cargo, between 7 and 13 April. She then sailed, via Norfolk, to Guantánamo Bay, Trinidad, the Brazilian ports of Recife and Bahia, and San Juan, ultimately making arrival back at Norfolk on 27 May for voyage repairs and upkeep. Loading cargo at the end of that period, including 29 dive bombers, Albemarle again shaped a course for North African waters, the seaplane tender making arrival at Casablanca on 20 June. She proceeded thence to Avonmouth, England, where she loaded cargo and embarked passengers for return to the United States. Underway for Boston on 6 July, she reached her destination on the 13th. Albemarle spent the next month undergoing a 30-day availability for repairs and alterations at the Boston Navy Yard. Emerging from the yard on 15 August, the seaplane tender proceeded to Bayonne, to load cargo. Sailing via Norfolk, the ship visited the familiar bases at San Juan, Trinidad, Recife and Guantánamo Bay before returning to NOB, Norfolk, on 29 September. After loading cargo at Bayonne (12–17 October), Albemarle headed south for the supply run to San Juan, Trinidad and Recife. Outward-bound the voyage proved uneventful; however, while loading ammunition and cargo at San Juan for the return leg of the voyage, an electrical fire damaged the ship's main distribution board, putting Albemarle's lighting and ventilation systems out of commission. Underway for Hampton Roads on 22 November, the seaplane tender reached Hampton Roads on the 25th, and moored at NOB, Norfolk, on the 26th to commence an availability.

=== 1945 ===
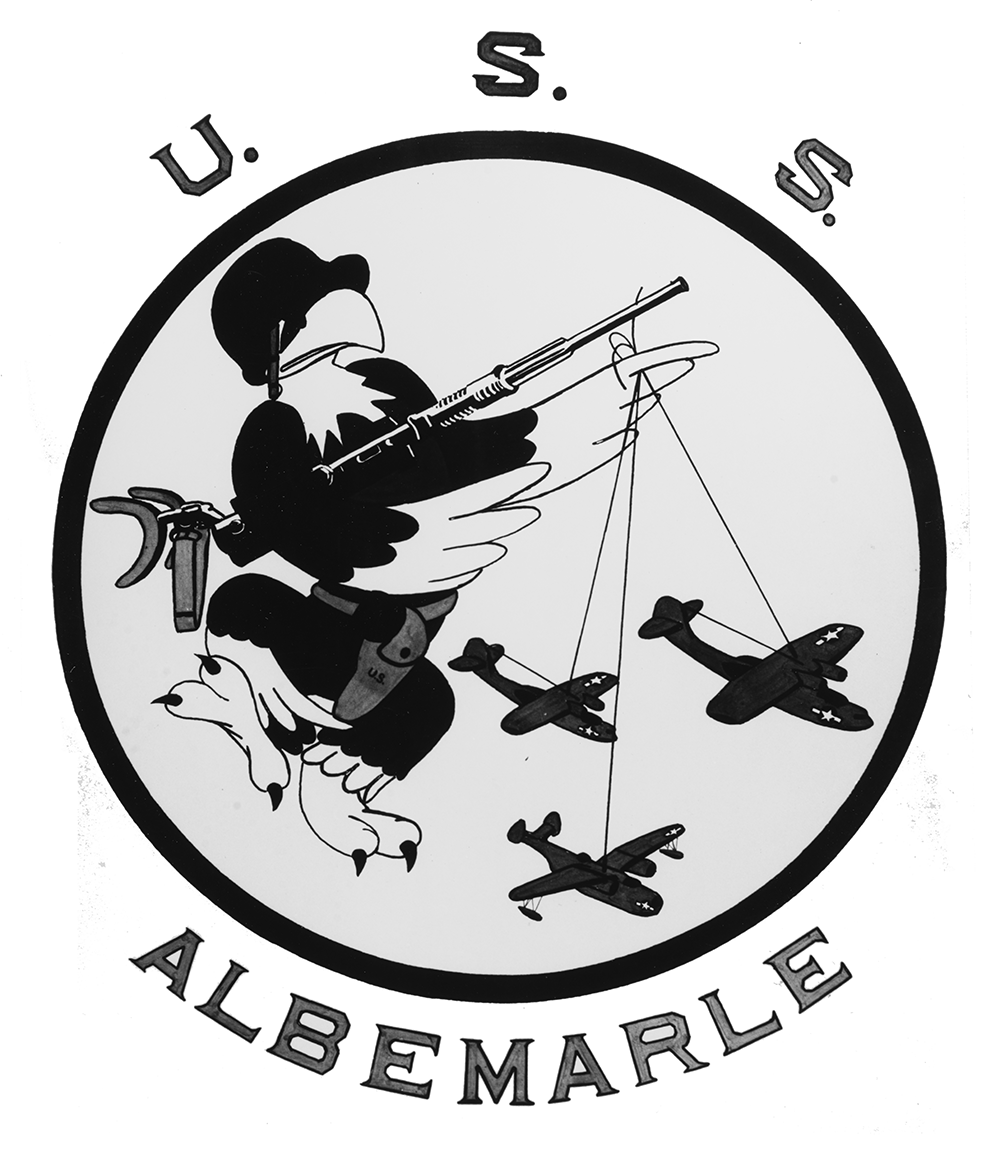
Insignia of USS Albemarle showing a helmeted eagle, armed with a 20mm Oerlikon machine gun and a holstered .45 Pistol, dangling two PBY and one PBM, puppet-fashion, from one wing

Underway for Guantánamo Bay on the last day of 1944, Albemarle dropped anchor there on 4 January 1945. Reporting to Commander, Fleet Air Wing 11, for temporary duty, she tended Patrol Bombing Squadrons (VPB) 201 and 210 at "Gitmo" until 17 January, when the seaplane tender sailed for Coco Solo, arriving at her destination on the 19th. Thence she sailed for Trinidad where she tended VPB-213 from 1–11 February. Shifting back to the Canal Zone soon thereafter, Albemarle commenced tending operations for VPB-214 at Almirante Bay, Panama, on 18 February, and remained engaged in that duty until 22 February. On 25 February, the ship was designated as flagship for Commander, Air Force, Atlantic Fleet, the day after she cleared Limon Bay for the Galápagos group. There, Albemarle tended VPB-74 and VPB-209 from 27 February – 6 March, when the seaplane tender got underway to return to the Canal Zone. She steamed thence to Guantánamo Bay and Norfolk, arriving at the latter place on 17 March for an availability that lasted through mid-May 1945. Albemarle cleared Norfolk on 18 May for New York, laden with cargo, escorted by the destroyers Bernadou and Dallas. Two days later, the seaplane tender sailed for the British Isles in CU-71, a convoy formed around the venerable USAT George Washington. Albemarle's mission was to bring back to the United States those patrol squadrons whose task in the Atlantic had been completed with the end of the War in Europe, and whose presence was required in the still-active Pacific theater. Ultimately, Albemarle reached her destination, Avonmouth, on 30 May, and brought her passengers – men of Fleet Air Wing 7 – back to Norfolk on 14 June. Albemarle made a second voyage to Avonmouth, sailing from Hampton Roads on 4 July 1945 and reaching her destination on 13 July. There she embarked 772 sailors and soldiers, the majority of the latter repatriated prisoners of war. Underway on the 17th, the seaplane tender arrived back at Norfolk on the 26th.

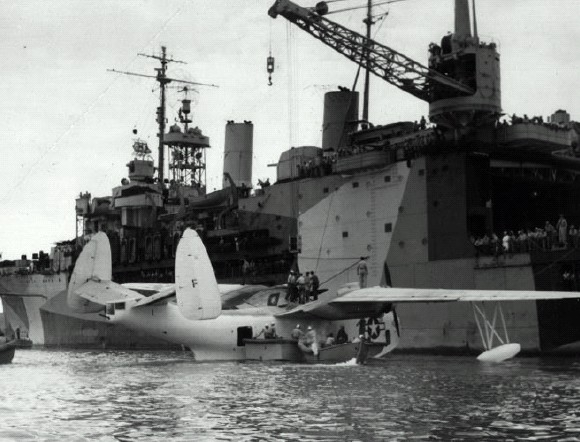
Albemarle at anchor with a PBM Mariner, Guantánamo Bay, January 1945.

Entering the Norfolk Navy Yard on 28 July for repairs and alterations to fit her out for duty in the Pacific, Albemarle was in the midst of this availability when the Pacific War ended in mid-August 1945. The Japanese capitulation suspended the work; and, soon thereafter, the orders to the Pacific to tend seaplanes were cancelled. Shortly thereafter, however, Albemarle underwent alterations of a different kind, to fit her out for different duty. With repairs carried out to the ventilation and berthing arrangements, the seaplane tender departed Norfolk on 25 September with 2,000 Navy replacements embarked, bound for the Canal Zone. She soon reported for duty as a transport under the Naval Transport Service. Albemarle cleared Coco Solo, for Pearl Harbor, but while transiting the Panama Canal suffered damage to her port screw. Reduced to proceeding with a single propeller, the seaplane tender put into San Francisco for repairs. Assigned to the "Magic Carpet" fleet – the ships given the job of returning American veterans home for rotation or discharge – upon completion of her repairs, Albemarle sailed westward, arriving at Pearl Harbor on 1 November before pushing on for New Caledonia, arriving there on 13 November, eventually arriving at NAS Alameda, on 28 November. Following a second round-trip voyage to Samar, in the Philippines, and back, Albemarle underwent a three-month overhaul at the Naval Shipyard, Terminal Island, California in preparation for her participation in Operation Crossroads.

=== 1946 ===
The seaplane tender arrived at the Marshall Islands on 4 May 1946 to provide laboratory and base facilities for the technical staff for the operation. On the date of the first test ("Able"), an air detonation of an atomic device, Albemarle lay 155 mi (249 km; 135 nmi) to the southeast, moored in Kwajalein lagoon. Departing there on 3 July, the ship reached Bikini Atoll the following day, and, except for a rehearsal exercise on 19 July, remained moored at Bikini until she departed the lagoon there on the 25th. She observed the second test ("Baker") on that day, and after spending a brief period at Bikini departed Kwajalein Atoll for Pearl Harbor, reaching her destination on 5 August, her part in "Crossroads" completed. She continued on to the west coast, reaching San Pedro, Los Angeles on 12 August, and remained there until she sailed for Norfolk on 29 October. Arriving at Norfolk via the Panama Canal on 15 November, Albemarle underwent a six-week overhaul at the Norfolk Naval Shipyard.

=== 1947 ===
She remained in the Norfolk area until she sailed on 3 March 1947 with Commander, Training Command, Atlantic, embarked. Stopping briefly at Key West, Florida, from 6–8 March, Albemarle proceeded on down to Guantánamo Bay, reaching her destination on 10 March for a week's operations there. Clearing "Gitmo" on 18 March, the seaplane tender returned to Norfolk on the 21st. Departing the Hampton Roads area on 9 April, Albemarle sailed for Boston, arriving at the naval shipyard there on the 11th. She remained there until 21 April, at which time she sailed for Newport, making arrival the same day. Departing Newport on the 23rd with ComTraComdLant embarked, Albemarle returned to Norfolk on the 24th, remaining in that vicinity, conducting refresher training and routine upkeep, until 30 June, when she sailed for Boston. Spending the 4 July at Boston, Albemarle remained at that port for over a month, shifting to Newport on 5 August and then back to Boston on the 14th, remaining until 2 September, when she sailed for Norfolk. She then conducted one more trip to Newport (22 to 31 October 1947) before coming back to Norfolk on 1 November. She then underwent a restricted availability at the Norfolk Naval Shipyard from 1 December 1947 – 15 January 1948 for "special temporary alterations" in connection with her next operation.

=== 1948 ===
Albemarle sailed from Norfolk on 16 January 1948 for the Canal Zone, and upon completing the transit of the isthmian waterway reported for duty with Commander in Chief, Pacific Fleet, for temporary duty with Joint Task Force "Switchman". Steaming thence to Terminal Island for final fitting out for her next task at hand, and arriving there on 4 February, Albemarle sailed for Pearl Harbor on 1 March, in company with the radar picket destroyer Rogers, proceeding thence to the Marshall Islands, arriving at Eniwetok on 16 March, to take part in Operation Sandstone. Specially altered for the task, Albemarle served as the laboratory ship during "Sandstone" – a three-detonation nuclear atmospheric test series – shots "X-Ray" (15 April), "Yoke" (1 May) and "Zebra" (15 May).

Departing Eniwetok on 21 May, Albemarle arrived at Pearl Harbor on the 27th, en route to Oakland, California, which she reached on 4 June. Sailing for Norfolk on 11 June, she transited the Panama Canal on 20–21 June, and reached her ultimate destination on the 26th. She remained there undergoing overhaul at the Norfolk Naval Shipyard until 23 August, when she sailed for Guantánamo Bay, reaching "Gitmo" on the 27th for a three-day stay. Over the two weeks following her departure from Cuban waters, Albemarle visited Key West, Boston, and Newport before returning to Norfolk on 14 September.

=== 1949 ===
Following an overhaul at Norfolk Naval Shipyard, Albemarle stood out of Hampton Roads on 8 February, and over the ensuing weeks visited a succession of ports and operating areas: Key West; Port-au-Prince, Haiti; Kingston, Jamaica; and Bermuda, interspersing these port visits with training out of Guantánamo Bay. Returning to the Norfolk Naval Base on 19 March, she remained there into the summer, ultimately sailing for Boston on 13 July for a port visit. Subsequently, visiting Newport and New York, Albemarle returned to Norfolk on 27 July, and worked in the local operating areas into September. Further operations late in the summer and early fall of 1949 took the ship to Newport, New York, and the Norfolk local operating areas.

=== 1950–1956 ===
Standing out of Lynnhaven Roads on 2 March 1950, Albemarle subsequently worked out of Vieques, Puerto Rico, and Roosevelt Roads before she visited Martinique (15–17 March 1950), Grenada (17–19 March), Willemstad, Curaçao (20–22 March), and Ciudad Trujillo, Dominican Republic (23–25 March). Stopping briefly at Guantánamo Bay, the ship returned to Norfolk on 31 March and remained there until 11 May, when she got underway for the New York Naval Shipyard, arriving there the following day. While docked at Norfolk she appeared in the opening scene of the 1951 film You're in the Navy Now. Attached to the New York Group, Atlantic Reserve Fleet, the ship was decommissioned on 14 August 1950 and berthed at Brooklyn.

=== 1956–1960 ===
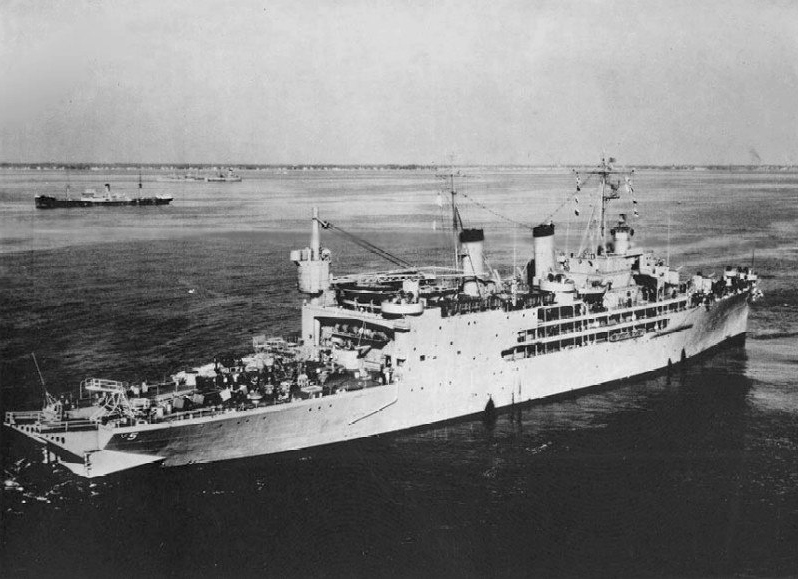
Albemarle, her stem showing the extensive modifications made to enable her to handle the projected Martin P6M "Seamaster" flying boats.

Shifted to the Philadelphia Naval Shipyard in February 1956, Albemarle was earmarked for conversion to tend Martin P6M Seamaster jet flying boats. She was reassigned from the Atlantic Reserve Fleet to the Commandant, 4th Naval District, for conversion, effective 6 February 1956. Equipped with stern ramps and servicing booms to handle the "Seamaster", as well as a semi-sheltered area and a service drydock, the ship emerged from the conversion possessing the capability to serve as a highly mobile seadrome capable of supporting jet seaplanes anywhere. Albemarle was recommissioned at Philadelphia on 21 October 1957, Capt. William A. Dean in command. After fitting out, she sailed for Norfolk on 7 December, and arrived there on the 10th. The ship then sailed for Guantánamo Bay on 3 January 1958, made port there on the 7th, remaining there for ten days and carrying out shakedown training, before dropping down to Montego Bay, Jamaica.

Proceeding thence back to Guantanamo, concluding her shakedown on 21 January, Albemarle steamed thence to San Juan and Trinidad, carrying out tending operations with four squadrons of Martin P5M Marlin flying boats and participating in "Springboard" exercises. Albemarle arrived back at Norfolk on 9 April, remaining there only five days before proceeding back to Philadelphia Naval Shipyard, where she remained under overhaul through mid-July. Returning to Norfolk on 20 July, the ship got underway for operations in the North Atlantic on 14 August to take part in Operation Argus, and ranged as far as the Azores before returning to Norfolk on 16 September. Over the next two months, Albemarle operated between Norfolk and Bermuda; she rounded out the year at Norfolk, arriving there on 19 November and remaining until 2 March 1959.

Albemarle continued to operate out of Norfolk through 1959 and into 1960, although the cancellation of the "Seamaster" program meant that the ship would never service the aircraft for which she had been reconfigured. Her ports and places visited in 1959 encompassed the naval air facility at Patuxent River, Maryland; Pillsbury Sound, in the Virgin Islands; San Juan, and Savannah, Georgia; Halifax and Nova Scotia, Canada; New York City; Yorktown, Virginia, Port-au-Prince; Guantánamo Bay and Bermuda. The ship commenced the year, 1960, operating out of San Juan, then moved in succession to Bermuda, back to San Juan, thence to Pillsbury Sound and Grand Turk Island, in the West Indies, thence to Guantánamo Bay and Pillsbury Sound again; thence to San Juan and Guantanamo, into March. In April 1959, Capt. Vincent Paul de Poix assumed command through November.

Unloading ammunition at the Naval Weapons Station Yorktown, between 12 and 15 July, Albemarle moored at Atlantic Reserve Fleet, Norfolk, commencing preparations for inactivation, from 15 to 18 July, before she proceeded to Philadelphia to unload material. Returning thence to Norfolk on 30 July, she continued inactivation preparations through the summer. Placed out of commission, in reserve, on 21 October 1960, Albemarle was initially berthed with the Norfolk group of the Atlantic Reserve Fleet pending her transfer to the Maritime Administration (MARAD) James River Fleet at Fort Eustis, Virginia. Placed in the custodial care of MARAD, Albemarle was struck from the Naval Vessel Register on 1 September 1962.

== USNS Corpus Christi Bay (T-ARVH-1), 1965–1973 ==
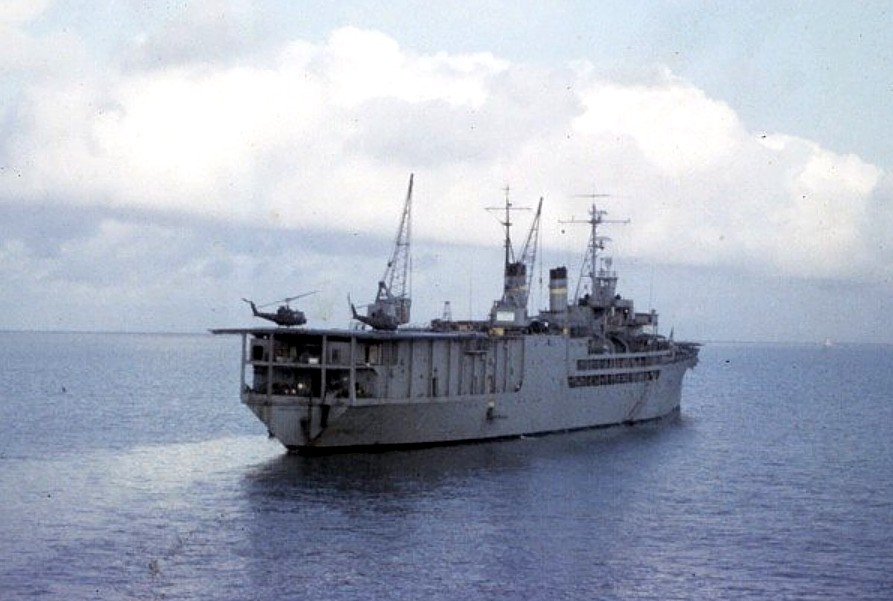
USNS Corpus Christi Bay (T-ARVH-1) at anchor off Vung Tau, South Vietnam, circa 1967–1969. A pair of UH-1 "Huey" helicopters sit atop her aft flight deck.

Sgt. John Francis Sullivan had served with the 107th Quartermaster Company, 126th Infantry, 32nd Infantry Division, in New Guinea during the Battle of Buna–Gona. He was serving with the Air Materiel Command (AMC) at Brookley Field when Operation Ivory Soap was launched in 1944. This project entailed conversion of six Liberty Ships into Aircraft Repair Unit (Floating) for use in the Pacific, supporting aircraft repair and maintenance at advanced bases on islands. Lt. Sullivan was directly involved in the project. He later served aboard the Rebecca Lukens (Brigadier General Alfred J. Lyon) in the Pacific at Guam, Saipan, and Tinian. By November 1962 Col. John F. Sullivan was a widely respected Army aviator. Frank S. Besson, commanding general of AMC, recognizing Sullivan's unique background in converting the Liberty Ships and his Army helicopter experience, assigned him as project officer for [[{Project Flat Top]]. This program involved conversion of USS Albemarle into a floating helicopter repair shop for service off the coast of Vietnam.

On 7 August 1964, MARAD transferred the ship – earmarked for conversion to a floating aeronautical maintenance facility for helicopters – back to the Navy. On 27 March 1965, the ship was reinstated on the Navy Vessel Register and received the new name and classification USNS Corpus Christi Bay (T-ARVH-1), named for Corpus Christi Bay in the southern Texas Coastal Bend; the ship was transferred to the Military Sealift Command (MSC) on 11 January 1966. Converted at the Charleston Naval Shipyard to an Aircraft Repair Ship, Helicopter, Corpus Christi Bay emerged from the yard only faintly resembling her former self. Gone was the prominent seaplane ramp, aft, replaced by a built-up superstructure topped by a helicopter landing pad measuring 50 by 150 ft (15 by 46 m). Previously, damaged helicopters had to be transported back to the U.S. for refit; with the advent of this "new" ship type, repairs could be accomplished near the forward areas, damaged "helos" barged out to the ship and lifted on board by two 20 short tons (18 t) capacity cranes.

Accepted by MSC in January 1966, Corpus Christi Bay's first commander was Captain Harry Anderson, who had a crew of 129 men, a fraction of the ship's original complement, under him. In Vietnam, The ship was run by civilians under the Military Sea Transport Service but the aircraft maintenance facilities aboard the ship were manned by Army Material Command's 1st Transportation Corps Battalion (Aircraft Maintenance Depot [seaborne]). The unit included 308 aircraft technicians and specialists under the command of Lieutenant Colonel Harry O. Davis, USA.

The Floating Aircraft Maintenance Facility allowed the Army to repair and return helicopters to service much more quickly. It provided depot-level maintenance to Army aircraft components including engines, avionics, and armament that previously was only available in the United States. The ship also provided laboratory and calibration support and conducted a limited fabrication program, including some non-aviation items.

The ship operated out of Cam Ranh Bay, South Vietnam, during 1966. During the Vietnam War Corpus Christi Bay participated in several campaigns from 1966 to 1969. Last anchored off Vung Tau, the ship left for the US in late 1972, stopping at Guam, Hawaii, and going through the Panama Canal up to its home base of Corpus Christi, Texas, arriving in December 1972. Ultimately determined by MSC to be "in excess of current and future requirements", Corpus Christi Bay was taken out of service in 1973 and berthed in ready reserve status at Corpus Christi, Texas.

Corpus Christi Bay was struck from the Naval Vessel Register on 31 December 1974. On 17 July 1975, the ship was sold to Brownsville (Texas) Steel and Salvage, Inc. for scrapping.

== Honors and awards ==
=== As USS Albemarle (AV-5) ===
- American Defense Service Medal with "A" device
- American Campaign Medal
- European–African–Middle Eastern Campaign Medal
- Asiatic–Pacific Campaign Medal
- World War II Victory Medal
- National Defense Service Medal

=== As USNS Corpus Christi Bay (T-ARVH-1) ===
- National Defense Service Medal
- Vietnam Service Medal with one battle star for Vietnam War service
- Republic of Vietnam Campaign Medal (Republic of Vietnam)
