= USS Albemarle (1863) =

Screw steamer captured by the Union Navy during the American Civil War

History

United States
- Laid down: date unknown
- Launched: date unknown
- Acquired: 9 May 1863
- In service: circa February 1863
- Out of service: circa July 1865
- Stricken: 1865 (est.)
- Captured: by Union Navy forces; 26 March 1862
- Fate: Sold, 19 October 1865

General characteristics
- Displacement: 200 tons
- Length: 85 ft (26 m)
- Beam: 25 ft 6 in (7.77 m)
- Depth of hold: 7 ft 7 in (2.31 m)
- Propulsion: schooner sail
- Speed: varied
- Complement: not known
- Armament: not known

USS Albemarle was a screw steamer captured by the Union Navy during the American Civil War. She was used by the Union Navy as a ship's tender in support of the Union Navy blockade of Confederate waterways.

== Albemarle and Lion seized by Union Navy forces ==
On the morning of 26 March 1862, sidewheel gunboat Delaware—during an expedition to the Pungo River in Pamlico Sound, North Carolina, in search of Confederate shipping reported to be there—entered Pantego Creek and found two large schooners at its head . . . "which," he reported, "proved to be the Albemarle and Lion owned by Boyle and Richard Reddick, of Suffolk, Virginia."

Two armed boats from the Union warship took possession of the Southern vessels, towed them down stream, and anchored them at the mouth of the creek. Early the next morning, Delaware received on board several families who professed loyalty to the Union and asked for protection. Later that day, the gunboat and its prizes then proceeded to New Bern, North Carolina.

== Assigned as a store ship for Union Navy blockade ships ==
Little information of the prizes' movements during ensuing months seems to have survived, but Albemarle apparently remained in the North Carolina sounds. In any case, she and a schooner named Knockern were reported on 3 February 1863 to be off New Bern serving as storeships for Union forces in the sounds. On 4 May 1863, a report from Rear Admiral Samuel Phillips Lee to Secretary of the Navy Gideon Welles stated that Albemarle was still there performing in the same capacity.

== North Carolina support operations ==
Only five days later, the Union Navy purchased the schooner from the New York City prize court. The fact that the schooner was serving as a storeship in the sounds during the ensuing summer strongly suggests that she never left North Carolina waters but was condemned in absentia. In any case, Albemarle—commanded by Acting Assistant Paymaster Emanuel Mellach until early spring 1865 and then by Acting Assistant Paymaster George R. Watkins—served in North Carolina waters as a storeship and an ordnance hulk through the end of the Civil War.

== Post-war decommissioning and sale ==
Late in July 1865, she was towed to Hampton Roads, Virginia, and sold at public auction in the Norfolk Navy Yard on 19 October 1865 to a Capt. S. I. Bain. No record of her subsequent career seems to have survived.
