= Albemarle (given name) =

Albemarle is a masculine given name which may refer to:

- Albemarle Bertie (MP) (c. 1668–1742), MP for Lincolnshire 1705–1708, Cockermouth 1708–1710 and Boston 1734–1741
- Albemarle Bertie, 9th Earl of Lindsey (1744–1818), Army officer and MP for Stamford 1801–1909
- Sir Albemarle Bertie, 1st Baronet (1755–1824), British admiral
- Albemarle Bowes-Lyon (1940–2023), British banker
- Albemarle Cady (1807–1888), United States Army colonel and brevet brigadier general
- Albemarle Cator (1877–1932), British Army major-general
- Albemarle Cushing, a nickname for U.S. Navy Commander William B. Cushing (1842–1874).
- Albemarle Swepstone (1859–1907), English footballer
