= Albemarle Baptist Church, Scarborough =

Baptist church in Scarborough, North Yorkshire, England

Albemarle Baptist Church
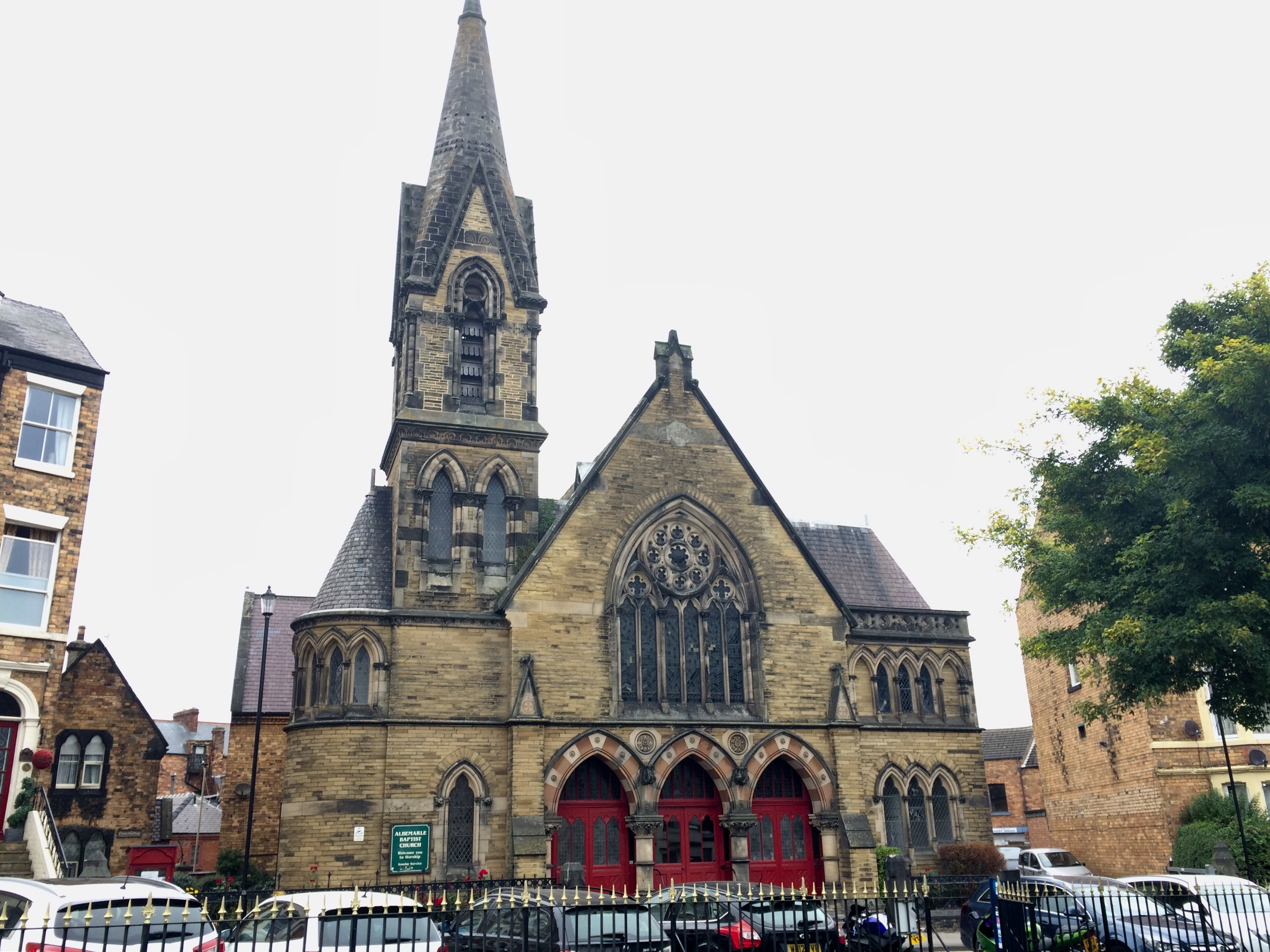
- The church from Albemarle Crescent
- Albemarle Baptist Church
- 54.2824°N 0.4048°W
- Denomination: Baptist
- Website: Church website

History
- Founded: 1863

Architecture
- Functional status: Active
- Heritage designation

Listed Building – Grade II
- Designated: 12 January 1990
- Reference no.: 1272776
- Architect: Henry Francis Lockwood
- Style: Gothic Revival
- Completed: 23 July 1867

Specifications
- Materials: Stone ashlar and white brick

Albemarle Baptist Church is a Grade II listed church located on Albemarle Crescent, central Scarborough, North Yorkshire, England. It was designed in the Gothic Revival style by the Bradford architect Henry Francis Lockwood, and opened in 1867.

== History ==
The founding of Albemarle Church dates to 1863, when forty-one people separated themselves for worship. Under the pastorate and leadership of the Rev. James Lewitt, the church was built and opened on 23 July 1867. Its architect was Henry Francis Lockwood of Bradford, who worked extensively for one of the church's subscribers, Titus Salt, and whose former apprentice Cuthbert Brodrick opened the Grand Hotel in the same year. When in use after consecration, a school building and caretaker's cottage were found to be needed, and were built adjacent by 1868.

The church's organ, of 20 stops and 1,186 pipes, was installed in September 1870 by Booth of Wakefield for a cost of £360 (equivalent to £37,000 in 2025). It was reported that the sound quality was affected by the sound having to emerge through the low arches on two sides due to the organ filling the whole of its square recess.

By the time Lewitt retired from the ministry, the Church had grown in membership from forty-seven to 183. The following ministers were the Revs. W. H. Tetley, W. T. Adey, W. J. Parker and Robert Wood. In 1892, the membership had increased to 343. New institutions were established, the school enlarged and pew rents abolished.

An incident in 1914 in which the church was struck by lightning led to the bursting of a lead gas pipe and the ignition of the gas.

Albemarle Baptist Church, including the attached schoolroom, is recorded in the National Heritage List for England as a Grade II listed building, having been designated on 12 January 1990. Grade II is the lowest of the three grades of listing, and is applied to "buildings that are nationally important and of special interest".

The church and Albemarle Crescent, which includes a large grass area to the church's front, are in the heart of the Scarborough Conservation area. The church has benefited from repairs made under the Scarborough Squares Partnership Grants Scheme which ran 2006-11. This included rebuilding the top five metres of the spire and rebuilding the tracery.

== Description ==
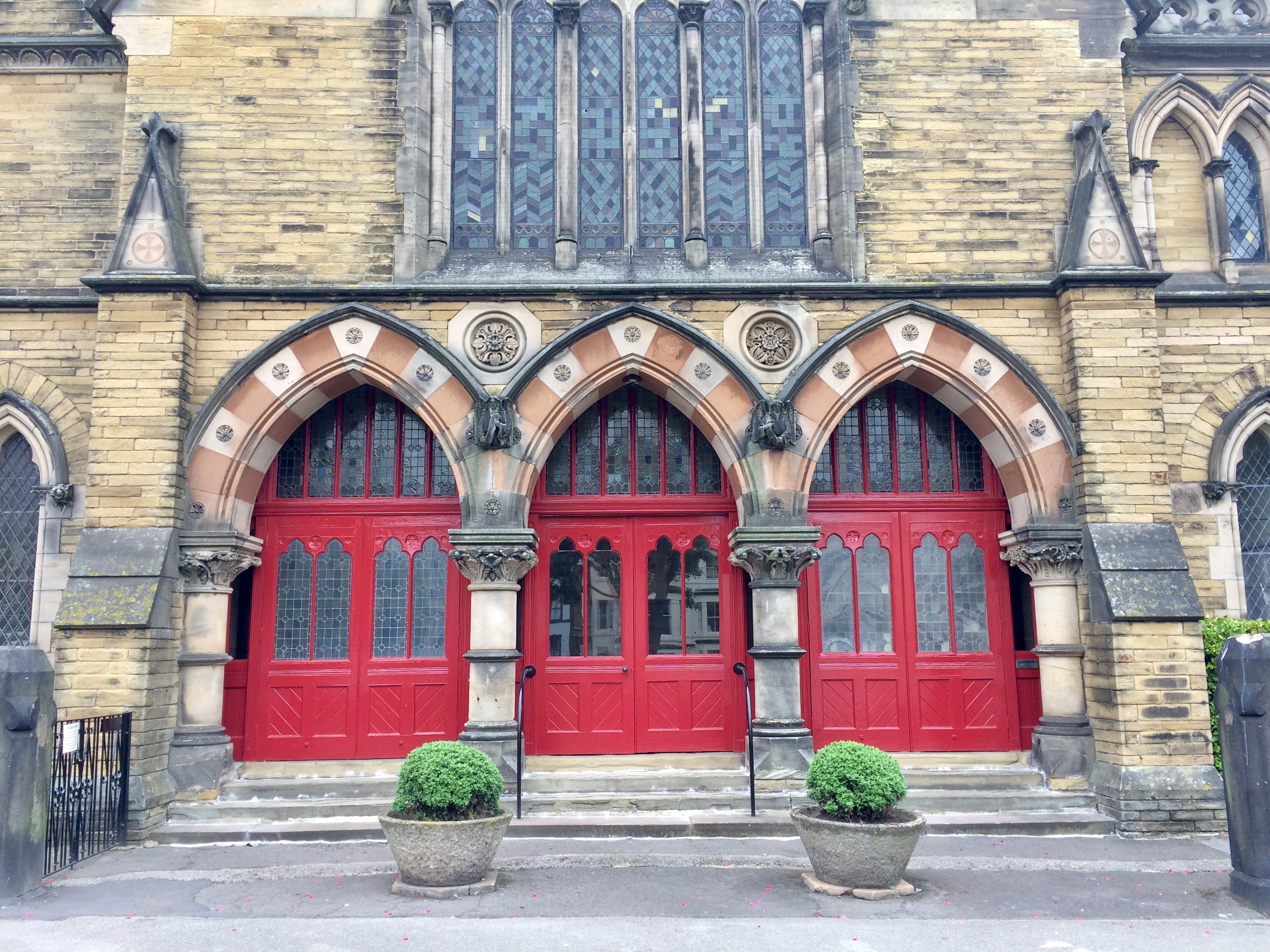
The triple arched main entrance

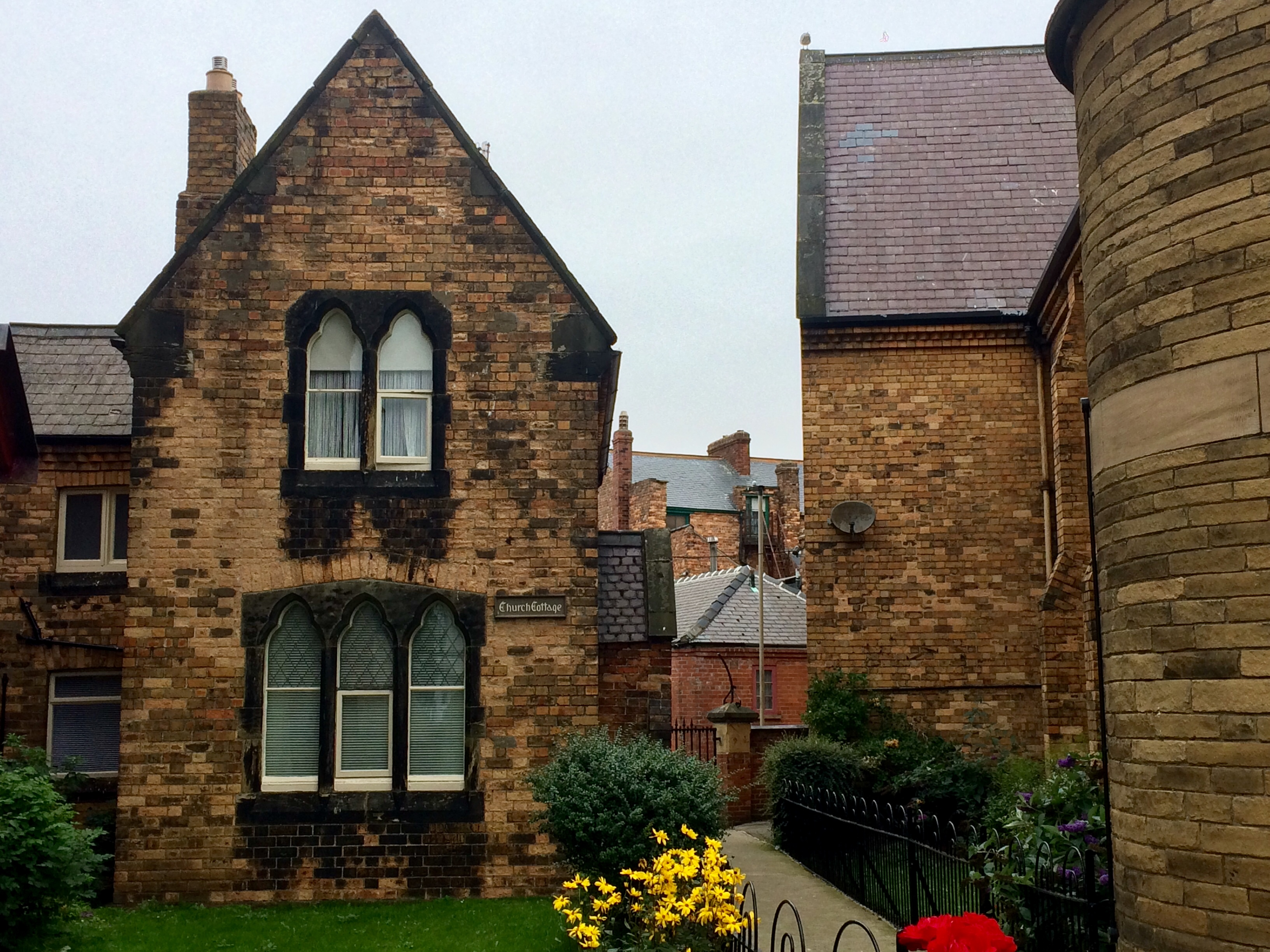
Albemarle Baptist Church Cottage

The building is a classic small church of the Gothic Revival style. Constructed of dressed stone and white brick with ashlar dressings, the street front has a triple arched entrance, with circular piers and responds with foliate capitals, and polychromatic arches. The three sets of double doors have stained glass, and single shallow buttresses flank the entranceway. To its left is a single lancet window, and to its right, three. The side aisles each have four 2-light plate tracery lancets. The transepts have large single 4-light plate tracery windows. The chancel has three 2-light plate tracery windows. To the north east, the attached schoolroom has a canted south front with three 2-light plate tracery windows.

Above is a large six-light pointed arch window with geometric tracery, which has to its right a triple lancet flanked by single blind lancets, topped by a quatrefoil pierced parapet. A small semi-circular apse with a row of 7 upper lancets is to the left of the main window. Above that, the square tower has a pair of lancets, then a moulded string course, a bell stage with a single lancet to each face topped by a tall crocketed gable, and a stone octagonal spire rises several further metres.

Internally, slender iron columns supporting the wooden roof divide the nave and aisles. It is complete with 19th-century wooden pews, pulpit and choir stalls, and a tin-lined total immersion font. The seating can hold 800 people (as of 1890).

Next to the church is a separately listed minister's cottage, also by Lockwood, in white brick and ashlar and in a similar Gothic style including a projecting gabled porch.

== See also ==
- Listed buildings in Scarborough (Castle Ward)
