= Albemarle Training School =

Coordinates: 38.084442°N 78.488216°W

Albemarle Training School was a segregated school for African American students in Albemarle County, Virginia. It was located north of Charlottesville near the currently called Ivy Creek Reservoir. It was built on the site of the Union Ridge Graded School, founded 1885, after the original building burned down in 1893. The school served all grades and is known to be the first 'four-year high school' for African American students in Albemarle County. In 1951, its students were transferred to the new Burley High School in Charlottesville, and the facility became an elementary school until its closing in 1959.

== Curriculum and student body ==
The school's curriculum changed significantly over time, beginning with practical training in trades and eventually shifting to a more academically oriented high-school curriculum. In 1918, the school planned to open a broom factory in Charlottesville, operating as a satellite program of the school. In 1941, a course in woodworking, taught by W. W. Coles, was added to the curriculum as part of the county's effort to add national defense training courses to the school district.

The school's student body shifted with the demographics of Albemarle County. During the era in which the school operated, the African American population decreased, but a higher percentage of remaining African American children entered high school classrooms. In 1941, a school in Oak Union closed and its prospective students enrolled at the Albemarle Training School.

== Administration ==
The school was led by African American principals and teachers, as was generally the case in segregated schools in the region. The school's first principal was Jesse Scott Sammons (1853-1901). A descendant of the Hemings family of Monticello, he grew up in the free Black community of Union Ridge and had been the first teacher at the one-room Ivy Creek school, and the first principal of the Union Ridge Graded School. John G. Shelton served as Principal in the 1910s; he was also editor of the Charlottesville Messenger, the city's Black newspaper at the time. Mary Carr Greer served as the school's principal from 1931 to 1949, after teaching Domestic Science there for fifteen years. She worked to develop an accredited 4-year curriculum similar to that in white high schools of the period.
