= Albemarle High School =

Albemarle High School may refer to one of the following schools:

- Albemarle High School (North Carolina)
- Albemarle High School (Virginia)
