= HMS Albemarle =

Five ships of the Royal Navy have been named HMS Albemarle after George Monck, 1st Duke of Albemarle (sometimes the spelling Albermarle is seen).

- HMS Albemarle (1664) was a ship in service in 1664. Nothing more is known.
- HMS Albemarle (1667) was a 6-gun fireship purchased and expended in 1667.
- HMS Albemarle (1680) was a 90-gun second-rate ship of the line launched in 1680, renamed Union in 1709, rebuilt in 1726 and broken up in 1749.
- HMS Albemarle (1779) was a 28-gun sixth-rate, previously the French ship Menagere. She was captured in 1779 and was sold in 1784.
- HMS Albemarle (1901) was a Duncan-class battleship launched in 1901. She was broken up in 1919.
