= Stumbling Man =

Outdoor sculpture by David K. Rubins

- Artist: David K. Rubins
- Year: 1969
- Type: Bronze
- Dimensions: 83 cm × 97 cm × 160 cm (32.5 in × 38 in × 62 in)
- Location: Indianapolis Museum of Art; Indianapolis, Indiana; 39°49′36″N 86°11′0.44″W
- Owner: Indianapolis Museum of Art

Stumbling Man is an outdoor sculpture by American artist David K. Rubins (1902–1985) located on the grounds of the Indianapolis Museum of Art (IMA), which is near downtown Indianapolis, Indiana. The sculpture is cast bronze and is in the shape of a man crouched upon the ground.

== Description ==
The sculpture is a life-size, cast bronze figure of a man on his hands and knees. The man's head is bent toward the ground, and his posture is tensed as if he is trying not to collapse further. Both hands and both feet are in contact with the horizontal bronze base, which is approximately two inches thick; his proper left knee is also connected to this base. His proper right leg is in a position of moving slightly forward. The surface of the bronze is highly textured and carries a brown patina, with the texture allowing some areas of brighter bronze to show through.

A rectilinear piece of limestone, about 50” x 65” x 12”, serves as a pedestal for the sculpture.

== Historical information ==
Rubins created the sculpture for a state-sponsored art competition; his purpose was to memorialize the lives of Indiana coal miners.

=== Acquisition ===
The sculpture was given to the IMA by David K. Rubins. A plaster version of the statue was received by the IMA in 1972, and the bronze cast was made in 1976. It was dedicated on April 23, 1981, in a special ceremony honoring the artist on the IMA grounds. Rubins delivered an address at the ceremony of approximately 100 guests, which included colleagues, collectors, former students, and friends of the artist and IMA staff.

== Artist ==
David Kresz Rubins was born in Minneapolis in 1902. As a young man, he apprenticed with James Earle Fraser before moving on to study at Dartmouth College and the Beaux-Arts Institute of Design in New York. He then traveled to Europe to study in Paris, where he was awarded the Paris Prize in Sculpture. He was a fellow of the American Academy in Rome from 1928 to 1931. He joined the faculty of the Herron School of Art in Indianapolis in 1935. While there, he taught drawing, anatomy, ceramics, and sculpture. He also authored a textbook, The Human Figure: An Anatomy for Artists, in 1953.

Rubins’ work includes the statue of Young Abraham Lincoln outside the Indiana Statehouse, a number of plaques at Riley Hospital, and the sculpture of Henry F. Schricker inside the Statehouse.

Rubins retired from teaching in 1970, three years after Herron became a part of Indiana University. He was named Professor Emeritus in 1981. He died in 1985 at the age of 82.

== Condition ==
The bronze sculpture is monitored, cleaned, and treated regularly by the IMA art conservation staff. The surface of the bronze is protected from deterioration and corrosion by the yearly application of a fresh coat of hard wax. This sculpture was surveyed in July 1993 as part of the Smithsonian American Art Museum's Inventories of American Painting and Sculpture database, and it was considered to be well maintained.

== See also ==
- List of Indianapolis Museum of Art artworks
- Save Outdoor Sculpture!
