= Stea =

Stea is a surname. Notable people with the surname include:

- Cesare Stea (1893–1960), American sculptor
- Kevin Stea (born 1969), American dancer, choreographer, actor, singer, director, and model
