= Robert Edward Weaver =

U.S. regionalist artist and illustrator (1913–1991)

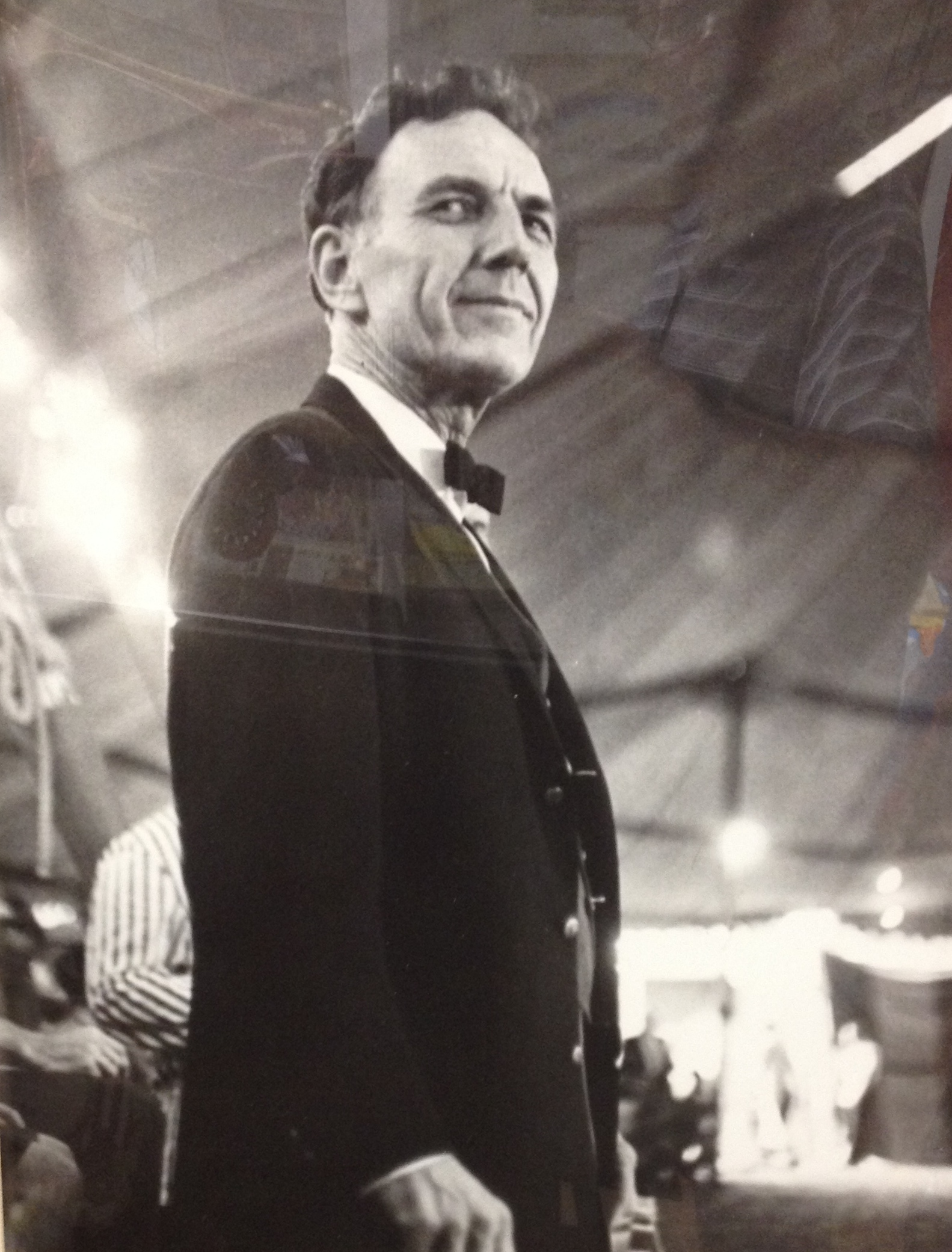
- Born: November 15, 1913; Peru, Indiana
- Died: July 18, 1991 (aged 77); New Bern, North Carolina
- Occupations: Painter, Muralist, Sculptor, Professor
- Spouse: Helen Betty Spiegel-Weaver
- Website: www.robert-edward-weaver.com

Robert Edward Weaver (November 15, 1913 – July 18, 1991) was an American regionalist artist, and illustrator. He was professor emeritus of art at the Herron School of Art and Design in Indianapolis, Indiana. Weaver earned a BFA from the Herron School in 1938. Weaver grew up in Peru, Indiana, winter home of the American Circus Corporation, a conglomerate of circuses that traveled the country at the later part of the 19th and early 20th centuries. The circus performers that frequented his father's general store influenced his creative senses.

== Early career and recognition ==
Weaver won the John Armstrong Chaloner Paris Prize in 1937. This was the largest single art prize at that time for painters in the United States, consisting of a $6,000 stipend for study overseas for 3 years, and a New York studio space. Among the jury members who awarded Weaver the first prize were sculptor Mahonri Young and the painter Gifford Beal. After a screening by the Chaloner committee, Weaver along with 15 other artists were invited to submit fully realized works. For Weaver, that work was Back Door (aka Next Up). The initial rounds of the competition ended in a tie between Weaver and another artist name Bernie Quick for the first prize. The two finalists were challenged by the committee to a paint-off over an allotted amount of time. Weaver presented two paintings to the final committee. The Repensky Riders and A Night at the Circus (aka Riding Clowns) see below. His painting The Repensky Riders (aka Manhattan Matinee) won the competition for Weaver who was only 24 years of age at the time. Weaver studied painting with Henrik M. Mayer, and sculpture with David K. Rubins at Herron.

Weaver's victory in the Chaloner competition in Time Magazine opening many doors for the artist in the New York art world of the time. Just prior to entering the Chaloner competition, Weaver had received two medals for Mural Design from the Beaux-Arts Institute of Design from 1935 to 1936. His entry was entitled, A Mural for a Dining Room in a Country House. Weaver went on to win the Third Hallgarten Prize at the National Academy of Design in 1938.

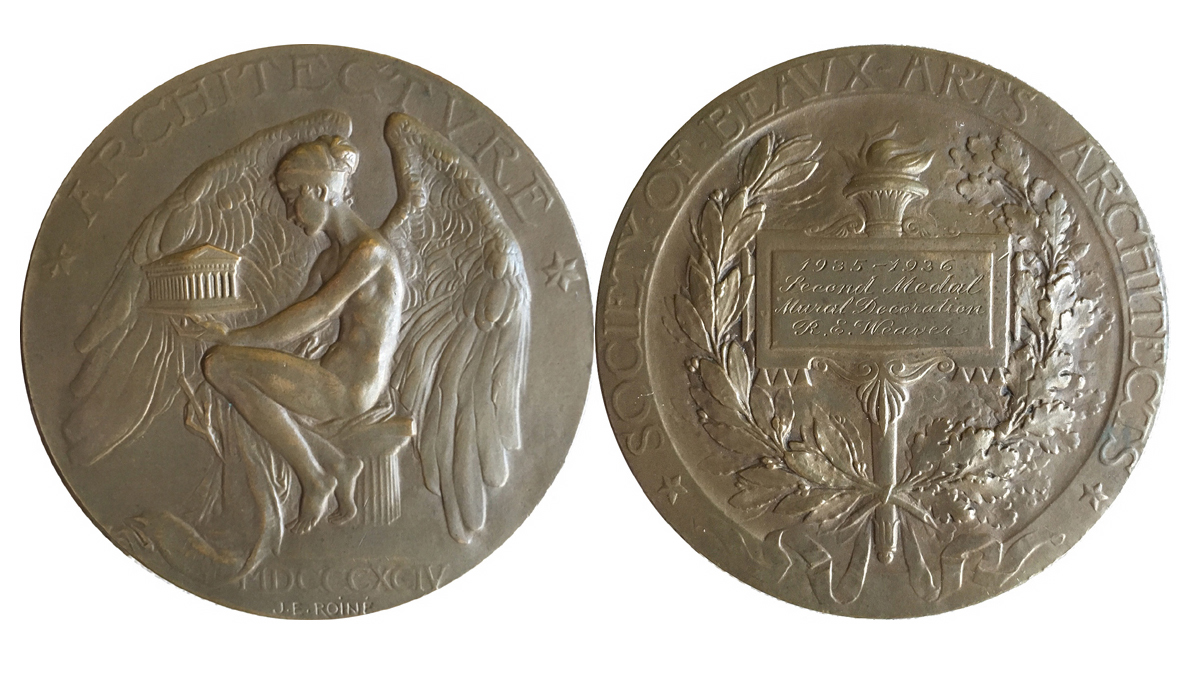
Image of the Society of Beaux Arts Architects won by Robert Edward Weaver for his design of a mural for a country home in 1935-1936.

The Hallgarten prize was, “for a picture in oil colors painted in the United States by an American citizen under thirty-five years of age.” The third prize winning entry was entitled Wagon 97. The painting went on to many exhibitions across the nation through the auspices of the American Federation of Arts. On April 21, 1938 Weaver received a letter from the Grand Central Art Galleries of New York informing him that their jury had approved his work, and that he was elected a life member of the Galleries. He was one of 3 out of over 400 applicants to be accepted that year.

Wagon 97 c. 1938, (collection of the Indiana State Museum)

Subsequent works went on to be exhibited at the Art Institute of Chicago, The Minneapolis Institute of Art, New York State Museum, Albany, NY, and The Columbus Gallery of Fine Arts, Columbus, Ohio. On January 12, 1939 the Grand Central Galleries informed Weaver that his work Rehearsal had been sent to the Pennsylvania Academy Jury. In the meantime, Rehearsal was included in the Academy's Founder's Show and then it was slated to go to The 16th Biennial Exhibition of Contemporary American Oil Paintings at the Corcoran Gallery of Art from March 26 to May 7, 1939. Another important work, Circus Girl In Her Dressing Tent was shipped to the Pennsylvania Academy for inclusion in their exhibition beginning on January 29, 1939.

Weaver returned home to Indiana in April 1938 to attend his graduation ceremonies at the Herron Art Institute. Weaver did not return to New York until he sailed for England in the late spring of 1939 following the death of his father. During his time back in Peru, he painted his large work Those Riding Hannefords which was invited to be exhibited at the 1939 Golden Gate International Exposition. Weaver embarked aboard the SS Champlain from New York to England on May 25, 1939 to fulfil his Chaloner overseas obligations. Weaver travelled and studied in some of the major centers of Europe, including London, Amsterdam, and Paris. He met up with 2 artist friends Harry Davis, and George Prout from the Herron school who were also studying in Europe at the time. The three friends road bicycles to Le Havre, France to exit the country before the German occupation began. Upon his return to the United States, Weaver contacted the Chaloner Foundation to obtain permission to finish his overseas study in Mexico. Weaver and members of his family, including his mother, departed for Mexico on March 18, 1940. There, Weaver visited many historic sites where he was exposed to the work of muralists such as Diego Rivera, and José Clemente Orozco whose style of work would later inform his mural compositions. Weaver would not return to New York to do more studio work until September 1941.

== War years 1943–1946 ==
Weaver entered the Naval Training School at Ohio State University on April 1, 1943, and upon successful completion was commissioned an Ensign in the United States Naval Reserve. Ensign Weaver was first assigned duty at NOB Norfolk, Virginia on June 9, 1943. By August 1943, Weaver had been transferred for duty at the Naval Air Station Alameda, California. There, Weaver, now Lieutenant (j.g.), was commissioned by the station's Commanding Officer to paint a set of 4 murals for dining halls of the Bachelor Officers Quarters. The murals were the subject of great interest during the station's celebration of its 50th year in 1984. The murals depicted the development of the California territory. 1. Arrival of the Spanish missionaries. 2. Spanish development of California. 3. The gold rush. 4. Modern day California depicting agricultural development and arrival of the aviation industries, and 5. California's wine industry. The murals took 3 months to execute, and were in the style of the 1930s WPA mural work.

Weaver requested to be shipped out overseas into forward positions. He requested to be assigned to Air Rescue Squadron Three (VH-3), which was seeing action near Okinawa. In November 1944 Weaver was assigned to the 12th Naval District, Patrol Bombing Squadron Nineteen, Okinawa. Weaver saw action during the heat of the Volcano and Ryukyu Islands campaign. During his duty with the squadron, Weaver designed the unit's "Squadron Insignia." His VH-3 Squadron rescued numerous downed allied and enemy pilots during the campaign. Flying as a Martin PBM Mariner crew-member, Weaver's VH-3 squadron distinguished itself and earned the Navy Unit Commendation for service from 29 March to 30 June 1945. Throughout the trial overseas Weaver continued to draw, creating numerous action depictions to chronicle his squadron's work. A fine example of this was his work Survivors, a drawing on board of two recovered pilots with blankets over their heads, giving an impression of monks at prayer. The riveted construction of the aircraft's interior recalls the interior of a buttressed cathedral. Weaver separated from the service on 2 February 1946 at the rank of Lieutenant.

== Post-war years 1946–1951 ==
Weaver was in Hawaii awaiting reassignment when WWII ended on August 14, 1945. He subsequently undertook a major commission sponsored by Indianapolis Methodist Hospital to paint a large mural in the hospital's children's ward. An Indianapolis News article by author Filomena Gould stated, "I like the story behind the man who is painting murals in the children's ward at Methodist Hospital, making its solarium—the gift of Thomas Taggart—a place of enchantment for the shut-in youngsters. Offhand, it seems to me that what Fragonard was to Versailles, what Van Dyck was to the Stuarts, what Bellows was to the prize ring, and Benton to the barn lot, this Hoosier-bred painter is to the circus."

The Indianapolis News of Thursday, September 5, 1946 announced that Weaver would be added to the Herron Art School faculty for the coming season. A work entitled Portrait of A Woman was included in the Carnegie Institute's exhibition Painting in the United States, 1946. The work was exhibited hanging in line with works by Tully Filmus, Paul Cadmus, Leopold Seyffert, and Reginald Marsh. Grand Central Galleries contacted Weaver on June 28, 1946 to inform him that they had sold "a circus picture," Summer Afternoon to International Business Machines. Another work sold that year. The award-winning Wagon 97 sold to the industrialist Mr. Paul Kollsman. The painting was lost for many years but appeared in an episode of the TV show "Columbo"/Identity Crisis where it can be seen in several shots hanging on the wall in the same frame that was on it until it resurfaced in a December, 1997 sale at Sotheby's Auction house. The painting was purchased by the Spanierman Galleries, New York, NY, and featured in the gallery's sale catalogue entitled The Spirit of America: American Art from 1829-1970. Wagon 97 was featured on the inside cover of the catalogue. Although Weaver had abandoned his studio in New York, he continued to produce work which included more common subjects depicting life in Indiana. The Butchering was one of these works. Accepted by the National Academy of Design for its 123rd Annual Exhibition in 1949, The Butchering was also shown at the 24th Annual Hoosier Salon, Indianapolis, Indiana, and L. S. Ayres & Company, "75th Anniversary Art Exhibition," November 1947 (Second Prize, $750, Edward Hopper, juror). In 1950 Weaver was selected to execute 4 murals for the new remodeled offices of the president of Eli Lilly & Company, Mr. J. K. Lilly. With the Lilly murals completed, Weaver took advantage of the fresco class being offered at the Skowhegan School of Painting and Sculpture in Skowhegan, Maine. The school was in its 6th year in 1951 under the direction of Henry Varnum Poor (designer). The faculty consisted of six instructors and would be augmented by visiting artists among whom could be counted Yasuo Kuniyoshi.

== New horizons 1952–1960 ==
The 1950s were referred to by Weaver as has his "Gothic period." The subject matter of his work become more sterile, and several paintings of religious content were produced. Two works in particular are representative of this new period. He Went Up Into the Mountain, and Daniel In the Lions Den (aka Daniel) are prime examples of Weaver's work from this period.

His circus themed works also were executed in this new angular style. Weaver's work Unus from 1952 is an example of this as well as his 1956 work Circus Poster now in the collection of the Indianapolis Museum of Art. The works are also characterized by the use of more earth tones in a manner of Pieter Bruegel the Elder. Weaver's use of more earth tones in his coloring continued through much of the 1970s.

Weaver married his partner for life Helen Betty Spiegel of Cincinnati on August 29, 1952. Betty became Weaver's greatest critic and champion. Weaver became more firmly planted in Indiana, taking on more teaching responsibilities at the Herron School. Commissions for mural work in his home state continued, with Weaver's execution of 10 murals for the Indiana Soldier's and Sailor's and Children's Home located in Knightstown Indiana. Weaver continued his position teaching mural design at Herron. In December, 1954 sketches of murals to be painted by his Herron students were presented to Dr. Fabien Sevitsky, music director of the Indianapolis Symphony Orchestra. Sevitsky chose three scenes that were executed by a group of third year students of Beaux-Arts design under the supervision of Weaver. Throughout the decade Weaver continued to exhibit in faculty exhibitions at Herron, and at the Hoosier Salon.

One of the interests in Weaver's life from an early age was auto racing. The earliest example of works dealing with this subject matter was Crash, probably painted in 1930. He became acquainted with Tony Hulman of the Indianapolis Motor Speedway, and would often take his Herron students to the speedway to sketch images of cars and drivers. Weaver would produce annual artworks for Hulman for display in his home, office, and the Speedway Museum. This friendship would eventually culminate in an annual poster design competition at the Herron School judged by Mr. Hulman who presented the winners with cash prizes. This collaboration was documented in a program produced in November, 1996 for WFYI Public Television for Indiana entitled Roar of the Grease/Paint. The program spotlighted Weaver and was hosted by Allegra East.

Commercial art became a source of additional income. His work appeared in national magazines, including Holiday (magazine), The Saturday Evening Post (revival), Good Housekeeping, Child Life, Children's Playmate, and The Brownie Reader. Weaver began to design everything from auto accessories, artist's tables of his own invention (The Octopus), and designs for stationary for the Osborn Midwest Corporation, Marion, Indiana. Weaver continued however to produce easel work, although he was less prolific. The Indianapolis Museum of Art purchased his work Circus Poster c. 1956 in 1961 for their permanent collection with funds from the Daniel P. Erwin Fund.

== Circus resurrected 1960–1980 ==
It had long been a dream of Weaver's to bring the circus back to Peru, or at least celebrate the history of the circus in Peru. A group of close friends and civic minded Peru citizens joined Weaver to establish the Circus City Festival, Inc. (CCFI), an organization in which he served as president. The CCFI was instrumental in the foundation and promotion of the Peru Amateur Circus and the Circus City Festival, held each July in Peru to rekindle the area's interest in its rich Circus Heritage. Along with this he established Operation Facelift to encourage the merchants to adopt the circus theme for their storefronts and decor. To finance this project the entire community rose to the occasion and produced A Night With Cole Porter (a native Peruvian). For his many civic efforts he was named Man of the Year by the Peru Daily Tribune and Outstanding Citizen by the Peru Chamber of Commerce.

In 1969 Indiana University and Purdue University merged their Indianapolis extensions to become one entity, Indiana University – Purdue University Indianapolis. The John Herron School of Art was part of that merger, because of its association with Indiana University. Weaver was given the title of Assistant Professor of Art, with a promotion to full Professor shortly thereafter. At Herron, Weaver, like his teachers when he was a student there, urged his students to enter competitions. Weaver was now teaching Drawing and Illustration at Herron. Many of his students had success entering the Society of Illustrators yearly competitions. Several won awards at the Society beginning in 1965. Weaver himself won with his own work Sanctuary in 1974. Weaver presented Sanctuary to the Herron School of Art as a way of giving back to the institution for all it had done for him. Additional awards came to Weaver from the Society of Illustrators, the Strobridge Special Service Award, and the Distinguished Service Award from the Indiana State Museum.

His work Lost Parade was the seminal work in a new style in his paintings. Weaver worked less and less in oil paints, preferring acrylic because of its quick drying nature. His later work also demonstrated his forte′ for drawing. Although his easel time was sparse during this period, there was never a time that Weaver was not sketching in his sketch pad. His main direction now was to chronicle the circus in his artwork like never before. His works became extremely accurate in their portraiture of people and objects associated with the history of the American circus. Like Lost Parade, many of his subjects illustrated the demise of the greatest form of entertainment that America known. He researched the various wagons and riggings that were utilized, and worked them into his compositions. Weaver also produced very large formatted portraits of famous performers. Harkening back to Wagon 97, Weaver reiterated his affinity for the circus lot as a place of great activity, a city rising from a grassy field inhabited by performers from many nations. His works looked at extraordinary performers doing everyday things; rehearsing, bathing, resting, and waiting in anticipation of their performance.

Weaver's work was the subject of a one-man exhibition at the Indiana State Museum entitled Circus Heritage In Indiana. Weaver had decided to apply for a sabbatical from Herron to work on the exhibition which produced new work to illustrating the roots of circuses in Indiana. The exhibit ran from September 25, 1977 through January 15, 1978. Because of the tremendous reception and attendance the exhibition was held over until February 15, 1978.

== Final act 1980–1991 ==
In 1981 an exhibition entitled Center Ring the Artist: Two Centuries of Circus Art was mounted by the Milwaukee Art Museum. The exhibition was sponsored by the Milwaukee Sentinel newspaper. Weaver was invited to submit a work. His work Butterfly Ladies was shown with works by Chagall, Picasso, Calder, Kuhn, Hogarth, and in a flash back to the Chaloner competition in 1937, jury member Gifford Beal. The exhibition traveled to the Columbus (Ohio) Museum of Art, The New York State Museum, Albany, NY, and the Corcoran Gallery, Washington, DC. Butterfly Ladies was purchased by the Indiana State Museum.

Weaver retired as Professor Emeritus of Art from the Herron School in 1982. Weaver would move to New Bern, North Carolina to open a restaurant with his family. There, he continued to produce easel work and experiment with abstract art. When he was asked why he was doing abstract art, he stated that it was something he needed to do to grow as an artist. He produced several works in this style. He also continued work on a fantasy picture book that was never published. Weaver intended to entitle it Huminals. The book explored what would creatures look like that were part human, animal, insect, or plant. His later works dealt with subjects that asked the question, what if? They were meant to be thought provoking. There had always been this side to Weaver's personality, and as an artist Weaver wanted to provoke the viewer of his work to look closer, and to ask questions. Towards the end of his life Weaver never strayed too far from his love for the circus as a subject. In some works he incorporated some of his provocative nature with a circus subject to again eulogize its demise as an entertainment form. Weaver continued to sketch until the last week of his life when he finally put pencil and pad aside in July 1991.

== Opus Posthumous, 1991-present ==
With the passing of Weaver, much of his known work was left to be organized by his heirs. A private showing and sale of several of his works was mounted at Whitehall at the Villa antiques in Chapel Hill, NC. More significantly was an in-depth exhibition and sale by Eckert Fine Art of Indianapolis, IN. One Man's World was the first exhibition to look at Weaver's life's work. The exhibition and sale took place in the fall of 1995 from November 4, through November 18; moving then to the Eckert gallery in Naples, FL. A feature article on Weaver appeared in the Indianapolis Star newspaper on Tuesday, October 31, 1995. During this same period, a full-length video documentary on Weaver's work with Indianapolis 500 president Tony Hulman aired on WFYI-TV as part of the series Across Indiana. Several more posthumous exhibitions would take place. In July 2003, The Miami County Indiana Historical Society would join with the International Circus Hall of Fame, Peru Circus City Festival, and the Peru Community Schools Art Museum to present a retrospective exhibition of Weaver's work. These organizations would join again in May, 2007 to mount another exhibition at the Peru Community Schools Art Museum. Many of the works exhibited in these exhibitions came from the private collection of Weaver's most notable patron Fred Senger. Senger was a long time business man in Miami county that enjoyed Weaver's work, amassing a large collection over 3 decades.

On May 14 and 15, 2010 the Indianapolis Symphony Orchestra premiered a work by their principal trombonist and Pulitzer Prize nominated composer James A. Beckel Jr. Beckel's work In the Mind's Eye, a work for orchestra and four French horns used art as inspiration for its three movements. Weaver's work Daniel (aka Daniel In the Lion's Den) served as the inspiration for the second movement of the piece. In the Mind's Eye enjoyed its international debut in Norway in the spring of 2013, when it was performed by the Trondheim Symphony Orchestra under conductor Krzysztof Urbanski. During the performance of the Beckel's piece, images of the three works that inspired Beckel's composition were projected to a large screen above the orchestra to enhance the listener's experience by viewing the works of art at the same time.

From 2010 to 2011, Weaver's work enjoyed recognition as part of exhibition by the Indiana State Museum (ISM) Indiana Realities: Regional Paintings 1930-1945 curated at the ISM by Rachel Berenson Perry. The exhibition was drawn from the private collection of Robert L. and Ellen E. Hann. The exhibition ran from March 6, 2011 to September 11, 2011. Two works by Weaver were included in the exhibition. They were Back Door (aka Next Up) and Riding Clowns (aka A Night at the Circus). Next Up served as the exhibition's frontispiece at the entrance to the exhibition. An American Art Review (March/April 2011 issue) magazine article by Rachel Berenson Perry reviewed the ISM exhibition. The exhibition showcased the work of some of the deans of Indiana's regionalist artists that made great strides on the international competition scene over a 15-year period. Many, such as Weaver, had connections to the Herron School of Art and Design. Under the guidance of then school Dean Donald Magnus Mattison, Herron students like Weaver put Indiana art on the national map as a force of creative excellence. Since both Next Up and Riding Clowns were involved in Weaver's Challoner Prize victory so many years prior, the life of Robert Edward Weaver the artist had truly come full circle.

Beginning on March 20, 2016 and continuing until October 2, 2016, "Those Riding Hannefords" by Robert Edward Weaver was featured in the exhibition "200 Years of Indiana Art: A Cultural Legacy" at the Indiana State Museum, in Indianapolis, Indiana.

== Prizes ==
- 1935 — National Academy of Design, Mural Competition — Second Prize
- 1935–1936 — Society of Beaux-Arts Architects — Second medal, Mural Decoration
- 1937 — John Armstrong Chaloner Prize — The Repensky Riders, First Prize
- 1938 — National Academy of Design — Wagon 97, Third Hallgarten Prize
- 1946 — Indiana State Fair — The Ironer, Principal Prize
- 1947 — L.S. Ayres Art Exhibition — The Butchering, Second Prize
- 1948 — 16th Annual Indiana Artists Club — Junk Boys, Joseph J. Daniels Award
- 1950 — 26th Annual Hoosier Salon — Uptown, Katherine Keene Langdon Award for Outstanding Character/Figure Study
- 1952 — Indiana State Fair — (Work unknown), Honorable Mention Oil Painting Figure or Composition
- 1955 — Indiana State Fair — (Work unknown), 4th Premium/Drawing
- 1966 — Indiana State Fair — Lost Parade, Best of Show
- 1966 — Indiana State Fair — (Work unknown), 1st Prize for Drawing
- 1967 — 35th Indiana Artists Club — Dwelling, Bates Brothers Award
- 1967 — Indianapolis 500 Exhibition — Gemini, 2nd Most Meritorious Work, any medium
- 1969 — 37th Indiana Artists Club — Probe, K.A. Chittick Award
- 1970 — 38th Indiana Artists Club — "Otto", Mrs. Donald M. Mattison Award
- 1971 — 39th Indiana Artists Club — My Sister Nio, Mrs. Donald M. Mattison Award
- 1972 — Indianapolis 500 Exhibition — Resin Back, Schuster Block Award
- 1972 — 40th Indiana Artists Club — Sanctuary, Mrs. Herman C. Krannert Award
- 1973 — 49th Hoosier Salon — Stars and Stripes Forever, Jury Prize of Distinction
- 1973 — Indiana State Fair — 1st Prize Drawing & Pastels (work unknown at this time)
- 1974 — 50th Hoosier Salon — Great Wall, Jury Prize of Distinction
- 1975 — 51st Hoosier Salon — Lion In the Rocks, Honorable Mention
- 1976 — 44th Indiana Artists Club — Hillcrest Gate, Indiana Artists Club Award
- 1978 — 54th Hoosier Salon — Double 0 Minus 7, L.S. Ayres & Co. Best of Show
- 1979 — 47th Indiana Artists Club — Evetta, Hyatt Regency Award
- 1980 — 56th Hoosier Salon — Sleeping Lion, Jury Prize of Distinction
- 1980 — Indiana State Fair — Madame Farfan's Torso, 2nd Prize in Sculpture
- 1980 — 48th Indiana Artists Club — Graffiti, Indiana Artists Club Award
- 1981 — 57th Hoosier Salon — Calliope, Jury Prize of Distinction
