= VH-3 =

Rescue Squadron 3 (VH-3)
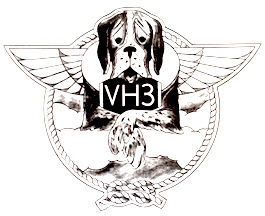
- Active: August 1944 - April 1946
- Country: United States of America
- Branch: United States Navy
- Type: squadron
- Role: Dumbo (air-sea rescue)
- Engagements: Asiatic-Pacific Campaign Medal: Iwo Jima Operation; Okinawa Gunto Operation; 3rd Fleet Operations against Japan

- Decorations: Navy Unit Commendation

Aircraft flown
- Patrol: Martin PBM-3R/5 Mariner

VH-3 (Rescue Squadron 3) was one of six dedicated VH rescue squadrons of the U.S. Navy during WW II. Prior to their creation, the rescue function was performed as an additional "spur of the moment" duty by regularly operating patrol squadrons. The Fleet Commanders made clear "that the men who risked their lives to rocket, bomb, and strafe the enemy wherever and whenever possible, should under no circumstances, be left to fend for themselves when disaster struck them." After the war the Japanese related that they could not understand why so much was risked to save airmen. This was a tremendous morale builder for the flyers, but there was a cold calculated logic behind this as well. It meant that very expensively trained and experienced aviators could be rescued from a watery grave or brutal captivity and put back into the fight. American aircrews captured after being shot down over the Japanese home islands faced a grim fate. VH-3 squadron members related "how intense, intense every crew member became .. over this business of saving lives", "the marvelous feeling of reward when saving a downed pilot's life", and "nose-thumbing at the Japanese military .. when we swiped near-prisoners under their eye".

== Overview ==
In the closing 5 months of World War II, VH-3 rescued 183 downed air crewmen and sailors in the open seas - some while under heavy fire. VH-3 also assisted in the additional rescue of 54 men when the seas were too rough for a landing, and a surface ship or submarine was required to complete the rescue. This was dangerous work. Survivors in the water and the planes making rescues were regularly harassed by enemy surface craft, shore fire, and aircraft. VH-3 planes, with survivors on board, were saved from attacking fighters by their own fighter escort on several occasions. In another instance, while in the midst of a rescue landing under very accurate fire, a fighter escort covering the rescue was itself shot down and VH-3 rescued this pilot as well.

VH-3 was awarded the Navy Unit Commendation award for the period from 29 March 1945 to 30 June 1945. It had been enthusiastically recommended for the higher Presidential Unit Citation (endorsed by most of the carrier task force commanders), but this was not granted probably due to VH-3's perceived role as only supporting offensive operations. Several VH-3 pilots were recognized for their (and their crew's) heroism with the Navy Cross, the Silver Star, and the Distinguished Flying Cross. In these cases, the air crews of those pilots would be awarded a lesser award (usually the Air Medal).

The squadron was composed of 6 PBM Mariner aircraft shared by 9 different 12-man crews. Six replacement crews came on board to relieve crews that had reached 20 missions. They were initially assigned the PBM-3R and then later the fully armed PBM-5. At least 5 of their PBM's were declared a loss after suffering major damage during rescue operations and one shoot down by their own fleet.

One key capability of the PBM was its JATO rocket-assisted takeoff, which generated extra lift, allowing the PBM to take off in under 10 seconds versus about a minute without. This was critical for taking off in heavy seas under heavy load or under fire. Another key capability of the PBMs was that they were seaworthy boats if need be. On a number of its missions, VH-3 would land its PBMs in less rough seas close to shore and then taxi many miles to the rescue site. JATO allowed them to take off in seas they could not land in. In one rescue, after a very rough landing had caused severe structural damage making the plane unflyable, a PBM taxied 150 miles (240 km) back to base in open seas.

There were 12 crewman on board. There were three officers (2 pilots and 1 navigator), 2 Aviation Machinist Mates to keep all aviation systems functioning, 2 Radiomen, 2 Aviation Ordnancemen for all armament (including rocket canisters for JATO takeoff), 1 Pharmacist Mate to care for the wounded survivors, and 2 air crewmen. Everybody was cross trained out of necessity. There were more machine guns to man than there were Ordnancemen. Open sea rescues were physically demanding work, and everybody pitched in to load and care for the survivors. The words of one survivor of a kamikaze attack rescued by VH-3 bears witness to the commotion of a PBM during operations:

"My battle station was in No. 1 gun. When ordered to abandon ship, I jumped and the wake of the ship almost pulled me under....I swam for about thirty minutes without a life jacket and found a raft with other men on it....picked up by rescue plane.... a lot of commotion... the plane's crew was running back and forth.... there was a Japanese fighter plane on their tail but was driven off by the Corsairs..... kept praying and saying 'let's not get shot down now'.... one man died of wounds...."

VH-3 performed many long range and long duration rescue missions. PBMs would fly hundreds of miles to stage on a standby station in readiness for planned air raids on Japanese forces in China, Korea, and the Japanese home islands. This allowed them to more quickly pick up survivors and hopefully enjoy the protection of the fighter planes escorting the attack aircraft. When sea conditions were too rough for a landing, PBMs would provide cover and aid until submarines could complete the rescue. Rescues were also assisted by the USAAF Dumbo drops of lifeboats. Many rescues occurred just in a nick of time due to the close coordination between bomber groups, attack squadrons, fighter escorts, surface ships, submarines, and the rescue squadrons of both the Navy and USAAF.

== Operational history ==
- August 1944: VH-3 was established at NAS Alameda, California.
- October 1944: VH-3 flew to NAS Kaneohe Bay to continue training.
- December 1944: VH-3 flies to Eniwetok Atoll and then onto Saipan.
- January 1945: VH-3 commences rescue operations based out of Tanapag Harbor in Saipan in support of the Invasion of Iwo Jima and B-29 strikes against Japan. The squadron loses two planes when both lose all engines in mid flight for unknown reasons. Both crews are rescued by surface ships after being located by sister rescue squadron VH-1. The squadron is grounded for two weeks during an investigation of cause. Between the period from 23 February 1945 and 11 March 1945, VH-3 locates and directs surface ships to 31 survivors from 3 downed B-29 crews. On 3 March 1945, Lt Kouns makes the squadron's first open sea landing and rescue of a lone survivor of a B-29 crew.
- 28 March 1945: VH-3 flies to Kerama Retto and immediately commences rescue operations in support of the Okinawa Campaign and the ongoing air campaign against the Japanese home islands and other occupied territory. Rescue operations continue through to the end of the war. During this time, VH-3 made 77 open sea landings to rescue 183 survivors. They also assisted with the rescue of 54 others. Several of these rescues are further detailed.
- 1 April 1945: Invasion of Okinawa commences. Within hours the aggressive standard by which VH-3 will conduct itself for the rest of the war is set by their squadron commander, Lt. Comdr. Bonvillian, who is awarded the first of his 3 Distinguished Flying Crosses. He rescues the crew of a Grumman TBF Avenger from VT-29 that had been shot down onshore and then had managed to scramble into the water with their raft to await rescue. Bonvillian landed within the main enemy held harbor 500 yards offshore and then taxied through the coral reef to within 200 yards of shore to effect the rescue of the 3 aircrew. The PBM came under attack from small arms fire and a Japanese surface craft during the rescue, but was saved by two Grumman F6F Hellcat fighters that blasted the harassing enemy craft.
- 30 April 1945: Lt Edgar Palm of VH-3 earns the Distinguished Flying Cross by rescuing a fighter pilot from VF-9 while under shore battery fire at Kikaijima. Lt Palm's aircrew are credited in a separate action on 3 June 1945 with the shoot down of a VAL bomber that challenged them.
- 12 May 1945: Lt Eddy of VH-3 rescues 13 airmen from a downed PBM piloted by Lt Simms in Patrol Bombing squadron VPB-21. The day before they had been shot down after an hour and a half engagement with 5 Tojo fighters, but not before splashing one of the attacking fighters. VH-3's rescue PBM makes a violent landing in 15 foot swells, causing much structural damage. They risk a takeoff and gingerly make their way back to complete the rescue. The damage to VH-3's PBM is determined to be too severe for repair and it is declared a loss. There are points worth mentioning, unrelated to this rescue, about both the rescued and rescuing pilots. The rescued Lt Simms had previously been cited in dispatches for his role in locating and tracking for 5 hours the Japanese battleship Yamato until carrier based planes could destroy her. He also assisted in the rescue of a downed fighter pilot during the Yamato action. The rescuer Lt Eddy had previously been awarded the Silver Star when he was with VP-102, which was sacrificed during the Japanese conquest of the Philippines. He was a crew member on one of the last two PBY Catalinas flying out senior personnel and army nurses to Australia prior to Fall of Corregidor.
- 27 May 1945: The USS Braine is hit by two Kamikaze planes, suffering 67 dead and 102 wounded which is the highest casualties by a destroyer that did not sink. Some are thrown into the water from the force of the explosions. Part of the crew are isolated and trapped by fires and are ordered to abandon ship, taking the wounded with them into the water. Many are attacked by sharks in a feeding frenzy. A PBM-5 from VH-3 piloted by Lt Kouns lands in moderate swells and rescues 10 wounded survivors from the water, but one dies en route to the hospital ship of burns and wounds. A Japanese fighter tailing the PBM is driven off by F4U Corsairs.
- 2 June 1945: Lt Robert Dorton of VH-3 earns the Navy Cross rescuing 12 survivors of two stricken planes while under heavy anti-aircraft fire. A fighter pilot from VBF-9 off the USS Yorktown was downed in Kagoshima Bay in Kyushu. A PB2Y Coronado from VPB-13 capsizes while attempting a rescue, resulting in 12 aircrewman in the water. Lt Dorton lands a 0.5 miles (0.80 km) off the beach under continuous heavy fire and rescues the 12.
- 15 June 1945 through 1 July 1945: Replacement crews "reported on board" to relieve 6 of the original squadron crews that had reached 20 missions.
- 17 June 1945: While protecting a rescue landing under very accurate fire, one of VH-3's fighter escort from VMF-314 is shot down by AA fire off of Kikaijima. Lt Lofgren of VH-3, who made the landing, diverts and taxis to rescue this newly downed pilot. Lt Blumenstock of VH-3, under the same very intense AA fire, makes a landing to rescue the first downed F4U pilot also of VMF-314, and he is awarded the Distinguished Flying Cross for this rescue.
- 20 June 1945: Lt Cmdr William Bonvillian of VH-3 earns the Silver Star for the rescue of 15 survivors of two stricken planes. After determining the seas were too heavy to safely land nearby the downed planes, Bonvillian chose to land under fire close to shore, then taxied 30 miles through heavy seas to get to the survivors and complete the rescue.
- 18 July 1945: The 12 man crew of a B-24 bomber from the 494th Bombardment Group, which has been badly damaged on a bombing mission near Shanghai, are forced to bail out after three engines fail. The next day 7 survivors are located and rescued by Lt (jg) Sudlow of VH-3.
- 24 July 1944: An F4U Corsair fighter pilot (Lt Heck) from VF-9 of the USS Yorktown is knocked down by anti-aircraft fire right off the waterfront of Kobe. Lt (jg) Robert MacGill of VH-3 is awarded the Silver Star for rescuing the pilot in what one war correspondent described as "perhaps the most daring and the most spectacular of all Pacific air-sea rescues", the first into the Inland Sea of Japan off the Japanese mainland, with the downed pilot within sight of people walking the streets of Kobe. Lt Heck had been floating in Kobe Harbor for 5 hours when MacGill's PBM arrived. At the time Japanese surface craft attempting to capture Lt Heck were being driven away and strafed by an escort of F4U Corsairs providing cover. Lt MacGill made a landing approach that took him over the city and docks of Kobe and out into the harbor in order to make a quick grab and JATO take-off after the rescue. A Japanese fighter made a run at the PBM and the shore batteries opened up with anti-aircraft fire. The Corsair escort knocked down an attacking fighter and then had to leave due to low fuel. After having secured Heck, the next problem was how to get back to Okinawa with remaining fuel. The flight engineer leaned out the fuel mixture and the airspeed was reduced to extend range. With their fighter escort gone, they returned at 300 feet altitude to avoid enemy fighters. Because of fuel concerns they hugged the Japanese coast to reduce their return distance, and so they were peppered by anti-aircraft fire from shore batteries along the coast as they made their way back. They returned after 14 hours, having been given up for lost. There is controversy over the medals awarded for this rescue. It was documented at the time that Lt MacGill had been recommended for the Navy Cross, but it was not documented that his entire crew had been promised the Silver Star. In the resulting snafu, all were given a lesser award. Senator Daniel Patrick Moynihan brought this to the US Senate's attention and caused a review by the US Navy, but the outcome of this is unknown from available sources.
- 25 July 1945: Lt jg Samuel Adams Davis of VH-3 earns the Navy Cross for making two landings in the Inland Sea of Japan while under shore fire and without fighter escort to rescue 3 downed airmen.
- 25 July 1945: The lone survivor of a 12-man crew of a B-24 from 864th Bombardment Squadron is rescued by Lt (jg) Sudlow of VH-3. The damaged B-24 was limping back from a bombing mission over Kyushu when it caught fire and a wing broke off. The turret gunner bailed out by diving through the hole in the fuselage caused by the wing breaking off.
- 28 July 1945: Lt jg K.B. Lee rescues 17 survivors from 3 stricken planes from the Bungo Channel offshore of Kyushu, and he is awarded the Distinguished Flying Cross. Two airmen from a Curtiss SB2C Helldiver from VB-1 off the USS Bennington had been in the water for 4 days. They were rescued by another PBM from VPB-21, but that PBM (with a crew of 12) became stricken after dropping both its engines and one wing float during the rough landing. VH-3 was sent in to pick up these survivors. Lt (jg) K.B. Lee managed to land safely in the same rough sea conditions that damaged the first PBM and then did a JATO takeoff with survivors on board. Lee later spotted 3 more survivors from a downed TBF Avenger from VT-94 off the USS Enterprise. Lee made another sea landing and rescued these three as well.
- 29 July 1945: A B-25 bomber from 41st Bombardment Group, which has been heavily damaged on a bombing mission, crashes into the sea on fire at 125 knots. Only 3 of the 6 crew members survive the crash and escape into the water. They spend a night in the sea before they are located by Lt (jg) Sudlow of VH-3. Due to bad sea conditions, the PBM circles their location until rescue can be effected by the submarine USS Batfish.
- 9 August 1945: VH-3 makes its final rescue before the end of hostilities. LT jg K.B. Lee rescues a P-47 Thunderbolt pilot of the 413th Fighter Group off Kyushu who had bailed out after receiving AA damage.
- 13 August 1945: VH-3 flies back to Tanapag Harbor, Saipan.
- September 1945: The US conducted several demonstrations of air power over Japan using 600 B-29's at a time to convince the Japanese to honor the surrender. There had been several instances where US planes were attacked after the ceasefire by rogue Japanese fighter units that could not bear to see American bombers flying serenely over a devastated Tokyo. At the same time, huge armadas of air planes were flying back to the states. Planes continued to be lost in the open sea. VH-3 performed 15 missions in support of this activity, including 2 rescue missions with survivors.
- October 1945: VH-3 returns to NAS Kaneohe Bay, Hawaii.
- April 1946: VH-3 was disestablished at NAS Kaneohe Bay, Hawaii.

== Number rescued by each pilot and missions flown ==
A table has been compiled to document the achievements of all known pilots (i.e. Plane Commanders) with at least one rescue.

Pilot	Rescues	Assists	Combat Missions	Documented Decoration
Lt Cmdr Barrett	8		5+	Distinguished Flying Cross
Lt Blumenstock	2		10+	Distinguished Flying Cross
Lt Cmdr Bonvillian	30	12	20+	Silver Star
Lt (jg) Davis	3		5+	Navy Cross
Lt Dorton	15		15+	Navy Cross
Lt Dunn	10		20+	
Lt Eddy	24		20+	Distinguished Flying Cross + prior Silver Star
Lt Grinstead		8	?	
Lt Kouns	25		20+	
Lt (jg) Lee	18	1	5+	Distinguished Flying Cross
Lt (jg) Lofgren	2	6	10+	
Lt (jg) MacGill	2		5+	Silver Star
Lt Mansueto	12	11	20+	Silver Star
Lt Palm	5		20+	Distinguished Flying Cross
Lt (jg) Scarborough		7		
Lt Solomon	7		20+	
Lt (jg) Sudlow	15	3	5+	
Lt Watson	3		20+	

== Map of Operations ==
VH-3's rescues spanned from the Northern Mariana Islands, deep into the Inland Sea of Japan, down the entire Ryukyus chain, out to China and approaching Korea.

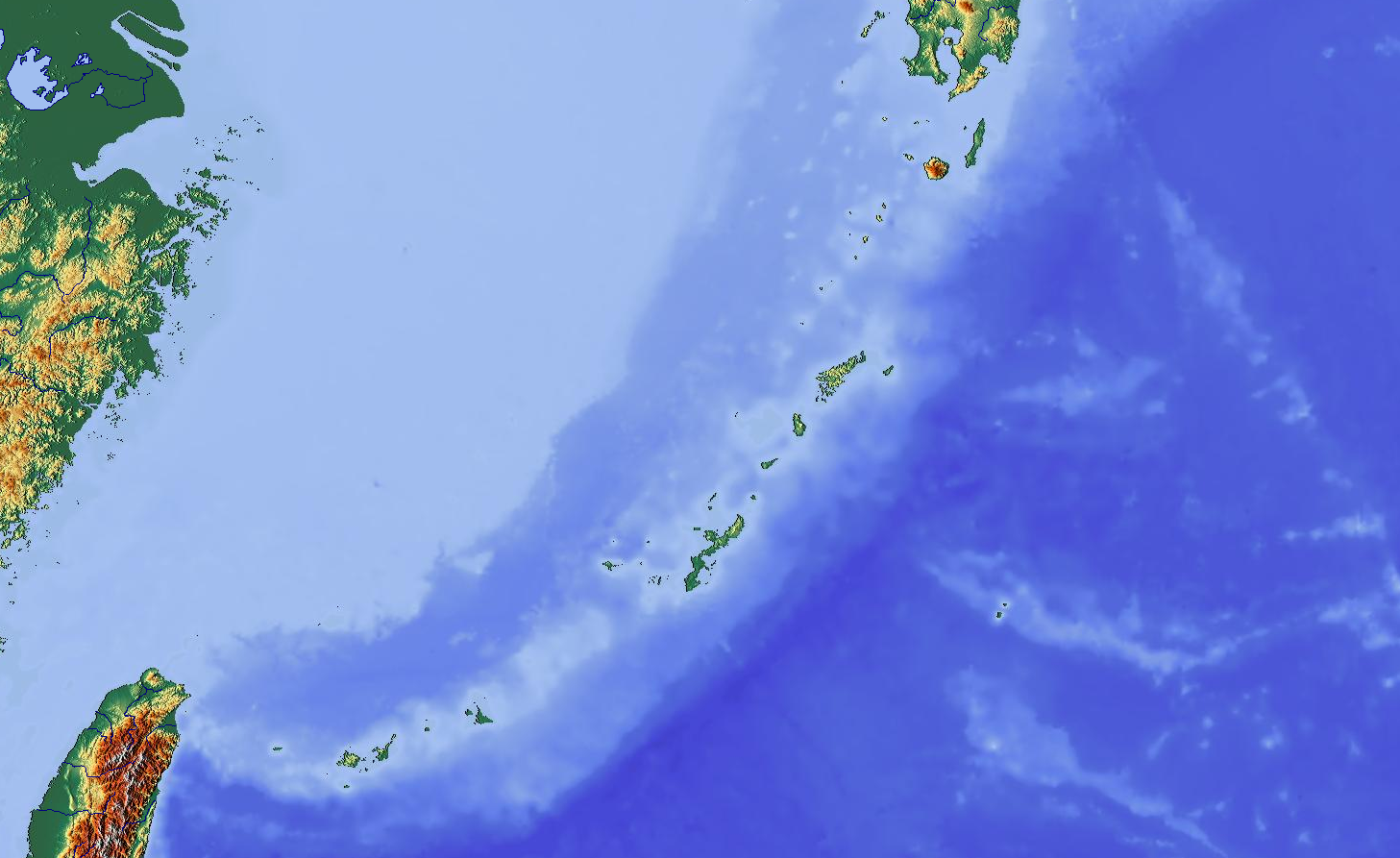
VH-3 Rescue Locations in the Ryukyus.

== Artistic Depictions of VH-3 ==
The famous artist Robert Edward Weaver was a crew member in VH-3 and designed the insignia of VH-3 showing a concerned St Bernard dog with wings and a Mae-West looking down from aloft on a cloud. He also created many artistic depictions chronicling VH-3. He took part in rescues, including the one on 1 April 1945 described above in the Operational History section, and this was the inspiration for one of his drawings. His work Survivors portrays two exhausted rescued pilots safe inside a PBM in a manner that looks almost like monks at prayer inside a church. There is a website and Facebook page devoted to his life and art.

== Home port assignments ==
The squadron was assigned to these home ports, effective on the dates shown:

- NAS Alameda, California - August 1944
- NAS Kaneohe Bay, Hawaii - October 1945

== See also ==
- Dumbo (air-sea rescue)
- Seaplane tender
- Flying boat
- Air-sea rescue
- List of inactive United States Navy aircraft squadrons
