= Young Abe Lincoln =

1962 public artwork by David K. Rubins

- Artist: David K. Rubins
- Year: 1962
- Type: Bronze sculpture
- Dimensions: 274.32 cm × 76.20 cm × 97.79 cm (108 in × 30 in × 38.5 in)
- Location: Indiana Statehouse, Indianapolis
- Coordinates: 39°46′6.74″N 86°9′54.65″W
- Owner: Indiana Statehouse

Young Abe Lincoln, is a 1962 public artwork by American artist David K. Rubins, located outside of the government center near the Indiana State House, in Indianapolis, Indiana, US. This bronze sculpture is a depiction of a young Abraham Lincoln, an Abraham Lincoln that spent the majority of his formative years in Indiana.

== Description ==
Young Abe Lincoln is an oversized, rough style bronze sculpture of an adolescent Abraham Lincoln. He wears a shirt, pants raised above the ankle and is barefoot. His left hand holds a book with the index finger holding his place. The sculpture sits outside of the Indiana Government Center in Indianapolis, which is adjacent to the Indiana Statehouse. The sculpture measures 108 inches in height by 30 inches in width by 38 1/2 in depth and sits upon a red granite tripartite pedestal that measures 74 inches in height by 82 inches in width by 92 inches in depth. It weighs over 1,500 pounds. A foundry mark can be seen on the front of the pedestal MODERN/ART/FDRY/N.Y. The artist signature (D.K. Rubins) and copyright date (1962) can be seen on the rear, proper right side base of the sculpture.

Based on a forty six inch plaster mold, a three-dimensional pantograph was used to create a rough, hollow framework of the full-size model of the sculpture from wood. The surface layer of this framework was coated with a layer of oil-base non-hardening clay called plastelene and then the detail work of the sculpture was done by hand.

A plaster mold was placed over the finished clay framework and allowed to dry. The mold was then removed, creating a positive plaster cast of the framework. This cast is a replica of the clay covered framework.

The lost-wax casting method was then used to create the actual bronze sculpture. This process took over five months to complete.

Placard in front of Young Abe Lincoln sculpture

The thoughts that concerned me most in making this statue were the necessities of representing a vital energy, lean physical strength, and a tree-like growth suggestive of the strong roots of character that were growing and manifest as early as his Indiana years. In the rather knotty and active forms of the body, I have tried to express that, as well as the rough warmth of his frontier humanity and the ungainliness of his bony frame.

In the simple but rough-surfaced pedestal, and in the quiet shadowed, thoughtful head, I wanted to suggest the very simple, classic character of his mind - as well as the loneliness and tragedy of his life.

In the hair, I tried for boyishness and humor. I felt it unimportant to invent a purely imaginary portrait of how Lincoln might have looked at twenty-one years. Our knowledge of his appearance, on which the popular symbol of Lincoln is based, is from photographs taken after his fortieth year; my face, therefore, is a compromise between the unknown Indiana youth and the pre-presidential Illinois lawyer.

The true look of Lincoln during his Indiana years is as unimportant as the historical accuracy of his clothing. In favor of representing his character and his contemporary significance to the best advantage, I have subordinated every literal element except the book. In the light of Lincoln's whole life, the axe is unimportant as the book.

The placement of the figure was chosen for two reasons: I felt that Lincoln should be placed back among the trees on the plaza, since the forest was his Indiana experience; and it would be difficult to compete in scale with the open plaza and building were the figure to be placed in the open. Too large a figure in sculpture produces an inhuman and unreal effect.

— David K. Rubins,

In 1992, Save Outdoor Sculpture! surveyed this piece and found it to be well maintained.

== Historical information ==
This sculpture was created as a commissioned piece for winning a competition to decorate the Indiana State Office Building, The Indiana Employment Security Building, or the Adjacent Plaza in Indianapolis, Indiana. As part of the competition, which was conducted in 1959, the artist was free to choose his own subject matter, location, size of work and whatever material deemed necessary. There were the following suggestions however:

1. Lincoln was an appropriate theme for the Indiana Government area because Indiana was where he had spent a lot of his youth and where he later visited.
2. The Seal of the State be used somewhere and that Indiana be recognizable in the piece.
3. A possible location be the square area extending into the northeast corner of the reflecting pool.
4. The interior of the entrance lobby of the State Office Building is also another option for placement of an appropriate relief of free-standing sculpture.
5. The piece should have a contemporary feel to it, suitable to the times and architecture of the two buildings.

As part of the competition each artist was to deliver a small scale plaster model or sketch of their work and letter of explanation to the Indiana State Office Building Commission located on the third floor of the building located at 309 West Washington Street, Indianapolis, Indiana by no later than Tuesday, December 1, 1959. Below is a list of artists that an invitation was sent to:

- Anthony Lauck, University of Notre Dame
- Ivan Meštrović, University of Notre Dame
- Robert Laurent, Indiana University, Department of Fine Arts
- Harry Engel, Indiana University, Department of Fine Arts
- Rudy Pozzatti, Indiana University, Department of Fine Arts
- Garo Antreasian, John Herron Art Institute
- David Rubins, John Herron Art Institute
- Donald Mattison, John Herron Art Institute
- Robert Weaver
- James Snodgrass, Contemporary Art Workshop
- Will Lamm
- Harold Elgar
- Richard Peeler
- Adolph Wolter
- Walter Lohman
- Warner Williams, Culver Military Academy
- Henrik Wueberkrop

The pieces were judged by a jury, chosen by the State Office Building Commission, composed of Wilbur D. Peat (Director of the John Herron Art Museum), Henry Hope (Chairman of the Art Department at Indiana University), A. Reid Winsey (Chairman of the Art Department of DePauw University), representatives of the architectural firms who designed the office building (Graham, Anderson, Probst & White and Raymond S. Kastendieck & Associates), and representatives of Associated Indiana Architects and architects for the Employment Security Building. The chosen pieces were given a $500 retainer to present a larger finished model for a second judging.

David K. Rubins submitted a 12-inch high model in sculptor's parlance originally and then created a forty six inch plaster model which was selected by the jury as the official sculpture winner. Rubins was then given $32,700 and two years to create the actual statue. On September 26, 1963, Rubins' Young Abe was dedicated to great enthusiasm. Garo Z. Antreasian was selected as the official mural winner.

=== Controversy ===
The creation of this sculpture was postponed several times due to controversy dealing with funding for this piece and because there were arguments of foul play when the winners of the competition were finally chosen.

Many citizens of Indianapolis were upset because their tax money was being used to commission this piece. Many thought the money allocated for this artwork could be used for other things, such as helping the mentally handicapped. It was thought that there were already enough memorials commemorating Lincoln in the state of Indiana. $100,000 was allocated for the creation of both the sculpture and the mural in the construction budget of the building. Wilbur D. Peat, Director of the Herron Art Museum in 1960, thought:

Art has a place in this building. It will not be a needless luxury or waste of public funds. I don't think the public is so lacking in appreciation that it wants public buildings bare and unadorned.

Will Lamm, an entrant in the competition, claimed that the judging committee accepted entrants after the official deadline of December 7, 1959 had passed. He also claimed that at least one member of the committee telephoned the artist, David K. Rubins, after the deadline urging him to submit an entry. Rubins did not submit his entry until December 8, 1959, when the committee meeting to decide the winners was held. It was also added by Lamm that three of the seven judges on the committee were absent when the winners were chosen and the original sculpture idea turned in by Rubins was not created in plaster, as stated in the invitation letter to the artists.

Lamm was told by a committee member that his idea might have won had they not accepted the late entry. Many people, including Wilbur D. Peat, Director of the John Herron Art Museum and chairman of the selection committee, brushed Lamm's accusations off as him being a sore loser.

John A. Whitehead, Director of the State Office Building Commission, rejected the notion that late entries were accepted. He stated that several of the artists were contacted on the day of judging to determine whether their expected entries would be turned in. Some artists had asked for extensions. He also said it didn't make a difference whether the sculptures were entered in plaster or of another material.

It was also controversial that throughout the judging process photography of the potential artworks were banned.

Lamm's entry was a sculpture portraying Lincoln's departure from his family to going off on his own. It included a group of seven figures.

Indiana Governor Matthew E. Welsh recommended that new State Office Building Commission urge the Virginia Engineering Co., the building's general contractor, to send Rubin a letter postponing the creation of the sculpture. Welsh was an advocate of the art finances being used for the state's program for mentally handicapped. Rubin answered this letter by stating his continuation of the project and that he was going to go ahead and draw up a contract with the architects. He already had a signed contract from the Virginia Engineering Co. after the former commission approved the expenditures for the statue and mural at $68,000.

=== Location history ===
There were several suggestions for the location of this statue on or around the Indiana Statehouse grounds. The Orchard Area, the upper terrace outside the lobby and the center line of the walkway which extends south towards the Indiana Employment Security Building were some suggestions.

Created to reside in the state office building plaza, the sculpture was originally located about half a block east of its present location, facing Senate Avenue. It was moved outside of the Government Center off of West Street and Robert D. Orr Ave in 1992.

== Artist ==
David K. Rubins, a native of Minneapolis, studied at the Beaux Arts Institute of Design in New York and the Académie Julian and the École nationale supérieure des Beaux-Arts in Paris. Rubins worked closely with James Earle Fraser, designer of the Buffalo nickel and End of the Trail, for seven years in New York. His awards include the Paris Prize in Sculpture (1924), the Prix de Rome (1928), Fellow in Sculpture Award from the American Academy in Rome and the Grant and Sculpture Award from the National Institute of Arts and Letters.

Rubins moved to Indianapolis, Indiana in 1935 to join the faculty at the John Herron Art Institute where he taught until 1967 and then an additional three years after the Herron Art Institute merged with Indiana University. He held the chairmanship of the sculpture department from 1935 to 1968. In 1970, Rubins retired and became an artist-in-residence at Herron. In 1954, Rubins book, The Human Figure, an Anatomy for Artists, was published. Other Indianapolis works of art Rubins is known for is the bust of late Indiana Governor Henry Schricker, the Eli Lilly monument in Crown Hill Cemetery, and a bust of Evans Wollens Sr.

Rubins' work has been exhibited at the Minneapolis Institute of Art, National Academy of Design, Indianapolis Museum of Art, Architectural League of New York, and the "American Sculpture Today" show at the Metropolitan Museum of Art in New York.

Rubins' inspiration for Young Abe Lincoln came after reading several books on Lincoln and his life, as well as looking at other sculptures of Lincoln. Some of these others sculptures included the Abraham Lincoln statue at the Lincoln Memorial in Washington, D.C., the Mount Rushmore depiction by Gutzon Borglum, and the Lincoln sculpture by Henry Hering in Indianapolis' University Park.

== See also ==
- List of statues of Abraham Lincoln
- Henry F. Schricker Bust
- Here I Grew Up
- James Earle Fraser
- Lincoln Memorial
- Mount Rushmore
- Gutzon Borglum
- Henry Hering
- List of sculptures of presidents of the United States
