= Bust of Henry F. Schricker =

Public artwork by David K. Rubins

- Artist: David K. Rubins
- Year: 1964
- Type: Bronze and limestone
- Dimensions: 120 cm × 74 cm × 56 cm (49 in × 29 in × 22 in)
- Location: Indianapolis State House, Indianapolis; 39°46′7″N 86°9′46″W
- Owner: The State of Indiana

Bust of Henry F. Schricker, is a public artwork by American artist David K. Rubins, located in the Indiana State House, which is in Indianapolis, Indiana, United States. It is a bronze bust of former Indiana governor Henry F. Schricker. The bust and its base are 49 inches high, 29 inches wide, and 22 inches long. The bust itself is 33.5 inches high on a 15.5 inch high base. It was installed in the southeast alcove of the Indiana State House in 1964 and faces east.

== Description ==
The bust is of bronze with a wax patina, cast with the lost-wax method. It depicts Governor Schricker staring ahead and wearing a shirt, tie, vest, and jacket with a large rock formation behind him. At the bottom of the bust on the proper left side is a maker's mark that reads "Rubins 64." The bust is hollow and appears to be cast of a single piece.

The bust sits upon a roughly cubical limestone base fronted with a bronze plaque that identifies Henry F. Schricker as the thirty-fourth and thirty-eighth governor of Indiana and supplies the dates of his governorships. The entire work is held in place by a pair of threaded rods that run up into the base and down into the bottom of the alcove.

The bust weighs 1,200 pounds.

== Historical information ==
The bust was dedicated on November 11, 1964, in a ceremony that drew over 350 people. Former governor Schricker attended with his wife and their six grandchildren unveiled the bust before the reading of a message from then-president Lyndon B. Johnson. The bust displaced a bust of Abraham Lincoln, which was moved to an alcove on the west side of the State House. It was honored so because Shricker was thought by Hoosiers to be an "ideal governor." The bust cost $3,500 and was paid for by the governor's contingency fund.

Sculptor Rubins placed the bust of Governor Schricker on a rock in order "to establish the deep strength of the man." It also serves the practical purpose of filling out the extra space in the alcove in which the bust sits.

== Artist ==
David Kresz Rubins was born in Minneapolis in 1902. As a young man, he apprenticed to J. E. Fraser before moving on to study at Dartmouth College and the Beaux-Arts Institute of Design in New York. He then traveled to Europe to study in Paris, where he was awarded the Paris Prize in Sculpture. He was a fellow of the American Academy in Rome from 1928 to 1931. He joined the faculty of the Herron School of Art in Indianapolis in 1935. While there, he taught drawing, anatomy, ceramics, and sculpture. He also authored a textbook, The Human Figure: An Anatomy for Artists, in 1953.

Rubins’ work includes the statue of Young Abraham Lincoln outside the Indiana State House, a number of plaques at Riley Hospital, and the sculpture of Henry F. Schricker.

Rubins retired from teaching in 1970, three years after Herron became a part of Indiana University. He was named Professor Emeritus in 1981. He died in 1985 at the age of 82.

== See also ==
- Young Abe Lincoln
