= VH-1 (rescue squadron) =

VH-1 (Rescue Squadron 1) was one of six dedicated (VH) Rescue Squadrons of the U.S. Navy during WWII. VH-1 made 19 direct rescues via open sea landings. It also assisted in the rescue of (at least) another 119 air crewman by locating them and directing surface vessels to effect the rescue. VH-1 was established on 1 February 1944 and disestablished in April 1946. The squadron employed the Consolidated PB2Y Coronado and the Martin PBM Mariner during its operations.

== Operational history ==
- 1 February 1944: VH-1 was established at NAS Alameda, California..
- 1 June 1944: VH-1 commences rescue operations based out of Saipan.
- 22 June 1944: Lt Sharp is awarded the Air Medal for the open sea landing and rescue of two downed airmen.
- 16 September 1944: VH-1 temporarily relocates operations to Palau.
- mid-October 1944: VH-1 temporarily relocates operations to the Philippines for the Invasion of Leyte.
- November 1944: VH-1 locates 6 survivors from downed Boeing B-29 Superfortress heavy bombers and guides surface vessels to make the rescues.
- December 1944: VH-1 assists in the rescue of 30 aircrew from two B-29 Superfortress and a Consolidated B-24 Liberator by destroyers.
- January 1945: VH-1 assists in the rescue by surface vessels of 39 surviving aircrew from three B-29's, one Lockheed P-38 Lightning fighter, and two Martin PBM Mariner's. 27 of these survivors come from two PBMs of sister rescue squadron VH-3 which had crash landed after suffering engine failure.
- 10 February 1945: Lt Evans of VH-1 rescues the lone survivor of a B-24 that exploded mid-air after being hit by anti-aircraft fire, and he is awarded the Distinguished Flying Cross.
- March 1945: Lt Hutchinson of VH-1 rescues nine survivors of a downed B-29. VH-1 spots another nine downed airmen and directs surface vessels to their rescue.
- 27 April 1945: Lt Cmdr R.R. Barrett takes over command of VH-1. He had previously been the executive officer of VH-3 and had made eight rescues with VH-3 in April 1945 before reassigned to VH-1.
- June 1945: VH-1 spots 7 survivors in a life raft and directs USS Sea Fox (SS-402) to the rescue site.
- July 1945: VH-1 spots 28 survivors from 4 downed B-29s and directs surface vessels to effect the rescues.
- 1 August 1945: VH-1 relocates to Okinawa Island to relieve Rescue Squadron VH-3, which has been there since April. In the final week of the war, VH-1 makes 7 rescues of downed aviators.
- 12 August 1945: Lt (jg) McClure of VH-1 lands under fire from shore batteries one mile off of western Kyushu to pick up a badly burned pilot from the 318th Fighter Group as an enemy boat approached to make capture. McClure is awarded the Distinguished Flying Cross for this rescue.
- 24 December 1945: VH-1 relocates operations to Shanghai.
- April 1946: VH-1 was disestablished.

== See also ==
- Dumbo (air-sea rescue)
- Seaplane tender
- Flying boat
- Air-sea rescue
- List of inactive United States Navy aircraft squadrons
