= Harold H. Fisher =

American architect

Harold Hafer Fisher
- Born: October 28, 1901; Uniontown, Pennsylvania
- Died: November 28, 2005 (aged 104); Grosse Pointe Woods, Michigan
- Education: Beaux Arts Institute of Design, New York City
- Occupation: Architect
- Practice: Atelier Fulton

Harold Hafer Fisher (28 October 1901 – 2005) was an American church architect. He has been described as "a genius who designed over 500 churches with order, unity and beauty reflecting the majesty and transcendence of God".

== Biography ==
=== Early life ===
Fisher was born in 1901 in Uniontown, Pennsylvania, to Charles and Emma (McCoy) Fisher. He had a difficult childhood, being partially raised in an orphanage when his father was forced to leave the family to look for work and his mother could not feed her children.

Fisher was a precocious student who enjoyed drawing and painting.

=== Early professional years ===
Fisher was prolific in drawing and painting. His childhood oil paintings of biblical events attracted the attention of architect John Charles Fulton and son T. Ray Fulton who designed churches in forty-three of the then forty-eight states. The fifteen-year-old Fisher was recruited by Fulton to work as an apprentice draughtsman for $2 per day in his Uniontown, Pennsylvania office in the fall of 1916. Fisher had misrepresented his age as 27 so he could be hired. He worked six days per week as an apprentice. At night and on weekends he studied Beaux-Arts courses at the Beaux Arts Institute of Design in New York City. After graduation, he taught at Atelier Fulton in Pennsylvania for six years.

In 1922 he and a colleague, Charles Hines, started their own architectural office in Hagerstown, Maryland, but had to close their company after only a year. Fisher went back to Uniontown to work for Fulton until the Great Depression forced the office to close.

In the early 1940s Fisher tried to establish his own firm once again, but WWII had started. As a result he began working for the Austin company and Conover Engineering, supervising the conversion of Detroit's factories for wartime production. At the war's end, he finally fulfilled his dream by establishing Harold H. Fisher & Associates, an architectural firm devoted entirely to church architecture. That office was as of 2012 run by his sons until 2010.

=== Later professional years ===
Fisher worked until he was 102. He received an award for being the oldest working man.
