= Statue of Abraham Lincoln (Milwaukee) =

Statue of Abraham Lincoln by Gaetano Cecere

Abraham Lincoln
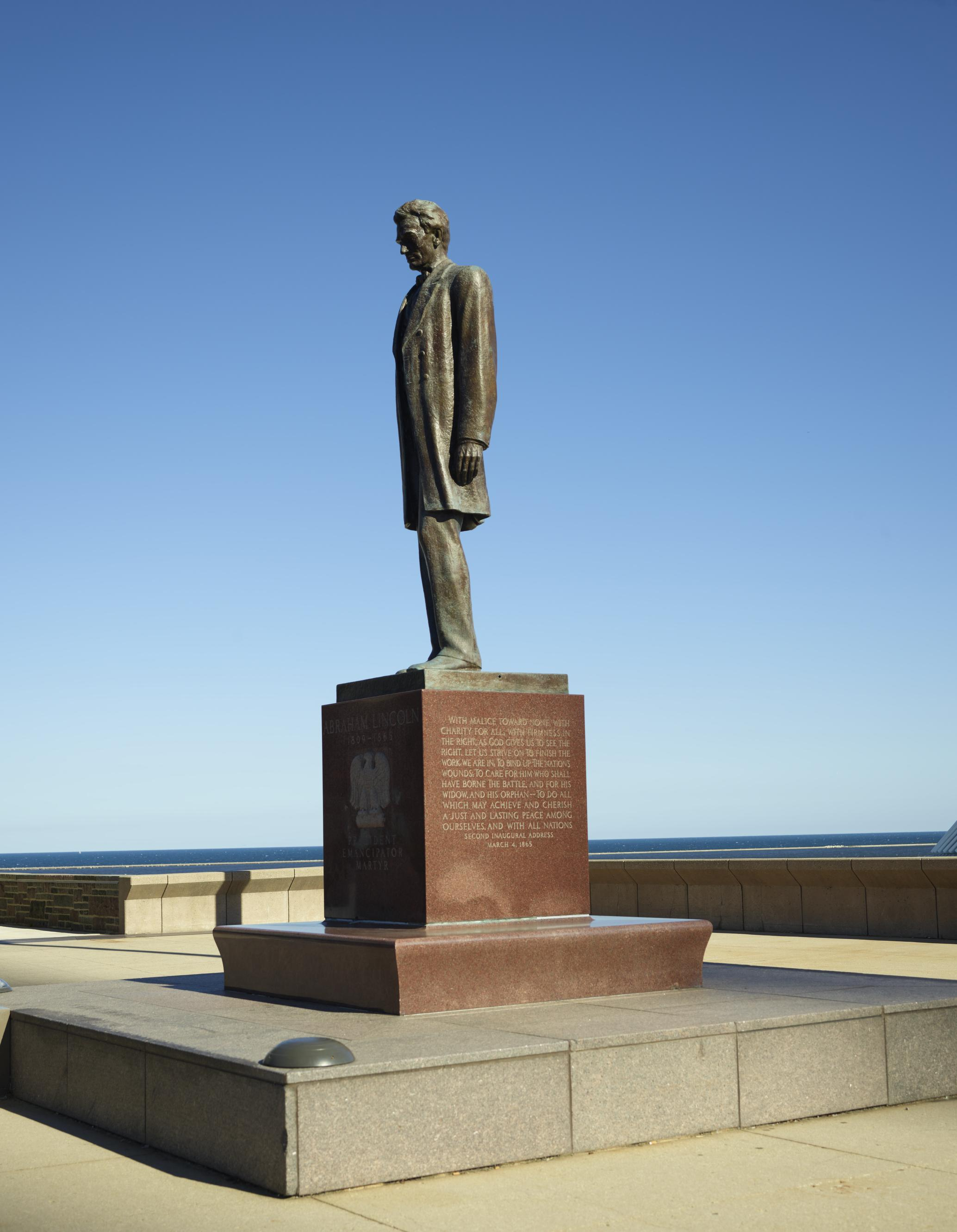
- Artist: Gaetano Cecere
- Year: 1934
- Type: bronze
- Dimensions: 320 cm (126 in)
- Location: Lincoln Memorial Drive, Milwaukee; 43°2′25.449″N 87°53′52.164″W
- Owner: Administered by Milwaukee County, Department of Parks, Recreation and Culture

A statue of Abraham Lincoln by American artist Gaetano Cecere is installed along Lincoln Memorial Drive in Milwaukee, Wisconsin, United States. The 10'6" bronze sculpture depicts a young beardless Abraham Lincoln. The former president stands looking down with both hands at his sides.

== Description ==
Gaetano Cecere's Abraham Lincoln stands tall at 10'6". The full-length portrait shows a young beardless Lincoln looking down. The cast bronze sculpture sits on a Wausau red granite pedestal. There are various inscriptions on the sculpture. The lower left corner of the back of the bronze base reads:

Gaetano Cecere, Sculptor 1934.

The lower right corner of the back of the bronze base reads:

Jno Williams, NY 1934

The front of the base reads:

ABRAHAM LINCOLN

1809–1865

PRESIDENT

EMANCIPATOR

MARTYR

The granite pedestal's west face reads:

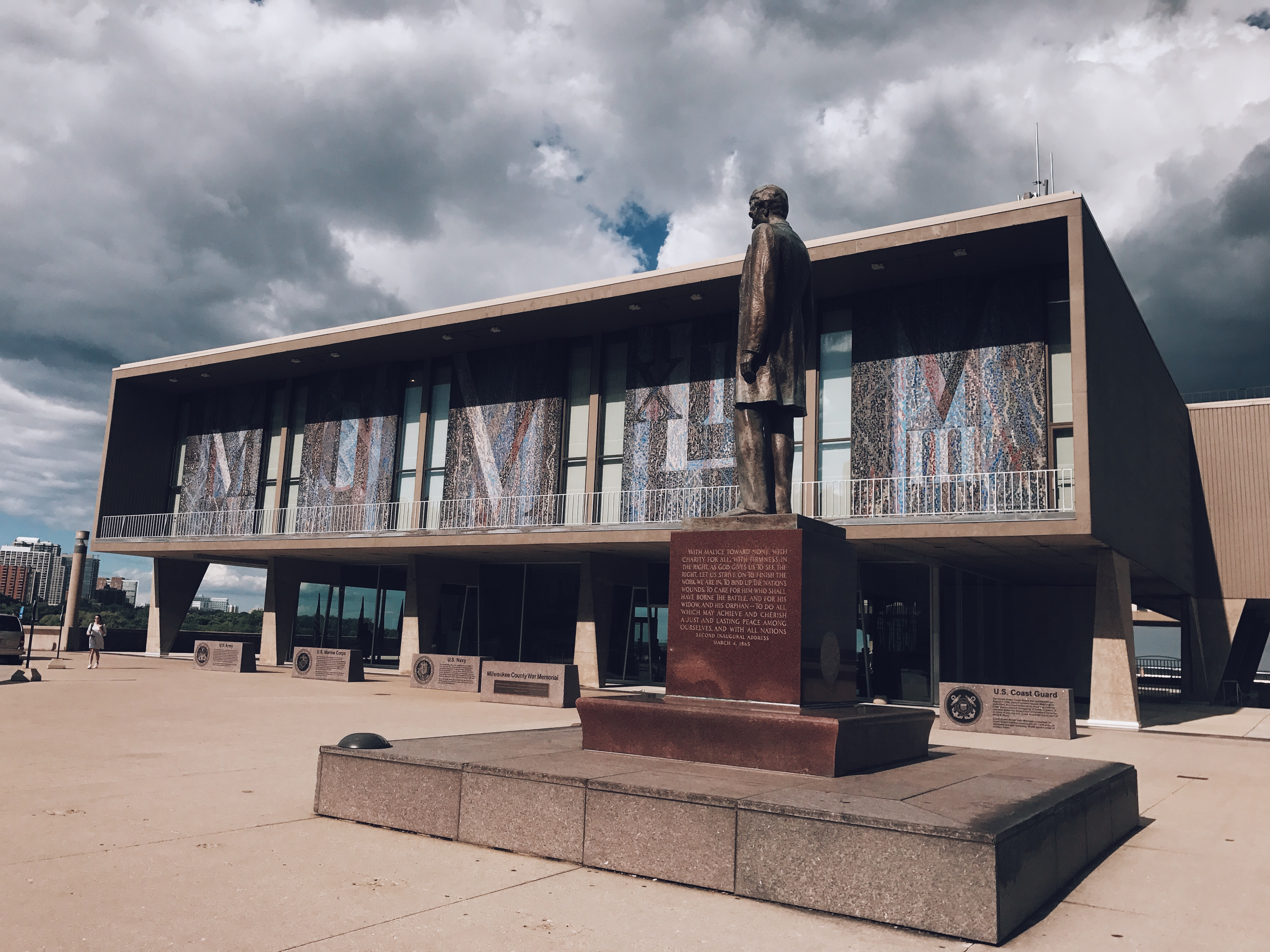

With malice toward none...and with all nations

— Second Inaugural address, March 4, 1865.

The pedestal's south face reads:

This monument is a gift of the Grand Army of the Republic, the school children, workingmen and citizens in general of the city of Milwaukee as an expression of their love, loyalty of country and reverence for a great emancipator.

Abraham Lincoln Memorial Committee, Inc.

City of Milwaukee

January 31, 1932.

The pedestal's east face has four quotes by different individuals. These are:

- "One of Nature's Masterful Great Men" Richard Henry Stoddard
- "A Man Inspired of God" Henry Watterson
- "The Man of the People" Edwin Markham
- "The First American" James Russell Lowell.

== Historical information ==
Abraham Lincoln came to Milwaukee on September 30, 1859. He spoke at Wisconsin Agricultural Society, as well as to a group at the Newhall House. In 1916 the Lincoln Memorial Association, a group organized by Mayor Daniel Hoan, decided to commission a sculpture to commemorate the 60th anniversary of this event. A public subscription campaign raised $23,000 for the sculpture. This money was donated by schoolchildren, the business community, and members of the E.B Wolcott Post of the G.A.R.

Unfortunately, the sculpture was not able to be built right away as the United States became involved in World War I. In 1932 the Lincoln Memorial Association hosted a national competition for the Abraham Lincoln sculpture's design. Gaetano Cecere, a sculptor from New York City, won. He designed a sculpture that showed a young beardless Lincoln, standing up with his hands at his sides. The sculptor decided to portray the President without his famous beard because Lincoln did not grow a beard until he was 52. Pencil Points, an architecture magazine, asserted that Cecere's depiction of Lincoln represented one of the best of the hundreds that had been sculpted of the Emancipator." The red granite pedestal was designed by Ferdinand Eisman.

The sculpture's dedication ceremony took place on September 15, 1934.

=== Location history ===
The sculpture was originally placed on Lincoln Memorial Drive looking to the west. It was placed in storage in 1954 when the War Memorial Center construction began. It was subsequently placed in front of the Benevolent and Protective Order of Elks Club on East Wisconsin Avenue. It was once again placed on the Lincoln Memorial Drive bridge in 1986, with Lincoln's face directed towards the north within the War Memorial's plaza.

== Artist ==
Gaetano Cecere was born in New York City. He studied art at the National Academy of Art in New York and at the Beaux-Arts Institute in Paris. He was awarded the Prix de Rome in 1920, and became a Fellow of Sculpture at the American Academy in Rome from 1920–22. Afterwards Cecere moved back to New York and became a professor at Cooper Union. He was subsequently named Director of the Department of Sculpture.

In 1938 Cecere was named National Acdemician. He belonged to the National Academy of Design, the National Sculpture Society, and the New York Architectural League. Cecere's work reflected his interest in the beauty and simplicity of early Greek art. In addition to the Abraham Lincoln, he designed the U.S. Army's Soldier Medal for Valor for the United States Mint, as well as the Art in Trade Club Medal for the School of Art League of New York, the John F. Stevens Monument in Montana, and the Columbia Broadcasting Guest Award Medal.

== See also ==
- List of statues of Abraham Lincoln
- List of sculptures of presidents of the United States
