= Gaetano Cecere =

American sculptor

- Born: November 26, 1894; New York City, New York
- Died: June 10, 1985 (aged 90); Stamford, Connecticut
- Education: Beaux-Arts Institute of Design; National Academy of Design; American Academy in Rome
- Known for: Sculpture
- Movement: Neoclassicism
- Awards: Prix de Rome

Gaetano Cecere (November 26, 1894 – June 10, 1985) was an American sculptor. He was born, educated and worked in New York City. He studied with Hermon Atkins MacNeil and attended the Beaux-Arts Institute of Design and the National Academy of Design. In 1920, Cecere won the Prix de Rome and studied at the American Academy in Rome for several years. During this period a "tendency to simplify forms for decorative effects was developed." He was a member of the National Sculpture Society.

Cecere served as director of the Department of Sculpture at the Beaux-Arts Institute of Design in New York City. In 1940, he was selected to redecorate portions of the U.S. Capitol building's House of Representatives Chamber. Later in his career, Cecere taught art at Mary Washington College, Fredericksburg, Virginia.

Cecere sculpted the plaster model for the first version of the Distinguished Service Cross and later designed the Soldier's Medal.

== Selected works ==
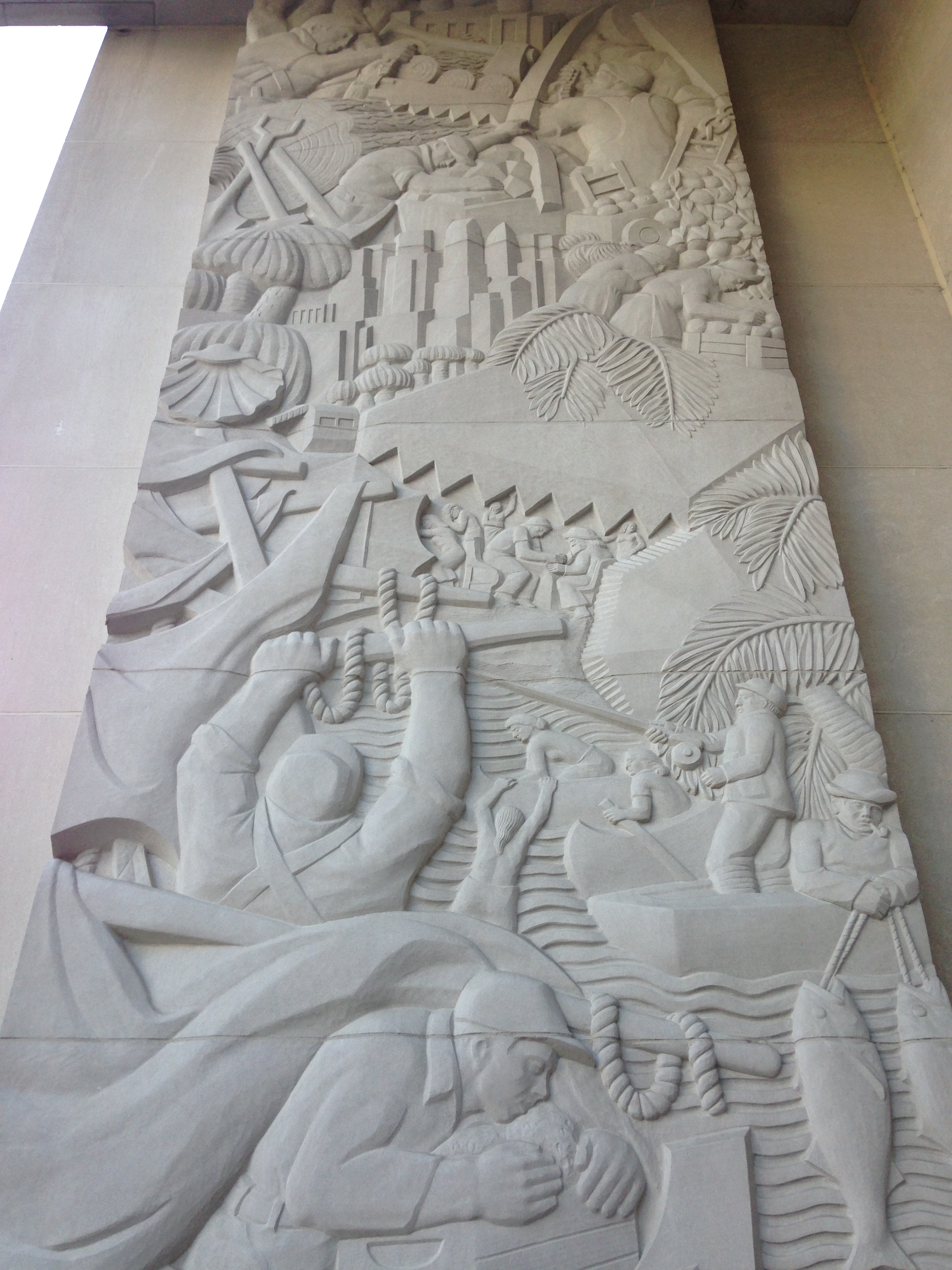
Relief entitled Commerce and Industry on the former Federal Reserve Bank building in Jacksonville, Florida

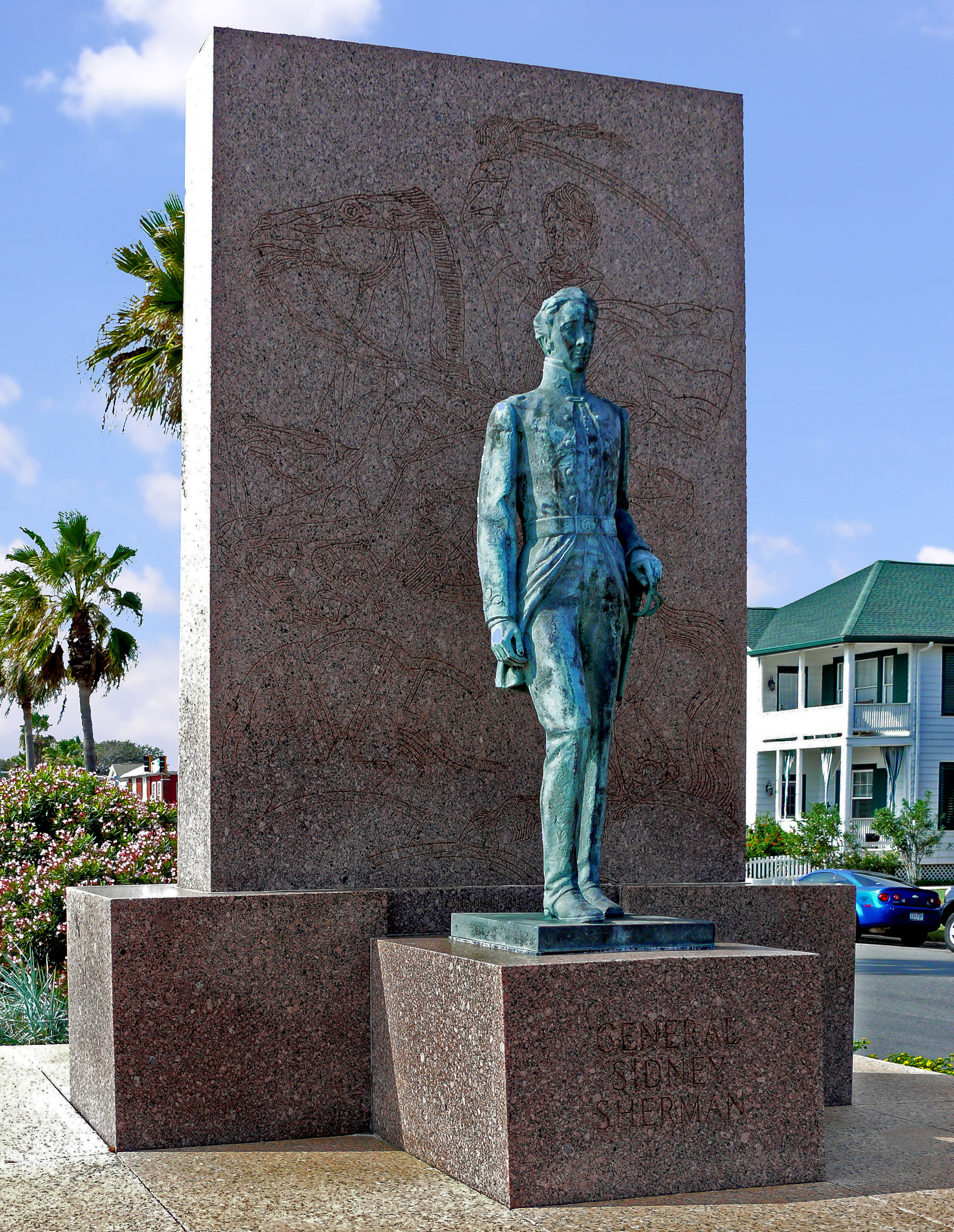
General Sidney Sherman Memorial on Broadway in Galveston

- Eighth issue of the Society of Medalists No Easy Way from Earth to Stars, 1933.
- Abraham Lincoln Memorial "larger than life" (10" 6") bronze statue, Milwaukee, Wisconsin, War Memorial Plaza, 1934
- 1939 New York World's Fair, two monumental statues representing American Manhood and American Womanhood 1939
- USPO, Great Neck, New York, Large carved in stone American Eagle,1940
- U.S. Capitol, United States House of Representatives Chambers and rotunda, bas relief portraits of famous lawmakers Alphonso X, "the Wise", George Mason, Simon de Montfort and Justinian, 1949-50
- Smithsonian Institution collection
- Metropolitan Museum of Art, New York
- Whitney Museum of American Art, New York
- Norfolk Museum of Art
- Brookgreen Gardens, published featured artist,1938
- National Collection of Fine Art, Smithsonian Institution
- Former Federal Reserve Bank of Atlanta Jacksonville Branch entryway reliefs, carved at Ingalls Stone Company in Bedford, IN in 1952
