= Herbert B. Hunter =

American architect

Herbert B. Hunter (October 5, 1890 – March 31, 1976) was an architect in North Carolina. Early in his career he worked as a draughtsman for Leonard L. Hunter. His principal North Carolina projects occurring in the 1920s. Hunter established his own firm in High Point, North Carolina in the early 1920s. He was an early member of the North Carolina Chapter of the American Institute of Architects and was pictured among the group at the annual meeting in Charlotte in 1929. He worked as an architect for the National Park Service designing park buildings. President Franklin D. Roosevelt selected him to make the drawing for the White House Oval Room. He served in the U.S. Navy during World War I and World War II, planning hospitals and other structures.

Hunter was born in Charlotte, North Carolina, attended Charlotte Military Academy and the Beaux Arts Architectural School in New York.

Hunter and his wife Johnsie had two children: Herbert Bernard Hunter, Jr. and Haynes N. Hunter. In 1965 Hunter retired to Asheville, North Carolina. He died in Hendersonville, North Carolina at the age 85.

== Career ==
His work includes Georgian Revival architecture and Colonial Revival architecture brick buildings adorned with Classical architecture detailing. He designed the original buildings of High Point College (now High Point University). He also designed buildings at Elon College (now Elon University) and at the Junior Order United American Mechanics National Orphans Home (1925-1932), which he modeled after the University of Virginia. Other examples of his work include the 12-story Hotel Kinston (1928) in Kinston, North Carolina. The hotel building blends Moorish architecture, Mission architecture and Art Deco architecture and is one of the only skyscrapers in eastern North Carolina. In Kinston he also designed a Tudor Revival architecture mansion: the Harvey C. Hines House (late 1920s). He also designed the First Reformed Church at Lexington, North Carolina (1927-1928). Hunter's obituary ran in the Asheville Citizen on April 2, 1976 and notes buildings at Mount Mitchell State Park, a residential project for James B. Duke, and houses in Blowing Rock, North Carolina and Charlotte.
