= Oswald Hoepfner =

American sculptor (1872–1957)

K. M. Oswald Hoepfner
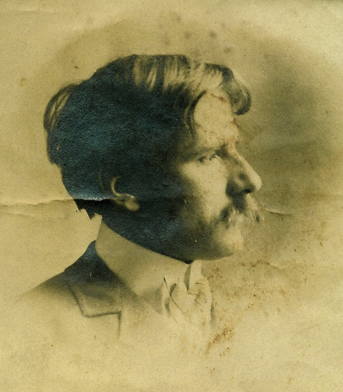
- Oswald Hoepfner c. 1900
- Born: January 7, 1872; Bromberg, Germany
- Died: June 15, 1957 (aged 85); New Jersey
- Education: Beaux Arts Institute of Design, National Sculpture Society, George Bridgman Institute
- Known for: Architectural sculpture
- Notable work: Bronze panels in the front doors of the Detroit Public Library, Main Branch

K. M. Oswald Hoepfner (January 7, 1872 – June 18, 1957) was an American sculptor noted for his work as an architectural sculptor.

== Early years ==
Hoepfner was born in Bromberg, Germany, now in Poland. Oswald received a violin at the age of nine. Before he left Germany he had handwritten thirty-five pages of violin compositions. He became interested in art early and at age 14 was apprenticed to a blacksmith. A year later he got a job in Riga, Latvia as a cabin boy and rigger aboard a sailing ship, the Trafalgar, and sailed to America. He arrived in Perth Amboy, New Jersey around 1888 and there jumped ship and began working at the Perth Amboy Terra Cotta Company.

Once in America, he performed on many stages, organized an orchestra and choir in the Perth Amboy area and continued his music studies at the New York College of Music.

Hoepfner studied at the Beaux Arts Institute of Design, NYC, where he subsequently became an instructor, as well as a member of the Jury of Award. He was acclaimed for his class titled "Architectural Ornament" and in 1925 was invited to become an honorary member of the Beaux-Arts Institute of Design.

Hoepfner also studied at the National Sculpture Society and George Bridgman Institute in New York City, where he was recognized for having achieved the status of anatomical perfection.

== Architectural sculpture ==
Hoepfner's accomplishments have been documented by his wife, Emma, nine children and twenty-five grandchildren.

He is recognized for his work on the bronze panels in the front doors of the Detroit Public Library, Main Branch. He is documented in the book Masterpieces of American Architecture, and for this work Oswald is listed in the Smithsonian Institution's Inventories of American Painting and Sculpture

Oswald is also recognized in the July 1921 issue of Architectural Forum magazine for his work on the niche in the Cunard Building, NYC.

Other of Oswald's architectural sculpture contributions to American buildings are found in Riverside Church, New York City; Radio City Music Hall, New York City; Liberty Memorial, Kansas City, Missouri, Philadelphia Public Ledger Building, Philadelphia, Pennsylvania; Philadelphia Public Library, Philadelphia; the James Scott Memorial Fountain, Detroit, Michigan; Lincoln Memorial, Germantown, Pennsylvania; and many more.

== Memberships ==
Oswald was an Honorary Member and Instructor at the Beaux Arts League; a member of the Art Students League; Honorary Member of the Architectural League, all in New York City; and member of the Turnverein Gymnastic Society, New Jersey.

== Associates ==
Oswald studied and worked with many of the well known architects and sculptors of his time. These include: John Donnelly Company, Perth Amboy Terra Cotta Company, Cass Gilbert, George Bridgman, Ulysses Ricci, Jeremiah Grandelis, Piccirilli Brothers, Edward Ardolino and many others. Among his students was Thomas Gaetano LoMedico.

== Personal life ==
Oswald lived with his wife and several children on their farm in New Jersey until his death on June 18, 1957.
