= Cesare Stea =

American sculptor

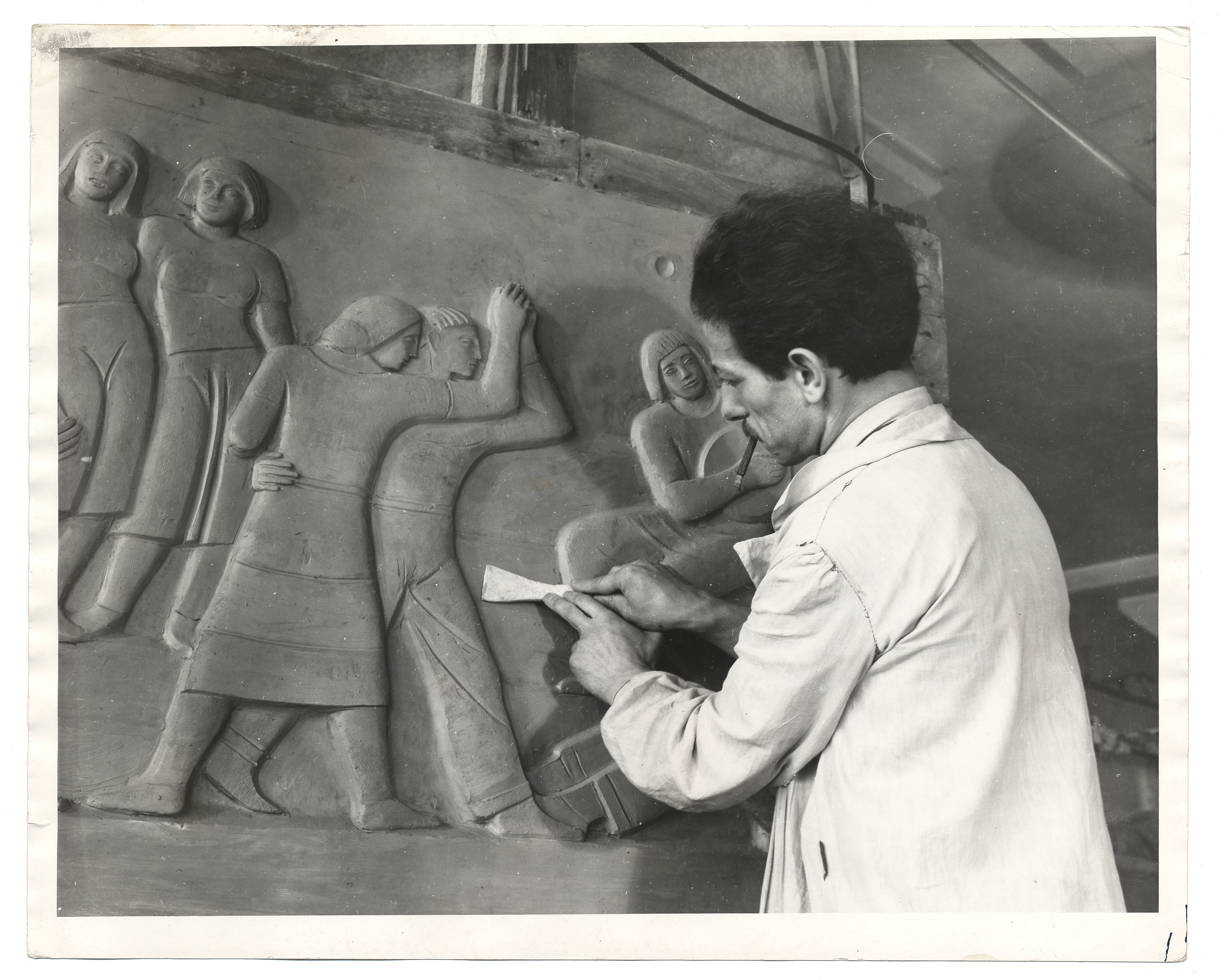
- Cesare Stea, from the Archives of American Art
- Born: 1893; Bari, Italy
- Died: 1960 (aged 66–67); New York City
- Education: Beaux-Arts Institute of Design, Académie de la Grande Chaumière
- Known for: Sculpture, muralist

Cesare Stea (August 17, 1893 – 1960) was an American sculptor and painter.

== Biography ==
Stea was born in Bari, Italy. He studied at the Beaux-Arts Institute of Design, National Academy of Design, Cooper Union and the Académie de la Grande Chaumière, where he studied with Antoine Bourdelle. He also studied with Hermon McNeil, Sterling Calder and Solon Borglum.

== Art career ==
He was a member of the Federal Art Project. He created relief sculptures, "Men and Machines" (1939) in Newcomerstown, Ohio, "Industry" (1941) in Wyomissing, Pennsylvania, in a relief at the Queensbridge Houses community center , and "Sculptural Relief" (1936) at Bowery Bay Sewage Disposal Plant. His work can also be found in Whitney Museum of American Art in New York and the Smithsonian Institution's National Portrait Gallery in Washington D.C.

Stea was a member of the National Sculpture Society.

His papers are held at the Archives of American Art.
