= VP-41 =

Patrol Squadron 41
- Active: 1 March 1944 – 23 April 1949
- Country: United States of America
- Branch: United States Navy
- Type: squadron
- Role: Maritime patrol
- Engagements: World War II

Aircraft flown
- Patrol: PBY-5 PBY-5A PBM-3D

VP-41 was a Patrol Squadron of the U.S. Navy. The squadron was established as Patrol Squadron 21 (VP-21) on 1 March 1944, redesignated Patrol Bombing Squadron 21 (VPB-21) on 1 October 1944, redesignated Patrol Squadron 21 (VP-21) on 15 May 1946, redesignated Medium Patrol Squadron (Seaplane) 11 (VP-MS-11) on 15 November 1946, redesignated Patrol Squadron 41 (VP-41) on 1 September 1948 and disestablished on 23 April 1949.

== Operational history ==
- 1 March 1944: VP-21 was established at NAS Norfolk, Virginia, as a seaplane squadron flying the PBM-3D Mariner. The next day, the squadron began relocating to NAS Harvey Point, North Carolina, where all of the ground and flight training was given. During this period, the squadron came under the operational control of FAW-5.
- 9 May 1944: VP-21 was relocated to NAS Key West, Florida, for advanced training in Anti-submarine warfare (ASW). The training was completed on 16 June 1944, and the squadron began to fly its aircraft cross-country to NAS Alameda, California, in preparation for its trans-Pacific flight to the South Pacific.
- 22 June 1944: The squadron aircraft began the trans-Pacific flight to NAS Kaneohe Bay, Hawaii, from NAS Alameda. Upon arrival, the squadron came under the operational control of FAW-2. The last element of three aircraft was aboard at NAS Kaneohe Bay by the 26th. Operational patrols and advanced combat training began immediately.
- 19 August 1944: VP-21 deployed to Parry Island Seaplane Base, Eniwetok, relieving VP-1. The squadron continued under the operational control of FAW-2, conducting patrols, searches, and the occasional bomb run over Japanese-held Ponape Island.
- 17 October 1944: VPB-21 was relocated to Kossol Passage, Palau. The squadron conducted daily searches, with tender support provided by USS Chandeleur and USS Mackinac. FAW-1 assumed operational control.
- 24 December 1944: The squadron was relocated to Ulithi Atoll to relieve VPB-17. Duties consisted of daytime anti-shipping patrols and hunter-killer missions. Tender support was provided by USS Chandeleur.
- 21 January 1945: During the night of the 21st Lieutenant(jg) Richard L. Simms and crew sank a Japanese Kaiten midget submarine attempting to attack shipping in Ulithi lagoon. The Kaiten had been released by the submarine carrier I-36. Simms and his crew dropped four Depth charges on the Kaiten, sinking it with the loss of its two-man crew.
- 29 January 1945: VPB-21 was relocated to Tanapag Harbor, Saipan, aboard USS Chandeleur, under the operational control of the 5th Fleet (TG 50.5.2). The squadron was assigned routine patrols in the vicinity of the island group. On 17 March the squadron was able to move ashore to the naval air base barracks, remaining until the 27th.
- 28 March 1945: The squadron was relocated to Kerama Retto to support the Battle of Okinawa. Tender support continued to be provided by USS Chandeleur. While stationed at this location, on 7 April 1945, one of the squadron aircraft spotted the Japanese battleship Yamato and her escorts steaming toward Okinawa. The aircrew was able to alert elements of the 5th Fleet and reinforcements soon arrived, resulting in the sinking of Yamato and several other Japanese vessels in the battle group. By the beginning of May, the squadron was advancing its patrols as far as the Ryukyu Islands, strafing and bombing targets of opportunity on land or sea. These were gradually extended to include the Japanese home islands, the East China Sea, the southern coast of Korea, and the China coast from north of Formosa to north of Shanghai. From 1 June 1945, the patrols were conducted to the south and east of Okinawa, the East China and Yellow Sea and the Sea of Japan. Dumbo (air-sea rescue) and weather flights were added to the squadron’s mission list.
- 15 July 1945: VPB-21 was relocated to Chimu-Wan, Okinawa. Daytime search and reconnaissance patrols were conducted through 6 August 1945, when the squadron was moved again to Eniwetok.
- 2 September – 18 November 1945: After a few weeks spent relocating and a brief period of stand down for rest and relaxation, the squadron commenced routine patrols from Eniwetok, remaining at that location until 11 September 1945, when it was relocated to Ominato, China. By 18 November 1945, VPB-21 had been relocated from Ominato to Hong Kong.
- 26 Jan 1946: The squadron moved its headquarters to the former Imperial Japanese Navy Air Base at Sasebo, Japan. Detachments were maintained at Hong Kong and Okinawa.
- 9 July – 3 October 1946: VPB-21 was relocated to Qingdao, China. Detachments were maintained at Hong Kong and Shanghai. On 3 October 1946, the Shanghai detachment was relocated to Yokosuka, Japan.
- 23 November 1947: The squadron was relocated to a new home port at NAS San Diego.
- 6 September 1948 – 26 March 1949: VP-41 deployed from its home port of NAS San Diego, to Qingdao, China, to relieve VP-MS-3. Ground personnel and supplies departed aboard USS Pine Island, and by 27 September all nine PBM-5 aircraft arrived at Qingdao. On the 29th a detachment of three aircraft was sent to Yokosuka, Japan. On 1 November 1948, five VP-41 aircraft flew to Buckner Bay, Okinawa, Japan, for ASW exercises, supported by USS Suisun. The exercise concluded due to a tropical storm front on the 9th. On 21 November 1948, the explosion of a Chinese Nationalist Army ammunition dump next to the seaplane ramp damaged two squadron aircraft. On 21 December 1948, a PBM-5 sank during a rough water landing off Qingdao; there were no casualties to the crew. The squadron returned to NAS San Diego on 26 March 1949.
- 23 April 1949: VP-41 was disestablished at NAS San Diego.

== Aircraft assignments ==
The squadron was assigned the following aircraft, effective on the dates shown: Flew PBY-5's and PBY-5A's from 1940-44

- PBM-3D - 2 March 1944

== Home port assignments ==
The squadron was assigned to these home ports, effective on the dates shown:

- NAS Norfolk, Virginia - 1 March 1944
- NAS Harvey Point, North Carolina - 2 March 1944
- NAS Key West, Florida - 9 May 1944
- NAS Kaneohe Bay, Hawaii - 22 June 1944
- NAS San Diego, California - 23 November 1947

== See also ==
- Maritime patrol aircraft
- List of inactive United States Navy aircraft squadrons
- List of United States Navy aircraft squadrons
- List of squadrons in the Dictionary of American Naval Aviation Squadrons
- History of the United States Navy
