= David K. Rubins =

American sculptor (1902–1985)

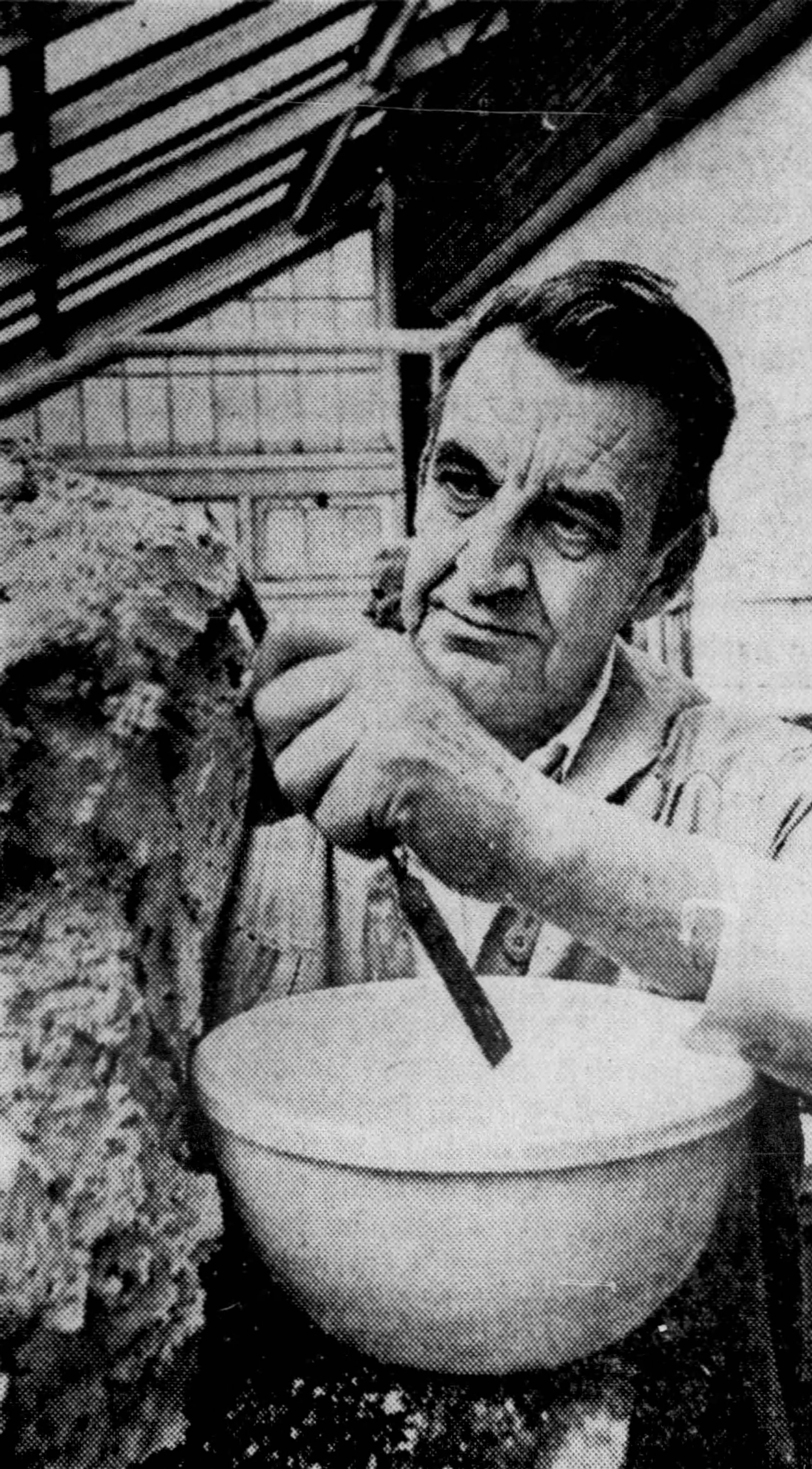
- Rubins in 1966
- Born: 1902; Minneapolis, Minnesota
- Died: 1985 (aged 82–83); New York City
- Burial place: Crown Hill Cemetery, Section 41A, Lot Anatomical, Indianapolis, indiana 39.8213946°N 86.1641283°W
- Occupations: Sculptor, professor

David Kresz Rubins (1902–1985) was an American sculptor and professor. He taught at Herron School of Art in Indianapolis and his various works adorn the Indiana State House, the American Museum of Natural History in New York, and the National Archives building in Washington, D.C.

== Biography ==
=== Personal life ===
David Kresz Rubins was born in Minneapolis in 1902. As a young man, he was apprenticed to James Earle Fraser before moving on to study at Dartmouth College and the Beaux-Arts Institute of Design in New York. He then traveled to Europe to study in Paris, where he was awarded the Paris Prize in Sculpture. He was a fellow of the American Academy in Rome from 1928 to 1931. Rubins had two sons, James A. Rubins and Harry Rubins. A left-wing Democrat, he was a member of the John Reed Club and he once tried to create a teachers' union. In Rubins' later years, illness made it difficult for him to continue to work in his studio, though he still made daily trips to the Herron School. He died in New York City on Wednesday, March 6, 1985, at the age of 82. Soon after his death, donors began sending in checks to be used for a scholarship fund in his name.

=== Academic career ===
He joined the faculty of the Herron School of Art in Indianapolis in 1935. While there, he taught drawing, anatomy, ceramics, and sculpture and he was director of the sculpture program for 45 years. In 1943 he served on a jury judging an Indiana state competition wherein high school students designed posters to aid in the control of cancer During his time as an academic in 1953, he authored a textbook, The Human Figure: An Anatomy for Artists, which became a standard text for art students. The text was also published in Germany After retiring as director of the sculpture program, he continued to work with the Herron School of Art as Sculptor in Residence at Indiana University-Purdue University Indianapolis.

== Published works ==
1953 – The Human Figure: An Anatomy for Artists. Rubins wrote it because it was much needed in the field. It was and is still used as a text book in many schools. Rubins used Gray's Anatomy to reference the scientific names of muscles/anatomy.

== Work ==
I was brought up and taught in the "old world" tradition – and so it's difficult for me to change and be a part of this new world. I have to walk in the shoes to which I am accustomed.

— David K. Rubins

=== Sculptures ===
Distribution of the Mail (1939), limestone relief in duplicate at the Birch Bayh Federal Building and United States Courthouse in Indianapolis

Rubins worked primarily as a sculptor, and sculpture was the major thrust of his early apprenticeship under sculptor James Earle Fraser and his studies in Paris and Rome. Rubins apprenticed to Fraser for seven years and during his apprenticeship he created the drapery on Fraser's equestrian statue of Teddy Roosevelt at the American Museum of Natural History in New York City. He also collaborated with Fraser on sculptures outside the United States Supreme Court Building and the National Archives building, including the piece "Figure On Steps".

He continued his work as a sculptor during his tenure at the Herron Art Institute and later Indiana University-Purdue University Indianapolis. In 1944, his plaster bust Portrait of Evans Woolens was featured in the 37th Annual Exhibition of Works by Indiana Artists. He subsequently gave it to the Indianapolis Museum of Art. In 1962, he created the statue of Young Abe Lincoln which adorns the lawns at the Indiana State House. In 1964, he created the bust of former governor Henry F. Schricker which resides in an alcove inside the Indiana State House. During the 1960s he also created the sculpture Stumbling Man for a state-sponsored competition to honor the memory of Indiana coal miners. In 1979 it came to the Indianapolis Museum of Art and it was formally dedicated there in 1981.

Other examples of Rubins' sculpture include the cherub that would adorn the downtown Indianapolis L. S. Ayres building during the Christmas season (now located in the Indiana State Museum), the Lilly Monument at Crown Hill Cemetery in Indianapolis, a number of commemorative plaques at Riley Hospital, a sculpture of Dr. Hahn that resides at the Evansville Museum of Arts, History and Science, a bronze figure of a nude woman given to the IMA, a marble female figure also housed at the IMA, a bust of Dean John Van Nuys at the IU School of Medicine, a commissioned plaque of Wilbur Peat for the IMA, and the ornamental sculptures over the driveway entrances of the Birch Bayh Federal Building and United States Courthouse. His work has been shown at the Minneapolis Institute of Art, the Metropolitan Museum of Art by invitation, and the National Academy of Design and Architectural League.

=== Prints ===
Rubins also worked in two-dimensional art. In addition to his textbook on human anatomy, he created a poster interpreting the theme "The People Are On the March" for a national war poster competition during World War II and has two untitled prints at the Smithsonian American Art Museum.

== Awards ==
In 1924, Rubins was awarded the Paris Prize in Sculpture. In 1928, he was awarded the Prix de Rome. In 1943, his war poster won honorable mention in national competition. He was also awarded the Grant and Sculpture Award from the National Institute of Arts and Letters. In 1973, the alumni of Herron School of Art honored him with "David K. Rubins Day," including a dinner party and the announcement of two scholarships in his name. The alumni honored him again in 1978 with a special exhibition of his work. In 1983 he was one of six winners of the Indiana Arts Award given by the Indiana Arts Commission and the Indiana Advocates for the Arts.

== See also ==
- Bust of Henry F. Schricker
- Herron School of Art and Design
- Stumbling Man
- Young Abe Lincoln
