= Beaux-Arts Institute of Design =

Former art and architectural school in Manhattan, New York

Coordinates: 40.75068°N 73.97081°W

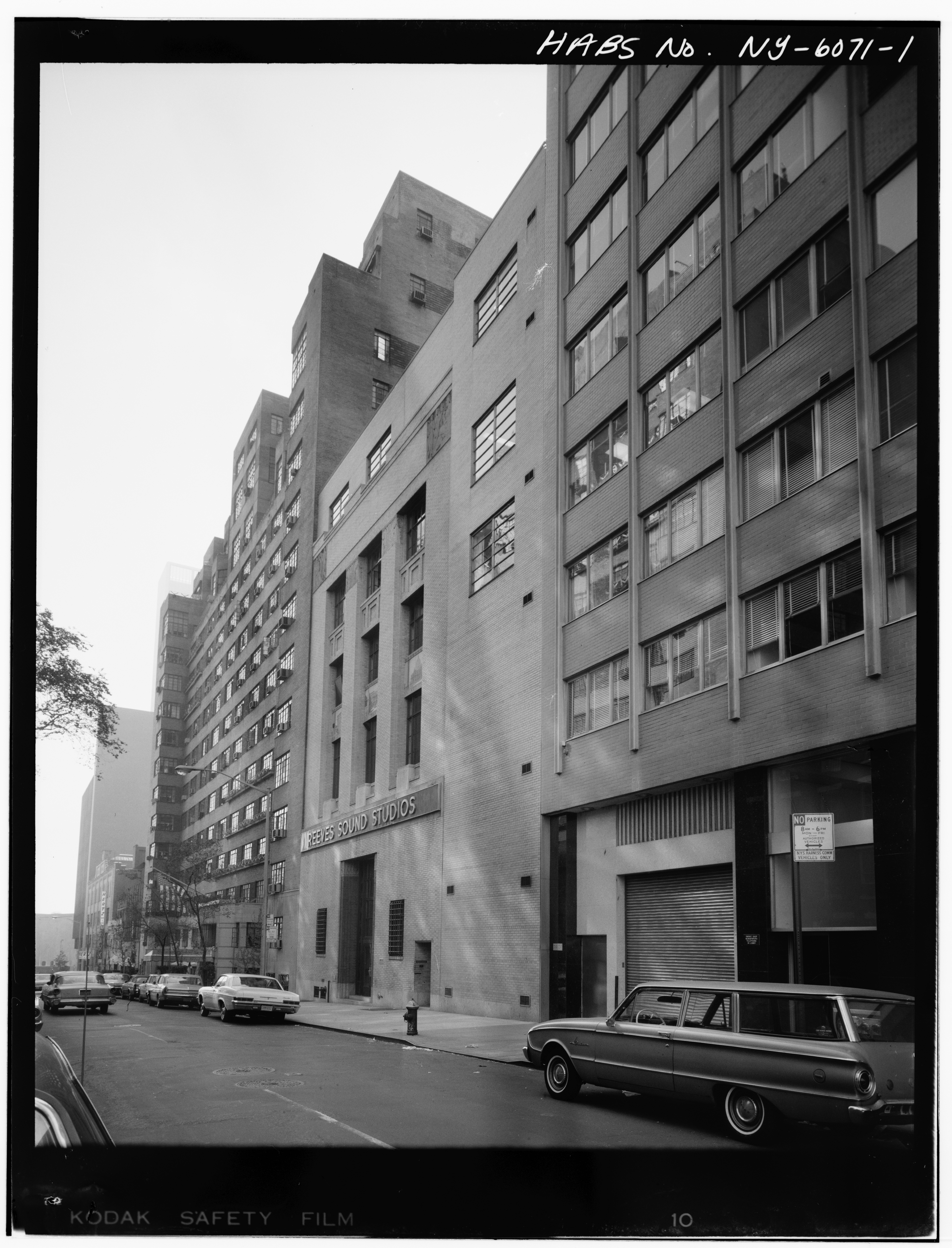
304 East 44th Street

The Beaux-Arts Institute of Design (BAID, later the National Institute for Architectural Education) was an art and architectural school at 304 East 44th Street in Turtle Bay, Manhattan, in New York City. It was founded in 1916 by Lloyd Warren for the training of American architects, sculptors and mural painters consistent with the educational agenda of the French École des Beaux-Arts. The building is now home to Egypt's mission to the United Nations.

== Origins ==
BAID grew out of the Society of Beaux-Arts Architects, a formal club of American architects who had attended the Parisian school.

From its beginning in 1894, the Society of Beaux-Arts Architects had been interested in improving architectural education in the U.S.. It took on the task of developing standard architectural "programmes" for design problems to be given as assignments in architecture schools and in independent ateliers. The intent was to raise performance standards, but the effect also was to standardize the way architecture was taught all across the United States. By 1900, most American architecture schools and many independent ateliers were participating. By 1916 the burden of providing problem statements and jurying the work from an increasing number of schools and ateliers exceeded the capacity of the Society, so it established BAID to carry on this work.

Among sculpture professionals, the foundation of BAID ensured a supply of competent decorative sculptors, and allowed the members of the National Sculpture Society to position themselves as fine artists in comparison.

== History ==
The National Sculpture Society deeded over a building at 126 East 75th Street to the newly created BAID. Courses began on September 18, 1916 in three departments. The architecture department was associated with a committee from the Society; the sculpture department with a committee from the National Sculpture Society; and the mural department with a committee from the Society of Mural Painters.

Architect Frederic Charles Hirons of Dennison & Hirons was central to the founding and running of the school. Hirons had attended the Paris school from 1904 through 1909; co-founded BAID in 1916; designed the BAID building in 1928 (won through a competition, in the manner of Beaux-Arts); and served as president of the Society of Beaux-Arts Architects from 1937 through 1939.

Another founder was Lloyd Warren, the brother of Whitney Warren of Warren and Wetmore. He was instrumental in getting top figures from the sculptural and architectural fields to teach at BAID, and serve on competition panels, for the sake of the profession.

In 1927 the first winner of the annual Whitney Warren architectural competition was Carl Conrad Franz Kressbach, a student at the Graduate School of Architecture at Harvard University (graduate of University of Michigan). His design "An airport for a large city" drew interest among persons concerned with the future of commercial aviation, it depicted a scheme for dispatching and receiving commercial planes.

In 1956 the Institute changed its name to the National Institute for Architectural Education, reflecting a change of focus away from European traditions. In 1995 it was again renamed the Van Alen Institute.

== Activities ==
BAID architectural competitions were published across the country, administered through university architecture schools or independent studios, and the entries all graded by jury at once. The highest number of entries received was in the 1929–1930 year, when 9500 entries came into New York City for judging.

BAID also had on-site instruction and classrooms, with large sculpture studios open long hours and into the evenings for the convenience of working students and part-time teachers.

The school tended to be populated by students who were either immigrants or first-generation Americans. They often came from working-class backgrounds, and their training was towards getting a union job in the building trades, rather than becoming a fine arts sculptor. Many of these students also attended the Art Students League of New York.

== Notable alumni ==
- Edmond Romulus Amateis, sculptor, entered BAID in 1915
- Beniamino Benvenuto Bufano
- Gaetano Cecere, sculptor
- Rose Connor, architect in Pasadena, California
- Herbert Ferber, sculptor, attended circa 1926
- Mitchell Fields, sculptor, attended BAID from 1917 to 1927
- Harold H. Fisher, church architect
- Paul Fjelde, sculptor, professor at Pratt Institute
- Vincent Glinsky, sculptor; student (1916–1920) and instructor (1931–32; 1940–41)
- Chaim Gross, sculptor, attended circa 1922
- Stratton Hammon, Colonial Revival domestic architect, Louisville, Kentucky
- Milton Hebald, sculptor
- Henry Hensche, painter
- Oswald Hoepfner, student and instructor c. 1920-1926
- Herbert B. Hunter, architect.
- Joseph Kiselewski, sculptor
- Ibram Lassaw, sculptor, attended circa 1928
- Ellamae Ellis League, architect from Macon, Georgia, first woman FAIA from Georgia
- John Gaw Meem, architect, Atelier Denver
- Arthur C. Morgan, sculptor of mostly Louisiana political and business figures
- Jules Olitski, painter, attended BAID from 1940 to 1942
- Corrado Parducci, sculptor
- David K. Rubins, sculptor
- Louis Slobodkin, sculptor and children's book author
- Cesare Stea, sculptor
- Albert Stewart, sculptor
- Robert Edward Weaver, muralist, painter, sculptor, BAID medalist 1935-1936 for mural design
- Albert W. Wein, sculptor, attended 1932
- Paul R. Williams, architect, Atelier near Los Angeles

== See also ==
- National Register of Historic Places listings in Manhattan from 14th to 59th Streets
- List of New York City Designated Landmarks in Manhattan from 14th to 59th Streets
