= List of United States Air National Guard squadrons =

The list of Air National Guard squadrons is sorted by squadron number with unit emblem, location, command, and aircraft type. Flying squadrons means that they are currently flying or were flying in their past. The other squadrons are not flying, with future status unknown.

== Flying squadrons ==
Squadron	Shield	Location	MAJCOM	Aircraft
100th Fighter Squadron		Montgomery Air National Guard Base, Alabama	ACC	F-16C/D; slated for transition to the F-35A.
101st Intelligence Squadron		Otis Air National Guard Base, Massachusetts	ACC	DCGS / Flying mission terminated due to BRAC; former F-15C/D fighter squadron.
101st Rescue Squadron		Francis S. Gabreski Air National Guard Base, New York	ACC	HH-60G, HH-60W
102nd Rescue Squadron		Francis S. Gabreski Air National Guard Base, New York	ACC	HC-130J
103rd Rescue Squadron		Francis S. Gabreski Air National Guard Base, New York	ACC	Aircrew personnel, but no assigned aircraft. / Combat Rescue Officer (CRO) and enlisted Pararescueman (PJ) squadron; utilizes HH-60G aircraft of the 101 RQS and HC-130J aircraft of the 102 RQS.
103rd Attack Squadron		Naval Air Station Joint Reserve Base Willow Grove, Pennsylvania	ACC	MQ-9
104th Fighter Squadron		Martin State Airport / Warfield Air National Guard Base, Maryland	ACC	A-10C
105th Airlift Squadron		Nashville International Airport / Berry Field Air National Guard Base, Tennessee	AMC	MQ-9 / Crewed flying mission terminated due to BRAC with squadron redesignation pending; former C-130H airlift squadron.
106th Air Refueling Squadron		Birmingham Air National Guard Base, Alabama	AMC	KC-135R
107th Fighter Squadron		Selfridge Air National Guard Base, Michigan	ACC	A-10C, slated to be replaced by the F-15EX
108th Air Refueling Squadron		Scott Air Force Base, Illinois	AMC	KC-135R
109th Airlift Squadron		Minneapolis-St. Paul Air Reserve Station, Minnesota	AMC	C-130H
110th Bomb Squadron		Whiteman Air Force Base, Missouri	AFGSC	B-2A
111th Attack Squadron		Ellington Field Joint Reserve Base, Texas	ACC	MQ-9
112th Fighter Squadron		Toledo Air National Guard Base, Ohio	ACC	F-16C/D
113th Air Support Operations Squadron		Hulman Field Air National Guard Base, Indiana	ACC	ASOS and DCGS / Flying mission terminnated due to BRAC; former F-16C/D fighter squadron.
114th Fighter Squadron		Kingsley Field Air National Guard Base, Oregon	ACC	F-15C/D, slated to transition to the F-35A. The last F-15 departed in December 2025 with F-35s expected to arrive in 2027.
115th Airlift Squadron		Channel Islands Air National Guard Station, California	AMC	C-130J
116th Air Refueling Squadron		Fairchild Air Force Base, Washington	AMC	KC-135R
117th Air Refueling Squadron		Forbes Field Air National Guard Base, Kansas	AMC	KC-135R
118th Airlift Squadron		Bradley Air National Guard Base, Connecticut	AMC	C-130H
119th Fighter Squadron		Atlantic City Air National Guard Base, New Jersey	ACC	F-16C/D
120th Fighter Squadron		Buckley Space Force Base, Colorado	ACC	F-16C/D
121st Fighter Squadron		Joint Base Andrews, Maryland	ACC	F-16C/D
122nd Fighter Squadron		Naval Air Station Joint Reserve Base New Orleans, Louisiana	ACC	F-15C/D, slated to transition to the F-15EX
123rd Fighter Squadron		Portland Air National Guard Base, Oregon	ACC	F-15C/D & F-15EX. The 123 FS is the first ANG flying squadron to operate the F-15EX
124th Attack Squadron		Des Moines International Airport, Iowa	ACC	MQ-9 / Crewed flying mission terminated due to Base Realignment and Closure; former F-16C/D fighter squadron.
125th Fighter Squadron		Tulsa Air National Guard Base, Oklahoma	ACC	F-16C/D
126th Air Refueling Squadron		General Mitchell Air National Guard Base, Wisconsin	AMC	KC-135R
127th Command and Control Squadron		McConnell Air Force Base, Kansas	ACC	INACTIVE / Flying mission terminated due to BRAC; former B-1B bomb squadron. Non-flying mission terminated and squadron inactivated effective Sep 2014 due to USAF budget reductions imposed by sequestration.
128th Airborne Command and Control Squadron		Robins Air Force Base, Georgia	ACC	E-8C
129th Rescue Squadron		Moffett Federal Airfield, California	ACC	HH-60G
130th Airlift Squadron		Yeager Airport / McLaughlin Air National Guard Base, West Virginia	AMC	C-130H
130th Rescue Squadron		Moffett Federal Airfield, California	ACC	MC-130P
131st Fighter Squadron		Barnes Air National Guard Base, Massachusetts	ACC	F-15C/D slated to transition to F-35A
131st Rescue Squadron		Moffett Federal Airfield, California	ACC	Aircrew personnel, but no assigned aircraft. Combat Rescue Officer (CRO) and enlisted Pararescueman (PJ) squadron; utilizes HH-60G aircraft of the 129 RQS and MC-130P aircraft of the 130 RQS.
132nd Air Refueling Squadron		Bangor Air National Guard Base, Maine	AMC	KC-135R
133rd Air Refueling Squadron		Pease Air National Guard Base, New Hampshire	AMC	KC-135R; slated for transition to KC-46A
134th Fighter Squadron		Burlington Air National Guard Base, Vermont	ACC	F-35A.
135th Intelligence Squadron		Martin State Airport / Warfield Air National Guard Base, Maryland	AMC	DCGS / Flying mission terminated due to BRAC; former C-130J airlift squadron.
136th Air Squadron		Niagara Falls Joint Air Reserve Station, New York	ACC	MQ-9 / Crewed flying mission terminated effective Dec 2015 due to USAF budget reductions imposed by sequestration; former C-130H "associate" airlift squadron to Air Force Reserve Command's 914th Airlift Wing.
137th Airlift Squadron		Stewart Air National Guard Base, New York	AMC	C-17A
138th Attack Squadron		Syracuse Hancock International Airport / Hancock Field Air National Guard Base, New York	ACC	MQ-9 / Crewed flying mission terminated due to BRAC; former F-16C/D fighter squadron.
139th Airlift Squadron		Schenectady County Airport / Stratton Air National Guard Base, New York	AMC	LC-130H, C-130H
141st Air Refueling Squadron		Joint Base McGuire-Dix-Lakehurst, New Jersey	AMC	KC-135R
142nd Airlift Squadron		New Castle Air National Guard Base, Delaware	AMC	C-130H
143rd Airlift Squadron		Quonset Air National Guard Base, Rhode Island	AMC	C-130J
144th Airlift Squadron		Joint Base Elmendorf–Richardson, Alaska	PACAF	C-17A
145th Air Refueling Squadron		Rickenbacker Air National Guard Base, Ohio	AMC	KC-135R
146th Air Refueling Squadron		Pittsburgh Air Reserve Station, Pennsylvania	AMC	KC-135T
147th Air Refueling Squadron		Pittsburgh Air Reserve Station, Pennsylvania	AMC	KC-135T
179th Fighter Squadron		Duluth Air National Guard Base, Minnesota	ACC	F-16C/D
148th Fighter Squadron		Tucson Air National Guard Base, Arizona	AETC	F-16A/AM/B/BM/C/D/E/F / NATO/Allied/Coalition F-16 training in support of F-16 Foreign Military Sales (FMS) programs.
149th Fighter Squadron		Langley Air Force Base, Virginia	ACC	F-22A
150th Special Operations Squadron		Joint Base McGuire-Dix-Lakehurst, New Jersey	AFSOC	Boeing C-32B
151st Air Refueling Squadron		McGhee Tyson Air National Guard Base, Tennessee	AMC	KC-135R
152nd Fighter Squadron		Tucson Air National Guard Base, Arizona	AETC	F-16C/D / NATO/Allied/Coalition F-16 training in support of F-16 Foreign Military Sales (FMS) programs.
153rd Air Refueling Squadron		Key Field Air National Guard Base, Mississippi	AMC	KC-135R
154th Training Squadron		Little Rock Air Force Base, Arkansas	AETC	C-130H
155th Airlift Squadron		Memphis Air National Guard Base, Tennessee	AMC	C-17A
156th Airlift Squadron		Charlotte Air National Guard Base, North Carolina	AMC	C-17A (Transitioned from C-130H in 2018)
157th Fighter Squadron		McEntire Joint National Guard Base, South Carolina	ACC	F-16CM/DM
159th Fighter Squadron		Jacksonville Air National Guard Base, Florida	ACC	F-15C/D
160th Fighter Squadron		Montgomery Air National Guard Base, Alabama	ACC	INACTIVE / F-16C/D fighter squadron; redesignated as the 100th Fighter Squadron.
161st Intelligence Squadron		McConnell Air Force Base, Kansas	ACC	DCGS (flying mission terminated due to BRAC; former F-16C/D fighter squadron)
162nd Reconnaissance Squadron		Springfield Air National Guard Base, Ohio	ACC	MQ-1 / Crewed flying mission terminated due to BRAC; former F-16C/D fighter squadron.
163rd Fighter Squadron		Fort Wayne Air National Guard Base, Indiana	ACC	A-10C
164th Airlift Squadron		Mansfield Lahm Air National Guard Base, Ohio	AMC	C-130H
165th Airlift Squadron		Savannah Air National Guard Base, Georgia	AMC	C-130J
166th Air Refueling Squadron		Rickenbacker Air National Guard Base, Ohio	AMC	KC-135R
167th Airlift Squadron		Shepherd Field Air National Guard Base, West Virginia	AMC	C-17A
168th Air Refueling Squadron		Eielson Air Force Base, Alaska	PACAF	KC-135R
169th Airlift Squadron		Peoria Air National Guard Base, Illinois	AMC	C-130H
170th Fighter Squadron		Capital Airport Air National Guard Station, Illinois	ACC	INACTIVE / Flying mission terminated due to BRAC; former F-16C/D fighter squadron.
171st Air Refueling Squadron		Selfridge Air National Guard Base, Michigan	AMC	KC-135T
172d Attack Squadron		Battle Creek Air National Guard Base, Michigan	ACC	MQ-9 / Fighter/attack flying mission terminated in 2009 due to BRAC and transferred to 107th Fighter Squadron; former A-10A fighter squadron. Crewed flying mission terminated in 2013 due to USAF budget reductions imposed by sequestration; former C-21A airlift squadron.
173rd Air Refueling Squadron		Lincoln Air National Guard Base, Nebraska	AMC	KC-135R
174th Air Refueling Squadron		Sioux City Air National Guard Base, Iowa	AMC	KC-135R
175th Fighter Squadron		Sioux Falls Regional Airport / Joe Foss Field Air National Guard Station, South Dakota	ACC	F-16C/D
176th Fighter Squadron		Dane County Regional Airport / Truax Field Air National Guard Base, Wisconsin	ACC	F-16C/D; slated for transition to the F-35A.
177th Information Warfare Aggressor Squadron		McConnell Air Force Base, Kansas	ACC	Non-flying information warfare squadron / Flying mission terminated due to BRAC; former F-16C/D fighter squadron.
178th Reconnaissance Squadron		Hector International Airport / Fargo Air National Guard Base, North Dakota	ACC	MQ-1A / Crewed flying mission terminated due to BRAC; former F-16A/B (ADF) fighter squadron.
180th Airlift Squadron		Rosecrans Air National Guard Base, Missouri	AMC	C-130H
181st Airlift Squadron		Naval Air Station Joint Reserve Base Fort Worth, Texas	AMC	C-130H
182nd Fighter Squadron		Lackland Air Force Base / Kelly Field Annex, Texas	AETC	F-16C/D
183rd Airlift Squadron		Allen C. Thompson Field Air National Guard Base, Mississippi	AMC	C-17A
184th Attack Squadron		Fort Smith Regional Airport / Ebbing Air National Guard Base, Arkansas	ACC	MQ-9 Reaper / Prior crewed flying mission (1st iteration) terminated in 2007 due to BRAC; former F-16C/D fighter squadron; latest crewed flying mission (2nd iteration) terminated in 2014 pursuant to 2013 NDAA; former A-10C fighter squadron; Loss of A-10s part of a since discontinued USAF effort to retire all A-10 aircraft from USAF, AFRC and ANG inventories and shift funding to the F-35A due to sequestration-imposed pressures on USAF budget.
185th Special Operations Squadron		Will Rogers Air National Guard Base, Oklahoma	AFSOC	MC-12W
186th Airlift Squadron		Great Falls Air National Guard Base, Montana	AMC	C-130H / Fighter mission terminated in 2014 due to USAF 2010 Force Structure Change; former F-15C/D fighter squadron. Realigned as a C-130 airlift squadron with F-15 aircraft reassigned to the California Air National Guard.
187th Airlift Squadron		Cheyenne Regional Airport / Cheyenne Air National Guard Base, Wyoming	AMC	C-130H
188th Rescue Squadron		Kirtland Air Force Base, New Mexico	AETC	HC-130P, HH-60G, CV-22B
189th Airlift Squadron		Boise Airport / Gowen Field Air National Guard Base, Idaho	AMC	INACTIVE / Flying mission terminated due to BRAC; former C-130H airlift squadron
190th Fighter Squadron		Boise Airport / Gowen Field Air National Guard Base, Idaho	ACC	A-10C, slated to transition to the F-16
191st Air Refueling Squadron		Salt Lake City International Airport / Salt Lake City Air National Guard Base, Utah	AMC	KC-135R
192nd Airlift Squadron		Reno Air National Guard Base, Nevada	AMC	C-130H
193rd Special Operations Squadron		Harrisburg Air National Guard Base, Pennsylvania	AFSOC	EC-130J
194th Fighter Squadron		Fresno Air National Guard Base, California	ACC	F-15 C/D, slated to transition to the F-15EX
195th Fighter Squadron		Tucson Air National Guard Base, Arizona	AETC	F-16C/D
196th Attack Squadron		March Air Reserve Base, California	ACC	MQ-1A / Crewed flying mission terminated due to BRAC; former KC-135R air refueling squadron.
197th Air Refueling Squadron		Goldwater Air National Guard Base, Arizona	AMC	KC-135R
198th Airlift Squadron		Muñiz Air National Guard Base, Puerto Rico	AMC	C-130H
199th Fighter Squadron		Joint Base Pearl Harbor–Hickam, Hawaii	PACAF	F-22A
200th Airlift Squadron		Buckley Space Force Base, Colorado	AMC	Inactive. Formerly operated the C-21A
201st Airlift Squadron		Joint Base Andrews, Maryland	AMC	C-40B, C-38A
203rd Air Refueling Squadron		Joint Base Pearl Harbor–Hickam, Hawaii	PACAF	KC-135R
204th Airlift Squadron		Joint Base Pearl Harbor–Hickam, Hawaii	PACAF	C-17A
210th Rescue Squadron		Joint Base Elmendorf–Richardson, Alaska	PACAF	HH-60G
211th Rescue Squadron		Joint Base Elmendorf–Richardson, Alaska	PACAF	HC-130P, transitioning to HC-130J
212th Rescue Squadron		Joint Base Elmendorf–Richardson, Alaska	PACAF	Aircrew personnel, but no assigned aircraft. / Combat Rescue Officer (CRO) and enlisted Pararescueman (PJ) squadron; utilizes HH-60G aircraft of the 210 RQS and HC-130P aircraft of the 211 RQS.
214th Reconnaissance Squadron		Davis–Monthan Air Force Base, Arizona	ACC	MQ-1B / Established in 2007 as a Remotely Piloted Aircraft (RPA, e.g., uncrewed) flying squadron.
144th Airlift Squadron		Joint Base Elmendorf–Richardson, Alaska		C-17A

== Non-flying squadrons ==
Certain non-flying ANG squadrons in the previous list were formerly flying squadrons prior to BRAC-directed force reductions in the 1990s and 2000s and/or USAF budget-driven force reductions imposed by sequestration in 2013 and subsequent.

- 111th Space Operations Squadron
- 112th Air Operations Squadron
- 114th Space Control Squadron
- 116th Air Control Squadron
- 117th Air Control Squadron
- 117th Intelligence Squadron
- 119th Command and Control Squadron
- 123rd Intelligence Squadron
- 125th Special Tactics Squadron
- 130th Engineering Installation Squadron
- 137th Space Warning Squadron
- 140th Air Defense Squadron
- 141st Air Control Squadron
- 148th Space Operations Squadron
- 152nd Intelligence Squadron
- 152nd Combat Operations Squadron
- 153rd Command and Control Squadron
- 176th Air Control Squadron
- 192d Intelligence Squadron
- 194th Intelligence Squadron
- 202nd Engineering Installation Squadron
- 205th Engineering Installation Squadron
- 210th Engineering Installation Squadron
- 211th Engineering Installation Squadron
- 212th Engineering Installation Squadron
- 213th Engineering Installation Squadron
- 213th Space Warning Squadron
- 214th Engineering Installation Squadron
- 215th Engineering Installation Squadron
- 216th Engineering Installation Squadron
- 217th Engineering Installation Squadron
- 218th Engineering Installation Squadron
- 219th Engineering Installation Squadron
- 220th Engineering Installation Squadron
- 234th Intelligence Squadron
- 241st Engineering Installation Squadron
- 241st Air Traffic Control Squadron
- 243rd Air Traffic Control Squadron (USAF)
- 243d Engineering Installation Squadron
- 245th Air Traffic Control Squadron
- 259th Air Traffic Control Squadron
- 263d Combat Communications Squadron
- 267th Combat Communications Squadron
- 270th Air Traffic Control Squadron
- 272nd Combat Communications Squadron
- 273rd Engineering Installation Squadron
- 282nd Combat Communications Squadron
- 290th Joint Communications Support Squadron
