= 249th Airlift Squadron =

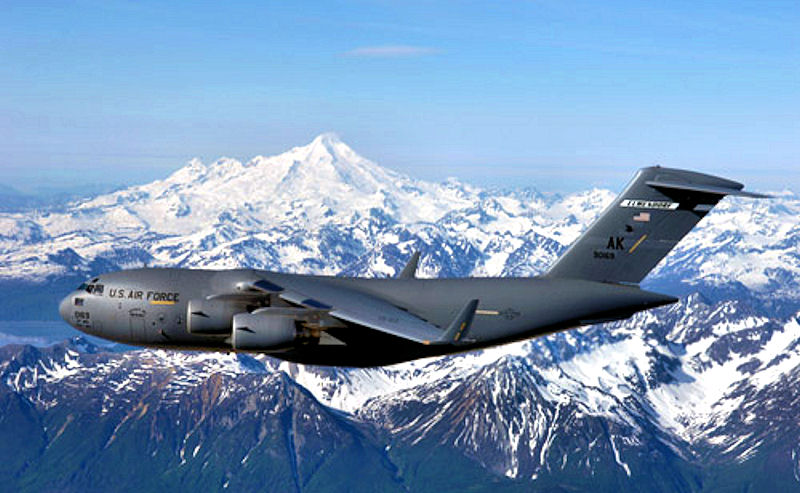
- 249th Airlift Squadron C-17 Globemaster III (Note: Aircraft is C-17A Lot XI, serial 99-169 "Spirit of Denali". This was the first Globemaster III delivered to Elmendorf Air Force Base.)
- Active: 2009–2018
- Country: United States
- Allegiance: Alaska
- Branch: Air National Guard
- Role: Airlift
- Part of: Alaska Air National Guard
- Garrison/HQ: Joint Base Elmendorf–Richardson, Anchorage, Alaska
- Tail Code: White tail stripe "Elmendorf" in black "AK"

Insignia
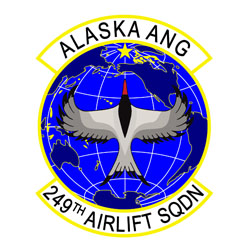
- 249th Airlift Squadron emblem

The 249th Airlift Squadron is an inactive unit of the Alaska Air National Guard, formerly located at Joint Base Elmendorf–Richardson, Alaska and assigned to the 176th Wing. The 249th was an associate unit of the 517th Airlift Squadron, which was equipped with the Boeing C-17 Globemaster III.

== Mission ==
The 249th's mission was strategic airlift of troops and cargo to main operating bases or forward locations worldwide. It also conducted theater airlift, aeromedical evacuation and tactical airdrop missions. Tactics to accomplish the mission include air refueling, low-level contour navigation and use of night vision goggles. Its crews mix with crews from the active-duty Air Force 517th Airlift Squadron to fly eight Boeing C-17 Globemaster III jets around the world. In the event of mobilization the squadron would become an element of Pacific Air Forces.

== History ==
In association with the 517th, the Alaska Air National Guard established a detachment of the 176th Operations Group in 2007 to fly airlift missions. The detachment was organized under the "classic" association model in which the 517th retained principal responsibility for the aircraft flown. Although the 517th and the detachment were administratively separate, they were operationally and functionally integrated for performance of missions. Missions flown by the detachment included combat missions in support of Operation Iraqi Freedom and Operation Enduring Freedom in mid-summer of 2007.

On 1 September 2009, with the expansion of the mission, the 249th Airlift Squadron was activated and absorbed the personnel and mission of the detachment. The squadron achieved initial operational capability sixteen days later.

Following the January 2010 Haiti earthquake members of the 249th and three C-17s deployed to Jackson Air National Guard Base to fly cargo and relief assistance personnel to the destroyed areas of Haiti. At Jackson, they integrated with the 183rd Airlift Squadron of the Mississippi Air National Guard. Squadron members flew equipment like fire trucks and fork lifts into Haiti, while evacuating more than 800 refugees on the return trips. In July of that same year, a C-17 flown by a joint crew of the 249th and 517th crashed while practicing for an airshow, killing the four crewmembers aboard the plane.

In the fall of 2011, the squadron once again participated in a major disaster relief operation, when it transported Sikorsky HH-60 Pave Hawk helicopters of the 176th Group to the northeastern United States to assist in recover from Hurricane Irene.

In 2017, the 144th Airlift Squadron, the oldest flying squadron in the Alaska Air National Guard transferred its Lockheed C-130 Hercules aircraft. In order to maintain the 144th as an active unit, the 249th was inactivated and its personnel and equipment were transferred to the 144th in August 2018.

== Lineage ==
- Established as the 249th Airlift Squadron and allotted to the Alaska Air National Guard

Activated on 1 September 2009
Inactivated c. 4 August 2018

=== Assignments ===
- 176th Operations Group, 1 September 2009 – c. 4 August 2018

=== Stations ===
- Kulis Air National Guard Base, Alaska, 1 September 2009

Joint Base Elmendorf–Richardson, Alaska, 18 February 2011 – c. 4 August 2018

=== Aircraft ===
- Boeing C-17 Globemaster III, 2007–2018 (Note: The aircraft flown by the 249th were assigned to the 517th Airlift Squadron of the 3d Wing. It was not assigned aircraft of its own.)

== See also ==
- List of United States Air National Guard squadrons
