= 211th Rescue Squadron =

211th Rescue Squadron

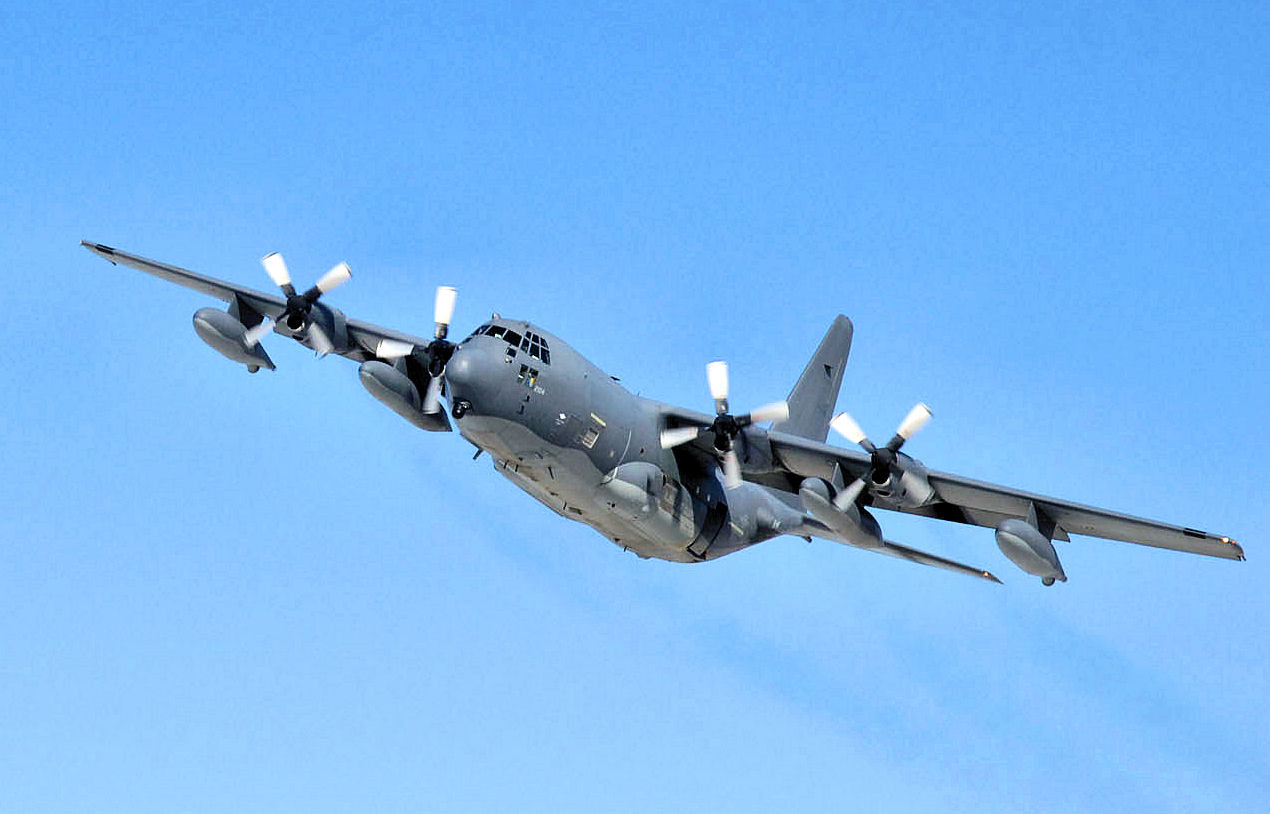
- An HC-130N Hercules from the 210th Rescue Squadron, Anchorage, Alaska
- Active: 2004 – present
- Country: United States
- Allegiance: Alaska
- Branch: Air National Guard
- Type: Squadron
- Role: Combat search and rescue
- Part of: Alaska Air National Guard
- Garrison/HQ: Joint Base Elmendorf-Richardson, Alaska

Insignia
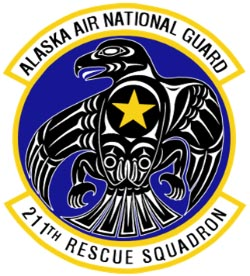
- 211th Rescue Squadron emblem

The 211th Rescue Squadron is a unit of the Alaska Air National Guard 176th Wing located at Joint Base Elmendorf-Richardson, Anchorage, Alaska. The 211th is equipped with the HC-130J Hercules.

== Overview ==
The 211th flies four HC-130 Hercules transports, a version of the C-130 specially modified and upgraded for aerial refueling and combat search-and-rescue missions. These aircraft extend the range of the wing’s HH-60G Pave Hawk helicopters with an air refueling capability.

Established on 8 October 2004 by the Air National Guard as part of a re-organization of Air National Guard rescue units which created separate squadrons for fixed-wing, helicopter and pararescue elements of the 210th Rescue Squadron. All three squadrons are assigned to the 176th Operations Group. The HH-60 helicopter remained the 210th Rescue Squadron; the HC-130P Hercules flight become the 211th Rescue Squadron, and the pararescue flight became the 212th Rescue Squadron.

When in a theater of combat, squadron members operate at the direction of the overall theater combatant commander and the theater's commander of air forces. In these situations, the 211th is primarily assigned to conduct personnel recovery operations—rescuing downed airmen or other isolated personnel from enemy territory, for example. In addition to combat search-and-rescue missions like these, the 211th may also conduct collateral missions: noncombatant evacuation operations, inter- and intra-theater airlift, and support of special operations forces, for example.

Back at home, the 211th Rescue Squadron is part of a network of search-and-rescue organizations that save hundreds of lives in and around Alaska every year. This network includes not only the 211th's sister squadrons in the 176th Wing, but also such agencies as the U.S. Coast Guard, the Alaska State Troopers, the National Park Service, the Civil Air Patrol and others. Other 211th missions include non-combat search and rescue, emergency aeromedical evacuations, humanitarian relief, international aid, counter-drug activities, and support for NASA flight operations.

== Lineage ==
- Constituted as the 211th Air Rescue Squadron and allotted to the Air National Guard

Activated on 8 October 2004

=== Assignments ===
- 176th Operations Group, 8 October 2004 – present

=== Stations ===
- Kulis Air National Guard Base, Alaska, 8 October 2004
- Joint Base Elmendorf-Richardson, Alaska, 18 February 2011 – present

=== Aircraft ===
- Lockheed HC-130 Hercules, 2004 – present
