= 212th Rescue Squadron =

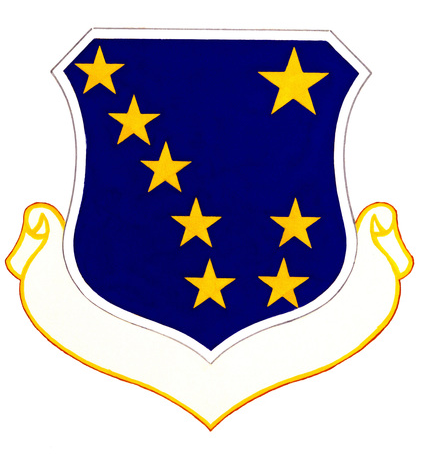
212th Rescue Squadron

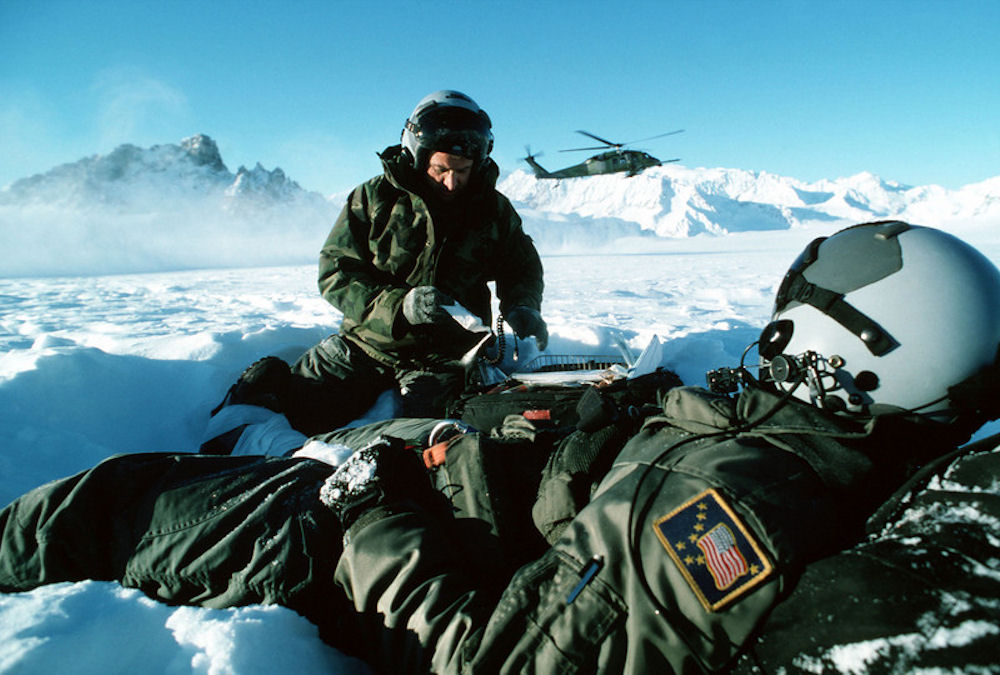
- A U.S. Air Force pararescueman from the 212th Rescue Squadron prepares a splint, while a 210th Rescue Squadron HH-60G Pave Hawk helicopter hovers in the background.
- Active: 2004 – present
- Country: United States
- Allegiance: Alaska
- Branch: Air National Guard
- Type: Squadron
- Role: Combat search and rescue
- Part of: Alaska Air National Guard
- Garrison/HQ: Joint Base Elmendorf-Richardson, Anchorage, Alaska

Insignia
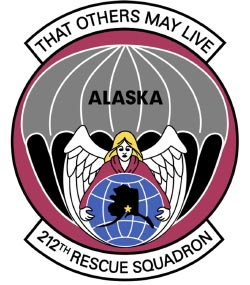
- File:212th Rescue Squadron emblem

The 212th Rescue Squadron is a unit of the Alaska Air National Guard's 176th Wing stationed at Joint Base Elmendorf-Richardson, Anchorage, Alaska. The squadron has no assigned aircraft; personnel assigned use aircraft of the 210th and 211th Rescue Squadrons of the wing.

== Overview ==
Established on 8 October 2004 by the Air National Guard as part of a reorganization of Air National Guard rescue units which created separate squadrons for fixed-wing, helicopter and pararescue elements of the 210th Rescue Squadron.

The HH-60 Pave Hawk helicopter flight remained the 210th Rescue Squadron; the HC-130P Hercules flight become the 211th Rescue Squadron], and the pararescue flight became the 212th Rescue Squadron. The 212th also received additional manning and combat rescue officers, which further increased its capabilities.

The squadron consists of pararescue and support personnel, using the HH-60 Pave Hawk helicopters of the 210th Rescue Squadron and the HC-130P Hercules transports of the 211th Rescue Squadron. All three squadrons are assigned to the 176th Operations Group.

== Lineage ==
- Constituted as the 212th Rescue Squadron and allotted to the Air National Guard

Activated on 8 October 2004

=== Assignments ===
- 176th Operations Group, 8 October 2004 – present

=== Stations ===
- Kulis Air National Guard Base, Alaska, 8 October 2004
- Joint Base Elmendorf–Richardson, Alaska, 18 February 2011 – present
