= 144th Airlift Squadron =

144th Airlift Squadron

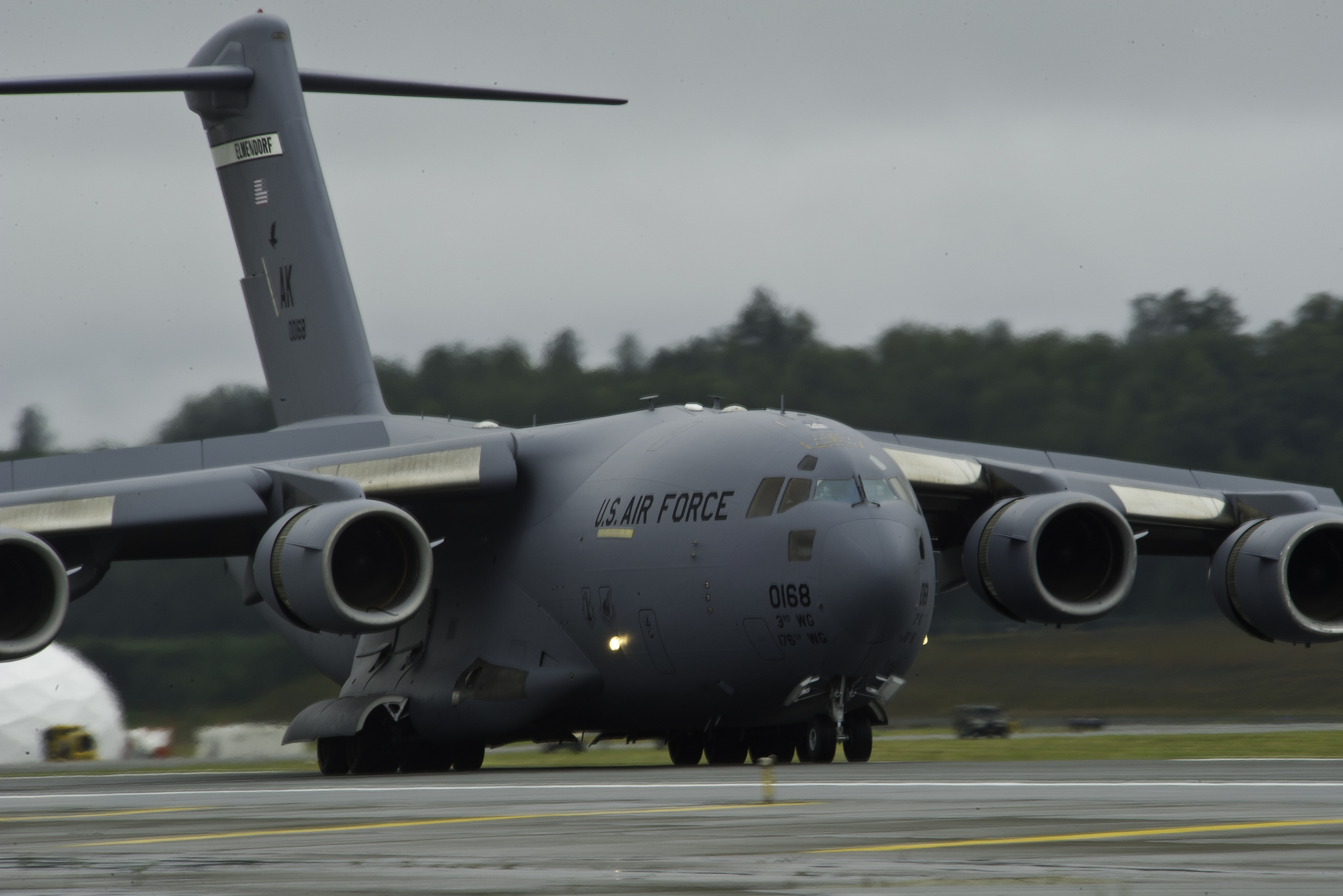
- 144AS/517AS C-17 Globemaster III
- Active: 1953–present
- Country: United States
- Allegiance: Alaska
- Branch: Air National Guard
- Type: Squadron
- Role: Airlift
- Part of: Alaska Air National Guard
- Garrison/HQ: Joint Base Elmendorf-Richardson, Alaska
- Decorations: Air Force Outstanding Unit Award

Insignia
- 144th Airlift Squadron emblem
- Tail code: AK (Note: Superimposed over the tail code on the left side of the fin is a wolf (for the 144th Airlift Squadron) and on the right side a firebird (for the 517th Airlift Squadron).)
- Tail stripe: Blue "Anchorage" in yellow, Big Dipper

Aircraft flown
- Transport: C-17 Globemaster III

The 144th Airlift Squadron is a unit of the Alaska Air National Guard 176th Wing located at Joint Base Elmendorf-Richardson, Anchorage, Alaska. The 144th is an associate unit of the active 517th Airlift Squadron, equipped with the C-17 Globemaster III.

== Mission ==
The 144th's mission is to provide trained aircrews and support personnel for airlift and airdrop during all contingencies in the Pacific Theater. The state mission is to provide emergency and humanitarian support when called on by the governor.

== History ==
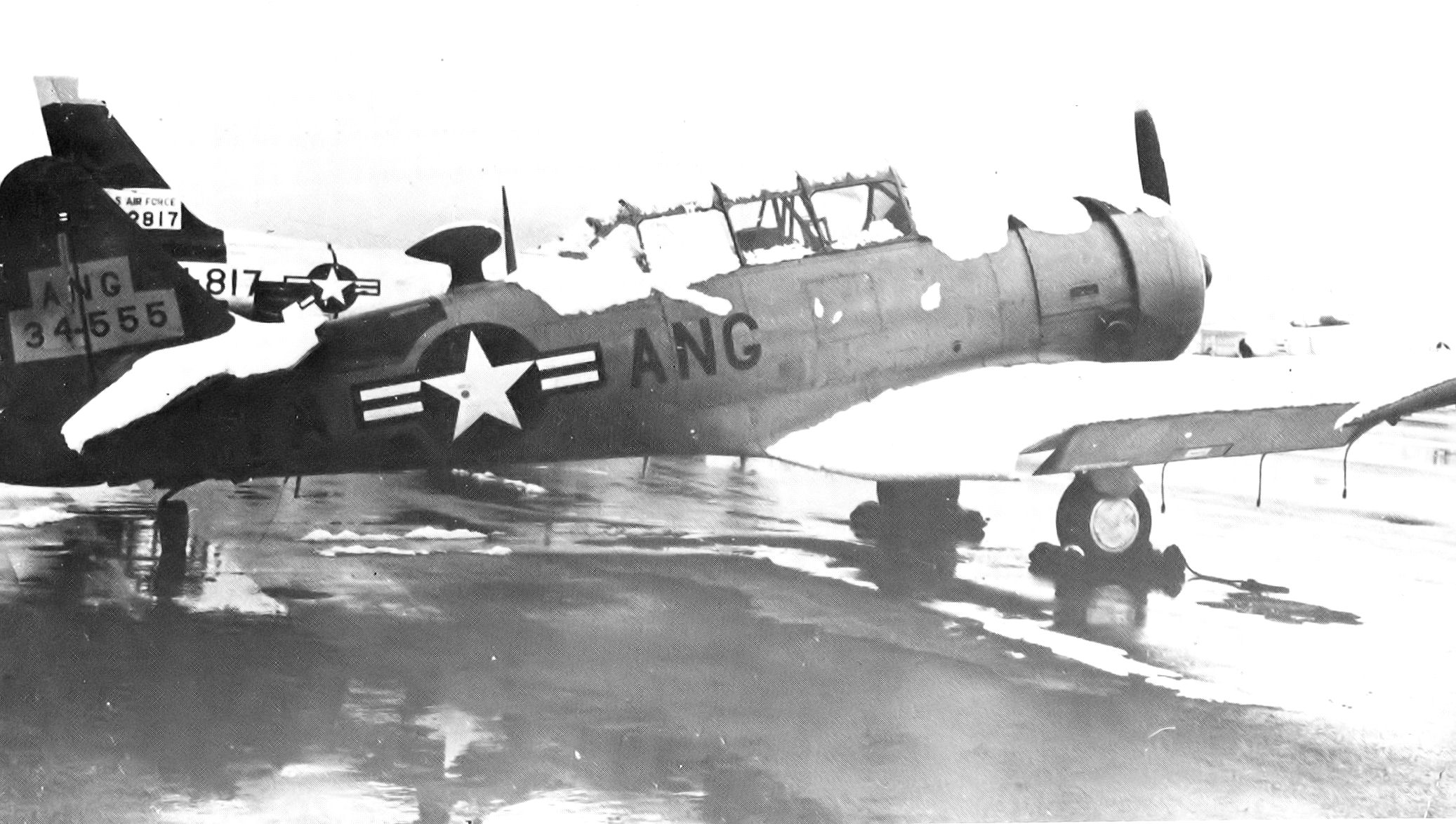
8144th Squadron AT-6D Texan (Note: Aircraft is North American AT-6D-NT Texan, serial 41-34555. This was the first aircraft supplied to the Alaska Air National Guard.)

=== Background ===
In July 1952, at a meeting for city officials and businessmen at the Anchorage YMCA, National Guard air division Commander Maj. Gen. Earl T. Ricks announced that the territorial government of Alaska was willing to invest $1.5 million to establish an Air National Guard unit in Anchorage, either at the city's international airport or on Elmendorf Air Force Base. The only condition: that enough people could be recruited to man the unit.

The Alaska Air National Guard was organized 15 September 1952 as the 8144th Air Base Squadron. At its creation, the 8144th included 11 enlisted men and five officers. It had no planes. Its headquarters were located in a small office above what was then the bus depot on Fourth Avenue in Anchorage. Because the office was so small, the men convened for their first training assembly in a nearby Quonset hut. The unit's first aircraft, a 1941 AT-6D Texan trainer, arrived in February 1953. Soon five more trainers arrived, operating out of Elmendorf Hangar No. 3. In keeping with the Air Guard's mission to provide national air defense, the pilots began training in earnest for their planned transition to jet fighters.

As that training progressed, the 8144th was replaced by the 144th Fighter-Bomber Squadron in July 1953. The unit training assemblies were conducted at Elmendorf Air Force Base. Ultimately, five T-6G Texan trainers were assigned and everyone was busy getting ready to transition into jet aircraft.

=== Air defense mission ===
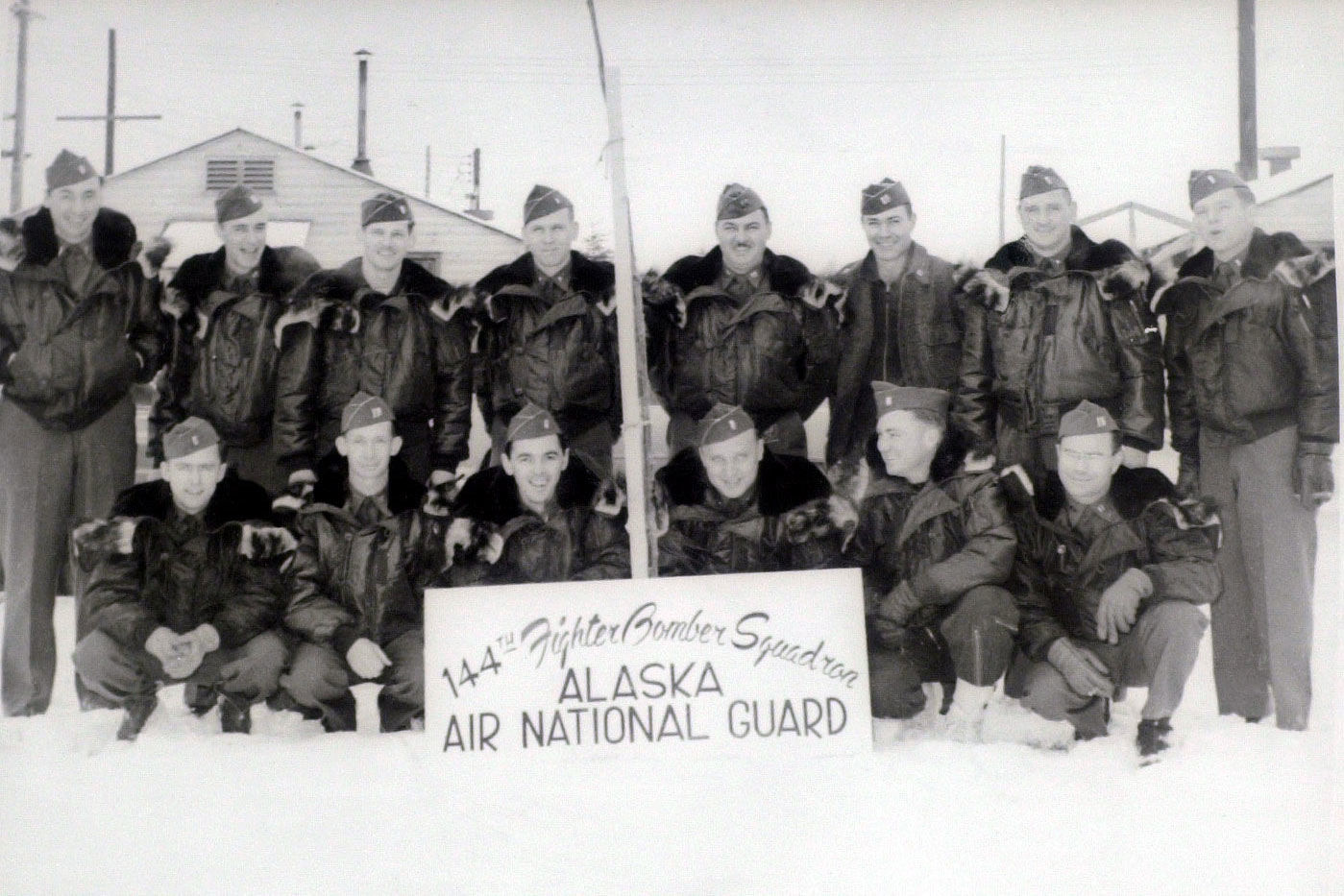
The new 144th Fighter-Bomber Squadron poses for a picture during the winter of 1953.

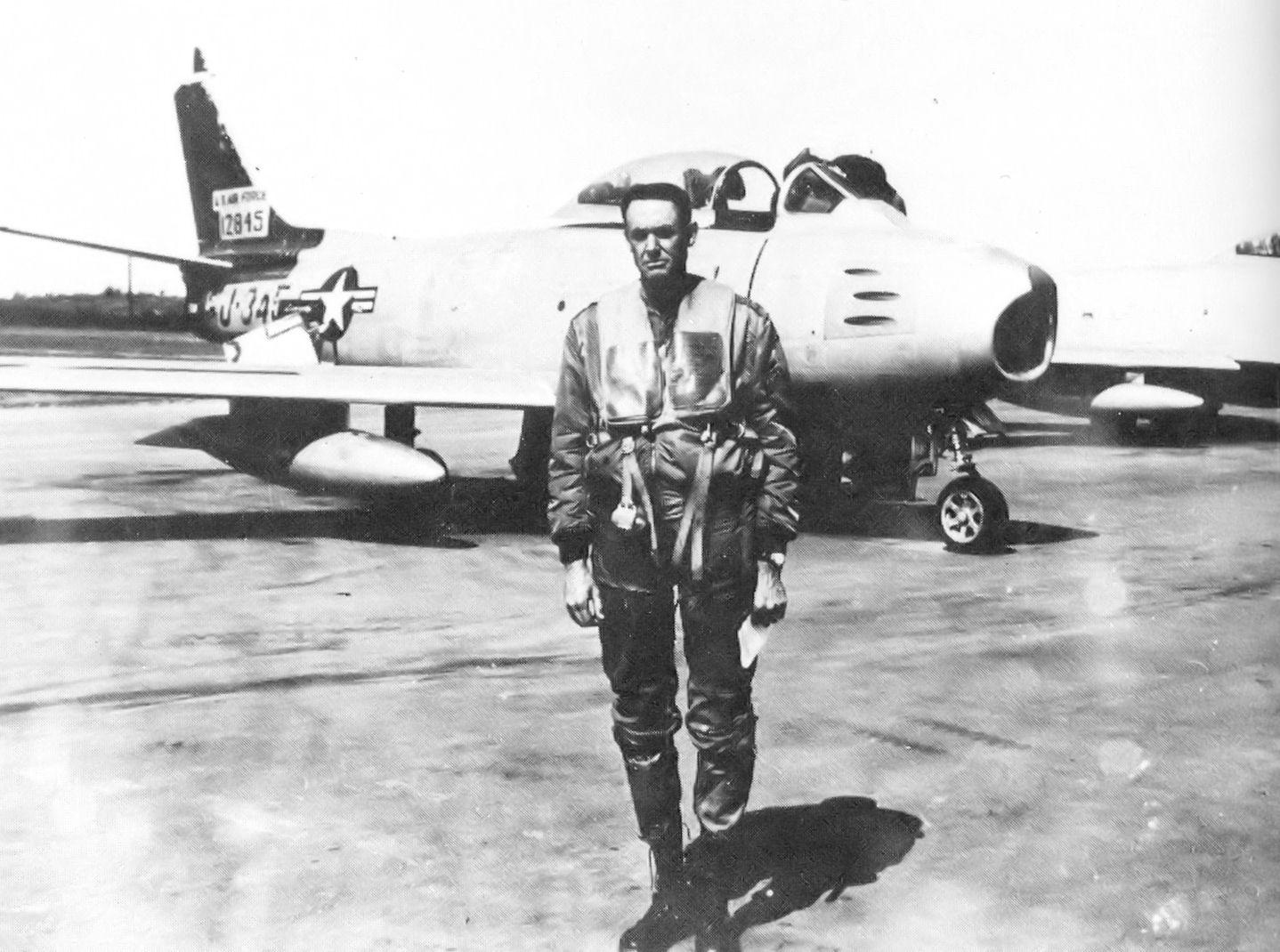
144th Fighter-Interceptor Squadron F-86E Sabre (Note: Aircraft is North American F-86E-10-NA Sabre, serial 51-2845. The pilot, W.S. Elmore, later became the Alaska State Adjutant General.)

The first jet, a T-33 Shooting Star trainer, arrived in October 1953 and in the spring of 1954, the unit received its first operational aircraft, the F-80C Shooting Star jet fighter. By the first annual training period, unit strength has increased to 15 officers and 49 enlisted men, and was fully equipped with 14 F-80s, two T-33s, three T-6G trainers, two T-6 observation planes and a single C-47A transport.

In 1955, the unit moved from Elmendorf to its own base by the Anchorage Airport. Kulis Air National Guard Base was named after First Lieutenant Albert Kulis, an ANG pilot who lost his life while flying his F-80C during a return flight from a night training mission.

In July 1955 the 144th's F-80s were exchanged for brand-new, top-of-the-line F-86E Sabre fighter jets. Along with the new aircraft came the unit's third designation in as many years, this time the 144th Fighter Interceptor Squadron. This was at the time other Air National Guard units around the country were receiving surplus aircraft. The 144th took over much of the mission of the 720th Fighter-Bomber Squadron, which was inactivated at Eielson Air Force Base.

=== Airlift mission ===
The mission of the 144th was changed to airlift in 1957. With the arrival of the C-47A Skytrain (nickname Gooney Bird), the unit was re-designated the 144th Air Transport Squadron, Light on 1 July 1957. The 144th is the only Air National Guard unit ever to be assigned C-47's as the primary mission aircraft. The mission of the squadron became the logistical support of the Alaskan Air Command aircraft control and warning (radar) sites, all of which were in remote areas with rough gravel runways.

The C-47 was ideal for this mission, as it could get into and also fly out of the rough small landing strips. Also the C-47 was quite durable, which meant it could handle the weather of Alaska unlike other aircraft. It could land on a snow-covered runway, a frozen lake, and sloping gravel strips in all types of weather. These abilities were not possessed by the larger C-119 Flying Boxcar or C-46 Commando. The 144th received six C-47As from other Air National Guard squadrons in the CONUS.

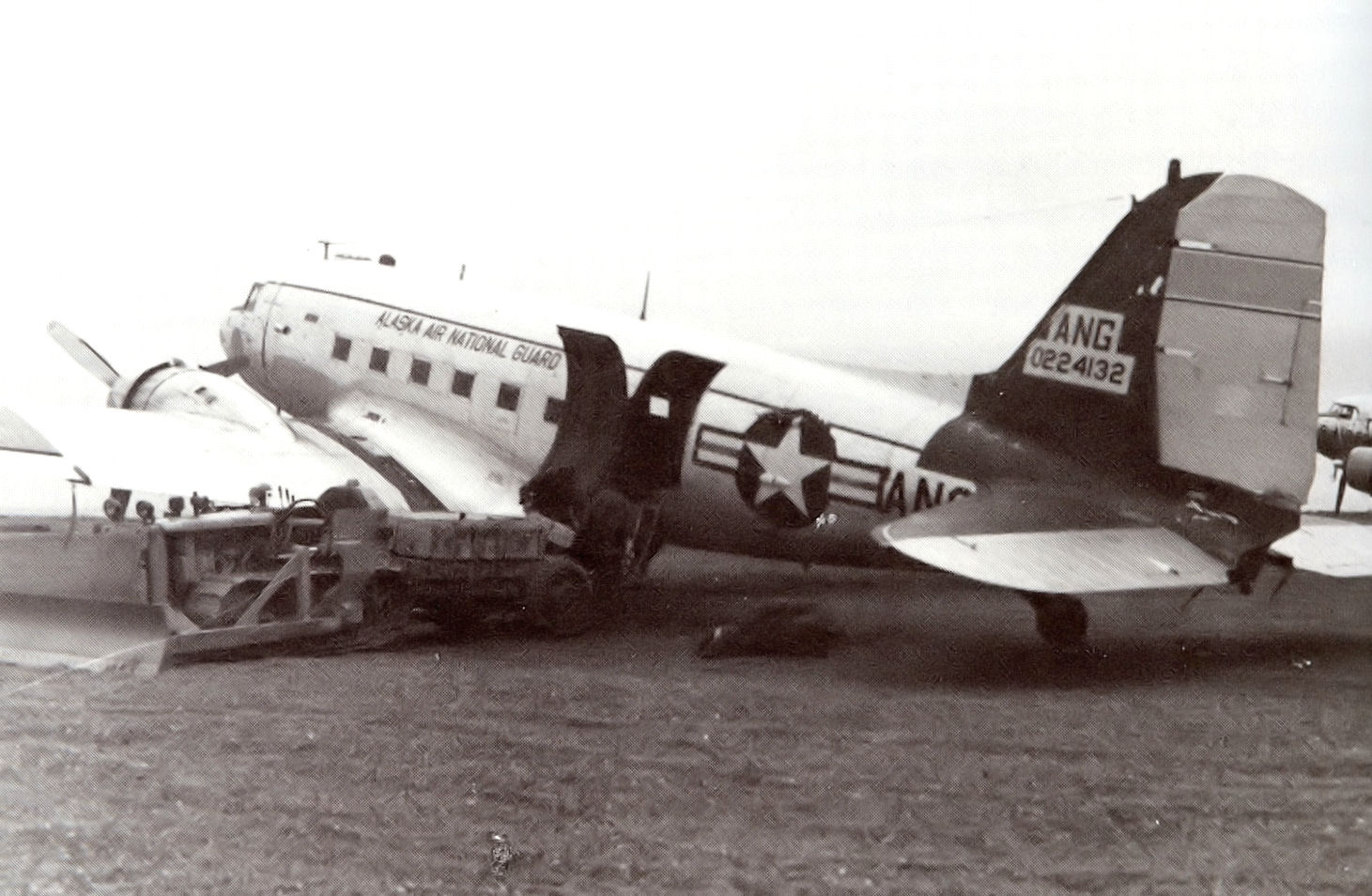
144th Air Transportation Squadron C-47A Skytrain (Note: Aircraft is Douglas C-47A-45-DL Skytrain, serial 42-24132, taken about 1960.)

One of the more notable missions flown by the 144th was "Operation Santa Claus", which began in December 1957 when the squadron was called on to make an emergency airdrop of supplies to the community of St. Mary's Mission on the Yukon River in southwestern Alaska. The 144th later "adopted" the village. The program continued over the years and grew to the point that, by 1972, virtually the entire city of Anchorage supported it. The annual Christmas gifts continued until 1977 when other mission requirements forced the unit to end it.

In 1960, the aging C-47s were replaced by the larger C-123J Provider; a tactical airlift transport—and the unit was again redesignated the 144th Air Transport Squadron, Medium. The C-123Js were equipped with wingtip mounted Fairchild J44 jet engines and could handle heavy payloads and also helped offset the drag of the ski modification added to give the aircraft the capability to be operated off frozen runways and icy surfaces. The C-123Js were transferred from the 4083d Strategic Wing, Ernest Harmon Air Force Base, Newfoundland. The 144th operated the only ski-equipped C-123Js in the Air Force system, and were far better equipment than the C-47As.

The C-123Js could be operated anywhere in Alaska, with landings on open snow fields, glaciers and frozen lakes being routinely made. The 144th also supported Harvard University's glaciology experiments on the Taku Glacier near Juneau. The aircraft were also used as part of the 1957–1958 International Geophysical Year experiments, which were conducted in Alaska and the Canadian Yukon Territory.

On 27 March 1964, the largest earthquake in the recorded history of North America struck South-Central Alaska. Tsunamis devastated Valdez, Seward and Kodiak. Gaping fissures, crumbled buildings and burst pipes dotted Anchorage. In the immediate aftermath, Major James Rowe arrived at Kulis from the airport, reporting that its control tower had been demolished. Two Air Guard members sped over with a wrecking truck, which they used to free three men trapped in the rubble. Rowe, meanwhile, started the engines of a C-123 and went aloft, serving as an emergency control tower and relaying what he could see to the rest of the world.

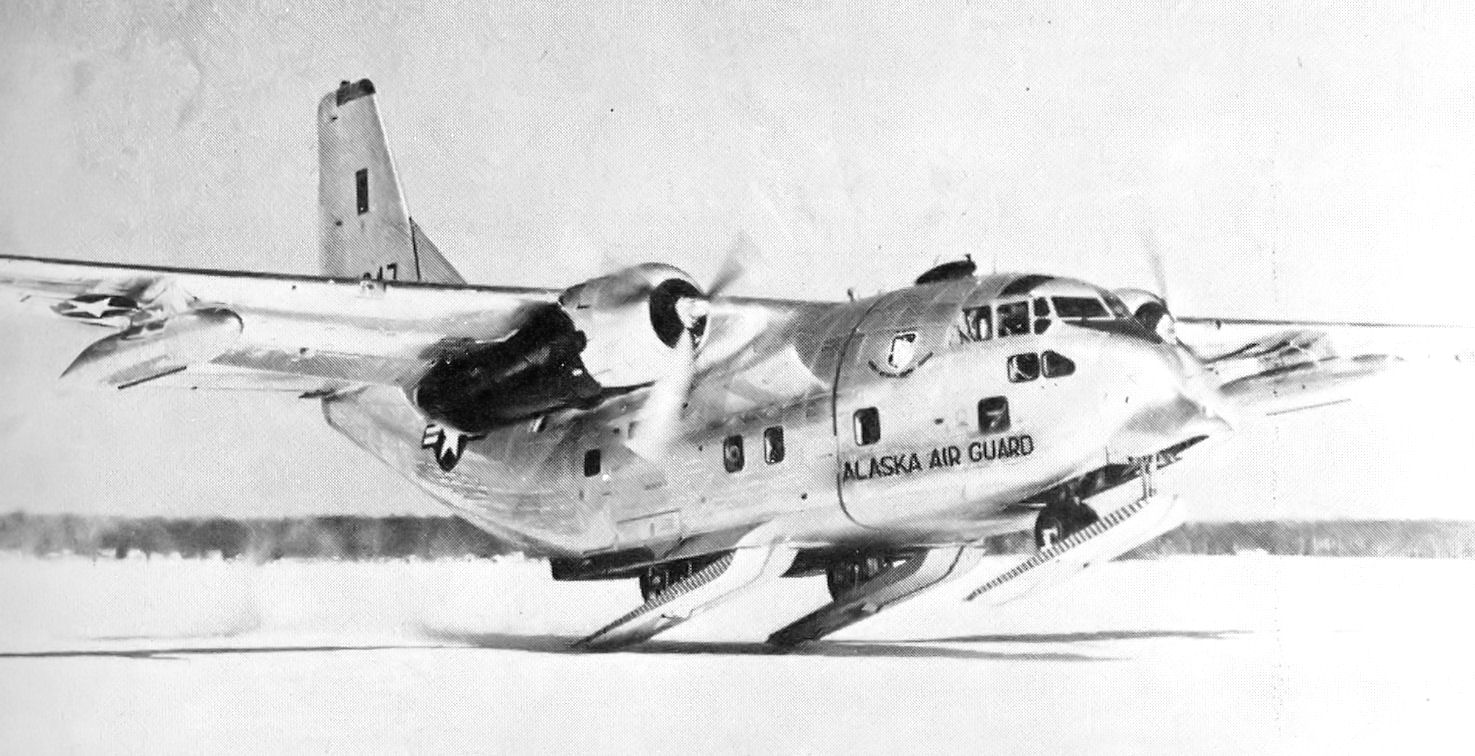
144th Air Transportation Squadron C-123J Provider (Note: Aircraft is Fairchild C-123J-8-FA Provider, serial 54-0647. This plane crashed at Cape Romanzof AFS, Alaska 15 December 1965 when it hit just below the top of a mountain. All 5 aboard were killed.)

Within 20 minutes after the quake ended, the Anchorage Times reported, Guard members began streaming into Kulis without being called. Personnel from the Motor Vehicle Section supplied electricity using emergency power units. Maintenance Squadron members took emergency steps to bring heat to strategic buildings, and the dispensary was prepared by medical technicians. A warehouse on base was converted to a shelter for civilians rendered homeless by the quake, with a makeshift dining hall and over 100 beds. By midnight, 97 of those beds were occupied. Over the next few weeks the 144th would fly 131,000 pounds of cargo and 201 passengers in support of earthquake relief efforts

The squadron won an Air Force Outstanding Unit Award in 1964 as a result of its efforts in assisting small communities bordering Prince William Sound following the 1964 Good Friday earthquake. As most of the personnel of the 144th were from the Anchorage area, which was badly damaged in the quake, they left their homes and families to assist others and were considered to be highly professional and helped others in a time of their own extreme stress.

A second Air Force Outstanding Unit Award was earned by the 144th in assisting residents of Fairbanks during the 1967 flood. An ice-jam on the Nenana and Tanana Rivers caused flooding in the city and only five hours after receiving a call for assistance, the squadron began a series of many C-123 flights to evacuate survivors and move supplies into the stricken area. Also some of the homeless were sheltered at Kulis Air National Guard Base until the waters receded and they could return to their homes.

In July 1969, the Guard at Kulis was reorganized as the 176th Tactical Airlift Group. Concurrently, the squadron was redesignated the 144th Tactical Airlift Squadron and became the group's primary mission unit.

=== Worldwide airlift ===
In 1975, the 144th's gaining command was changed from Alaskan Air Command to Military Airlift Command as part of the "Total Force" concept. After 16 years operating C-123's, the squadron converted to the C-130E Hercules aircraft. The first of eight four-engine Vietnam veteran turboprops was received in early 1976, and the 144th became equipped for a truly global mission. Their range, speed, and airlift capabilities were more than double those of the C-123's they replaced.

With its new C-130s, the 176th Group began participating in the Total Force almost immediately, flying to Panama, West Germany, South Korea and elsewhere to support U.S. military and humanitarian missions. It also began taking on greater responsibilities in the annual Brim Frost joint force exercises, and took part in the Red Flag war games program at Nellis Air Force Base, Nevada.

All this new activity would require a stronger support infrastructure, and in 1977 Alaska Air National Guard kicked off one of its largest construction projects ever. More than $3 million was invested in a new composite maintenance building, an aerospace ground equipment support building and a new petroleum operations facility on Kulis.

In July 1983, the 144th again updated aircraft, this time converting to brand new C-130H2 Hercules aircraft directly from the factory. The new aircraft has even longer range and more speed than the "E" model, essential to the unit's growing worldwide mission commitment. In mid-1992, the squadron was re-designated as the 144th Airlift Squadron and gained by Pacific Air Forces (PACAF). Shortly thereafter, the unit upgraded in the Enhanced Station Keeping System to enable it to fly formation in the weather.

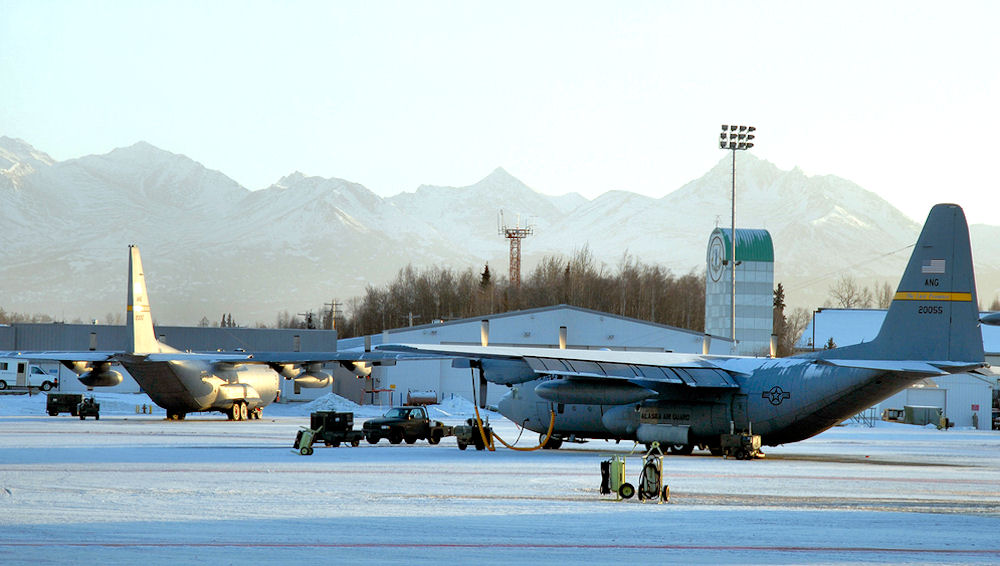
C-130s of the 144th Airlift Squadron prepare for the move to Joint Base Elmendorf-Richardson.

The 144th Airlift Squadron performed humanitarian airlift missions for famine relief in Somalia and Rwanda, supported Operation Southern Watch in Saudi Arabia, achieved an Excellent rating in its first operational readiness inspection from PACAF. On 1 October 1996, the squadron entered a one-year conversion to deployment tasking from its previous in-place generation tasking. Aircrews of the 144th have flown to the far reaches of the globe, performing missions in Panama, Thailand, Japan, Australia and Germany. The unit also participated in Operation Full Accounting, an effort to bring back remains of Americans from Vietnam, Laos and Cambodia. Recently, the squadron has deployed members in support of Operation Enduring Freedom and Operation Iraqi Freedom.

In 2005, the Base Realignment and Closure Commission recommended that Kulis be closed and the wing be relocated to Joint Base Elmendorf-Richardson. The move was considered a good fit, given the growing mission of the wing, and the state of Alaska supported the recommendation. The 144th Airlift Squadron closed Kulis and moved in February 2011. In March 2017, the squadron lost the last of its C-130H aircraft, but remained active without aircraft. The decision was made to inactivate the junior 249th Airlift Squadron, which was flying the Boeing C-17 Globemaster III and transfer its personnel to the 144th, making the 144th an associate unit of the active 517th Airlift Squadron. The C17 mission was transferred to the 144th Airlift Squadron August 4 2018.

Association denotes a relationship in which active-component and Air National Guard airmen work together as total force partners in accomplishing the mission. The host and associate each retain command authority of their own forces, separate organizational structures and chains of command but the active-duty Air Force did own the airframes, now the 176th Wing of the Alaska Air National Guard own the airframes.

== Lineage ==
Constituted as the 144th Fighter-Bomber Squadron and allotted to the Air National Guard
Activated and received federal recognition on 1 July 1953
Redesignated 144th Fighter Interceptor Squadron on 1 July 1955
Redesignated 144th Air Transport Squadron, Light on 1 July 1957
Redesignated 144th Air Transport Squadron, Medium on 1 December 1960
Redesignated 144th Tactical Airlift Squadron on 1 April 1969
Redesignated 144th Airlift Squadron on 15 March 1992

=== Assignments ===
- Alaska Air National Guard, 1 July 1953
- 176th Tactical Airlift Group, (later 176th Composite Group, 176th Group), 1 April 1969
- 176th Operations Group, 1 October 1995 – present

=== Stations ===
- Elmendorf Air Force Base, Alaska, 15 September 1952
- Kulis Air National Guard Base, Alaska, 1 July 1955
- Joint Base Elmendorf-Richardson, Alaska, 18 Feb 2011 – present.

=== Aircraft ===
- F-80C Shooting Star, 1953–1955
- F-86E Sabre, 1955–1957
- C-47A Skytrain, 1957–1960
- C-123J Provider, 1960–1976
- C-130E Hercules, 1976–1985
- C-130H2 Hercules, 1985–2017
- Boeing C-17 Globemaster III
