= 176th Wing =

Unit of the Alaska Air National Guard

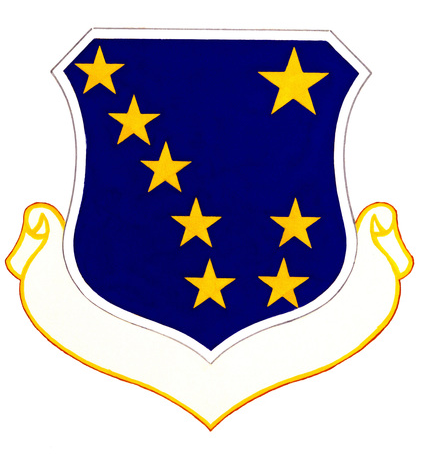
176th Wing

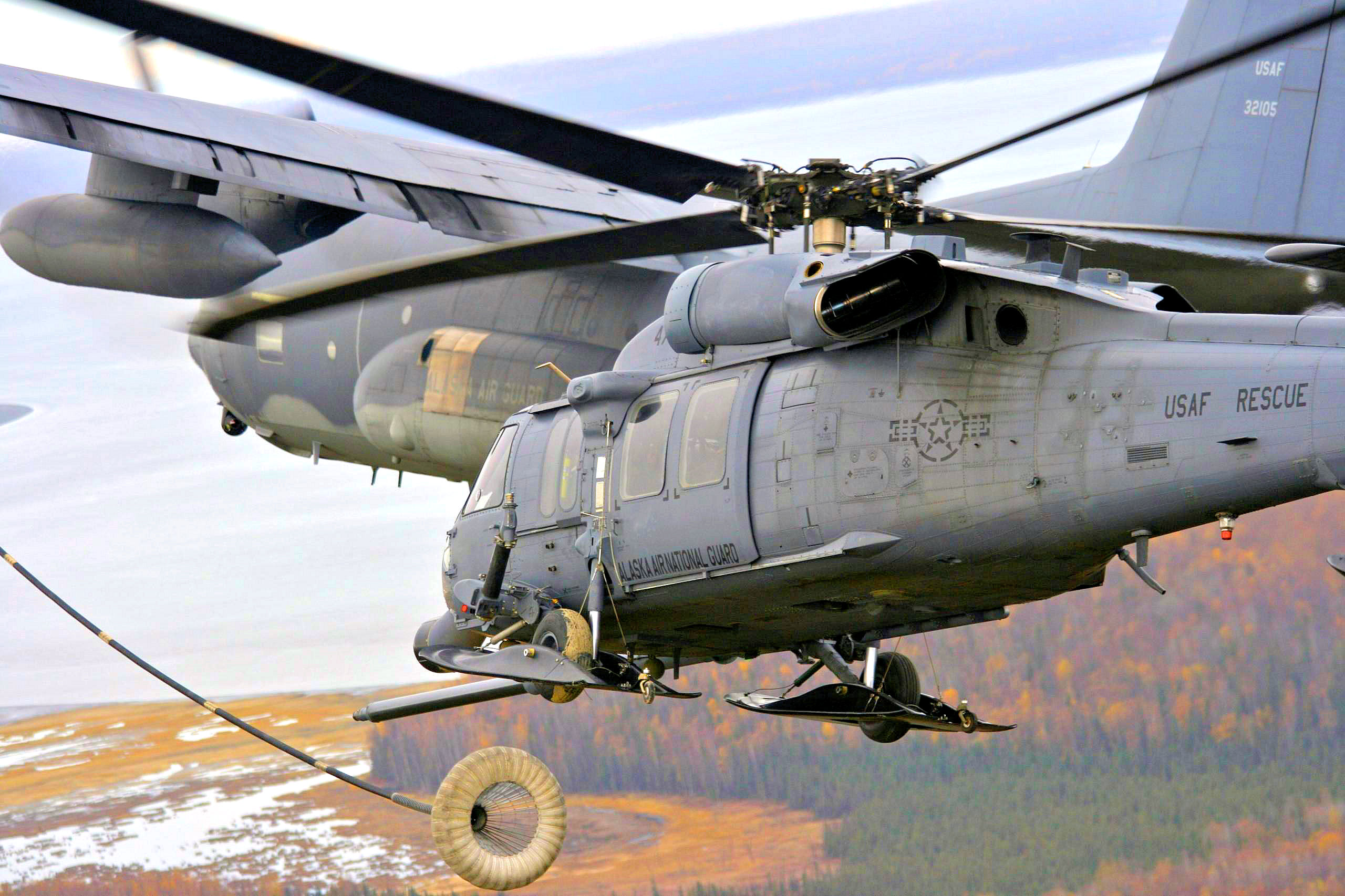
- 144th Airlift Squadron C-17A Globemaster III HH-60G Pave Hawk of the 210th Rescue Squadron prepares to refuel from a 211th Rescue Squadron HC-130 Hercules 176th Air Defense Squadron at the Alaska NORAD Region (ANR).
- Active: 1 April 1969 – present
- Country: United States
- Allegiance: Alaska
- Branch: Air National Guard
- Type: Wing
- Role: Composite
- Part of: Alaska Air National Guard
- Garrison/HQ: Joint Base Elmendorf-Richardson, Anchorage, Alaska

Commanders
- Current commander: Brig. Gen. Joshua D. Armstrong

Insignia
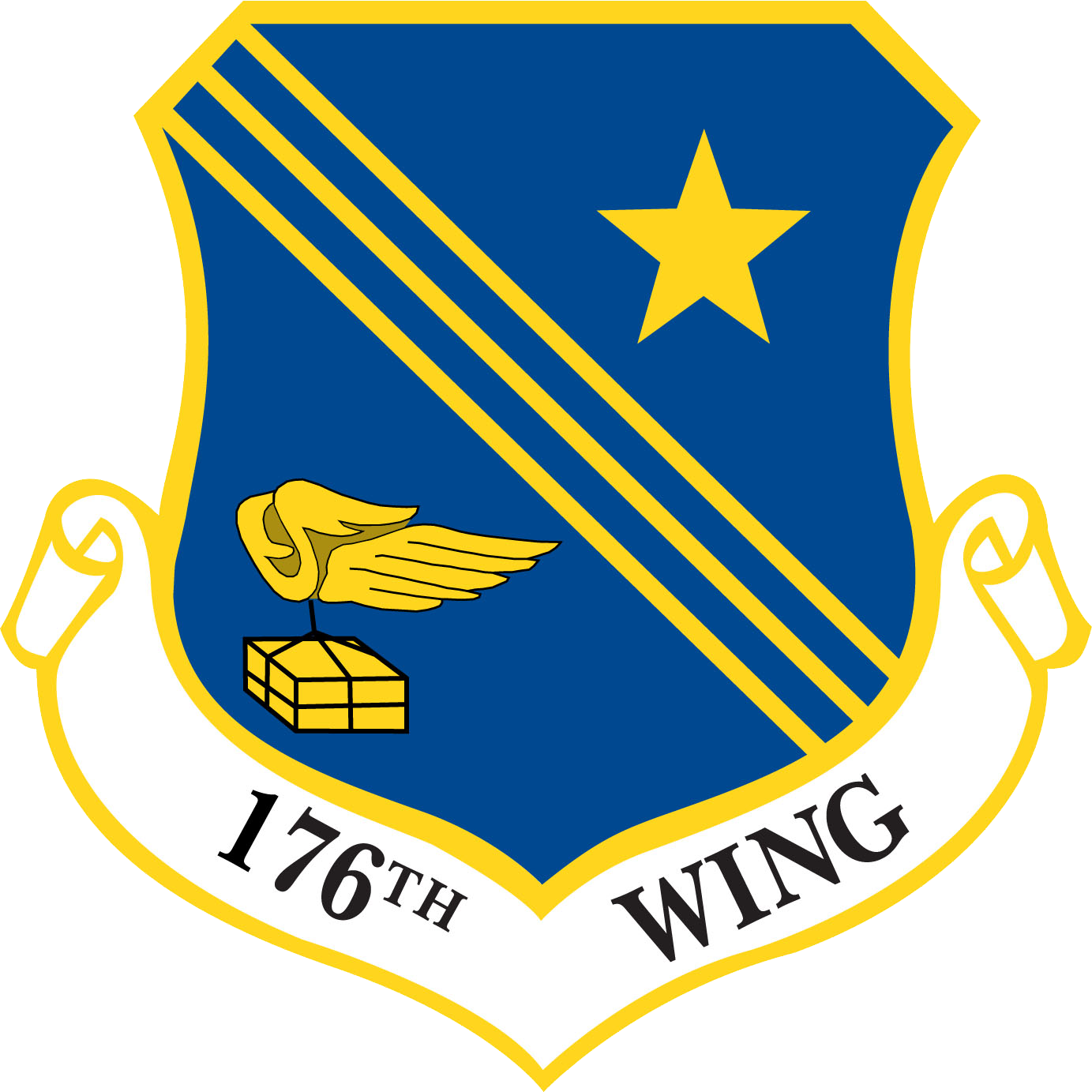
- 176th Wing emblem

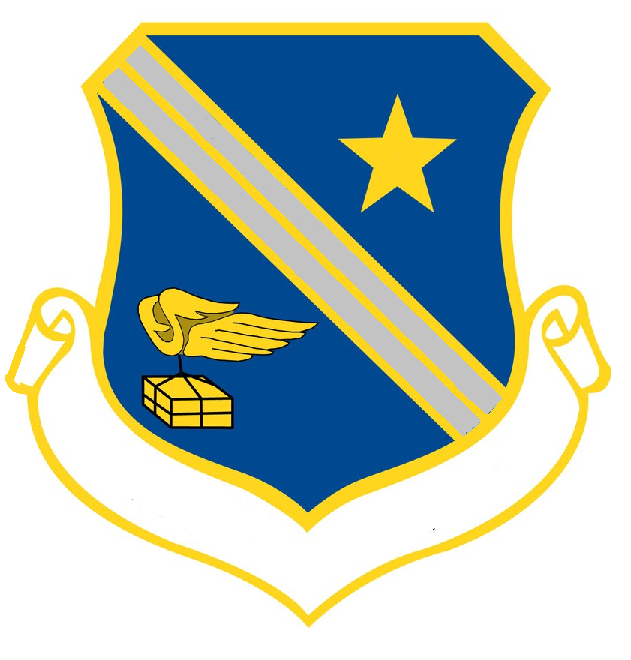
- 176th Tactical Airlift Group emblem

Aircraft flown
- Helicopter: HH-60G Pave Hawk
- Transport: C-17 Globemaster III; HC-130J Combat King II

The 176th Wing is a unit of the Alaska Air National Guard, stationed at Joint Base Elmendorf-Richardson (JBER), Anchorage, Alaska. If activated to federal service, components of the Wing are gained by several United States Air Force Major Commands.

== Overview ==
The 176 Wing is the largest unit of the Alaska Air National Guard. It is a composite wing — meaning a wing which operates more than one type of aircraft; each having different mission objectives. From 1969 to 2011 the 176th Wing was based at Kulis Air National Guard Base, located adjacent to Ted Stevens Anchorage International Airport and approximately 15 miles from JBER. It was recommended for relocation as part of the 2005 Base Realignment and Closure (BRAC) process. It now operates out of a set of new and renovated buildings on JBER in an area known colloquially as Camp Kulis.

== Units ==
The 176th Wing is one of the largest and most complex wings in the Air National Guard. It consists of several major components:

- 176th Operations Group

The Operations Group comprises the units that directly execute the wing's missions: tactical airlift, strategic airlift, air control, and combat search and rescue. These subsidiary units are:
144th Airlift Squadron

Established in 1952, it is the senior unit of the Alaska Air National Guard. The 144th's mission is to provide trained aircrews and support personnel for airlift and airdrop during all contingencies in the Pacific Theater via eight C-17 Globemaster aircraft. Gained by: Pacific Air Forces

176th Air Defense Squadron

Established in 2004, the unit's history goes back to 1951. Operates the Alaska NORAD Region (ANR) . Maintains 24-hour-a-day, seven-day-a-week capability to detect, validate and warn of any atmospheric threat to North American air sovereignty in the ANR. Gained by: NORAD

210th Rescue Squadron
211th Rescue Squadron
212th Rescue Squadron

These three squadrons comprise the Combat Search and Rescue/Personnel Recovery (CSAR/PR) component of the wing. The 210th RQS was established in 1990, the units history goes back to 1946. Equipped with HH-60G Pave Hawk Helicopters, HC-130J COMBAT KING II specialized Hercules transports and highly qualified pararescue personnel (CROs + PJs). Gained by: Pacific Air Forces

- 176th Maintenance Group

Maintains the Wing's aircraft and insures they are kept in an operationally ready state to carry out the missions of the operational squadrons. Also maintains and services transient aircraft using the Great Circle Route to the Northern Pacific region, Canada, and the United States.

- 176th Mission Support Group

The group encompasses a wide variety of units. Together, they provide a range of specialized services and programs in support of the wing's flying missions.

- 176th Medical Group

The wing's Medical Group ensures our men and women are healthy and fit to fight

- 11th Rescue Coordination Center

Monitors Alaska around the clock. The 11th RCC coordinates the life-saving work of not only the wing's rescue units, but also those of the Alaska State Troopers, the U.S. Coast Guard and the National Park Service, among others.

- 176th Wing Staff

This unit includes the Wing Commander and Vice Commander, and an array of support sections that report directly to wing leadership:

== History ==
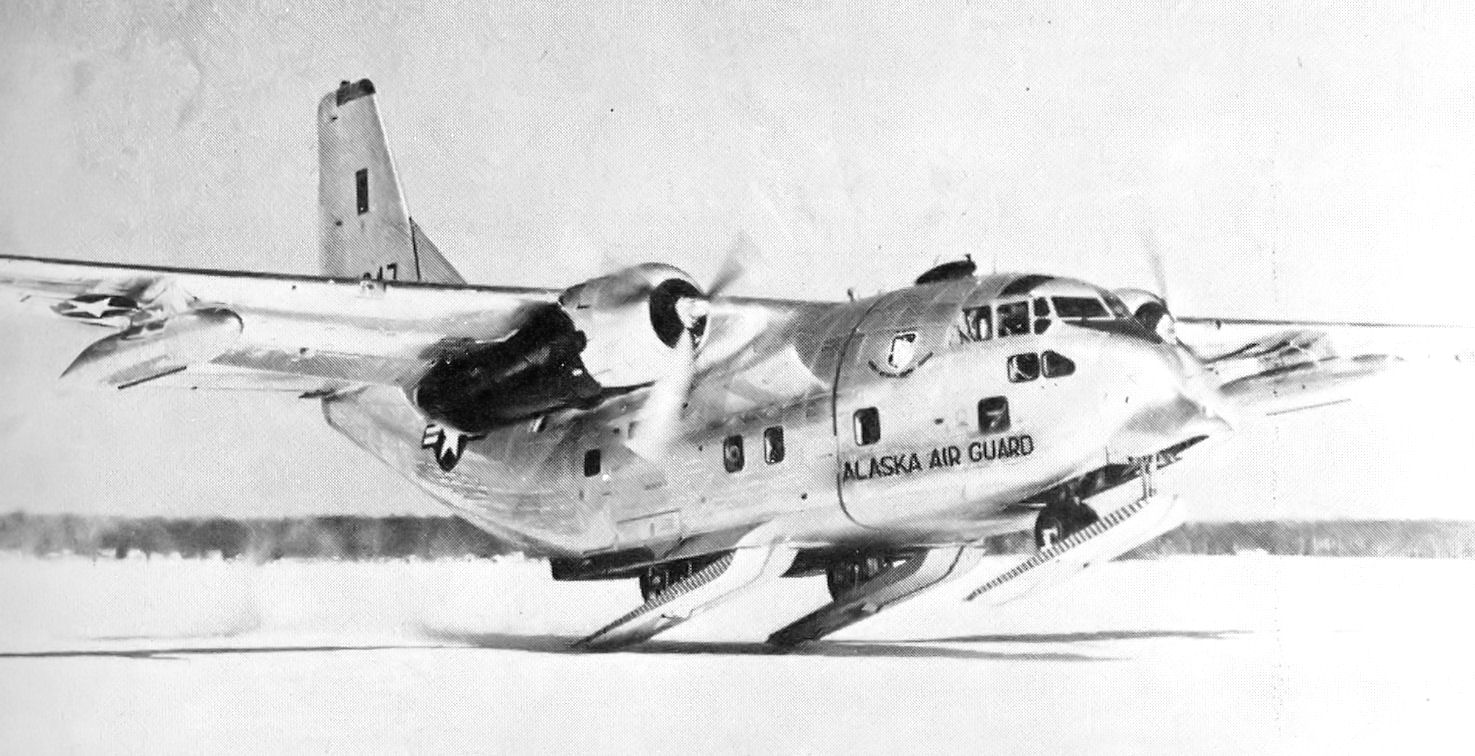
144th Tactical Airlift Squadron Fairchild C-123J-8-FA Provider 54-647

In 1969, the Alaska Air National Guard 144th Tactical Airlift Squadron (TAS) was authorized to expand to a group level, and the 176th Tactical Airlift Group (TAG) was established by the National Guard Bureau. The 176th TAG received federal recognition and was activated on 1 April 1969. The 144th TAS was assigned as the new unit's operational squadron, flying C-123J Provider transports. Other units formed by the new Group were the 176th Headquarters, 176th Material Squadron (Maintenance), 176th Combat Support Squadron, and the 176th USAF Dispensary.

In the early 1970s, the mission of the 176th TAG was primarily the logistical support of the Alaskan Air Command Aircraft Control and Warning (Radar) Sites, all of which were in remote areas with rough gravel runways. The C-123Js were equipped with wingtip mounted J-44 jet engines and could handle heavy payloads and also helped offset the drag of the ski modification added to give the aircraft the capability to be operated off frozen runways and icy surfaces. The 176th operated the only ski-equipped C-123Js in the Air Force.

=== Worldwide tactical airlift ===
In 1975, the 144th gaining command was changed from the Alaskan Air Command (AAC) to the Military Airlift Command (MAC) as part of the "Total Force" concept. After 16 years operating C-123's, the squadron converted to the C-130E Hercules aircraft. The first of eight four-engine Vietnam veteran turboprops was received in early 1976, and the 144th became equipped for a truly global mission. Their range, speed, and airlift capabilities were more than double those of the C-123's they replaced.

With its new C-130s, the 176th Group began participating in the Total Force almost immediately, flying to Panama, West Germany, South Korea and elsewhere to support U.S. military and humanitarian missions. It also began taking on greater responsibilities in the annual Brim Frost joint force exercises, and took part in the "Red Flag" war games program at Nellis AFB, Nevada.

All this new activity would require a stronger support infrastructure, and in 1977 Alaska Air National Guard kicked off one of its largest construction projects ever. More than $3 million was invested in a new composite maintenance building, an aerospace ground equipment (AGE) support building and a new petroleum operations facility on Kulis AGB.

In July 1983, the 144th again updated aircraft, this time converting to brand new C-130H2 Hercules aircraft directly from the factory. The new aircraft has even longer range and more speed than the "E" model, essential to the unit's growing worldwide mission commitment. In mid-1992, the squadron was re-designated as the 144th Airlift Squadron and gained by the Pacific Air Forces (PACAF). Shortly thereafter, the unit upgraded in the Enhanced Station Keeping System (E-SKE) to enable it to fly formation in the weather.

=== Air refueling ===
In 1986 the 168th Fighter-Interceptor Squadron was transferred from the Illinois ANG to the Alaska Air National Guard. It was re-designated as the 168th Air Refueling Squadron, extended federal recognition and activated on 1 October 1986.

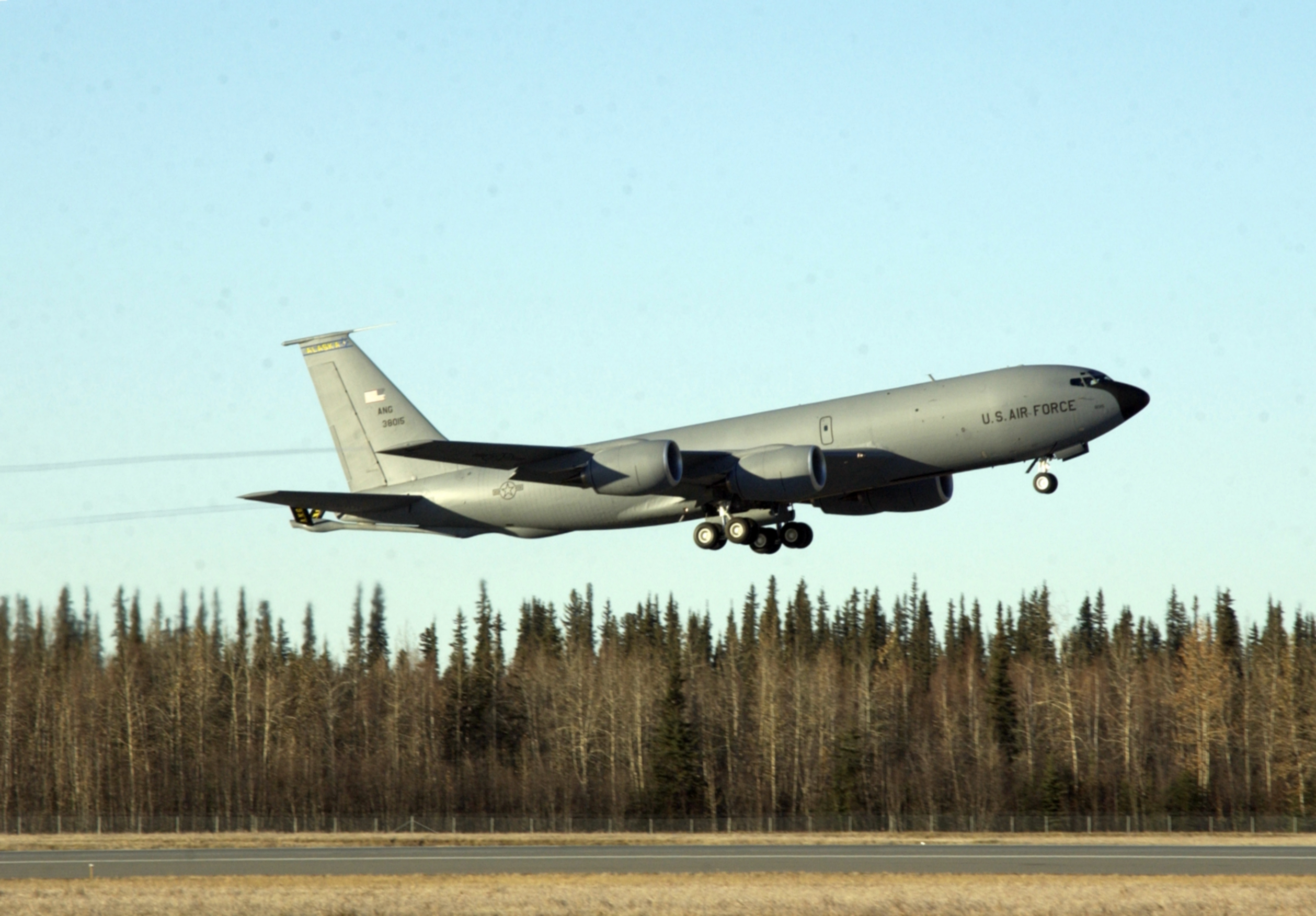
168th Air Refueling Squadron KC-135 taking off from Eielson AFB

Initially formed as the 176th Tactical Airlift Group's Detachment 1, based at Eielson Air Force Base In the spring of 1986, members of the unit – what few there were – began a 17-day tour of other Air National Guard tanker units. This trip had a dual purpose, one of its participants would recount later: "One, conduct interviews and make selection for the jobs ... and two, steal people."

Evidently they were very persuasive, because the new unit was staffed by 16 officers and 65 enlisted personnel by September, when its first planes, four renovated KC-135E Stratotankers, arrived.

Obtained from the Arkansas Air National Guard over vociferous objections from local politicians, the KC-135Es were hand-me-downs, and the 168th's other facilities were antiquated. Despite this, the unit still managed to supply 70 percent of the theater's air refueling training needs in its first six months of operation. Only two years after being activated, its first Unit Effectiveness Inspection resulted in a rare "excellent" rating.

For its first four years of existence, the 168th was assigned to the 176th, which was redesignated the 176th Composite Group in recognition of its newly diversified components. By the end of the decade the 168th had already reached operational maturity. On 1 July 1990, the 168th was authorized to expand to a group level, and the 168th Air Refueling Wing was established by the National Guard Bureau. The 190th ARS becoming the group's flying squadron.

=== Exxon Valdez oil spill ===
In the days after the March 1989 Exxon Valdez oil spill, the 144th flew many sorties delivering oil containment booms, supplies and emergency personnel to Valdez. Air Guard members remained in place in various support roles even after the actual airlift was handed over to civilian contractors. In particular, firefighters from the 176 Civil Engineer Squadron provided crash response and fire protection for the Valdez airport, where traffic had increased from 14 or so flights per day to well over 400.

On a somewhat lighter note came the effort to save a handful of gray whales trapped in the ice near Point Barrow in 1989. Their plight captured the attention of the national media, and the 176th Group was asked to provide logistical support for the rescue attempt. The episode ended, the Airlift reported, with the whales "last seen headed south to vacation in the sun."

=== Combat search and rescue ===
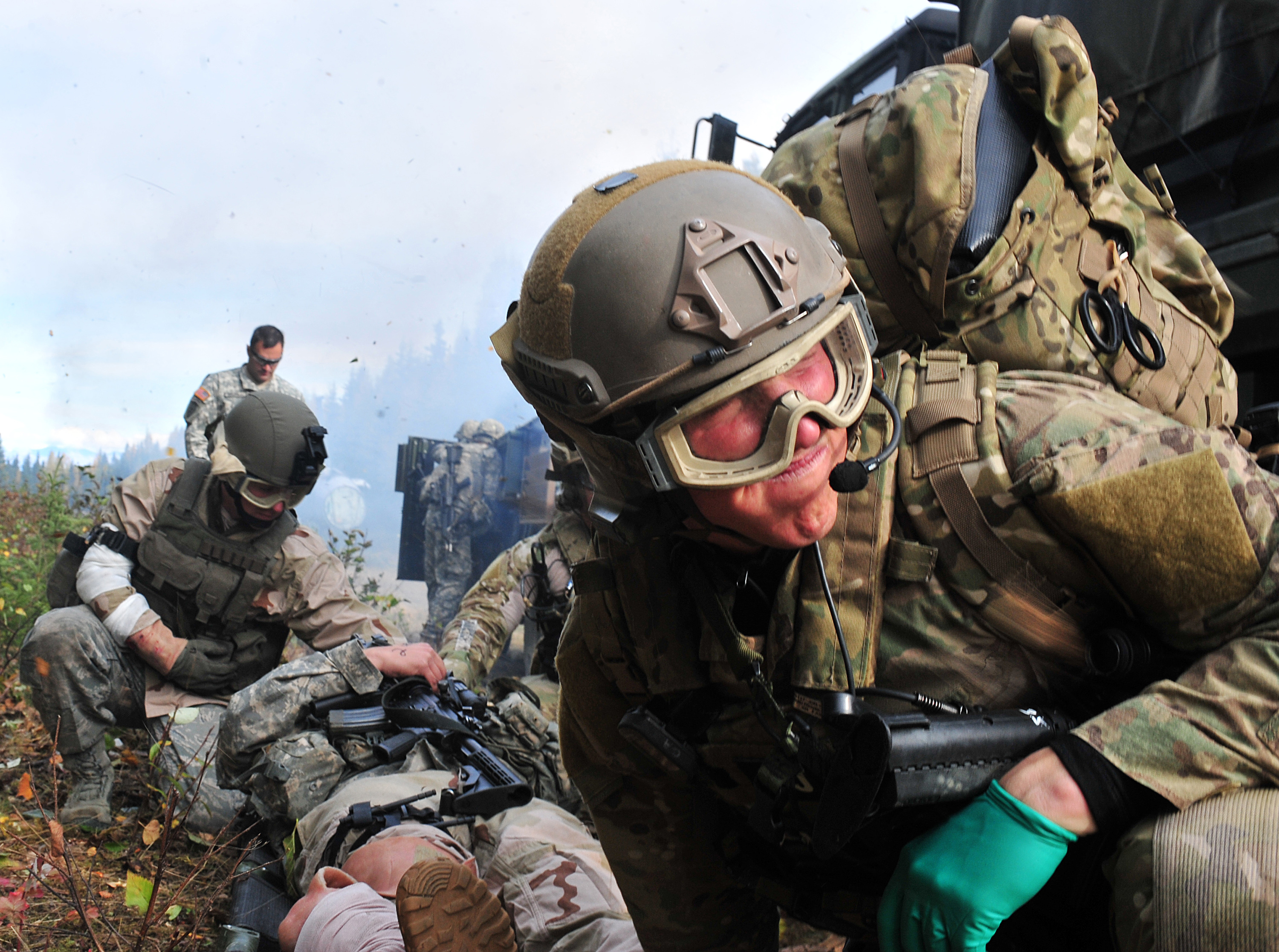
212th Rescue Squadron pararescueman, prepares to move a patient on a litter while the HH-60G Pavehawk helicopter lands during training at Joint Base Elmendorf-Richardson.

In 1987, the Air Force announced the active duty 71st Air Rescue Squadron would be inactivated. However, the tradition of Arctic search and rescue would continue; Alaska Senator Ted Stevens introduced legislation creating a new search and rescue unit for the Alaska Air National Guard. The 210th Air Rescue Squadron received federal recognition from the National Guard Bureau on 4 April 1990 and the unit activation ceremony was held at Kulis Air National Guard Base on 11 August 1990. The 210th ARS was bestowed the lineage, history, honors and colors of the 10th Air Rescue Group, which was formed at Elmendorf Field on 1 April 1946 and was mostly operated by Alaskans.

The 210th took delivery of its new Sikorsky HH-60 Pave Hawk search and rescue helicopters between June and August 1990 and new Lockheed HC-130 search/tanker aircraft in November and December 1990. The unit achieved initial operational capability faster than the normal Air Force programming process normally allows.

On 8 October 2004 by the Air Force Special Operations Command re-organized Air National Guard rescue units and created separate squadrons for fixed-wing, helicopter and pararescue elements of the 210th Rescue Squadron. The HH-60 helicopter flight became 210th Rescue Squadron; the HC-130P Hercules flight become the 211th Rescue Squadron, and the pararescue flight became the 212th Rescue Squadron.

=== Alaska NORAD Region ===
In 2004, the Alaska Air National Guard took over operations of the Alaska NORAD Region (ANR) Regional Operations Control Center (ROCC) from the active-duty 611th Air Control Squadron. Air defense Radar and interceptor units had been operating from Alaska since the early days of the Cold War in 1951, with Alaska Air Command establishing a chain of Aircraft Control and Warning (AC&W) Radar stations to direct interceptor aircraft to unidentified aircraft intruding on Alaskan airspace.

In the CONUS, the air defense mission was transferred to the Air National Guard in 1985, and in Alaska, the USAF 11th Air Force 611th Air Control Squadron began a four-year transition to the Alaska Air National Guard in 2000. On 1 October 2004, the 611th ACS was officially inactivated and the Alaska ANG 176th Air Control Squadron was federally recognized and activated. The 176th ACS was assigned to the 176th Operations Group.

=== Worldwide strategic airlift ===
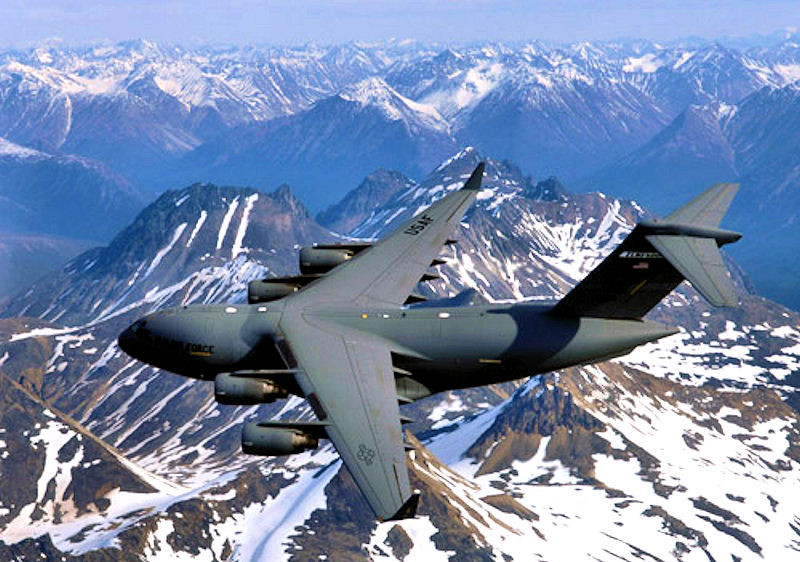
249th Airlift Squadron – Boeing C-17A over the Alaska Range

In association with the USAF 3d Wing, 517th Airlift Squadron at Elmendorf AFB, the 176th Wing began flying a variety of airlift missions with the 517th's C-17 Globemaster III's in mid-summer 2007. These missions were combat missions in support of Operation Iraqi Freedom and Operation Enduring Freedom. This association was formalized in September 2009 when the 249th Airlift Squadron was formed as an associate unit with the 517th AS and received federal recognition and activation.

Its crews continue to mix with crews from the active-duty 517th, flying its eight C-17 Globemaster III jets around the world.

Along with the 249th, the 144th AS performed humanitarian airlift missions for famine relief in Somalia and Rwanda, supported Operation Southern Watch in Saudi Arabia, achieved an Excellent rating in its first Operational Readiness Inspection from PACAF. Aircrews of the 144th, have flown to the far reaches of the globe, performing missions in Panama, Thailand, Japan, Australia and Germany. The unit also participated in Operation Full Accounting, an effort to bring back remains of Americans from Vietnam, Laos and Cambodia.

Recently, the 144th Expeditionary Airlift Squadron was formed and deployed members in support of Operation Enduring Freedom and Operation Iraqi Freedom.

The C-17 mission was transferred to the 144th Airlift Squadron on August 4 2018 with the deactivation of the 249th AS as the 144th AS assumed control of the 249th's C-17 Globemaster III aircraft, shared with the active duty the 517th Airlift Squadron.

=== Elmendorf Air Force Base ===
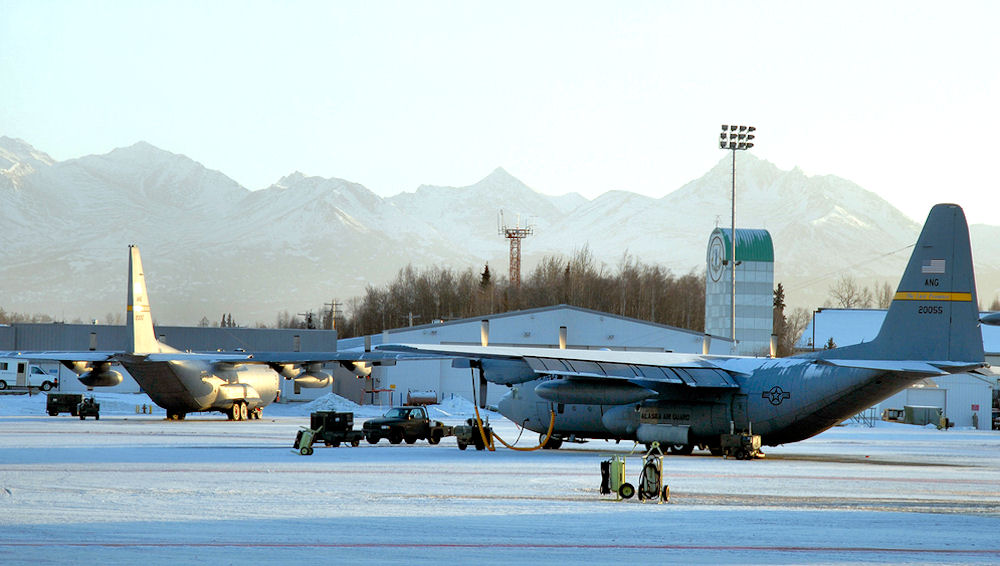
144th Airlift Squadron moving out of Kulis AGB, February 2011.

In 2005, the Base Realignment and Closure Commission recommended that Kulis AGB be closed and the wing be relocated to Joint Base Elmendorf-Richardson (JBER). The move was considered a good fit, given the growing mission of the wing, and the state of Alaska supported the recommendation.

The unit closed Kulis AGB and moved to facilities at JBER in February 2011. The 176th now operates out of a set of new and renovated buildings on JBER in an area known colloquially as Camp Kulis.

=== Lineage ===
- Constituted as the 176th Tactical Airlift Group and allotted to the Air National Guard in 1969

Received federal recognition and activated on 1 April 1969
Redesignated 176th Composite Group on 1 October 1986
Redesignated 176th Group on 1 January 1993
Redesignated 176th Wing on 1 October 1995

=== Assignments ===
- Alaska Air National Guard, 1 April 1969 – present

Gained by: Alaskan Air Command
Gained by: Pacific Air Forces 9 August 1990 – 1 October 1995, individual units gained by various USAF major commands afterwards

=== Components ===
- 176th Operations Group, 1 October 1995 – present
- 144th Tactical Airlift Squadron (later 144th Airlift Squadron)], 1 April 1969 – present
- 168th Air Refueling Squadron, 1 October 1986 – 1 July 1990 (GSU at Eielson AFB)
- 176th Air Control Squadron, 1 October 2004 – present
- 210th Air Rescue Squadron (later 210th Rescue Squadron), 11 August 1990 – present
- 211th Rescue Squadron, 8 October 2004 – present
- 212th Rescue Squadron, 8 October 2004 – present
- 249th Airlift Squadron, 1 September 2009 – 1 August 2018

=== Stations ===
- Kulis Air National Guard Base, Alaska, 1 April 1969 – 12 February 2011
- Joint Base Elmendorf-Richardson, Alaska, 12 February 2011 – present

=== Aircraft ===
- C-123J Provider, 1969–1976
- C-130E Hercules, 1976–1985
- C-130H2 Hercules, 1985–2016
- KC-135E Stratotanker, 1986–1990
- HC-130 Hercules, 1990 – present
- HH-60G Pave Hawk, 1990 – 2026
- C-17 Globemaster III, 2007 – present
- HH-60W Jolly Green II, 2025 – present
