= 210th Rescue Squadron =

210th Rescue Squadron

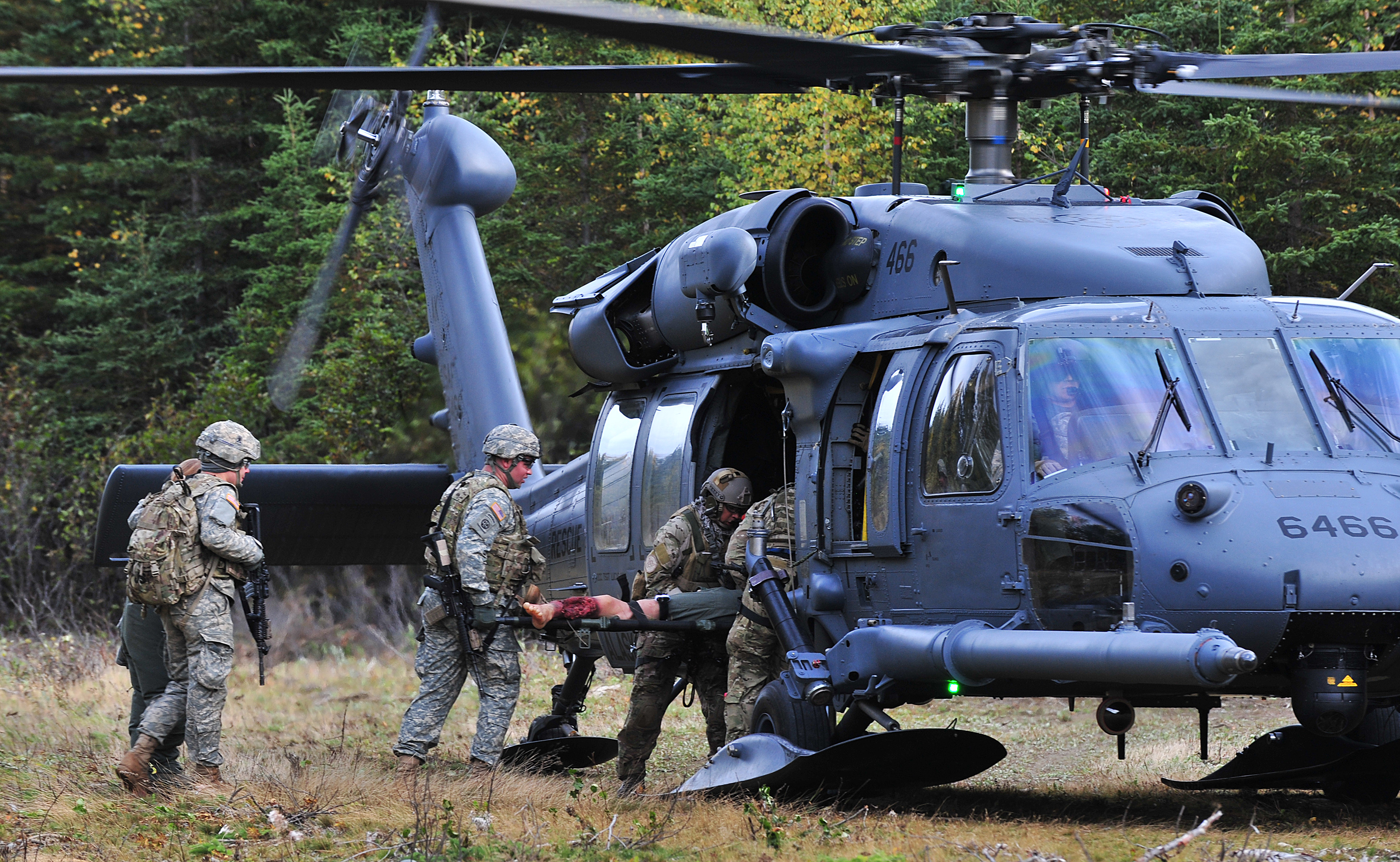
- Pararescuemen and airborne soldiers load a "casualty" into a U.S. Air Force 210th Rescue Squadron HH-60G. (Note: Pararescuement are from the 212th Rescue Squadron and paratroopers from the 3rd Platoon, Company B, 509th Infantry Regiment (Airborne).)
- Active: 1942–1946; 1946–1958; 1990–present
- Country: United States
- Allegiance: Alaska
- Branch: Air National Guard
- Type: Squadron
- Role: Combat search and rescue
- Part of: Alaska Air National Guard
- Garrison/HQ: Joint Base Elmendorf-Richardson, Alaska
- Nickname: The Second 10th
- Motto: These things we do.....That others may live
- Engagements: Asiatic-Pacific Theater

Insignia
- 210th Rescue Squadron emblem

The 210th Rescue Squadron is a unit of the Alaska Air National Guard 176th Wing located at Joint Base Elmendorf-Richardson, Anchorage, Alaska. The 210th is equipped with the HH-60W Jolly Green II helicopter.

== Mission ==
The wartime mission of the 210th is combat search and rescue to locate and recover downed fighter pilots. The day-to day mission is to perform an 11AF 24-hour Alaska Theater Search and Rescue Alert. A by-product of the two missions is civilian search and rescue. The 210th is one of the busiest Air Force combat search and rescue squadrons in the world. with an average of one search and rescue mission a week in addition to regular training and mission. To date, the 210th has launched on over 500 missions resulting in over 300 lives saved and over 100 lives assisted. The 210th Rescue Squadron passed its 310th rescue in 1996.

== History ==
=== 10th Emergency Rescue Boat Squadron ===
The 924th Quartermaster Boat Company was activated at Elmendorf Field in July 1942 to provide rescue coverage for the waters near the field. In July 1944, it was redsignated the 10th Army Air Forces Emergency Rescue Boat Squadron. From November 1944 to December 1945, it served at Adak Army Air Field in the Aleutian Islands. The squadron was inactivated in March 1946.

=== 10th Air Rescue Squadron ===
Nicknamed "The Second 10th", the 210th continues the history of the 10th Air Rescue Squadron (ARS), an active duty squadron organized at Elmendorf Field in 1946 and mostly crewed by Alaskans. During the late 1940s and early 1950s, the 10th operated flights at Elmendorf, Ladd Air Force Base and Naval Air Station Adak. The squadron operated a mixture of OA-10s, OA-12s, SB-17 Flying Fortress, C-45s, L-5s, LC-126As, R-5 Helicopters and CG-4 Gliders.

=== 10th Air Rescue Group ===
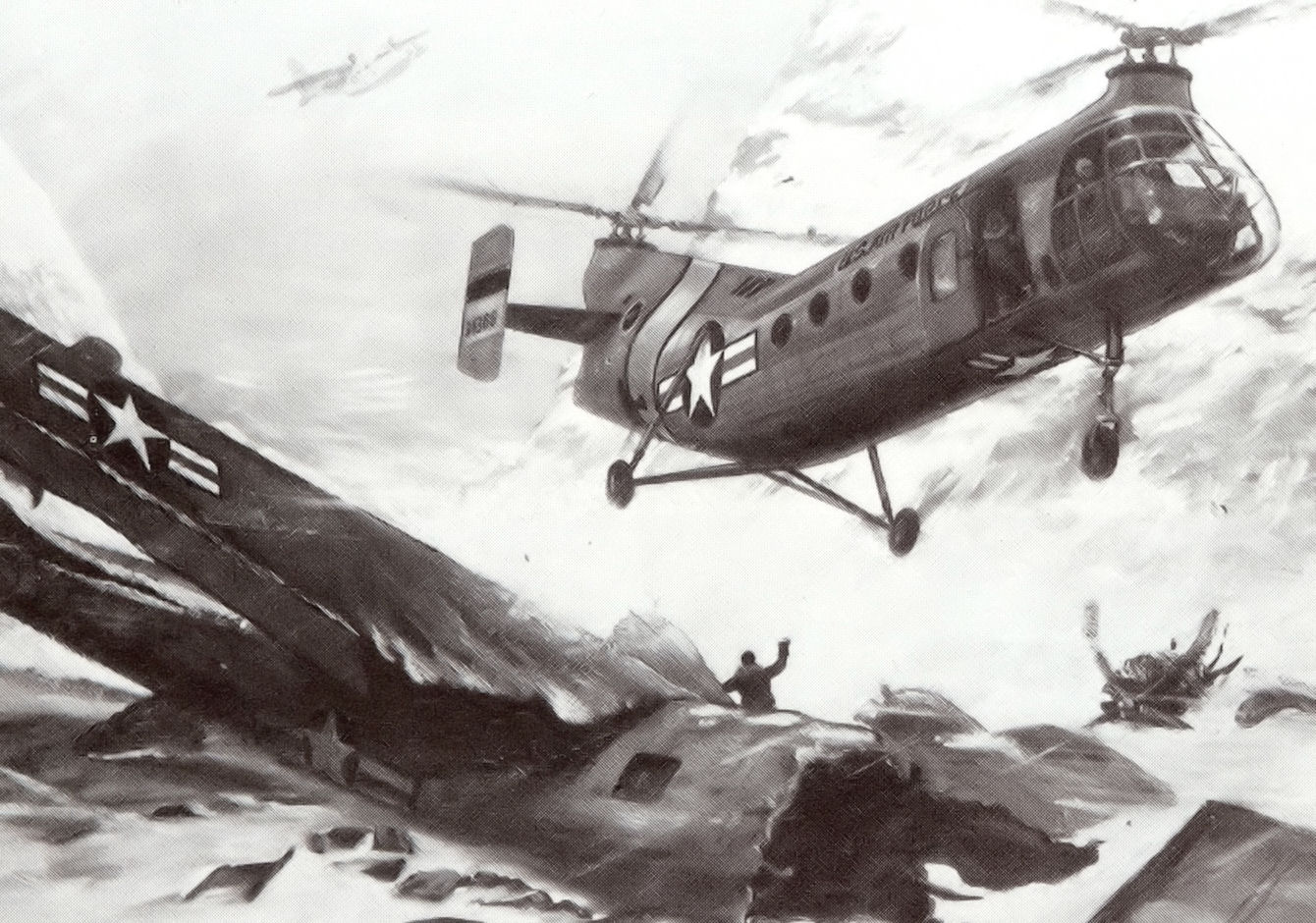
Art depicting a 10th Group SH-21 coming to the assistance of the crew of a TB-29 that crashed in the Talkeetna Mountains on 15 November 1957. (Note: The Boeing TB-29 Superfortress, serial 44-70039 was from the 5040th Radar Evaluation Squadron from Elmendorf north of Anchorage, Alaska. Six crewmembers were killed and four survived, kept alive by the least injured survivor. An SA-16 Orbits overhead, providing communications.)

Expanded into the 10th Air Rescue Group on 14 November 1952, the Air Rescue Service unit expanded its detachments into squadrons. This resulted in the assignment of the 71st and 72d Air Rescue Squadrons at Elmendorf; the [3d Air Rescue Squadron at Adak Naval Station, and the 74th Air Rescue Squadron at Ladd. The 72d and 73d were inactivated in September and November 1953 in response to the withdrawal of Air Force units from the Aleutian Islands.

During this period, the 10th became widely known as "The Guardian of the North" and provided support not only to the military but also to the civilian communities. The group established a pattern that would be followed in the years ahead. A rescue coordination center was maintained at Elmendorf 24/7/365 to coordinate search-and-rescue activities, which included any support given by civilian agencies throughout the territory of Alaska.

The 10th's responsibilities were threefold: search, aid and rescue. The search function was performed by specially equipped aircraft and ground vehicles, as well as dog teams which were used occasionally. Aid was rendered by highly trained paramedics, who were capable of para-rescuing to the rescue scene if necessary. Rescue was carried out by several means, including the use of helicopters, amphibious and conventional aircraft, and surface vehicles. The unit also provided support to the Alaskan Air Command's air defense system.

In 1957, with the steady decline of Alaskan Air Command forces, Headquarters, USAF, questioned the need to continue the group, particularly in the face of budget reductions and the contemplated reduction of search and rescue forces worldwide. The 10th Air Rescue Group was inactivated on 8 January 1958 and its former 71st Air Rescue Squadron was inactivated 18 March 1960. However, the rescue coordination center at Elmendorf was retained and officially designated the Alaskan Command Rescue Coordination Center.

During the 1960s search and rescue activities in Alaska were assigned to the 17th Coast Guard District for offshore and close-to-shore operations. The Alaskan Air Command was assigned everywhere else

=== Transfer of rescue mission to the National Guard ===
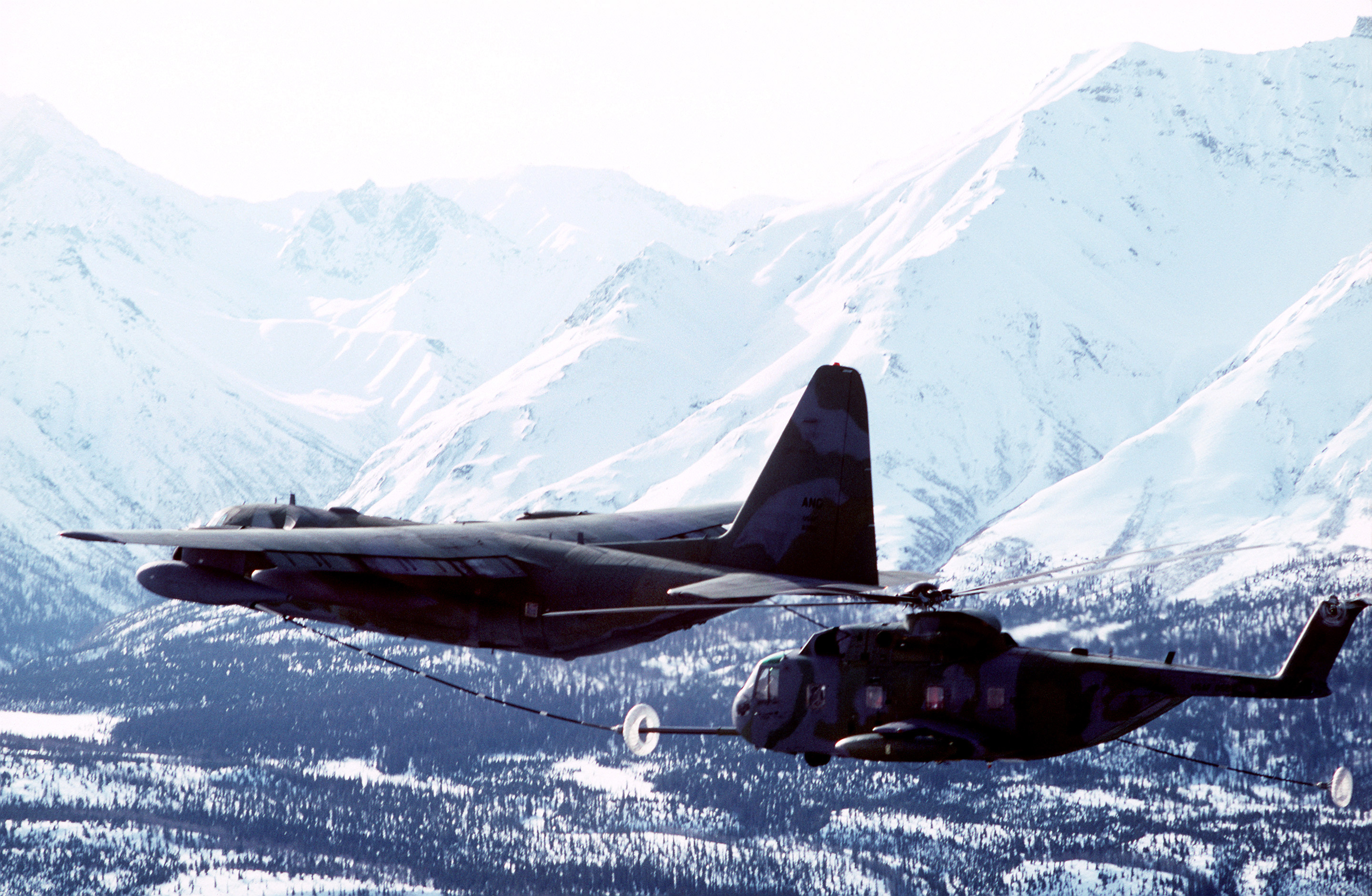
Squadron HC-130(H)Nrefueling a 71st Squadron HH-3E Jolly Green Giant helicopter.

The 71st was reactivated as the 71st Aerospace Rescue and Recovery Squadron in 1970. It served Alaska during the 1970s and 1980s including the rescue of 74 people from the sinking cruiseship MS Prinsendam in the Gulf of Alaska on 4 October 1980.

In 1987, the Air Force announced the 71st would again be inactivated. However, the tradition of Arctic search and rescue would continue; Alaska Senator Ted Stevens introduced legislation creating a new search and rescue unit for the Alaska Air National Guard. The 210th Air Rescue Squadron received federal recognition from the National Guard Bureau on 4 April 1990 and the unit activation ceremony was held at Kulis Air National Guard Base on 11 August 1990. The 210th took delivery of its new Sikorsky HH-60 "Pave Hawk" search and rescue helicopters between June and August 1990 and new Lockheed HC-130 search/tanker aircraft in November and December 1990. The unit achieved initial operational capability faster than the normal Air Force programming process normally allows.

The 210th began sharing the 24 hour Alaska Theater overland helicopter search and rescue alert with the 71st on 1 January 1991 and assumed the entire helicopter alert on 1 April 1991. The HC-130 began daytime alert in April 1991 and assumed 24 hour alert in May 1991. The 71st ARS inactivated on 30 June 1991. In January 1992, the 210th achieved combat-ready status. In 1993, additional aircraft were added to the squadron inventory. On 1 January 1994, Detachment 1, of the squadron was organized at Eielson Air Force Base, Alaska, to perform search and rescue for Eielson-based fighters and to perform logistical range support for the northern military ranges. In early 1995, more new HH-60 aircraft joined the 210th and the original HH-60s were transferred to other units. In 1996, the squadron received new HC-130 aircraft and transferred its original HC-130s to another unit. The 210th possesses state-of-the-art "force multipliers". Its Pararescue officers and men are trained in combat insertion and recovery, including SCUBA and military freefall parachute; all the men are Paramedics and even the officers are Emergency Medical Technicians.

On 8 October 2004 by the Air National Guard reorganized its rescue units and created separate squadrons for fixed-wing, helicopter and pararescue elements of the 210th Rescue Squadron. The HH-60 helicopter flight remained the 210th Rescue Squadron; the HC-130(H)N Hercules flight became the 211th Rescue Squadron, and the pararescue flight became the 212th Rescue Squadron.

== Lineage ==
10th Army Air Forces Emergency Rescue Boat Squadron

- Constituted as the 924th Quartermaster Boat Company, Aviation on 14 June 1942

Activated on 1 July 1942
Redesignated 10th Army Air Forces Emergency Rescue Boat Squadron on 3 July 1944
Inactivated on 8 March 1946
Disbanded on 15 June 1983
Reconstituted on 13 December 1989 and consolidated with the 10th Air Rescue Group as the 210th Aerospace Rescue and Recovery Squadron on 13 December 1989

210th Rescue Squadron

- Constituted as the 10th Air Rescue Squadron and activated on 1 April 1946

Redesignated 10th Air Rescue Group on 14 November 1952
Inactivated on 8 January 1958
Consolidated with the 10th Army Air Forces Emergency Rescue Boat Squadron as the 210th Aerospace Rescue and Recovery Squadron on 13 December 1989 and alotted to the Air National Guard
Redesignated s10th Air Rescue Squadron in 1990
Received federal recognition on 4 April 1990
Redesignated 210th Rescue Squadron on 16 March 1992

=== Assignments ===
- XI Air Force Service Command, 1 July 1942 – 8 March 1946
- Alaskan Air Command, 1 April 1946
- Air Rescue Service, 1 January 1950 – 8 January 1958
- 176th Composite Group (later 176th Group, 11 August 1990
- 176th Operations Group, 1 October 1995 – present

=== Components ===
- 71st Air Rescue Squadron, 14 November 1952 – 8 January 1958
- 72d Air Rescue Squadron, 14 November 1952 – 30 September 1953
- 73d Air Rescue Squadron, 14 November 1952 – 30 November 1953 (GSU at Adak Naval Station, Alaska)
- 74th Air Rescue Squadron, 14 November 1952 – 8 January 1958 (GSU at Ladd Air Force Base, Alaska)

=== Stations ===
- Elmendorf Field, Alaska, 1 July 1942
- Adak Army Air Field, November 1944
- Unknown (Note: Probably Elmendorf Field.), December 1945 – 8 March 1946
- Elmendorf Field (later Elmendorf Air Force Base), Alaska, 1 April 1946 – 8 January 1958
- Kulis Air National Guard Base, Alaska, 11 August 1990
- Joint Base Elmendorf-Richardson, Alaska, 18 February 2011 – present

=== Aircraft ===
- SA-16 Albatross, 1952–1960
- Sikorsky H-5, 1954–1955
- C-54 Skymaster, 1954–1955
- Sikorsky SH-19, 1954–1956
- SC-54 Skymaster, 1955–1958
- SH-21 Shawnee, 1956–1958
- HC-130 Hercules, 1990–2004
- HH-60G Pave Hawk, 1990 – 2026
- HH-60W Jolly Green II, 2025 – present
