= Alaska Air National Guard =

Unit of the US Air National Guard for the State of Alaska

- Emblem of the Alaska Air National Guard
- Active: 15 September 1952 – present
- Country: United States
- Allegiance: Alaska
- Branch: Air National Guard
- Type: State militia, reserve force
- Role: "To meet state and federal mission responsibilities."
- Part of: Alaska National Guard; National Guard Bureau; National Guard
- Garrison/HQ: Alaska Air National Guard, Joint Forces Headquarters, Joint Base Elmendorf-Richardson, Anchorage, Alaska, 81657
- Website: https://ak.ng.mil/Careers/Alaska-Air-National-Guard/

Commanders
- Civilian leadership: President Donald Trump (Commander-in-Chief); Troy Meink (Secretary of the Air Force); Governor Mike Dunleavy (Governor of the State of Alaska)
- State military leadership: Brigadier General Brian D. Kile

Aircraft flown
- Reconnaissance: HH-60G
- Transport: C-130, C-17, KC-135, HC-130

The Alaska Air National Guard (AK ANG) is the aerial militia of the State of Alaska, United States of America. It is, along with the Alaska Army National Guard, an element of the Alaska National Guard.

As state military units, the units in the Alaska Air National Guard are not typically in the normal United States Air Force chain of command unless federalized. They are under the jurisdiction of the governor of Alaska though the office of the Alaska Adjutant General unless they are federalized by order of the president of the United States. The Alaska Air National Guard is headquartered at Joint Base Elmendorf–Richardson and its commander is Brigadier General Scott A. Howard.

As of 2025, the Alaska Air National Guard is composed of 1,676 Air Guardsmen.

== Overview ==
Under the "Total Force" concept, Alaska Air National Guard units are considered to be Air Reserve Components (ARC) of the United States Air Force (USAF). Alaska ANG units are trained and equipped by the Air Force and are operationally gained by a major command of the USAF if federalized. In addition, the Alaska Air National Guard forces are assigned to Air Expeditionary Forces and are subject to deployment tasking orders along with their active duty and Air Force Reserve counterparts in their assigned cycle deployment window.

Along with their federal reserve obligations, as state military units the elements of the Alaska ANG are subject to being activated by order of the governor to provide protection of life and property, and preserve peace, order and public safety. State missions include disaster relief in times of earthquakes, hurricanes, floods and forest fires, search and rescue, protection of vital public services, and support to civil defense.

== Components ==
The Alaska Air National Guard consists of the following major units:

- 168th Wing

Established 1 October 1986 (as: 168th Air Refueling Squadron); operates: KC-135R Stratotanker
Stationed at: Eielson Air Force Base, Fairbanks
Gained by: Pacific Air Forces
The 168th ARW is the only Arctic region refueling unit in the United States and maintains a substantial number of personnel on active duty and civilian technician status in order to meet its daily operational requirements. The unit transfers more fuel than any other Air National Guard tanker wing, because nearly all receivers are active duty aircraft, many of which are on operational missions.

- 176th Wing

Established 15 September 1952 (as: 8144th Air Base Squadron)
Stationed at: Joint Base Elmendorf-Richardson, Anchorage

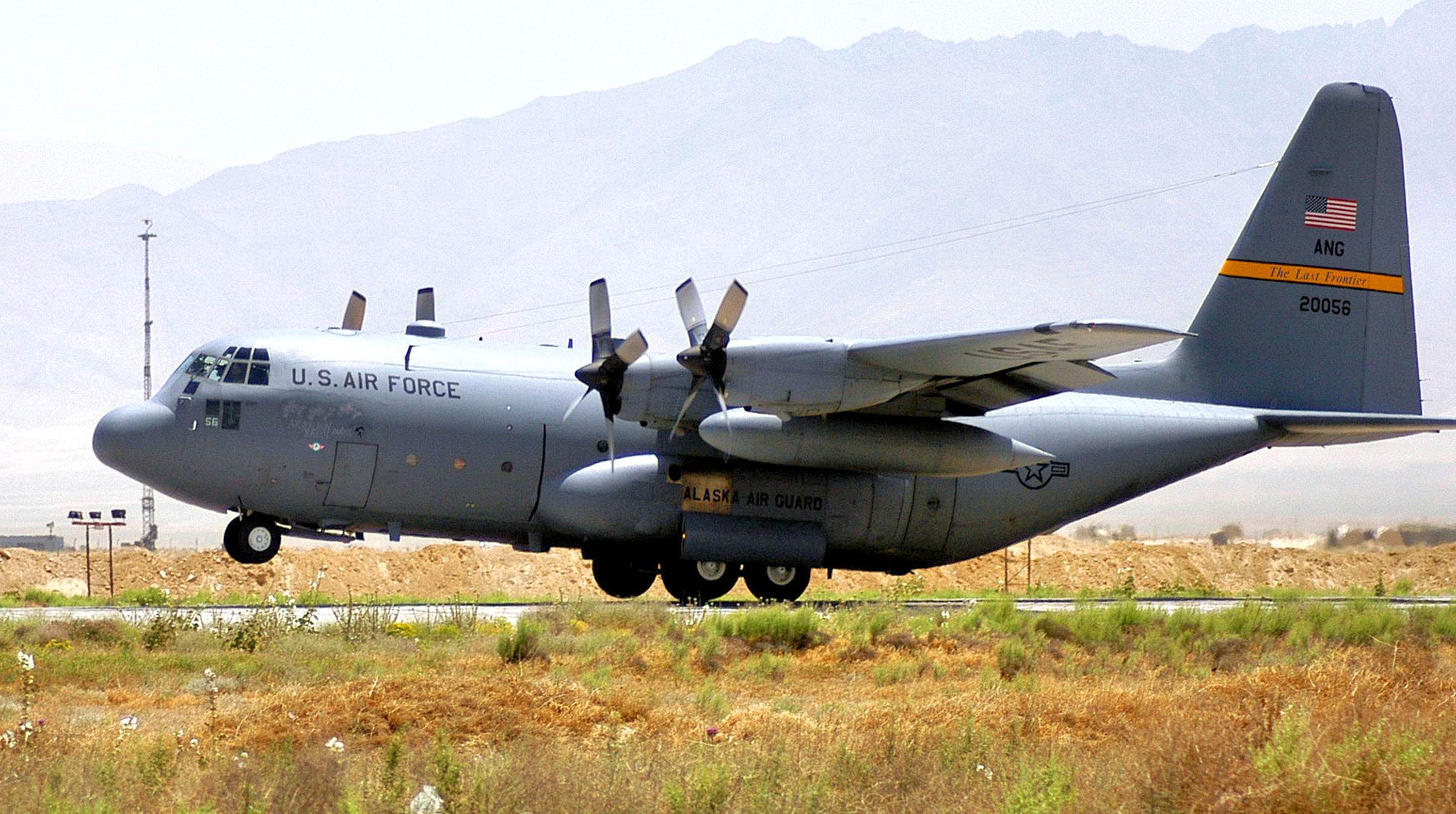
C-130 Hercules from the 144th Airlift Squadron takes off from Bagram Airfield, Afghanistan, 2012.

Components gained by: Air Combat Command, Air Mobility Command, Air Force Special Operations Command
The 176th Wing is the largest unit of the Alaska Air National Guard. It is a composite wing with multiple missions, including global airlift, air-sea rescue, tactical airlift, and NORAD air defense.

Support Unit Functions and Capabilities:

- 213th Space Warning Squadron (213 SWS), Geographically Separated Unit (GSU) located at Clear Space Force Station, Anderson, Denali Borough.

Located 40 miles (64 km) north of Denali and 80 miles (130 km) south of Fairbanks. The 213th SWS is responsible for providing tactical warning and attack assessment of a ballistic missile attack against the continental United States and southern Canada. Warning data from the unit is forwarded to the North American Aerospace Defense Command inside Cheyenne Mountain Space Force Station, Colorado.

== History ==
The Alaska Air National Guard was formed in Anchorage in July 1952 when Major General Earl T. Ricks of the National Guard Bureau announced that the territorial government of Alaska was willing to invest $1.5 million to establish an Air National Guard unit in Anchorage, either at the city's international airport or on Elmendorf Air Force Base. The only condition: that enough people could be recruited to man the unit.

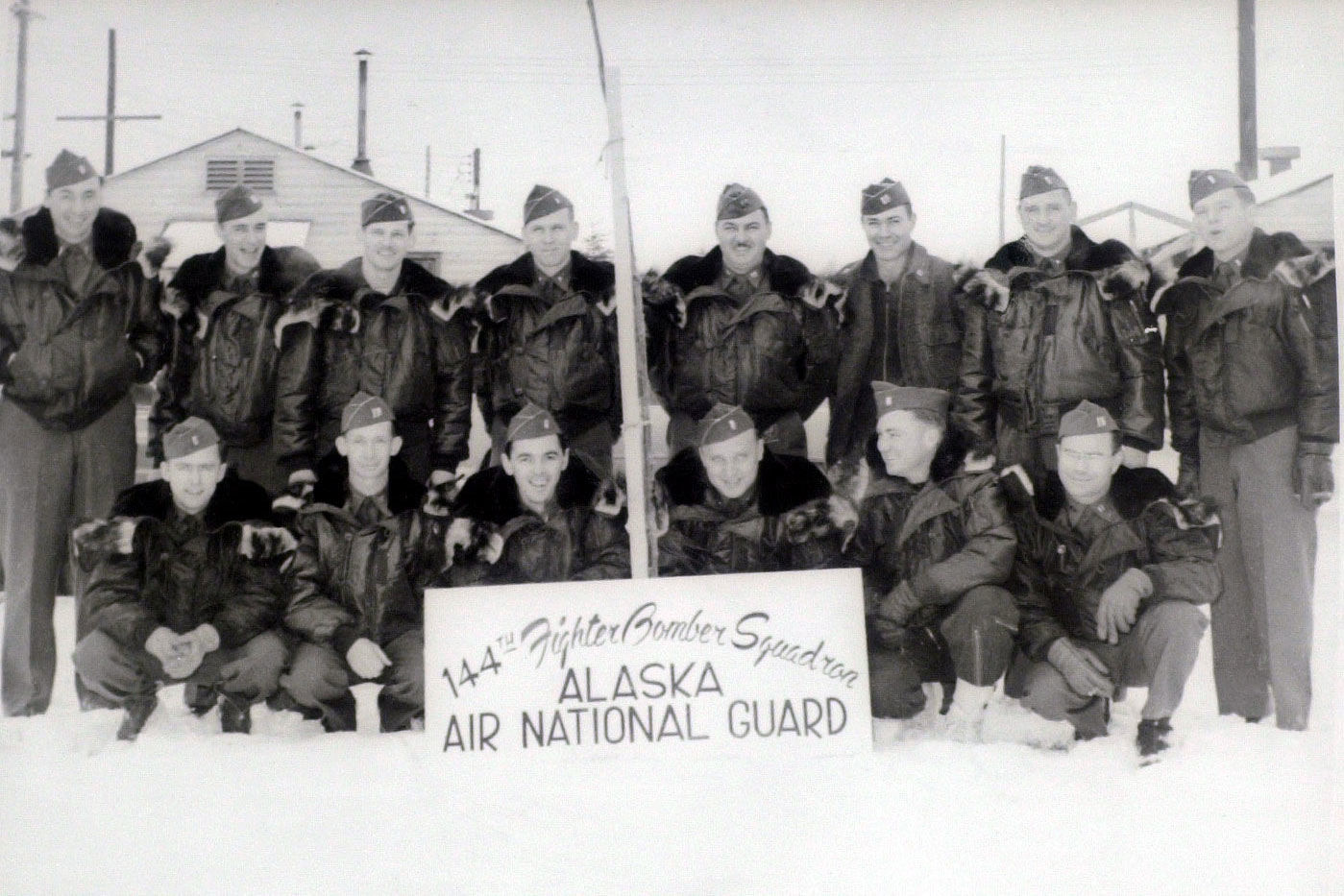
Members of the newly designated 144th Fighter-Bomber Squadron posing for a picture during the winter of 1953

The Alaska Air National Guard was organized 15 September 1952 as the 8144th Air Base Squadron. At its creation, the 8144th included 11 enlisted men and five officers. It had no planes. Its headquarters were located in a small office above what was then the bus depot on Fourth Avenue in Anchorage. Because the office was so small, the men convened for their first training assembly in a nearby Quonset hut.

The unit's first aircraft, a 1941 T-6 Texan trainer arrived in February 1953. Soon five more trainers arrived, operating out of Elmendorf AFB Hangar #3. In keeping with the Air Guard's mission to provide national air defense, the pilots began training in earnest for their planned transition to jet fighters. The unit was re-designated as the 144th Fighter-Bomber Squadron on 1 July 1953.

In 1969, the 144th Tactical Airlift Squadron (TAS) was authorized to expand to a group level, and the 176th Tactical Airlift Group (176th TAG) was established by the National Guard Bureau. The 176th TAG received federal recognition and was activated on 1 April 1969. The 144th TAS was assigned as the new unit's operational squadron.

In 1986 the 168th Fighter-Interceptor Squadron designation was transferred from the Illinois ANG to the Alaska Air National Guard. It was re-designated as the 168th Air Refueling Squadron, extended federal recognition and reactivated on 1 October 1986. The 168th would operate as a geographically separated unit (GSU), at Eielson Air Force Base, Fairbanks. It was equipped with Boeing KC-135E Stratotankers to refuel military aircraft over Alaska and the northern Pacific Region.

In 1987, the Air Force announced the 71st Aerospace Rescue and Recovery Squadron would be inactivated. The 71st ARRS had a history dating to 1946 as the 10th Air Rescue Squadron (ARS), an active duty squadron organized at Elmendorf Field and mostly composed of Alaskans. However, the tradition of Arctic search and rescue would continue; Alaska Senator Ted Stevens introduced legislation creating a new search and rescue unit for the Alaska Air National Guard. The 210th Air Rescue Squadron received federal recognition from the National Guard Bureau on 4 April 1990 and the unit activation ceremony was held at Kulis Air National Guard Base on 11 August 1990.

After the September 11 attacks, elements of every Air National Guard unit in Alaska has been activated in support of the global war on terrorism. Flight crews, aircraft maintenance personnel, communications technicians, air controllers and air security personnel were engaged in Operation Noble Eagle air defense overflights of major United States cities. Also, Alaska ANG units have been deployed overseas as part of Operation Enduring Freedom in Afghanistan and Operation Iraqi Freedom in Iraq as well as other locations as directed.

In 2004, the 176th Air Control Squadron was formed to operate the Alaska NORAD Region (ANR) Regional Operations Control Center (ROCC). Maintains 24-hour-a-day, seven-day-a-week capability to detect, validate and warn of any atmospheric threat to North American air sovereignty. The Alaska ANG unit's legacy dates to September 1951 when the first Alaskan Air Command Aircraft Control and Warning ground control interceptor radar sites were established at Murphy Dome AFS, near Fairbanks and Fire Island AFS near Anchorage were completed and became operational.

In 2007, the newest unit of the Alaska ANG was formed when the 249th Airlift Squadron was federally recognized in Anchorage. The 249th's mission is strategic airlift. Its crews mix with crews from the active-duty Air Force 3d Wing, 517th Airlift Squadron to fly eight C-17 Globemaster III jets around the world.

In 2010, the traditional home of the Alaska ANG in Anchorage, Kulis Air National Guard Base, was closed as a result of BRAC 2005. The 176th Wing at Kulis AGB moved to Joint Base Elmendorf-Richardson (in an area now known colloquially as Camp Kulis) in February 2011. The property thereafter reverted to ownership by the State of Alaska, which as of April 2011 had not yet announced plans for the property.

== See also ==
- Alaska Naval Militia
- Alaska State Defense Force
- Alaska Wing Civil Air Patrol
