= Kulis Air National Guard Base =

Former Alaska Air National Guard Base at Ted Stevens International Airport

Kulis Air National Guard Base
- Part of Alaska Air National Guard
- Ted Stevens International Airport, Anchorage, Alaska.
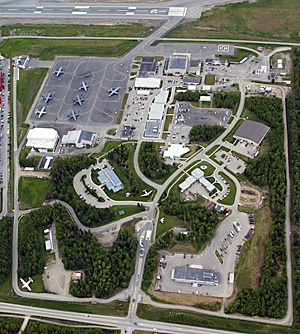
- Aerial photo of Kulis Air National Guard Base

Site information
- Owner: State of Alaska
- Condition: Closed

Location
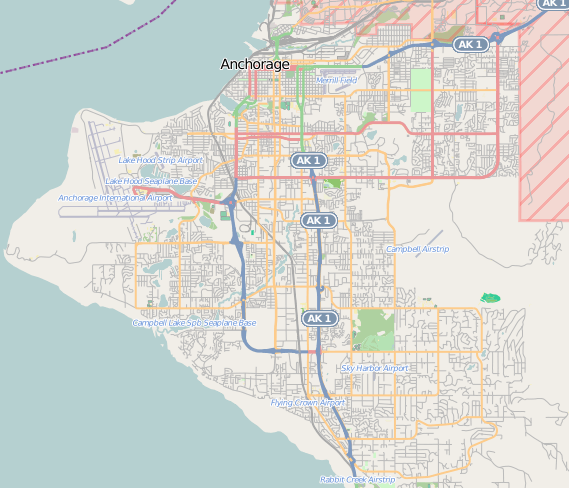
- Coordinates: 61°09′47″N 149°58′19″W

Site history
- Built: 1955
- In use: 1955-2011

Garrison information
- Garrison: Alaska Air National Guard

Kulis Air National Guard Base was a National Guard of the United States facility in Anchorage, Alaska. The 127-acre (51 ha) facility adjacent to and south of Ted Stevens International Airport was home to the 176th Wing of the Alaska Air National Guard until that unit moved to Joint Base Elmendorf-Richardson (in an area now known colloquially as Camp Kulis) in February 2011. The property thereafter reverted to ownership by the State of Alaska.

== History ==
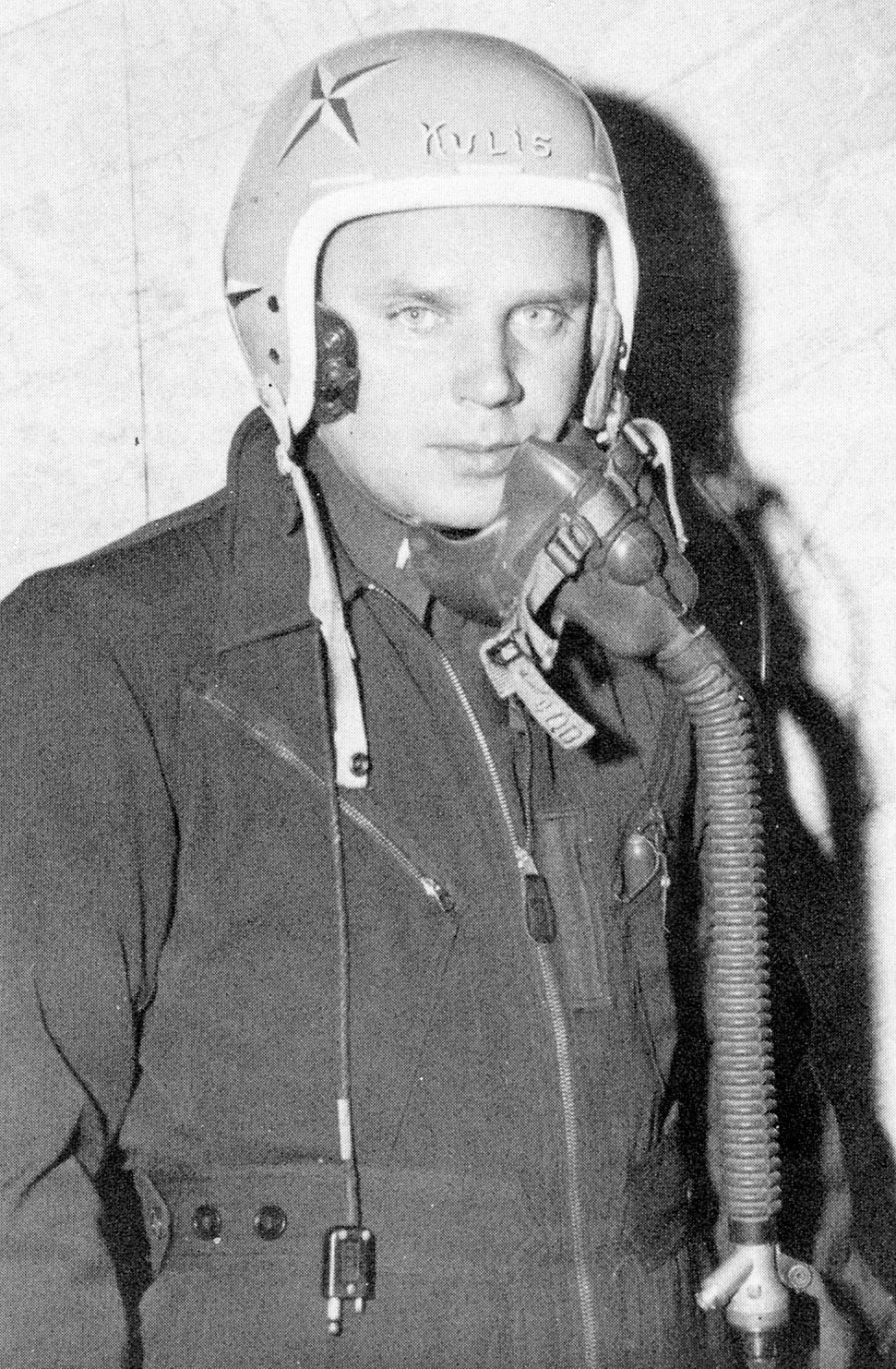
First Lieutenant Albert Kulis

Kulis AGB is named in honor of First Lieutenant Albert Kulis. During a training flight on 14 November 1954 a formation of three F-80Cs led by Lt. Kulis passed in formation over the Goose Bay area, on the west side of Knik Arm. His wing man watched as Lt. Kulis' fighter went into a steep, diving turn and vanished into a cloudbank. Two weeks later, wreckage belonging to the jet was found in the mud at Goose Bay, but sank before it could be recovered.

The base opened during the spring of 1955 with the 144th Fighter-Bomber Squadron. After an informal vote among squadron members, the base was named after Lt. Kulis.

Kulis served as a major center for the coordination of disaster relief in the aftermath of the March 27, 1964 Good Friday earthquake. Guard members quickly converted a base warehouse into a shelter for civilians rendered homeless by the quake with a makeshift dining hall and more than 100 beds. By midnight of that day, 97 of the beds were filled.

Kulis would reprise this role less than six years later, when the Chena River overflowed its banks, causing a devastating flood in downtown Fairbanks in August 1967. Within five hours of the first call for assistance, the first of many C-123 Provider flights began ferrying disaster relief supplies to Fairbanks, and evacuating area residents to Anchorage. Evacuees received food, shelter and medical attention at Kulis; others were housed at the Alaska National Guard's Camp Carroll, on Fort Richardson. Over the next nine days the Kulis-based 144th Air Transportation Squadron (Medium) would fly 138 sorties with its C-123s and a C-54 Skymaster transport, carrying 2,371 people and more than 300,000 pounds (140,000 kg) of supplies.

Kulis received a major upgrade in 1977. More than $3 million was invested in a new composite maintenance building, an aerospace ground equipment support building and a new petroleum operations facility on base.

In 1990 Kulis became host to an additional squadron, as the 176th Wing added the 210th Rescue Squadron with six HH-60 Pave Hawk helicopters and four HC-130s—a specialized combat search-and-rescue variant of the C-130.

== Closure ==
In 2005, the Base Realignment and Closure (BRAC) Commission listed Kulis as one of the bases recommended for closure.

In 2011, the 176th Wing vacated Kulis ANGB for new quarters on Joint Base Elmendorf-Richardson, north of Anchorage. As noted above, the property now belongs to the State of Alaska. The state is seeking to lease the property.

== See also ==
- 176th Wing
- Alaska Air National Guard
- Camp Kulis
