= List of United States Air Force rescue squadrons =

This article is a list of United States air force rescue squadrons both active, inactive, and historical. A rescue squadron's main task is to provide both combat, and peacetime search and rescue operations. Which involve the search for and the provision of aid to those in danger or distress, in combat the role may overlap somewhat with casualty evacuation operations.

== Air Rescue Squadrons ==
| Squadron | Emblem | Location | Notes |
|---|---|---|---|
| 1st Air Rescue Squadron | | | |
| 2d Air Rescue Squadron | | | |
| 3d Air Rescue Squadron | | | |
| 4th Air Rescue Squadron | | | |
| 7th Air Rescue Squadron | | | |
| 9th Air Rescue Squadron | | | |
| 10th Air Rescue Squadron | | | |
| 26th Air Rescue Squadron | | | |
| 27th Air Rescue Squadron | | | |
| 28th Air Rescue Squadron | | Ramey AFB | |
| 29th Air Rescue Squadron | | Kindley AFB, Bermuda | |
| 33d Air Rescue Squadron | | Naha Air Base, Okinawa | |
| 34th Air Rescue Squadron | | | |
| 46th Air Rescue Squadron | | Otis AFB | |
| 49th Air Rescue Squadron | | | |
| 57th Air Rescue Squadron | | Lajes Field | |
| 62d Air Rescue Squadron | | Stead AFB Nevada | |
| 64th Air Rescue Squadron | | Norton AFB | |
| 65th Air Rescue Squadron | | Nellis AFB | |
| 76th Air Rescue Squadron | | Hickam AFB Hawaii | inactivated |
| 81st Air Rescue Squadron | | | |
| 2157th Air Rescue Squadron | | K-16, Korea | |
| 2190th Air Rescue Squadron | | | |
| Eastern Air Rescue Center | | Robins AFB | |
| Central Air Rescue Center | | Richards-Gebaur AFB | |
| Western Air Rescue Center | | Hamilton AFB | |

37 Air Rescue and Recovery Squadron || Kirkland AFB

== Arctic Search and Rescue Squadrons ==
| Squadron | Emblem | Location | Notes |
|---|---|---|---|
| 1st Arctic Search and Rescue Squadron | | Bluie West One | Constituted and activated on 25 Jun 1943 at Buckley Field. |
| 2d Arctic Search and Rescue Squadron | | Buckley Field | Constituted and activated on 18 Sep 1943. |
| 3d Arctic Search and Rescue Squadron | | Buckley Field | Constituted and activated on 18 Sep 1943. |

== Rescue Flights (RF) ==
| Squadron | Shield | Location | Motto | Supported Unit |

5th Crash Rescue Flight Johnston Island Korean War 1950/1951

== Expeditionary Rescue Squadrons (ERQS) ==
| Squadron | Shield | Current Location | Equipment | Supported Unit | Wing | Notes |
|---|---|---|---|---|---|---|
| 26th Expeditionary Rescue Squadron | Lightning; Bolts | Muwaffaq Salti Air Base | HC-130J | 1st Expeditionary Rescue Group | 332nd Air Expeditionary Wing | Previously at Camp Bastion until 1 January 2014. |
| 46th Expeditionary Rescue Squadron | | Muwaffaq Salti Air Base | HH-60G | 1st Expeditionary Rescue Group | 332nd Air Expeditionary Wing | Previously at Camp Bastion until 30 January 2013 (451 AEW). |
| 52d Expeditionary Rescue Squadron | Owl | Muwaffaq Salti Air Base | Pararescue Jumpers | 1st Expeditionary Rescue Group | 332nd Air Expeditionary Wing | Previously at Diyarbakır Air Base |
| 59th Expeditionary Rescue Squadron | | N/A | HH-60 | | | Previously at Kandahar Airfield until Feb 2013 (451 AEW). |
| 64th Expeditionary Rescue Squadron | Palm; Trees | N/A | HH-60G | 1st Expeditionary Rescue Group | | Previously at Joint Base Balad then Diyarbakır Air Base |
| 81st Expeditionary Rescue Squadron | | Camp Lemonnier | HC-130 | CJTF-HOA | | |
| 82nd Expeditionary Rescue Squadron | | Camp Lemonnier | Pararescue Jumpers | CJTF-HOA | | |
| 83d Expeditionary Rescue Squadron | | N/A | CH-47 (U.S. Army) | | 455th Air Expeditionary Wing | Formerly used HH-60G's (USAF) until October 2017. Previously at Bagram Airfield |
| 303rd Expeditionary Rescue Squadron | | Camp Lemonnier | HH-60W Jolly Green II | CJTF-HOA | 449th Air Expeditionary Group | Previous RQS at Portland ANGB, Oregon |

== Rescue Squadrons (RQS) ==
| Squadron | Shield | Location | Motto | Supported Unit | Notes |
|---|---|---|---|---|---|
| 8th Emergency Rescue Squadron | | Camp Carson | | | |
| 31st Rescue Squadron | | Kadena AB | Vigilance and Honor | | |
| 33d Rescue Squadron | | Kadena AB | | | |
| 36th Rescue Squadron | | Fairchild AFB | "That Others May Live" | | |
| 38th Rescue Squadron | | Moody AFB | "PJs" | activate PJ squadron at immediate| | |
| 39th Rescue Squadron | | Patrick Space Force Base | "Kings" | Air Force Reserve repeat to nearest loc squad rescue for lost civil at marine loc Pismo | |
| 41st Rescue Squadron | | Moody AFB | "Jolly Green" | | |
| 48th Rescue Squadron | | Davis-Monthan AFB | "Move the World" | | |
| 55th Rescue Squadron | | Davis-Monthan AFB | "We Come in the Dark" | | |
| 56th Rescue Squadron | | Aviano Air Base, Italy | | | |
| 57th Rescue Squadron | | Aviano Air Base, Italy | | | |
| 58th Rescue Squadron | | Nellis AFB | | | |
| 66th Rescue Squadron | | Nellis AFB | | | |
| 71st Rescue Squadron | | Moody AFB | "Kings" | | |
| 79th Rescue Squadron | | Davis-Monthan AFB | | | |
| 101st Rescue Squadron | | Francis S. Gabreski ANGB | "Servare Vitam" (To Save Lives) | NY ANG | |
| 102d Rescue Squadron | | Francis S. Gabreski ANGB | "That Others May Live" "ANG’s Oldest Unit" | NY ANG | |
| 103d Rescue Squadron | | Francis S. Gabreski ANGB | "We're all Mad... You know!" | NY ANG | |
| 129th Rescue Squadron | | Moffett Federal Airfield | | CA ANG | |
| 130th Rescue Squadron | | Moffett Federal Airfield | | CA ANG | |
| 131st Rescue Squadron | | Moffett Federal Airfield | | CA ANG | |
| 210th Rescue Squadron | | Joint Base Elmendorf–Richardson | "Second to None" | AK ANG | |
| 211th Rescue Squadron | | Joint Base Elmendorf–Richardson | | AK ANG | |
| 212th Rescue Squadron | | Joint Base Elmendorf–Richardson | | AK ANG | |
| 301st Rescue Squadron | | Patrick Space Force Base | "Guardian Wings" | Air Force Reserve | |
| 303d Rescue Squadron | | Portland Air National Guard Base | "Serviens Ut Servet" (Serving To Save) | Air Force Reserve | Inactivated 2003, Reactivated ERQS 2011 |
| 304th Rescue Squadron | | Portland Air National Guard Base | "Non Pro Se Sed Aliis" (These Things We Do, That Others May Live) | Air Force Reserve | |
| 305th Rescue Squadron | | Davis-Monthan AFB | "Anytime, Anywhere" | Air Force Reserve | |
| 306th Rescue Squadron | | Davis-Monthan AFB | "That Others May Live" | Air Force Reserve | |
| 308th Rescue Squadron | | Patrick Space Force Base | "Ut Ali Vivant" | Air Force Reserve | |
| 449th Rescue Squadron | | | | | |
| 512th Rescue Squadron | | Kirtland AFB | "Jolly" | Training | |

== Aerospace Rescue and Recovery Squadrons ==
| Squadron | Shield | Location | Motto | Supported Unit |
|---|---|---|---|---|
| 37th Aerospace Rescue and Recovery Squadron | | | | |
| 40th Aerospace Rescue and Recovery Squadron | | | | |
| 42nd Aerospace Rescue and Recovery Squadron | | | | |

== See also ==
- Air Rescue Service
- List of United States Air Force squadrons
