= Ahmad al-Jaber Air Base =

Airport in Kuwait

- قاعدة أحمد الجابر الجوية
- Ahmadi Governorate in Kuwait
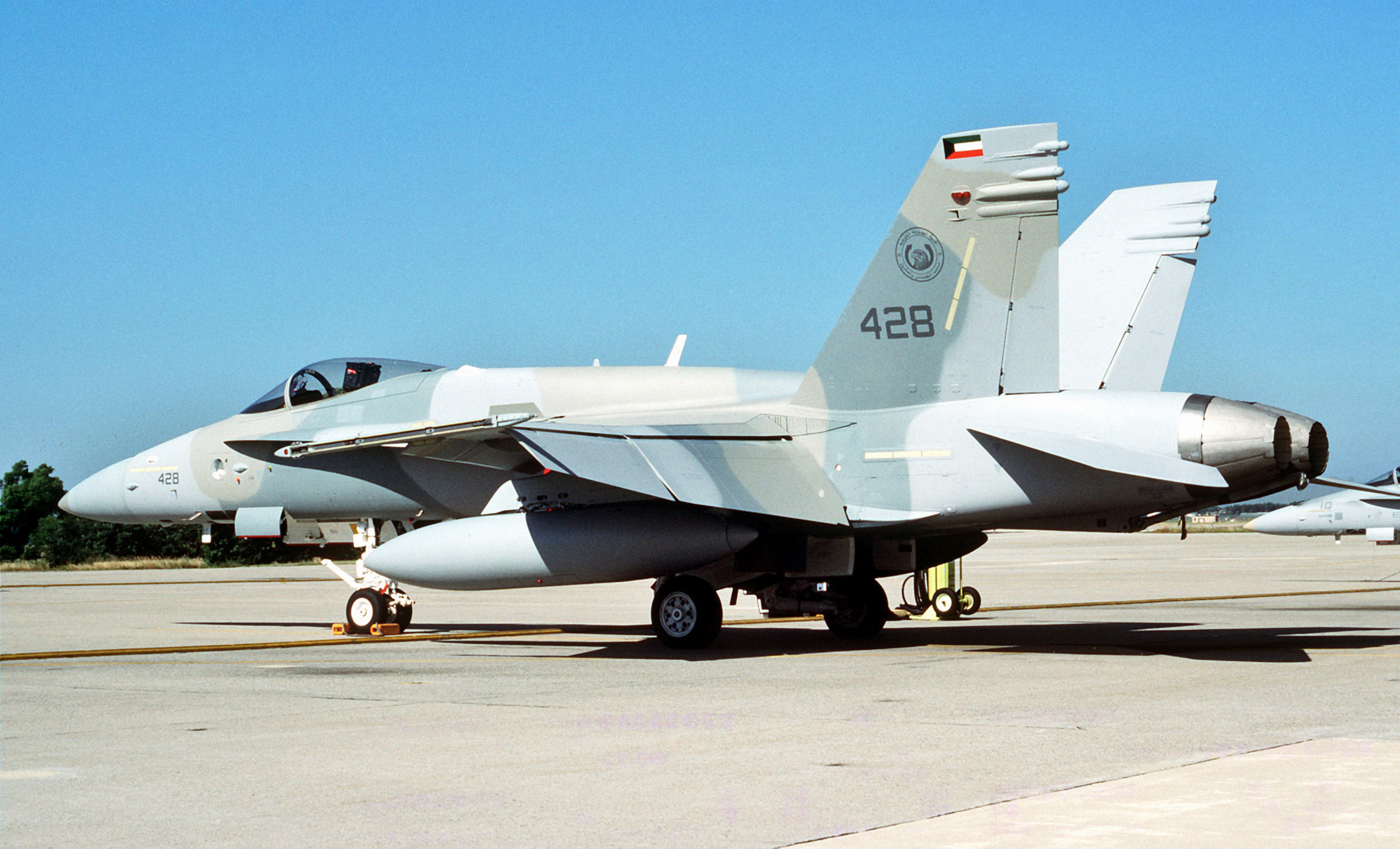
- A Kuwait Air Force KAF-18C Hornet of the type based at Ahmad al-Jaber AB.

Site information
- Type: Kuwait Air Force base
- Owner: Ministry of Defense
- Operator: Kuwait Air Force
- Condition: Operational

Location
- Location in Kuwait
- Coordinates: 28°56′05.7″N 47°47′31.1″E

Garrison information
- Garrison: Fighter Squadrons (Kuwait Air Force); 332nd Air Expeditionary Wing (US Air Force)

Airfield information
- Identifiers: IATA: XIJ, ICAO: OKAJ
- Elevation: 124 metres (407 ft) AMSL
Runways
Direction	Length and surface
15L/33R	3,000 metres (9,843 ft)
15R/33L	3,000 metres (9,843 ft)

Ahmad al-Jaber Air Base (IATA: XIJ, ICAO: OKAJ) is a Kuwait Air Force base that is home to 3 Kuwait Air Force F/A-18 C/D squadrons: 9 Squadron, 25 Squadron, and 61 Squadron. The base also has an area designated for operations by the U.S. Air Force and its allies.

== History ==
=== Invasion of Kuwait ===
When Iraq launched the 1990 invasion of Kuwait, Iraqi Air Force jets dropped air-scattered mines, preventing operations on the runways. This led to the Kuwaiti Air Force Mirage F1s and A-4 Skyhawks having to land on a road nearby.

=== Lead up to the Gulf War ===
After the invasion, the US, which was preparing for Operation Desert Storm, feared that al-Jaber housed Iraqi chemical weapons mainly because the Iraqi army had deployed 30 howitzers and used the Kuwaiti hardened concrete hangars at al-Jaber for munitions storage. These howitzers, known as GHN-45, were notable for being preferred for chemical munition delivery by the Iraqis.

=== 1991 Gulf War ===
During the 1991 Gulf War, coalition aircraft attacked Ahmad al-Jaber Airbase several times due to the chemical munitions storage rumors. They also dropped anti-personnel mines to impede base operations. On the first night of the war at around 4:00 AM, three A-6E TRAM Intruders from VA-115 Eagles (Carrier Air Wing 5) based on the USS Midway attacked the airbase with six Mk.83 bombs each. Later that morning at 8:50 AM, 12 French Air Force SEPECAT Jaguars from EC 2/11 Vosges attacked Al-Jaber with no less than four aircraft sustaining damage (three were hit by IR-SAMs and one by small arms fire) although all returned safely.

As of 2022, satellite images show aircraft Hardened aircraft shelters (HAS) still unrepaired throughout the air base

=== Post War use ===
On 1 December 1998, the 4406th Operations Group (Provisional) at Al-Jaber Air Base was inactivated and the 332nd Air Expeditionary Group activated. Sitting 75 miles south of the Iraqi border, the base has supported active duty United States Air National Guard and Air Force Reserve Fairchild Republic A-10 Thunderbolt II and General Dynamics F-16 Fighting Falcon fighter units, along with support individuals, rotated in and out. At Al-Jaber AB, the 332 ELS Commander and 10 personnel were on one-year tours; all others (1190 personnel) rotated every 90 to 120 days.

According to USA Today, on 22 October 2003, the US Ambassador to Kuwait, Richard Jones, announced that the United States was reducing its presence at Al-Jaber to fully reduce its forces at that location. USAF assets remaining in Kuwait are primarily stationed at Ali Al Salem Air Base.

The U.S. side of the base was re-opened around July 2010 in support of Operation New Dawn.

The U.S. side of the base was re-opened in 2014 sometime before October.

From 22 November 2014 four Panavia Tornados from 6º Stormo of the Italian Air Force deployed there for an unknown amount of time along with a Boeing KC-767A from 14º Stormo.

Between 15 October 2014 and 30 September 2015, the Royal Danish Air Force deployed seven F-16AM Fighting Falcons with four being operational and three others in a reserve capacity.

== Role and operations ==
=== Kuwait Air Force ===
The base is home to the Kuwait Air Force's entire fighter/attack aircraft fleet. Two front-line (9 Squadron and 25 Squadron) and one training unit (61 Squadron) operate a fleet of McDonnell Douglas KAF-18C/D Hornets. The aircraft is a twin-engine, supersonic, all-weather, multirole combat jet, designed as both a fighter and attack aircraft.

=== Military intervention against ISIL ===
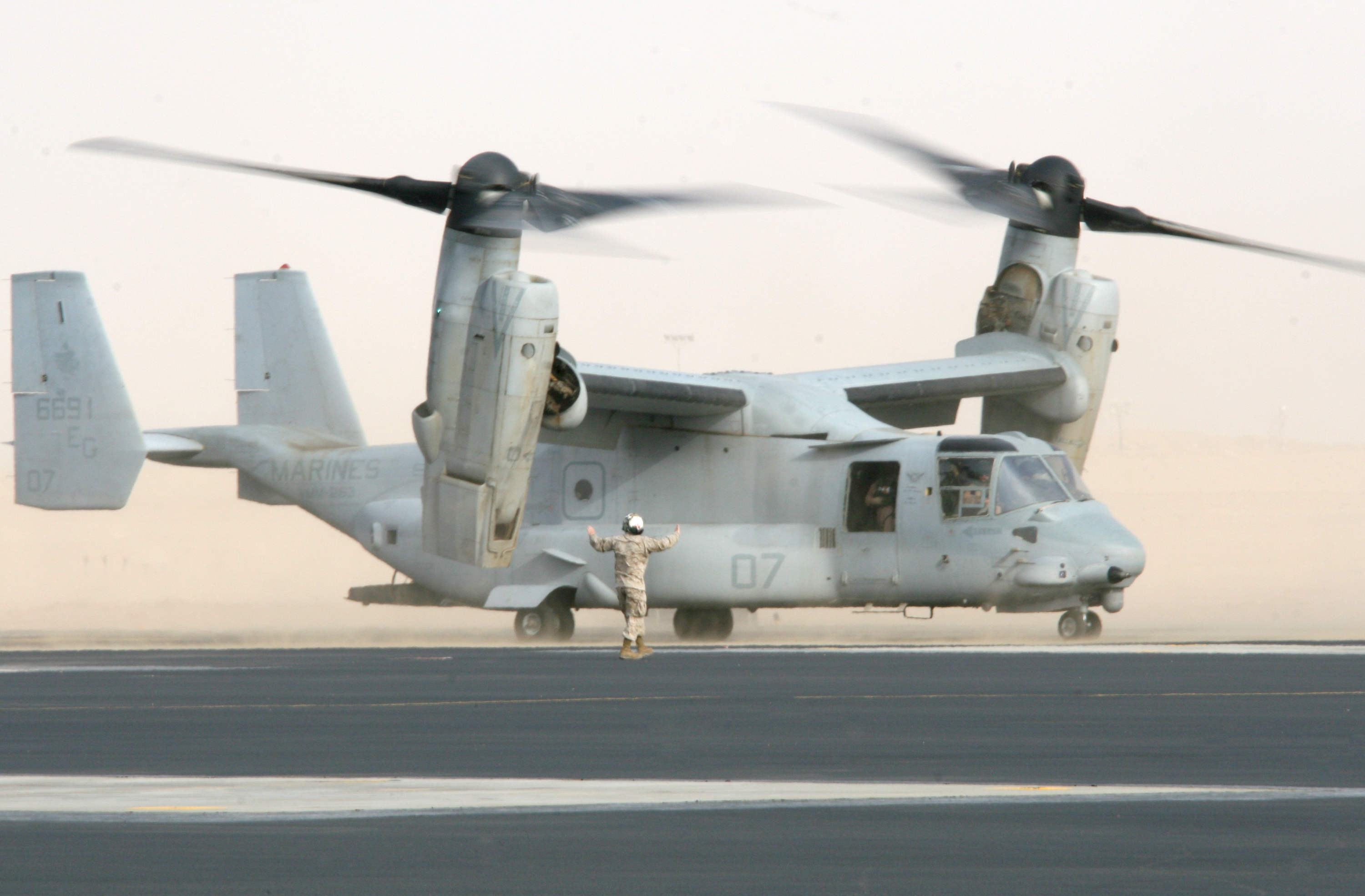
A MV-22B Osprey of the type which has been operated by the United States Marines from Ahmad al-Jaber Air Base.

Ahmad al-Jaber hosts the United States Air Force's 332nd Air Expeditionary Wing (332 AEW), which moved to the base in May 2016. The 332 ARW provides a wide range combat capabilities including aerial-refueling, Intelligence, Surveillance, and Reconnaissance (ISR), space, combat search and rescue (CSAR), and precision strike, all in support of the military intervention against ISIL/ISIS (known by the US military as Operation Inherent Resolve) and wider military operations in the Middle East. A wide range of US Air Force aircraft have been deployed at Ahmad al-Jaber, including F-15E Strike Eagle, MQ-9A Reaper, and KC-135R Stratotanker as well as HH-60G Pave Hawk helicopters. The United States Marines has also operated from the base, flying the MV-22B Osprey, EA-6B Prowler, AV-8B Harrier II and KC-130J Hercules.

== Based units ==
Notable units based at Ahmad al-Jaber Air Base.

=== Kuwait Air Force ===
- 9th Fighter & Attack Squadron – KAF-18C/D Hornet
- 25th Fighter & Attack Squadron – KAF-18C/D Hornet
- 61st Fighter & Attack Squadron – KAF-18C/D Hornet

=== United States Air Force ===
Air Combat Command

- US Air Forces Central Command
  - 332nd Air Expeditionary Wing

== See also ==
- Ahmad Al-Jaber Al-Sabah
