= Burton M. Field =

United States Air Force general

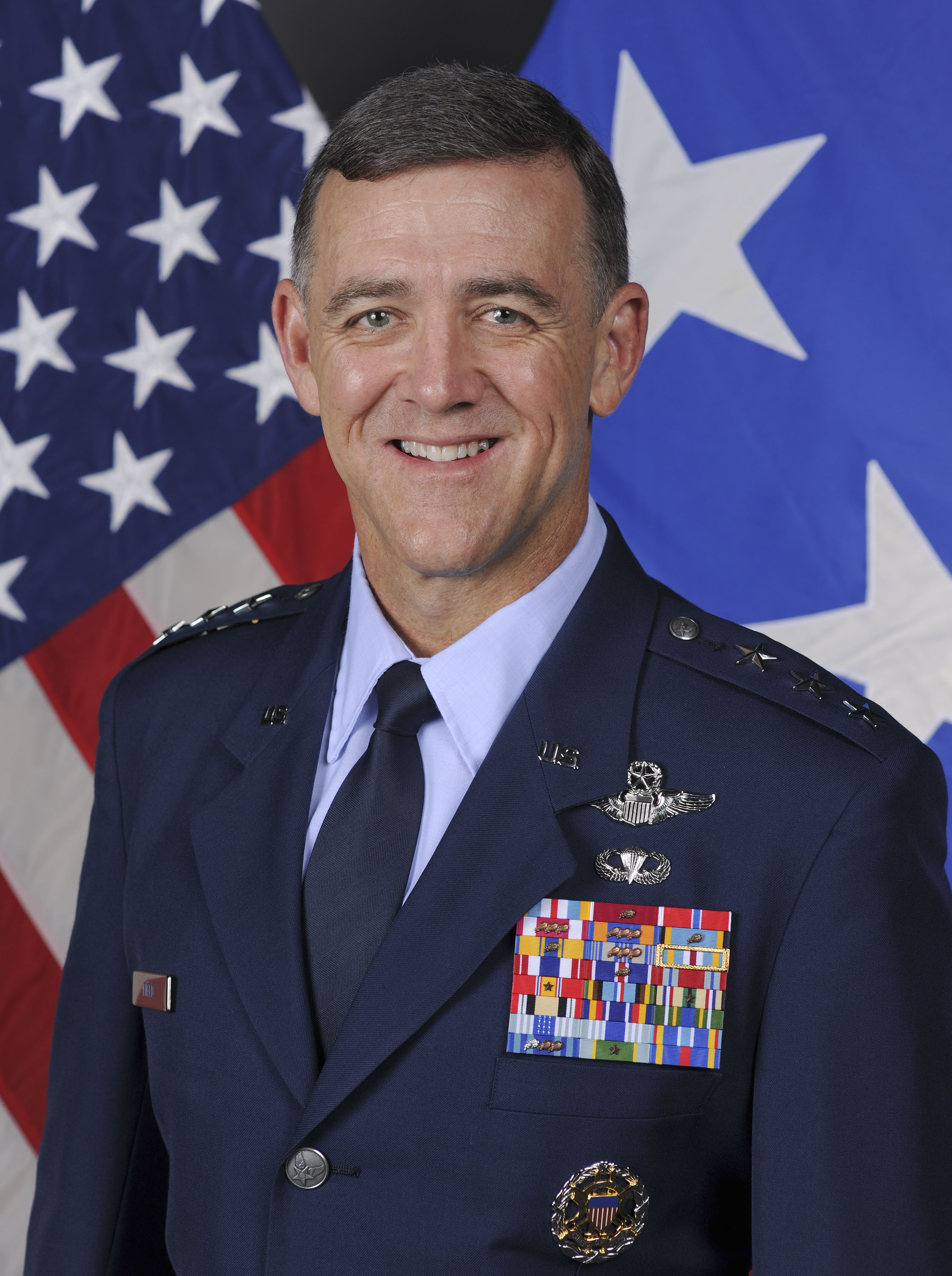
- Military career
- Allegiance: United States
- Branch: United States Air Force
- Service years: 1979–2015
- Rank: Lieutenant general
- Commands: United States Forces Japan; Fifth Air Force; 332d Air Expeditionary Wing; 1st Fighter Wing; 8th Fighter Wing; USAF Weapons School; 421st Fighter Squadron
- Conflicts: Iraq War
- Awards: Air Force Distinguished Service Medal; Defense Superior Service Medal; Legion of Merit (2); Bronze Star Medal

Burton M. Field is a retired United States Air Force lieutenant general. Prior to retirement he served as the deputy chief of staff for operations, plans and requirements, Headquarters United States Air Force.

== Military career ==
Field was commissioned in 1979 after graduating from the United States Air Force Academy with a Bachelor of Science. He has commanded the 421st Fighter Squadron at Hill Air Force Base, Utah; the USAF Weapons School at Nellis AFB; the 8th Fighter Wing at Kunsan Air Base, South Korea; and the 1st Fighter Wing at Langley AFB. He also deployed as Commander, 332d Air Expeditionary Wing, Balad AB, Iraq. Field served on two major command staffs as well as the Joint Staff. He was also the Senior Military Adviser to the United States Special Representative for Afghanistan/Pakistan, the Pentagon, Washington, D.C.

Field is a command pilot with more than 3,400 flying hours in the F-16 and F-22. He completed the USAF Fighter Weapons Instructor Course in 1985, a Master of Business Administration from Golden Gate University in 1986, the 1993 Command and General Staff College in 1993, and graduated from the Air War College in 1998.

== Assignments ==
- July 1979 – July 1980, student, undergraduate pilot training, Williams AFB, Arizona
- October 1980 – May 1981, student, F-16 Replacement Training Unit, Hill AFB, Utah
- May 1981 – December 1983, F-16 squadron pilot and instructor pilot, 430th Tactical Fighter Squadron, Nellis AFB, Nevada
- January 1984 – December 1984, F-16 instructor pilot, 80 TFS, Kunsan AB, South Korea
- January 1985 – May 1985, student, USAF Fighter Weapons Instructor Course, Nellis AFB, Nev
- May 1985 – May 1987, weapons and tactics officer and F-16 instructor pilot, 430th Tactical Fighter Squadron, Nellis AFB, Nevada
- May 1987 – July 1990, F-16 instructor pilot, academic instructor and flight commander, USAF Fighter Weapons School, Nellis AFB, Nevada
- August 1990 – June 1992, advanced medium-range air-to-air missile and F-22 action officer, Tactical Air Command, Langley AFB, Virginia
- June 1992 – June 1993, student, Army Command and General Staff College, Fort Leavenworth, Kansas
- July 1993 – June 1994, chief of standardization and evaluation, 388th Fighter Wing Hill AFB, Utah
- June 1994 – June 1995, operations officer, 34th Fighter Squadron, Hill AFB, Utah
- June 1995 – July 1997, commander of 421st Fighter Squadron, Hill AFB, Utah
- August 1997 – June 1998, student, Air War College, Maxwell AFB, Alabama
- July 1998 – May 2000, executive officer to commander of U.S. Air Forces in Europe, Ramstein AB, Germany
- May 2000 – April 2001, commandant, USAF Weapons School, Nellis AFB, Nevada
- May 2001 – May 2002, commander of 8th Fighter Wing, Kunsan AB, South Korea
- June 2002 – May 2003, assistant deputy director, Political-Military Affairs for Europe (J-5), the Joint Staff, Washington D.C.
- June 2003 – June 2005, deputy director, Politico-Military Affairs for Western Hemisphere (J-5), the Joint Staff, Washington, D.C.
- June 2005 – May 2007, commander of 1st Fighter Wing, Langley AFB, Virginia
- July 2007 – July 2008, commander, 332d Air Expeditionary Wing, Balad Air Base, Iraq
- July 2008 – February 2009, vice director for strategic plans and policy, Joint Staff, the Pentagon, Washington, D.C.
- February 2009 – October 2010, senior military adviser to the U.S. Special Representative for Afghanistan/Pakistan, the Pentagon, Washington, D.C.
- October 2010 – July 2012, commander of U.S. Forces Japan, and Commander, 5th Air Force, Pacific Air Forces, Yokota Air Base, Japan
- July 2012 – present, Deputy Chief of Staff for Operations, Plans and Requirements, Headquarters U.S. Air Force, Washington, D.C.

== Awards and decorations ==
| US Air Force Command Pilot Badge |
| Basic Parachutist Badge |
| Office of the Joint Chiefs of Staff Identification Badge |

| Air Force Distinguished Service Medal |
| Defense Superior Service Medal |
| Legion of Merit with one bronze oak leaf cluster |
| Bronze Star Medal |
| Meritorious Service Medal with three bronze oak leaf clusters |
| Air Medal with three bronze oak leaf clusters |
| Aerial Achievement Medal with oak leaf cluster |
| Air Force Commendation Medal with oak leaf cluster |
| Air Force Achievement Medal with three oak leaf clusters |
| Joint Meritorious Unit Award |
| Air Force Meritorious Unit Award |
| Air Force Outstanding Unit Award with oak leaf cluster |
| Combat Readiness Medal |
| National Defense Service Medal with one bronze service star |
| Armed Forces Expeditionary Medal |
| Southwest Asia Service Medal with service star |
| Iraq Campaign Medal |
| Global War on Terrorism Service Medal |
| Korea Defense Service Medal |
| Air Force Overseas Short Tour Service Ribbon |
| Air Force Overseas Long Tour Service Ribbon |
| Air Force Expeditionary Service Ribbon |
| Air Force Longevity Service Award with one silver and two bronze oak leaf clusters |
| Small Arms Expert Marksmanship Ribbon with service star |
| Air Force Training Ribbon |
