= 41st Rescue Squadron =

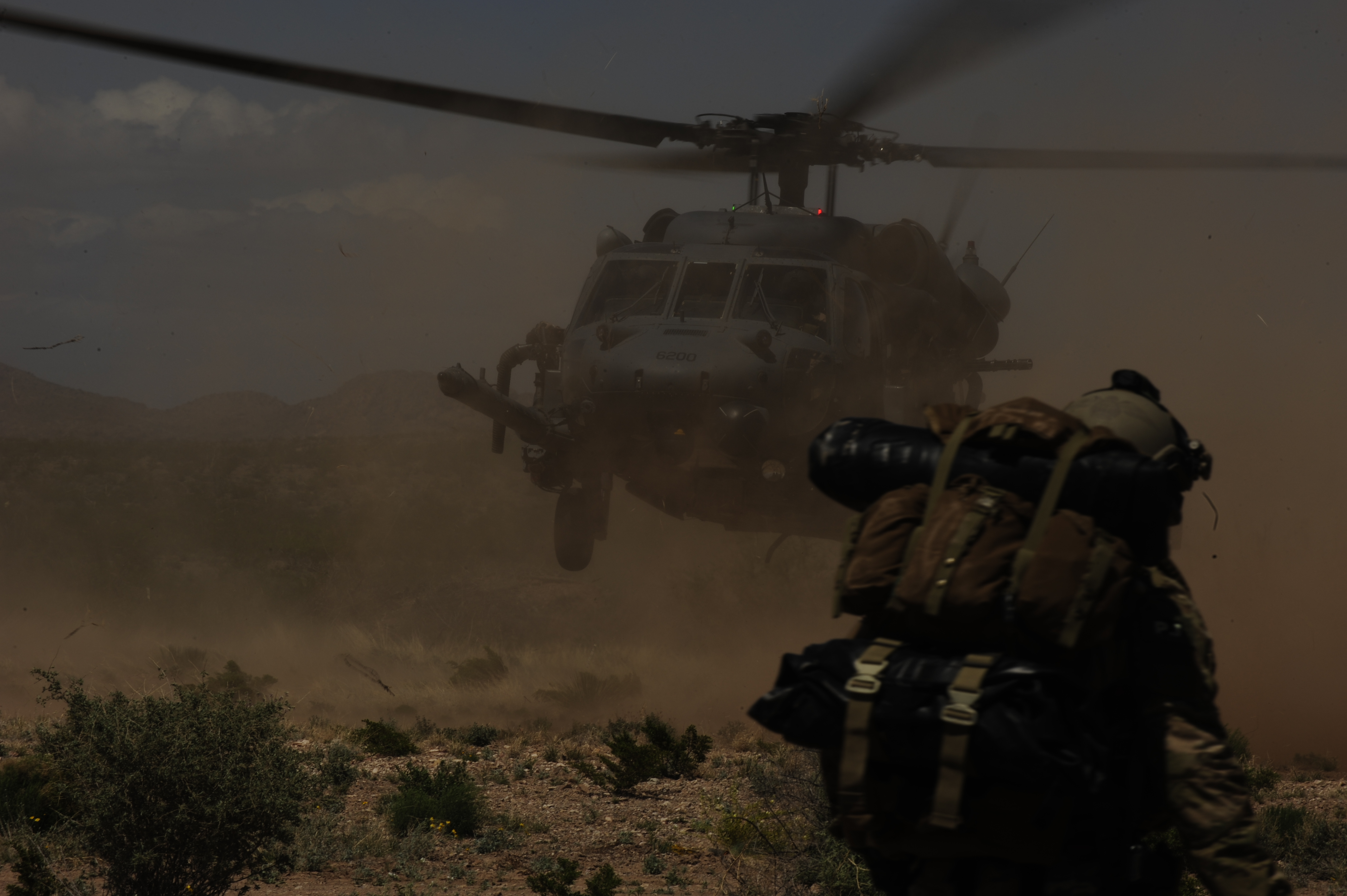
- A Pave Hawk of the 41st landing during a training exercise at the Playas Training and Research Center in April 2010
- Active: 1952–1960; 1961–1987; 1989–present
- Country: United States
- Branch: United States Air Force
- Type: Helicopter
- Role: Search and rescue
- Part of: Air Combat Command
- Garrison/HQ: Moody Air Force Base
- Motto: That Others May Live
- Equipment: HH-60W Jolly Green II
- Engagements: Kosovo War; War in Afghanistan
- Decorations: Air Force Meritorious Unit Award Coast Guard Meritorious Unit Commendation Air Force Outstanding Unit Award with Combat "V" Device Air Force Outstanding Unit Award

Insignia
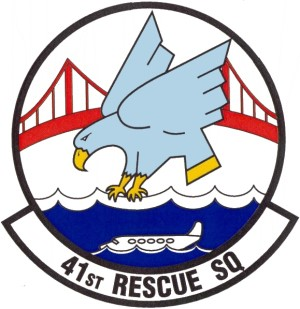
- 41st Rescue Squadron emblem (approved 24 May 1954)

The 41st Rescue Squadron is part of the 347th Rescue Group at Moody Air Force Base, Georgia. It operates HH-60W Jolly Green II aircraft conducting search and rescue missions.

== Mission ==
The 41st Rescue Squadron maintains combat-ready status as an HH-60W combat search and rescue (CSAR) squadron. This squadron specializes in combat rescue of downed aircrew behind enemy lines, using night vision goggles (NVG), low-level formation, air refueling, weapons employment, medevac, casevac, CAS (close air support) and survivor recovery. Air Force rescue is one of the few USAF assets that directly support combat units of all military branches, including allied combat units, through means other than munition drops, or intel. Members assigned to this squadron rapidly mobilize, deploy and employ to provide combat and peacetime search and rescue in support of U.S. national security interests. The 41st also supported launch operations for the NASA Space Shuttle when that program was active. During forward combat operations the 41st, like other USAF helicopter Rescue assets, assume an Alert posture. With an average response time of 4 minutes from call to airborne, the "Pedros" (deployed callsign) are considered by many to be the fastest rescue asset in the United States military inventory.

== History ==
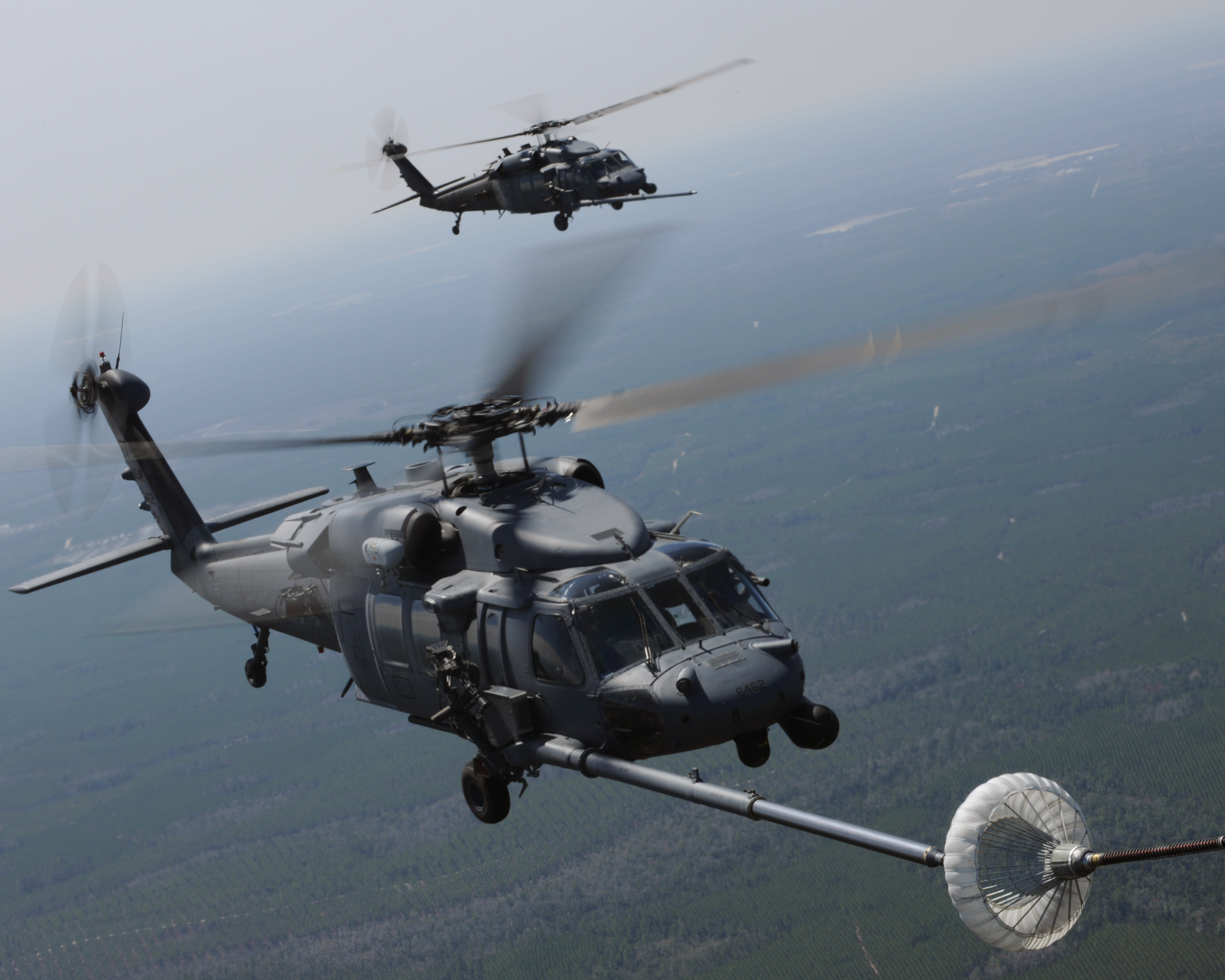
An HH-60G Pave Hawk from the 41st Rescue Squadron prepares to refuel from a HC-130P Hercules.

The 41st has flown search and rescue missions from, 1952–1960, 1962–1987, and since 1989. It also recovered high-altitude atmospheric-sampling devices from, 1962–1987. Beginning in Mar 1989, the squadron has provided prelaunch security and safety surveillance of NASA launches and recovery or medical evacuation for Space Shuttle crewmembers.

== Lineage ==
- Constituted as the 41st Air Rescue Squadron on 17 October 1952

Activated on 14 November 1952
Discontinued and inactivated on 18 March 1960

- Activated on 29 December 1961 (not organized)

Organized on 8 January 1962
Redesignated 41st Aerospace Rescue and Recovery Squadron on 8 January 1966
Inactivated on 30 September 1987

- Activated on 1 March 1989

Redesignated 41st Air Rescue Squadron on 1 June 1989
Redesignated 41st Rescue Squadron on 1 February 1993

=== Assignments ===
- 4th Air Rescue Group, 14 November 1952
- Air Rescue Service, 8 December 1956 – 18 March 1960 (Note: Dollman says Air Rescue and Recovery Service, but this designation was never used.)
- Military Air Transport Service, 29 December 1961 (not organized)
- Air Rescue Service (later Aerospace Rescue and Recovery Service), 8 January 1962
- 39th Aerospace Rescue and Recovery Wing, 1 January 1970
- 41st Rescue and Weather Reconnaissance Wing, 1 September 1975 – 30 September 1987
- 41st Rescue and Weather Reconnaissance Wing, 1 March 1989 (attached to Eastern Space and Missile Center for operational control)
- Air Rescue Service, 1 August 1989 (attached to Eastern Space and Missile Center (later 45th Space Wing) for operational control)
- 1st Operations Group, 1 February 1993
- 1st Rescue Group, 14 June 1995
- 347th Operations Group (later 347th Rescue Group), 1 April 1997 – present

=== Stations ===
- Hamilton Air Force Base, California, 14 November 1952 – 18 March 1960
- Hamilton Air Force Base, California, 8 January 1962
- McClellan Air Force Base, California, 1 August 1973 – 30 September 1987
- Patrick Air Force Base, Florida, 1 March 1989
- Moody Air Force Base, Georgia, 1 April 1997 – present

=== Aircraft ===
- Boeing SB-17 Dumbo (1952 – c. 1953)
- Fairchild C-82 Packet (1952–1953)
- Sikorsky H-5 Dragonfly (1952 – c. 1953)
- Grumman SA-16 Albatross (later HU-16) (1953 – c. 1960, 1962–1968)
- Sikorsky SH-19 (later HH-19) (c. 1953 – c. 1960, 1962–1963)
- Kaman HH-43 Huskie (1963)
- Lockheed HC-130 Hercules (1966–1987)
- Sikorsky HH-53 Super Jolly Green Giant (1971–1973, 1976–1987)
- Sikorsky HH-3 Jolly Green Giant (1973–1976, 1989–1994)
- Sikorsky HH-60G Pave Hawk (1994–2021)
- Sikorsky HH-60W Jolly Green II (2020-present)

== See also ==
- List of United States Air Force rescue squadrons
