= 332nd Air Expeditionary Wing =

United States Air Force Air Combat Command unit

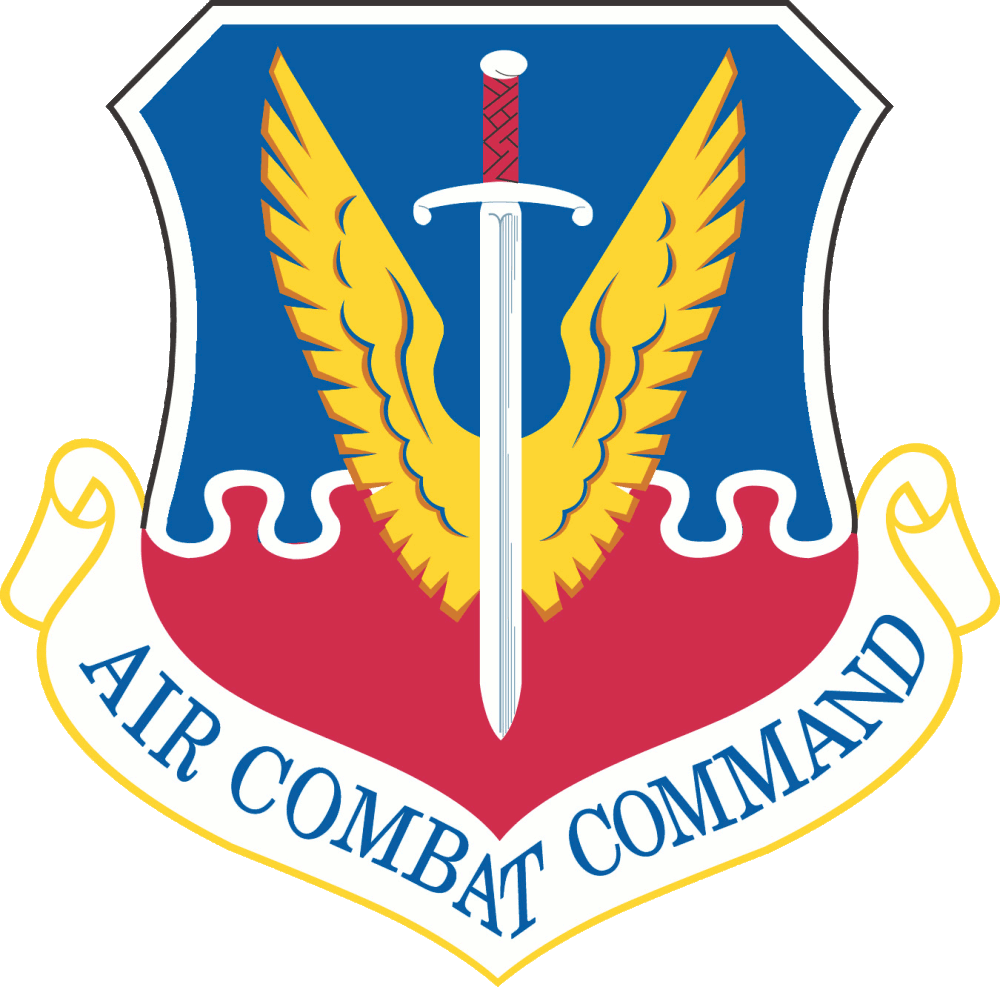
332nd Air Expeditionary Wing

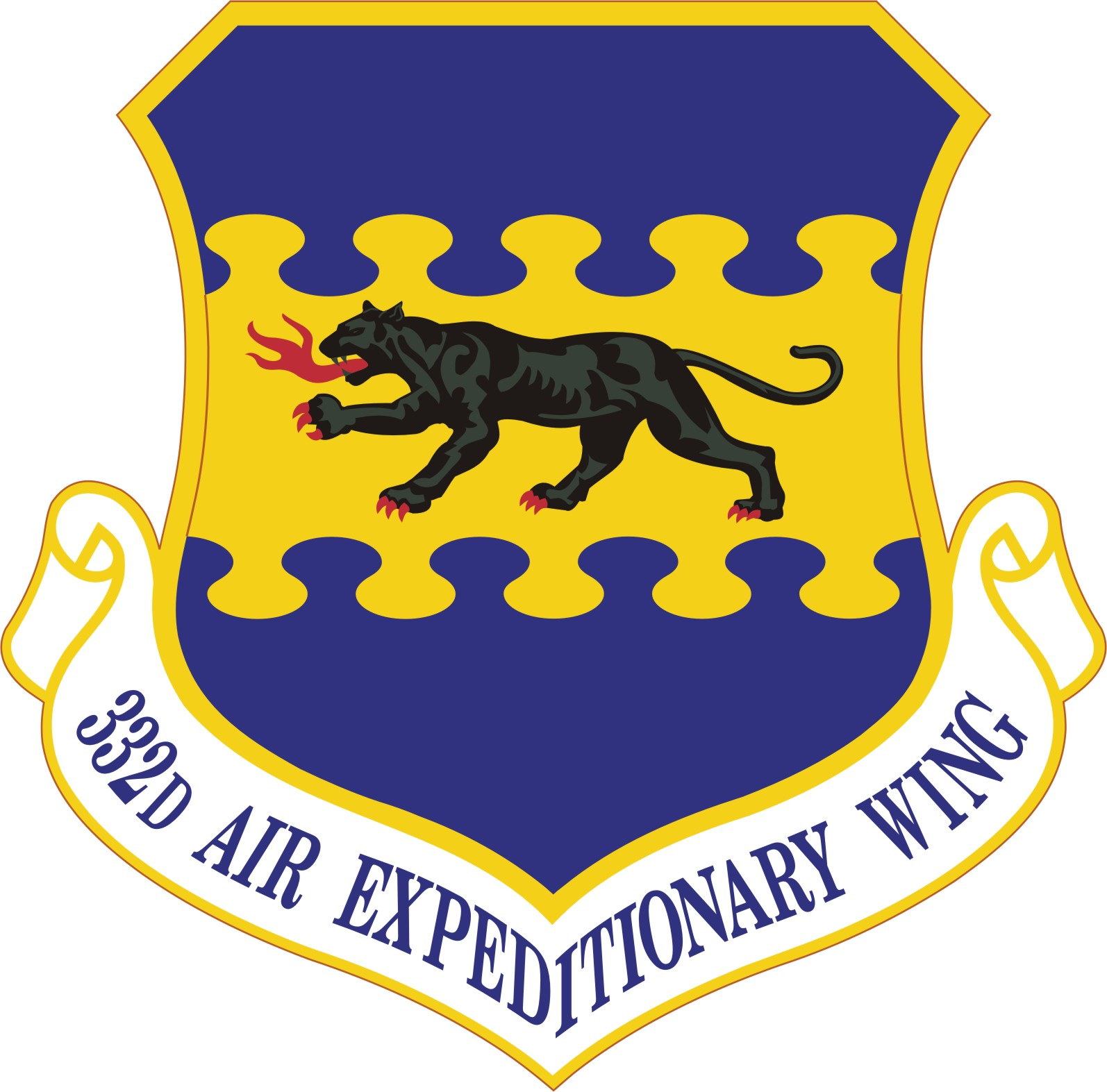
- 332nd Air Expeditionary Wing emblem
- Active: 1947–1948; 1948–1949; 2002–2012; 2015–present
- Country: United States
- Branch: United States Air Force
- Type: Provisional Expeditionary Wing
- Part of: Air Combat Command
- Garrison/HQ: Southwest Asia
- Motto: Tuskegee Airmen...The Legend Continues
- Colors: Air Force Blue and Yellow
- Engagements: Operation Iraqi Freedom; Operation Enduring Freedom; Syrian Civil War

Commanders
- Current commander: Brig. Gen. Christopher S. Sage
- Vice commander: Col. Christopher M. Auger
- Command Chief: Command Chief Master Sergeant Sean M. Milligan
- Notable commanders: Gen. Benjamin O. Davis, Jr. Lt. Gen. Burton M. Field; Gen. Robin Rand; Gen. Frank Gorenc; Maj. Gen. David Iverson

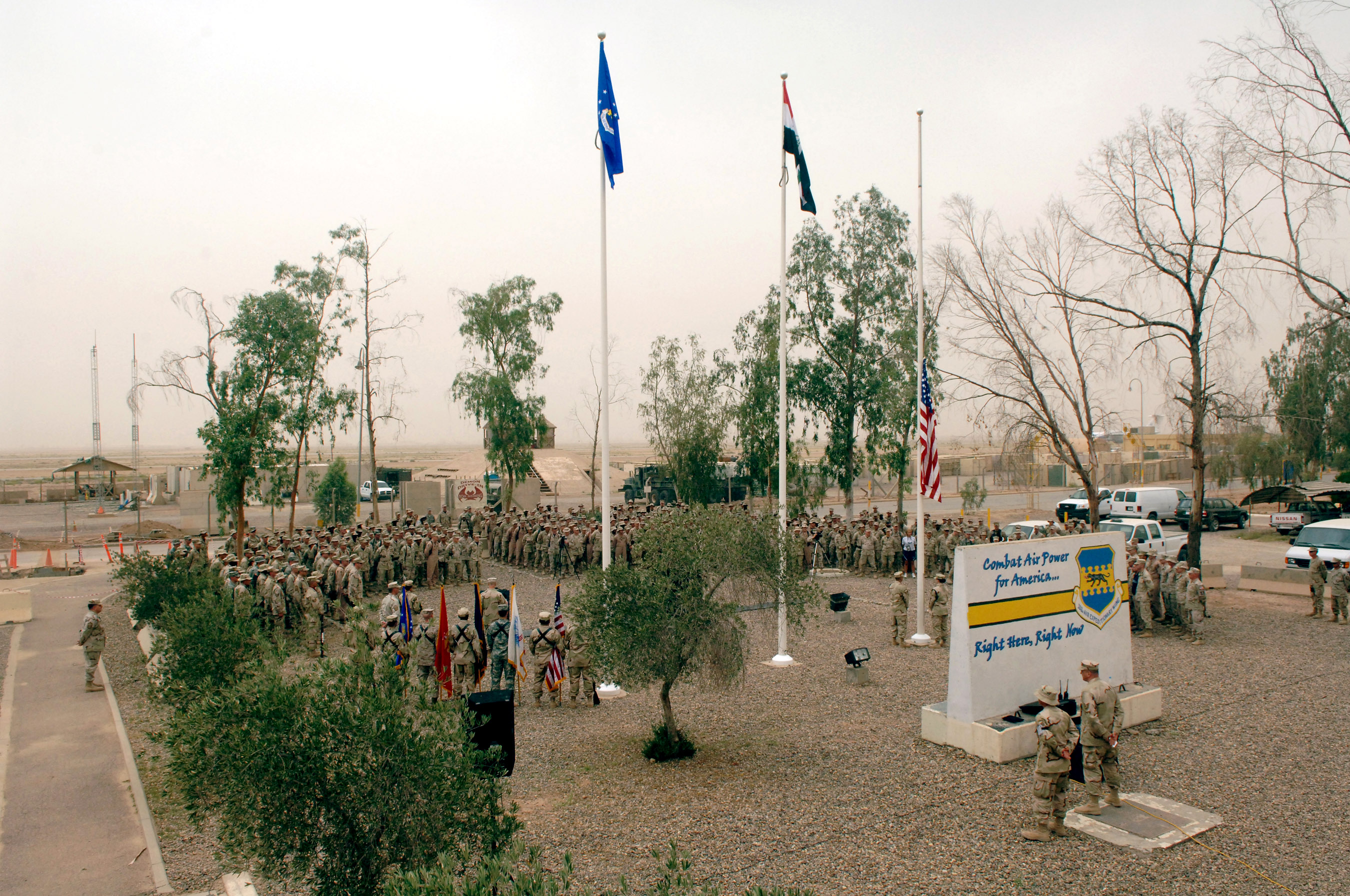
Balad Airmen honor fallen on Memorial Day 2007

The 332nd Air Expeditionary Wing is a provisional wing of Air Combat Command, currently active. It was last inactivated on 8 May 2012, and most recently reactivated on 19 May 2015.

The Wing's 332nd Expeditionary Operations Group is the direct descendant organization of the World War II 332nd Fighter Group, the Tuskegee Airmen. The title Tuskegee Airmen refers to all who trained in the groundbreaking Army Air Forces African-American pilot training program at Moton Field and Tuskegee Army Airfield, Alabama between 1941 and 1945. It includes pilots, navigators, bombardiers, maintenance and support staff, instructors and all the personnel who kept the planes in the air.

== Overview ==
The 332 AEW conducted a number of missions. The F-16 aircraft were responsible for maintaining air supremacy in the skies over Iraq. Additionally, the A-10 and F-16 aircraft performed close air support missions as required. The C-130 unit provided required airlift within Iraq and to other US Central Command bases as necessary. The HH-60 Pave Hawks performed combat search and rescue missions. Finally, the MQ-1 Predators and MC-12W Liberty aircraft provided surveillance and reconnaissance within Iraq. Additionally, the unit operated the Air Force Theater Hospital and served as the Contingency Aeromedical Staging Facility.

The wing used the General Dynamics F-16 Fighting Falcon, Fairchild Republic A-10 Thunderbolt II, and the MQ-1 Predator unmanned aerial vehicle (UAV) for close air support and traditional and non-traditional intelligence, surveillance, and reconnaissance missions.

In a departure from traditional Air Force missions, the 732nd Air Expeditionary Group oversaw and advocated for up to 1,800 Air Force personnel who were assigned to U.S. Army and Marine units throughout Iraq. Operating from Balad Air Base at its inception, its six squadrons provided direct Joint and Coalition combat and combat support to and/or in lieu of US Army, Marine Corps and Iraqi Army and Police Forces at over 60 locations, including downtown Baghdad; Camp Speicher; Al Asad Air Base; Camp Anaconda (Balad Air Base); Camp Bucca; Camp Caldwell (Kirkush); Tallil Air Base; Mosul Air Base; Camp Rustamiyah; Baghdad International Airport; Green Zone; Kirkuk Air Base; Camp Hadithah; and Taji Air Base.

== Units ==
- 1st Expeditionary Rescue Group at Al Asad Airbase, Iraq. The unit was formerly at Diyarbakır Air Base, Turkey.
- 447th Air Expeditionary Group at Incirlik Air Base, Turkey.
- 332nd Expeditionary Operations Group
- 332nd Expeditionary Maintenance Group
- 332nd Expeditionary Mission Support Group
- 332nd Expeditionary Medical Group
- 22nd Expeditionary Air Refueling Squadron

== History ==
The 332nd Fighter Group, part of the Tuskegee Airmen, was a hard-fighting Army Air Forces unit in Europe during the Second World War.

The 332nd Fighter Wing was established in July 1947 under the United States Air Force's Hobson Plan, the wing/base reorganization. The 332nd Fighter Group becoming the operational component of the wing, controlling its flying squadrons. the 332nd Fighter Wing replaced the 447th Composite Group and 580th Air Service Group. The new wing participated in firepower demonstrations, gunnery training, and operational missions to maintain combat proficiency. The African-American segregated unit was inactivated in July 1949 as a result of Executive Order 9981. EO 9981 abolished racial discrimination in the United States Armed Forces. The 332nd's personnel and equipment were reassigned to other units.

=== Air Expeditionary Wing ===
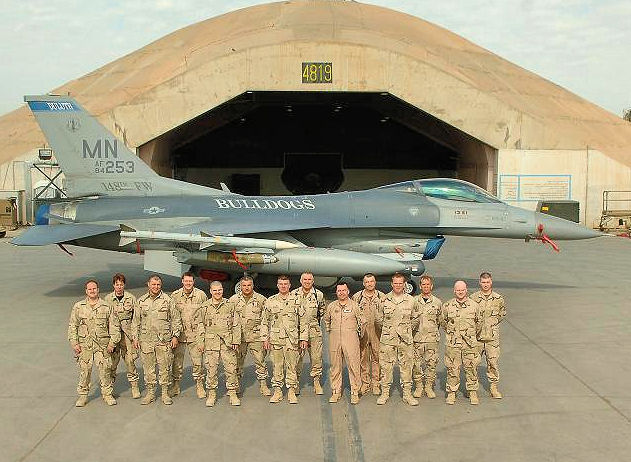
In front of F-16C block 25 #84-1253 from the 179th Expeditionary Fighter Squadron, Minnesota ANG, airmen pose for a 'family' photograph at Balad AB, on 20 March 2007.

In August 2002, the Air Combat Command (ACC) 332nd Air Expeditionary Group at Ahmad al-Jaber Air Base, Kuwait, was authorized to expand to a Wing. The 332nd Air Expeditionary Wing was activated as a provisional organization on 12 August 2002 by ACC, with the 332nd AEG becoming the Wing's flying organization. A support organization was also activated as part of the 332 AEW, consisting of the 332nd Expeditionary Maintenance Group; 332nd Expeditionary Mission Support Group; 332nd Expeditionary Medical Group, and the 332nd Expeditionary Security Forces Group.

At its peak strength, the 332nd AEW consisted of over 8,000 personnel, including 1,800 Airmen of the 732 AEG, provided operational oversight for Airmen tactically assigned to U.S. Army and Marine units at over 60 forward operating locations throughout Iraq.

Employing A-10 Thunderbolt IIs, F-16 Fighting Falcons, HH-60 Pave Hawk rescue helicopters and HC-130 Hercules aircraft the 332nd AEW initially participated in Operation Enduring Freedom (OEF), playing a critical role in the defeat of the Taliban regime and later providing key air support for Afghanistan's provisional government.

After the initiation of Operation Iraqi Freedom (OIF) the 332nd was moved to Tallil Air Base, Iraq. To better position airpower within the theater of operations, the 332nd AEW moved to Balad Air Base, Iraq, in February 2004. In June 2008, the base was officially renamed Joint Base Balad. The new name was indicative of the joint nature of operations by all branches of service at the base.

During the height of operations, the 332nd AEW contained nine groups. Four were geographically separated—the 407th, 447th, 438th Air Expeditionary Group and 506th Air Expeditionary Groups located respectively at Ali Air Base, Sather Air Base, Al Asad Air Base, Kirkuk Air Base—as well as numerous detachments and operating locations scattered throughout Iraq. The wing had as many as two F-16 fighter squadrons, a Predator UAV squadron, a C-130 squadron, a combat search and rescue squadron (HH-60s), a MC-12 Liberty squadron, and a Control and Reporting Center.

At Joint Base Balad (JBB), the 332nd Air Expeditionary Wing consisted of the following major groups:

- 332nd Expeditionary Operations Group
- 332nd Expeditionary Maintenance Group

Provided combat-ready aircraft and munitions to the Air Component Commander in support of Coalition forces throughout Iraq. Was responsible for on- and off-aircraft maintenance and sortie generation in support of Lockheed Martin F-16 Fighting Falcons, C-130 Hercules, HH-60 Pave Hawks, MQ1 Predators, and the MC-12 Liberty, as well as launch, recovery and servicing support for military and commercial transient aircraft

- 332nd Expeditionary Medical Group

Consisted of approximately 357 professional and support staff from all four armed services working alongside civilians and contractors that provided state-of-the-art medical care. The medical group was the only air-evacuation hospital in Iraq and provided a full-spectrum of medical services for Coalition and U.S. forces throughout the Iraqi theater of operations.

- 332nd Expeditionary Mission Support Group

Enabled sustained and protected combat capability for US Air Forces Central, 332nd Air Expeditionary Wing, Joint Base Balad, and detachments. The 332 EMSG provided expeditionary communications, services, civil engineering, force protection, personnel accountability, and logistics-readiness operations in support of DoD's busiest single-runway operation. In addition, the 332 EMSG provided base-life support to the approximately 26,000 servicemembers and civilians on JBB.

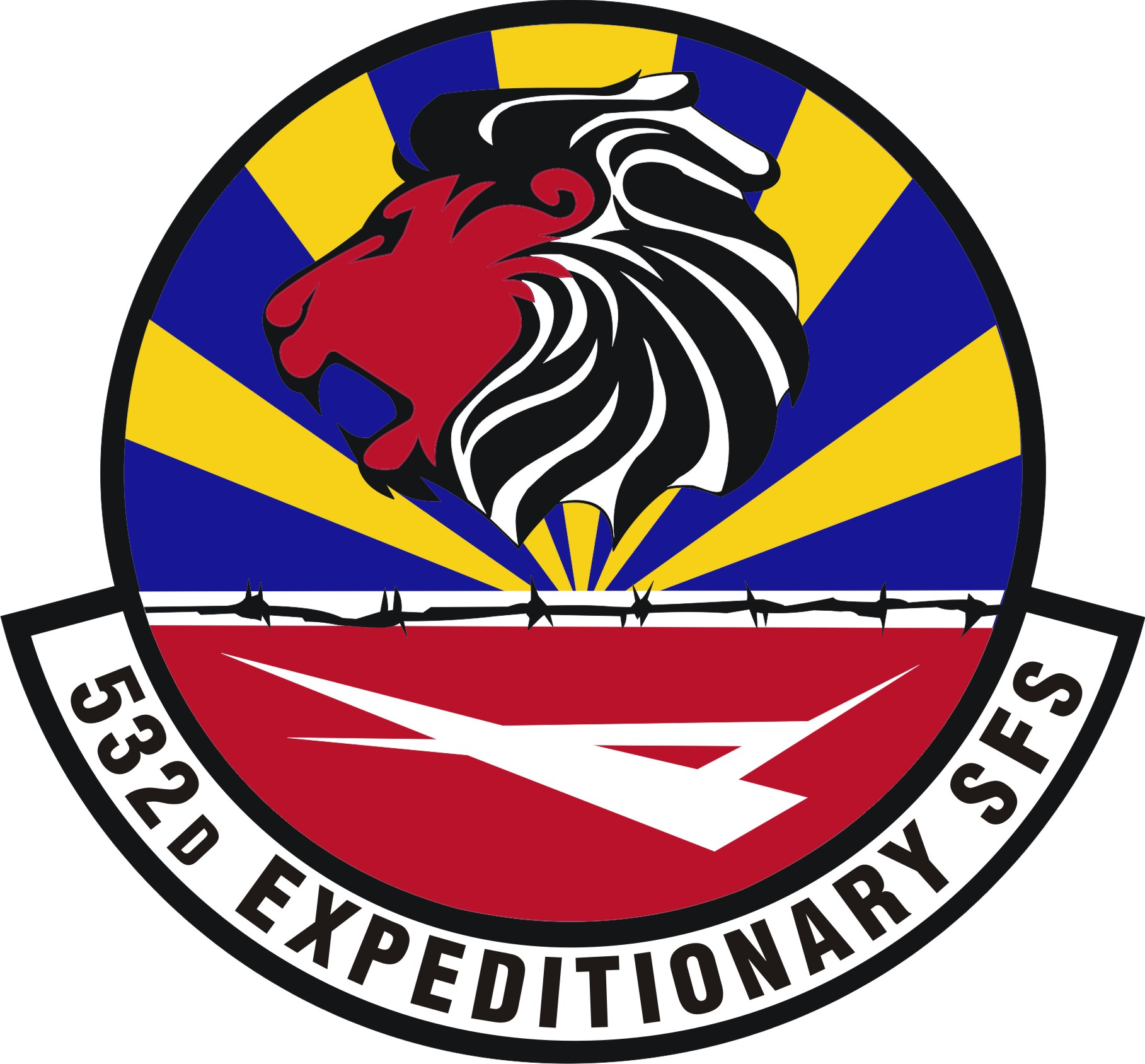
The emblem of the 532 ESFS.

- 332nd Expeditionary Security Forces Group

The Security Forces Group was activated on 24 July 2008, at JBB, Iraq. Its activation marked the first time the Air Force deployed more than 900 people within a single unit to defend an air base in combat since the Vietnam War. The members of the 332nd ESFG work side-by-side with soldiers of the U.S. and Iraqi armies to provide physical security in the area around JBB. The Group was made up of two squadrons; the 332nd Expeditionary Security Forces Squadron provided base law enforcement and flight line security and the 532nd Expeditionary Security Forces Squadron provided security at the three entry control points to the base as well as a quick reaction force for "outside-the-wire" missions. The group was initially led by Colonel Decknick who was the prior Group commander for the 820th Security Forces Group.

- 732 Air Expeditionary Group

The 732 AEG, originally the 732 Expeditionary Mission Support Group, was re-designated an air expeditionary group in December 2006 to reflect its theater-wide responsibilities. Operating from Balad Air Base, the six squadrons of the 732 AEG provided direct Joint and Coalition combat and combat support to and/or in lieu of US Army, Marine Corps and Iraqi Army and Police Forces at over 44 locations, including downtown Baghdad; Camp Speicher; Al Asad Air Base; Camp Anaconda; Camp Bucca; Camp Habbaniyah; Camp Caldwell (Kirkush); Tallil Air Base; Mosul Air Base; Camp Rustamiyah; Baghdad International Airport; Green Zone; Kirkuk Air Base; Camp Hadithah; and Taji Air Base. 732 AEG had over 1800 Airmen assigned, including security forces, RED HORSE and civil engineers, lawyers, truck drivers, interrogators, military working dog teams, intelligence specialists, explosive ordnance disposal specialist, logisticians, and airfield managers.

During the drawdown of forces from Iraq, the 332nd AEW provided surveillance, reconnaissance, combat search and rescue, armed overwatch and close air support to the enormous logistics movement—one of the largest since the original move of forces to Saudi Arabia and the Guld States in 1990.

The wing continued to operate from Balad until moving in November-December 2011 to another nearby, undisclosed, country. Joint Base Balad was returned to the government of Iraq. In support of the U.S. withdrawal, the wing continued to support U.S. Forces-Iraq. And as the last U.S. convoy left Iraq on 18 December 2011 with the 332nd AEW's F-16s and MQ-1B Predators in the skies providing overhead watch.

As of 2020, the wing was located at Muwaffaq Salti Air Base, Jordan.

== Lineage ==
- Established as 332nd Fighter Wing on 28 July 1947

Organized on 15 August 1947
Discontinued on 28 August 1948

- Activated on 28 August 1948

Inactivated on 1 July 1949

- Redesignated as 332nd Air Expeditionary Wing, 1 August 2002

Converted to provisional status and allocated to Air Combat Command to activate or inactivate any time after 1 August 2002
Activated on 12 August 2002
Inactivated on 8 May 2012
Activated on 19 May 2015

=== Assignments ===
- Ninth Air Force, 15 August 1947 – 28 August 1948; 26 August 1948 – 1 July 1949

Attached to: First Air Force, 15 Jan-l Feb 1949

- Air Combat Command

Attached to: United States Central Command Air Forces, 12 August 2002 – 5 August 2009
Attached to: United States Air Forces Central, 5 August 2009 – 8 May 2012; 19 May 2015–present.

=== Components ===
- 332nd Fighter Group, (later Expeditionary Operations Group), 15 August 1947 – 28 August 1948; 26 August 1948 – 1 July 1949. 12 August 2002 – 8 May 2012
- 332nd Expeditionary Maintenance Group
- 332nd Expeditionary Mission Support Group
- 332nd Expeditionary Medical Group
- 332nd Expeditionary Security Forces Group
- 407th Air Expeditionary Group
- 438th Air Expeditionary Group
- 447th Air Expeditionary Group
- 506th Air Expeditionary Group
- 732nd Air Expeditionary Group
- 332nd Expeditionary Communications Squadron

=== Stations ===
- Lockbourne Army Air Base (later Lockbourne AirFoce Base), Ohio, 15 August 1947 – 1 July 1949
- Ahmad al-Jaber Air Base, Kuwait, 12 August 2002
- Tallil Air Base, Iraq, March 2003
- Balad Air Base (later Joint Base Balad), Iraq, 2004
- Undisclosed Location, 18 December 2011 – 8 May 2012
- Undisclosed Location, 19 May 2015 – Present

=== Aircraft ===
- F-47N Thunderbolt, 1947–1949
- O/A-10 Thunderbolt II, 1995, 1999, 2001–2003
- F/A-18C/D Hornet, 2002
- MQ-1A Predator, 2003–2011
- HH-60 Pave Hawk, 2003–2011
- F-16C/D Fighting Falcon, 2003–2011
- F-15C/D Eagle, 2003–2011
- F-15E Strike Eagle, 2003–2011
- C-130 Hercules, 2003–2011
- A-10 Thunderbolt II, 2007–2011
- MC-12W Liberty, 2009–2011
- P-51C/D Mustang, 1944-1945

=== Decorations ===
- Air Force Outstanding Unit Award with Valor Iraq, 16 September 2002 – 15 September 2003
- Air Force Meritorious Unit Award Iraq, 1 May 2005 – 31 January 2007
- Air Force Meritorious Unit Award Iraq, 1 February 2007 – 31 January 2008
- Air Force Meritorious Unit Award Iraq, 1 February 2008 – 31 January 2009
- Air Force Meritorious Unit Award Iraq, 1 June 2009 – 31 May 2010
- Air Force Meritorious Unit Award Iraq, 1 June 2010 – 31 May 2011
