= 732nd Air Expeditionary Group =

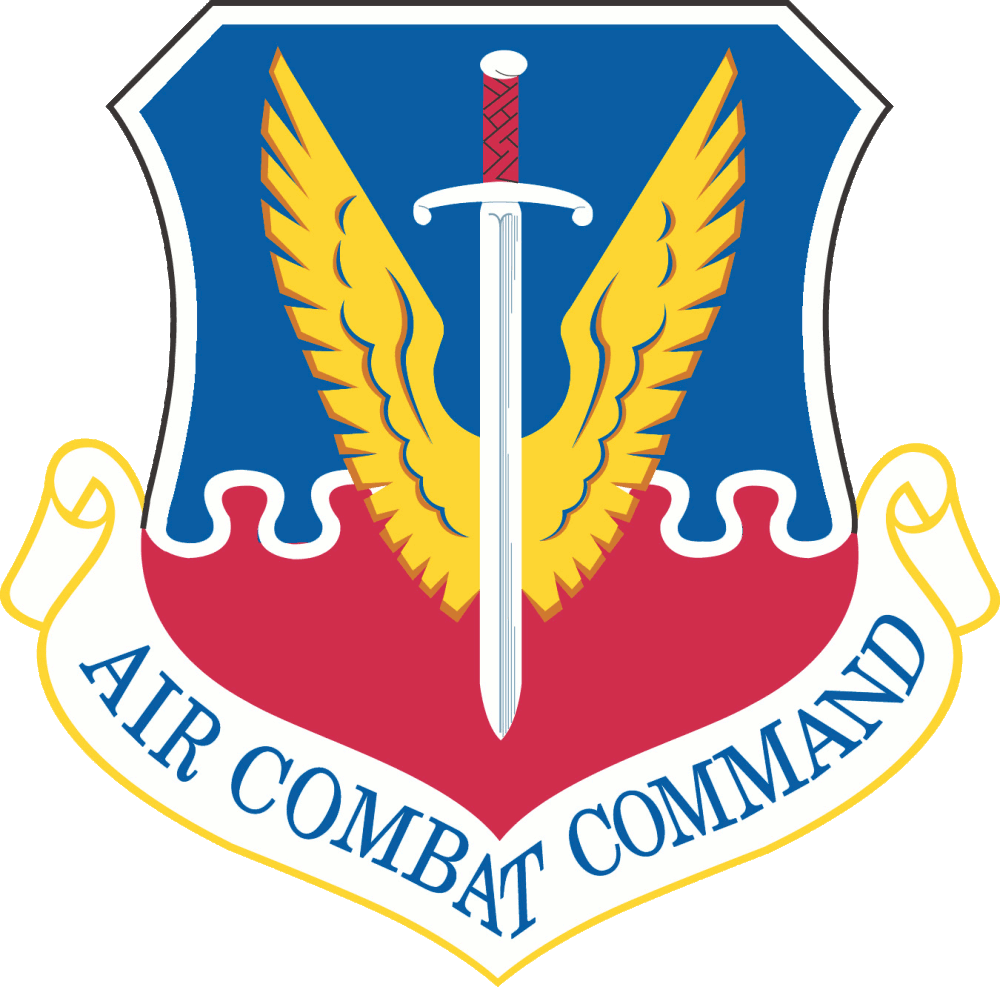
732nd Air Expeditionary Group

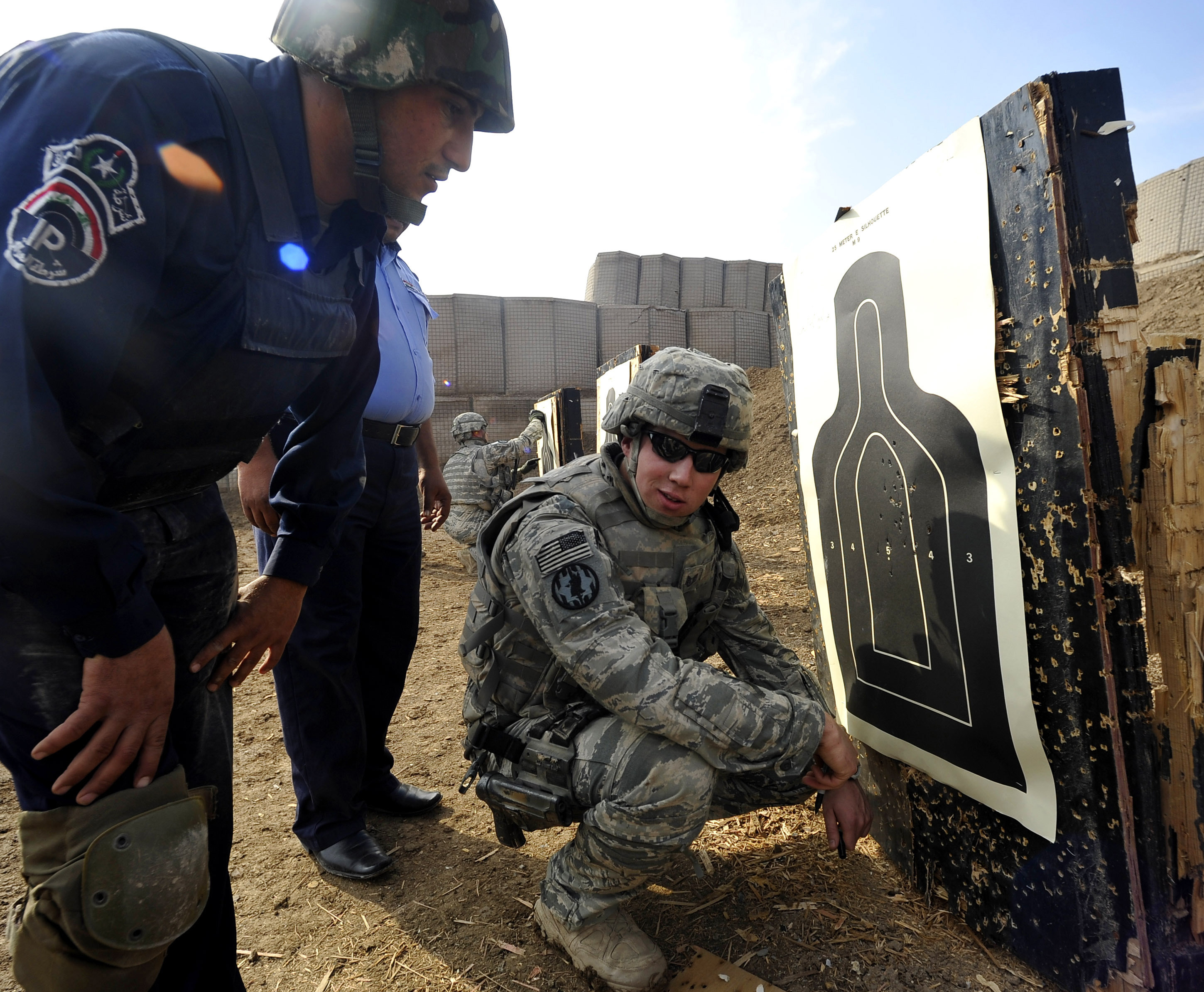
- A member of the 732nd Expeditionary Security Forces Squadron with Iraqi police officers
- Active: 1940–1945; 2004–2010
- Country: United States
- Branch: United States Air Force
- Type: Air Expeditionary Group
- Part of: Air Combat Command
- Engagements: European Theater of Operations global war on terrorism
- Decorations: Meritorious Unit Citation; Air Force Meritorious Unit Award

Insignia
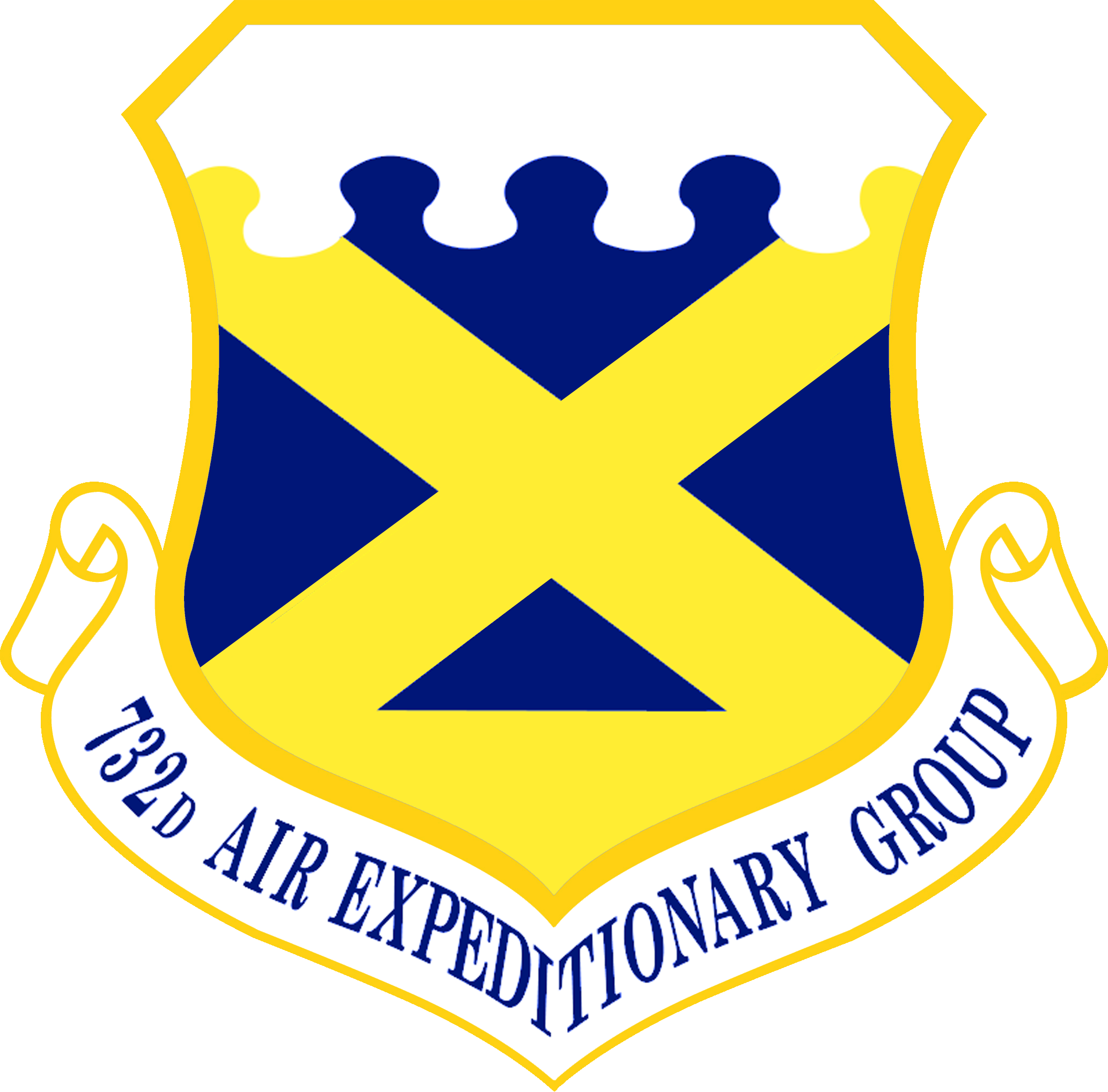
- 732nd Air Expeditionary Group emblem

The 732nd Air Expeditionary Group is an inactive provisional United States Air Force unit. It was last active at Joint Base Balad, where it provided support for airmen supporting units of other services in Iraq.

The group was first activated as the 32nd Air Base Group in 1940. As the 32nd Service Group, it provided support for Ninth Air Force Units in the European Theater of Operations until it was inactivated shortly after VE Day.

== History ==
=== World War II ===
The group was first activated in 1940 at March Field, California as the 32nd Air Base Group with an air base squadron and two materiel squadrons assigned. In June 1942, along with other air base groups, its air base squadron was reassigned and it was converted into the 32nd Service Group, a support unit designed to provide support for two combat groups. After training in the United States, It moved to England, where it served with IX Air Force Service Command until it was disbanded in June 1945, when the Army Air Forces replaced its service groups with air service groups consisting entirely of Air Corps personnel and designed to support a single combat group.

=== War in Iraq ===
The 732nd Air Expeditionary Group was a subordinate unit to the 332nd Air Expeditionary Wing, whose heritage is tied to the famous 332nd Fighter Group led by the Tuskegee Airmen in World War II. Its mission and traditions were carried out by airmen headquartered at Joint Base Balad, Iraq with the motto "Tuskegee Airmen...The Legend Continues."

The 732nd Air Expeditionary Group was composed of roughly 1,800 Air Force personnel spread across six squadrons with detachments tactically assigned to U.S. Army, Marine Corps and Coalition units at 44 locations throughout Iraq. Originally the 732 Expeditionary Mission Support Group, the unit was re-designated an air expeditionary group to reflect its theater-wide combat and combat support responsibilities at the height of the 2006–2007 US military surge. The six squadrons of the 732 AEG conducted combat and combat support for or in lieu of US Army, Marine Corps and Iraqi Army and Police Forces, at locations including downtown Baghdad; Camp Speicher; Al Asad Air Base; Camp Anaconda (Balad Air Base); Camp Habbaniyah; Camp Bucca; Camp Caldwell (Kirkush); Tallil Air Base; Mosul Air Base; Camp Rustamiyah; Baghdad International Airport; Green Zone; Kirkuk Air Base; Camp Hadithah; Taji Air Base and numerous forward operating bases. Colonel Larry Jackson assumed command of the 732 EMSG in July 2006 and, after December 2006, served as the first 732 AEG commander until July 2007 during which the brigade-level group's Airmen included security forces, Red Horse and civil engineers, military working dog teams, intelligence specialists, explosive ordnance disposal specialists, logisticians and transportation specialists, airfield managers, judge advocate and legal services specialists and interrogators. The 732nd's motto was "Combat Airpower with a Hooah...Right Here, Right Now!"

Reflecting its active combat and combat support mission, the 732nd suffered 42 battle casualties from July 2006 to July 2007 including six killed-in-action: Capt. Kermit O. Evans, Master Sgt. Brad A. Clemmons, Staff Sgt. John T. Self, Army Sgt. Keith E. Fiscus, Airman 1st Class LeeBernard E. Chavis, and Airman 1st Class Jason D. Nathan. Redesignated 732nd Air Expeditionary Group in December 2006 with Colonel Lawrence M. Jackson II as its first commander. The group was inactivated in November 2010 and the 467th Air Expeditionary Group was activated in its place.

== Lineage ==
- Constituted as the 32nd Air Base Group (Reinforced) on 20 November 1940 (Note: This unit is not related to the 32nd Air Base Group that was constituted on 10 August 1948 and activated at Kadena Air Base 18 Aug 1948, inactivated 1 April 1949 and reactivated at Minot Air Force Base from 1 February 1961 to 1 July 1962. See Fletcher, p. 63; Mueller, p. 421.)

Activated on 15 January 1941
Redesignated 32nd Air Base Group on 6 November 1941
Redesignated 32nd Service Group on 13 June 1942
Disbanded on 11 June 1945
Reconstituted, redesignated 732nd Expeditionary Mission Support Group and converted to provisional status on 14 January 2004. Assigned to Air Combat Command to activate or inactivate as needed.
Activated on 2 March 2004
Redesignated 732nd Air Expeditionary Group in December 2006
Inactivated on 12 November 2010

=== Assignments ===
- GHQ Air Force (later Air Force Combat Command), 15 January 1941
- 4th Air Force Service Command (later, 4th Air Base Command), 1 October 1941
- Western Theater of Operations, Air Service Command, 30 December 1941
- Mobile Air Service Area Command, c. January 1943
- Warner Robins Air Service Area Command, 1943
- Eighth Air Force (later United States Strategic Air Forces in Europe), 28 January 1944
- IX Air Force Service Command, 4 February 1944 – 11 June 1945
- 332nd Air Expeditionary Wing, 2 March 2004 – 12 November 2010

=== Stations ===
- March Field, California, 15 January 1941
- Dale Mabry Field, Florida, 31 December 1942
- Venice Army Air Field, Florida, 9 October 1943 – 27 December 1943
- RAF Zeals (Station 450), England, 31 January 1944
- RAF Kingsnorth (Station 418), England, 11 March 1944
- Brucheville Airfield (A-16), France, 8 July 1944
- Le Mans Airfield (A-35), France, 29 August 1944
- Athis Airfield (A-76), France, 30 September 1944
- Juvincourt Airfield (A-68), France, 6 October 1944
- Le Culot Airfield (A-89), France, 27 October 1944
  - Detachment A

Aachen, Germany, 29 March 1945
Niedermendig, Germany, 9 April 1945
Kassel, Germany, 22 April – 11 June 1945

  - Detachment B

Venio, Netherlands, 16 March 1945
Lippstadt, Germany, 23 April 1945
Munich, Germany, 26 May – 11 June 1945

  - Detachment C

Charleroi, Belgium, 20 March 1945
Maastricht, Netherlands, c. March 1945
Wiesbaden, Germany, 20 April – 11 June 45

- Joint Base Balad, Iraq 14 January 2004 – 12 November 2010

=== Honors ===
- Service Streamers: World War II American Theater
- Campaign Streamers.
  - World War II:
    - Normandy 1944
    - Northern France 1944
    - Rhineland 1944–1945
    - Central Europe 1945
- Armed Forces Expeditionary Streamers. None
- Decorations. Meritorious Unit Citation: England, France, Belgium, 18 January – 30 November 1944.
