= 1st Expeditionary Rescue Group =

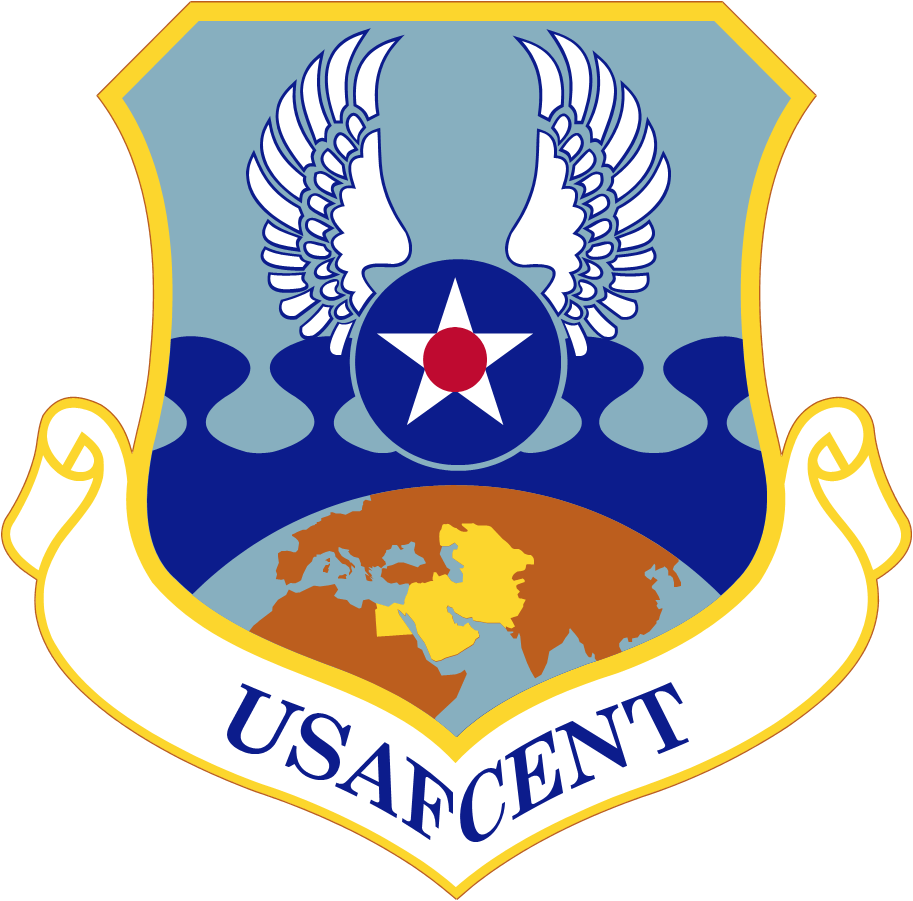
1st Expeditionary Rescue Group

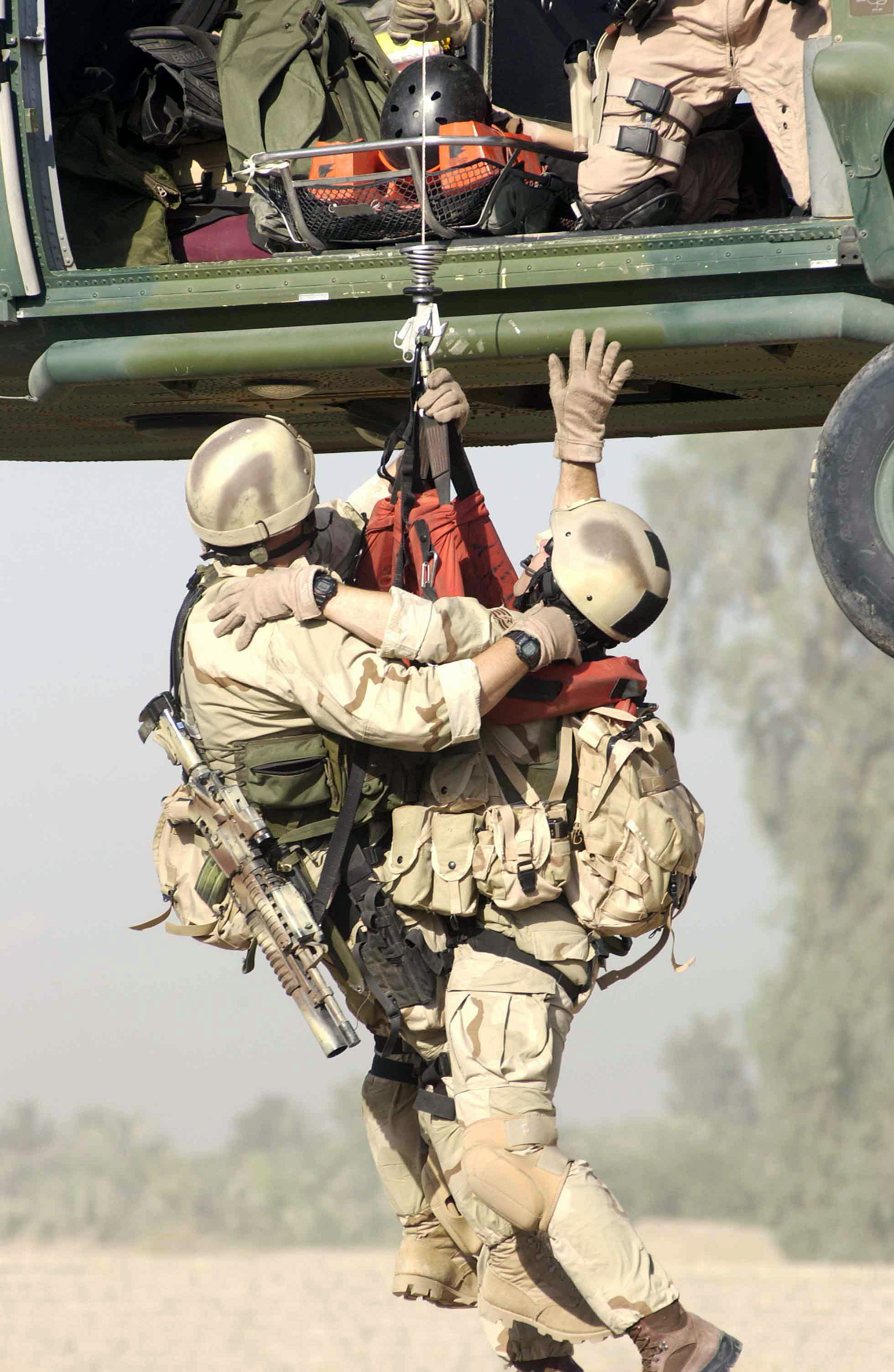
- US Air Force pararescue personnel perform a hoist extraction of a survivor during an urban operations training exercise
- Active: 1943–1946, 1946–1956, 1995–1997, 2015–
- Country: United States
- Branch: United States Air Force
- Role: Combat search and rescue
- Part of: United States Air Forces Central Command
- Mottos: "... These Things We Do, That Others May Live"
- Equipment: HH-60 Pave Hawk; Lockheed Martin C-130J Super Hercules
- Decorations: Presidential Unit Citation

Commanders
- Current commander: Gregory A. Roberts
- Notable commander: Virgil LO. Zoller

Insignia
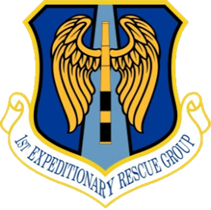
- 1st Expeditionary Rescue Group emblem

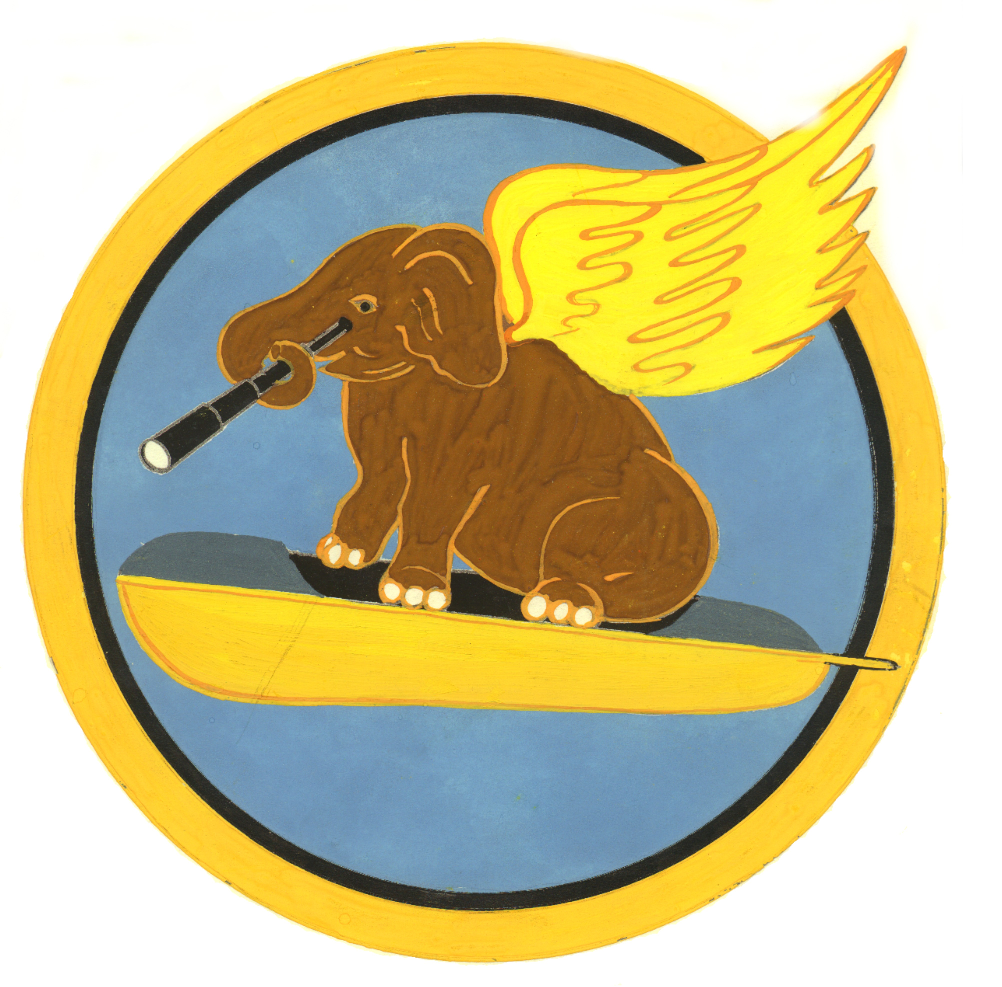
- 1st Air Rescue Sq emblem (Note: Approved 23 January 1951)

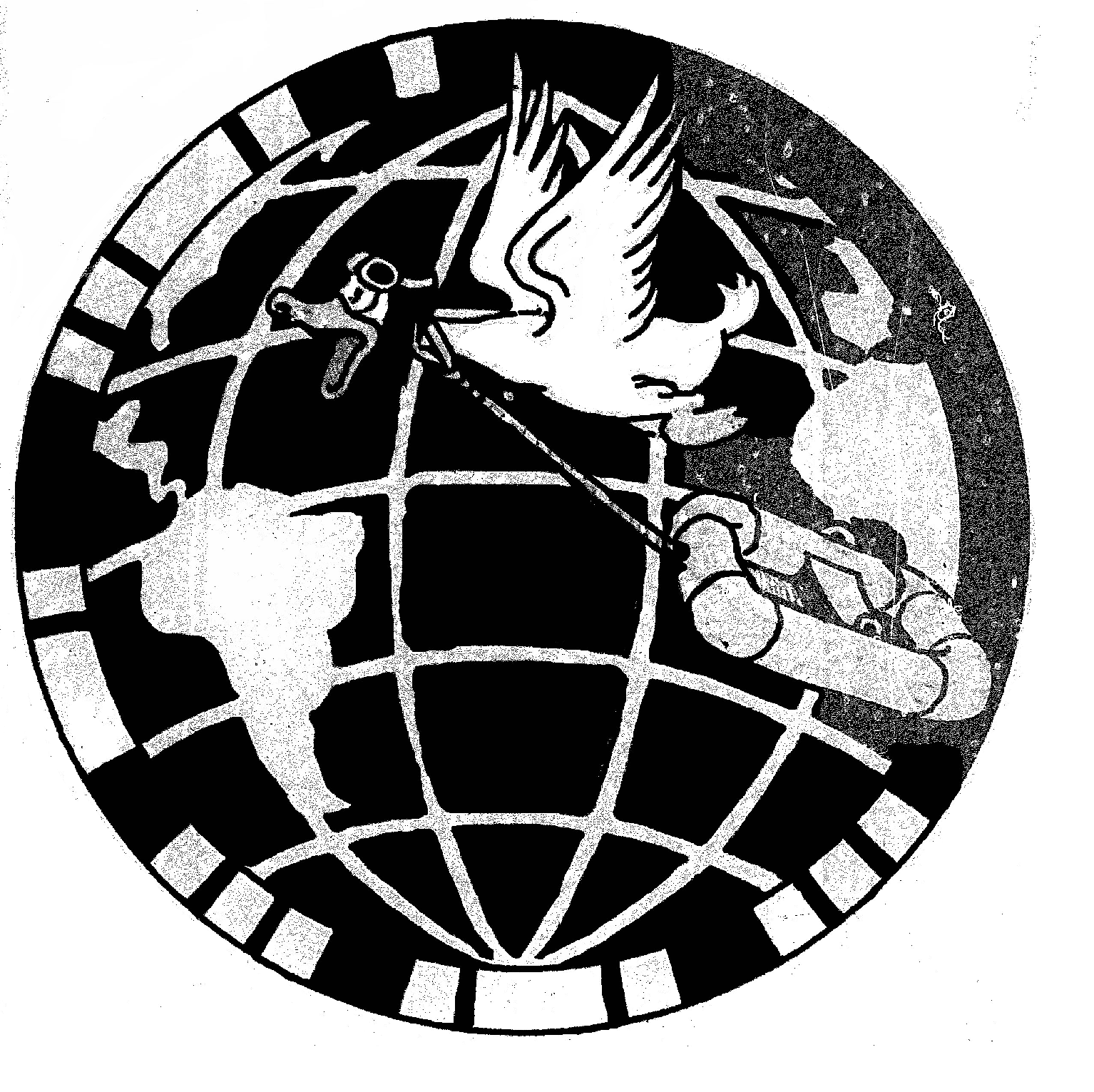
- 1st Emergency Rescue Sq emblem

The 1st Expeditionary Rescue Group is a provisional unit of the United States Air Force assigned to Air Combat Command to activate or inactivate as necessary. It was activated in Southwest Asia in September 2015 to provide combat search and rescue for Operation Inherent Resolve.

The group was first activated during World War II as the 1st Emergency Rescue Squadron. After training with the United States Navy in Florida, the squadron moved to the Mediterranean Theater of Operations, where it flew Consolidated OA-10 Catalinas (and later other aircraft) to perform combat search and rescue missions, earning a Distinguished Unit Citation in August 1944. After VE Day, the squadron returned to the United States and was inactivated in 1946.

The group was activated later in 1946 as the 1st Rescue Squadron and was responsible for air rescue operations in the Caribbean and mid-Atlantic area. In 1952, it expanded to become the 1st Air Rescue Group, but was inactivated in 1956 as Air Force operations in the Caribbean were reduced. It was active again in 1995 at Patrick Air Force Base, Florida, where it provided rescue and range support for the Eastern Test Range. It was inactivated in 1997, when its component squadrons moved to Moody Air Force Base, Georgia and were reassigned, while the Eastern Test Range support mission was assumed by Air Force Reserve Command.

The group's mission is combat search and rescue.

== Units ==
The 1st Expeditionary Rescue Group consists of the following units:

- 26th Expeditionary Rescue Squadron
- 46th Expeditionary Rescue Squadron
- 52nd Expeditionary Rescue Squadron
- 801st Expeditionary Maintenance Squadron

== History ==
=== World War II ===
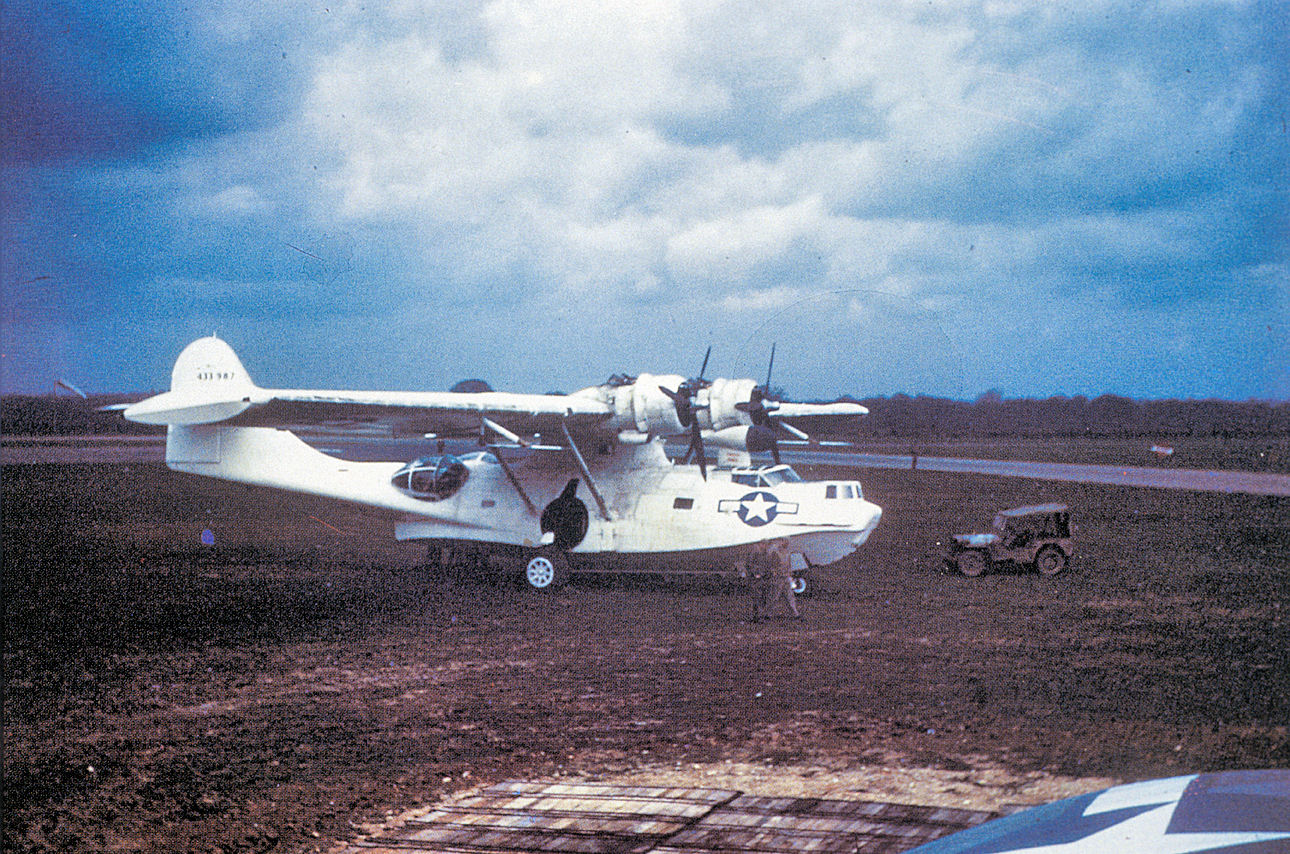
Rescue OA-10A Catalina

==== Training as the first squadron of its kind ====
The group was first activated as the 1st Emergency Rescue Squadron at Boca Raton Army Air Field, Florida on 1 December 1943 with an initial cadre of one officer and four enlisted men. The squadron and the 2d Emergency Rescue Squadron, activated two weeks later in California, were the first of their kind in the Army Air Forces. Two naval officers were attached to the squadron to perform check flights for the pilots, who had received training on the Consolidated PBY-5A Catalina at Naval Air Station Pensacola and Naval Air Station Jacksonville. The training included water landings on Lake Okeechobee and navigation training. After two and a half months of training, the unit departed for overseas assignment. The squadron left for overseas from Camp Patrick Henry, Virginia, sailing on board the SS William L. Mitchell on 3 March.

==== Operations in the Mediterranean ====
The squadron arrived at the port of Casablanca, French Morocco on 12 March and proceeded to the encampment at Camp Don B. Passage. They staged through Sidi Ahmed, Tunisia before arriving at their operational station of Ajaccio, Corsica, France. Meanwhile, crews picked up their Catalinas at Port Lyautey Airfield, French Morocco. The squadron flew its first operational mission from Ajaccio on 10 April. Its first rescue, of a crewmember of a Royal Air Force Vickers Wellington bomber, occurred a week later.

In May 1944, the squadron began a split operation to increase the area in which it could provide rescue coverage. Headquarters and C Flight remained at Ajaccio, while B Flight left for Foggia Main Airfield and A Flight for Grottaglie Airfield, both in Italy. B Flight was attached to 323 Wing of the Royal Air Force for operations. On 10 May the squadron staged a rescue operation from Vis, an island controlled by Yugoslav Partisans in a search for a fighter aircraft downed over Yugoslavia. On 20 May. A Flight performed the first rescue flown from Italy, landing a Catalina a few miles off the coast of Albania to pick up the pilot of an RAF Supermarine Spitfire who had been shot down while attacking a German Q-Ship. B Flight performed its first rescue, of a Consolidated B-24 Liberator crew of the 741st Bombardment Squadron, four days later.

Not only Allied fliers were rescued by the squadron. On 14 June, for the first time, C Flight responded to a distress signal received by a fighter control center. Upon arrival at the signal's location, the crew discovered the source of the signal was from two Luftwaffe fliers. They were retrieved and made the squadron's first capture of prisoners of war.

By July 1944, B Flight acquired a Stinson L-5 Sentinel, which it used for searches of crash sites on land. The squadron was awarded a Distinguished Unit Citation for the period o 17 to 21 August 1944. During this period, with only nine aircraft to cover its area of responsibility, the squadron rescued 21 allied airmen, making open sea landings in hazardous weather conditions and heavy seas.

During the month of October, A Flight temporarily operated from a French naval base. The squadron also added a boat crew to its strength, but this unit was reassigned a month later.

In late December 1944, the squadron and C Flight moved to Foggia. The move to Foggia also brought the assignment of Boeing B-17 Flying Fortresses, transferred from units in Fifteenth Air Force. One month later, most of A and C Flights were detached from the squadron for shipment to the China-Burma-India Theater as the cadre for the 7th Emergency Rescue Squadron, which was being organized at Agartala. With these flights went the squadron's B-17s, although once the 1st was reorganized it again flew the B-17. This reduced the squadron to (new) A Flight at Falconara Airfield and B Flight with the squadron headquarters at Foggia.

==== Return to the United States ====
The last combat rescue performed by the squadron, on 1 May 1945, was also the only one performed by dropping a lifeboat from a B-17 Dumbo. Fighting in Italy ended the following day. After VE Day, A Flight joined the squadron headquarters at Foggia. On 25 May 1945, the squadron left the Mediterranean, assembling at Keesler Field, Mississippi in late June. The squadron spent the next year at Keesler before inactivating in June 1946.

=== Caribbean operations ===
The squadron was activated again as the 1st Rescue Squadron at Howard Field, Panama Canal Zone in November 1946 and assumed responsibility for search and rescue in the Caribbean.

The squadron moved to MacDill Air Force Base, Florida in September 1949 and was assigned to Air Rescue Service. Despite the move, the squadron's area of responsibility (the Caribbean and eastward in the mid-Atlantic to Bermuda) remained the same. At MacDill the squadron became the 1st Air Rescue Squadron. A Flight was located with the squadron until early 1951, when its personnel were distributed to other Air Rescue Service units.

In 1951 the squadron headquarters returned to the Canal Zone, moving to Albrook Air Force Base, where its B Flight was already located. In November 1952 it expanded into the 1st Air Rescue Group. Its three flights, were replaced by squadrons. A and B Flights, both located at Albrook with group headquarters, became the 26th and 27th Air Rescue Squadrons, C Flight at Ramey Air Force Base, Puerto Rico, became the 28th Air Rescue Squadron, and D Flight at Kindley Air Force Base, Bermuda became the 29th Air Rescue Squadron. Less than a year later, in September 1953, the second rescue squadron at Albrook was inactivated. As US operations in the Caribbean were reduced, the group and its remaining squadrons inactivated in December 1956.

=== Patrick Air Force Base ===
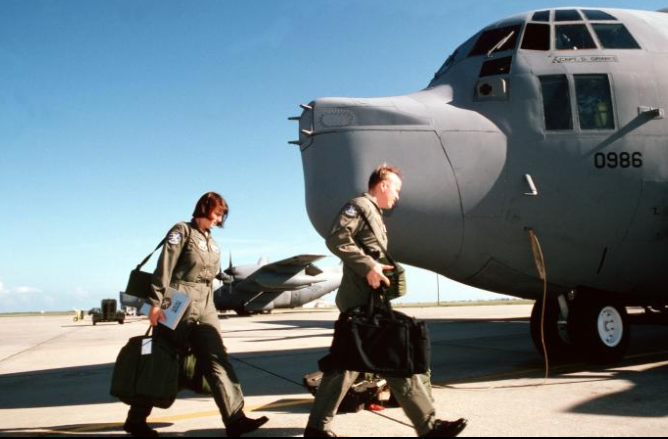
1st Rescue Group crew approaching their HC-130P

In June 1995, the group, now designated the 1st Rescue Group, was activated at Patrick Air Force Base, Florida as the command element for the 41st Rescue Squadron, flying Sikorsky HH-60 Pave Hawk helicopters and the 71st Rescue Squadrons, flying Lockheed HC-130 Hercules tankers, although the group was not manned until the middle of July. The squadrons had previously reported to the 1st Operations Group, stationed at Langley Air Force Base, Virginia.

The group provided rescue, recovery and medical evacuation capability for Space Shuttle launches. It also performed range safety and surveillance for launches on the Eastern Test Range by government and commercial operators. While stationed at Patrick, the group deployed airmen to Southwest Asia. Five members of the group were among those killed in the Khobar Towers bombing.

In April 1997, the group's two flying squadrons moved to Moody Air Force Base, Georgia, where they were reassigned to the 347th Operations Group. Air Combat Command and Air Force Reserve Command had been transitioning the Eastern Test Range support mission to the reserve 301st Rescue Squadron. The group remained behind at Patrick until September 1997, when it was inactivated, as the remaining rescue mission at Patrick was transferred to the reserve 920th Rescue Wing.

=== Expeditionary operations ===
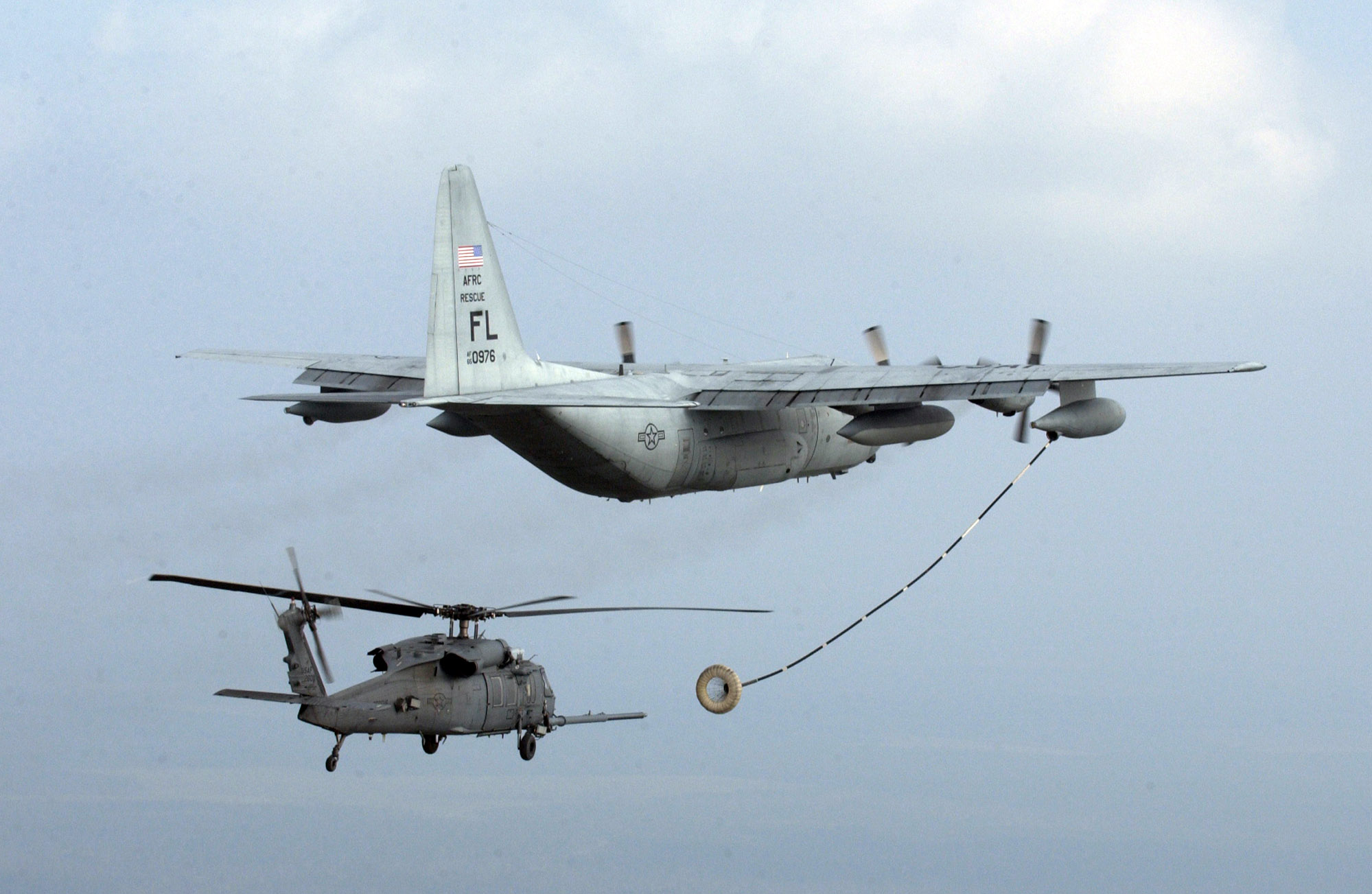
An HC-130P refuels a HH-60 Pave Hawk helicopter

The group was converted to provisional status as the 1st Expeditionary Rescue Group and assigned to Air Combat Command to activate or inactivate as needed in January 2015. In September, the group was activated to support Operation Inherent Resolve, the military operation to degrade ISIL. The need for a rescue capability as part of Inherent Resolve was highlighted by the failure to recover Muath al-Kasasbeh, a Royal Jordanian Air Force pilot, who was captured by ISIL, then tortured and barbarously killed after his fighter crashed in Syria. The US Navy's Helicopter Sea Combat Squadron Five (HSC-5) deployed with the group during 2016 during their deployment with Carrier Air Wing 7 (CVW-7).

== Lineage ==
- Constituted as the 1st Emergency Rescue Squadron on 25 November 1943

Activated on 1 December 1943
Inactivated on 4 June 1946

- Redesignated 1st Rescue Squadron on 26 September 1946

Activated on 1 November 1946

- Redesignated 1st Air Rescue Squadron on 20 August 1950
- Redesignated 1st Air Rescue Group on 14 November 1952

Inactivated on 8 December 1956

- Redesignated 1st Rescue Group on 31 March 1995

Activated on 14 June 1995
Inactivated on 30 September 1997

- Redesignated 1st Expeditionary Rescue Group, converted to provisional status, and assigned to Air Combat Command to activate or inactivate at any time on or after 9 June 2015

Activated on 1 September 2015

=== Assignments ===
- Army Air Forces Eastern Technical Training Command, 1 December 1943
- XII Fighter Command, 12 March 1944 (attached to Mediterranean Allied Coastal Air Force after 14 September 1944)
- Twelfth Air Force, 1 October 1944 (remained attached to Mediterranean Allied Coastal Air Force until 12 May 1945)
- Army Air Forces Western Technical Training Command, 18 June 1945
- Army Air Forces Eastern Technical Training Command, 15 October 1945 – 4 June 1946
- Caribbean Defense Command, 1 November 1946
- 5600th Wing (later 5600th Composite Wing), 26 July 1948
- Caribbean Air Command, 25 April 1949
- Air Rescue Service, 1 September 1949 – 8 December 1956 (attached to Caribbean Air Command after 14 November 1952)
- 1st Fighter Wing, 14 June 1995
- 347th Wing, 1 April – 30 September 1997
- 386th Air Expeditionary Wing, 1 September 2015 – present

=== Components ===
- 26th Air Rescue Squadron (later 26th Expeditionary Rescue Squadron): 14 November 1952 – 8 December 1956, 1 September 2015 – present
- 27th Air Rescue Squadron: 14 November 1952 – 21 September 1953
- 28th Air Rescue Squadron: 14 November 1952 – 8 December 1956
- 29th Air Rescue Squadron: 14 November 1952 – 8 December 1956
- 41st Rescue Squadron: 14 June 1995 – 1 April 1997
- 52d Expeditionary Rescue Squadron, 1 September 2015 – present
- 64th Expeditionary Rescue Squadron, 1 September 2015 – present
- 71st Rescue Squadron: 14 June 1995 – 1 April 1997
- 12th AAF Emergency Rescue Boat Crew, 29 October 1944 – 23 November 1944

=== Stations ===
- Boca Raton Army Air Field, Florida, 1 December 1943 – 18 February 1944
- Camp Don B. Passage, Casablanca, French Morocco, 12 March 1944
- Sidi Ahmed, Tunisia, 29 March 1944
- Ajaccio, Corsica, France, 8 April 1944
- Foggia Main Airfield, Italy, 19 December 1944 – 25 May 1945
- Keesler Field, Mississippi, 18 June 1945 – 4 June 1946
- Howard Field (later Howard Air Force Base), Panama Canal Zone, 1 November 1946
- MacDill Air Force Base, Florida, 1 September 1949 – 15 June 1951
- Albrook Air Force Base, Panama Canal Zone, 15 June 1951 – 8 December 1956
- Patrick Air Force Base, Florida, 14 June 1995 – 30 September 1997
- Undisclosed location in Southwest Asia, 1 September 2015 – present (Note: A Facebook video states this location is Diyarbakir Air Base. "The Rescue Triad". Incirlik Air Base Facebook page. 26 April 2016. Archived from the original on 18 August 2016.)

=== Aircraft ===
- Consolidated OA-10 Catalina (later SA-10), 1944–1945, 1946–1953
- Stinson L-5 Sentinel, 1944–1945, 1947–1953
- North American B-25 Mitchell, 1944–1945
- Boeing B-17 Flying Fortress, 1944–1945
- Boeing TB-17 (later SB-17) Dumbo, 1946–1952
- Douglas C-47 Skytrain, 1946–1950
- Stinson L-1 Vigilant, 1946–1948
- Stinson L-13, 1946–1949
- Sikorsky R-5 (later Sikorsky H-5)-5, 1947–1953
- Fairchild C-82 Packet, 1949–1952
- Boeing SB-29 Super Dumbo, 1952–1956
- Grumman SA-16 Albatross, 1952–1956
- Sikorsky SH-19, 1954–1956
- Douglas SC-54, 1956
- Sikorsky HH-60 Pave Hawk, 1995–1997
- Lockheed C-130 Hercules, 1995–1997
- Lockheed HC-130 Hercules, 1995–1997

=== Awards and campaigns ===
Award streamer	Award	Dates	Notes
	Distinguished Unit Citation	17–21 August 1944	1st Emergency Rescue Squadron, Mediterranean Theater of Operations

Campaign Streamer	Campaign	Dates	Notes
	Rome-Arno	12 March 1944 – 9 September 1944	1st Emergency Rescue Squadron
	Southern France	15 August 1944 – 14 September 1944	1st Emergency Rescue Squadron
	North Apennines	10 September 1944 – 4 April 1945	1st Emergency Rescue Squadron
	Po Valley	3 April 1945 – 8 May 1945	1st Emergency Rescue Squadron
	Rhineland	15 September 1944 – 21 March 1945	1st Emergency Rescue Squadron
	Air Combat, EAME Theater	12 March 1944 – 11 May 1945	1st Emergency Rescue Squadron

== See also ==
- B-17 Flying Fortress units of the United States Army Air Forces
- Joint Personnel Recovery Agency
- List of B-29 Superfortress operators
- List of Douglas C-47 Skytrain operators
- List of Lockheed C-130 Hercules operators
- List of United States Air Force rescue squadrons
- Personnel recovery
