= 26th Expeditionary Rescue Squadron =

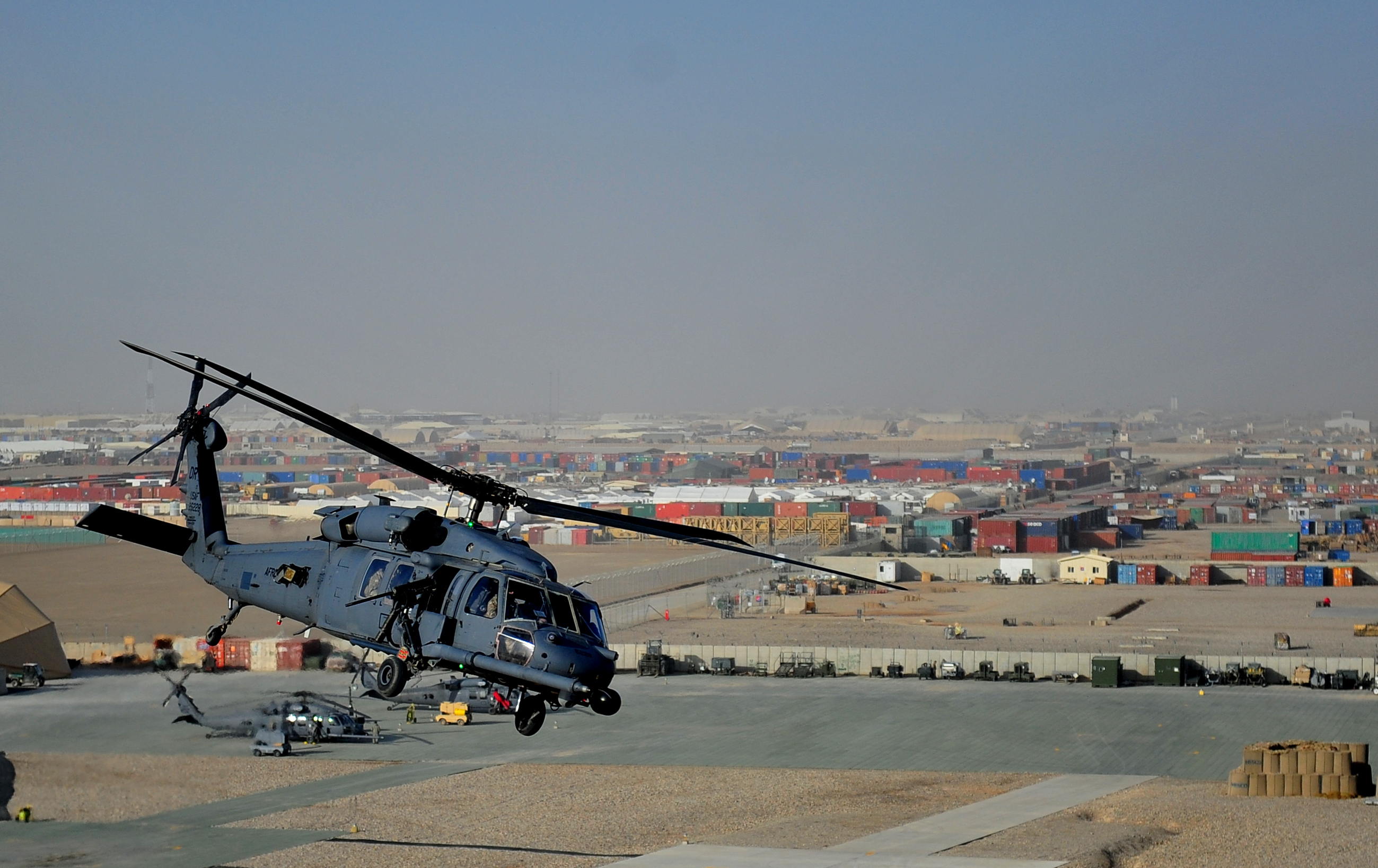
- A squadron HH-60G Pave Hawk over Camp Bastion
- Active: 1952–1956; 2003
- Country: United States
- Branch: United States Air Force
- Role: Search and Rescue
- Part of: Air Combat Command
- Engagements: War in Afghanistan

Insignia
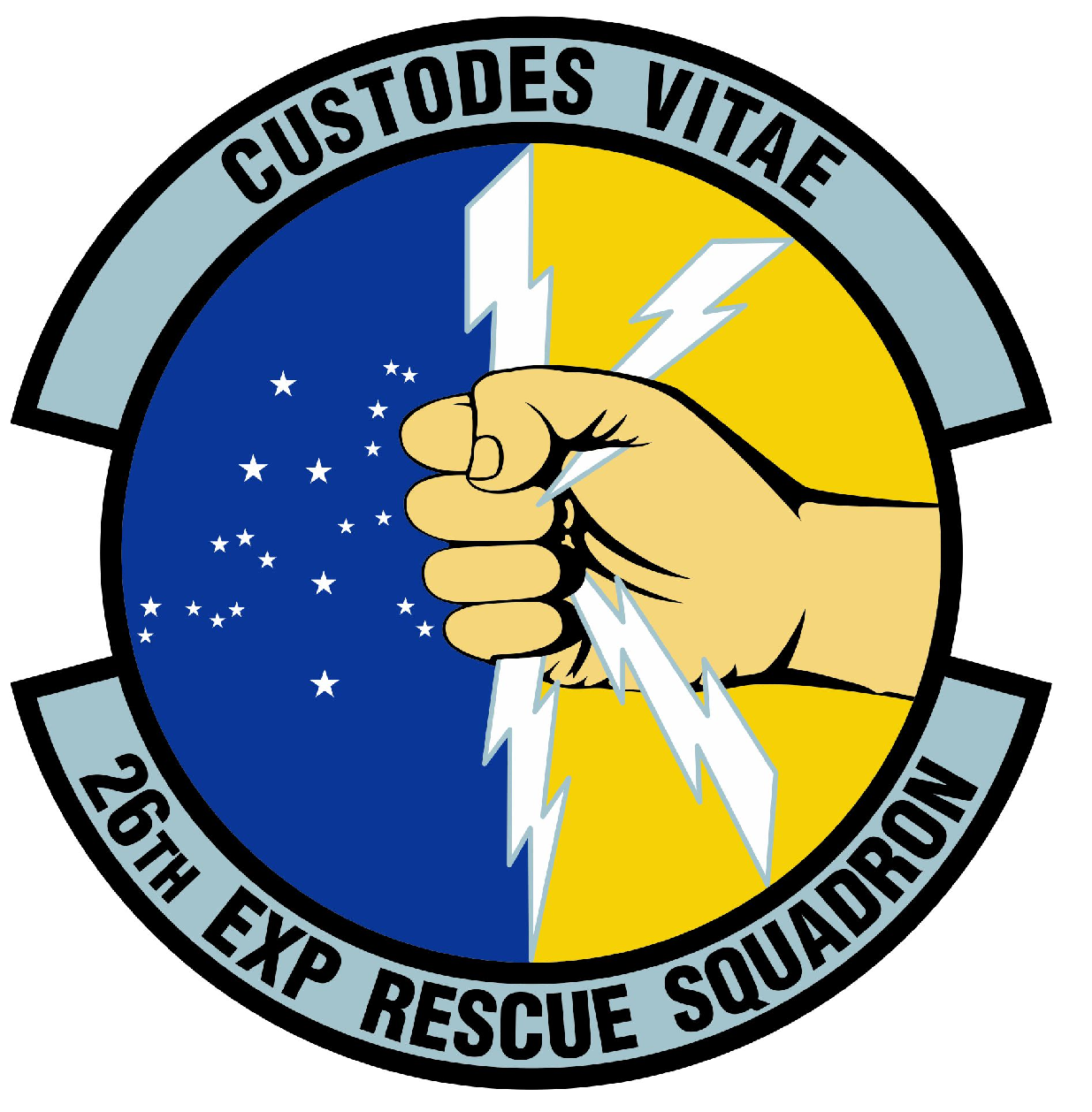
- 26th Expeditionary Rescue Squadron emblem (approved 12 January 2016)

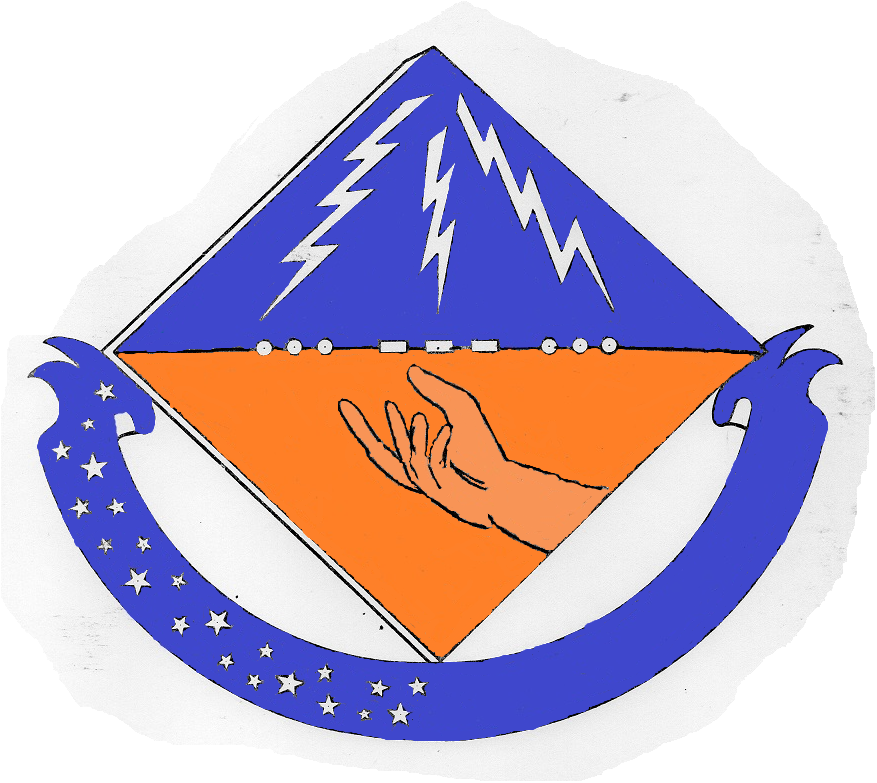
- 26th Air Rescue Squadron emblem (c. 1952-1956)

The 26th Expeditionary Rescue Squadron is a provisional unit of the United States Air Force, assigned to Air Combat Command to activate or inactivate as needed.

The squadron was first activated at Albrook Air Force Base, Panama Canal Zone in November 1952 as the 26th Expeditionary Rescue Group it performed search and rescue missions in the Caribbean for the next four years before inactivating in December 1956. It was converted to provisional status in December 2002.

It is probably now stationed at Diyarbakir Air Base, Diyarbakır Province, Turkey.

== History ==
=== Search and rescue in the Caribbean ===
The squadron activated in November 1952 at Albrook Air Force Base in the Panama Canal Zone as the 26th Air Rescue Squadron when Air Rescue Service expanded its existing rescue squadrons into groups and replaced their existing flights with newly formed squadrons. The 26th absorbed the equipment, personnel and mission of the former Flight A, 1st Air Rescue Squadron, which was simultaneously discontinued. The squadron flew search and rescue and aeromedical evacuation operations primarily over land and water areas around Panama, but extending into Central America and northwestern areas of South America, until it was inactivated in late 1956.

=== Expeditionary operations ===
As an expeditionary unit, the 26th has been activated several times since the September 11 terrorist attacks. The squadron is manned and equipped by deployed airmen from regular, Air National Guard, and reserve rescue units deployed from their home bases.

== Lineage ==
- Constituted as the 26th Air Rescue Squadron on 17 October 1952

Activated on 14 November 1952
Inactivated on 8 December 1956

- Redesignated 26th Expeditionary Rescue Squadron and converted to provisional status on 12 December 2002

Activated on 20 March 2003
Inactivated on 10 September 2003
Activated February 2009
Inactivated 1 January 2014
Activated 1 September 2015

=== Assignments ===
- 1st Air Rescue Group (attached to Caribbean Air Command for operational control), 14 November 1952 – 8 December 1956
- Air Combat Command to activate or inactivate at any time after 12 December 2002

438th Air Expeditionary Wing, 20 March–10 September 2003
451st Expeditionary Operations Group, February 2009
651st Air Expeditionary Group, 29 June 2011 – 1 January 2014
1st Expeditionary Rescue Group, 1 September 2015 – present

=== Stations ===
- Albrook Air Force Base, Panama Canal Zone, 14 November 1952 – 8 December 1956
- Jacobabad, Pakistan, 20 March–10 September 2003
- Camp Bastion, Afghanistan, February 2009 – 1 January 2014
- Southwest Asia, 1 September 2015 – present

=== Aircraft ===
- Grumman SA-16 Albatross, 1952-1956
- Sikorsky H-5, 1952-1954
- Sikorsky H-19, 1954-1956
- Sikorsky SH-19, 1954-1956
- HH-60 Pave Hawk, unknown
