= 301st Rescue Squadron =

301st Rescue Squadron

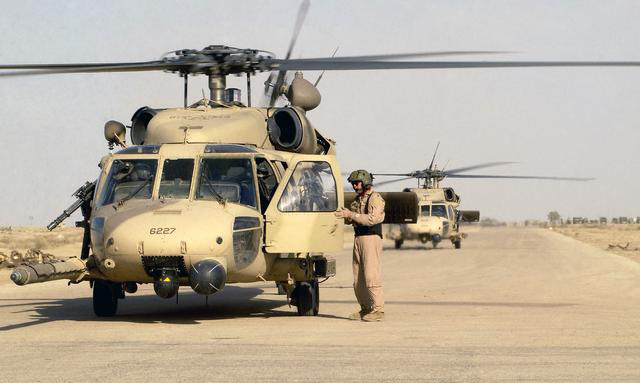
- Squadron HH-60 Pave Hawks at Tallil Air Base
- Active: 1956–present
- Country: United States
- Branch: United States Air Force
- Role: Search and Rescue
- Part of: Air Force Reserve Command
- Garrison/HQ: Patrick Space Force Base
- Motto: Guardian Wings
- Decorations: Air Force Outstanding Unit Award

Insignia
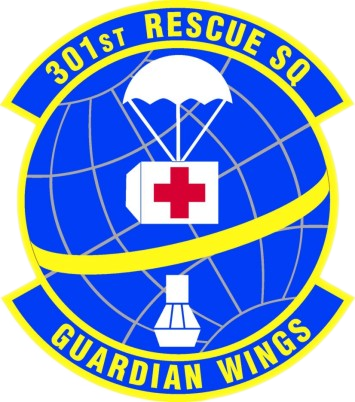
- 301st Rescue Squadron emblem (approved 23 January 2002)

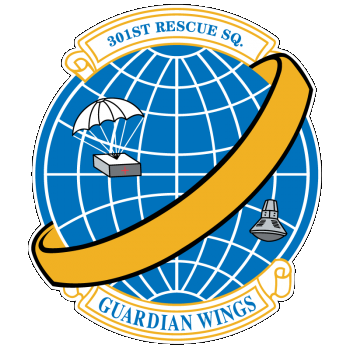
- 301st Air Rescue Squadron emblem (approved 2 December 1963)

The 301st Rescue Squadron is an Air Force Reserve Command unit, part of the 920th Rescue Wing at Patrick Space Force Base, Florida. The squadron operates the HH-60W Jolly Green II helicopter, conducting both peacetime and combat search and rescue missions. As a reserve unit, it is operationally-gained by the Air Combat Command (ACC).

== History ==
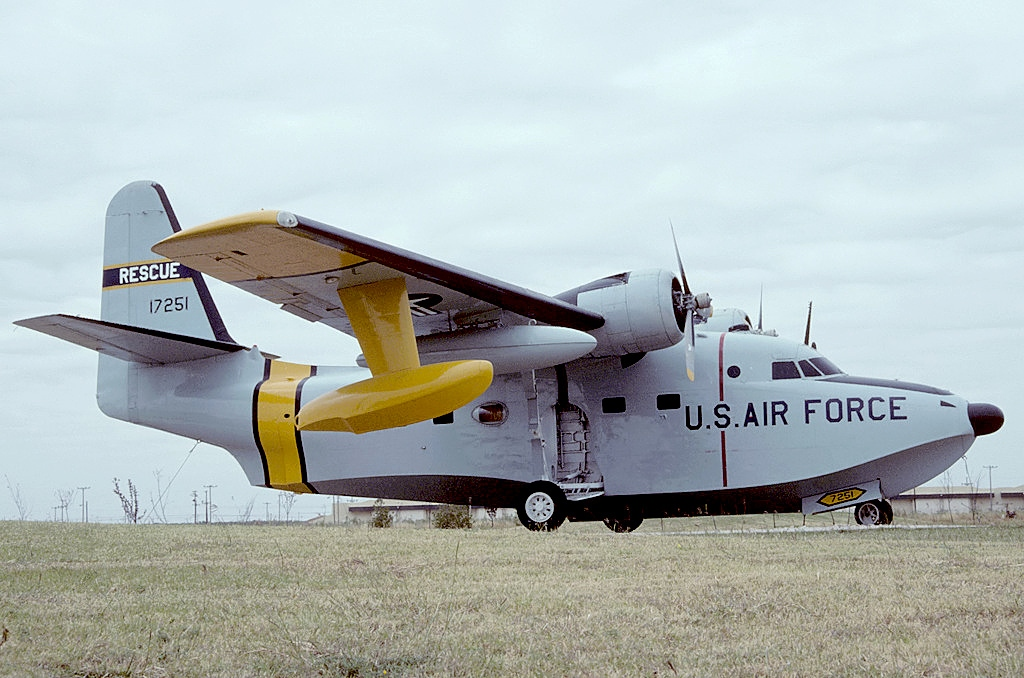
Grumman HU-16B Albatross

The 301st was originally activated in August 1956 at Miami International Airport, Florida as an amphibious aircraft unit, equipped with the SA-16 (later HU-16) Albatross and began training for combat search and rescue missions. The 301st performed search and rescue and medical evacuation missions primarily over land areas and in the Atlantic and Caribbean waters off Florida. It was the first of five rescue squadrons established by Continental Air Command in the Air Force Reserve in the 1950s. In January 1957, the squadron performed the first rescue by a reserve unit. In 1960, the Air Force moved its Air Force Reserve units from Miami International Airport, which had become one of the busiest commercial airports in the world, to nearby Homestead Air Force Base, located south of Miami. From Homestead, the squadron began participating in NASA's manned space flight rescue contingency operations for Project Mercury at Cape Canaveral Air Force Station beginning with Freedom 7, the first manned Mercury launch, in 1961.

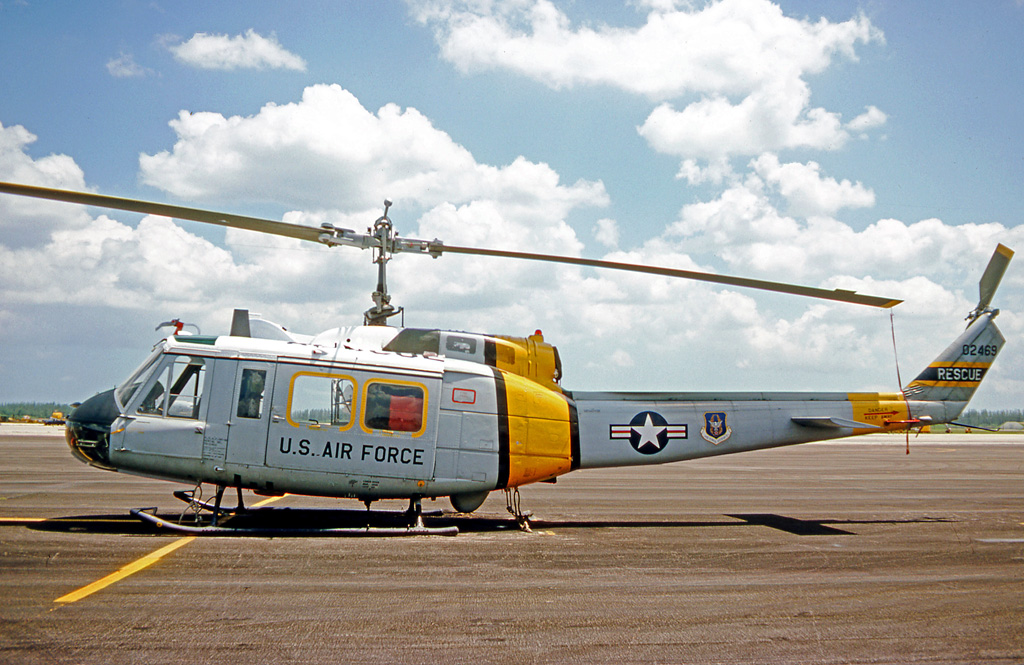
Bell HH-1H of the then-301 ARRS

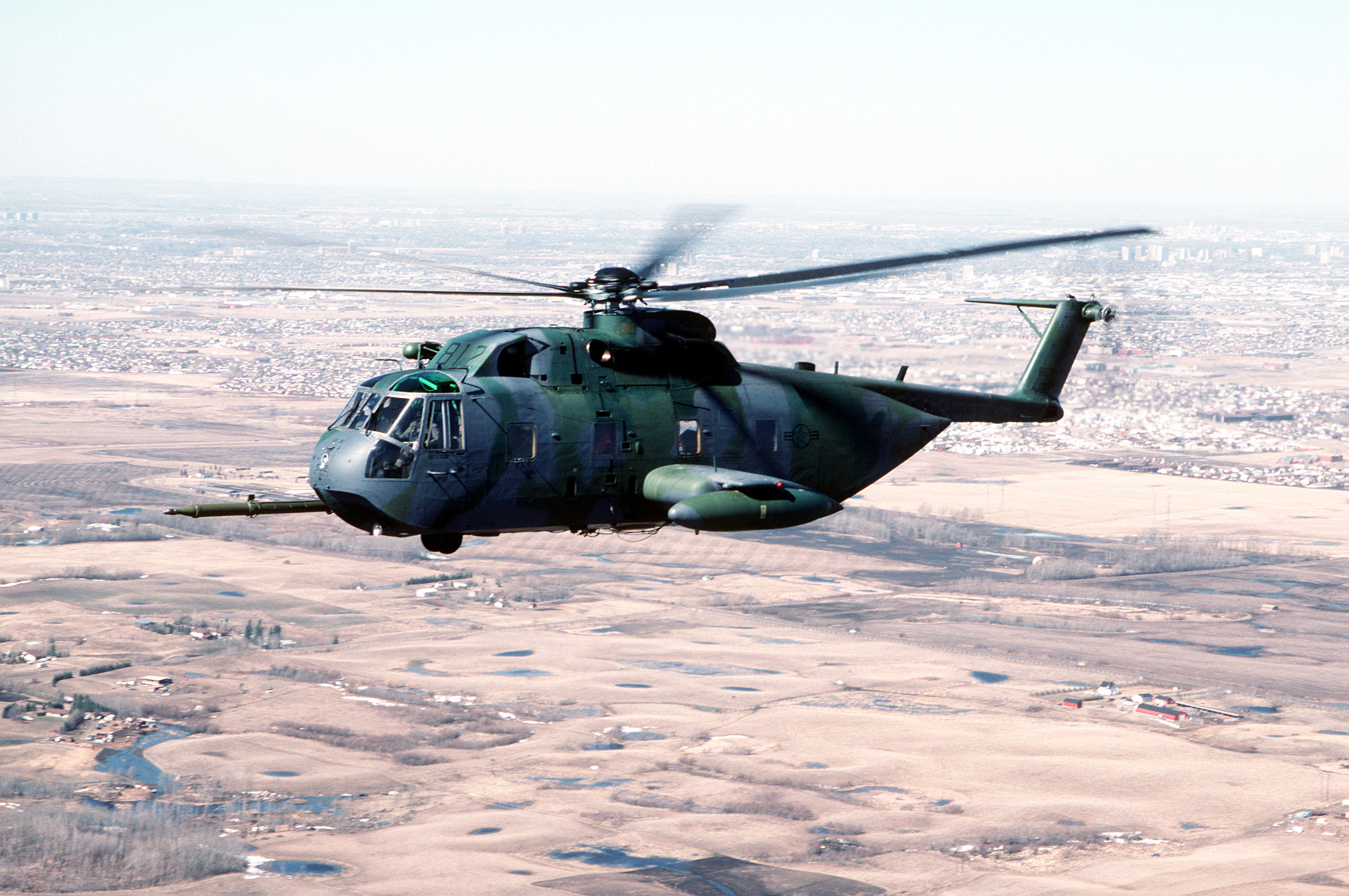
Sikorsky HH-3E Jolly Green Giant helicopter, circa 1988.

In the 1970s, the squadron acquired helicopters, adding former Sikorsky SH-34J Seabat helicopters from the U.S. Navy in 1971. The aircraft were stripped of their antisubmarine warfare gear and redesignated Sikorsky HH-34J. The squadron became an all-helicopter unit in 1973 when it added Bell HH-1 Hueys and lost its remaining Albatross amphibians. The Hueys also provided support for the U.S. Air Force Water Survival School at Homestead during training events in Biscayne Bay.

In 1974, the squadron began to operate HH-3E Jolly Green Giant helicopters, which had an in-flight air refueling capability. The squadron became a composite unit in 1979 when it added HC-130P/N Hercules aircraft to refuel its HH-3Es.

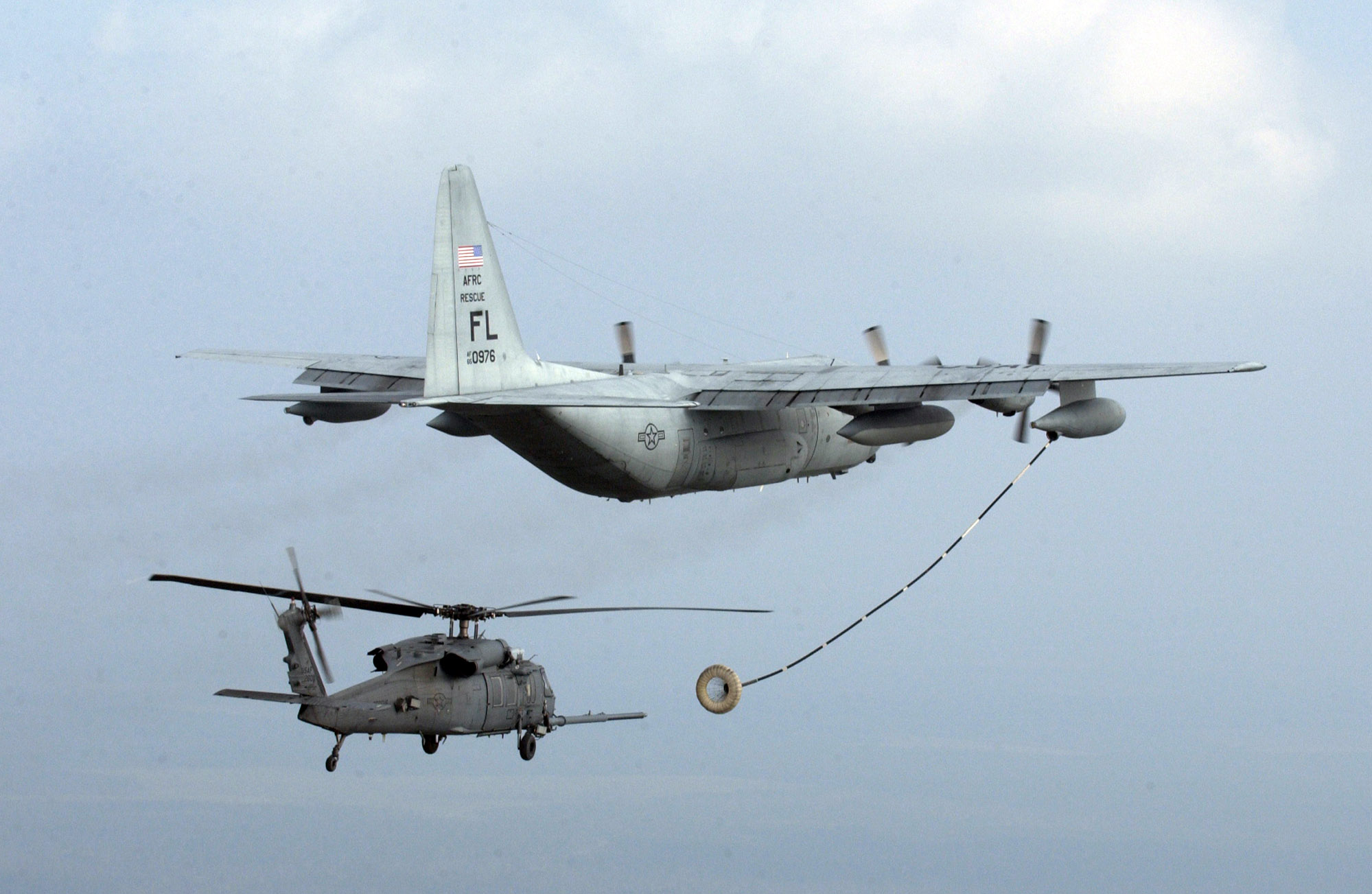
39th Rescue Squadron HC-130P/N Hercules COMBAT KING aircraft refueling a 301st Rescue Squadron HH-60G Pave Hawk helicopter. Both squadrons are assigned to the 920th Rescue Wing at Patrick Space Force Base, Florida.

Following on its support of Project Mercury, Project Gemini and Project Apollo, the squadron began to provide rescue coverage for NASA Space Shuttle launches in 1981, augmenting the active duty Air Force's 41st Rescue Squadron at Patrick. The 301st subsequently added additional launch support for unmanned space missions originating from the Eastern Space and Missile Center (ESMC), later renamed the 45th Space Wing, in 1993. HH-60G Pave Hawks replaced the HH-3E Jolly Greens in 1991.

Prior Hurricane Andrew striking south Florida in August 1992, the squadron evacuated all its flyable aircraft from Homestead to Patrick. Following the storm's landfall, the squadron rescued 137 residents during the subsequent 18-day humanitarian operation. However, Andrew also devastated the 301st's home station facilities at Homestead and it performed these rescues while operating from expeditionary facilities at Tamiami Airport, Florida. Within a few months, the Air Force determined not to return the 301st to Homestead, and in January 1993 permanently moved it further north in Florida to Patrick AFB. After the move, on one day in March 1993, the unit saved 93 elderly residents from rising flood waters at their Tampa area retirement community.

In 1997, the Air Force split the organizational structure of its composite rescue units. The portion of the 301st flying the HH-60G was retained as the 301st Rescue Squadron and it became a helicopter unit again. The HC-130P/N portion of the squadron became the 39th Rescue Squadron and the pararescue portion became the 308th Rescue Squadron (308 RQS). The three squadrons formed the operational element of the then-920th Rescue Group at Patrick AFB, which functioned as a geographically separated unit (GSU) of the then-939th Rescue Wing at Portland Air Reserve Station, Oregon. With disestablishment of the 939 RQW, the 920 RQG was redesignated as the 920th Rescue Wing (920 RQW) and the squadron reported to the newly-formed 920th Operations Group (920 OG).

The 301st has deployed crews to provide search and rescue coverage worldwide, including to the Gulf Coast in 2005 following Hurricane Katrina, to Naval Air Station Keflavík, Iceland; to Southwest Asia during and after both the first Gulf War and Operation Desert Storm, to Camp Lemonier, Djibouti, and elsewhere in the Persian Gulf region since 1993.

The 301 RQS received its first HH-60W Jolly Green II on 1 February 2024, and the squadron divested its final two HH-60G on 8 September 2025.

== Lineage ==
- Constituted as the 301st Air Rescue Squadron on 9 March 1956

Activated in the reserve on 18 August 1956

- Redesignated 301st Aerospace Rescue and Recovery Squadron on 18 January 1966
- Redesignated 301st Air Rescue Squadron, 1 April 1990
- Redesignated 301st Rescue Squadron on 1 February 1992

=== Assignments ===
- 2585th Air Reserve Flying Training Center, 18 August 1956
- 2586th Air Reserve Flying Training Center, 2 June 1958
- 14th Air Force, 25 June 1960
- 3rd Air Force Reserve Region, 15 July 1960
- Eastern Air Force Reserve Region, 31 December 1969
- Western Air Force Reserve Region, 1 January 1972
- 403d Aerospace Rescue and Recovery Wing (later 403d Rescue and Weather Reconnaissance Wing), 15 March 1976
- 939th Aerospace Rescue and Recovery Group (later 939th Air Rescue Wing, 939th Rescue Wing), 1 October 1987
- 939th Operations Group, 1 August 1992
- 920th Rescue Group, 15 April 1997
- 920th Operations Group, 1 April 2003 – present

=== Stations ===
- Miami International Airport, Florida, 18 August 1956
- Homestead Air Force Base, Florida, 1 August 1960 (operated from Tamiami Airport, Florida, August – December 1992)
- Patrick Space Force Base, Florida, January 1993 – present

=== Aircraft ===
- Grumman SA-16 / HU-16 Albatross (1956–1973)
- Sikorsky HH-34 (1971–1974, 1975)
- Bell HH-1 Huey (1973–1979)
- Sikorsky HH-3 Jolly Green Giant (1974–1991)
- Lockheed HC-130 Hercules (1979–1997)
- Sikorsky CH-3 Jolly Green Giant (1987–1991)
- HH-60 Pave Hawk (1991–2025)
- HH-60W Jolly Green II (2024–present)
