= 308th Rescue Squadron =

308th Rescue Squadron

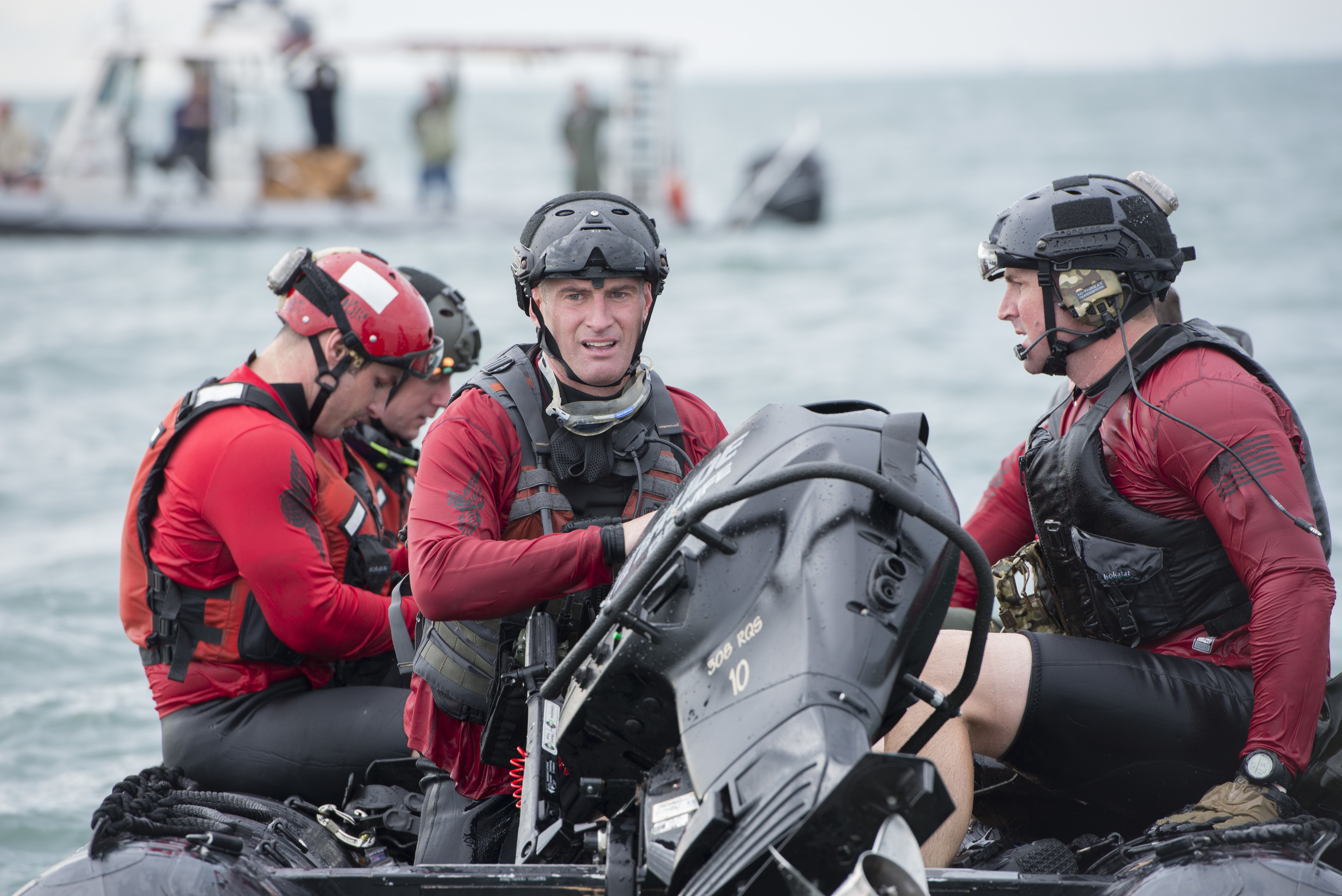
- Members of the 308th Rescue Squadron seen during an astronaut recovery exercise.
- Active: 2005–present
- Country: United States
- Branch: United States Air Force
- Role: Search and Rescue
- Mottos: "These Things We Do, That Others May Live."
- Decorations: Air Force Outstanding Unit Award

Insignia
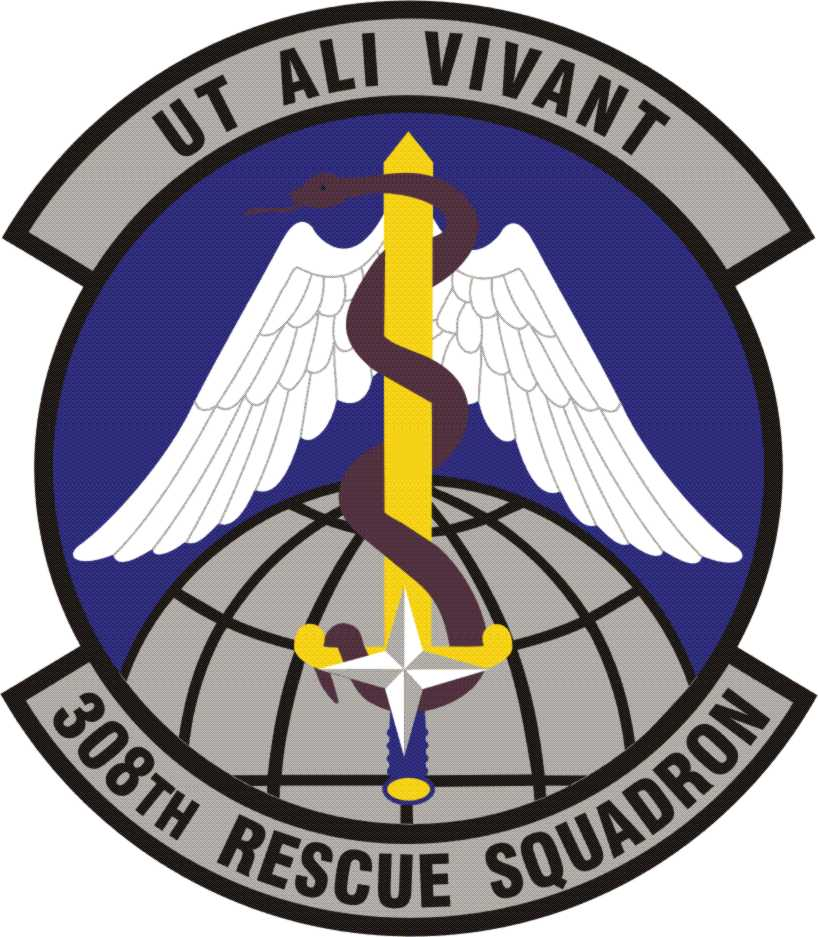
- 308th Rescue Squadron emblem (approved 12 May 2005)

The 308th Rescue Squadron is an Air Force Reserve Command combat search and rescue unit located at Patrick Space Force Base, Florida. The squadron is assigned to the 920th Rescue Wing at Patrick Space Force Base, Florida.

== Mission ==
The peacetime mission of the 308th is to train and maintain rescue capability for Department of Defense personnel, humanitarian and disaster relief activities. The 308th's wartime mission is to provide combat rescue capabilities to recover downed aircrew members and isolated personnel. They can provide this capability under the harshest of circumstances to include, day/night, inclement weather and all terrain rescue conditions.

The squadron consists of Combat Rescue Officers and enlisted Pararescuemen, the latter known as PJs. While many CROs and PJs enter the 920th from the active duty Air Force, others are accessed directly into the Air Force Reserve. CRO and PJ Candidates must pass a physical assessment test which has about 15% success rate. An average of eighty people Air Force-wide enter the 2-year CRO / PJ training program each year. The CRO / PJ team, along with enlisted Survival, Evasion, Resistance and Escape (SERE) experts, is collectively known as GUARDIAN ANGEL.

=== Astronaut recovery ===
The 308th was responsible for recovery of astronauts landed in US spacecraft off American shore. For that mission, the squadron will have 3 teams ready.

During ascent for Starliner, Dragon, and Orion, the 308th Rescue Squadron will have two teams stationed along the east coast of the United States, one at Patrick Space Force Base (just South of the Cape) and the other in Charleston, South Carolina. The Patrick team, Rescue 1, will be responsible for on-pad aborts that place a capsule in the water or for aborts in the first couple minutes of flight that place the capsule within a 200 nautical mile zone from the Cape. After that distance is exceeded, the Charleston crew (Rescue 2) would be responsible for rescue of a launch-aborting crew vehicle anywhere else across the Atlantic.The third team, stationed in Hawai’i, (also part of Rescue 2) would be responsible for any after-launch immediate landing need or off-nominal Station return contingency that places a Starliner or Dragon in the Pacific. If an off-nominal from orbit return occurred with splashdown in the Atlantic, an emergency ocean return within 200 nautical miles of Cape Canaveral would fall to Rescue 1. Any other Atlantic splashdown would fall to Rescue 2 from Charleston because they have more powerful aircraft that could reach Starliner or Dragon or Orion quicker than the Patrick support craft.

Rescue 1 carries a requirement to have a crew en route back to land within 6 hours of splashdown. Rescue 2 carries a requirement to have the hatch on a capsule opened within 24 hours of splashdown and a crew evacuated (via helicopter or ship) from the sea landing area within 72 hours of hatch open.

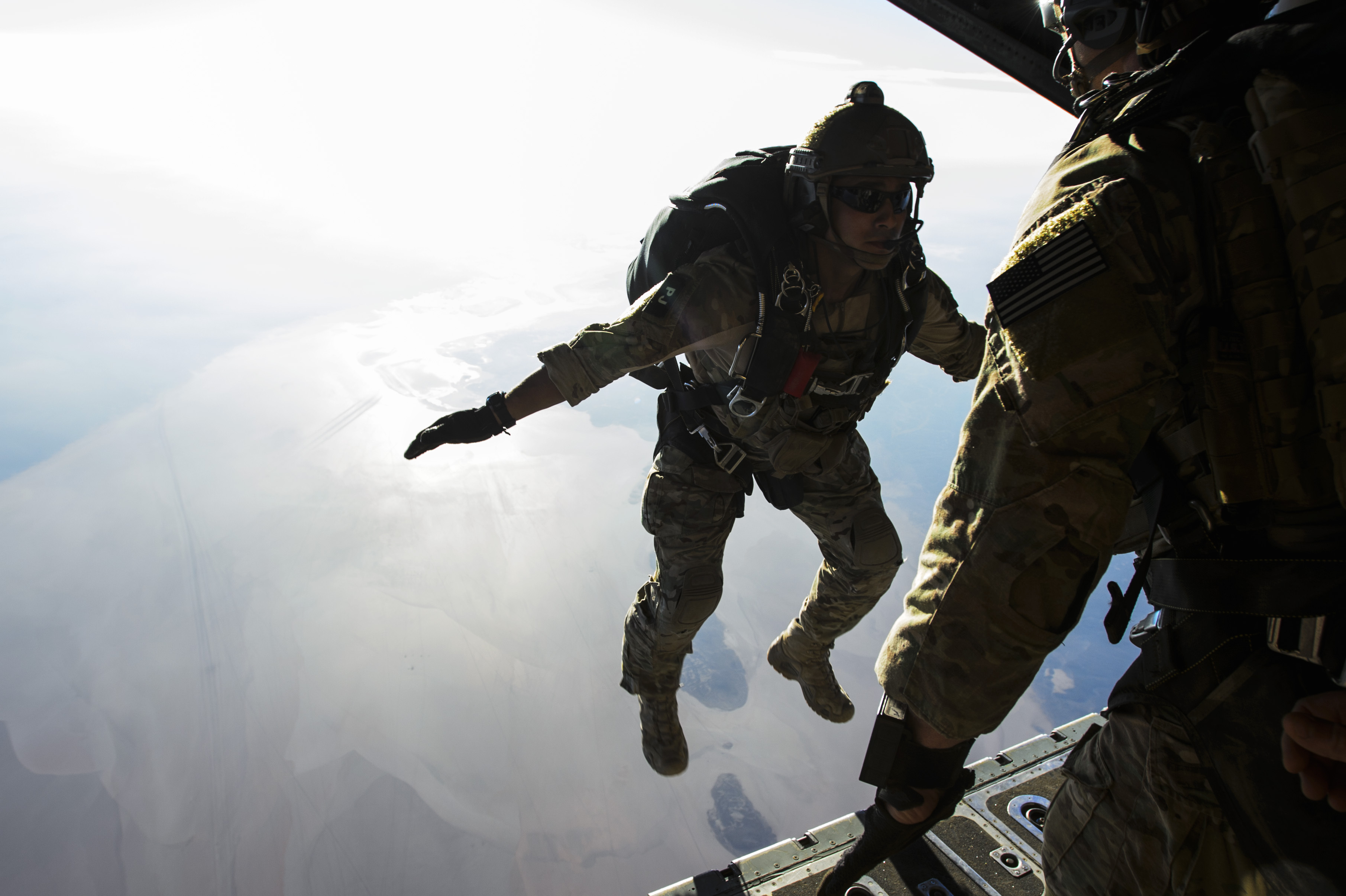
308th RQS Pararescueman Senior Airman Tomes jumps from a HC-130 near Camp Lemonnier, Djibouti

== History ==
The 308th trained for combat search and rescue (CSAR) capability from its inception. The 308th was activated in the Reserves on 12 February 2005. Since 2005, personnel from the 308th RQS have deployed in support of Operation Enduring Freedom and Operation Iraqi Freedom.

During August 2017, the squadron was deployed to Texas after Hurricane Harvey devastated the "Lone Star State". The pararescuemen from the 308th were credited in saving dozens of lives from flooded areas in the state.

On March 15, 2018, 308th RQS Pararescuemen, Master Sgt. William Posch and Staff Sgt. Carl Enis were among seven Airmen killed when their HH-60G Pave Hawk helicopter crashed in Iraq.

On June 14, 2019, 308th RQS Pararescueman Tech. Sgt. Nick Torres received two bronze star medals for providing critical first aid to injured friendly forces whilst under enemy fire during two separate deployments to Afghanistan.

== Lineage ==
- Constituted as the 308th Rescue Squadron on 13 January 2005

Activated in the reserve on 12 February 2005

=== Assignments ===
- 920th Operations Group, 12 February 2005 – present

=== Stations ===
- Patrick Space Force Base, Florida, 12 February 2005 – present

=== Aircraft ===
- Sikorsky HH-60 Pave Hawk (1995–present)
