= 920th Rescue Wing =

920th Rescue Wing

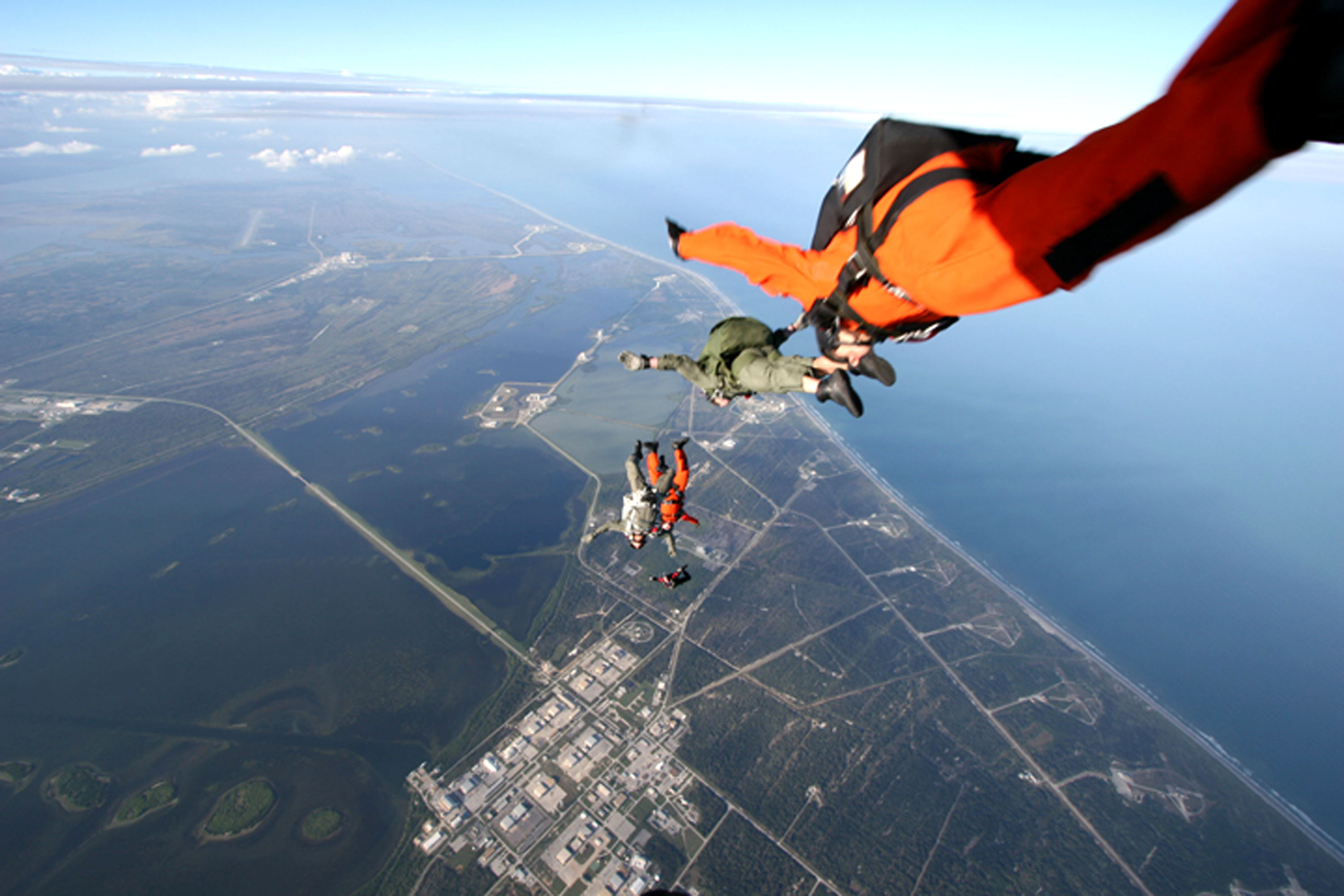
- Members of the 920th Rescue Wing conducting freefall training over Cape Canaveral Air Force Station
- Active: 1963–1965; 1973–1983; 1997–present
- Country: United States
- Branch: United States Air Force
- Type: Wing
- Role: Combat search and Rescue
- Size: 2,500 personnel
- Part of: Air Force Reserve Command
- Garrison/HQ: Patrick Space Force Base, Florida
- Decorations: Air Force Outstanding Unit Award

Commanders
- Commander: Col. John C. Bissell
- Deputy Commander: Col. Amy Meier
- Command Chief: CCM James Loper

Insignia
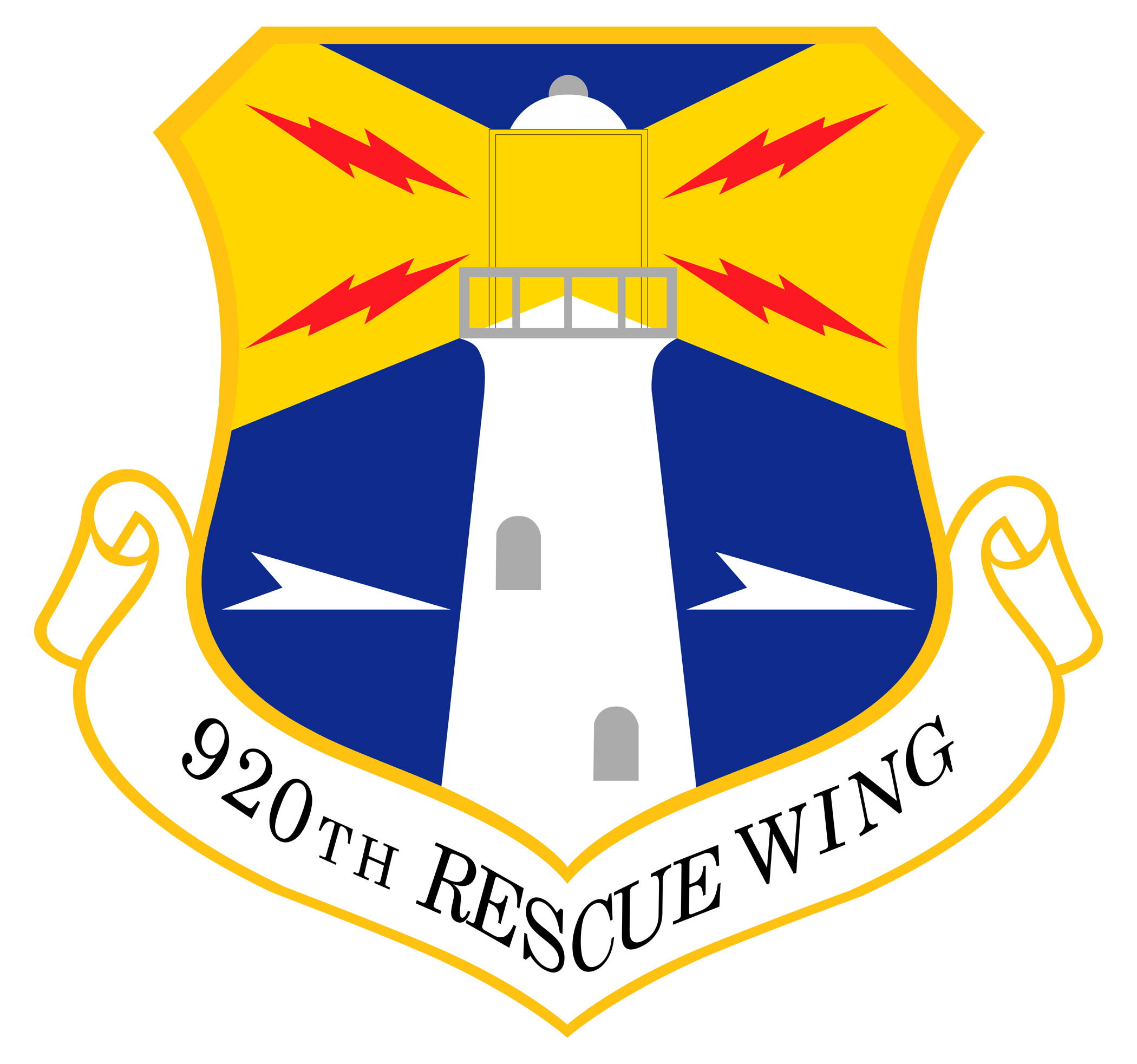
- 920th Rescue Wing emblem (approved 26 September 1984)

Aircraft flown
- Multirole helicopter: HH-60W Jolly Green II
- Transport: HC-130J; COMBAT KING II

The 920th Rescue Wing (920th RQW) is part of the Air Force Reserve Command (AFRC) of the United States Air Force. The wing is assigned to the Tenth Air Force of the Air Force Reserve Command (AFRC).

The 920th Rescue Wing is stationed at Patrick Space Force Base, Florida, with additional geographically separated units consisting of the 943d Rescue Group (943d RQG) at Davis-Monthan Air Force Base, Arizona; the 304th Rescue Squadron (304th RQS) at Portland International Airport, Oregon; and the 920th Aerospace Medicine Squadron (920th AMDS) at Joint Base Langley-Eustis, Virginia. When mobilized to active duty, the wing is operationally gained by the Air Combat Command (ACC).

== Overview ==
Headquartered at Patrick Space Force Base, Florida, the 920th RQW is AFRC's premier combat search and rescue (CSAR) unit. The wing consists of over 2,500 combat rescue Airmen, trained and equipped to locate and recover U.S. Armed Forces personnel during both peacetime and wartime military operations. Additional missions have included crewed spaceflight support, such as providing rescue support for NASA Space Shuttle missions during that program's operation; providing search and rescue support for civilians who are lost or in distress over land or at sea; and lending support in humanitarian and disaster relief operations with the wing's HH-60G Pave Hawk and, until December 2019, HC-130P/N Hercules COMBAT KING aircraft. With retirement of its last HC-130P/N, the 920th RQW transitioned to the HC-130J COMBAT KING II, with the wing's first HC-130J arrived on 2 April 2020.

The 920th RQW has initiated the retirement of its HH-60G Pave Hawk helicopters, replacing them with the HH-60W Jolly Green Giant II.

In addition to its three aircraft squadrons, two in Florida and one with its subordinate 943 RQG in Arizona, the 920th RQW has three Guardian Angel rescue squadrons in Florida, Arizona and Oregon consisting of Combat Rescue Officers and enlisted Pararescuemen, the latter known as PJs. While many CROs and PJs enter the 920th from the active duty Air Force, others are accessed directly into the Air Force Reserve. CRO and PJ Candidates must pass a physical assessment test which has about 15% success rate. An average of eighty people Air Force-wide enter the 2-year CRO / PJ training program each year. The CRO / PJ team, along with enlisted Survival, Evasion, Resistance and Escape (SERE) experts, is collectively known as GUARDIAN ANGEL.

The 920th RQW was involved in the famous 'Lone Survivor' Operation Red Wings mission, that rescued Navy SEAL Marcus Luttrell in Afghanistan and helped in the recovery operation to retrieve the remains of Luttrell's fallen SEAL team. Since 1956, the 920th RQW and its predecessor organizations have saved more than 3,900 lives, including 850 combat rescues and 3,000 peacetime rescues, such as the 1043 lives the wing saved during Hurricanes Katrina and Rita.

== Units ==
- 920th Operations Group – Patrick SFB, Fl

39th Rescue Squadron – HC-130J
301st Rescue Squadron – HH-60G
308th Rescue Squadron – GUARDIAN ANGEL
920th Operations Support Squadron

- 920th Maintenance Group – Patrick SFB, Fl

920th Maintenance Squadron
920th Aircraft Maintenance Squadron
920th Maintenance Operations Flight

- 920th Mission Support Group – Patrick SFB, Fl

920th Mission Support Squadron
920th Security Forces Squadron
920th Communications Flight
920th Logistics Readiness Flight

- 920th Aeromedical Staging Squadron - Patrick SFB, Fl
- 920th Aerospace Medicine Squadron - Langley, VA

Joint Base Langley-Eustis, Virginia

- 943rd Rescue Group – Davis-Monthan AFB

305th Rescue Squadron – HH-60G
306th Rescue Squadron – GUARDIAN ANGEL
943d Aerospace Medicine Squadron
943d Maintenance Squadron
943d Mission Support Flight
943d Operations Support Flight

Geographically Separated Unit (GSU) – Portland International Airport

304th Rescue Squadron – GUARDIAN ANGEL

== Operations ==
NASA crewed space flight support:

- Project Mercury (1961–1963)
- Project Gemini (1965–1966)
- Project Apollo (1968–1972)
- Project Skylab (1973–1974)
- Apollo-Soyuz Test Project (1975)
- Space Transportation System (Space Shuttle) (1981–2011)

Disaster relief:

- Hurricane Andrew Relief Operations (1992)
- Hurricane Katrina Relief Operations (2005)

== History ==
=== Need for reserve troop carrier groups ===
During the first half of 1955, the Air Force began detaching Air Force Reserve squadrons from their parent wing locations to separate sites. The concept offered several advantages. Communities were more likely to accept the smaller squadrons than the large wings and the location of separate squadrons in smaller population centers would facilitate recruiting and manning. Continental Air Command (ConAC)'s plan called for placing Air Force Reserve units at fifty-nine installations located throughout the United States. When these relocations were completed in 1959, reserve wing headquarters and wing support elements would typically be on one base, along with one (or in some cases two) of the wing's flying squadrons, while the remaining flying squadrons were spread over thirty-five Air Force, Navy and civilian airfields under what was called the Detached Squadron Concept.

Although this dispersal was not a problem when the entire wing was called to active service, mobilizing a single flying squadron and elements to support it proved difficult. This weakness was demonstrated in the partial mobilization of reserve units during the Berlin Crisis of 1961 To resolve this, at the start of 1962, ConAC determined to reorganize its reserve wings by establishing groups with support elements for each of its troop carrier squadrons. This reorganization would facilitate mobilization of elements of wings in various combinations when needed. However, as this plan was entering its implementation phase, another partial mobilization occurred for the Cuban Missile Crisis, with the units being released on 22 November 1962. The formation of troop carrier groups occurred in January 1963 for units that had not been mobilized, but was delayed until February for those that had been.

=== Activation of 920th Troop Carrier Group ===
As a result, the 920th Troop Carrier Group was established at Memphis Municipal Airport, Tennessee, on 11 February 1963 as the headquarters for the 702d Troop Carrier Squadron, which had been stationed there since November 1957. Along with group headquarters, a Combat Support Squadron, Materiel Squadron and a Tactical Infirmary were organized to support the 702d.

The group's mission was to organize, recruit and train Air Force Reserve personnel in the tactical airlift of airborne forces, their equipment and supplies and delivery of these forces and materials by airdrop, landing or cargo extraction systems. The group was equipped with Fairchild C-123 Providers for Tactical Air Command airlift operations.

The 920th was one of three groups assigned to the 445th Troop Carrier Wing in 1963, the others being the 918th Troop Carrier Group at Dobbins Air Force Base, Georgia, and the 919th Troop Carrier Group at Memphis Municipal Airport, Tennessee. The group continued training with C-123s at Memphis until it was inactivated in 1965.

=== Tactical airlift and weather reconnaissance ===
In 1973, the group was again activated at Keesler Air Force Base, Mississippi, as the 920th Tactical Airlift Group and equipped with Lockheed C-130 Hercules aircraft as part of the 459th Tactical Airlift Wing. In 1973, it was redesignated as the 920th Weather Reconnaissance Group flying weather reconnaissance missions with WC-130H Hercules aircraft, including flying into hurricanes as "Hurricane Hunter" aircraft from 1976 to 1983 as part of the 403d Rescue and Weather Reconnaissance Wing at Keesler AFB. The 920th Weather Reconnaissance Group inactivated in 1983 and its mission was assumed by the 815th Weather Reconnaissance Squadron within the 403d Rescue and Weather Reconnaissance Wing.

=== Air rescue / combat search and rescue ===
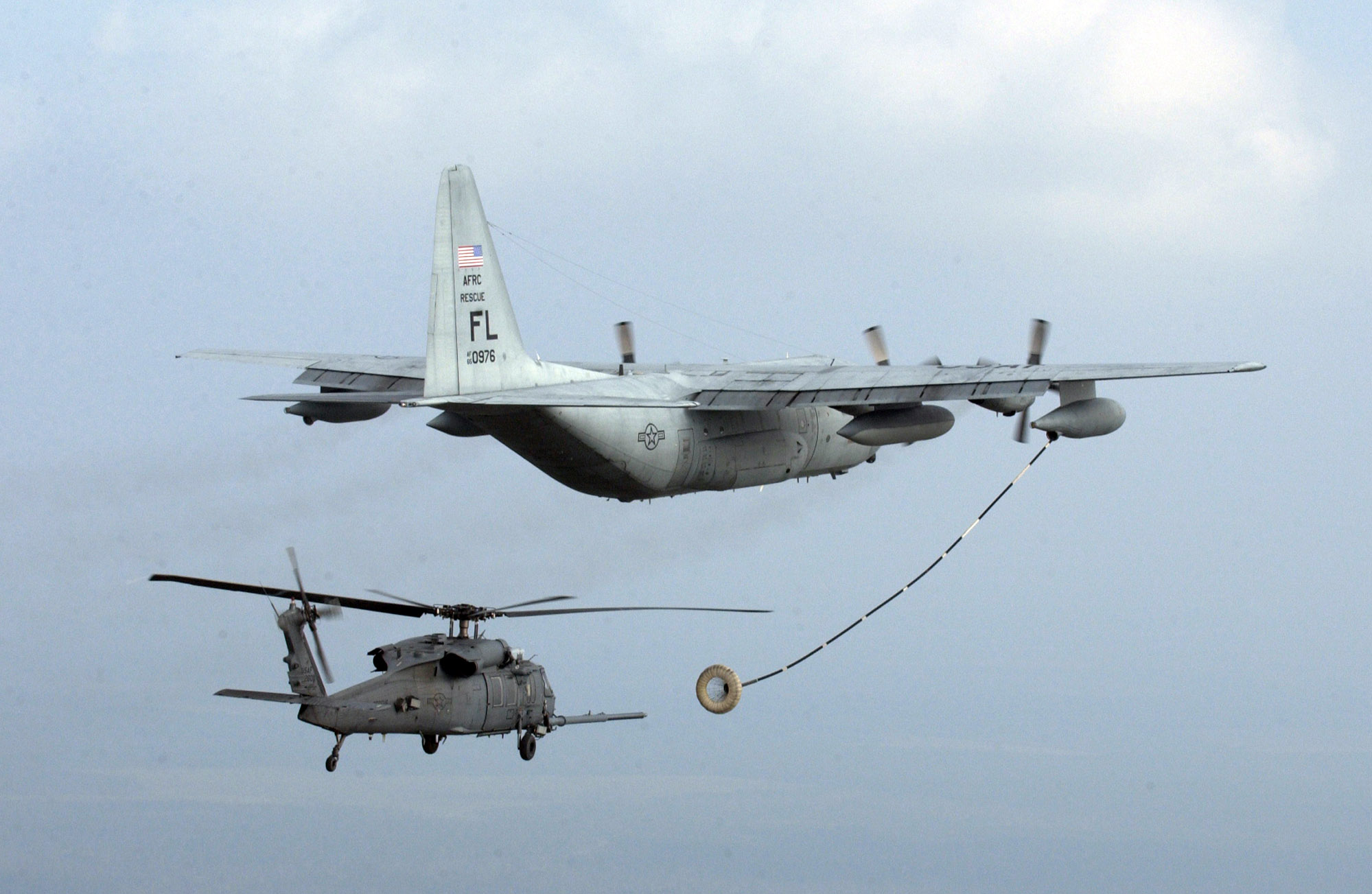
One of the 920th Rescue Wing's HC-130P Hercules "Combat King" aircraft refuels one of the wing's HH-60G Pave Hawk helicopters.

In January 1993, the 301st Rescue Squadron (301 RQS), a geographically separated unit (GSU) of the 939th Rescue Wing (939 RQW) at Portland Air Reserve Station, Oregon, moved from its former home station at Homestead Air Force Base, which had been devastated by Hurricane Andrew, to Patrick Air Force Base. In one day in March 1993, the 301 RQS saved 93 elderly residents from rising flood waters at their Tampa area retirement community. In coordination with the U.S. Coast Guard and the Air Force Rescue Coordination Center (AFRCC), the squadron's HC-130P and HH-60G aircraft routinely searched the Caribbean for downed aircraft and retrieved critically ill sailors from ships hundreds of miles out in the Atlantic. With aid from the U.S. Coast Guard, the unit also made a daring rescue of 28 British seamen from their sinking merchant vessel 270 miles off the east coast of Florida.

In April 1997, the rescue mission at Patrick AFB expanded as the former 920th Weather Reconnaissance Group was reactivated as the 920th Rescue Group (920 RQG), forming a headquarters for the 301 RQS and the newly-formed 39th Rescue Squadron (39 RQS) as the helicopter and fixed-wing elements of the 301 RQS were formed into separate units.

In 2001, portions of the 920 RQG were forward deployed to Southwest Asia supporting Operation Southern Watch when the attacks on the U.S. homeland of 11 September 2001 quickly had the group segueing to Operation Enduring Freedom during 2001 and 2002.

On 1 April 2003, the 920 RQG was redesignated as the 920th Rescue Wing (920 RQW) and became the parent unit for all combat search and rescue (CSAR) organizations in Air Force Reserve Command as it added the 943d Rescue Group (943 RQG) at Davis-Monthan AFB, Arizona. The same year, elements of the 39 RQW and 301 RQS mobilized to active duty under Presidential Selected Reserve Callup (PSRC) authority and forward deployed to Talil Air Base, Iraq in support of Operation Iraqi Freedom. Several unit aircraft came under enemy antiaircraft fire, both antiaircraft artillery and surface-to-air missiles during this deployment.

In 2004, the 920 RQW's Regular Air Force gaining command was briefly reassigned from Air Combat Command (ACC) to Air Force Special Operations Command (AFSOC). This was done as part of a USAF and DoD Joint Personnel Recovery Agency (JPRA) initiative to merge all USAF combat search and rescue assets and USAF special operations fixed-wing and rotary-wing airborne infiltration/exfiltration (INFIL/XFIL), helicopter air refueling (HAR), and combat search and rescue (CSAR) assets into a single command. However, command and control issues unique to the special operations community made it apparent that this was not a preferred arrangement and, in 2006, all Regular Air Force and ARC combat search and rescue assets in AFSOC were aligned back under ACC as the gaining command in the Continental United States, under Pacific Air Forces (PACAF) for Regular Air Force CSAR units at Kadena Air Base, Okinawa and ARC units in the Alaska Air National Guard, and under U.S. Air Forces in Europe (USAFE) for Regular Air Force CSAR units then based in the United Kingdom.

In 2005, the wing's HC-130 and HH-60 flight crews recorded more than 1,000 lives saved during disaster operations along the Louisiana, Mississippi, and Alabama Gulf Coast in the wake of Hurricane Katrina. the wing provided extensive rescue and humanitarian support along the U.S. Gulf Coast following Hurricane Katrina, this less than 48 hours following the return of a significant portion of the wing's assets from an AEF deployment to Djibouti.

In 2008, three of the 920 RQW's subordinate rescue squadrons, the 39 RQS, 301 RQS and 308 RQS, led military units engaged in civilian rescue and relief efforts for hurricane-related disasters in southeast Texas, Louisiana, and parts of Mississippi to include Keesler AFB, Mississippi. Both Hurricanes Hannah and Ike wreaked havoc upon these states, with the 301 RQS providing support with HH-60G Pave Hawk helicopters, the 39 RQS with HC-130P Hercules aircraft and the 308 RQS providing pararescue support.

The 920 RQW's flight crews fly in weather conditions which often test man and machine or at night using night-vision goggle (NVG) technology. The 920 RQW has repeatedly completed arduous, over-water rescues which frequently require the wing's HH-60G Pave Hawk helicopters to be mid-air refueled, previously by their HC-130P Hercules COMBAT KING aircraft, and now by their HC-130J Hercules COMBAT KING II aircraft – a capability not shared by the U.S. Coast Guard's service-unique MH-60T Jayhawk helicopters and HC-130H and HC-130J Hercules aircraft.

The 920 RQW is also fully integrated into the Air Force's Air and Space Expeditionary Force and has deployed personnel and equipment to the former Naval Air Station Keflavik, Iceland on a routine basis in support of NATO operations, and to various locations in Southwest Asia (to include combat zones in Iraq and Djibouti) from 1991 to 2021 in support of Operation Desert Storm, Operation Southern Watch, Operation Enduring Freedom, Operation Iraqi Freedom, and Operation Freedom's Sentinel. The wing also continues to routinely deploy to Djibouti in support of Combined Joint Task Force - Horn of Africa and elsewhere in Southwest Asia in support of Operation Inherent Resolve.

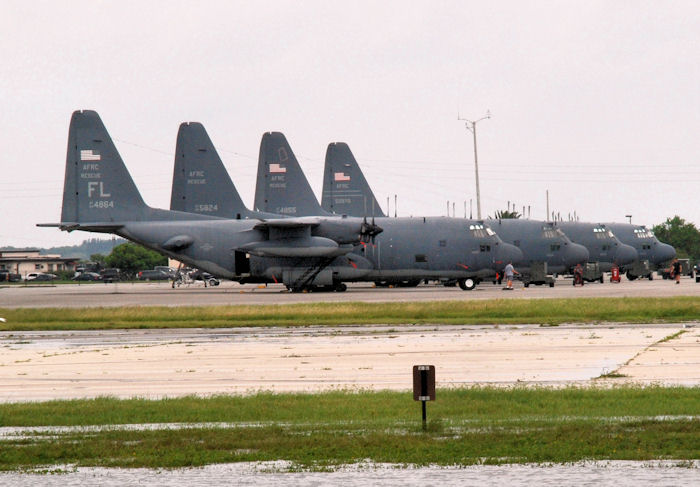
HC-130P/Ns of the 39th Rescue Squadron, 920th Rescue Wing, on the ramp at their home station of then-Patrick Air Force Base, Florida, circa 2008

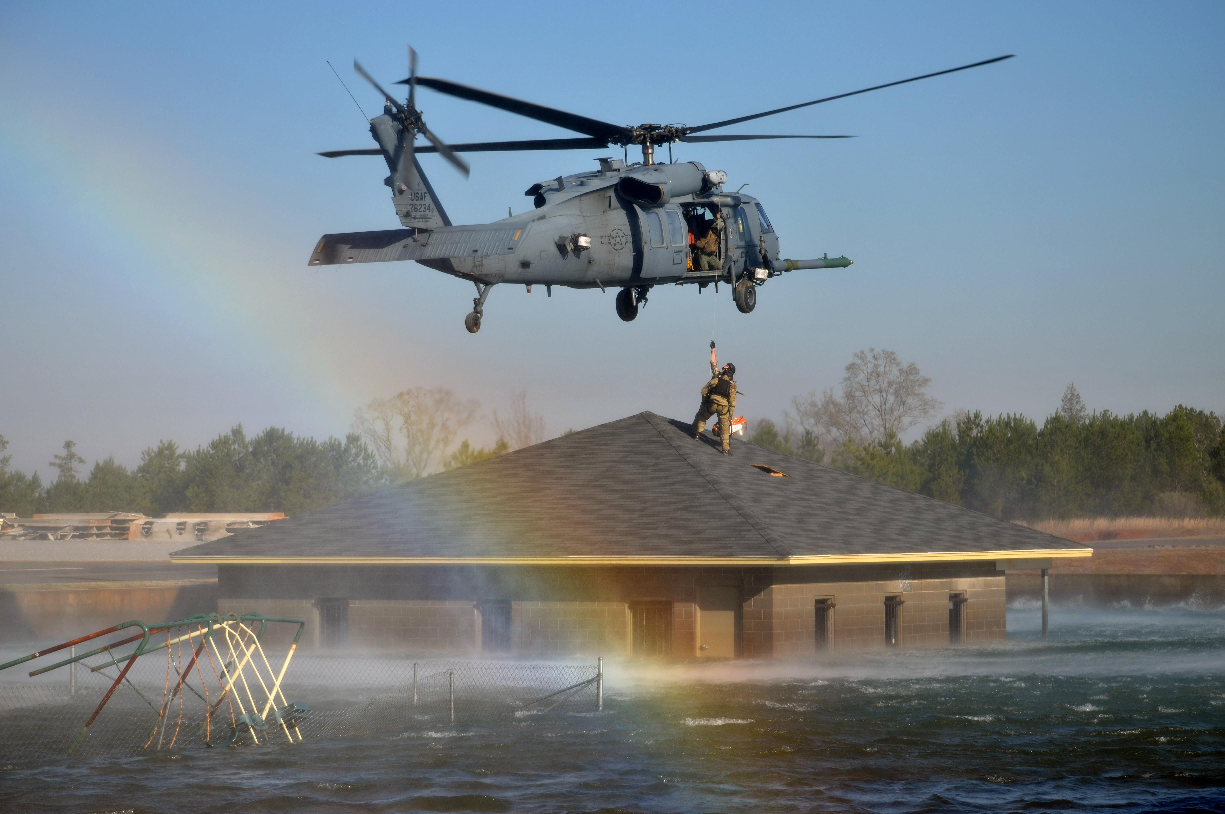
920th Rescue Wing/301st Rescue Squadron HH-60G Pave Hawk during Hurricane Katrina-like flood training at the Guardian Centers in Perry, Georgia

On 7 August 2017 the 920 RQW retired its last "legacy" HC-130P/N COMBAT KING when it was flown to the 309th Aerospace Maintenance and Regeneration Group (309 AMARG) at Davis-Monthan AFB. The "legacy" HC-130P/N aircraft having been based on modified C-130E airframes, the 920 RQW temporarily transitioned to newer HC-130P aircraft based on modified C-130H2 airframes transferred from the 176th Wing (176 WG) of the Alaska Air National Guard pending the 920 RQW's transition to and receipt of new manufacture HC-130J COMBAT KING II aircraft.

In January 2018, members of the 920 RQW were honored in the International Maritime Museum Hamburg in Hamburg, Germany after saving two German citizens whose vessel caught fire in July 2017 approximately 500 nautical miles off of Cape Canaveral, Florida. The medal is the organization's highest recognition awarded to individuals, crews or organizations who either took part in the rescue of Germans, or to German crews who took part in a rescue under extremely difficult or challenging circumstances. The German Maritime Search and Rescue Service presented the 920th Rescue Wing with the Medal of Honor for Rescue in Distress in a special ceremony.

In December 2019, the 920 RQW retired its last HC-130P that had been transferred from the Alaska ANG as an interim aircraft. Flight crews of the 39 RQS and HC-130 flight crew on the 920 RQW staff began rotating through the 58th Special Operations Wing's 415th Special Operations Squadron at Kirtland Air Force Base, New Mexico on extended temporary duty for transition training on the HC-130J while 920th Maintenance Group personnel rotated through the 82nd Training Wing at Sheppard Air Force Base, Texas for HC-130J maintenance training. On 2 April 2020, the 920 RQW accepted delivery of its first HC-130J Hercules COMBAT KING II aircraft from the Lockheed Martin factory at Air Force Plant 6 in Marietta, Georgia.

The 920 RQW received its first HH-60W Jolly Green II on 1 February 2024, and the wing divested its final two HH-60G on 8 September 2025.

== Lineage ==
- Established as the 920th Troop Carrier Group, Assault and activated on 15 January 1963 (not organized)

Organized in the reserve on 11 February 1963
Discontinued and inactivated on 15 December 1965

- Redesignated 920th Tactical Airlift Group on 2 March 1973

Activated in the reserve on 25 April 1973
Redesignated 920th Weather Reconnaissance Group on 1 January 1976
Inactivated on 1 November 1983

- Redesignated 920th Rescue Group on 1 April 1997

Activated in the Air Force Reserve on 15 April 1997
Redesignated 920th Rescue Wing on 1 April 2003

=== Assignments ===
- Continental Air Command, 15 January 1963 (not organized)
- 445th Troop Carrier Wing (later 445th Air Transport Wing, 445th Military Airlift Wing), 11 February 1963 – 15 December 1965
- 459th Tactical Airlift Wing, 25 April 1973
- Eastern Air Force Reserve Region, 1 January 1976
- Western Air Force Reserve Region, 15 February 1976
- Fourth Air Force, 1 October 1976
- 403d Rescue and Weather Reconnaissance Wing, 1 January 1977
- Fourth Air Force, 1 July 1981
- 403d Rescue and Weather Reconnaissance Wing, 1 March – 1 November 1983
- Tenth Air Force, 15 April 1997
- 939th Rescue Wing, 16 April 1997
- Tenth Air Force, 1 Apr 2003 – present

=== Components ===
Groups

- 920th Operations Group: 1 April 2003 – present
- 920th Maintenance Group: 1 April 2003 – present
- 920th Mission Support Group: 1 April 2003 – present}
- 943d Rescue Group: 12 February 2005 – present

Davis-Monthan Air Force Base, Arizona (Note: Components are stationed with wing headquarters, except as noted.)

Squadrons

- 39th Rescue Squadron: 15 April 1997 – 1 April 2003
  - Shifted to 920th Operations Group on 1 April 2003
- 301st Rescue Squadron: 15 April 1997 – 1 April 2003
  - Shifted to 920th Operations Group on 1 April 2003
- 308th Rescue Squadron: 15 April 1997 – 1 April 2003
  - Shifted to 920th Operations Group on 1 April 2003
- 920th Operations Support Squadron: 15 April 1997 – 1 April 2003
  - Shifted to 920th Operations Group on 1 April 2003
- 702d Troop Carrier Squadron: 11 February 1963 – 15 December 1965
- 815th Tactical Airlift Squadron (later 815th Weather Reconnaissance Squadron): 25 April 1973 – 1 November 1983
- 920th Aerospace Medicine Squadron: 5 Aug 2012 – present (previously designated 920th Aerospace Medicine Flight)

Joint Base Langley-Eustis, Virginia

Flights

- 34th Air Weather Flight: 1 January 1980 – 1 November 1983

=== Stations ===
- Memphis Municipal Airport, Tennessee, 11 February 1963 – 15 December 1965
- Keesler Air Force Base, Mississippi, 25 April 1973 – 1 November 1983
- Patrick Space Force Base, Florida, 15 April 1997 – present
  - Home station known as Patrick Air Force Base prior to December 2020

=== Aircraft ===
- Fairchild C-123 Provider (1963–1965)
- C-130E Hercules (1973–1977)
- WC-130H Hercules (1976–1983)
- HC-130P/N Hercules Combat King (1974–2019)
- HC-130J Combat King II (2 April 2020 – present)
- HH-60G Pave Hawk (1997–present)
