= 39th Rescue Squadron =

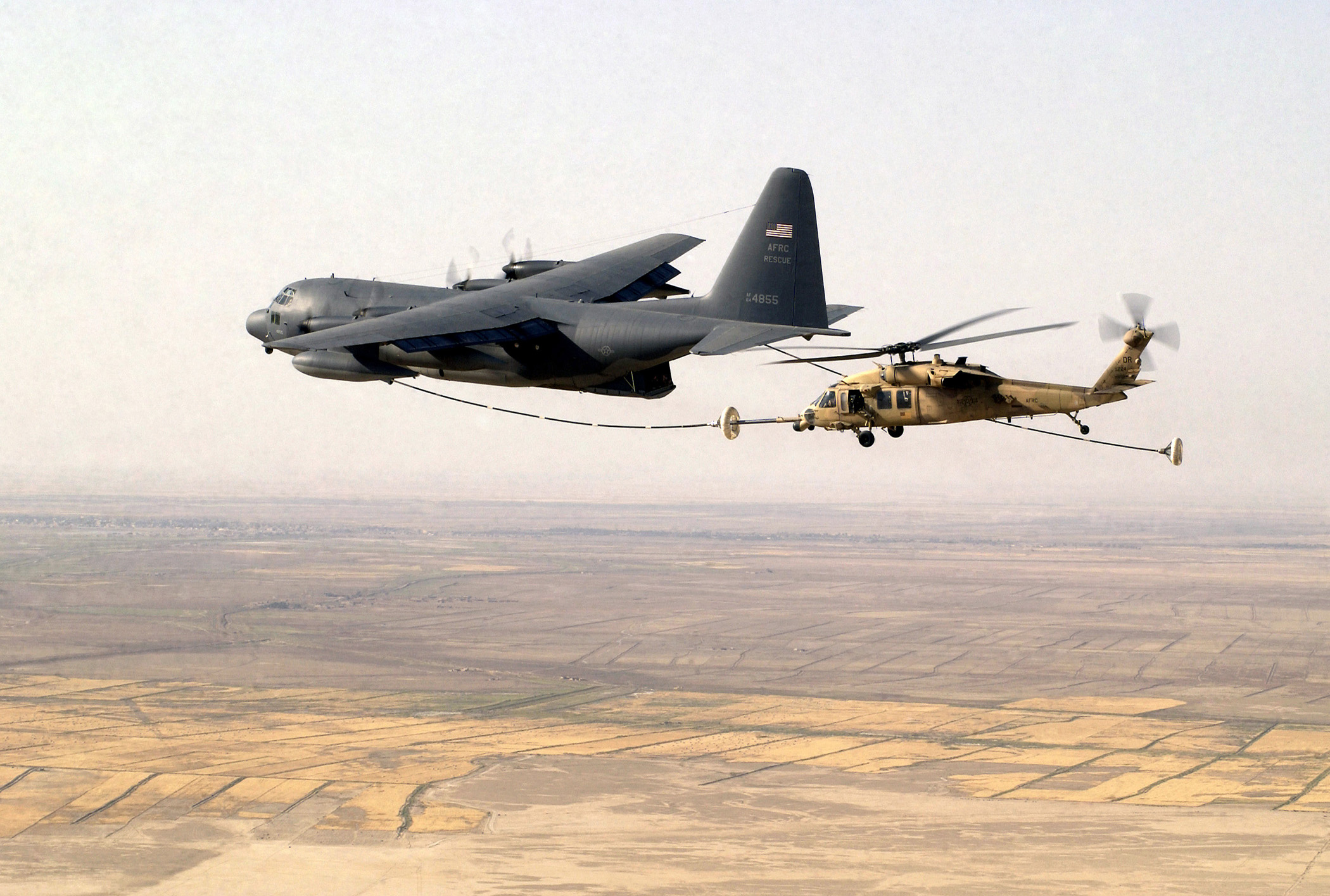
- 39th Squadron HC-130P/N refuels a 301st Rescue Squadron HH-60G near Tallil AB, Iraq
- Active: 1952–1957; 1967–1972; 1992–1994; 1997–present
- Country: United States
- Branch: United States Air Force
- Role: Search and rescue
- Part of: Air Force Reserve Command
- Garrison/HQ: Patrick Space Force Base
- Nickname: Crown/King
- Motto: That Others May Live
- Engagements: Korean War; Vietnam War; Operation Iraqi Freedom; Operation Enduring Freedom
- Decorations: Distinguished Unit Citation; Presidential Unit Citation; Air Force Outstanding Unit Award; Republic of Korea Presidential Unit Citation; Republic of Vietnam Gallantry Cross with Palm

Commanders
- Current commander: Lt Col David Underwood

Insignia
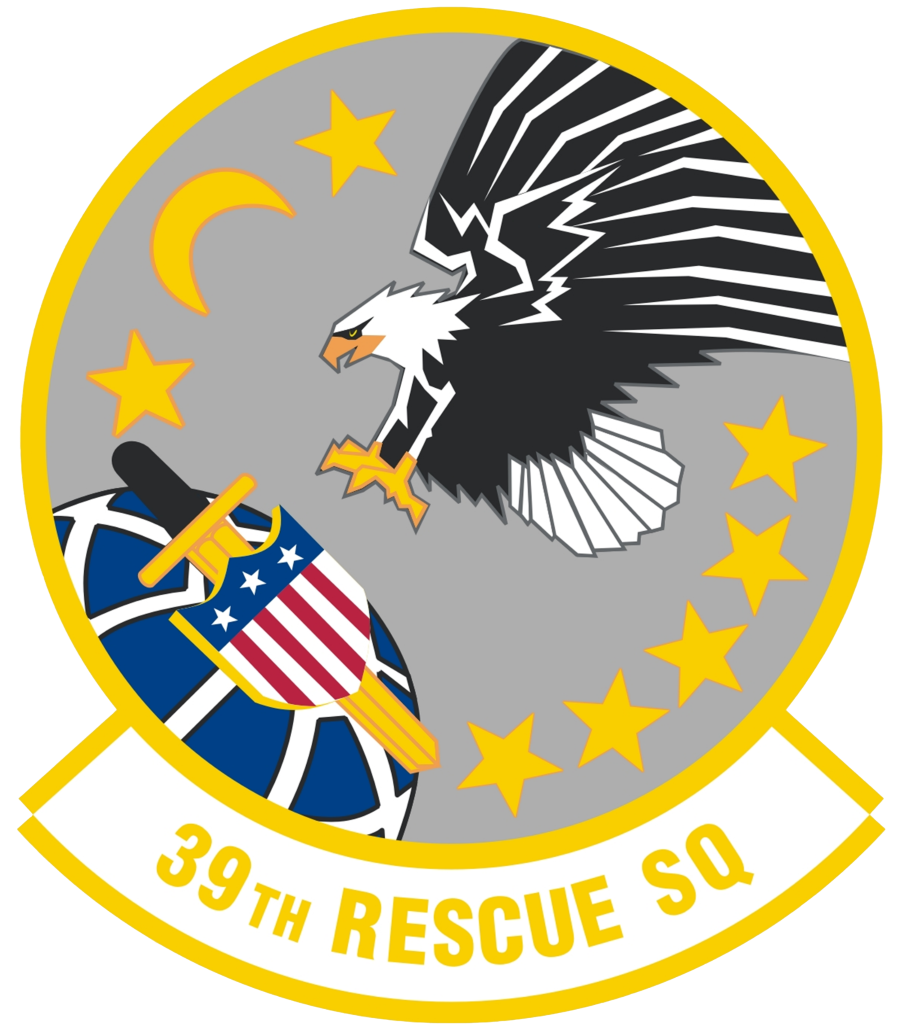
- 39th Rescue Squadron emblem (approved 12 March 1992)

The 39th Rescue Squadron is an Air Force Reserve Command unit of the 920th Rescue Wing (920 RQW) at Patrick Space Force Base, Florida. Until December 2019, it operated the Lockheed HC-130P/N Combat King aircraft conducting search and rescue and combat search and rescue/personnel recovery missions. The squadron is currently transitioning to the Lockheed Martin HC-130J Combat King II aircraft, which will provide significant increases in the squadron's capabilities. An Air Force Reserve Command unit, the 39th Rescue Squadron is operationally-gained by the Air Combat Command (ACC) upon mobilization.

== Mission ==
As an Air Force Reserve Command unit, the squadron mission is to rapidly deploy HC-130 aircraft and personnel to austere airfields and denied territory in order to execute all-weather personnel recovery operations. 39th flight crews routinely perform high and low altitude personnel and equipment airdrops, infiltration/exfiltration of personnel, helicopter air refueling, and forward area refueling point missions. When tasked, the squadron also conducts humanitarian assistance operations, disaster response, security cooperation/aviation advisory, emergency aeromedical evacuation, casualty evacuation, noncombatant evacuation operations. During the Space Shuttle program, the 39th also provided DoD crewed space flight support for NASA.

== History ==
=== Korean War and rescue in the north Pacific ===
The squadron was first activated in November 1952 as the 39th Air Rescue Squadron at Ashiya Air Base, Japan when the Air Rescue Service expanded the 3d Air Rescue Squadron into a group. The squadron assumed the mission, personnel and aircraft of Flight D, 3d Air Rescue Squadron, which was discontinued when the squadron activated. The 39th conducted search, rescue, and escort missions in Japan and Korea during and following the Korean War. It also flew missions included refueling rescue helicopters and performing airborne command, control, and communications functions during combat rescue operations.

=== Vietnam War ===
On 18 January 1967, the squadron was formed at Udorn Royal Thai Air Force Base with six Lockheed HC-130 Hercules transferred from the 37th Aerospace Rescue and Recovery Squadron.

On 8 June 1967 the squadron relocated from Udorn to Tuy Hoa Air Base, South Vietnam and began to receive HC-130Ps to replace their HC-130Hs. The HC-130P was the first aircraft able to refuel helicopters and so provided a dramatic increase in range for helicopters, particularly those involved in combat search and rescue missions. By mid-1969, the squadron was operating 11 HC-130Ps from Tuy Hoa. On 16 September 1970 the squadron relocated from Tuy Hoa AB to Cam Ranh Air Base.

In March 1972 the squadron moved from Cam Ranh to Korat Royal Thai Air Force Base. On 1 April 1972, the 39th was dissolved and the aircraft and crews temporarily became part of Detachment 4 of the 3d Aerospace Rescue and Recovery Group at Korat. On 8 July 1972, the detachment was replaced by the 56th Aerospace Rescue and Recovery Squadron and the .

On 10 October 1990, the squadron was reestablished as the 39th Air Rescue Squadron under the Air Rescue Service and activated at Misawa Air Base, Japan on 1 January 1992 as an HH-60G Pave Hawk helicopter squadron. On 1 February 1993, the squadron was redesignated as the 39th Rescue Squadron under the 432d Operations Group of the 432d Fighter Wing at Misawa.

The squadron was inactivated as a Regular Air Force unit in 1994 concurrent with inactivation of the 432d Fighter Wing.

=== Reactivation ===
The 39th Rescue Squadron was reactivated in 1997 as an Air Force Reserve Command unit and assigned to the 920th Rescue Group (later the 920th Rescue Wing), at Patrick Space Force Base, Florida, assuming operation of all Lockheed HC-130P/N aircraft and command of all HC-130 flight crews and associated support personnel previously assigned to the 301st Rescue Squadron. Since that time, the squadron has provided rescue support to NASA on the Eastern Range during the Space Shuttle program, participated in domestic humanitarian operations following the landfall of Hurricane Katrina along the U.S. Gulf Coast, and following the attacks on the United States of 11 September 2001, has made repeated combat deployments of its aircraft and aircrews to Iraq and Djibouti in support of Operations Iraqi Freedom and Enduring Freedom.

On 16 December 2019, the squadron retired their last HC-130 P/N Combat King aircraft. This fleet of aircraft will be replaced with new HC/MC-130J models in the spring of 2020. The squadron's first HC-130J Combat King II arrived on 2 April 2020.

== Lineage ==
- Constituted as the 39th Air Rescue Squadron on 17 October 1952

Activated on 14 November 1952
Inactivated on 24 November 1957

- Redesignated 39th Aerospace Rescue and Recovery Squadron and activated on 16 January 1967 (not organized)

Organized on 18 January 1967
Inactivated on 30 April 1972

- Redesignated 39th Air Rescue Squadron on 10 October 1990
- Activated on 1 January 1992

Redesignated 39th Rescue Squadron on 1 February 1993
Inactivated on 1 August 1994

- Activated in the Air Force Reserve Command on 15 April 1997

=== Assignments ===
- 3d Air Rescue Group, 14 November 1952
- 2d Air Rescue Group, 18 June–24 November 1957
- Military Airlift Command, 16 January 1967 (not organized)
- 3d Aerospace Rescue and Recovery Group, 18 January 1967 – 30 April 1972
- Air Rescue Service, 1 January 1992
- 432d Operations Group, 1 February 1993 – 1 August 1994
- 920th Rescue Group, 15 April 1997
- 920th Operations Group, 1 April 2003 – present (Note: Dollman erroneously identifies the 920th Operations Group as a redesignation of the 920th Rescue Group. However, on 1 April 2003, the 920th Group was redesignated as a wing, Stephens, Maj Tonia (20 November 2017). "Factsheet 920th Rescue Wing (AFRC)". Air Force Historical Research Agency. and the 920th Operations Group was formed as a newly constituted unit.)

=== Stations ===
- Ashiya Air Base, Japan, 14 November 1952 – 24 November 1957
- Udorn Royal Thai Air Force Base, Thailand, 18 January 1967
- Tuy Hoa Air Base, South Vietnam, 8 June 1967
- Cam Ranh Air Base, South Vietnam, 16 September 1970 – 30 April 1972
- Misawa Air Base, Japan, 1 January 1992 – 1 August 1994
- Patrick Space Force Base, Florida, 15 April 1997 – present

=== Aircraft ===
- Grumman SA-16 Albatross (1952–1957)
- Douglas SC-47 Skytrain (1952–1957)
- Sikorsky SH-19 (1952–1957)
- Sikorsky HH-60G Pave Hawk (1992–1994)
- Lockheed HC-130H, HC-130P, HC-130P/N Hercules COMBAT KING (1967–1972, 1997–2019)
- HC-130J Hercules Combat King II (2 April 2020-present)

== See also ==
- List of United States Air Force rescue squadrons
