= Lockheed HC-130 =

Search and rescue aircraft version of the C-130 Hercules

HC-130
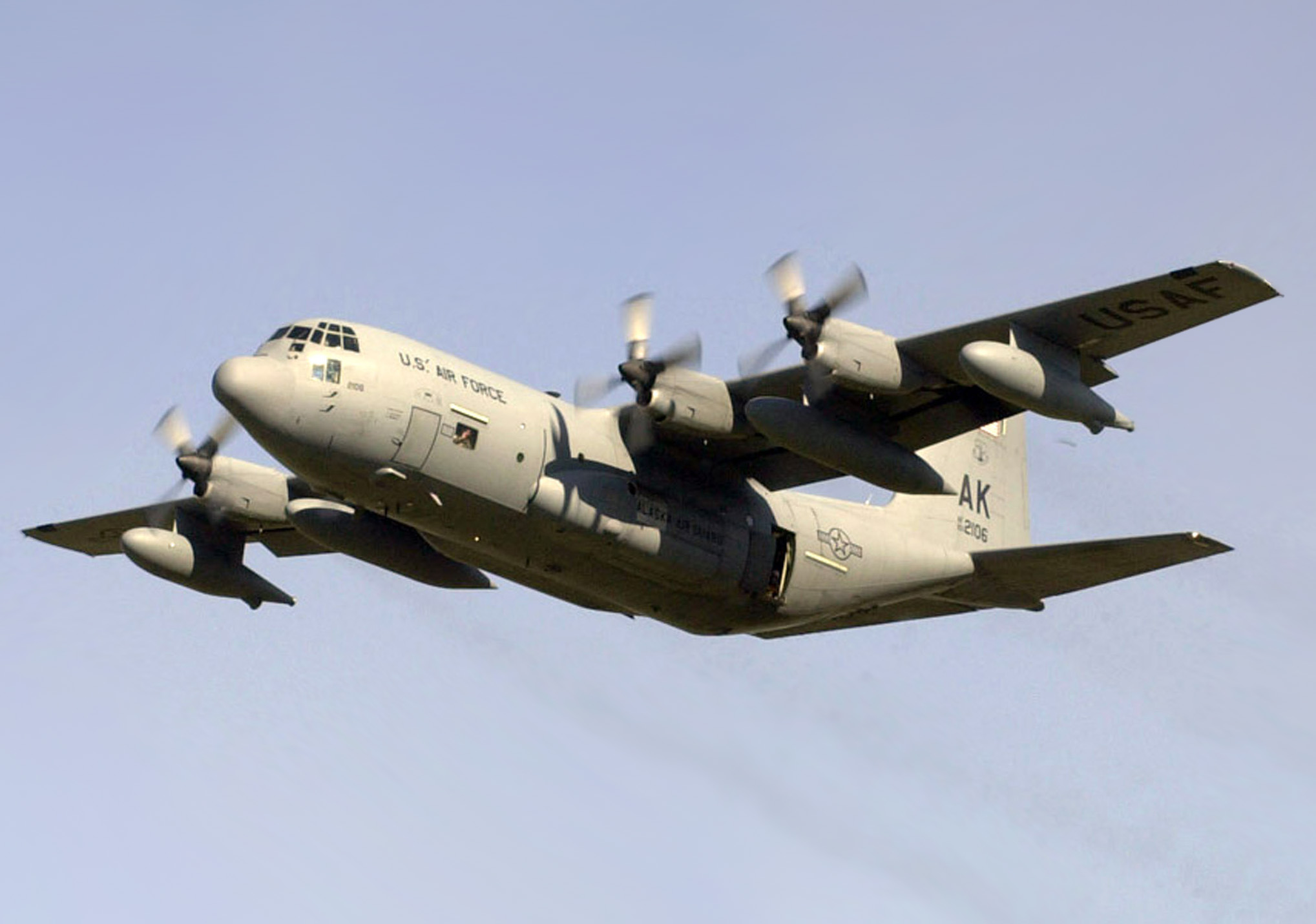
- A USAF HC-130P from the 211th Rescue Squadron

General information
- Type: CSAR/rescue aircraft
- National origin: United States
- Manufacturer: Lockheed; Lockheed Martin
- Status: In service
- Primary users: United States Air Force United States Coast Guard
- Number built: HC-130P/N: Active force, 13; ANG, 13; Reserve, 10; HC-130H: 22; two with the Avionics One Upgrade (A1U); HC-130J: 6

History
- Manufactured: 1959–present
- Introduction date: 1959
- First flight: 1959; 2002 (USCG HC-130J); 29 July 2010 (USAF HC-130J)
- Developed from: Lockheed C-130 Hercules

USCG HC-130H flying in Hawaii, 2015.

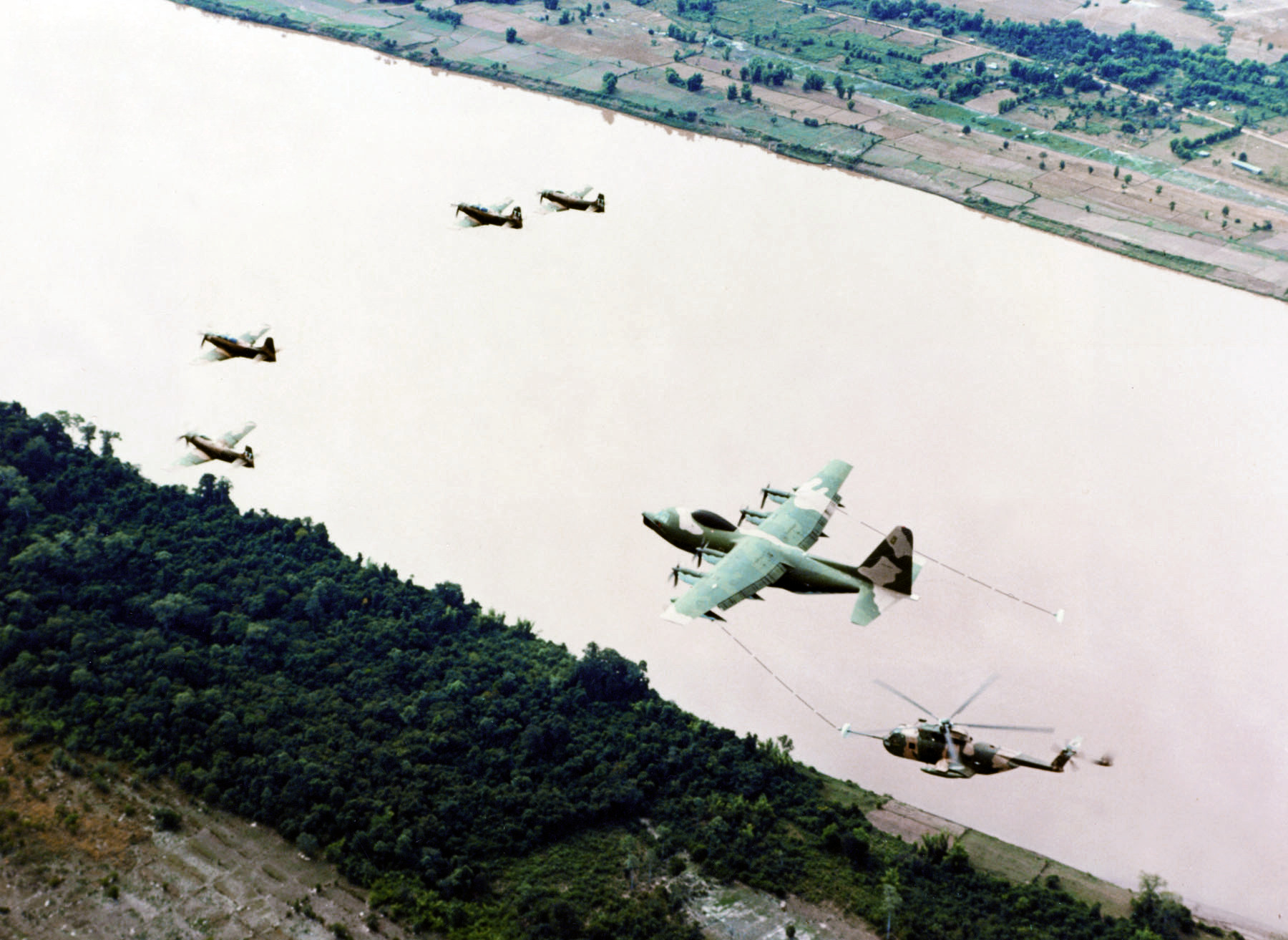
A USAF HC-130P refuels an HH-3E Jolly Green Giant, 1968.

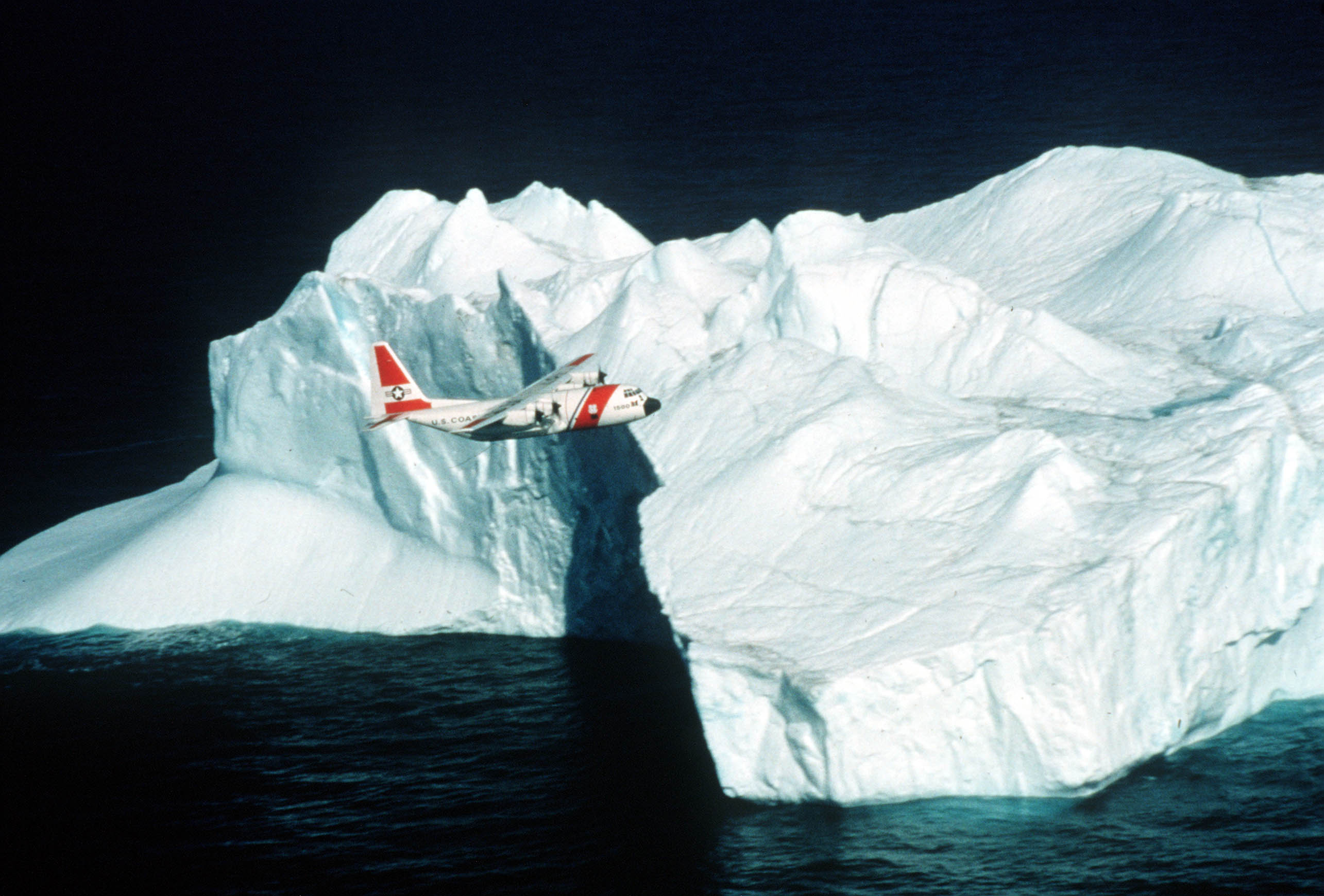
USCG HC-130H on International Ice Patrol duties

The Lockheed HC-130 is an extended-range, search and rescue (SAR)/combat search and rescue (CSAR) version of the C-130 Hercules military transport aircraft, with two different versions operated by two separate services in the U.S. armed forces.

The HC-130J Super Hercules version is operated by the United States Coast Guard in a SAR and maritime reconnaissance role.

The HC-130P Combat King and HC-130J Combat King II variants are operated by the United States Air Force for long-range SAR and CSAR. The USAF variants also execute on scene CSAR command and control, airdrop pararescue forces and equipment, and are also capable of providing aerial refueling to appropriately equipped USAF, US Army, USN, USMC, and NATO/Allied helicopters in flight. In this latter role, they are primarily used to extend the range and endurance of combat search and rescue helicopters.

In July 2015, it was announced that the U.S. Forest Service will be receiving some of the U.S. Coast Guard's HC-130H aircraft to use as aerial fire retardant drop tankers as the Coast Guard replaces the HC-130H with additional HC-130J and HC-27J Spartan aircraft, the latter being received from the Air National Guard as part of a USAF-directed divestment of the C-27.

== Development ==
The United States Coast Guard was the first recipient of the HC-130 variant. In keeping with the USN/USMC/USCG designation system of the time, the designation for the first order in 1958 was R8V-1G, but with the introduction of the Tri-Service aircraft designation system for commonality across the U.S. Armed Forces in 1962, this was eventually changed to HC-130B. Six USCG HC-130E aircraft were produced in 1964, but production soon switched to the new C-130H platform which was entering service. The first HC-130H flew on 8 December 1964 and the USCG still operates this aircraft.

First flown in 1964, the USAF HC-130P Combat King aircraft has served many roles and missions. Based on the USAF C-130E airframe, it was modified to conduct search and rescue missions, provide a command and control platform, conduct in-flight refueling of helicopters, and carry supplemental fuel in additional internal cargo bay fuel tanks for extending range or air refueling. They were also originally modified to employ the Fulton surface-to-air recovery system, although this system has since been discontinued and the specialized equipment removed. The HC-130N was a follow-up order without the Fulton recovery system and all USAF extant HC-130Ps have since had their Fulton recovery systems removed.

== Role ==
=== USAF HC-130P/N Combat King ===
The USAF HC-130P/N, also known as the Combat King aircraft, can fly in the day against a reduced threat; however, crews normally fly night, low-level, air refueling and airdrop operations using night vision goggles. The aircraft can routinely fly low-level NVG tactical flight profiles to avoid detection. To enhance the probability of mission success and survivability near populated areas, USAF HC-130 crews employ tactics that include incorporating no external lighting or communications and avoiding radar and weapons detection.

Secondary mission capabilities include performing tactical airdrops of pararescue specialist teams, small bundles, zodiac watercraft, or four-wheel drive all-terrain vehicles; and providing direct assistance to a survivor in advance of the arrival of a recovery vehicle. Other capabilities are extended visual and electronic searches over land or water, tactical airborne radar approaches and unimproved airfield operations. A team of three Pararescuemen, trained in emergency trauma medicine, harsh environment survival and assisted evasion techniques, is part of the basic mission crew complement.

Up until 2016, HC-130P/N aircraft of the Combat Air Forces were a combination of mid to late-1960s vintage aircraft based on C-130E airframes and mid-1990s vintage aircraft based on C-130H3 airframes. All underwent extensive modifications. These modifications included night vision-compatible interior and exterior lighting, a personnel locator system compatible with aircrew survival radios, improved digital low-power color radar and forward-looking infrared systems. As of 2018, with the exception of a handful of extant aircraft in the Air National Guard, all remaining HC-130P/N aircraft are operated by the Air Force Reserve Command.

=== USCG HC-130H ===
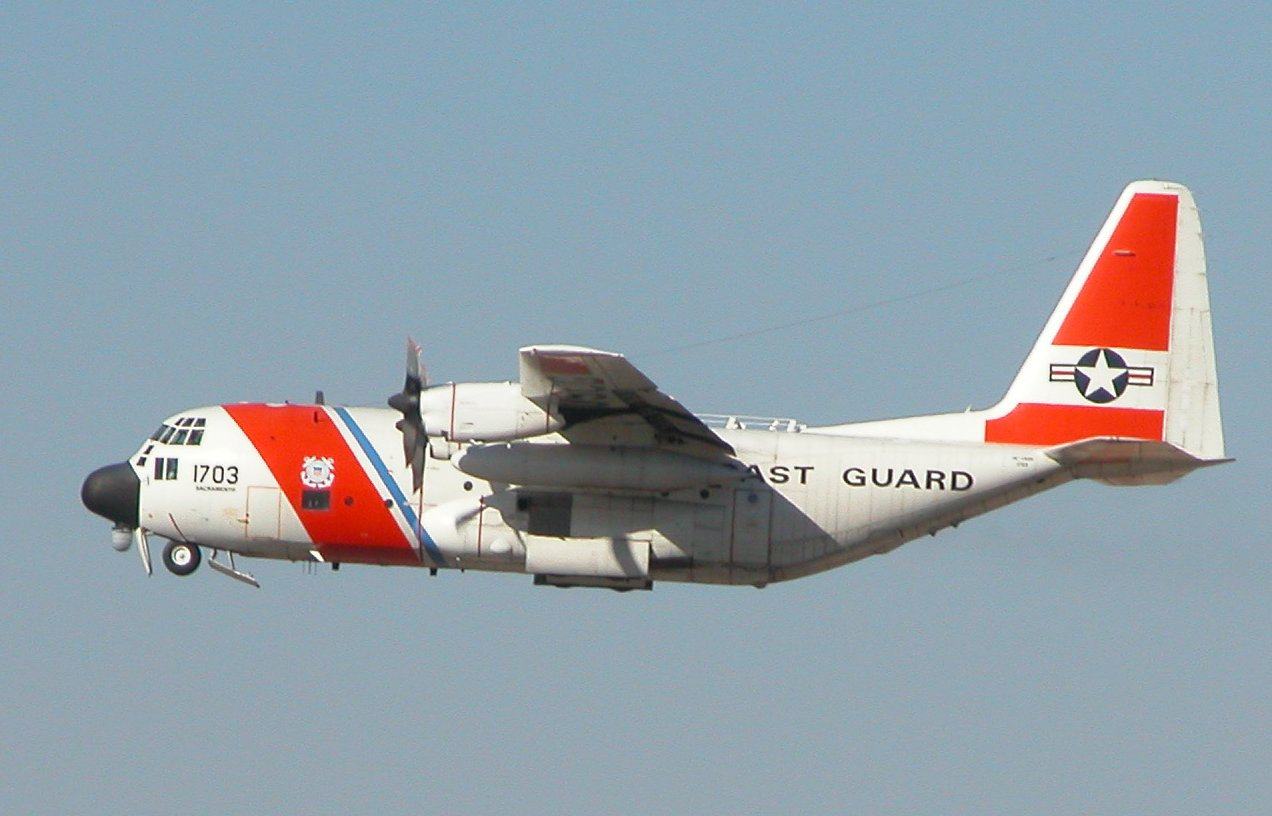
USCG HC-130H

The HC-130H first flew on 8 December 1964. The Coast Guard began equipping with the HC-130H in the late sixties and early seventies. U.S. Coast Guard HC-130Hs were primarily acquired for long-range overwater search missions, support airlift, maritime patrol, North Atlantic Ice Patrol and command and control of search and rescue, replacing previously operated HU-16 Albatross amphibious and HC-123 Provider land-based aircraft. Like their USAF counterparts, USCG HC-130s also have the capability of air dropping rescue equipment to survivors at sea or over open terrain. They carried additional equipment and two 1,800-gallon fuel bladders in the cargo compartment.

=== USAF HC-130P Combat Shadow ===
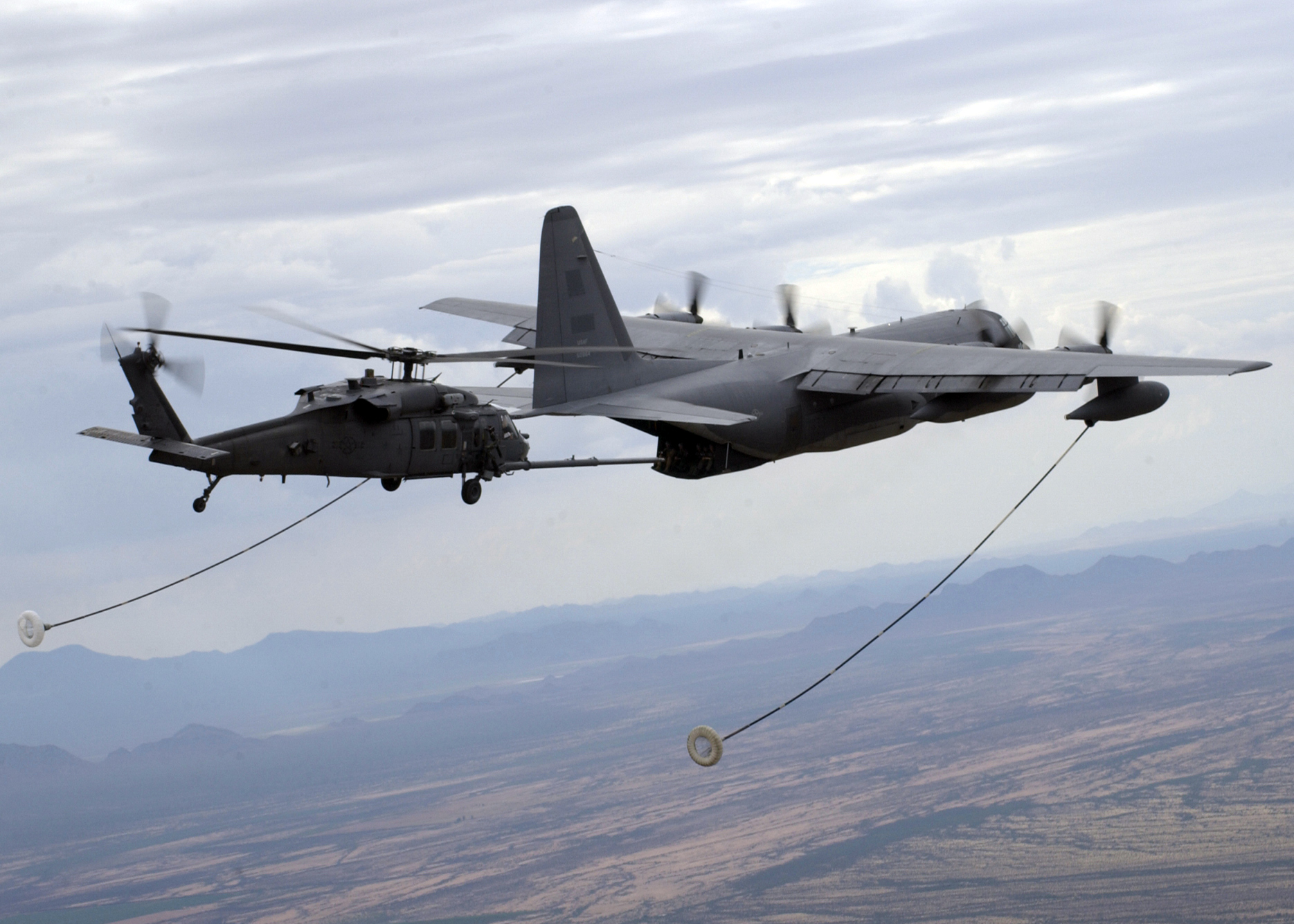
USAF HC-130P-N refueling an HH-60G Pave Hawk

The MC-130P Combat Shadow series of aircraft initially entered service in December 1965 during the Vietnam War as the HC-130H CROWN airborne controller. The CROWN airborne controllers located downed aircrew and directed Combat Search and Rescue operations over North Vietnam. In mid-1966 flight testing began of rescue helicopters equipped with aerial refueling receivers, and 11 of the controller aircraft were modified as tankers and redesignated the HC-130P SAR Command and Control/vertical lift (helicopter) aerial refueling aircraft, entering service in Southeast Asia in November 1966. Originally assigned to the Tactical Air Command (TAC) and then the Military Airlift Command (MAC), Combat Shadows have been part of the Air Force Special Operations Command (AFSOC) since that command's establishment in 1993. In February 1996, AFSOC's 28-aircraft HC-130P tanker fleet was redesignated the MC-130P Combat Shadow, aligning the variant with AFSOC's other M-series special operations mission aircraft. At the same time as this redesignation, USAF continued to field HC-130P/N aircraft as dedicated CSAR platforms under the Air Combat Command (ACC) and in ACC or PACAF-gained CSAR units in the Air Force Reserve and Air National Guard.

=== USCG HC-130J ===
The new HC-130J aircraft are derived from the Lockheed Martin KC-130J tanker operated by the U.S. Marine Corps. The USCG has six HC-130Js in service, but they are not capable of refueling helicopters in flight. The first delivery of this variant to the United States Coast Guard was in October 2003. They initially operated in a logistic support role until they received significant modifications, including installations of a large window on each side of the fuselage to allow crew members to visually scan the sea surface, the addition of an inverse synthetic aperture sea search radar, flare tubes, a forward-looking infrared/electro-optical sensor, a gaseous oxygen system for the crew and an enhanced communications suite. Aircraft are installed with the Minotaur Mission System and incorporates sensors; radar; and command, control, communications, computers, intelligence, surveillance and reconnaissance equipment and enables aircrews to gather and process surveillance information that can be transmitted to other platforms and units during flight.

The first of these modified Coast Guard HC-130Js was delivered in March 2008 and complete delivered in September 2019. The 17th HC-130J for the United States Coast Guard is expected to be delivered in 2024.

The Coast Guard is acquiring a fleet of 22 new, fully missionized HC-130J aircraft to replace its legacy HC-130Hs.

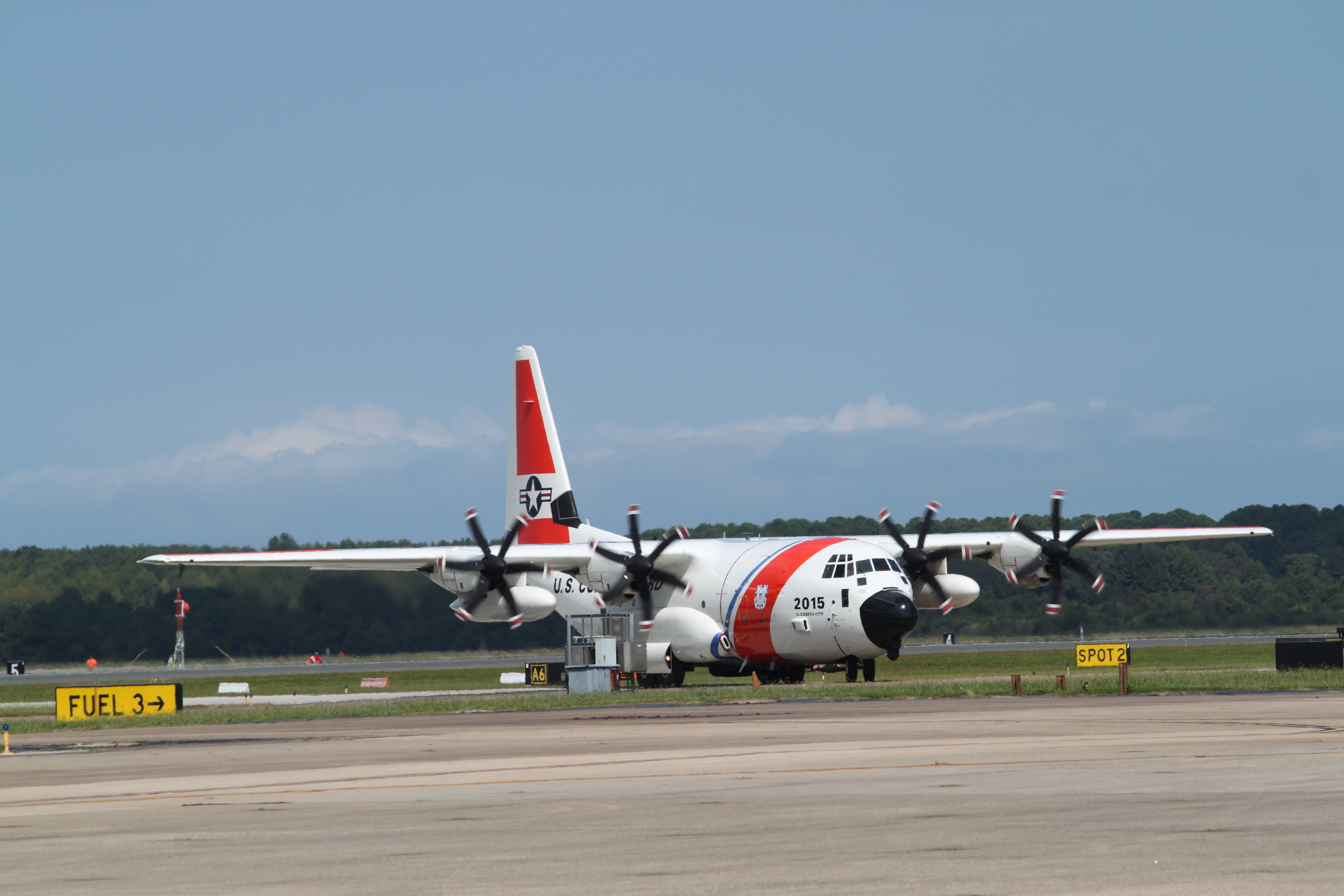
USCG HC-130J Taxiing on the runway at NAS Oceana

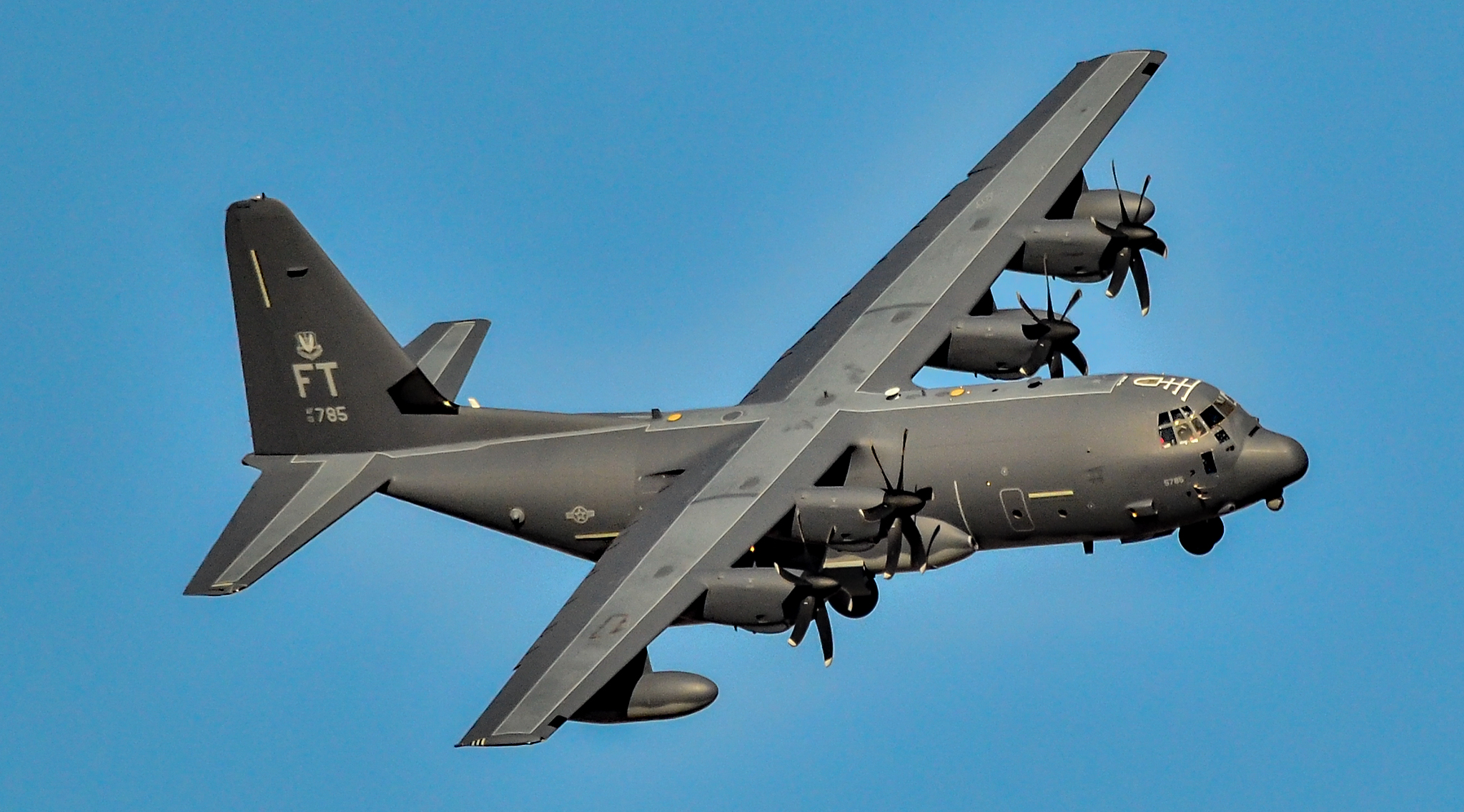
USAF HC-130J Combat King II

=== USAF HC-130J Combat King II ===
The USAF HC-130J Combat King II combat rescue variant has modifications for in-flight refueling of helicopters and tilt-rotor aircraft, including refueling pods on underwing pylons and additional internal fuel tanks in the cargo bay. The HC-130J Combat King II is also capable of itself being refueled in flight by boom-equipped tankers such as the KC-135, KC-10 and KC-46.

Lockheed Martin officials conducted the first flight of the USAF HC-130J version on 29 July 2010. The first HC-130J was delivered to the USAF in September 2010, but underwent further testing before achieving Initial Operational Capability (IOC) in 2012.

The HC-130J personnel recovery aircraft completed developmental testing on 14 March 2011. The final test point was air-to-air refueling, and was the first ever boom refueling of a C-130 where the aircraft's refueling receiver was installed during aircraft production. This test procedure also applied to the MC-130J Combat Shadow II aircraft in production for Air Force Special Operations Command.

Given the advancing age of its current HC-130P/N airframes, all of which are based on either the venerable (and since retired) mid/late-1960s vintage C-130E airframe or the more recent mid-1990s vintage C-130H2/H3 airframe, the Air Force plans to eventually buy up to 39 HC-130J Combat King IIs to equip rescue squadrons in the active Air Force, the Air Force Reserve Command and the Air National Guard. The first HC-130J was delivered to the 563d Rescue Group at Davis-Monthan Air Force Base, Arizona on 15 November 2012.

The US Air Force Reserve received its first HC-130J on 2 April 2020 when it was delivered to the 920th Rescue Wing's 39th Rescue Squadron at Patrick Air Force Base in Florida.

== Operational history ==
=== U.S. Coast Guard operations ===
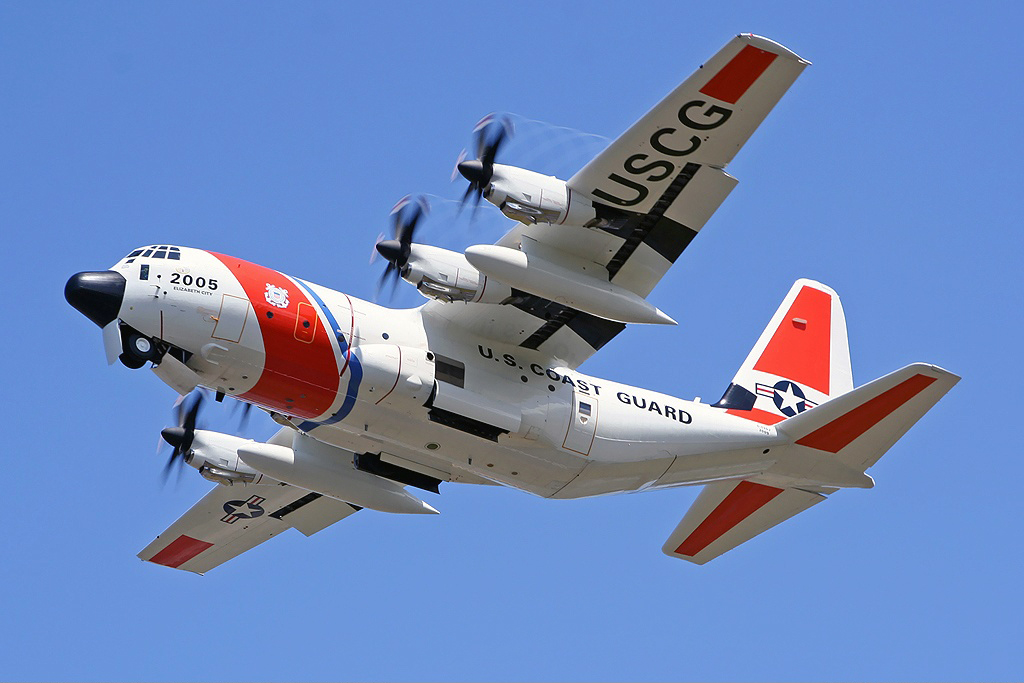
USCG HC-130J

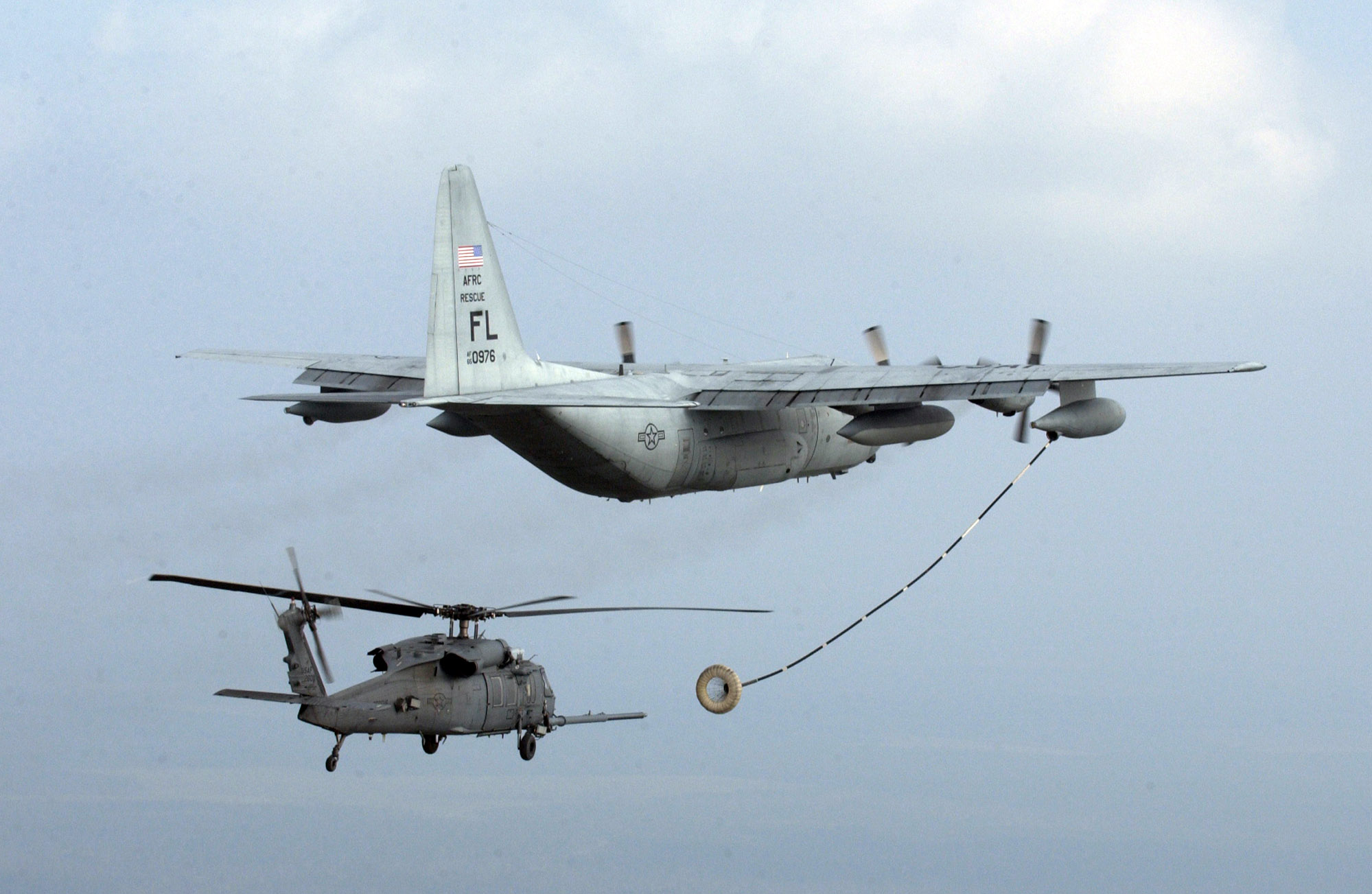
One of the 920th Rescue Wing's HC-130P Hercules "Combat King" aircraft refuels one of the wing's HH-60G Pave Hawk helicopters.

The United States Coast Guard operates 18 HC-130H aircraft from three bases around the United States:

- CGAS Clearwater, Florida
- CGAS Kodiak, Alaska
- CGAS Barbers Point (formerly NAS Barbers Point), Hawaii

These aircraft are used for search and rescue, enforcement of laws and treaties, illegal drug interdiction, marine environmental protection, military readiness, International Ice Patrol missions, as well as cargo and personnel transport.

The Coast Guard also currently operates an additional 9 HC-130J aircraft from CGAS Elizabeth City, North Carolina.

Neither the HC-130H nor the HC-130J in their U.S. Coast Guard variants are equipped for the aerial refueling of helicopters.

=== U.S. Air Force operations ===
The HC-130P (to include HC-130P/N) is primarily based on the C-130E airlift aircraft, with a smaller number based on the C-130H. The USAF HC-130J is a newly manufactured aircraft. As the dedicated fixed-wing combat search and rescue platform in the USAF inventory, the HC-130 is operated by the following units:

- Air Combat Command
  - 347th Rescue Group (347 RQG), 71st Rescue Squadron (71 RQS), Moody AFB, Georgia – HC-130J
  - 563d Rescue Group (563 RQG), 79th Rescue Squadron (79 RQS), Davis-Monthan AFB, Arizona – HC-130J
- Air Education and Training Command
  - 58th Special Operations Wing (58 SOW), 415th Special Operations Squadron (415 SOS), Kirtland AFB, New Mexico – HC-130J
- Air Force Reserve Command
  - 920th Rescue Wing (920 RQW), 39th Rescue Squadron (39 RQS), Patrick Space Force Base, Florida – HC-130J
- Air National Guard
  - 106th Rescue Wing (106 RQW), 102d Rescue Squadron (102 RQS), New York Air National Guard, Francis S. Gabreski Air National Guard Base, New York – HC-130J
  - 129th Rescue Wing (129 RQW), 130th Rescue Squadron (130 RQS), California Air National Guard, Moffett Federal Airfield, California – HC-130J
  - 176th Wing (176 WG), 211th Rescue Squadron (211 RQS), Alaska Air National Guard, Joint Base Elmendorf-Richardson, Alaska – HC-130J

HC-130s were assigned to the Air Combat Command (ACC) from 1992 to 2003, to include those Air Force Reserve Command and Air National Guard rescue units operationally-gained by ACC. Prior to 1992, they were assigned to the Air Rescue Service as part of Military Airlift Command (MAC). In October 2003, operational responsibility for the Continental United States (CONUS) and Alaskan air search and rescue (SAR) mission, as well as the worldwide combat search and rescue (CSAR) mission was transferred to the Air Force Special Operations Command (AFSOC) at Hurlburt Field, Florida.

In October 2006, all USAF CSAR forces were reassigned back to Air Combat Command with the exception of those Alaska Air National Guard CSAR assets which were transferred to the operational claimancy of Pacific Air Forces (PACAF). The CONUS and Alaska SAR missions were also transferred back to ACC and PACAF, respectively. However, the Air Force Rescue Coordination Center (AFRCC) that had been previously located at McClellan Air Force Base, California and Scott Air Force Base, Illinois under MAC and at Langley Air Force Base, Virginia under ACC, was relocated to Tyndall Air Force Base, Florida under the control of 1st Air Force (1 AF), the USAF component command to U.S. Northern Command (USNORTHCOM) and ACC's numbered air force for the Air National Guard.

While under AFSOC and since returning to ACC and PACAF, USAF, AFRC and ANG HC-130s have been deployed to Italy, Kyrgyzstan, Kuwait, Pakistan, Saudi Arabia, Turkey, Jordan, Uzbekistan, Djibouti, Iraq, Afghanistan, and Greece in support of Operations Southern and Northern Watch, Operation Allied Force, Operation Enduring Freedom, Operation Iraqi Freedom, and Operation Unified Protector. HC-130s also support continuous alert commitments in Alaska, and provided rescue coverage for NASA Space Shuttle operations in Florida until that program's termination in 2011.

The USAF's first HC-130Js gained initial operating capability (IOC) in April 2013, permitting retirement of the first group of HC-130P aircraft based on C-130E airframes that were built in the mid and late 1960s. The first HC-130J was delivered by Lockheed Martin to Air Combat Command on 23 September 2010 for testing.

In 2009, there were HC-130P aircraft operated by the Air National Guard, and 10 by the Air Force Reserve Command. As of 2019, unofficial estimates place the number of HC-130Ps remaining at 6 airframes, all assigned to Air Force Reserve Command.

As of 2023, all USAF units have transitioned to the HC-130J Combat King II.

=== World's longest turboprop aircraft distance record ===
On 20 February 1972, Lieutenant Colonel Edgar Allison, USAF, and his flight crew set a recognized turboprop aircraft class record of 8,732.09 miles (14,052.94 km) for a great circle distance without landing. The USAF Lockheed HC-130H was flown from Ching Chuan Kang Air Base, Republic of China (Taiwan), to Scott AFB, Illinois in the United States. As of 2018, this record still stands more than 40 years later.

== Variants ==
HC-130B
Search and rescue version of the C-130B for United States Coast Guard (USCG) introduced in 1959, formerly R8V-1G and SC-130B.
HC-130E
Modified rescue version of the C-130E for USCG, originally designation was SC-130E.
HC-130H
Combat rescue version of the C-130E and C-130H for the United States Air Force (USAF) and enhanced SAR version for the USCG, with Fulton surface-to-air recovery system installed in USAF versions; many USAF versions later updated to HC-130P standard. Overall similar to HC-130E except for more powerful Allison T56-A-15 engines. 30 are built as of July 1977.
HC-130P Combat King
Extended range version of the HC-130H, modified for in-flight refueling of helicopters, refueling pods on underwing pylons, and additional internal fuel tanks in the cargo bay. Initial examples in series based on C-130E airframe until late 1960s. Later examples built in the 1980s and 1990s based on C-130H airframe.
HC-130P/N Combat King
Additional order of new HC-130Ps without Fulton surface-to-air recovery system or existing HC-130Ps with Fulton system removed.
HC-130J
Modified rescue version of the C-130J for USCG.
HC-130J Combat King II
USAF combat rescue variant of the C-130J with changes for in-flight refueling of helicopters, including refueling pods on underwing pylons and capabilities to receive fuel inflight from boom-equipped tankers. The USAF HC-130J eliminates the enlisted Flight Engineer position, but unlike the USAF C-130J airlift version, still retains a Combat Systems Officer/Navigator position.

== Operators ==
United States

- United States Air Force
- United States Coast Guard
- United States Forest Service

== Specifications (HC-130H) ==
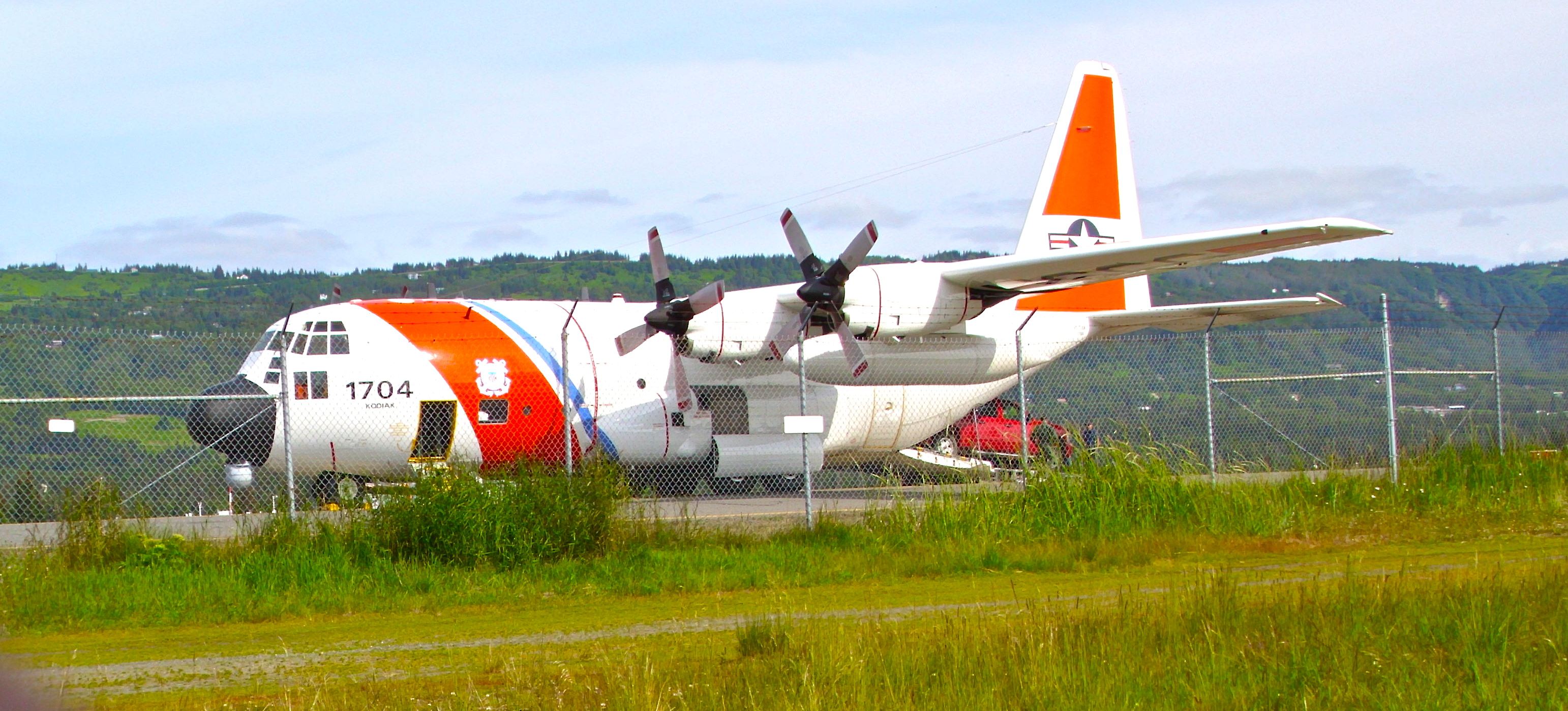
USCG HC-130 with loading ramp open

Data from USCG Specs

General characteristics

- Crew: USAF: 11; USCG: 5 to 7, contingent on mission
- Length: 97 ft 9 in (29.79 m)
- Wingspan: 132 ft 7 in (40.41 m)
- Height: 38 ft 3 in (11.66 m)
- Wing area: 1,745 sq ft (162.1 m^{2})
- Empty weight: 76,700 lb (34,791 kg)
- Max takeoff weight: 175,000 lb (79,379 kg)
- Fuel capacity: 62900
- Powerplant: 4 × Allison T56-A-15 turboprop engines, 4,300 shp (3,200 kW) each
- Propellers: 4-bladed

Performance

- Maximum speed: 380 mph (610 km/h, 330 kn)
- Cruise speed: 333 mph (536 km/h, 289 kn)
- Range: 5,178 mi (8,333 km, 4,500 nmi)
- Service ceiling: 33,000 ft (10,000 m)

== See also ==
Related development

- Lockheed C-130 Hercules
- Lockheed Martin C-130J Super Hercules
- Lockheed Martin KC-130
- MC-130P Combat Shadow

Aircraft of comparable role, configuration, and era

- Antonov An-12
- Transall C-160

Related lists

- List of Lockheed aircraft
- List of military aircraft of the United States
- List of United States military aerial refueling aircraft
