= 71st Rescue Squadron =

71st Rescue Squadron

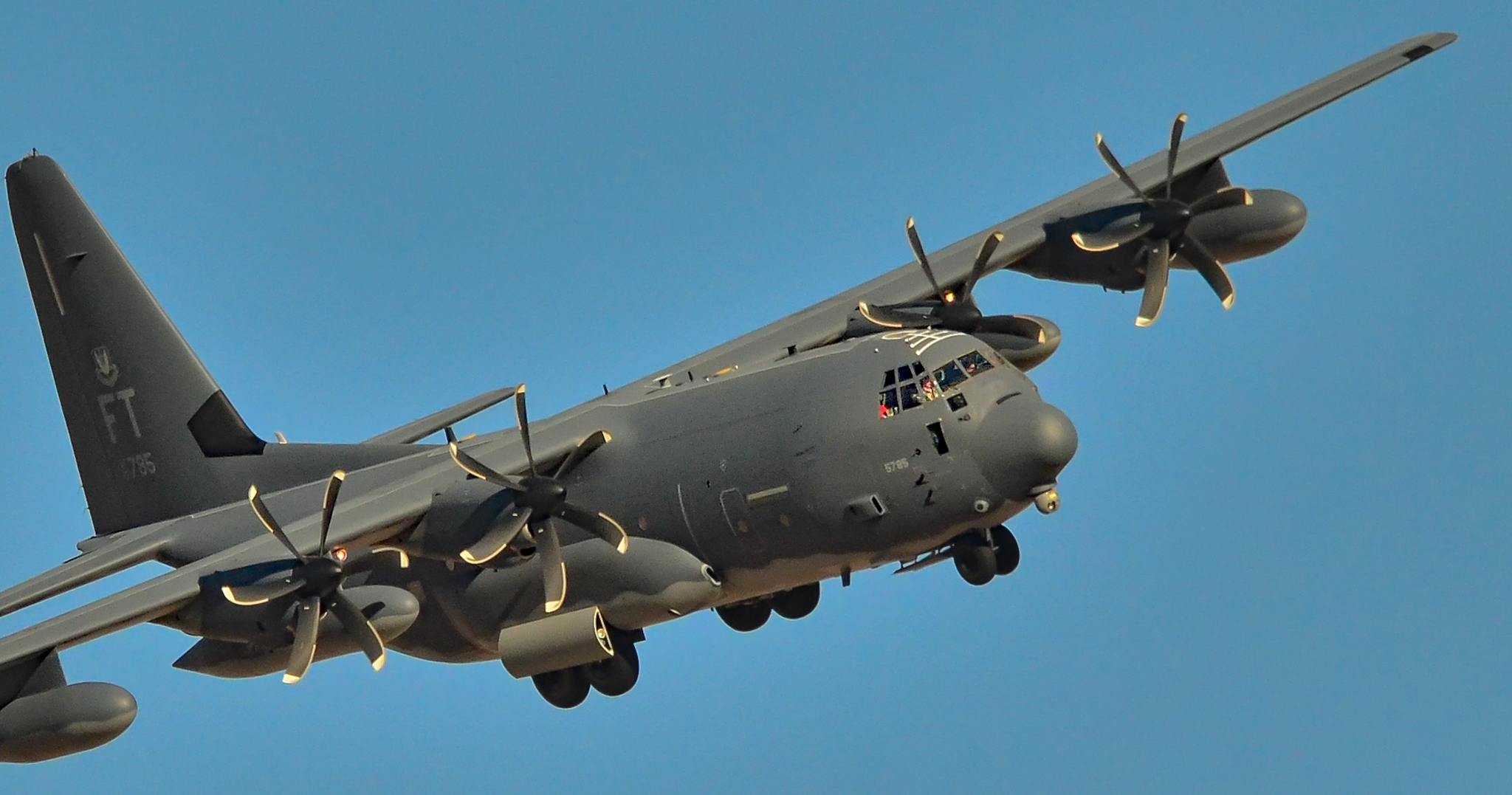
- Lockheed HC-130J Combat King II of the 71st Rescue Squadron
- Active: 1952-1960; 1970-1991; 1991 – present
- Country: United States
- Branch: United States Air Force
- Role: Combat Search and Rescue
- Part of: Air Combat Command; 23d Wing; 347th Rescue Group
- Garrison/HQ: Moody Air Force Base
- Equipment: HC-130J Combat King II
- Decorations: Air Force Meritorious Unit Award; Air Force Outstanding Unit Award

Insignia
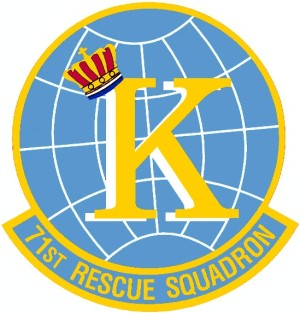
- 71st Rescue Squadron emblem (approved 8 June 1995)

The 71st Rescue Squadron is part of the 347th Rescue Group at Moody Air Force Base, Georgia. It flies HC-130J Combat King II aircraft conducting search and rescue missions.

== Mission ==
The 71st Rescue Squadron maintains combat-ready status Lockheed HC-130J Combat King II, combat search and rescue squadron. The squadron deploys expeditionary forces to execute personnel recovery operations worldwide to support theater commanders to advance national security interests. This mission requires the squadron to conduct low-level operations and air refueling using night vision goggles and airdrop pararescue personnel of other units for in support of combat personnel recovery.

== History ==
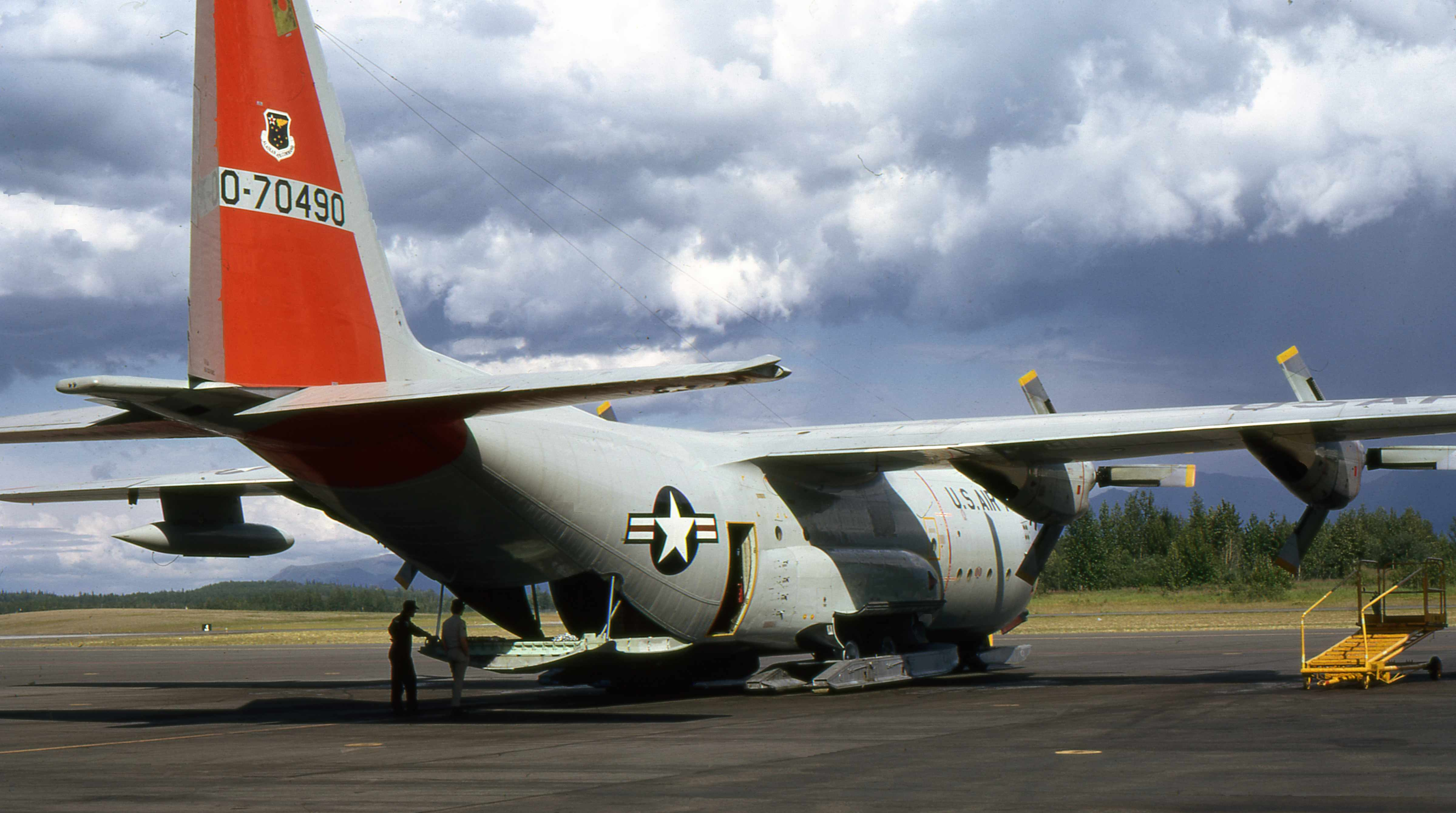
Ski equipped LC-130D of the 71st ARRS

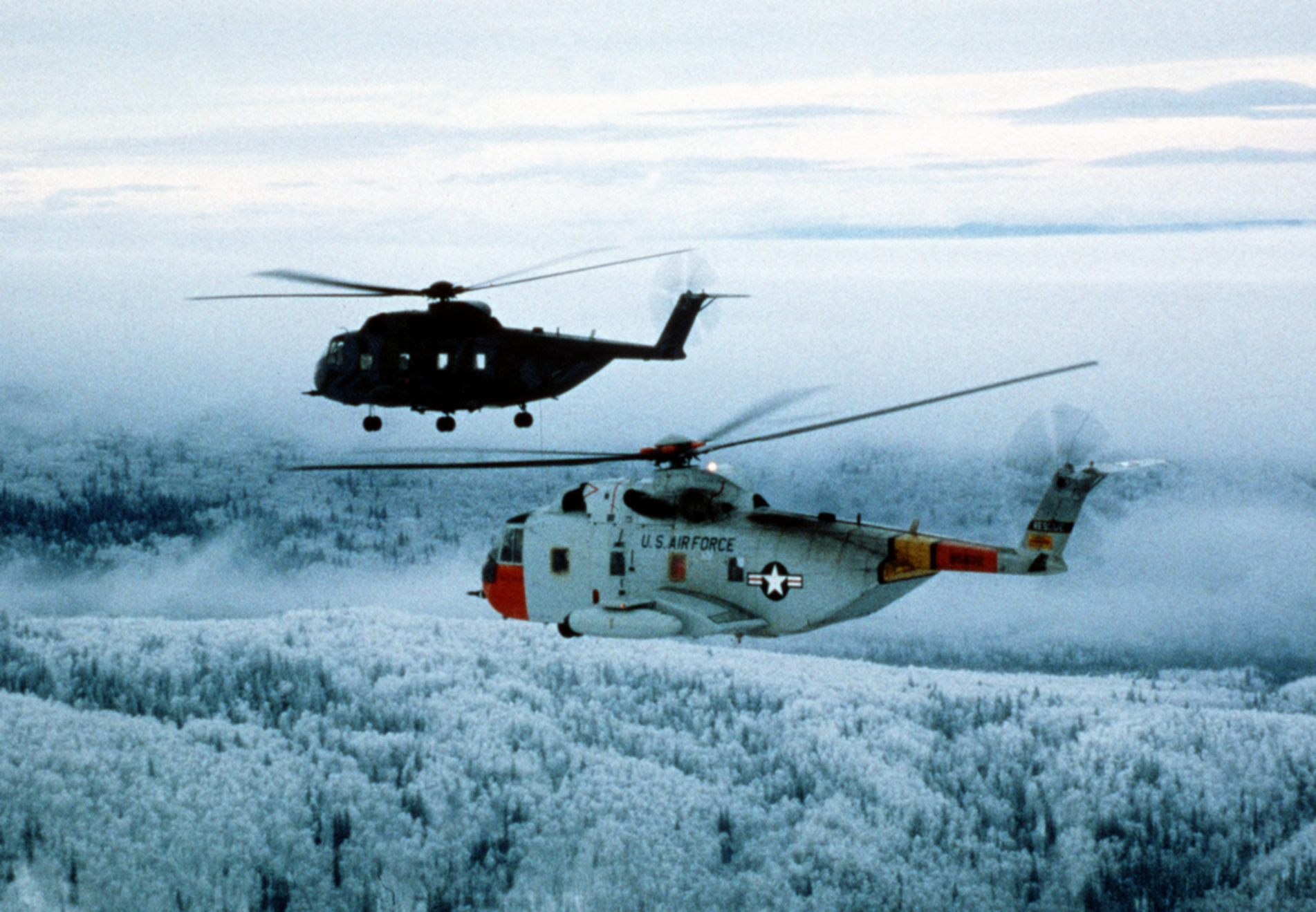
HH-3Es of the 71st ARRS over Alaska

=== Alaskan operations ===
The 71st was first activated in November 1952 when Air Rescue Service expanded its existing air rescue squadrons to groups and expanded their flights to separate squadrons. It flew search, rescue and recovery missions out of Elmendorf Air Force Base from 1952 to 1960 and 1970–1991. It has flown aerial refueling missions for search and rescue operations since 1991.

=== Reactivation in the Southeast ===
The squadron has supported the combat search and rescue mission in Southwest Asia with aircraft and crews since 1992. In August 2014, the 71st completed its last deployment with the HC-130P Combat King aircraft, which it has flown since 2003. This was the last deployment by an active duty squadron with the Combat King model. The squadron is now beginning to transition to the HC-130J Combat King II by September 2015.

== Lineage ==
- Constituted as the 71st Air Rescue Squadron on 17 October 1952

Activated on 14 November 1952
Discontinued and inactivated on 18 March 1960

- Redesignated 71st Aerospace Rescue and Recovery Squadron on 25 November 1969

Activated on 8 March 1970

- Redesignated 71st Air Rescue Squadron on 1 June 1989

Inactivated on 1 June 1991
Activated on 1 October 1991

- Redesignated 71st Rescue Squadron on 1 February 1993

=== Assignments ===
- 10th Air Rescue Group: 14 November 1952 (attached to Alaskan Air Command for operations after 1 August 1954)
- Air Rescue Service: 21 October 1957 – 18 March 1960 (continued attachment to Alaskan Air Command until 23 May 1958)
- 39th Aerospace Rescue and Recovery Wing: 8 March 1970 (attached to Detachment 1, 39th Aerospace Rescue and Recovery Wing until 30 June 1971, Elmendorf Rescue Coordination Center until 24 June 1972, Alaskan Air Command Rescue Coordination Center)
- 41st Aerospace Rescue and Recovery Wing (later 41st Rescue and Weather Reconnaissance Wing): 1 July 1974 (continued attachment to Alaskan Air Command Rescue Coordination Center)
- Air Rescue Service: 1 August 1989 – 1 June 1991 (continued attachment to Alaskan Air Command Rescue Coordination Center)
- Air Rescue Service: 1 October 1991
- 1st Operations Group: 1 February 1993
- 1st Rescue Group: 14 June 1995
- 347th Rescue Group: 1 April 1997 – Present

=== Stations ===
- Elmendorf Air Force Base, Alaska, 14 November 1952 – 18 March 1960
- Elmendorf Air Force Base, Alaska, 8 March 1970 – 1 June 1991
- Patrick Air Force Base, Florida, 1 October 1991
- Moody Air Force Base, Georgia, 1 April 1997 – Present

=== Aircraft ===
- Grumman SA-16 Albatross (1952–1960)
- Sikorsky H-5 Dragonfly (1954–1955)
- Douglas C-54 Skymaster (1954–1955)
- Sikirsky SH-19 Chickasaw (1954–1956)
- Douglas SC-54 Skymaster (1955–1958)
- Piasecki SH-21 Workhorse (1956–1960)
- Lockheed HC-130 Hercules (1970–1987, 1991 – present)

Lockheed HC-130P Combat King, 2003-c. 2014

- Sikirsky HH-3 Jolly Green Giant (1975–1991)
- Sikorsky CH-3 (1976–1979, 1981–1990)

=== Awards and campaigns ===
Award streamer	Award	Dates	Notes
	Air Force Meritorious Unit Award	1 June 2006-30 May 2007	71st Air Rescue Squadron
	Air Force Outstanding Unit Award	7 May 1956-20 May 1956	71st Aerospace Rescue & Recovery Squadron
	Air Force Outstanding Unit Award	1 July 1972-30 June 1974	71st Aerospace Rescue & Recovery Squadron
	Air Force Outstanding Unit Award	1 July 1974-31 May 1975	71st Aerospace Rescue & Recovery Squadron
	Air Force Outstanding Unit Award	1 September 1975-31 May 1977	71st Aerospace Rescue & Recovery Squadron
	Air Force Outstanding Unit Award	16 July 1977-16 July 1979	71st Aerospace Rescue & Recovery Squadron
	Air Force Outstanding Unit Award	17 July 1979-15 June 1981	71st Aerospace Rescue & Recovery Squadron
	Air Force Outstanding Unit Award	1 April 1984-31 March 1986	71st Aerospace Rescue & Recovery Squadron
	Air Force Outstanding Unit Award	1 April 1987-31 March 1988	71st Aerospace Rescue & Recovery Squadron
	Air Force Outstanding Unit Award	1 February 1993-30 Apr 1994	71st Rescue Squadron
	Air Force Outstanding Unit Award	1 June 2002-31 May 2003	71st Rescue Squadron
	Air Force Outstanding Unit Award	1 October 2003-31 October 2004	71st Rescue Squadron
	Air Force Outstanding Unit Award	1 November 2004-31 May 2006	71st Rescue Squadron

Campaign Streamer	Campaign	Dates	Notes
	Southwest Asia Cease-Fire	1 October 1991 – 30 November 1995	71st Air Rescue Squadron (later 71st Rescue Squadron)
