= 41st Rescue and Weather Reconnaissance Wing =

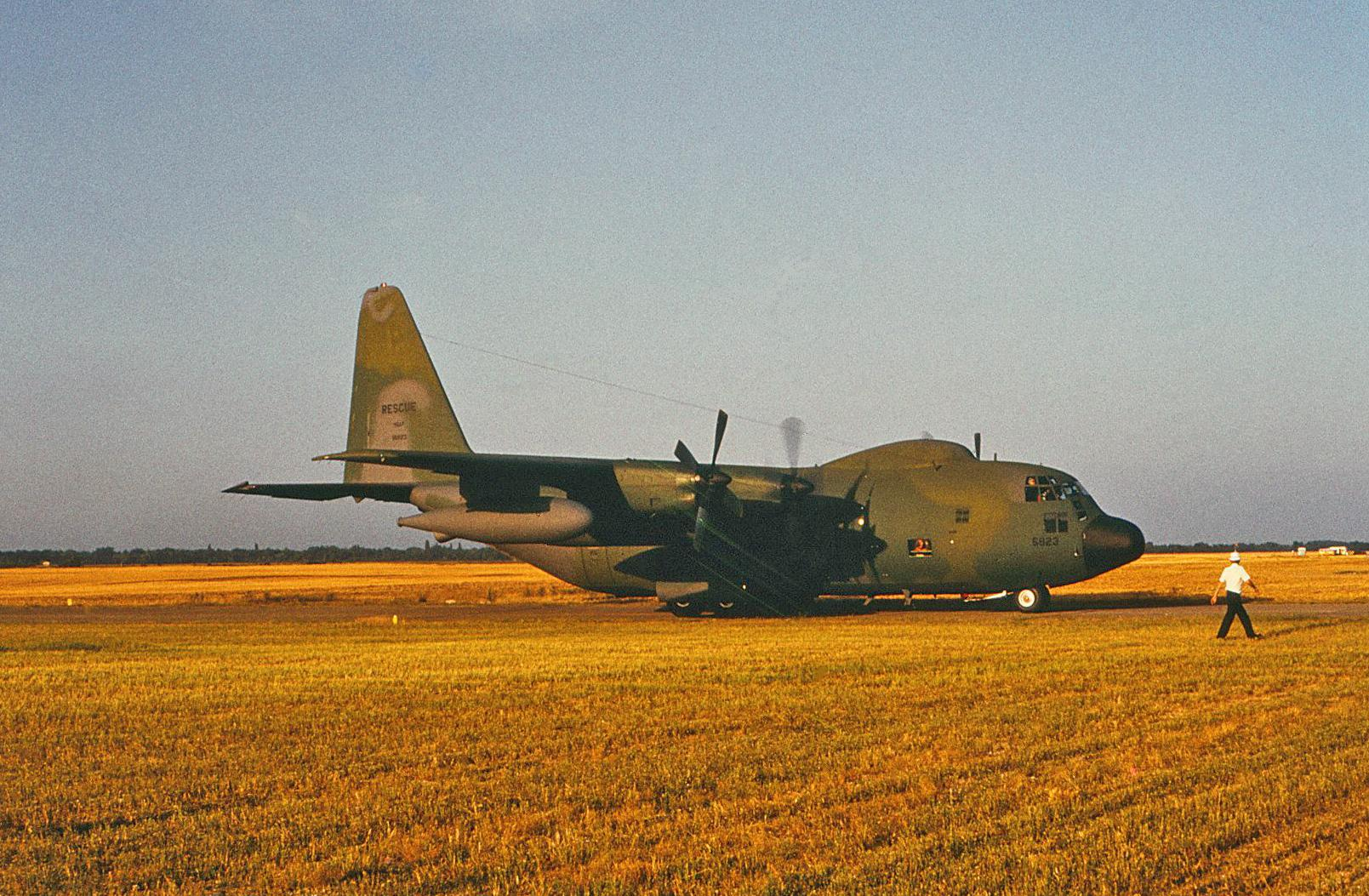
- HC-130N Hercules in 1983 (Note: Aircraft is Lockheed HC-130N-LM, serial 69-5823. This plane was later converted to MC-130P Combat Shadow, Dirkx, Marco (13 May 2024). "1969 USAF Serial Numbers". Joe Baugher’s Serial Number List.)
- Active: 1961–1989
- Country: United States
- Branch: United States Air Force
- Role: Search and rescue and Weather reconnaissance
- Motto: Vitae Dicati Conservandae (Latin for 'Dedicated to Saving Lives') (1969-1975) Serving Mankind (1975-1989)

Insignia
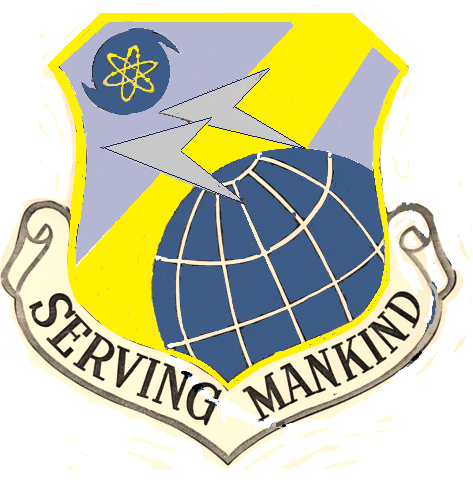
- 41st Rescue and Weather Reconnaissance Wing emblem

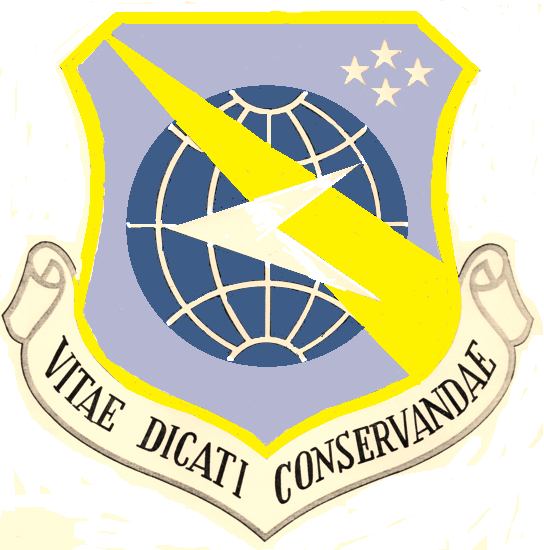
- 41st Aerospace Rescue And Recovery Wing emblem

The 41st Rescue and Weather Reconnaissance Wing is an inactive unit of the United States Air Force, last active in 1989 at McClellan Air Force Base, California. It was organized in October 1961 at as the Pacific Air Rescue Center, with responsibility of coordinating Air Force rescue operations in Pacific Air Forces' area of responsibility. In 1962, it began combat search and rescue operations in Southeast Asia. From 1967 it became the headquarters for rescue units in the Pacific, becoming the 41st Aerospace Rescue and Recovery Wing in 1969.

In 1975 the wing added weather reconnaissance and aerial sampling missions, moving to the United States and assuming its final designation before inactivating in 1989. It is most recently named the 41st Air Expeditionary Group, but has not been active with that name.

== History ==
The size of Air Rescue Service, steadily declined through the 1950s following the Korean War, reaching a low of three squadrons in 1960. However, starting in 1961, its mission and operations began to expand. As part of this expansion Air Rescue Service organized the Pacific Air Rescue Center at Hickam Air Force Base, Hawaii in October 1961. The center had no assigned units, although the 33d Air Rescue Squadron at Naha Air Base, Okinawa was attached to it. It had only 26 persons assigned and it mission was limited to providing a rescue and recovery center for Pacific Air Forces.

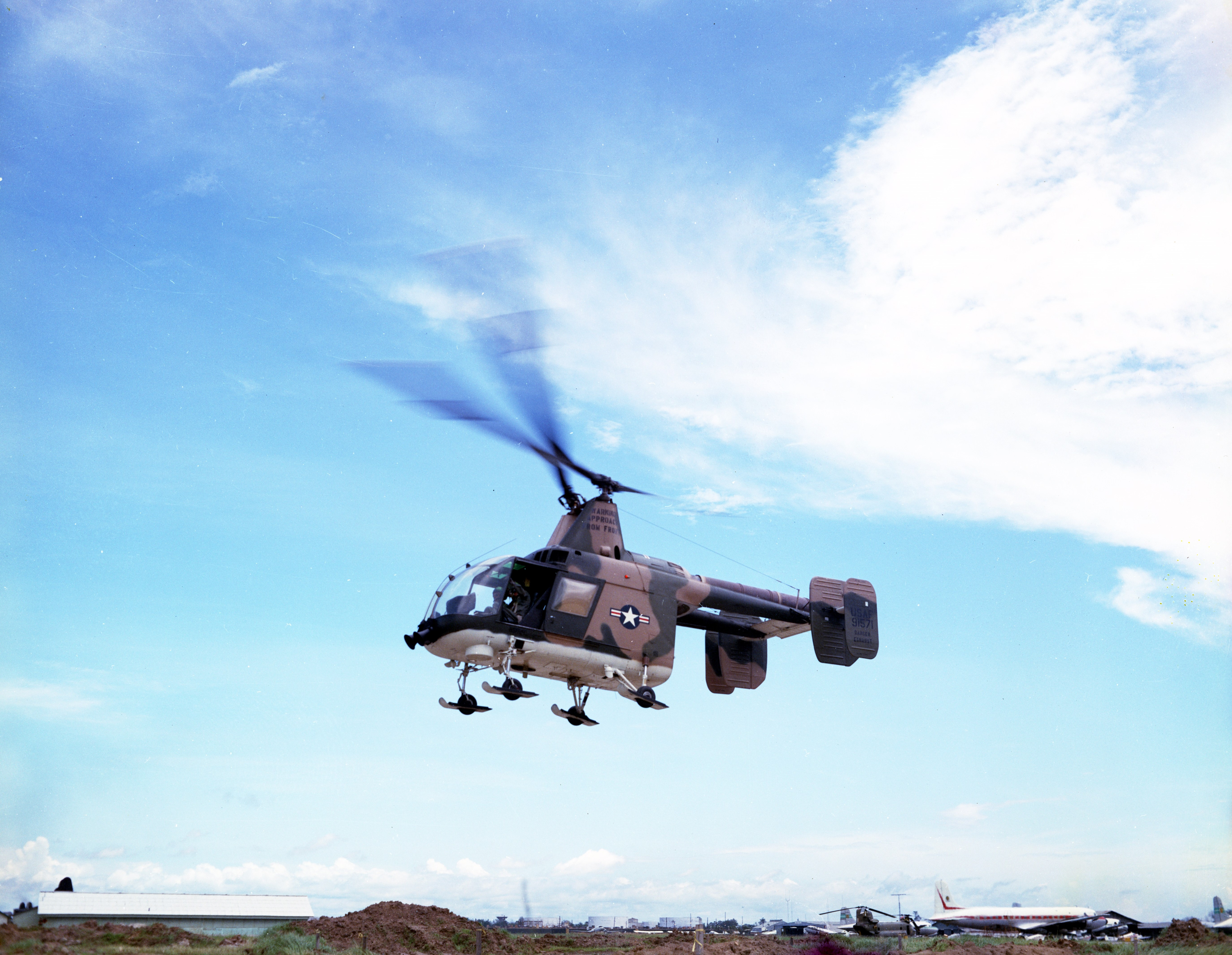
HH-43 taking off from Tan Son Nhut Airport

Air Rescue Service had not had the mission of combat search and rescue since the Korean War, but its expansion brought with it a renewed interest in combat rescue. On 10 January 1962, Detachment 3 of the center was established at Tan Son Nhut Airport, with the mission of establishing a search and rescue network to recover American airmen downed in Southeast Asia. The detachment had no aircraft assigned, but depended on Army and Marine aircraft to locate the crash and transport a rescue party there. Air Rescue Service Kaman HH-43 Huskies began operations at Da Nang and Bien Hoa Air Bases in February 1964. In October, Detachment 4 of the center was activated to rescue and recover aircrew operating in the Republic of Viet Nam. Although the Huskies were joined by Grumman HU-16 Albatrosss in 1964, the Albatrosses were not assigned to the center.

In January 1966, the center was renamed the Pacific Aerospace Rescue and Recovery Center, when the Air Force's distinction between "air rescue" and "air recovery" (Note: As opposed to rescue, air recovery units' primary mission was support of the space program.) units was eliminated. At the same time, Detachment 3 was discontinued and the 3d Aerospace Rescue and Recovery Group was activated and took command of rescue units in Southeast Asia.

On 1 April 1967, the center assumed command responsibility for the first time as it became the equivalent level of organization as a wing. It resumed responsibility for rescue missions in Southeast Asia when the 3rd Aerospace Rescue and Recovery Group was assigned to the center, along with squadrons in the Pacific area. However, operational control of the 3rd Group was with Seventh Air Force.

The center became the 41st Aerospace Rescue and Recovery Wing in February 1969, when Aerospace Rescue and Recovery Service renamed its wing level centers as numbered wings. In 1975, elements of the wing participated in the Mayaguez incident.

In 1975, Air Weather Service ended responsibility for weather reconnaissance and the 55th Weather Reconnaissance Squadron was transferred to the wing, which became the 41st Rescue and Weather Reconnaissance Wing. When Twenty-Third Air Force was organized in October 1983 to serve as a focal point within Military Airlift Command for dedicated special operations forces, Aerospace Rescue and Recovery Service forces, and other forces under its control, the wing was assigned to it. and inactivated in August 1989.

Since its inactivation, the wing has been redesignated twice and converted to provisional status, but has not been active.

== Lineage ==
- Constituted as the Pacific Air Rescue Center and activated on 2 August 1961 (not organized)

Organized on 8 October 1961
Redesignated Pacific Aerospace Rescue and Recovery Center on 8 January 1966
Redesignated 41st Aerospace Rescue and Recovery Wing on 7 February 1969
Redesignated 41st Rescue and Weather Reconnaissance Wing on 1 September 1975
Inactivated on 1 August 1989
Redesignated 41st Air Rescue Wing (not active)
Redesignated 41st Air Expeditionary Group and converted to provisional status on 21 October 2005 (not active)

=== Assignments ===
- Military Air Transport Service, 2 August 1961 (Not organized)
- Air Rescue Service (later Aerospace Rescue and Recovery Service), 8 August 1962
- Twenty-Third Air Force, 1 October 1983 – 1 August 1989

=== Components ===
Group

- 3d Aerospace Rescue and Recovery Group, 8 January 1966 – 31 January 1976

Tan Son Nhut Airport, Republic of Viet Nam, 8 January 1966; Nakon Phanom Royal Thai Air Force Base, Thailand, 15 February 1973; U-Tapao Royal Thai Naval Airfield, Thailand, 15 September 1975 – 31 January 1976

Operational Squadrons

- 31st Aerospace Rescue and Recovery Squadron, 1 April 1967 – 1 July 1975, 8 January 1981 – 6 April 1989

Clark Air Base, Philippines, 1 April 1967 – 1 July 1975; Osan Air Base, Korea, 8 January 1981 – 6 April 1989

- 33d Air Rescue Squadron, (later 33rd Air Recovery Squadron, 33rd Aerospace Rescue and Recovery Squadron,, 33rd Air Rescue Squadron), attached 8 October 1961 – 1 April 1967, assigned 1 April 1967 – 1 October 1970, 1 July 1971 – 1 August 1989

Naha Air Base, Okinawa, 8 October 1961 – 1 October 1970; Kadena Air Base, Okinawa, 1 July 1971 – 1 August 1989

- 36th Aerospace Rescue and Recovery Squadron, 1 April 1967 – 30 November 1972

Tachikawa Air Base, Japan, 1 April 1967; Yokota Air Base, Japan, 1 December 1969; Kadena Air Base, Japan, 11 November 1972 – 30 November 1972

- 37th Aerospace Rescue and Recovery Squadron, 20 August 1972 – 29 December 1972 (attached to 3rd Aerospace Rescue and Recovery Group)

Da Nang Air Base, Republic of Viet Nam, 20 August 1972 – 29 December 1972

- 38th Aerospace Rescue and Recovery Squadron (later 38th Air Rescue Squadron), 8 January 1981 – 1 August 1989

Osan Air Base, Korea, 8 January 1981 – 1 August 1989

- 41st Aerospace Rescue and Recovery Squadron (later 41st Air Rescue Squadron), 1 March – 1 August 1989

Patrick Air Force Base, Florida, 1 March – 1 August 1989

- 47th Aerospace Rescue and Recovery Squadron, 1 June 1970 – unknown

Fuchu Air Station, Japan, 1 June 1970 – unknown

- 48th Aerospace Rescue and Recovery Squadron, 1 January 1976 – 1 August 1976

Fairchild Air Force Base, Washington, 1 January 1976 – 1 August 1976

- 53rd Weather Reconnaissance Squadron, 1 September 1975 – 1 August 1989

Keesler Air Force Base, Mississippi, 1 September 1975 – 1 August 1989

- 54th Weather Reconnaissance Squadron, 1 September 1975 – 30 September 1987

Andersen Air Force Base, Guam, 1 September 1975 – 30 September 1987

- 55th Weather Reconnaissance Squadron, 1 September 1975 – 1 August 1989

McClellan Air Force Base, California, 1 September 1975 – 1 August 1989

- 56th Aerospace Rescue and Recovery Squadron (later 56th Air Rescue Squadron), 20 August 1972 – 15 October 1975, 1 April 1989 – 1 August 1989

Korat Royal Thai Air Force Base, Thailand, 20 August 1972 – 15 October 1975; Keflavik Naval Air Station, Iceland, 1 April 1989 – 1 August 1989

- 71st Aerospace Rescue and Recovery Squadron (later 71st Air Rescue Squadron), 1 July 1974 – 1 August 1989 (attached to Alaskan Air Command Rescue Coordination Center)

Elmendorf Air Force Base, Alaska, 1 July 1974 – 1 August 1989

- 76th Aerospace Rescue and Recovery Squadron, 1 April 1967 – 1 August 1975

Hickam Air Force Base, Hawaii, 1 April 1967 – 1 August 1975

- 79th Aerospace Rescue and Recovery Squadron, 1 April 1967 – 30 June 1972

Andersen Air Force Base, Guam, 1 April 1967 – 30 June 1972

- Aerospace Rescue and Recovery Squadron, 1646, Provisional, attached 9 February – 8 August 1968

Osan Air Base, Korea

Maintenance Squadrons

- 11th Consolidated Aircraft Maintenance Squadron, 1 September 1975 – 1 December 1978

McClellan Air Force Base, California, 1 September 1975 – 1 December 1978

- 41st Consolidated Aircraft Maintenance Squadron, 1 December 1978 – 30 September 1987

McClellan Air Force Base, California, 1 December 1978 – 30 September 1987

=== Stations ===
- Hickam Air Force Base, Hawaii. 8 October 1961
- McClellan Air Force Base, California, 1 September 1975 – 1 August 1989 (Note: The wing was programmed to be inactivated in February 1969, but the direction to do so was revoked.)

=== Aircraft ===
Fixed wing

Lockheed HC-130, 1966–1989
Lockheed WC-130, 1975–1989
Boeing WC-135C, 1975–1989
Grumman HU-16 Albatross, 1966-1968

Helicopter

Bell HH-1 Huey, 1975–1978
Sikorsky HH-3 Jolly Green Giant, 1967–1989
Kaman HH-43 Huskie, 1964–1975
Sikorsky HH-53 Super Jolly, 1967–1987

=== Awards ===
Award streamer	Award	Dates	Notes
	Air Force Outstanding Unit Award	1 July 1964 – 30 June 1966	Pacific Air Rescue Center (later Pacific Aerospace Rescue and Recovery Center)
	Air Force Outstanding Unit Award	1 July 1966 – 31 May 1968	Pacific Aerospace Rescue and Recovery Center
	Air Force Outstanding Unit Award	1 June 1969 – 31 May 1971	41st Aerospace Rescue and Recovery Wing
	Air Force Outstanding Unit Award	1 June 1971 – 31 May 1973	41st Aerospace Rescue and Recovery Wing
	Air Force Outstanding Unit Award	1 June 1973 – 31 May 1975	41st Aerospace Rescue and Recovery Wing
	Air Force Outstanding Unit Award	1 September 1975 – 1 May 1977	41st Rescue and Weather Reconnaissance Wing
	Air Force Outstanding Unit Award	16 July 1977 – 16 July 1979	41st Rescue and Weather Reconnaissance Wing
	Air Force Outstanding Unit Award	17 July 1979 – 15 June 1981	41st Rescue and Weather Reconnaissance Wing
	Air Force Outstanding Unit Award	1 April 1984 – 31 March 1986	41st Rescue and Weather Reconnaissance Wing
	Air Force Outstanding Unit Award	1 April 1986 – 31 March 1988	41st Rescue and Weather Reconnaissance Wing
	Navy Meritorious Unit Commendation	1 July 1967 – 26 July 1969	Pacific Aerospace Rescue and Recovery Center (later 41st Aerospace Rescue and Recovery Wing)

== See also ==
- List of inactive AFCON wings of the United States Air Force
- List of C-130 Hercules operators
