= 33rd Rescue Squadron =

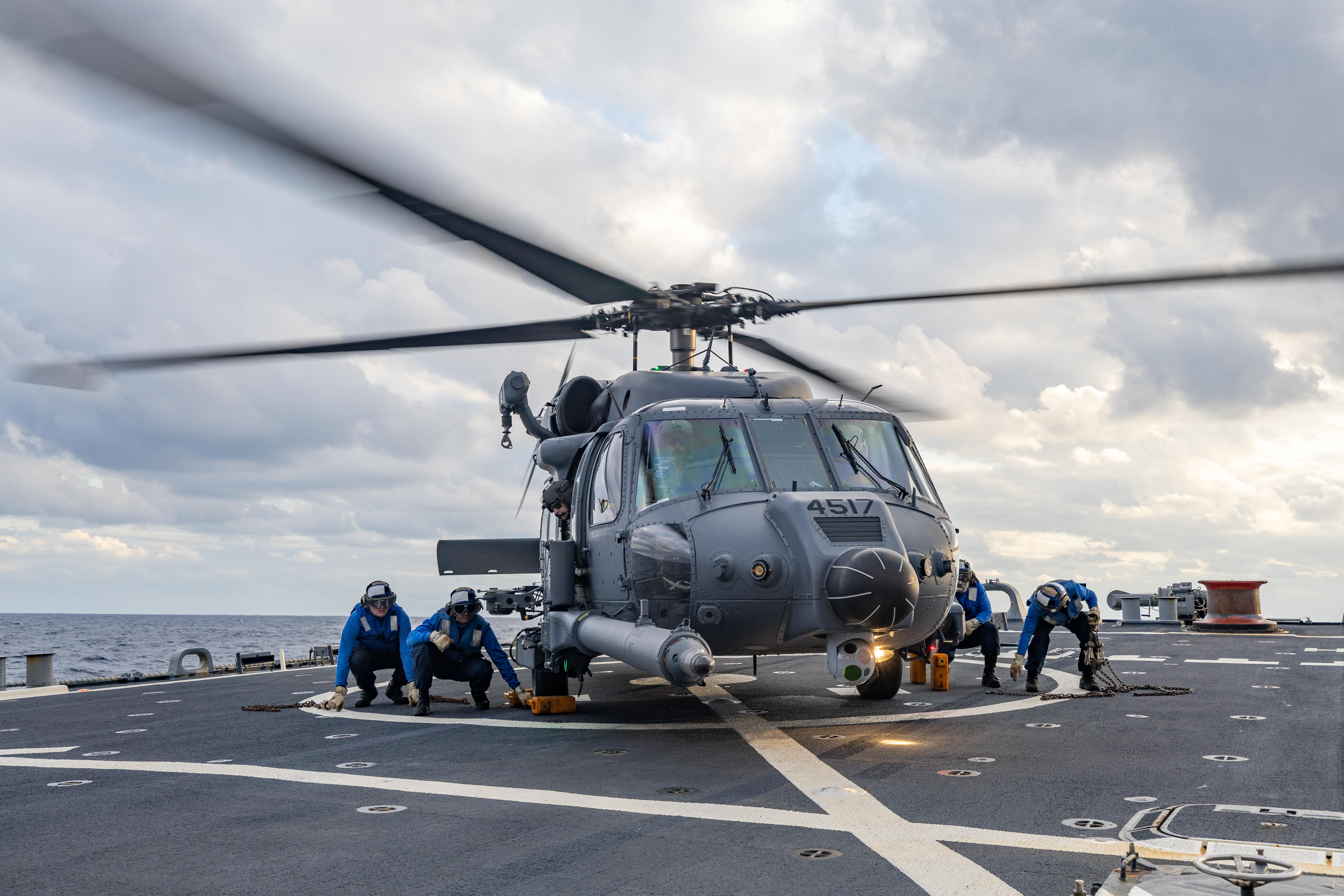
- 33rd Rescue Squadron HH-60W Jolly Green II
- Active: 1952–1960; 1961–1970; 1971–present
- Country: United States
- Branch: United States Air Force
- Role: Search and Rescue
- Part of: Pacific Air Forces
- Garrison/HQ: Kadena Air Base
- Motto: That Others May Live
- Engagements: Vietnam War
- Decorations: Air Force Meritorious Unit Award; Air Force Outstanding Unit Award; Navy Meritorious Unit Commendation; Republic of Vietnam Gallantry Cross with Palm

Insignia
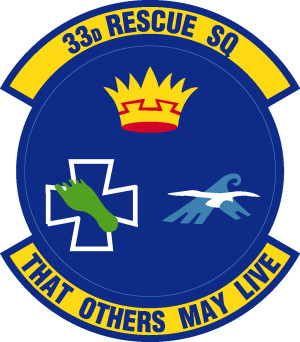
- 33d Rescue Squadron emblem (approved 21 March 1978)

The 33rd Rescue Squadron is part of the 18th Wing at Kadena Air Base, Japan. It operates Sikorsky HH-60W Jolly Green II aircraft conducting search and rescue missions.

The squadron was established when the 2nd Air Rescue Squadron was expanded to Group status in 1952. Since that time, it has carried out air rescue duties with fixed wing aircraft until 1952, and thereafter with both fixed wing aircraft and helicopters. It has been stationed almost continuously in Okinawa since the 1950s.

== History ==
=== Initial activation at Kadena Air Base ===
In 1952, Air Rescue Service expanded its existing squadrons to groups. In this reorganization, the 2d Air Rescue Squadron became a group, and the 33d Air Rescue Squadron was activated at Kadena Air Base, Okinawa with the mission of the former Flight C of the 2d Squadron. The squadron performed search and rescue and recovery missions from Kadena (and later from nearby Naha Air Base until it was discontinued in March 1960.

=== Reactivation at Naha Air Base ===
Fifteen months after being discontinued, the 33d was again organized at Naha, performing the same mission. From 1965 to 1967 the squadron flew missions in support of the Vietnam War Following the seizure of the USS Pueblo (AGER-2) by North Korea, the 33d supported operations between 29 January and 16 September 1968. The squadron was inactivated in October 1970 as the Air Force drew down its operations at Naha.

=== Return to Kadena Air Base ===
The squadron returned to its initial base when it was reactivated on 1 July 1971. After a Soviet fighter aircraft shot down South Korean airliner, Korean Air Lines Flight 007 the squadron. aided search efforts and salvage operations from September to October 1983.

On 17 January 2006, a squadron HH-60 rescued the pilot of an F-15C of the 44th Fighter Squadron that had ejected into the Pacific Ocean near Okinawa.

The squadron won the 2009 Vern Orr Award for most effective use of people and resources in pursuit of the mission.

Four members of the squadron here were named the 2009 MacKay Trophy winners. The MacKay Trophy is awarded annually by the National Aeronautic Association for the "most meritorious flight of the year." Capt Robert Rosebrough, 1Lt Lucas Will, MSgt Dustin Thomas and SSgt Tim Philpott formed the crew of a Sikorsky HH-60G Pave Hawk combat search and rescue helicopter, with the call sign "Pedro 16", and were honored for saving the crew of a downed Air Force aircraft and three soldiers in Afghanistan. The crew was deployed as part of the 129th Expeditionary Rescue Squadron at Kandahar Air Base, Afghanistan. On 29 July 2009, "Pedro 16" and another helicopter, "Pedro 15" were on a medical evacuation mission of soldiers who had been wounded near Forward Operating Base Frontenac when their convoy was hit with an IED. The helicopters came under enemy fire, which downed "Pedro 15". "Pedro 16"'s crew, along with Army Bell OH-58 Kiowa crews, helped return the wounded soldiers and crew of "Pedro 15" to safety. The crew had previously been honored by the Jolly Green Association for this flight as the most outstanding rescue mission of the year.

Squadron members were also honored with the 2011 MacKay Trophy, which was awarded to the crews of "Pedro 83" flight who distinguished themselves in combat search and rescue operations on 23 April 2011 while assigned to the 83d Expeditionary Rescue Squadron at Bagram Air Base, Afghanistan.

== Lineage ==
- Constituted as the 33d Air Rescue Squadron on 17 October 1952

Activated on 14 November 1952
Discontinued on 18 March 1960

- Organized on 18 June 1961

Redesignated 33d Air Recovery Squadron on 1 July 1965
Redesignated 33d Aerospace Rescue and Recovery Squadron on 8 January 1966
Inactivated on 1 October 1970

- Activated on 1 July 1971

Redesignated 33d Air Rescue Squadron on 1 June 1989
Redesignated 33d Rescue Squadron on 1 February 1993

=== Assignments ===
- 2d Air Rescue Group, 14 November 1952 (attached to Twentieth Air Force until 1 Mar 1955, then to 3d Air Rescue Group)
- 3d Air Rescue Group, 20 September 1955
- 2d Air Rescue Group, 18 June 1957
- Air Rescue Service, 24 June 1958 – 18 March 1960 (attached to Pacific Air Forces until 17 Mar 1959, then to Detachment 2, Air Rescue Service (Pacific Recovery Operations Center)
- Air Rescue Service (later Aerospace Rescue and Recovery Service), 18 June 1961 (attached to Detachment 1, Air Rescue Service (Pacific Recovery Operations Center) until 8 October 1961. then to Pacific Air Rescue Center (later Pacific Aerospace Rescue and Recovery Center)
- Pacific Aerospace Rescue and Recovery Center (later 41st Aerospace Rescue and Recovery Wing), 1 April 1967 – 1 October 1970
- 41st Aerospace Rescue and Recovery Wing (later 41st Rescue and Weather Reconnaissance Wing), 1 July 1971
- Air Rescue Service, 1 August 1989
- 18th Operations Group, 1 February 1993 – present

=== Stations ===
- Kadena Air Base, Okinawa, 14 November 1952
- Naha Air Base, Okinawa, 14 April 1955 – 18 March 1960
- Naha Air Base, Okinawa, 18 June 1961 – 1 October 1970
- Kadena Air Base, Okinawa, 1 July 1971 – present

=== Aircraft ===
- SA-16 Albatross (1952–1960)
- SH-19 Chickasaw (1952–1960)
- SC-47 Skytrain (1952–1956)
- HU-16 Albatross (1961–1968)
- HH-19 Chickasaw (1961–1964)
- HH-43 Huskie (1964–1966, 1971–1972)

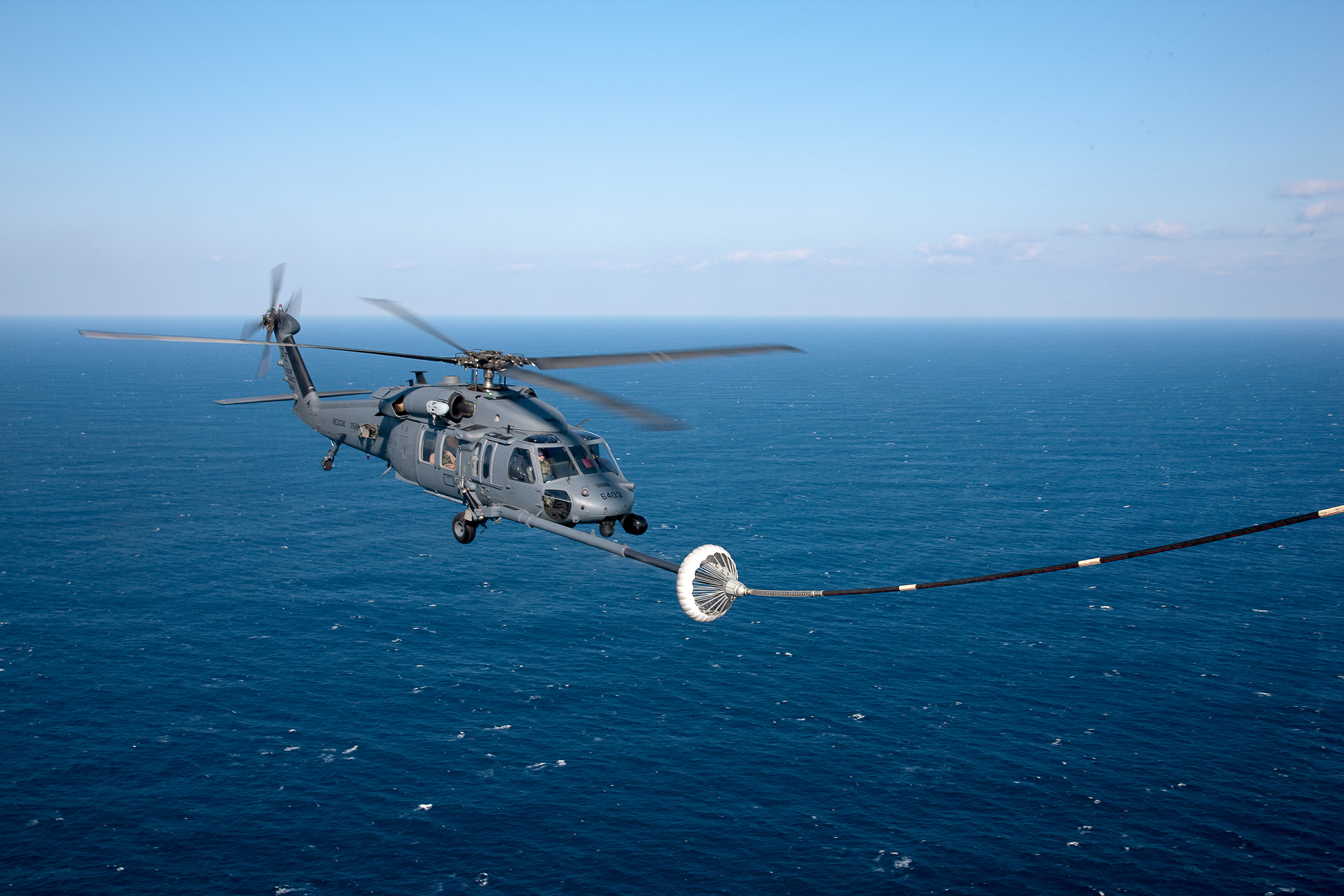
An MC-130P refuels a 33d Rescue Squadron HH-60 Pave Hawk assisting earthquake relief in Japan.

- C-54 Skymaster (1966)
- HH-3 (1968–1970, 1971–1975, 1982 – )
- HC-130 Hercules (1972–1989)
- HH-53 Super Jolly Green Giant (1975–1982)
- HH-3E Jolly Green Giant (1982–1994)
- HH-60 Pave Hawk (1993–2024)
- HH-60W Jolly Green II (2024–present)

== See also ==
- List of United States Air Force rescue squadrons
