= 31st Rescue Squadron =

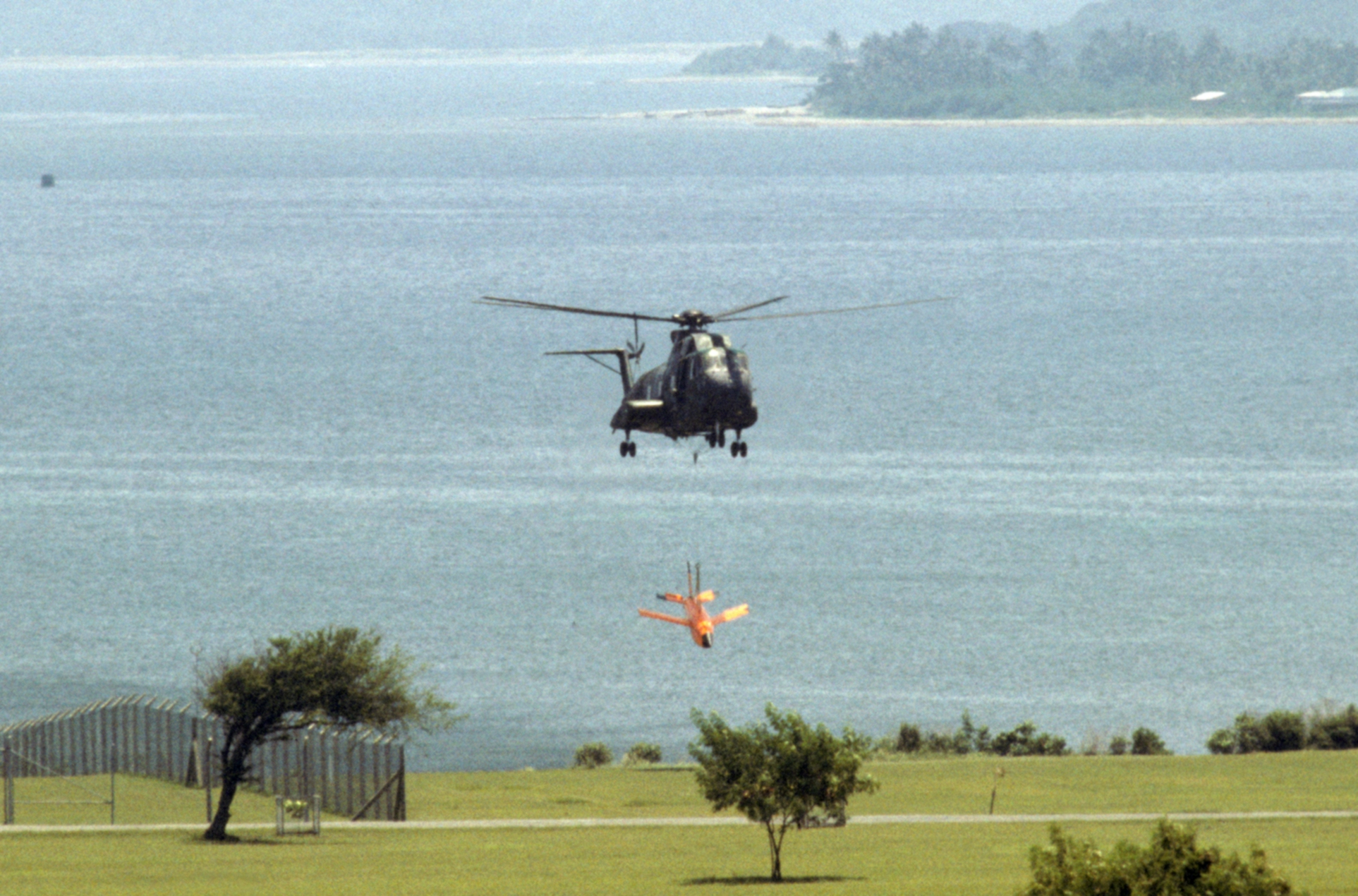
- 31st Aerospace Rescue & Recovery Squadron HH-3E retrieving a Firebee drone in 1984
- Active: 1952–1960; 1963–1975; 1981–2001; 2003–present
- Country: United States
- Branch: United States Air Force
- Role: Search and Rescue
- Part of: Pacific Air Forces
- Garrison/HQ: Kadena Air Base
- Decorations: Air Force Outstanding Unit Award with Combat "V" Device; Air Force Outstanding Unit Award; Navy Meritorious Unit Commendation; Republic of Vietnam Gallantry Cross with Palm; Philippine Presidential Unit Citation

Insignia
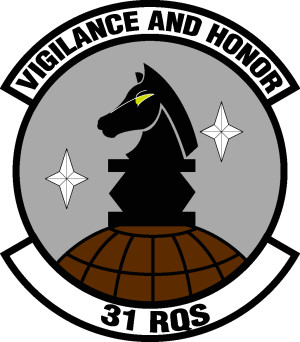
- 31st Rescue Squadron emblem (Note: Approved 15 September 1993. Description: Argent (Silver Gray), a chess knight Sable, perched on a Brown demi-globe issuant from base between two pole stars Argent, all within a diminished bordure of the second [color].)

- 31st Air Rescue Squadron emblem (Note: Approved 7 August 1953.)

The 31st Rescue Squadron is part of the 18th Wing at Kadena Air Base, Japan. It trains, equips and employs combat-ready pararescue specialists. Formed in 1952 as the 31st Air Rescue Squadron, it took part in combat search and rescue operations in Southeast Asia and disaster relief missions in the Philippines.

== History ==
The 31st Rescue Squadron was constituted as the 31st Air Rescue Squadron on 17 October 1952. It made combat rescues in Southeast Asia, 1965–1966 and also operated the Joint Rescue Coordination Center for Thirteenth Air Force, Apr 1967 – July 1975. They took part in disaster relief missions in the Philippines between 16 and 31 July 1990. As a USAF Special Operations Squadron the 31st was forward deployed at Osan Air Base, Korea from 1992 to 2001, while its headquarters at the 353d Special Operations Group was stationed at Kadena Air Base, Okinawa, Japan. Inactivated for a couple of years, in 2003 the squadron was redesignated the 31st Rescue Squadron under the 18th Operations Group and stationed at Kadena Air Base, Okinawa, Japan.

== Lineage ==
- Constituted as the 31st Air Rescue Squadron on 17 October 1952

Activated on 14 November 1952
Discontinued on 18 September 1960

- Organized on 8 July 1963

Redesignated 31st Aerospace Rescue and Recovery Squadron on 8 January 1966
Inactivated on 1 July 1975

- Activated on 8 January 1981

Redesignated 31st Special Operations Squadron on 6 April 1989
Inactivated on 31 August 2001

- Redesignated 31st Rescue Squadron on 16 May 2003

Activated on 31 July 2003

=== Assignments ===
- 2d Air Rescue Group, 14 November 1952
- Air Rescue Service, 24 June 1958 – 18 September 1960
- Air Rescue Service (later Aerospace Rescue and Recovery Service), 8 July 1963 (attached to Pacific Air Rescue Center (later Pacific Aerospace Rescue and Recovery) Center, until 31 March 1967)
- Pacific Aerospace Rescue and Recovery Center (later 41st Aerospace Rescue and Recovery Wing), 1 April 1967 – 1 July 1975
- 41st Rescue and Weather Reconnaissance Wing, 8 January 1981
- 353d Special Operations Wing (later 353d Special Operations Group) 6 April 1989 – 31 August 2001
- 18th Operations Group, 31 July 2003 – present

=== Stations ===
- Clark Air Base, Philippines, 14 November 1952
- Naha Air Base, Okinawa, 12–18 September 1960
- Clark Air Base, Philippines, 8 July 1963 – 1 July 1975
- Clark Air Base, Philippines, 8 January 1981
- Ching Chuan Kang Air Base, Taiwan, 10 May 1965 – 31 May 1975
- Marine Corps Air Station Futenma, Okinawa, Japan, 29 June 1991
- Osan Air Base, South Korea, July 1992 – 31 August 2001
- Kadena Air Base, Okinawa, Japan, 31 July 2003 – present

=== Aircraft ===
- Grumman SA-16 Albatross, 1952–1960
- Sikorsky H-19 Chickasaw, 1952–1955
- Sikorsky SH-19 (later HH-19), 1955–1960, 1963–1964
- Douglas HC-54, 1964–1965
- Kaman HH-43 Huskie, 1964–1970, 1971–1972
- Boeing HC-97, 1965–1966
- Lockheed HC-130 Hercules, 1966–1975
- Sikorsky HH-3, 1968–1975, 1981–1990
- Sikorsky CH-3, 1981–1990
- Sikorsky MH-53, 1990–2001
- Boeing MH-47 Chinook, 2001

== See also ==
- List of United States Air Force rescue squadrons
