= Aerospace Rescue and Recovery Service =

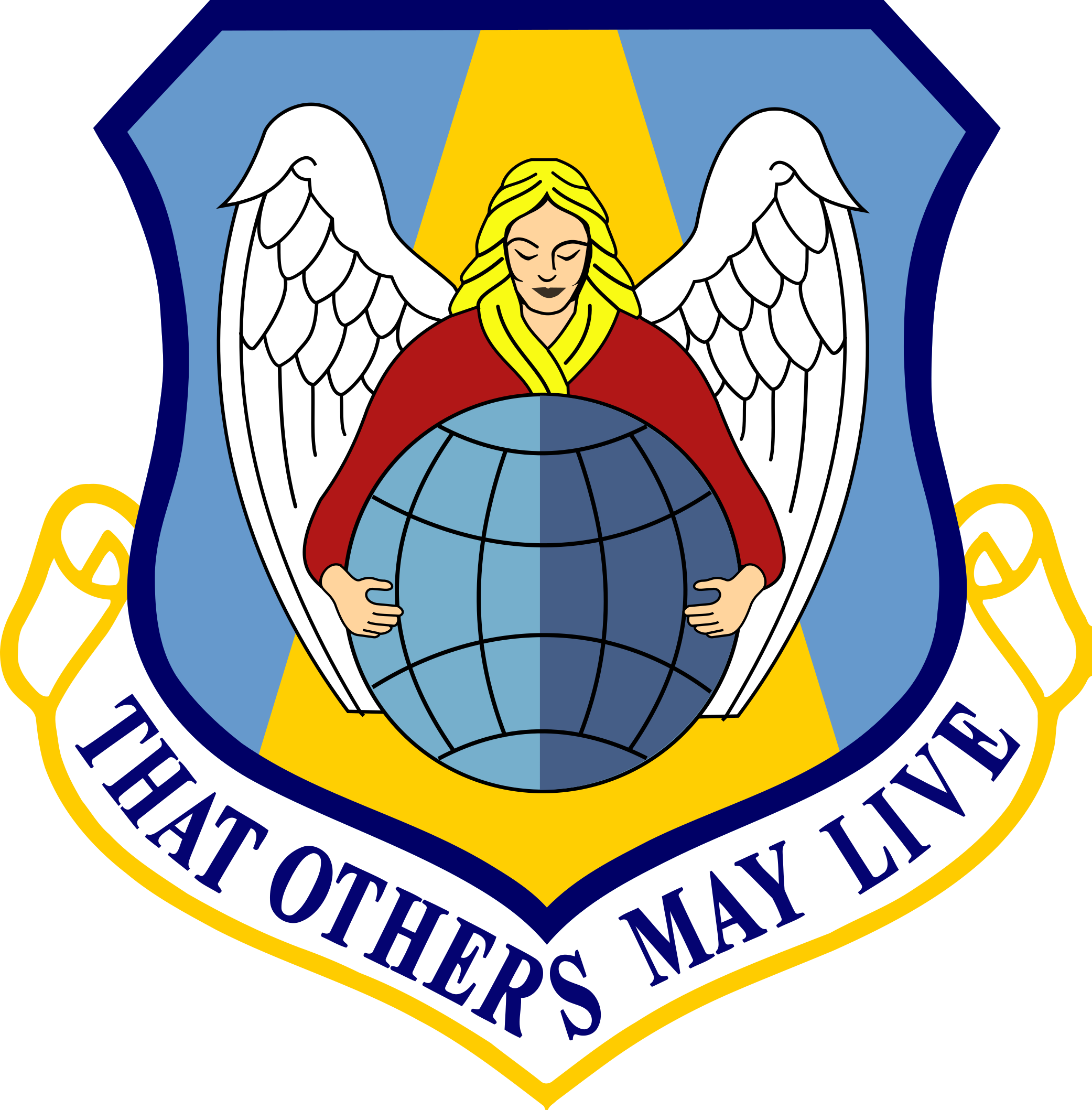
- Combat Rescue School Shield
- Active: 1946-1995
- Country: United States of America
- Branch: United States Air Force
- Role: Search and Rescue
- Motto: That Others may Live"

Insignia
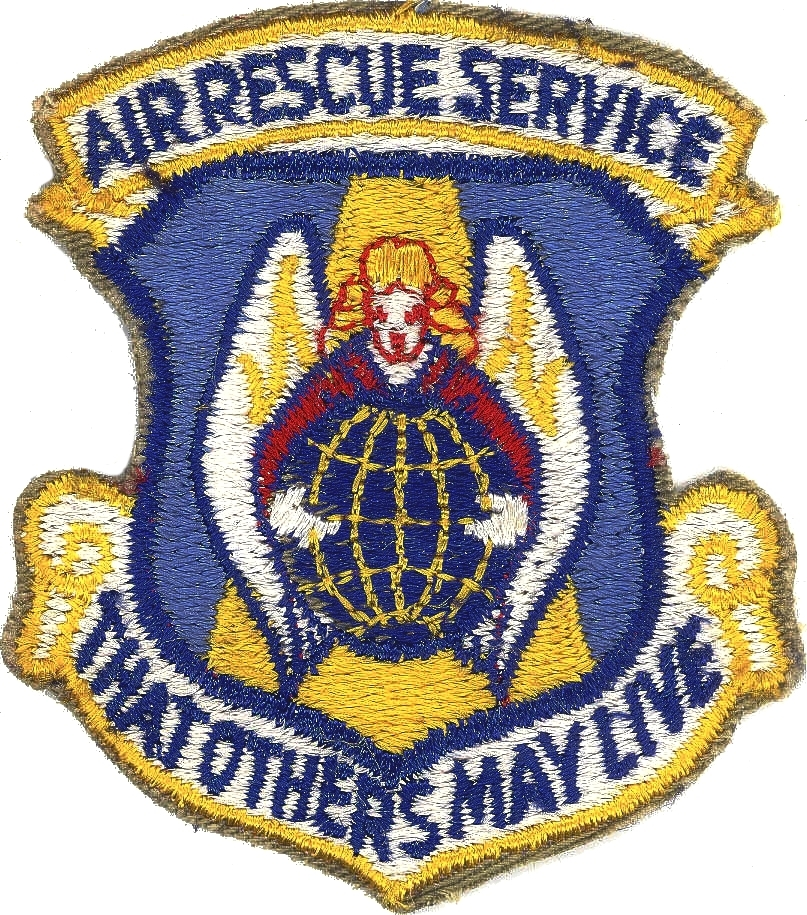
- Original Air Rescue Service Shield

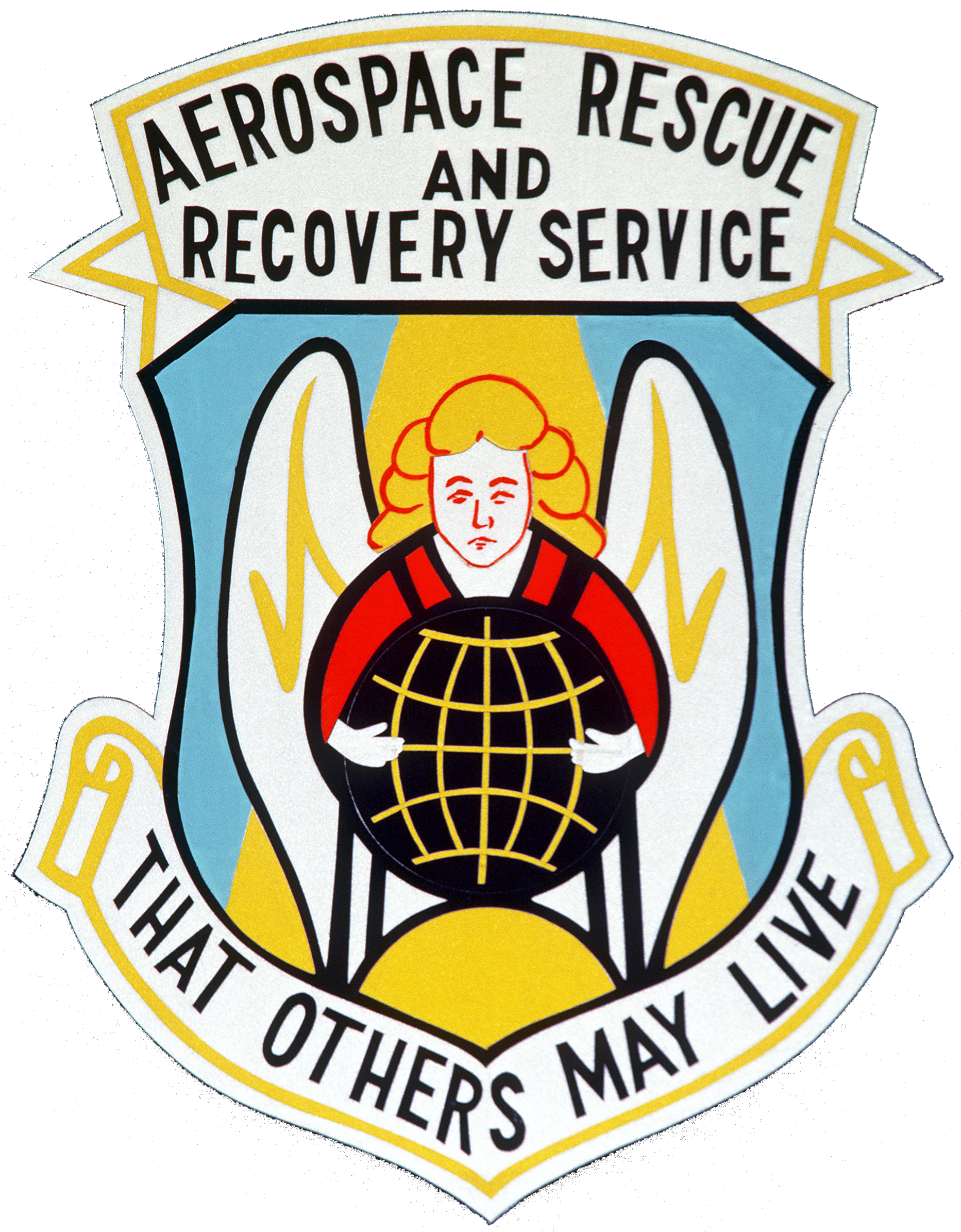
- Former Aerospace Rescue and Recovery Service Shield

Aircraft flown
- Helicopter: H-19, HH-43, HH-3, HH-53
- Transport: HU-16, HC-130

The Aerospace Rescue and Recovery Service (ARRS) was the most long-established and notable name for a body of the United States Army (very briefly) and then Air Force that began its existence as the Air Rescue Service (1946-1966); became the ARRS (1966-1993); and then was briefly designated the United States Air Force Combat Rescue School (1993-1995), before being inactivated.

It was established in 1946 as the Air Rescue Service' under Air Transport Command, little more than a year before the United States Air Force's designation as a separate military service in September 1947. From June 1948 until 1983, it was a technical service of Military Air Transport Service (later Military Airlift Command), when it became part of Twenty-Third Air Force. It returned to Military Airlift Command control and was transferred to Air Combat Command in 1993.

The fixed-wing and helicopter air crews of the command were credited with 996 combat saves in the Korean War and 2,780 in Southeast Asia during the Vietnam War. The unit's motto was: "That Others May Live."

ARRS returned to its former name of ARS in 1989.

== Origins ==
Presaging the mainstay of the post-World War II USAF rescue structure, the first U.S. Army Air Forces helicopter rescue was performed by Lieutenant Carter Harman in Burma behind Japanese lines on 25–26 April 1944. First Air Commando Sergeant Pilot Ed "Murphy" Hladovcak had crash-landed his L-1 aircraft with three wounded British soldiers on board. Taxing his YR-4 helicopter to its performance limits, Harmon made four flights to the site, making the final hasty liftoff just as shouting soldiers burst from the jungle. He learned later the soldiers were not Japanese, but an Allied land rescue party.

In March 1946, the Air Rescue Service was established under the Air Transport Command to provide rescue coverage for the continental United States. By 1949, ARS aircraft covered all the world's transport routes. The Air Rescue Service emblem was created by Tech Sgt William R. Steffens stationed at Hickam Air Force Base in 1952. The emblem was selected by the government to be used as the official logo for Air Rescue Service until the branch had disestablished and Pararescue was created. The guardian angel and Latin phrase Ut Alique Viva, (trans) That Others May Live, are still used in the current logo for the United States Air Force Pararescue.

== Korea and the Cold War ==
During the Korean War, the mounting use of helicopters on rescue missions helped save more lives. By the time of the Korean Armistice, ARS crews were credited with rescuing 9,898 personnel, including 996 in combat situations.

After the Korean War, the USAF Air Rescue Service resumed worldwide operations for rescue coverage and ARS squadrons flew hundreds of humanitarian relief and rescue missions, primarily using the HU-16 Albatross fixed-wing amphibious aircraft and the UH-19 and HH-19 versions of the H-19 Chickasaw helicopter. In 1954, ARS moved its headquarters to Orlando Air Force Base, Florida. The HU-16, which began Pacific service during the Korean and Vietnam conflicts, was returned to the continental United States in 1968, after 18 years of active use.

In the late 1950s, the USAF bought the H-43 Huskie for use on or near air force bases and air bases, followed by the CH-3E Sea King/HH-3E Jolly Green Giant helicopter and the HC-130 Hercules, a modified version of the C-130 Hercules tactical airlift aircraft, in the mid-1960s.

On 1 January 1966, concurrent with the redesignation of the Military Air Transport Service (MATS) as the Military Airlift Command (MAC), the Air Rescue Service was redesignated as the Aerospace Rescue and Recovery Service (ARRS) to reflect its additional role of worldwide rescue and recovery support for crewed U.S. space flights by the National Aeronautics and Space Administration (NASA).

== Vietnam War ==
The Aerospace Rescue and Recovery Service peacetime force was not equipped, trained, or structured to meet the demands of war in Southeast Asia in the early 1960s. As lessons were learned, the service's rescue capability increased. During the Vietnam War, ARRS crews would save 4,120 people, 2,780 of them in combat situations.

At the outset of the Vietnam War, the USAF's primary rescue helicopter was the HH-43B "Huskie" manufactured by Kaman Aircraft, which had added a firefighting and better crash rescue capability to secure USAF orders. But the HH-43 was slow, short-ranged and unarmed, having been procured primarily for the local base recovery (LBR) mission at air force bases in the United States and overseas. The LBR concept also included a fire suppression role, with an external AFFF foam bottle and firefighters as part of the flight crew.

During June 1961, the HH-43 helicopters, crews, and support personnel of the various major commands were reassigned from their respective home bases and host wings to the Air Rescue Service in an attempt to unify their command structure. Standardized training and mission concepts were also implemented.

As the Vietnam War escalated, HH-43 rescue detachments from bases in the continental United States (CONUS) were deployed to air bases in Vietnam and elsewhere in Southeast Asia (SEA) with the new nickname and callsign of "Pedro." The HH-43B's combat radius of only 75 miles (121 km) was increased with added fuel drums strapped in the cabin. It was eventually replaced with the armored HH-43F model, which had additional internal fuel tanks, for use in Area Crew Recovery (ACR) mission. The HH-43F units were staffed with USAF Pararescue personnel as part of the combat recovery team. Throughout the war, both HH-43B and HH-43F helicopters flew deep into North Vietnam, Laos, and Cambodia. HH-43 crews saved more lives than any other USAF rescue helicopter in the Vietnam War.

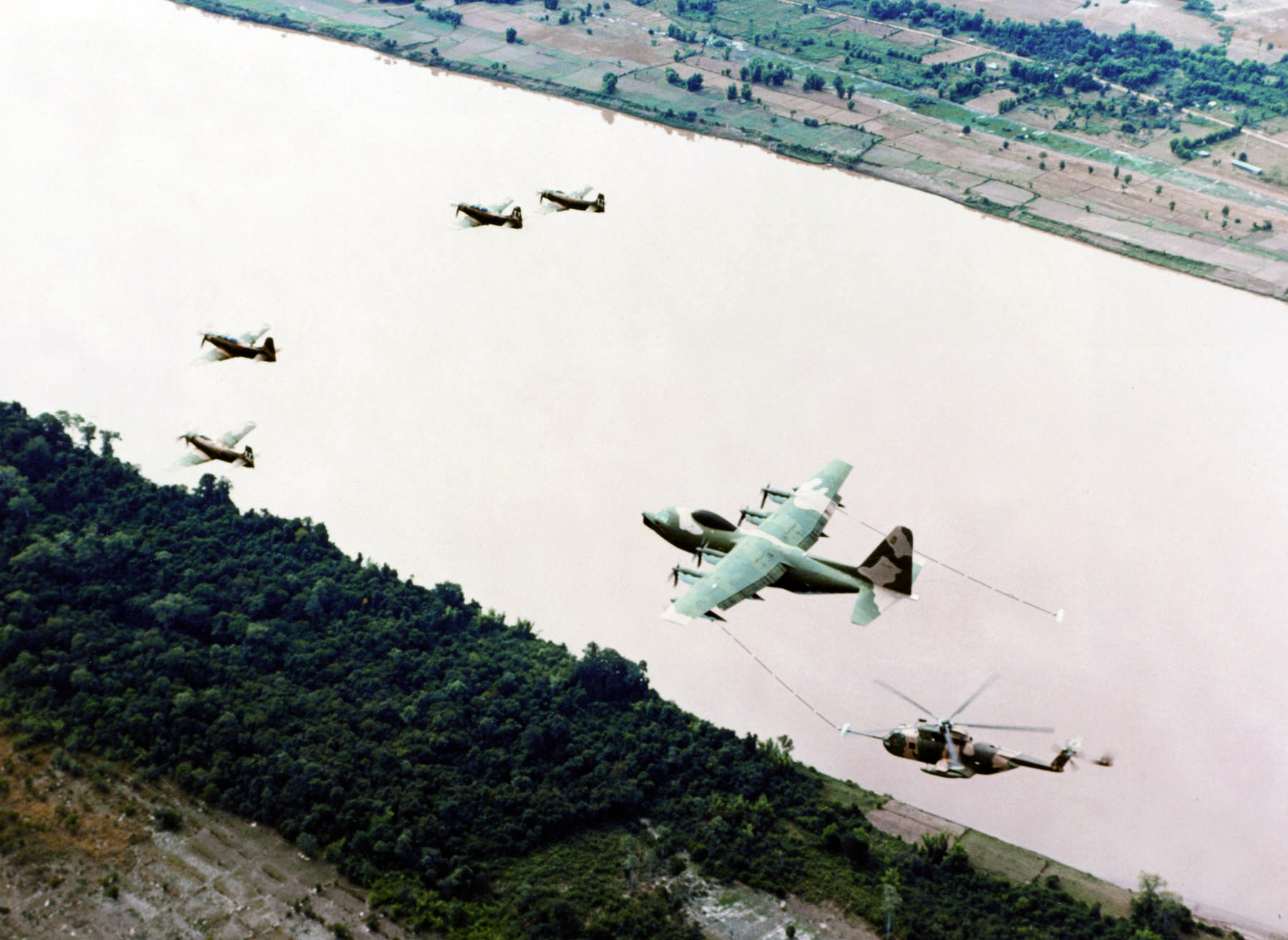
USAF air rescue team

In July 1965, ARS received its first CH-3C, an aircraft considered an adequate aircrew rescue vehicle. Airborne command-and-control of rescue operations was provided in December 1965 with the introduction of the modified Lockheed HC-130H CROWN airborne controller. With the introduction of the HC-130P/N, the air-refuelable HH-3E "Jolly Green Giant" in June 1967, and the delivery of the air-refuelable HH-53B "Super Jolly Green Giant" (the first helicopter specifically designed for combat search and rescue (CSAR) operations) later that year (the latter two aircraft both being dual-engined helicopters), the now-renamed Military Airlift Command (MAC) and ARRS judged that they finally had the right force structure for combat rescue operations in Vietnam.

Other aircraft that were on the rescue mission team included the low and slow-flying Forward Air Controllers (FACs) of the Tactical Air Command (TAC), call sign "Nail," a frequent rescue force component flying the O-1E Bird Dog, and later the O-2A Skymaster.

"Nail" would initially serve as the on-scene commander during a rescue operation until the arrival of Air Force HC-130 Hercules aircraft using the call sign "King," augmented by Douglas A-1 Skyraider aircraft using the call sign "Sandy." The "Nail" aircraft helped locate the downed crew, marking the location with smoke for the "Sandys" and pickup helicopters using the callsigns "Pedro" or "Jolly," and directing close air support (CAS) against enemy ground troops.

In 1968, when Orlando AFB was turned over to the U.S. Navy and redesignated Naval Training Center Orlando, ARRS stateside headquarters moved to Scott AFB, Illinois, and embedded in MAC headquarters.

In 1970, TAC-operated OV-10 Bronco aircraft began working with search and rescue forces, replacing the slower unarmed O-1 Bird Dogs and O-2 Skymasters as FAC aircraft. OV-10s equipped with PAVE NAIL night observation equipment could locate survivors at night or in bad weather and helped develop rescue operations that relied more on advanced technology.

One Department of Defense report said that one Air Force search and rescue crewman and two aircraft were lost for every 9.2 recoveries in Vietnam, while the Navy lost a crewman for every 1.8 recoveries.

ARRS had begun to build its reputation as the world's finest combat rescue force. However, the ARRS continued to be plagued by its own shortsightedness, even as new tactics and doctrine for combined rescue operations were developed. As late as October 1970, Colonel Frederick V. Sohle, commander of the 3d Aerospace Rescue and Recovery Group, would say, "Our development . . . has been a history of relearning lessons already learned by someone else, but who unfortunately could not or did not document it for others to profit by."

This lack of documentation and the inability to integrate an institutional memory among ARRS forces (with the possible exception of the pararescue force) would hamper CSAR units well into the 1980s. Consequently, the CSAR mission became subordinate to daily support and auxiliary mission roles. If one lesson could be drawn from the Vietnam War, it was that an effective CSAR force was needed. Unfortunately, the institutional Air Force failed to learn this lesson well and ARRS assets experienced the same neglect and lack of funding which plagued its ARS predecessor.

== From Vietnam to Desert Storm ==
In addition to overseas taskings, stateside taskings for ARRS also continued. Before 1974, the Air Force had divided the continental United States into three regions, each with a separate Air Force Rescue Coordination Center. In addition to ARRS aircraft, these AFRCCs also coordinated the use of Civil Air Patrol volunteers and their CAP aircraft and ground support units in their role as the civilian USAF Auxiliary, primarily in searches for missing US civilian general aviation aircraft in the United States, leaving stateside ARRS aircraft and units to concentrate on training, stateside military aircraft mishaps, NASA support, or complex SAR or disaster evolutions that were outside the capability of the air and ground assets of local civilian authorities or the CAP.

In May 1974, the Air Force consolidated the three centers into one facility at Scott Air Force Base, Illinois. This single-site Air Force Rescue Coordination Center (AFRCC) allowed co-location with Headquarters, Military Airlift Command; provided better coordination of activities; improved communications and economy of operations; and standardized procedures. The newly formed AFRCC also permitted operations with fewer people while creating a more experienced staff.

The withdrawal of U.S. combat forces from the Vietnam War was reminiscent of the massive drawdown of CSAR assets that occurred following the Korean War. After Vietnam, a few notable rescue operations took place, such as the deployment of ARRS helicopters aboard the USS Saipan (LHA-2) in June and August 1979 in support of a possible emergency evacuation of US personnel in Nicaragua following the Communist Sandinista takeover. However, such missions occurred infrequently.

As 1976 began, the ARRS had its headquarters and staff at Scott AFB, Illinois, and commanded three wings and numerous separate squadrons, detachments, and operating locations. Its subordinate wings were the 39th Aerospace Rescue and Recovery Wing (39 ARRW), the 41st Rescue and Weather Reconnaissance Wing (41 RWRW), and the 1550th Aircrew Training and Test Wing.

Ironically, a classic contingency/rescue operation proved to be the death knell of the ARRS and, even more ironically, no ARRS helicopter units participated in the operation. The aborted mission to rescue the American Embassy hostages in Teheran, Iran in the spring of 1980 dramatically demonstrated the need for close, realistic coordination and planning of joint-service operations. While it is easy to speculate after the fact about what could have been done differently to make the mission successful, there was little doubt that the ARRS MH-53J Pave Low III aircraft was better suited to the operation. However, modified U.S. Navy RH-53D Sea Stallion mine sweeping aircraft with U.S. Marine Corps flight crews were used instead.

In multiple analyses of the aborted rescue attempt, two possible reasons for the use of the RH-53D have been postulated: (1) either the Pave Low system was not yet ready for this type of mission because it had just finished lengthy operational testing or, (2) the RH-53D was used to placate the U.S. Marine Corps so they could participate with an aircraft that more closely approximated their own USMC CH-53D Sea Stallions. Certainly, one must concede that Pave Low aircrews, who were trained in the CSAR arena and routinely relied on HC-130s and MC-130s in their daily operations, were the logical choice for this type of mission and had a better aircraft with which to conduct it. Whatever the case, one point is clear: the entire operation was critically dependent on helicopters. As a result of the botched operation, the U.S. Air Force transferred all ARRS HH-53Es (MH-53E Pave Low III aircraft) to the 1st Special Operations Wing (SOW) and what was then Tactical Air Command control in May 1980. This transfer signaled the end of the ARRS's role in CSAR and precipitated the present distinctions between "rescue drivers" and "special operators."

Thus, the ARRS was left with an aging fleet of UH-1/HH-1 Iroquois or "Huey" (various series), CH-3E and HH-3E Jolly Green Giant aircraft, augmented by HC-130N and HC-130P/N Hercules aircraft converted from C-130E airframes. In effect, the ARRS had no means to accomplish the CSAR mission in the threat environment of the 1980s and 1990s. While the 20-plus-year-old UH-1, with 1960s and 1970s avionics, was no longer useful, the HH-3E continued to provide a measure of effectiveness because of its air-refueling capability and the use of night vision goggles (NVGs). The latter feature allowed aircrews to operate under the cover of darkness, thus decreasing their vulnerability in low-to-medium threat environments.

Although ARRS no longer had the proper mix of aircraft to conduct modern CSAR operations, it continued to train crews in the CSAR environment, with emphasis on NVG operations. However, the inactivation of the HH-1 CSAR units in September 1987 closed a valuable pipeline of CSAR-trained aircrew members and limited the combat rescue role to a total of four overseas HH-3E Jolly Green Giant units and a stateside MH-60G special operations-capable Pave Hawk squadron. Furthermore, developments in the mid-1980s called into questions whether the MH-60G would continue to be affiliated with ARRS or with Military Airlift Command's newly formed 23rd Air Force for special operations following the divestiture of all USAF special operations forces from Tactical Air Command (TAC).

In August 1989, ARRS was reorganized and reestablished as the Air Rescue Service (ARS) at McClellan AFB, California, again as a subcommand to Military Airlift Command (MAC). However, following Operation DESERT STORM in 1991, subsequent major USAF reorganizations resulted in the disestablishment of Military Airlift Command, the divestment of its C-130 tactical/theater airlift assets to U.S. Air Forces in Europe (USAFE), Pacific Air Forces (PACAF) and the newly created Air Combat Command (ACC), and the integration of its C-141 and C-5 strategic airlift assets with the KC-135 and KC-10 air refueling aircraft assets of the former Strategic Air Command (SAC) in order to create the new Air Mobility Command. (Note: ACC C-130 assets would later be transferred back to AMC, while USAFE and PACAF C-130 assets remained under their respective control.)

Meanwhile, MAC's former Twenty-Third Air Force became the nucleus for the new Air Force Special Operations Command (AFSOC). Subsequent Base Realignment and Closure (BRAC) decisions in the 1990s also marked McClellan AFB for closure. Shortly thereafter in 1993, ARS was again disestablished, with most of its CSAR assets transferred to the Air Combat Command (ACC) that had been created by the merger of SAC bomber and strategic reconnaissance forces with the fighter and AWACS assets of the former Tactical Air Command (TAC). Concurrently, a smaller number of forward-based CSAR assets in Europe and the Pacific were transferred to USAFE and PACAF, respectively.

In 1993, concurrent with the disestablishment of MAC and the transfer of peacetime and combat search and rescue responsibilities to ACC, the AFRCC moved from Scott AFB to Langley Air Force Base, Virginia. In October 2003, CSAR was temporarily put under AFSOC, resulting in what was thought would be a merger of Regular Air Force, Air Force Reserve Command, and Air National Guard HC-130P/N assets with MC-130P Combat Shadow assets and integration of HH-60G Pave Hawk assets with MH-53J/M Pave Low IV assets. However, this merger proved to be short-lived and the HC-130P/N and HH-60G CSAR assets were ultimately transferred back to ACC claimancy in 2005.

During the temporary assignment of the CSAR mission to AFSOC, the AFRCC remained at Langley AFB. However, on 1 Mar 2006, after the transfer of CSAR assets back to ACC, the AFRCC was put under 1st Air Force/Air Forces North (AFNORTH), the Air Force component command to the new U.S. Northern Command (USNORTHCOM) and the ACC's Numbered Air Force for the air defense fighter assets of the Air National Guard. As a result, the AFRCC moved to Tyndall AFB, Florida, where it is now consolidated with the 601st Air Operations Center, giving it greater ability to use Air Force air and space capabilities for search and rescue in the continental United States.

The AFNORTH/1AF AOC also gained the responsibility for executing aerial search rescue, and associated personnel recovery operations, for civilian and military aircraft overland in the NORAD-USNORTHCOM area of operations. This resulted in greater efficiencies and capabilities for military personnel and civilians alike.

== Current Rescue & Guardian Angel Unit Designations ==
The current structure and strength of search and rescue in today's U.S. Air Force is focused primarily on combat search and rescue (CSAR) and Personnel Recovery (PR) and is greatly reduced from the force that served from 1946 until the mid-1970s and the Air Force's return from Vietnam.

The bulk of today's USAF air rescue mission continues to come under the Air Combat Command (ACC). Guardian Angel squadrons consisting of pararescuemen, survival specialists, and combat rescue officers execute all five tasks of personnel recovery: report, locate, support, recover and reintegrate. Enlisted Pararescuemen and commissioned Combat Rescue Officers (CROs) in Guardian Angel recovery teams deploy into uncertain or hostile environments independently or in conjunction with helicopters and fixed-wing aircraft, watercraft, and overland vehicles in order to locate, authenticate, and recover isolated personnel for return to friendly lines.

=== Regular Air Force ===
As of 1 October 2011, operational ACC rescue units are as follows:

- 347th Rescue Group, part of the 23d Wing at Moody AFB, Georgia
- 563rd Rescue Group, a geographically separated unit of the 23d Wing located at Davis-Monthan AFB, Arizona

The 347 RQG has one HC-130P/N squadron, the 71st Rescue Squadron (71 RQS), one HH-60G squadron, the 41 RQS, and one Guardian Angel Pararescue squadron, the 38 RQS.

The 563 RQG has one HC-130P/N squadron, the 79 RQS, two HH-60G squadrons, the 55 RQS at Davis-Monthan AFB, Arizona and the 66 RQS at Nellis AFB, Nevada, and two Guardian Angel Pararescue squadrons, the 48 RQS at Davis-Monthan AFB, Arizona and the 58 RQS at Nellis AFB, Nevada.

Air-sea rescue and CSAR assets are also assigned to Pacific Air Forces (PACAF), and United States Air Forces in Europe (USAFE), specifically:

- the 18th Wing's 31st Rescue Squadron (pararescue) and 33rd Rescue Squadron (HH-60G) at Kadena Air Base, Okinawa, Japan for PACAF, and
- the 48th Fighter Wing's 56th Rescue Squadron (HH-60G) & 57th Rescue Squadron (pararescue) at RAF Lakenheath in the United Kingdom for USAFE. This unit was previously based at the former Naval Air Station Keflavik, Iceland.

In this arrangement, the 31 RQS (Pararescue) and 33 RQS (HH-60G) typically provide support throughout the Western Pacific region, while the 56 RQS (HH-60G) & 57th RQS (Pararescue) provide support in Great Britain and Western Europe.

Current CSAR aircraft assets in the Active Air Force include the HH-60G Pave Hawk helicopter, the HC-130P/N Hercules "Combat King" aircraft, and the Fairchild Republic A-10 Thunderbolt II ("Warthog") attack aircraft. In FY 2008, the A-10s of the 23rd Fighter Group previously based at Pope AFB, North Carolina, relocated back to their previous base of Moody AFB, Georgia where they joined their parent 23rd Wing.

In a similar arrangement, the 563 RQG relies on the co-located A-10s of the 355th Fighter Wing at Davis-Monthan AFB, Arizona. Like their A-1 Skyraider and LTV A-7 Corsair II predecessors, the A-10s, designed for close-air support, continue to use the "Sandy" call sign and are woven tightly into CSAR operations. When involved in the CSAR mission, A-10s can neutralize enemy threats to friendly survivors on the ground, engaging hostile forces, with their GAU-8 30 mm Gatling gun, which is unique to the A-10 Thunderbolt II. The GAU-8 allows the A-10 to fire on enemy targets with precision near to friendly forces. A-10s also escort HH-60 helicopters and HC-130s during rescue operations.

Among these various remaining CSAR forces, the 23rd Wing is now considered the principal CSAR organization for the U.S. Air Force. Air Force CSAR personnel continue to use the credo of "These things we do, that others may live."

In addition to ACC A-10 units, other units operating the A-10 in USAFE, PACAF, the Air Force Reserve Command (AFRC) and the Air National Guard (ANG) also routinely exercise and operate with rescue units in the CSAR mission.

=== Air Force Reserve Command ===
Additional CSAR forces also exist in the Air Reserve Component (ARC), composed of both the Air Force Reserve Command (AFRC) and the Air National Guard (ANG).

In the Air Force Reserve Command (AFRC), the ACC-gained 920th Rescue Wing at Patrick Space Force Base, Florida is structured for both CSAR and peacetime SAR, to include principal DoD responsibility for crewed spaceflight rescue support to NASA's John F. Kennedy Space Center, as well as Defense Support to Civil Authorities (DSCA), such as those the wing provided in the wake of Hurricane Katrina in 2005.

The 920 RQW's operational capability is centered on the following units at Patrick Space Force Base:

- 39th Rescue Squadron (HC-130P/N)
- 301st Rescue Squadron (HH-60G), and
- 308th Rescue Squadron (Pararescue/Guardian Angel)

The 920 RQW also contains additional Geographically Separated Units (GSUs) consisting of the:

- 943rd Rescue Group (943 RQG) at Davis-Monthan AFB, Arizona
- 305th Rescue Squadron (HH-60G) at Davis-Monthan AFB
- 306th Rescue Squadron (Pararescue/Guardian Angel) at Davis-Monthan AFB, and
- 304th Rescue Squadron (Pararescue) at Portland International Airport / Portland Air National Guard Base (formerly Portland Air Reserve Station), Oregon. The 304 RQS also flew the HH-60G as a GSU until its inactivation.

=== Air National Guard ===
In the Air National Guard, the ACC-gained New York Air National Guard's 106th Rescue Wing at Francis S. Gabreski Air National Guard Base (former Suffolk County AFB), New York is structured similar to the Air Force Reserve's 920 RQW. The major difference between these two wings is that in the 106 RQW, all operational capability is centered on a single composite-organized rescue squadron, the 102nd Rescue Squadron (102 RQS), merging HC-130P/N, HH-60G and Pararescue assets into a single squadron. The 102 RQS is also the oldest Air National Guard unit in the United States, tracing its roots back to the 1st Aero Squadron which was formed in New York in 1908.

Two additional "hybrid" rescue units are also present in the Air National Guard. The California Air National Guard's 129th Rescue Wing (129 RQW) is based at Moffett Federal Airfield (former Naval Air Station Moffett Field), California with operational capability centered in the 129 RQS (HH-60W), 130 RQS (HC-130J) and 131 RQS (Pararescue).

The Alaska Air National Guard's 176th Wing, a PACAF-gained composite wing formerly located at Kulis Air National Guard Base and now located at Elmendorf AFB, Alaska, also contains both a conventional air-sea rescue and CSAR capability resident in the 210 RQS (HH-60G), 211 RQS (HC-130P/N) and 212 RQS (Pararescue).

== Lineage ==
62nd Air Force Base Unit

- 62nd Army Air Forces Base Unit (Search and Rescue Service) organized on 5 December 1945

Redescribed 62nd Army Air Forces Base Unit (Search and Rescue) on 23 January 1946
Redescribed 62nd Army Air Forces Base Unit (Headquarters, Air Rescue Service) on 23 January 1946
Redescribed 62nd Air Force Base Unit (Headquarters, Air Rescue Service) on 26 September 1947
Discontinued on 3 March 1948 and replaced by Headquarters, Air Rescue Service

USAF Combat Rescue School

- Constituted as Air Rescue Service

Activated on 13 March 1946
Redesignated Aerospace Rescue and Recovery Service on 8 January 1966
Redesignated Air Rescue Service on 1 June 1989
Redesignated USAF Combat Rescue School on 2 July 1993
Inactivated on 15 July 1995

=== Assignments ===
- 62d Army Air Forces Base Unit (Search and Rescue Service) assigned to Headquarters, Army Air Forces, 5 December 1945
- Air Transport Command (later Military Air Transport Command, Military Airlift Command), 13 March 1946
- Twenty-Third Air Force, March 1983
- Military Airlift Command, May 1990
- Air Mobility Command 1 June 1992
- Air Combat Command, February 1993
- 57th Wing, 2 July 1993 – 15 Jul 1995

=== Components ===
Centers

- Aerospace Rescue & Recovery Training Center, 7 February 1969 – 30 June 71
- Air Force Rescue Coordination Center, May 1974 – c. 1 June 1989, unknown – c. 1 March 1993
- Atlantic Air Rescue Center (later Atlantic Aerospace Rescue & Recovery Center, 40th Aerospace Rescue & Recovery Wing), 8 October 1961 – 30 June 1973
- Central Air Rescue Center (later Central Aerospace Rescue & Recovery Center), 16 February 1961 – 1 January 70
- Eastern Air Rescue Center (later Eastern Aerospace Rescue & Recovery Center), 16 February 1961 – 1 January 70
- Pacific Air Rescue Center (later Pacific Aerospace Rescue & Recovery Center, 41st Aerospace Rescue & Recovery Wing, 41st Rescue & Weather Reconnaissance Wing), 8 October 1961 – 1 October 1983
- Western Air Rescue Center (later Western Aerospace Rescue & Recovery Center), 16 February 1961 – 1 January 1970

Wings

- 39 Aerospace Rescue & Recovery Wing, 1 January 1970 – 1 October 1983
- 40th Aerospace Rescue & Recovery Wing (see Atlantic Air Rescue Center)
- 41st Aerospace Rescue & Recovery Wing, 41st Rescue & Weather Reconnaissance Wing (see Pacific Air Rescue Center)

Groups

- 1st Air Rescue Group (see 1st Rescue Squadron)
- 2d Air Rescue Group (see 2d Rescue Squadron)
- 3d Air Rescue Group (see 3d Rescue Squadron)
- 4th Air Rescue Group (see 4th Rescue Squadron)
- 5th Air Rescue Group (see 5th Emergency Rescue Squadron)
- 6th Air Rescue Group (see 6th Rescue Squadron)
- 7th Air Rescue Group (see 7th Rescue Squadron)
- 8th Air Rescue Group, 1 April 1954 – 30 June 58
- 9th Air Rescue Group (see 9th Air Rescue Squadron)
- 10th Air Rescue Group (see 10th Rescue Squadron)
- 11th Air Rescue Group (see 11th Air Rescue Squadron)
- 12th Air Rescue Group (see 12th Air Rescue Squadron)
- 14th Air Rescue Group, 14 May 1953 – 15 December 1957

Squadrons

- Air Rescue Squadron, Provisional, 1, attached 25 January 1963 – 1 November 1963
- 1st Rescue Squadron (later 1st Air Rescue Squadron, 1st Air Rescue Group), 1 September 1949 – 8 December 1956 (attached to Caribbean Air Command after 14 November 1952)
- 2d Rescue Squadron (later 2d Air Rescue Squadron, 2d Air Rescue Group), 1 May 1949 – 24 June 1958 (attached to Thirteenth Air Force November 1952 - November 1955, Pacific Air Forces thereafter)
- 3d Rescue Squadron (later 3d Air Rescue Squadron, 3d Air Rescue Group), 1 May 1949 – 18 June 1957 (attached to Fifth Air Force, 1 May 1949, 314th Air Division, 18 May 1951 Japan Air Defense Force 14 November 1952, Far East Air Forces after 1 August 1954)
- 4th Rescue Squadron (later 4th Air Rescue Squadron, 4th Air Rescue Group), 1 May 1949 – 8 December 1956
- 5th Emergency Rescue Squadron (later 5th Rescue Squadron, 5th Air Rescue Squadron, 5th Air Rescue Group), March 1946 – 8 December 56
- 6th Rescue Squadron (later 6th Air Rescue Squadron, 6th Air Rescue Group), c. 1 September 1949 – 18 February 1958
- 7th Rescue Squadron (later 7th Air Rescue Squadron, 7th Air Rescue Group), 1 September 49 – 8 December 1956
- 9th Air Rescue Sq (later 9th Air Rescue Group), 10 August 1950 – 24 June 1958
- 10th Rescue Sq (later 10th Air Rescue Squadron, 10th Air Rescue Group), c. 1 January 1950 – 8 January 1958
- 11th Air Rescue Squadron (later 11th Air Rescue Group), 12 February 1951 – 16 February 1954
- 12th Air Rescue Sq (later 12th Air Rescue Group), 1 March 1952 – 18 February 1958
- 31st Air Rescue Squadron (later 31st Aerospace Rescue & Recovery Squadron), 24 June 1958 – 18 September 1960, 8 July 1963 – April 1967 (attached to Pacific Air Rescue Center (later Pacific Aerospace Rescue & Recovery Center after 8 July 1963))
- 33d Air Rescue Squadron (later 33d Air Recovery Squadron, 33d Aerospace Rescue & Recovery Squadron), 24 June 1958 – 18 March 1960 (attached to Pacific Air Forces until 17 Mar 1959, then to Detachment 2, Air Rescue Service (Pacific Recovery Operations Center)), 18 June 1961 – 1 April 1967 (attached to Detachment 1, Air Rescue Service (Pacific Recovery Operations Center) until 8 October 1961, then to Pacific Air Rescue Center (later Pacific Aerospace Rescue and Recovery Center).
- 36th Air Rescue Squadron (later 36th Air Recovery Squadron, 36th Aerospace Rescue & Recovery Squadron), 24 June 1958 – 18 March 1960 (attached to Fifth Air Force), 18 June 1961 – 1 April 1967 (attached to Fifth Air Force)
- 38th Air Rescue Squadron, 1 July 1965 – 8 January 1966 (attached to 2d Air Division)
- 39th Air Rescue Squadron, 1 January 1992 – 1 February 1993
- 41st Air Rescue Squadron (later 41st Aerospace Rescue & Recovery Squadron), 8 December 1956 – 18 March 1960, 8 January 1962 – 1 January 1970
- 46th Air Rescue Squadron, 8 December 1956 – 18 March 1960
- 48th Air Rescue Squadron (later 48th Air Recovery Squadron, 48th Aerospace Rescue & Recovery Squadron), 8 December 1956 – 7 February 1969
- 53d Air Rescue Squadron, 18 February 1958 – 18 April 1960
- 54th Air Rescue Squadron (later 54th Air Recovery Squadron, 54th Aerospace Rescue & Recovery Squadron), 18 February 1958 – 18 June 1960, 18 June 1961 – 1 January 1970
- 55th Air Rescue Squadron (later 55th Aerospace Rescue & Recovery Squadron), 18 February 1958 – 18 June 1960, 18 June 1961 – 1 January 1970
- 56th Air Rescue Squadron, 18 February 1958 – 18 March 1960 (attached to Detachment 3, 8 Air Rescue Group 18 February 1958, Detachment 3, Air Rescue Service after 18 March 1959)
- 57th Air Rescue Squadron (later 57th Air Recovery Squadron), 24 June 1958 – 8 January 1966
- 58th Air Rescue Squadron (later 58th Aerospace Rescue & Recovery Squadron), 8 December 1956 – 18 September 1960 (attached to United States Air Forces in Europe), 18 June 1961 – 1 April 1967
- 64th Air Rescue Squadron, 20 June 1958 – 18 June 1960
- 66th Air Rescue Squadron, 1 March 1991 – 1 February 1993 (attached to 4404th Operations Group (Provisional) after 25 January 1993)
- 67th Air Rescue Squadron (later 67th Air Recovery Squadron, 67th Aerospace Rescue & Recovery Squadron), 24 June 1958 – 18 March 60, 18 June 1961 – 8 April 1967
- 71st Air Rescue Squadron, 21 October 1957 – 18 March 1960, 1 August 1989 – 30 June 1991, 1 October 1991 – 1 February 1993
- 76th Air Rescue Squadron (later 76th Aerospace Rescue & Recovery Squadron), 24 June 1958 – 1975 (attached to 326th Air Division until May 1959, 6486th Air Base Wing until 1975)
- 79th Air Rescue Squadron (later 79th Aerospace Rescue & Recovery Squadron), 24 June 1958 – 18 September 1960, 18 June 1961 – c.1 April 1967
- 2156th Air Rescue Squadron (see 2156th Air Rescue Unit)
- 2157th Air Rescue Squadron, 1 March 1952 – 8 April 1956
- 2157th Air Rescue Squadron, (Note: Although they had the same designation, the two 2157th Air Rescue Squadrons are not related.) 1 February 1958 – 18 March 1959

Flights

- 1060th Air Rescue Flt (later 2153d Rescue Unit), 1 June 1948 – 1 September 49
- 1061st Air Rescue Flt (later 2154th Rescue Unit), 1 June 1948 – 1 September 49

Units

- 8th Rescue Unit, 1 March 1948 – 28 August 1948
- 9th Rescue Unit, 1 March 1948 – 28 August 1948
- 511th Air Force Base Unit (Air Rescue Flight), 16 May 1948 – 3 June 1948
- 512th Air Force Base Unit (Air Rescue Flight), 1 May 1948 – 3 June 1948
- 1050th Air Rescue Unit (later 2152d Rescue Unit), 1 June 1948 – c. 1 September 1949
- 2150th Rescue Unit, 26 August 1948 – 1 September 1949
- 2151st Rescue Unit, 26 August 1948 – 1 September 1949
- 2152d Rescue Unit (see 1050th Air Rescue Unit)
- 2153d Rescue Unit (see 1060th Air Rescue Flight)
- 2154th Rescue Unit (see 1061st Air Rescue Flight)
- 2155th Rescue Unit, 1 July 1949 – 1 September 1949
- 2156th Air Rescue Unit (Transition Training Unit) (later 2156th Air Rescue Squadron (Transition Training Unit)), 1 January 1950 – 24 Oct 51

=== Stations ===
- Andrews Field, Maryland, 5 December 1945/13 March 1946
- Gravelly Point Virginia, June 1946
- Morrison Field, Florida, July 1946
- MacDill Field, Florida, July 1947
- Orlando Air Force Base, Florida, December 1947
- Scott Air Force Base, Illinois, July 1968
- McClellan Air Force Base, California 1 June 1989
- Nellis Air Force Base, Nevada, 1 July 1993 – 15 July 1995
