= 48th Rescue Squadron =

US Air Force unit

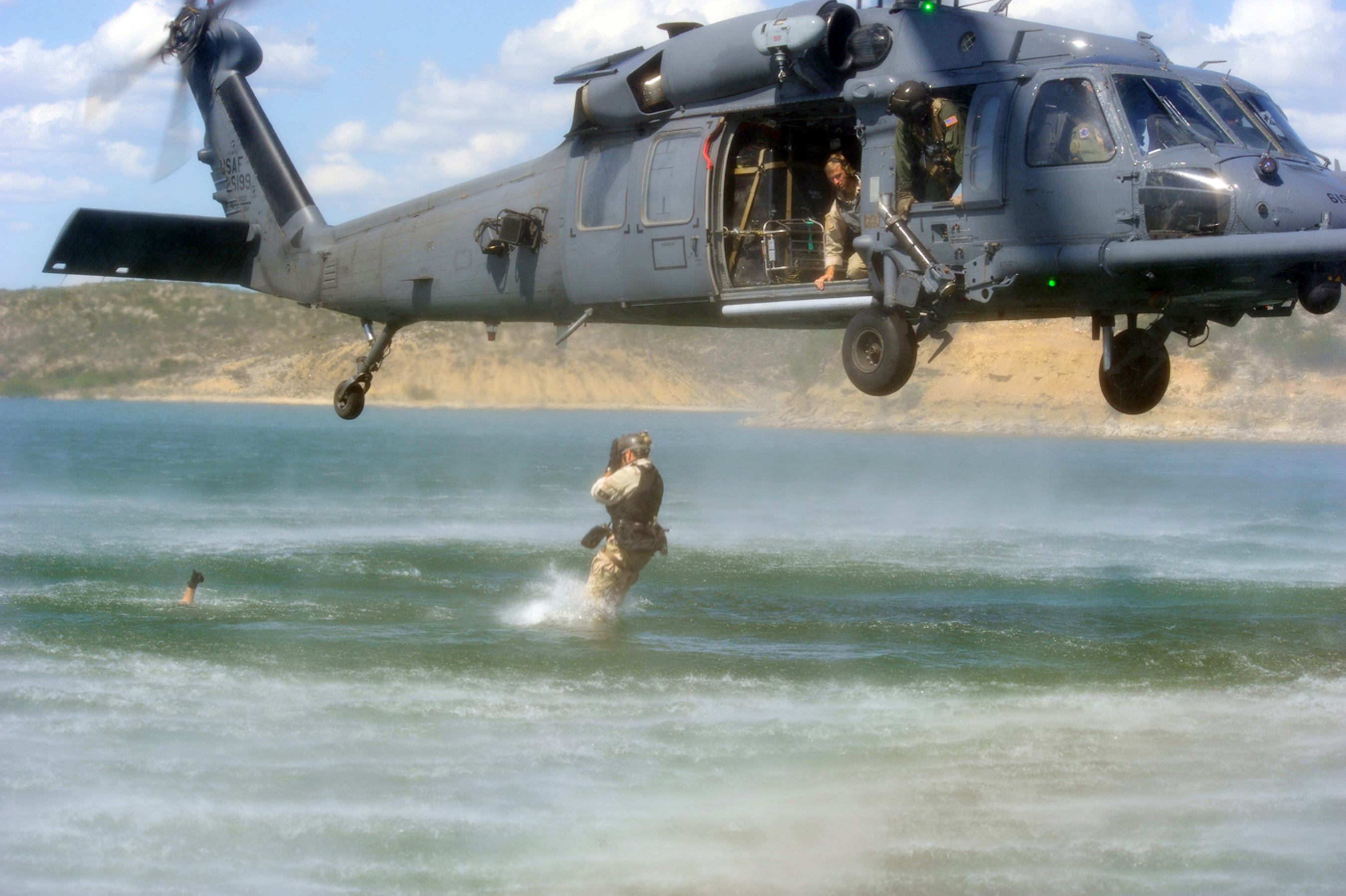
- Members of the 48th Rescue Squadron training in preparation for the upcoming hurricane season
- Active: 1952–1969; 1972–1976; 1985–1987; 1993–present
- Country: United States
- Branch: United States Air Force
- Role: Search and Rescue
- Part of: Air Combat Command
- Garrison/HQ: Davis–Monthan Air Force Base
- Mottos: Valor and Honor, Night Riders (1994– )
- Decorations: Air Force Outstanding Unit Award

Insignia
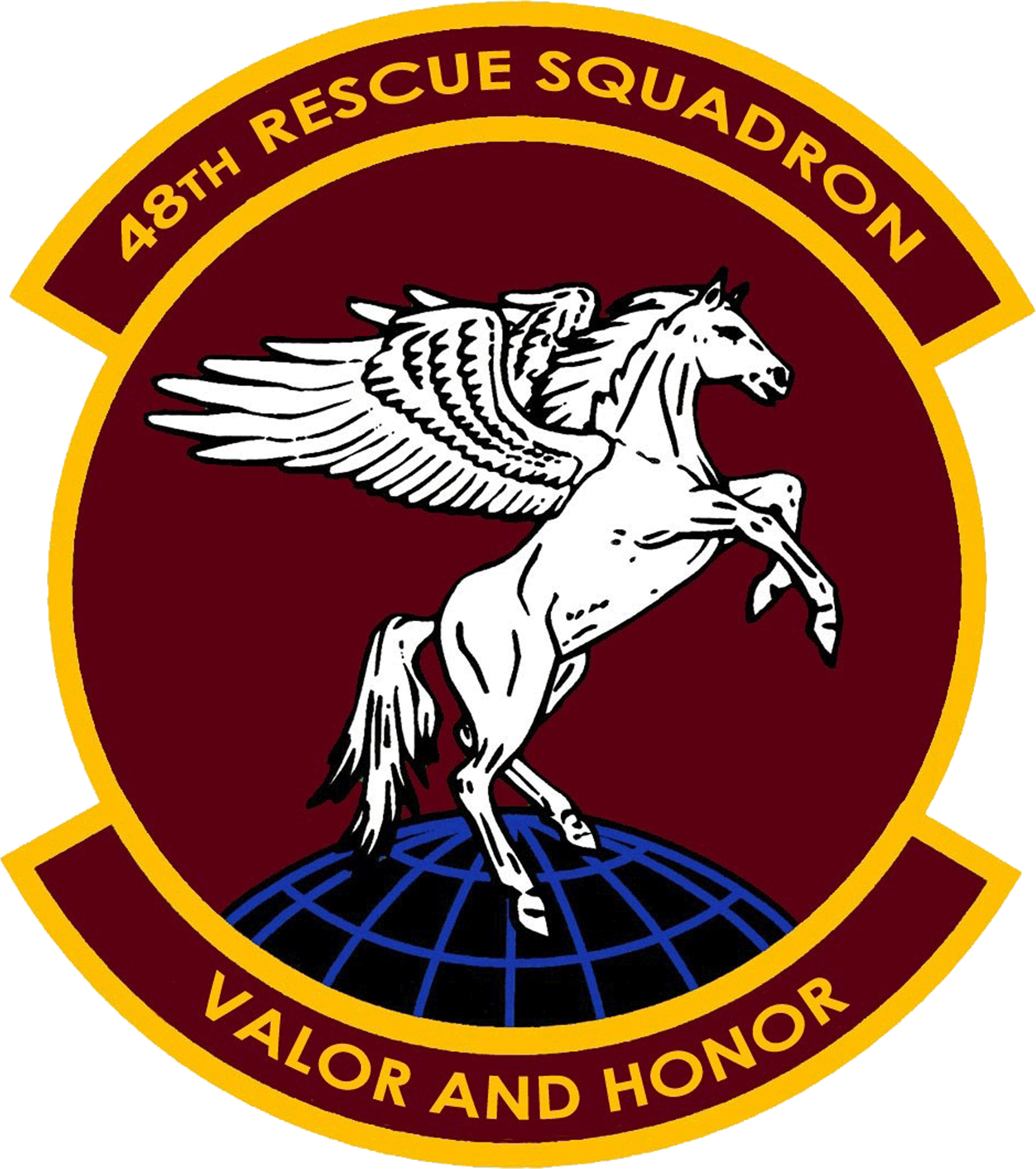
- 48th Rescue Squadron emblem

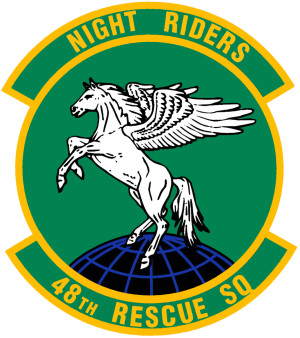
- 48th Air Rescue Squadron emblem (approved 19 May 1994)

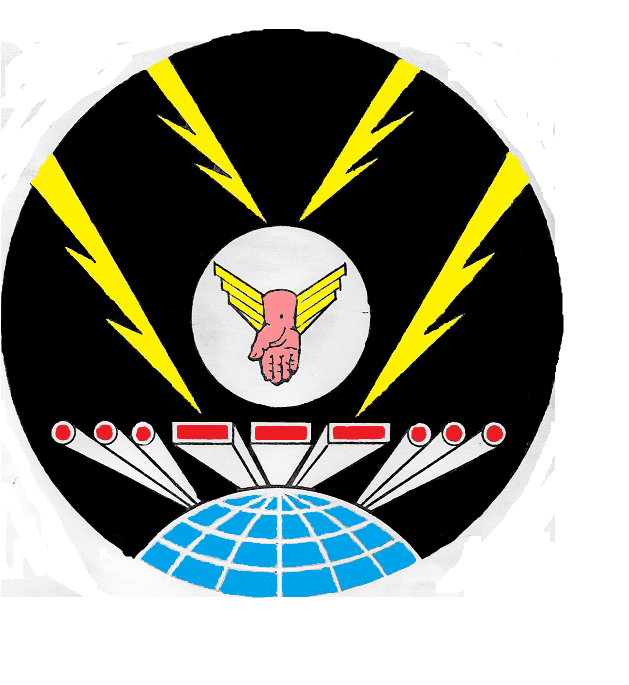
- 48th Air Rescue Squadron emblem (approved 1 December 1953)

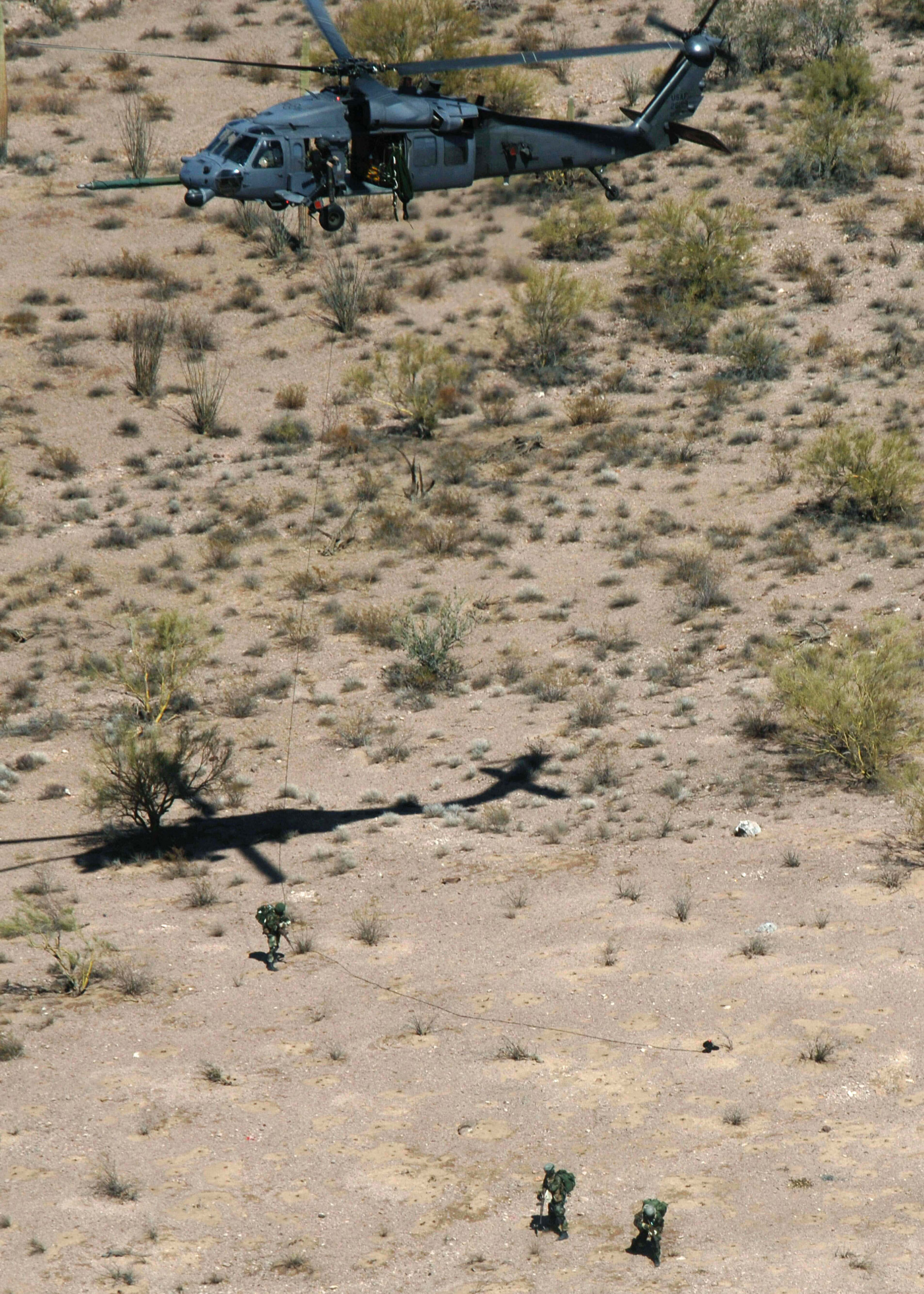
Squadron personnel practice landing in a 'hot' Landing Zone

The 48th Rescue Squadron is part of the 563rd Rescue Group at Davis–Monthan Air Force Base, Arizona. PJs/CROs fly on HH-60 Pave Hawk and HC-130 aircraft to conduct combat rescue and search and rescue missions.

== Mission ==
The 48th Rescue Squadron trains, equips, and employs combat-ready pararescuemen, combat rescue officers, and supporting personnel worldwide in support of U.S. national security interests. It provides survivor contact, treatment, and extraction during combat rescue operations, uses various fixed and rotary wing insertion and extraction assets. It employs by any means available to provide combat and humanitarian search, rescue, and medical assistance in all environments.

== History ==
=== Activation and training mission ===
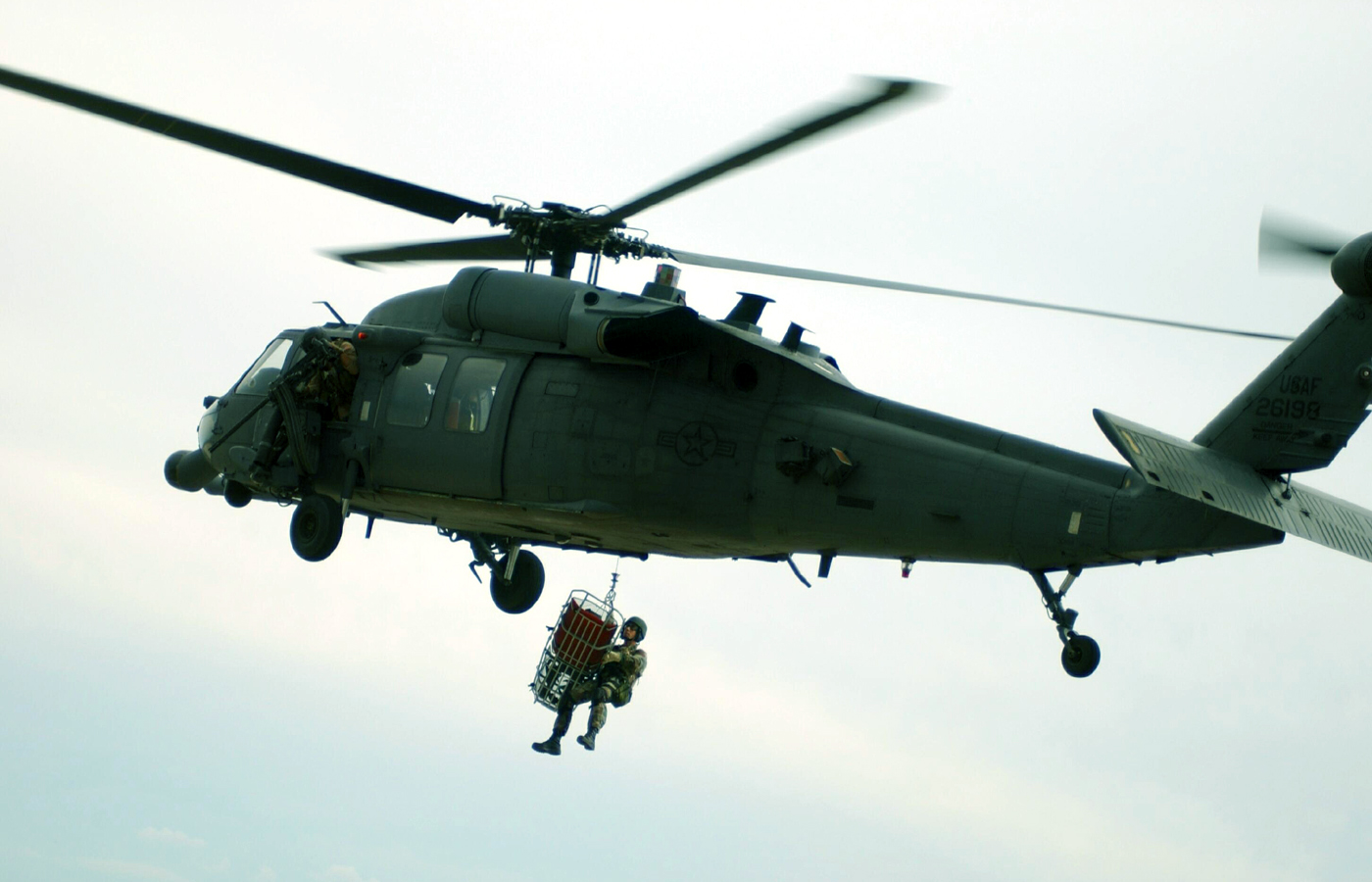
48 RQS Pararescueman loads a simulated patient during an exercise

The squadron was first activated as the 48th Air Rescue Squadron in November 1952, when Air Rescue Service expanded its existing rescue squadrons into groups. The 48th was established with the assets of Flight C of the 5th Air Rescue Squadron at Maxwell Air Force Base, Alabama. In January 1955, the squadron moved to Eglin Air Force Base, Florida. At Maxwell and Eglin, the 48th flew search, rescue and recovery missions, mostly over water. At Eglin, the squadron added the mission of training rescue aircrews. The squadron was inactivated in February 1969 and ite mission transferred to the Aerospace Rescue and Recovery Training Center.

=== Survival School support ===
The squadron, now the 48th Aerospace Rescue and Recovery Squadron was reactivated at Fairchild Air Force Base, Washington in September 1972. It supported the 3636th Combat Crew Training Wing, which conducted the Air Force's advanced survival school at Fairchild, while continuing to fly search and rescue (SAR) missions. The squadron was inactivated at Fairchild in August 1976.

The squadron was again activated to support survival training in October 1985 at Homestead Air Force Base, Florida, where the USAF Water Survival School, run by a squadron of the 3636th Wing, was located. Again it flew SAR missions in addition to its training role. In addition, squadron personnel performed interdiction missions in support of the South Florida Drug Interdiction Task Force while at Homestead. In December 1987, the squadron was again inactivated.

=== Rescue in the southwest ===
The 48th was reactivated at Holloman Air Force Base, New Mexico in 1993 and for the next six years flew combat search and rescue missions. Its most recent activation at Davis–Monthan Air Force Base, Arizona in 2004 was as a "guardian angel" squadron, providing pararescuemen, flying on the aircraft and helicopters of the other squadrons of the 563d Rescue Group.

== Lineage ==
- Constituted as the 48th Air Rescue Squadron on 17 October 1952

Activated on 14 November 1952
Redesignated 48th Air Recovery Squadron on 1 February 1965
Redesignated 48th Aerospace Rescue and Recovery Squadron on 8 January 1966
Redesignated 48th Aerospace Rescue and Recovery Squadron, Training on 8 July 1967
Inactivated on 7 February 1969

- Redesignated 48th Aerospace Rescue and Recovery Squadron on 14 September 1972

Activated on 15 September 1972
Inactivated on 1 August 1976

- Activated on 1 October 1985

Inactivated on 31 December 1987

- Redesignated 48th Rescue Squadron on 1 April 1993

Activated on 1 May 1993
Inactivated on 1 February 1999

- Activated on 1 April 2004

=== Assignments ===
- 5th Air Rescue Group, 14 November 1952
- Air Rescue Service (later Aerospace Rescue and Recovery Service), 8 December 1956 – 7 February 1969
- 39th Aerospace Rescue and Recovery Wing, 15 September 1972
- 41st Rescue and Weather Reconnaissance Wing, 1 January–1 August 1976
- 39th Aerospace Rescue and Recovery Wing, 1 October 1985 – 31 December 1987
- 49th Fighter Wing, 1 May 1993 – 1 February 1999
- 563d Rescue Group, 1 April 2004 – present

=== Stations ===
- Maxwell Air Force Base, Alabama, 14 November 1952
- Eglin Air Force Base, Florida, 10 January 1955 – 7 February 1969
- Fairchild Air Force Base, Washington, 15 September 1972 – 1 August 1976
- Homestead Air Force Base, Florida, 1 October 1985 – 31 December 1987
- Holloman Air Force Base, New Mexico, 1 May 1993 – 1 February 1999
- Davis–Monthan Air Force Base, Arizona, 1 April 2004 – present

=== Aircraft ===
- Boeing SB-29 Super Dumbo (1952–1954)
- Fairchild C-82 Packet (1952–1953)
- Grumman HU-16 Albatross (1954–1968)
- Sikorsky SH-19 (later HH-19) (1954–1963)
- Douglas C-54 Skymaster (1956–1965)
- Douglas C-54 SC-54 (later HC-54) Rescuemaster (1956–1965)
- Kaman HH-43 Huskie (1963–1965, 1966–1968)
- Lockheed HC-130 Hercules (1965–1969)
- Sikorsky HH-3 Jolly Green Giant (1966–1969)
- Sikorsky CH-3 (1966–1969)
- Sikorsky HH-53 Super Jolly Green Giant (1966–1969)
- Bell UH-1 Huey (1972–1976, 1985–1987)
- Sikorsky HH-60 Pave Hawk (1993 – present)
- Lockheed Martin HC-130J Combat King II (2011 - present)
- Sikorsky HH-60 Jolly Green II (2022 - present)

== See also ==
- List of United States Air Force rescue squadrons
